= Elshitsa =

Elshitsa Елшица
- Village
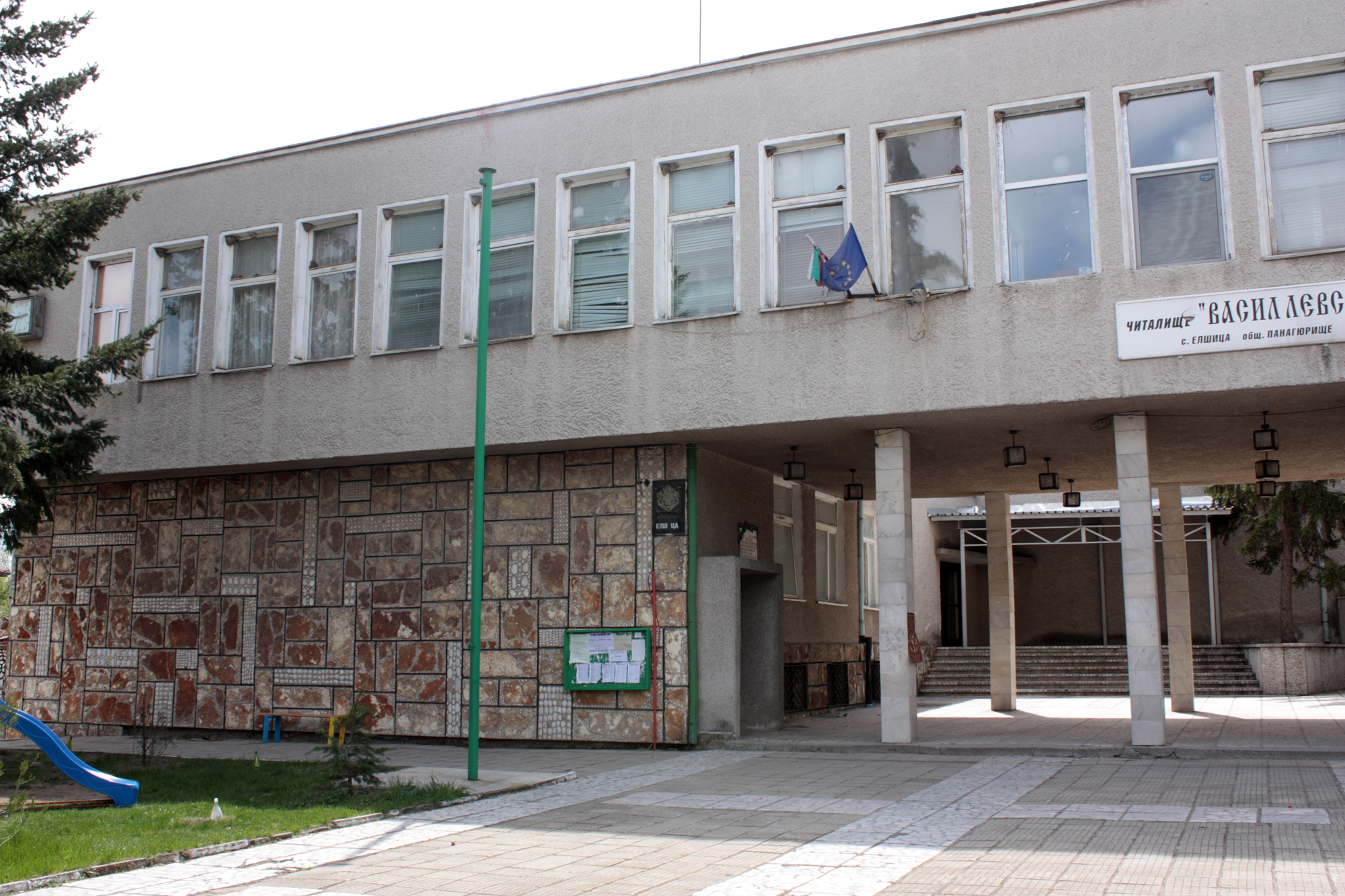
- Elshitsa Town Hall Building

- Location in Bulgaria
- Coordinates: 42°22′0″N 24°13′0″E
- Country: Bulgaria
- Province: Pazardzhik
- Municipality: Panagyurishte

Government
  - Mayor: Mitko Kochev (GERB)

Area
  - Total: 53,721 km^{2} (20,742 sq mi)
- Elevation: 452 m (1,483 ft)

Population (2024)
  - Total: 532
- Postal code: 4538
- Area code: 03538
- Vehicle registration: РА

Elshitsa (Bulgarian: Елшица) is a village in the Panagyurishte municipality, western Bulgaria, with 574 inhabitants as of 2024.

== Geography ==
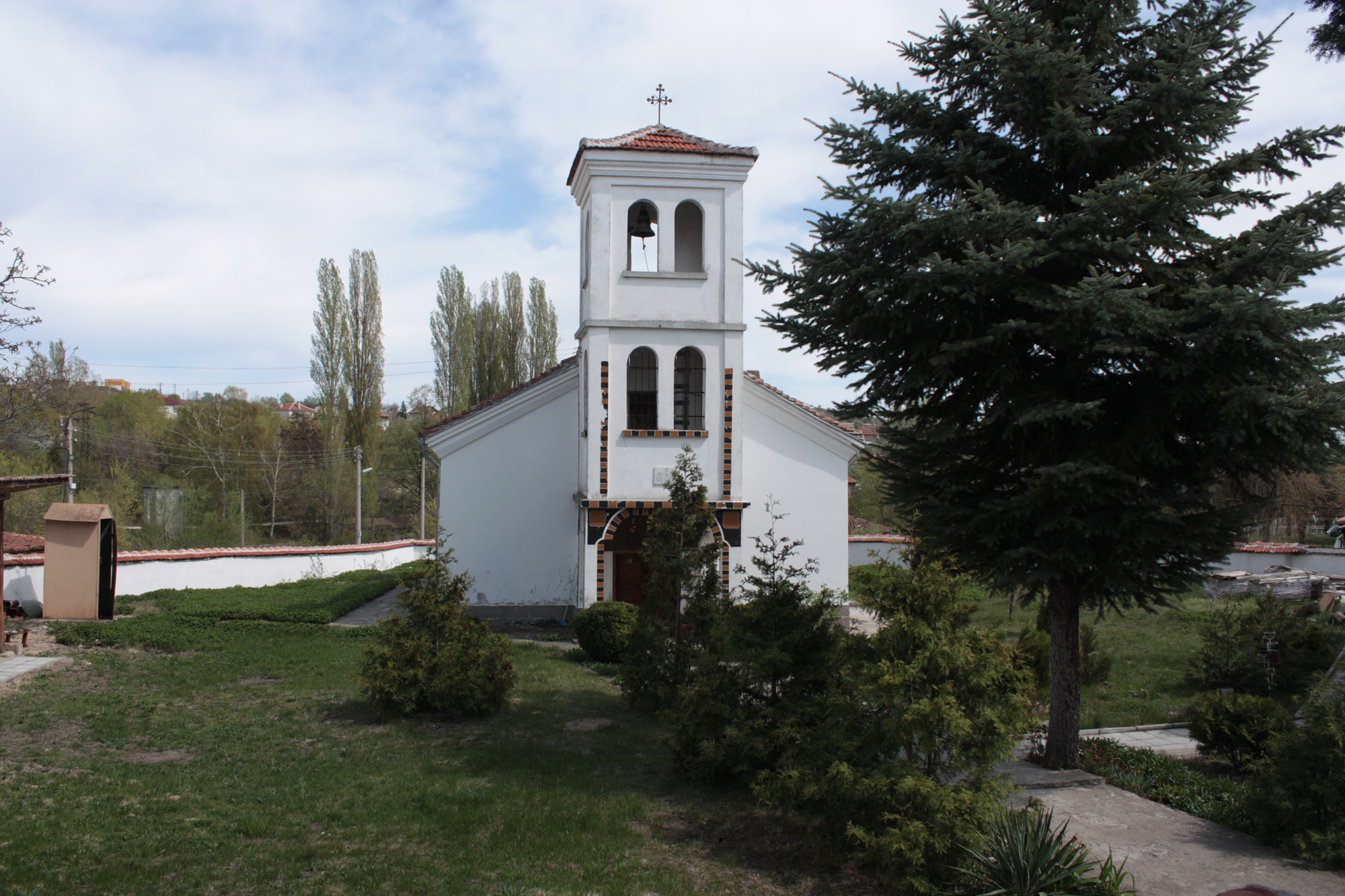
A church in Elshitsa

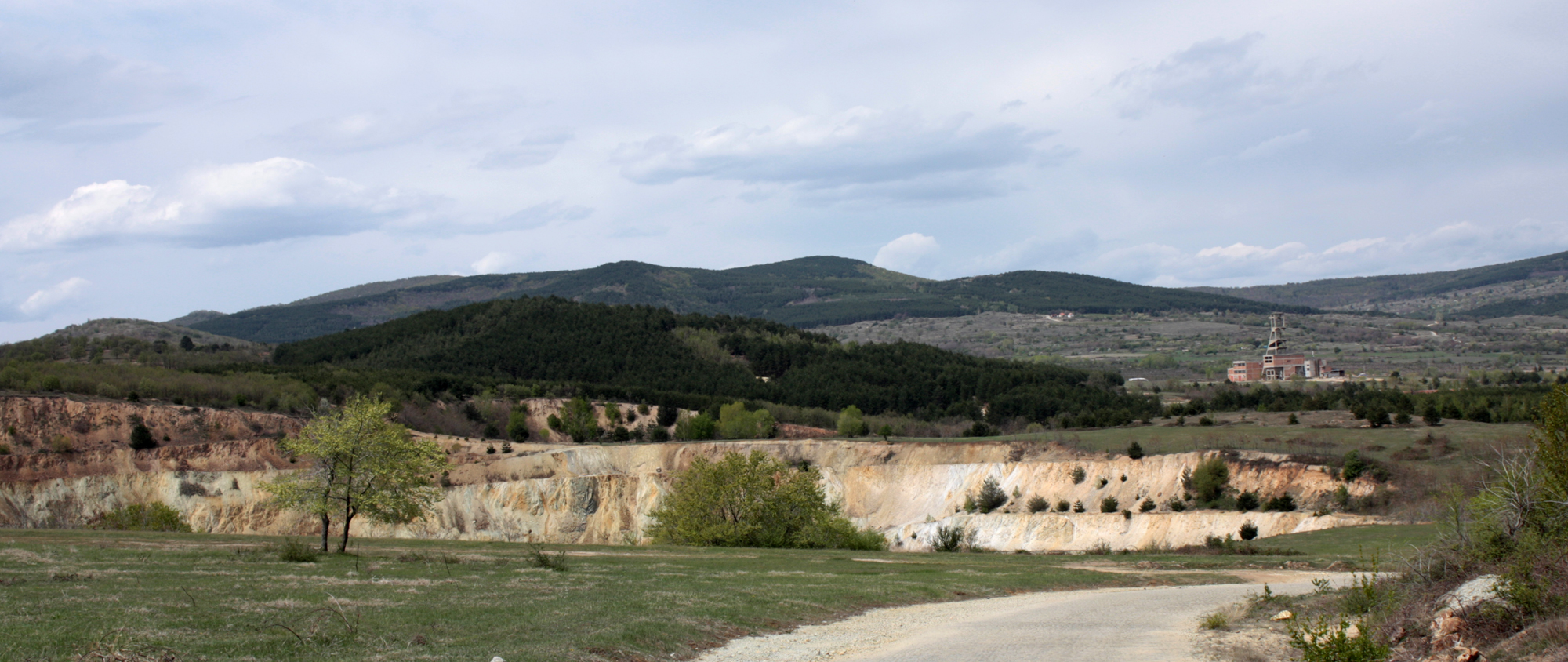
The former copper mine

The village is situated in a hilly region at an altitude of 400–450 m, lying in the southern foothills of the central part of the Sredna Gora mountain range as it descends to the Upper Thracian Plain. It is located between the drainage basins of the rivers Luda Yana and Topolnitsa, both left tributaries of the Maritsa. The village falls within the temperate continental climatic zone. The soils are mainly cinnamon forest.

Administratively, Elshitsa is part of Panagyurishte Municipality, located in the northwestern part of Pazardzhik Province. It has a territory of 53.721 km^{2}. It is situated almost half-way between the municipal seat Panagyurishte and the provincial center, the city of Pazardzhik. The closest settlements are the villages of Popintsi to the northeast, Levski to the east, Kalugerovo to the southeast, and Lesichovo to the west. It is served by a municipal road that branches off the second class II-37 road between Panagyuriste and Pazardzhik.

== History and culture ==
The area of Elshitsa has been inhabited since antiquity. The village was mentioned in Ottoman registers of 1586. It participated in the anti-Ottoman April Uprising of 1876 and in the aftermath of its suppression was burnt down by the Ottoman bashi-bazouk. In 1923 it participated in the Communist insurrection, known as the September Uprising.

The village has a school since 1864, a kindergarten, a medical center, a sports hall and a church. The local cultural center, known in Bulgarian as a chitalishte, was established in 1925 was named after the Bulgarian revolutionary and national hero Vasil Levski. There is a monument to the fallen for the national unification in the Balkan Wars and the First World War.

== Economy ==
The region has seen substantial mining, including the Elshitsa epithermal deposit, a large open-pit copper mine active between 1928 and 1999. After the mining activity has been discontinued, the backbone of the economy has returned to agriculture. Crops include cereals, grapes, tobacco. Livestock breeding is also developed, mainly sheep. There is a deer breeding reserve some 4 km northwest of the village.
