= Assarel mine =

Copper mine in Sofia, Bulgaria

- Location of Assarel mine, Bulgaria

Location
- Location: Panagyurishte, Pazardzhik Province, Bulgaria; 42°32′31″N 24°9′6″E

Production
- Products: Copper

History
- Opened: 1976

The Assarel mine (Bulgarian: мина Асарел), sometimes transliterated as Asarel, is a large copper mine located in the Sredna Gora mountain range of western Bulgaria in Pazardzhik Province near the town of Panagyurishte. Assarel represents one of the largest copper reserves in Bulgaria as well as in the world, given its estimated reserves of 318 million tonnes of ore containing about 0.36% copper. It is operated by the Asarel Medet company, one of the most important enterprises in Pazardzhik Province.
