= Opticoelectron =

Coordinates: 42°30′30″N 24°9′1″E

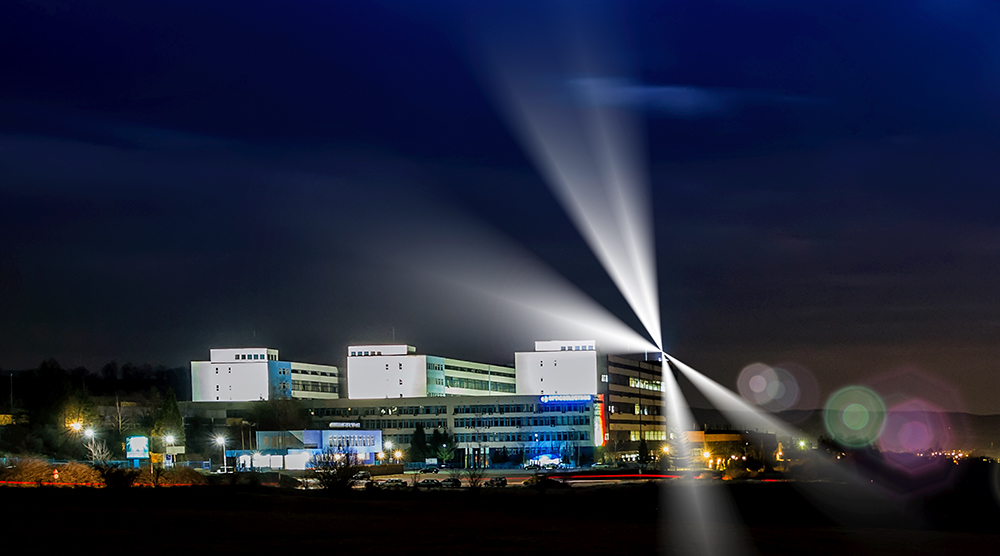
- Traded as: joint-stock company
- Industry: Optics and optoelectronics
- Founded: 1971
- Headquarters: Panagyurishte, Bulgaria
- Area served: Worldwide
- Products: Optomechanical, optoelectronic and laser devices for defense and security, medicine, machines
- Number of employees: 650 (2024)
- Website: Opticoel.com

Opticoelectron (Bulgarian: Оптикоелектрон) is a Bulgarian manufacturer of optics and optoelectronics based in the town of Panagyurishte in the Pazardzhik Province, Bulgaria. Along with Optix headquartered in the same town, the company is the main producer of optical equipment for the defense industry of Bulgaria.

== History ==
Opticoelectron was established in Panagyurishte in January 1971 with the inauguration of a workshop producing lenses. In June 1971 a decision of the Council of Ministers of Bulgaria formally established the state enterprise United Factories Opticoelectron dedicated to the production of opticomechanics and opticoelectronics, that encompassed several factories in Panagyurishte, Sofia and Samokov. The construction of the current premises of the factory began in September 1971 in the western outskirts of Panagyurishte. In the same year in the nearby town of Strelcha was inaugurated the first subsidiary branch of Opticoelectron, the Workshop for Custom Equipment.

Throughout the 1970s the factory diversified its products that also included machines for processing optical equipment and started mass production of indigenously developed equipment. By 1982 the United Factories Opticoelectron included 18 production facilities in southwestern half Bulgaria and the factories in Plovdiv, Pazardzhik and Velingrad were restructured in their own enterprises. The plants that remained affiliated with the main factory in Panagyurishte were several workshops in Strelcha, Lesichovo, Karabunar, Dospat and Ihtiman. The 1980s were a period of continuous expansion, with growing range of military and civilian products, increasing quality and revenue. A significant part of output was exported for the military of the Soviet Union and the countries of the Warsaw Pact. In that period Opticoelectron employed 5,000 workers in Panagyurishte alone, and 12,000 in total throughout Bulgaria.

The factory had an important role in the social life of Panagyurishte Municipality since the very start of its operation. It maintained numerous clubs that participated in local and national cultural, scientific and sports activities. There were recreational areas in the resort of Panagyurski kolonii. It was also crucial for the establishment of the Professional High School in the town.

The profound economic changes following the transition to a market economy after the Bulgarian Communist Party gave up power in 1989 had a significant impact on Opticoelectron. In 1992 the factory was included in the list of state enterprises for future liquidation. However, despite the difficulties and the reduction of the personnel, production never seized. In 1999 Opticoelectron was privatized and eventually paid back all previous debts. The company successfully found new markets, mainly in the European Union and NATO, entering a period of expansion.

== Production and facilities ==
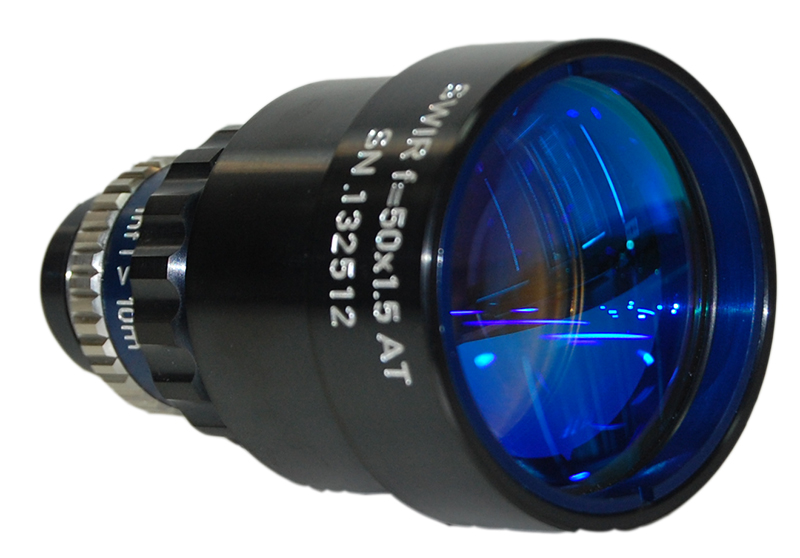
SWIR lens produced by Opticoelectron

The premises of the company in the western outskirts of Panagyurishte cover an area of 260,000 m^{2}, of which 108,000 m^{2} are dedicated to production. Opticoelectron employs 650 workers, of them 150 are engineers, specialized in designing own products and products on demand. It is the largest producer of optical and opticoelectronic equipment and components in the Balkan Peninsula. Opticoelectron has a closed cycle of production from design to manufacturing and marketing. Over 97% of the production is exported to EU countries, North America and the Middle East.

The company produces a wide arrange of military equipment, such as anti-aircraft and ground artillery sights for firing in daytime and in nighttime; day, night and thermal optical sights; SWIR lenses; laser rangefinders; laser target designators; surveillance systems; optical systems for armored vehicles; video observation, etc. Civilian production includes spherical lenses, ocular lenses, micro optics, flat optics, IR optics, glass molding, optical coatings, achromatic doublets and triples, optical assemblies, optical reticles, radii test plates, etc.

Opticoelectron directs investments for research, new technologies, machines and efficiency. As part of the national and EU efforts to reduce emissions, in 2023 it commissioned a 5 MW solar power plant within the company's premises.
