= Bata, Pazardzhik Province =

Bata Бъта
- Village
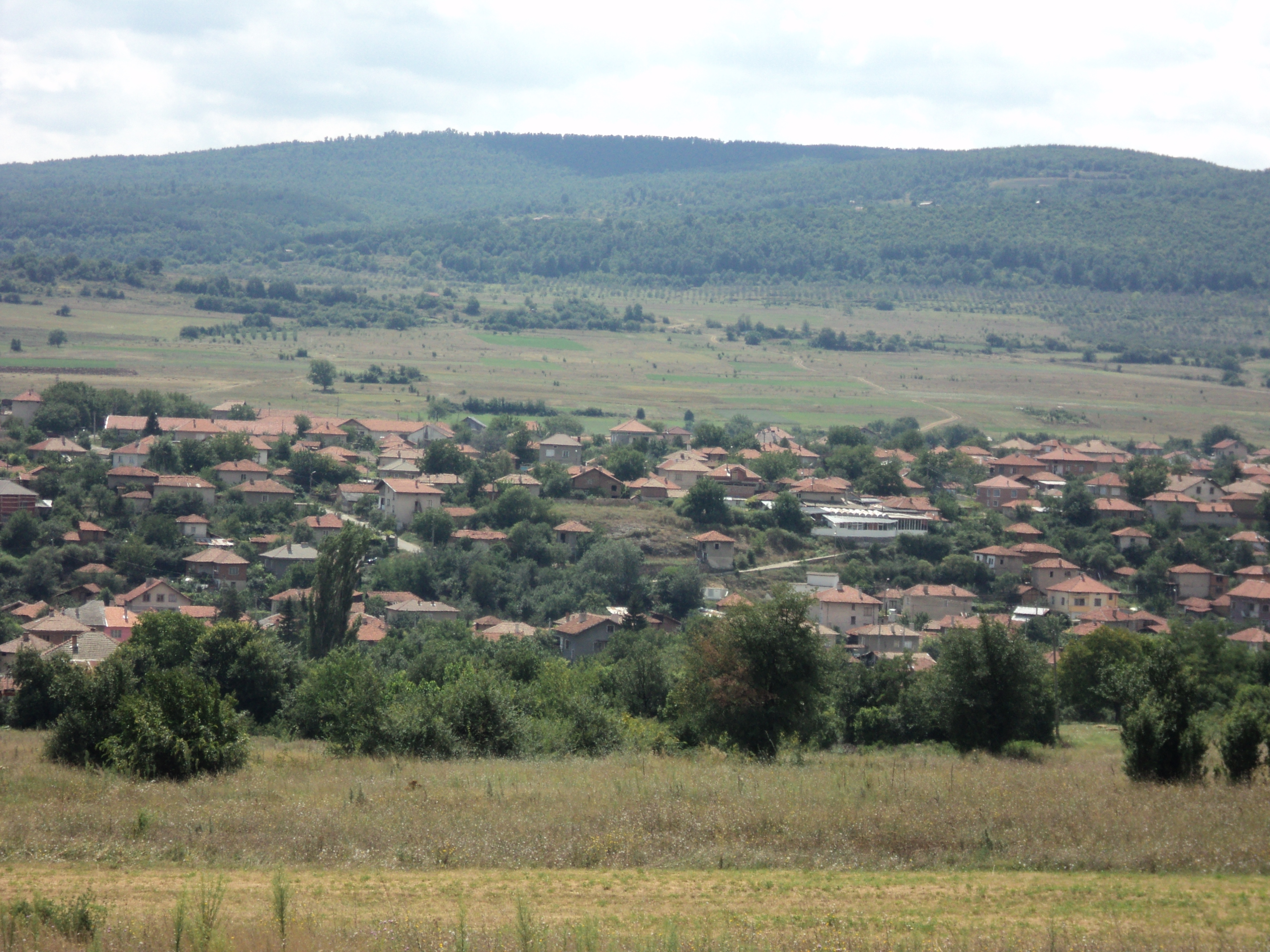

- Location of Bata
- Coordinates: 42°27′N 24°11′E
- Country: Bulgaria
- Provinces (Oblast): Pazardzhik Province

Government
  - Mayor: Georgi Aleksandrov (Ind.)

Area
  - Total: 47.704 km^{2} (18.419 sq mi)
- Elevation: 431 m (1,414 ft)

Population (2024)
  - Total: 943
  - Density: 19.8/km^{2} (51.2/sq mi)
- Time zone: UTC+2 (EET)
  - Summer (DST): UTC+3 (EEST)
- Postal Code: 4527

Bata (Bulgarian: Бъта) is a village in Pazardzhik Province of western Bulgaria with 943 inhabitants as of 2024.

== Geography ==
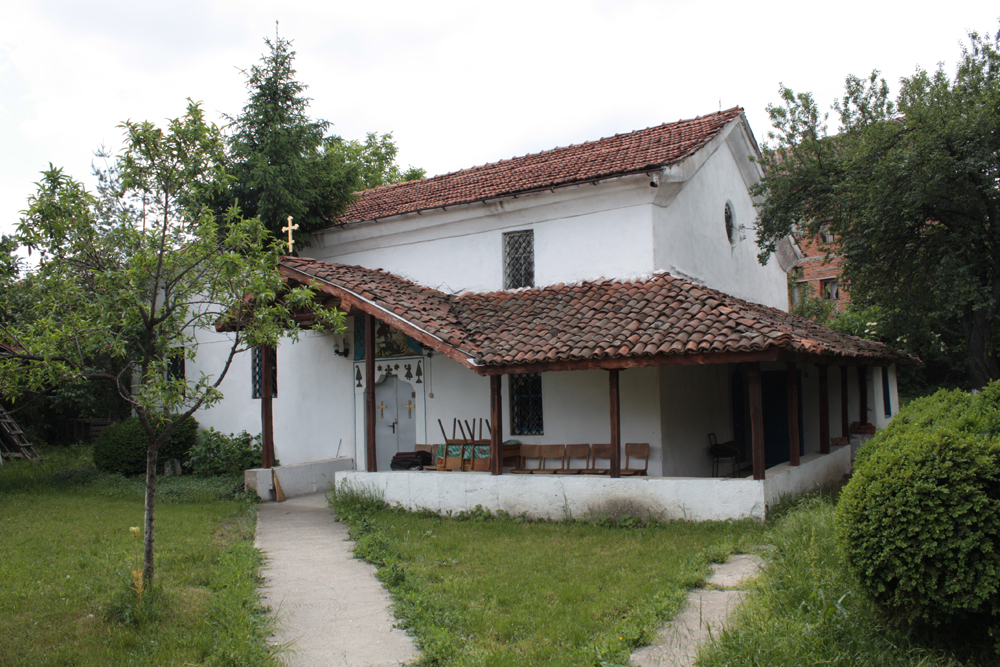
The Church of St George in Bata

The village is situated in a mountainous region, lying in the small Bata–Banya valley in the central part of the Sredna Gora mountain range. The river Banska Luda Yana runs through the northern outskirts of the settlement and flows into the main stem of the river Luda Yana less than a kilometer southeast of Bata. There are two micro reservoirs nearby offering opportunities for angling, as well as a mineral spring in the Toplika locality. The village falls within the temperate continental climatic zone. The soils are mainly cinnamon forest.

Administratively, Bata is part of Panagyurishte Municipality, located in the northwestern part of Pazardzhik Province. It has a territory of 47.704 km^{2}. It is situated just west of the second class II-37 road some 8 km south of the municipal center Panagyurishte and 37 km north of the city of Pazardzhik. Another road lead to the spa village of Banya about two kilometers to the northwest. To the southeast along the II-37 road is the village of Popintsi.

== History and culture ==
The area of Bata has been inhabited since antiquity. There several Thracian mounds in its surroundings. The ruins of the medieval Bulgarian fortress Krasen, also called Kaleto or Krasen Kale, lie a few kilometers northeast of the village. Golden and silver jewels and coins dating from different periods have been found during excavations in the area. The village was mentioned in Ottoman registers of 1586 and participated in the anti-Ottoman April Uprising of 1876.

The village has a school since 1930, a kindergarten, a medical center and a church. The local cultural center, known in Bulgarian as a chitalishte, was established in 1927 and in 1953 was named after the Bulgarian poet Nikola Vaptsarov. The chitalishte has a library of over 13 thousand books and is also the hub of the local amateur folklore group called Iglika (cowslip) famous for the presentation of typical traditions, songs and dances with many awards from different fairs. Regular events in Bata include the Kukeri festival at Zagovezni, as well as a fair at St George's Day.

== Economy ==
The village economy is mainly based in agriculture. Crops include cereals, grapes, vegetables, orchards. Livestock breeding is also developed, mainly sheep, pigs and cattle. Part of the population works in major copper extraction and processing company Asarel Medet in Panagyurishte.

== People ==
- Anelia Ralenkova, rhythmic gymnast with 4 gold medals from world and European championships
- Georgi Stoykovski, triple jumper with one gold medal from European championships
- Mariya Oryashkova, sambist, judoka, sumo wrestler and freestyle wrestler

== Gallery ==
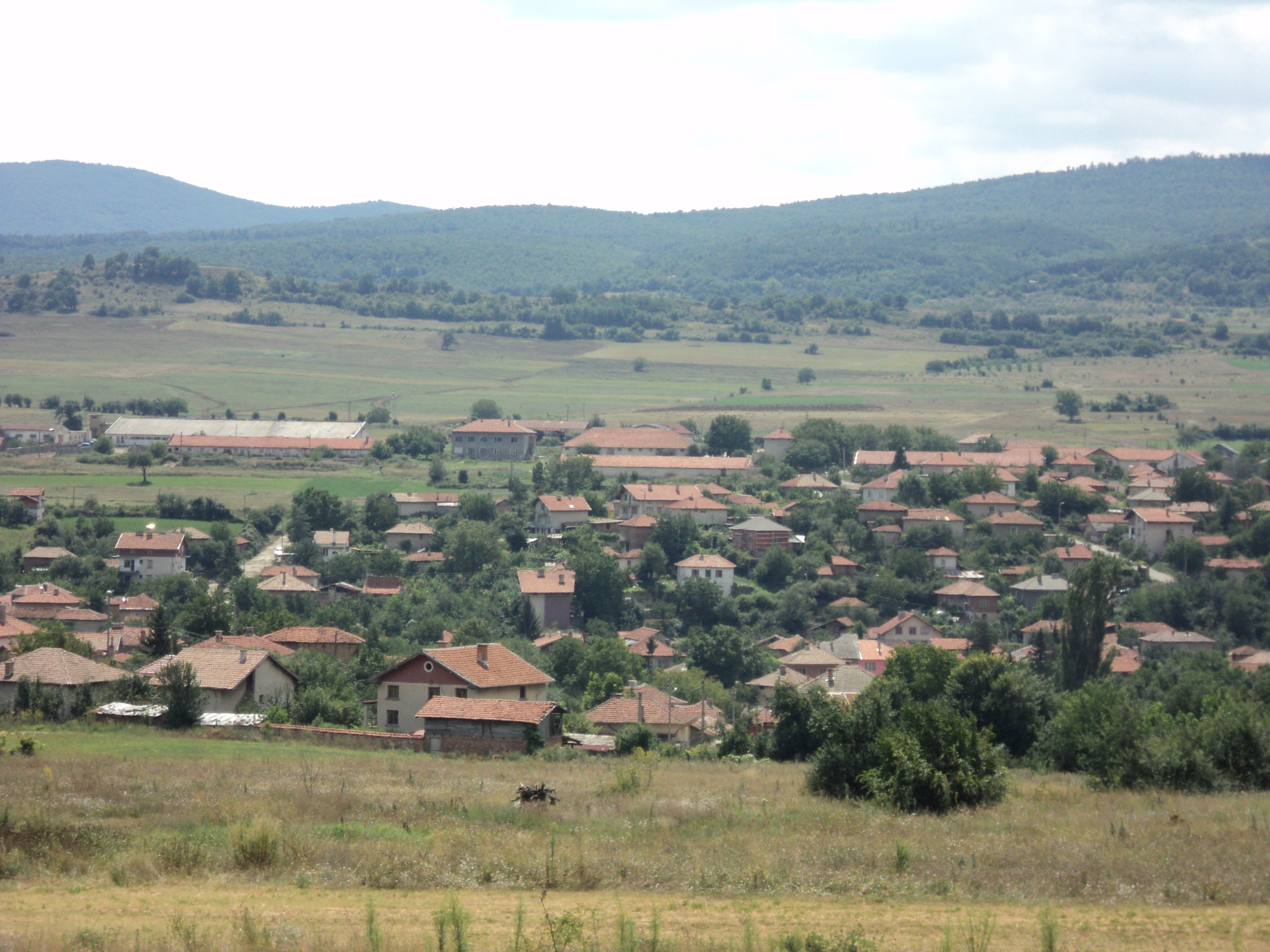
A view from II-37 road

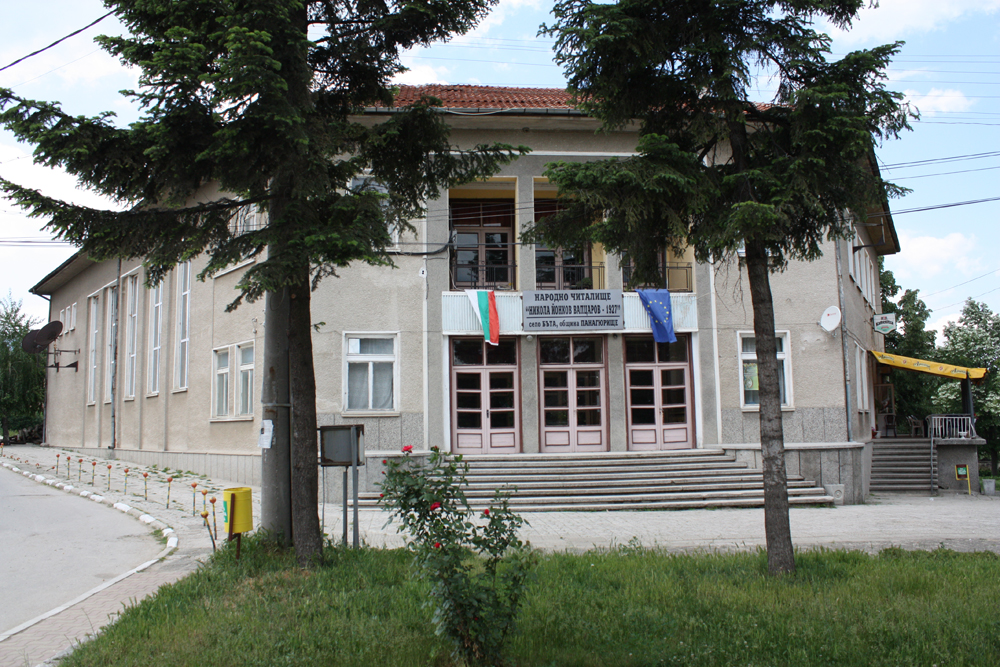
Chitalishte Nikola Vaptsarov

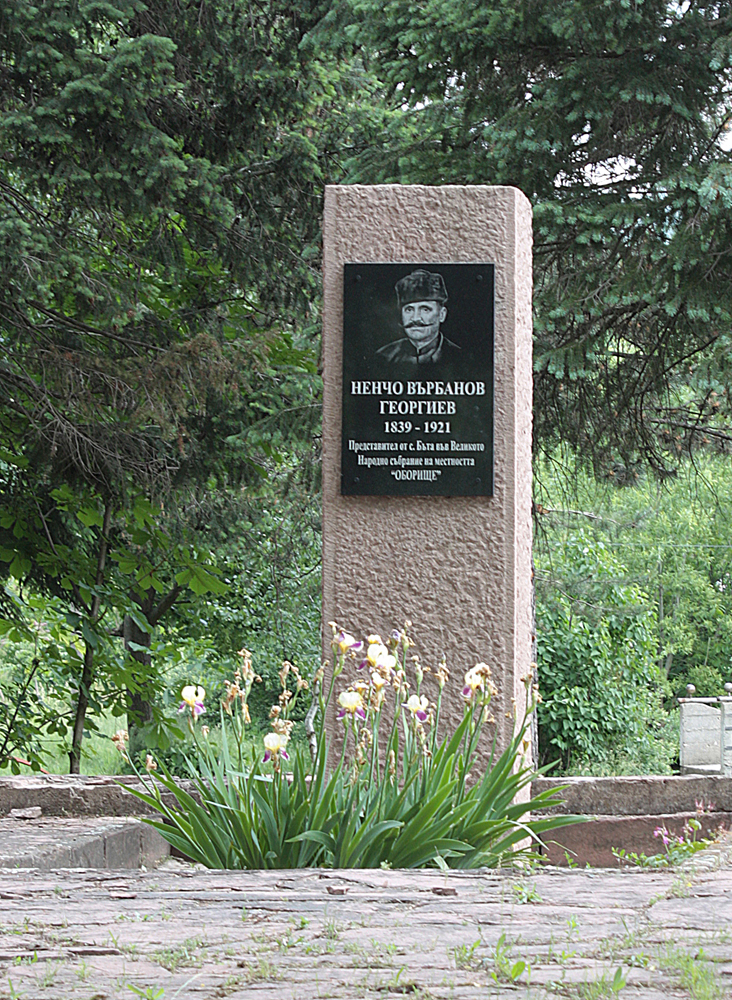
A monument in Bata

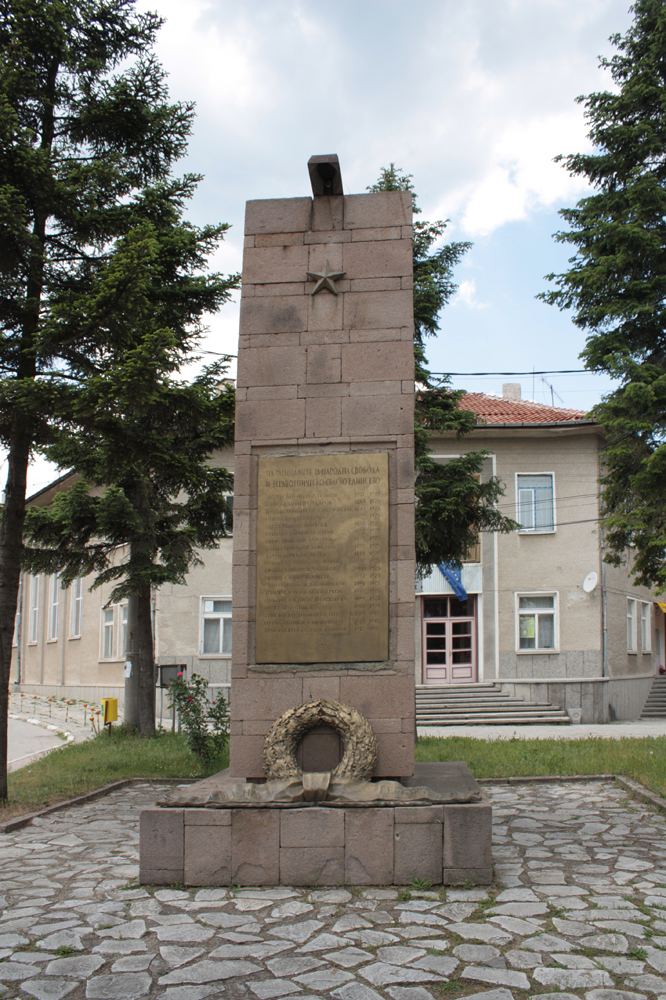
A memorial in Bata
