= Levski, Pazardzhik Province =

Levski Левски
- Village
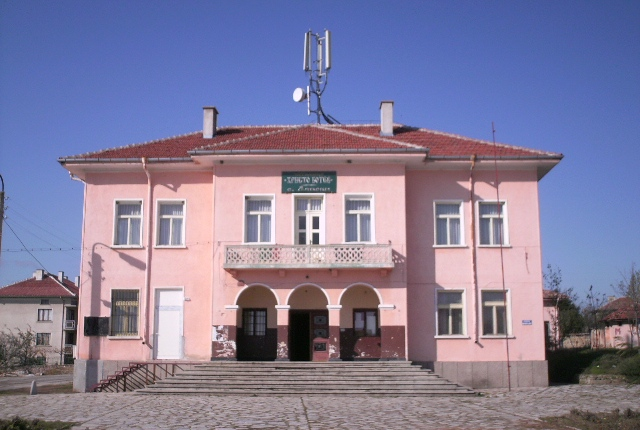
- Chitalishte Hristo Botev in Levski.

- Location of Levski
- Coordinates: 42°21′58″N 24°16′53″E
- Country: Bulgaria
- Provinces (Oblast): Pazardzhik Province

Government
  - Mayor: Slavcho Mavrov

Area
  - Total: 17.794 km^{2} (6.870 sq mi)
- Elevation: 420 m (1,380 ft)

Population (2013-12-31)
  - Total: 667
  - Density: 37.5/km^{2} (97.1/sq mi)
- Time zone: UTC+2 (EET)
  - Summer (DST): UTC+3 (EEST)
- Postal Code: 4535

Levski (Bulgarian: Левски, formerly known as Dolno Levski) is a village in Bulgaria, 23 km south of Panagyurishte and 21 km north of Pazardzhik on the main road between them. As of 2013 it had a population of 667.

== Geography ==
The village is located on the southern foothills of the Sredna Gora mountain at an altitude of 420 m. It is situated on the main road Panagyurishte-Bata-Popintsi-Levski-Saraya-Pazardzhik. The river Luda Yana flows near the village. There are four micro dams in the land of Levski.

There are grapes from which the locals produce wine and rakiya. The population is employed in agriculture, stock=breeding and mining of copper.

Many ancient Thracian mounds are scattered in the lands of the village as well as remains of a Thracian settlement.

The population is Orthodox Christian.

== History ==
The local population actively participated in the April Uprising of 1876 against the Ottoman domination and the September Uprising (1923). The village was known as Kalaglare up to 1934 and Dolno Levski up to 1987.

== Events ==
- Dzhumal (Kukeri)

== People ==
- Atanas Saev (1883 - 1963) - Bulgarian revolutionary, voivoda in the Internal Macedonian Revolutionary Organization
