= Rayna Knyaginya =

Bulgarian revolutionary

Rayna Popgeorgieva Futekova
- Rayna Knyaginya
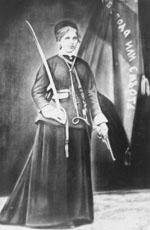
- Born: 6 January 1856; Panagyurishte, Ottoman Empire
- Died: 29 July 1917 (aged 61); Sofia, Kingdom of Bulgaria
- Resting place: Central Sofia Cemetery; 42°42′46.9″N 023°19′53.3″E
- Occupations: teacher; maternity nurse

Rayna Popgeorgieva Futekova (Bulgarian: Райна Попгеоргиева Футекова), better known as Rayna Knyaginya (Райна Княгиня), aka "Queen of the Bulgarians". She was a Bulgarian teacher and revolutionary, famous for sewing the flag of the April Uprising of 1876.

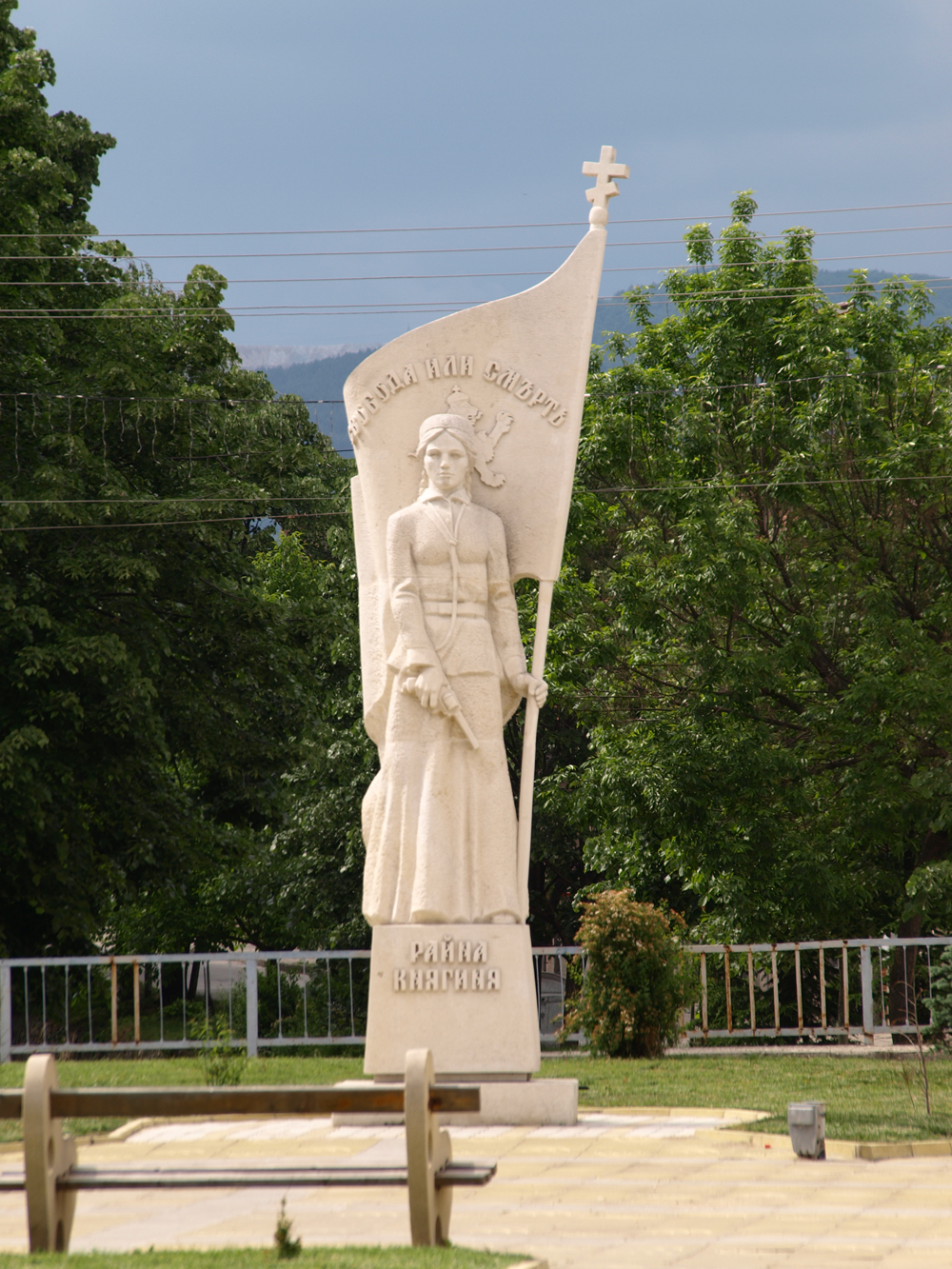
A Monument of Rayna Knyaginya in Panagyurishte

== Biography ==
She was born on January 6, 1856, in Panagyurishte, during the Ottoman Empire, and died on July 29, 1917, in Sofia, during the Kingdom of Bulgaria. She was born into the family of the priest Georgi Futekov (Георги Футеков) (1830–1876). Her mother was Nona Nalbantska (1835–1923). The family had six children: Raina, Atanas, Maria, Vasil, Pena, and Zahari.

She graduated from the Girls' School in Stara Zagora.

When she was 20 and working as a head teacher in the Panagyurishte girls' school since 1874, she was asked to sew the flag for the April Uprising by Georgi Benkovski, which she accepted.

The day the uprising was declared in April 1876, she raised the flag alongside Georgi Benkovski. Following the harsh suppression of the revolt by Ottoman forces, she was captured, subjected to repeated assaults and rapes, beaten, and deprived of food except for bread and water for over a month in the Plovdiv prison.

After the intervention of European diplomats, Raina was released and sent to Moscow. She managed to reach Moscow through Istanbul with a forged passport. She studied medicine there for three years and became a midwife, making her the first woman in Bulgaria to earn this qualification. While in Moscow, she wrote her autobiography in 1876, the first book about the uprising, which was originally published in Russian and subsequently translated into Bulgarian in 1934, and published posthumously in 1935. While in Moscow, she also managed to arrange the upbringing of 32 orphans from Panagyurishte, including her younger brother, through a ladies' charity committee.

Rayna Knyaginya went back to Bulgaria and was then invited by Kliment of Tarnovo to become a teacher in Tarnovo.

Three years later, she returned to Panagyurishte to marry Vasil Dipchev, the mayor of the town, and moved to Plovdiv. The two had five sons — Ivan, Georgi, Vladimir, Petar and Asen. Among them, four would become officers in the Bulgarian army: General Ivan Dipchev, Georgi Dipchev, Vladimir Dipchev, and Colonel Asen Dipchev (Иван Дипчев). The fifth one tragically died at the age of 15 while playing with his father's gun, accidentally shooting himself. Rayna also adopted a girl by the name of Gina.

In 1898, her husband Vasil Dipchev was elected a deputy to the National Assembly of Bulgaria and the family moved to Sofia. He soon died after that as a consequence of the Black Mosque beatings, leaving Rayna with six children, the oldest of which was only 13 years old.

Later, Rayna worked in the Sofia quarters of Orlandovtsi and Malashevtsi, maintaining strong ties with the family of Hristo Botev.

For the commemoration of the April uprising's 25th anniversary in 1901, Rayna Knyaginya prepared three copies of the original flag, two of them surviving until today and the other one being destroyed during the bombings of Sofia in World War II.

She died at the age of 61 in Sofia on July 29, 1917.

Raina Kostentseva (Райна Костенцева) wrote about her: "Raina Popgeorgieva was an extraordinary person. Always smiling, always ready to help and comfort. Modest, compassionate, humane. More than half a century has passed since her death, but I cannot forget her, nor get over it (...) Both as a person and as a midwife, she was exceptional. I know no one like her. After childbirth, she would come every day to bathe the baby and watch over the new mother. It was well known that none of her patients contracted the puerperal fever that was rampant at the time. She gave valuable advice to young mothers, loved the children she helped bring into the world as if they were her own, and cared for them like a true mother. There’s no need to mention her exceptional patriotism, known to every Bulgarian with even a little education."

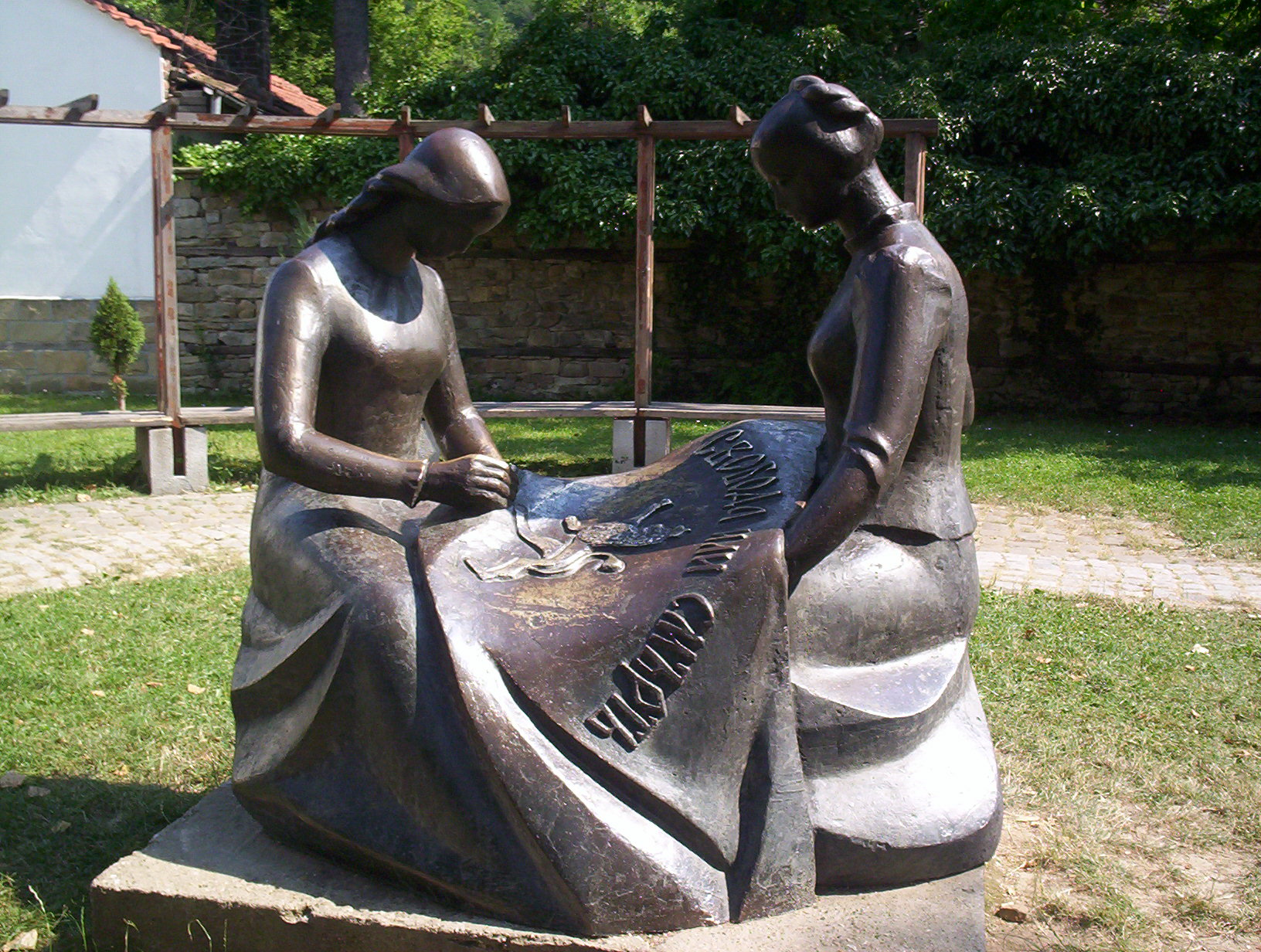
Rayna Knyaginya

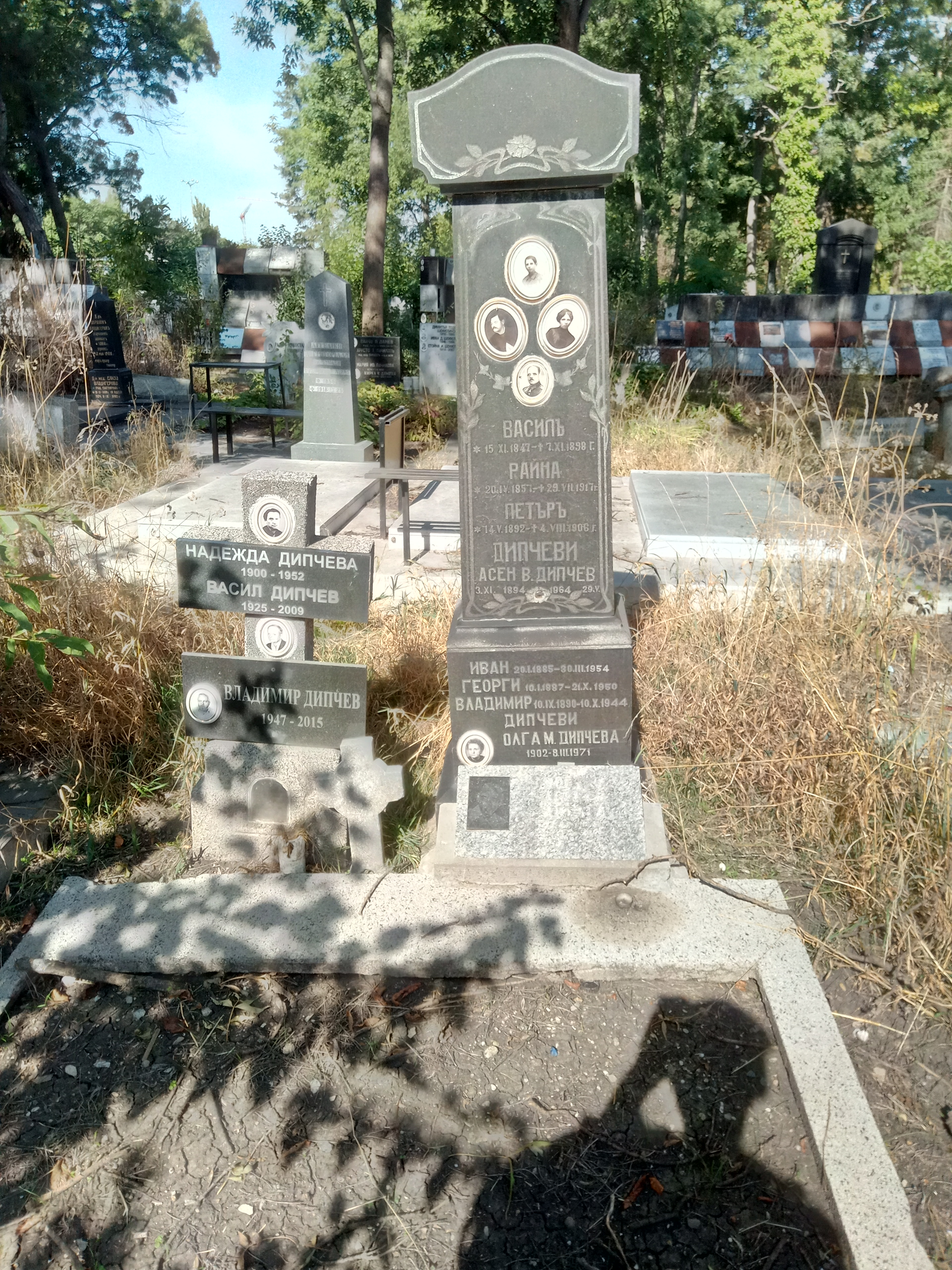
Rayna Popgeorgieva Futekova - Dipcheva's gravesite at Sofia Central Cemetery (42°42′46.9″N 023°19′53.3″E)

== Honours ==
- Rayna Knyaginya Peak, a peak on Livingston Island in Antarctica is named after her.
- A Bulgarian postage stamp with her image was issued in 2017.
