= Krasen (fortress) =

Coordinates: 42°27′47″N 24°11′53″E

Krasen (Bulgarian: Красен) or Krasen Kale (Bulgarian: Красен Кале) is a Bulgarian fortress near the village of Bata in the Pazardzhik Province. It is about 3 kilometres (2 mi) from the village and 6 kilometres (4 mi) south of the municipal center, Panagyurishte.

The castle has been dated to the 10th century AD and has since been ruined. The remains of the walls reach up to 6 metres (20 ft).
