= Church of St George, Panagyurishte =

Church in Panagyurishte, Bulgaria

Church of St George
- Църква „Свети Георги“
- Church of St George
- 42°30′26″N 24°11′09″E
- Location: Panagyurishte, Pazardzhik Province, Bulgaria
- Denomination: Bulgarian Orthodox

History
- Founded: 1856

Architecture
- Completed: 1860

The Church of St George (Bulgarian: Църква Свети Георги) is a Bulgarian National Revival church in the town of Panagyurishte, Pazardzhik Province. The church is situated 300 m to the north-west of the town's central square. It is considered the main church of the town and when built St George was among Bulgaria's largest and most imposing churches.

== History ==
The construction of the church began in 1856 and ended in 1860. It is a large edifice with two symmetrical towers and a colonnade on the western facade. The colonnade used to be painted but the frescoes were destroyed when the Ottomans burned the town during the April Uprising in 1876.

The church was restored between 1878 and 1880. The new iconostasis was made by craftsmen from Struga. The church is named after Saint George, the patron saint of Bulgaria.
