= Apriltsi Memorial Complex =

Monument in Bulgaria

Coordinates: 42°30′11.40″N 24°11′32.74″E

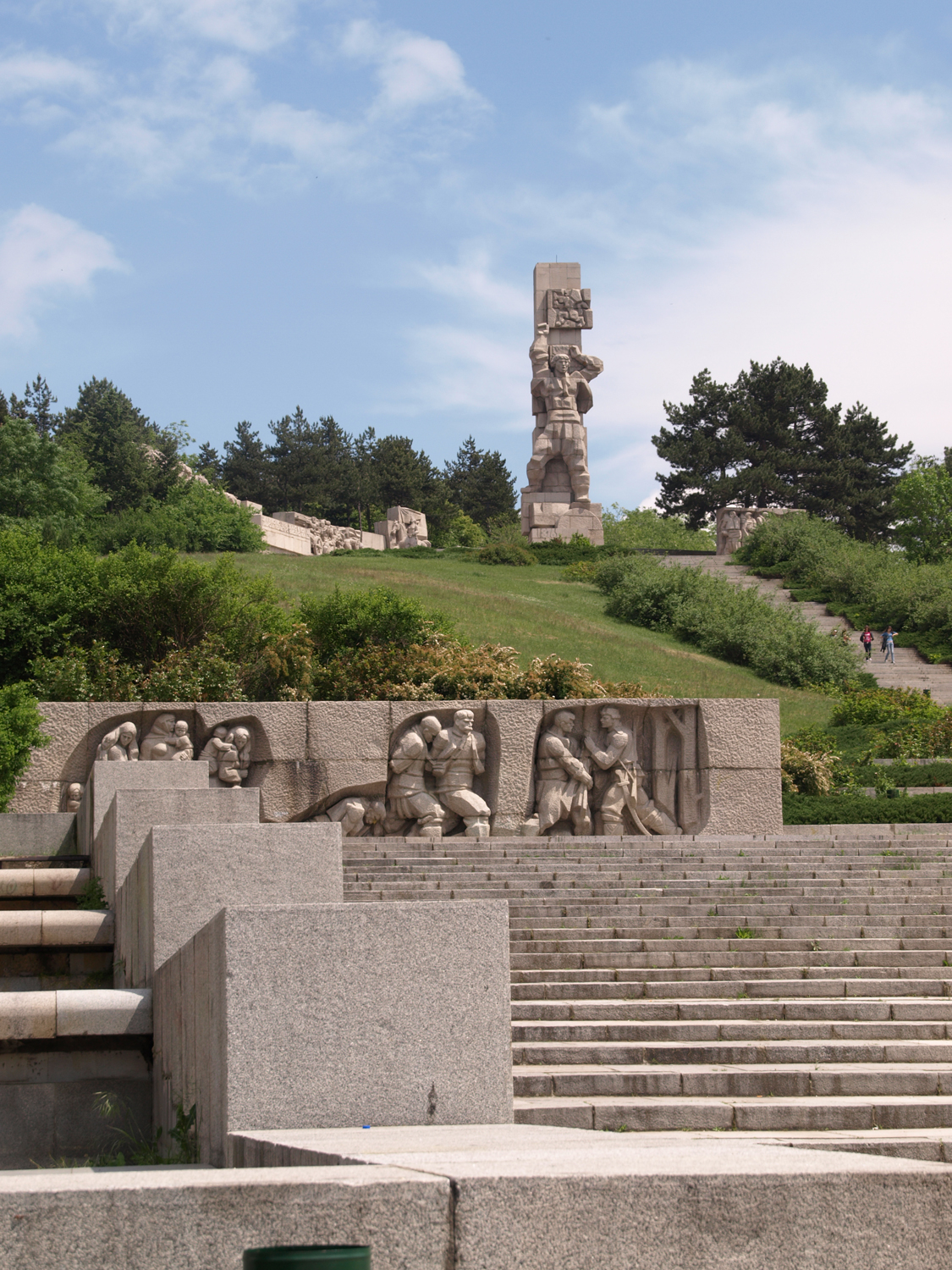
A view of the Apriltsi Memorial Complex from the central square.

The Apriltsi Memorial Complex (Bulgarian: Мемориален комплекс Априлци) is a large monument situated in the Bulgarian town of Panagyurishte. It was constructed in 1976 to commemorate the 100th anniversary of the April Uprising. It was built on the historical hill Manyovo Bardo which was one of the main positions of the Bulgarian revolutionaries against the Ottomans. The complex was designed by the architects Ivan Nikolov and Bogdan Tomalevski and the sculptors Sekul Krumov, Velichko Minekov and Dimitar Daskalov.
