= Professor Marin Drinov Elementary School =

School in Bulgaria

Coordinates: 42°30′00″N 24°11′05″E

Professor Marin Drinov Elementary School (Bulgarian: Основно Училище Професор Марин Дринов) is a school in Panagyurishte, central Bulgaria. It is the biggest school in the town with more than 1,100 pupils.
