= Asarel Medet =

Coordinates: 42°32′31″N 24°9′6″E

- Traded as: joint-stock company
- Industry: Metals and Mining
- Founded: 1964
- Headquarters: Panagyurishte, Bulgaria
- Area served: Bulgaria
- Products: Copper extraction, manufactured copper products
- Revenue: 799,945,000 Bulgarian lev (2023)
- Net income: 178,569,000 Bulgarian lev (2023)
- Total assets: 1,101,432,000 Bulgarian lev (2023)
- Number of employees: 1,200 (30 September 2022)
- Website: Asarel.com

Asarel Medet (Bulgarian: Асарел Медет) is a Bulgarian company extracting and processing copper. The mine and the processing factory are situated at 11 km to the northwest of the town of Panagyurishte in the Pazardzhik Province, Bulgaria. It extracts over 13 million tons of copper ore every year and produces copper concentrate which is sold worldwide, including to the Pirdop copper smelter and refinery at about 25 km north of Panagyurishte. The ore also contains molybdenum, nickel, gold, silver. The number of employees is 1,200, not including 400 hired in its subsidiaries. In addition, the company attracts 6,400 indirect jobs in the region and nationwide in different related services. It is the largest employer and taxpayer in Pazardzhik Province. Asarel Medet produces copper concentrate and cathode, mainly used as raw materials for copper smelters and partially for the chemical and ceramics industry. The company produces about 200 thousand tons of natural copper concentrate annually with 25% copper grade.

== History ==
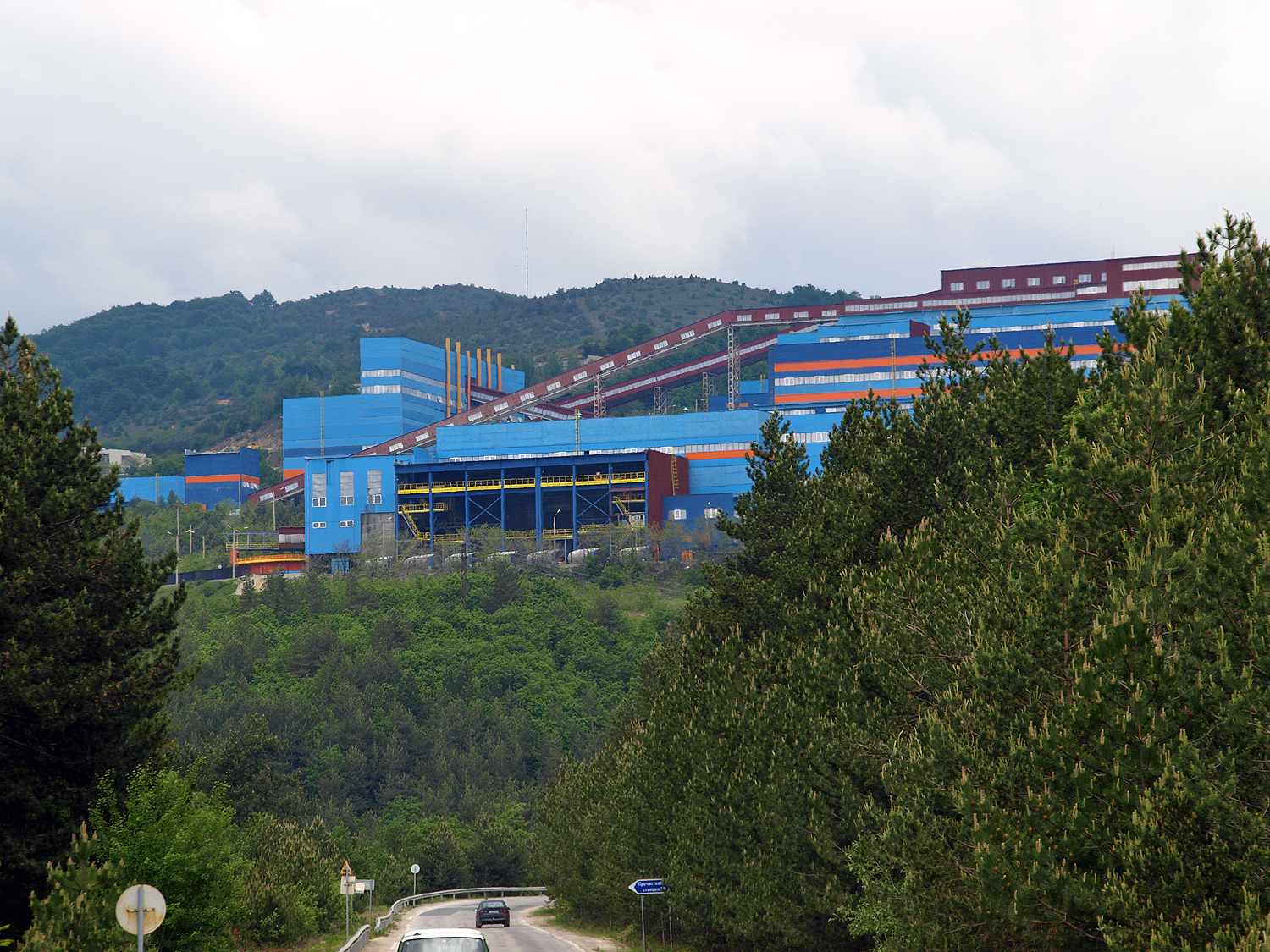
Partial view of Asarel Medet

Following the exploration of the Medet copper ore deposit in Sredna Gora mountain range in 1961–1962, the Medet mining and processing complex was inaugurated in 1964, situated at about 1 km north of the village of Panagyurski kolonii. At the time of its inauguration, Medet was the largest open pit copper mine in Europe and the third largest in the world. It was the first to organize open pit mining and processing of copper ores with cut-off grade lower than 0.4%, which was later widely applied in the industry.

The full design mining capacity of 8 million tons of copper ore per year was reached by 1972. In the period 1971–1980, it provided 80-82% of the copper ore mined in Bulgaria. The Medet mining and processing complex served as a basis for designing and building the Kremikovtsi iron ore mine near the capital Sofia, the Elatsite copper mining and processing complex in Sofia Province and the Asarel mining and processing complex some 7 km southwest of Medet. Asarel and Medet were merged in 1986 to establish the Asarel-Medet Technological Mining and Processing Complex. In compliance with the technical project, the Medet mine gradually reduced ore mining after 1984 and its activity was discontinued in early 1994.

The Asarel copper mine with 0.45% copper grade started operation in 1976 and the copper processing factory was inaugurated in 1989. In 2004 began the implementation of a large-scale $100 million project with investment in thorough equipment renovation, technology modernisation and personnel development.

== Other activities ==
Since 2012 the company has invested over €75 million in social projects in Panagyurishte Municipality, including modernisation of the Hospital of Panagyurishte, construction of the multifunctional Arena Assarel sports hall and the hall hosting the Panagyurishte Treasure in the town's Museum of History.
