= Panagyurishte =

Town in Pazardzhik, Bulgaria

Panagyurishte Панагюрище
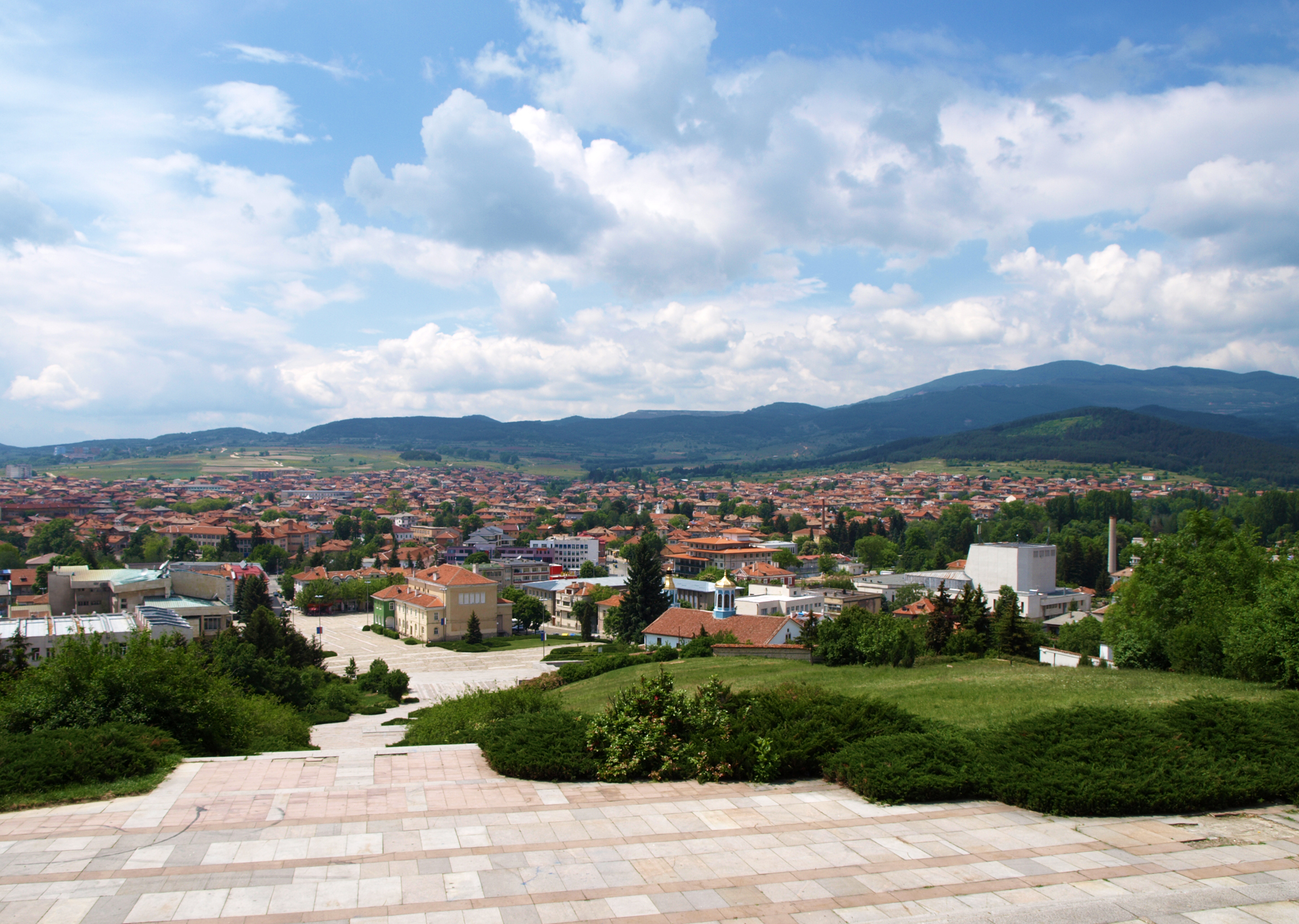
- View of Panagyurishte from the Apriltsi Memorial Complex.

- Coat of arms

- Location of Panagyurishte
- Coordinates: 42°30′N 24°11′E
- Country: Bulgaria
- Province (Oblast): Pazardzhik

Government
  - Mayor: Zhelyazko Gagov
- Elevation: 550 m (1,800 ft)

Population (2021)
  - City: 15,275
  - Urban: 21,430
- Time zone: UTC+2 (EET)
  - Summer (DST): UTC+3 (EEST)
- Postal Code: 4500
- Area code: 0357

Panagyurishte (Bulgarian: Панагюрище, also transliterated Panagjurište, pronounced [panɐˈɡʲuriʃtɛ]) is a town in Pazardzhik Province, Southern Bulgaria, situated in a small valley in the Sredna Gora mountains. It is 91 km east of Sofia, 43 km north of Pazardzhik. The town is the administrative center of the homonymous Panagyurishte Municipality. Panagyurishte is an important industrial and economic center, the hub of the Bulgarian optical industry and a major copper extraction and processing site. According to the 2021 census, it had a population of 15,275. Panagyurishte is a town of significant historical importance, being the center of the 1876 April Uprising against the Ottoman Empire. The renowned Thracian Panagyurishte Treasure was found near the town.

== Geography ==
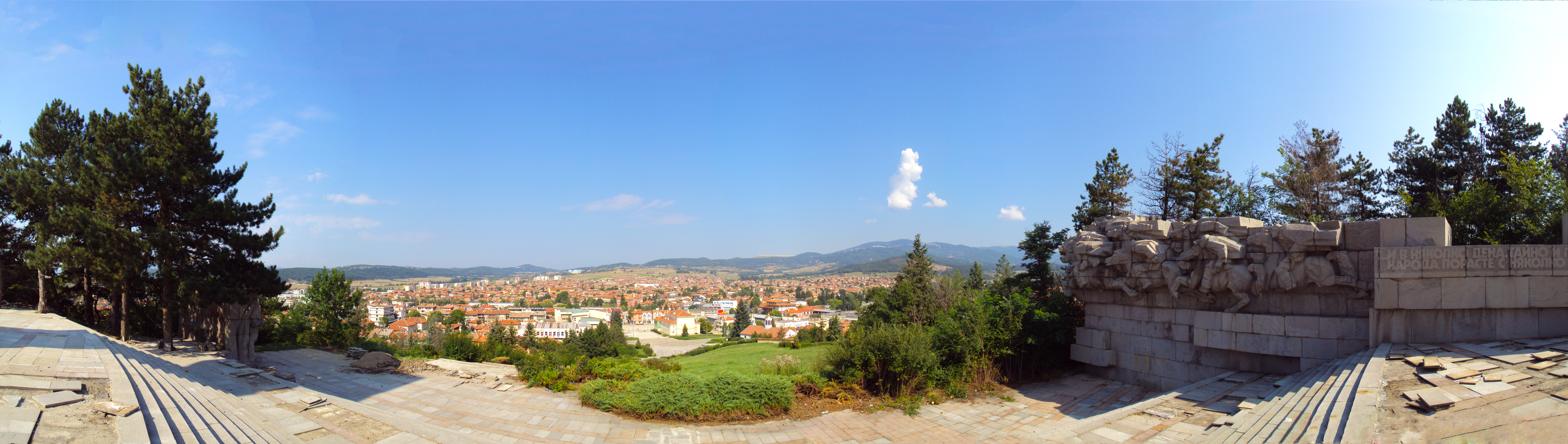
View from the Apriltsi Memorial Complex in town of Panagyurishte

The town is located in a mountainous area. It lies in the Sredna Gora mountain range. To the north of it, near Panagyurski kolonii, is Mount Bratia (1519 m). The Luda Yana river flows through the town, which joins with its other part after the village of Popintsi to form the Luda Yana River. The railway station is the last station on the Plovdiv-Panagyurishte railway line. Through the town passes the second class II-37 road, which connects the town of Dospat in the Rhodope Mountains through Zlatitsa Pass in the Balkan Mountains with the main road A2 - Hemus motorway (at the village of Dzhurovo, Pravets Municipality). Panagyurishte is the administrative centre of the homonymous municipality, which includes 9 other settlements. Neighbouring settlements are: the resort settlement Panagyurski kolonii (15 km to the north), the village of Oborishte (10 km to the west), the village of Banya (11 km first to the south and then to the west), the village of Bata (8 km to the south) and the town of Strelcha (12 km to the east).

== History ==
There are dozens of Thracian mounds in the vicinity of the town. In one of them - the mound "Mramor", a burial of a Thracian chieftain was discovered. Not far from it, in 1949, the now world-famous Panagyurishte Treasure was discovered, dating back to the 4th-3rd centuries BC. It is made of pure gold and weighs 6.164 kg. Copies of the nine unique vessels are exhibited in the Historical Museum in the town, while the originals are in museums around the world and in Bulgaria.

The convenient location, the nature and the favourable climate of the area attracted people to this region in the Middle Ages. The ruins of the Bulgarian fortresses of Krasen and Dushkovchenin have been preserved.

The foundation of Panagyurishte is associated with the dramatic times after the Ottoman invasion. The name comes from "panagyur" - (from Greek: πανηγυρι, fair), as on the banks of the Luda Yana there was a small fair. Later, the market moved to the place where the town of Pazardzhik is now located.

In the Middle Ages there was a settlement near the modern town, near the fortress of Krasen some 6 km south of the current location. In the course of the Bulgarian-Ottoman Wars large part the population was killed and the rest had to move to a new location. The survivors called themselves levents due to their bravery in the struggle with the invaders.

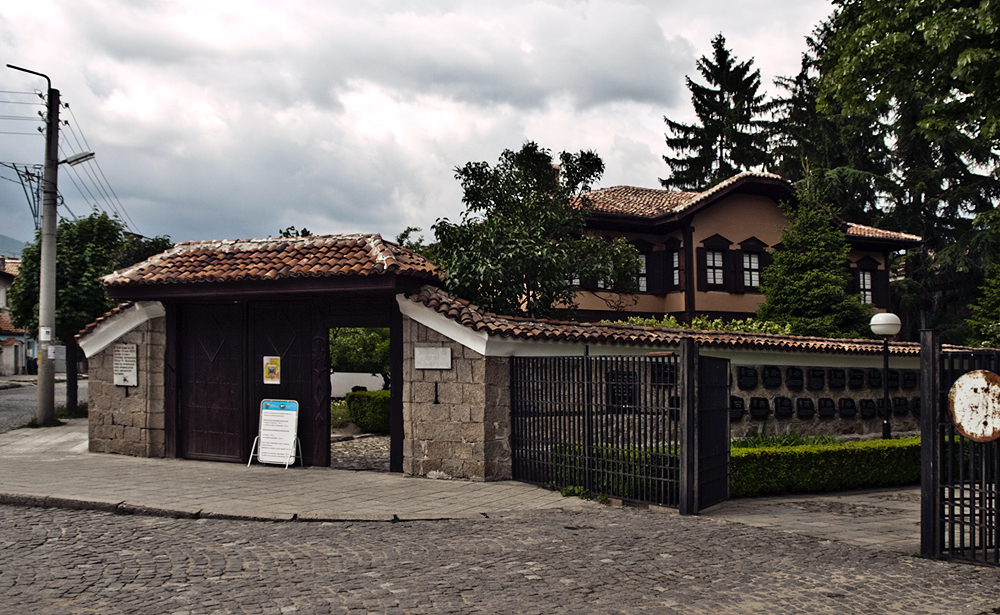
Traditional architecture of Panagyurishte. Edifice of the Museum of History

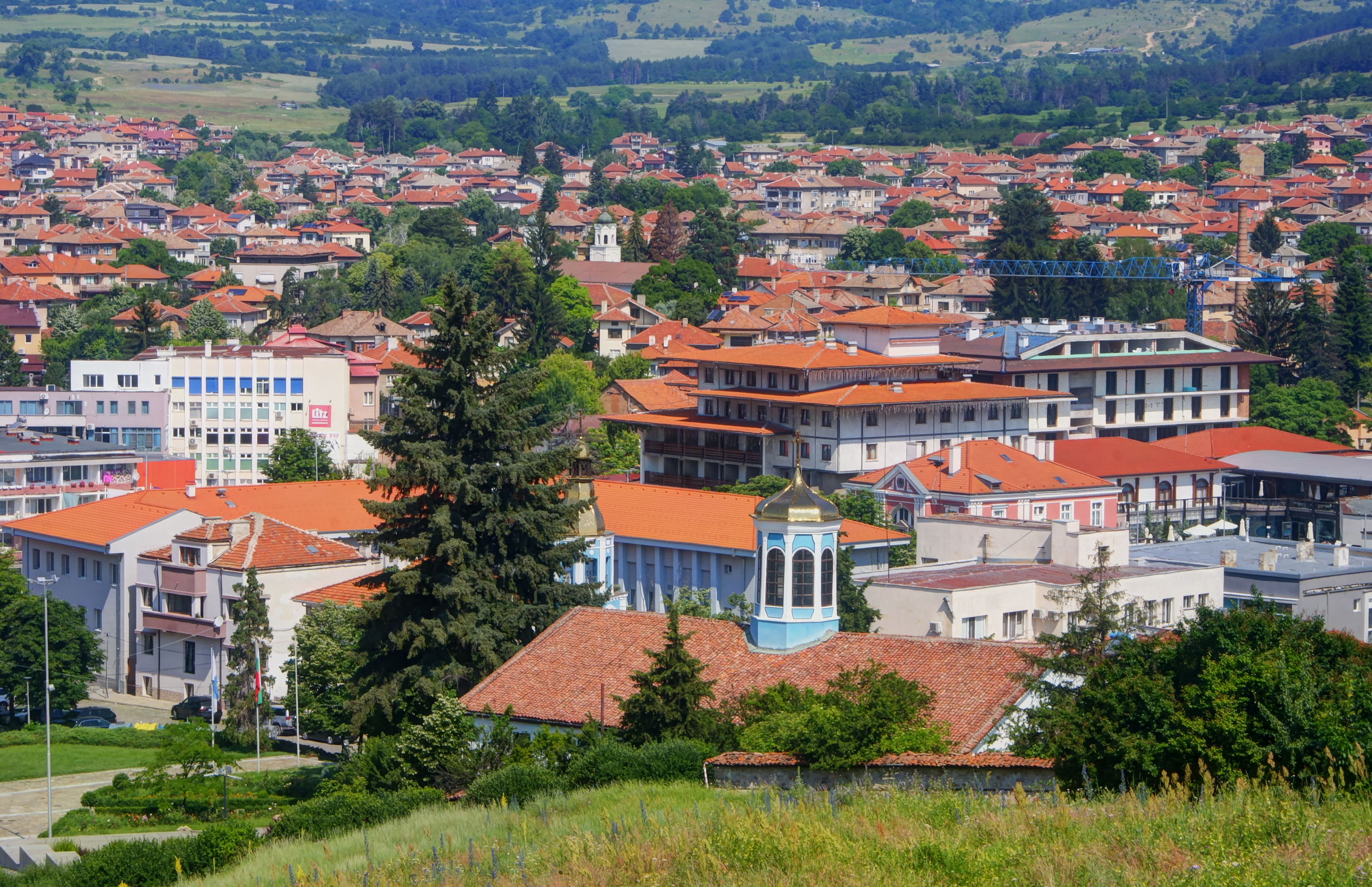
A view of Panagyurishte

When the Turks seized the village of Asenevtsi near Sliven which guarded the road to the capital of the Bulgarian Empire Tarnovo, its population moved to Panagyurishte. Another wave of Bulgarian refugees came in the 15th century after rebellions in Macedonia (Debar, Prilep, Kastoria and others). Even today the population uses language which is characteristic for both eastern and western Bulgarian dialects and the town is in the so-called Yat border. It was also known as "Otlukköy" during Ottoman rule.

At the beginning of the 19th century. Panagyurishte reached a significant economic and cultural peak. A number of crafts related to the well-developed cattle breeding developed here. Goldsmithing, which later made the town famous for the Panagyurishte School of Gold. More than 2,500 craftsmen, calves and apprentices worked in the various trades. In the courtyard of the Historical Museum, there are reenactments of these traditional crafts. According to testimonies of American missionaries who visited the town in 1861, it had 12,500 Bulgarian inhabitants who maintained a large school.

The economic and spiritual upsurge helped the idea of national liberation to be accepted in Panagyurishte. In the autumn of 1870, Vasil Levski founded a revolutionary committee here, and the meeting was held in the house of Ivan Duhovnikov, preserved to this day in the courtyard of the Historical Museum. Panagyurishte is primarily known for being the center of the April Uprising against the Ottoman rule in Bulgaria in 1876. On 14 April 1876, the first Bulgarian Great National Assembly was held in the historical locality of Oborishte. It was capital of the Fourth Revolutionary District which was the main center of the rebellion. The uprising was bloodily suppressed after 10 days of declared freedom, and the town was burnt down and almost completely destroyed by the Ottoman Turks. Lady Strangford arrived from Britain later that year with relief for the people of Bulgaria following the massacres that followed the April Uprising. She built a hospital at Batak and eventually other hospitals were built at Radilovo, Panagiurishte, Karlovo, Petrich and Perushtitsa.

At the end of the 19th century, the foundations of carpet weaving, a Persian type, were laid in the town. In the 20th century, the artisan nature of the work was gradually replaced by factory industry.

In March 1923 near Panagyurishte there was a big flood after the river Luda Yana flowed and flooded the surrounding area.

After the 1950s the town experienced an economic boom. Textile industry, ore mining, high technologies in opto-mechanical and electronic instrumentation were developed. In the 1990s, the introduction of the market economy unleashed the initiative and entrepreneurship of the citizens. There are over 2000 registered private companies and trading companies. Education in the town is constantly developing. Cultural activity is concentrated in the Videlina Community Centre, the Memorial House Theatre and the Historical Museum, and numerous monuments.

== Demographics ==
=== Population ===
Panagyurishte had a fast-growing population across the years, mainly during the Communist era, where its highest peak was 22,011, recorded in 1985. After the democratic changes, the population promptly emigrated to other parts.

Panagyurishte
Year	1887	1910	1934	1946	1956	1965	1975	1985	1992	2001	2005	2009	2011	2021
Population	8,757	9,512	10,198	12,014	14,000	18,315	20,634	22,011	21,131	19,994	18,890	17,959	17,584	16,553
	Highest number 22,011 in 1985													
Sources: National Statistical Institute, citypopulation.de, pop-stat.mashke.org, Bulgarian Academy of Sciences

=== Religion ===
The population believes in mainly Christianity, Eastern Orthodoxy being predominant, as are most of the churches. There is also one Evangelical church in the town. Muslims are not largely represented among the population, since during the Ottoman rule, the city was forbidden to them. This was due to two facts: during the time of the Janissary, the town was obliged to pay the Devshirme, which gave it the privilege of not being inhabited by Turks. Later, the Bulgarian population had to guard the passes through the Middle Forest, which gave the same privilege.

== Economy ==
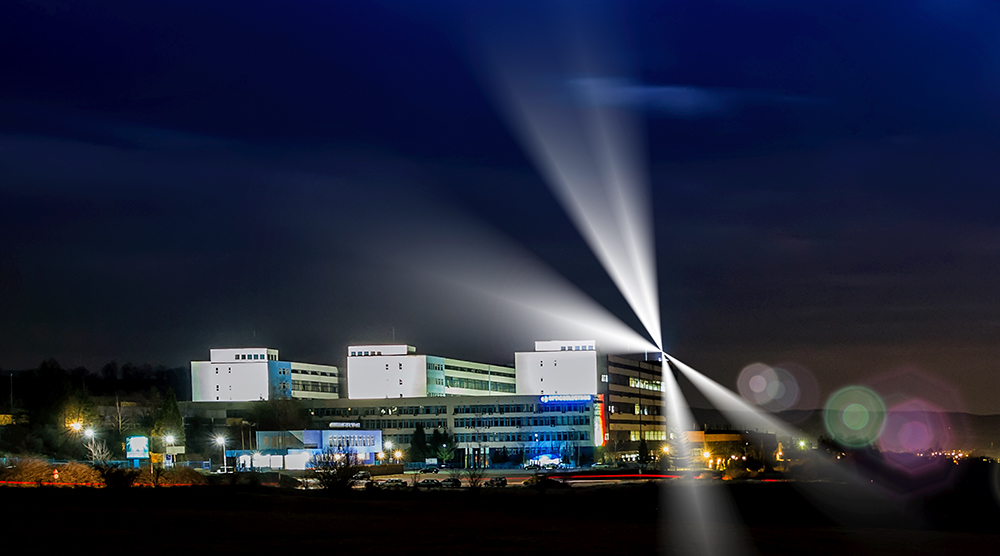
The factory of Opticoelectron

After the Second World War Panagyurishte was transformed into a large industrial center. The Asarel Medet copper extracting and processing plant is the largest single employer in the municipality with over 1,200 direct employees and also the biggest one in the Balkans. Annually it extracts and processes over 13 million tons of copper ore and produces 200 thousand tons of copper concentrate sold worldwide, including to the Pirdop copper smelter and refinery in Pirdop north of Panagyurishte.

The town is the hub of the Bulgarian optical industry with two main companies — Opticoelectron (650 employees) and Optix (600 employees), operating production facilities in the town and in neighbouring Strelcha and Popintsi. They and manufacture a wide range of military and civilian procducts, such as optical sights; thermal imaging devices; night vision goggles, scopes and systems; surveillance cameras; infrared lenses, etc. Another company in the field, Micro-View Endoskopie Optik J.S.C., was founded in 2002 as a private Bulgarian-German joint stock company and specializes in the production of optical components for endoscopic equipment with applications in medicine and technology. There are two big textile plants: "Ryton" (880 employees) and "Bultex" (680 employees). There is also a plastics factory, "Bunay" with some 190 workers and a number of smaller enterprises.

== Transport ==
There are roads leading to the north (Panagyurski kolonii), south (Popintsi), west (Oborishte) and east (Strelcha). The main road is the second class II-37 road in direction north–south, leading to Zlatitsa to the north and Pazardzhik to the south. Panagyurishte has bus connections to Sofia, Plovdiv and Pazardzhik, as well as nearby villages. The town is served by the Bulgarian State Railways as the terminus of railway line No. 81 Plovdiv–Panagyurishte.

== Education and healthcare ==
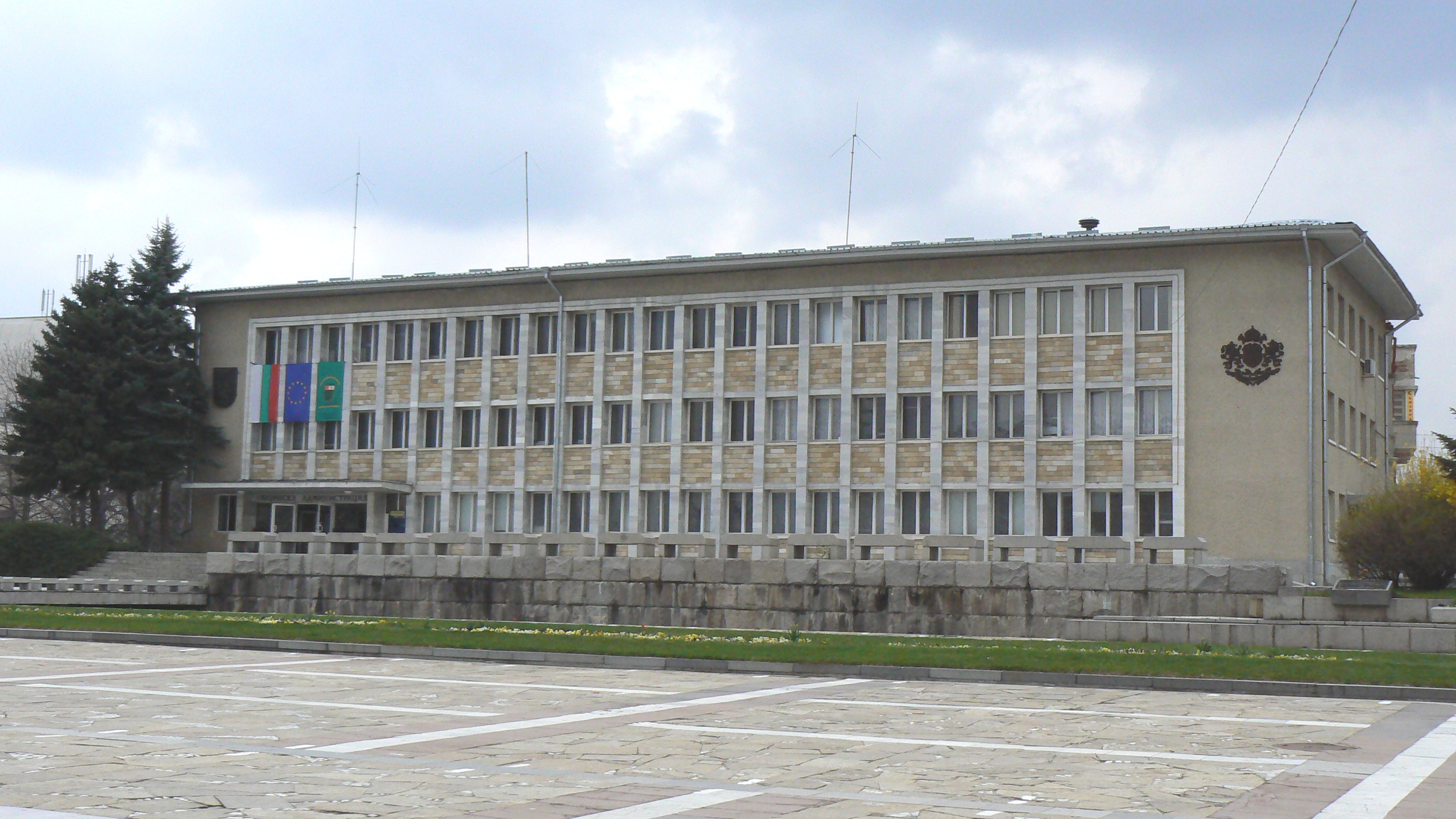
The Town Hall of Panagyurishte

The two largest schools are the elementary "Prof. Marin Drinov" with more than 1,100 pupils and secondary "Nesho Bonchev". Other large schools include the Optical Technikal School, Mining Technical School, "20th April" elementary school, "Sv. sv. Cyril and Metodius" elementary school and others.

A large regional hospital is located in the southernmost outskirts of the town on the western banks of the Luda Yana river. There is also a large polyclinic in the center as well as numerous private doctor and dentist cabinets.

== Municipality ==
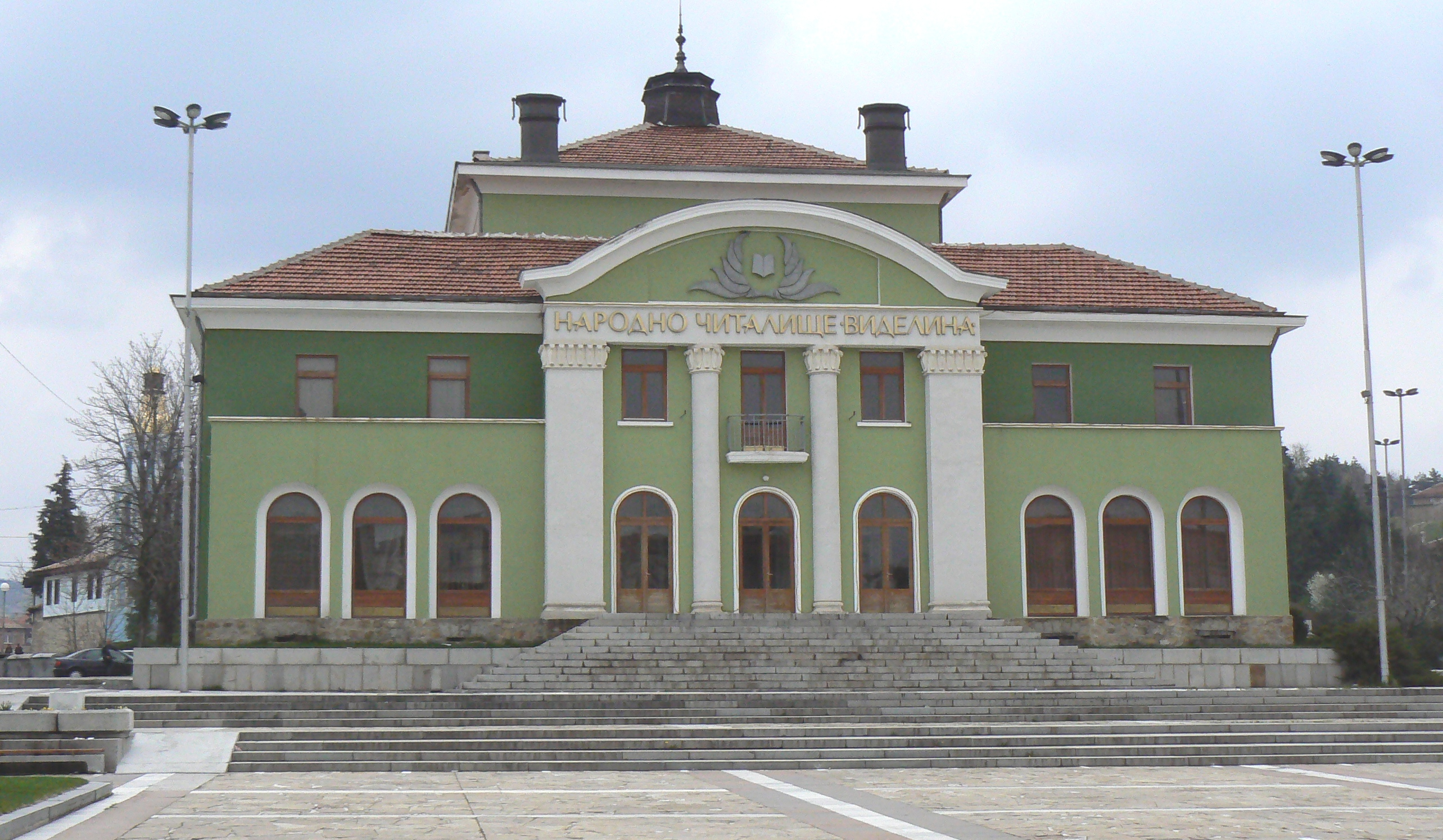
The chitalishte "Videlina"

The town is a center of the Panagyurishte municipality which includes 9 villages: Popintsi, Oborishte, Banya, Bata, Elshitsa, Levski, Panagyurski kolonii, Poibrene and Srebrinovo, as well as the town itself.

== Tourism ==
Panagyurishte is overshadowed in tourism by nearby Koprivshtitsa, which has a much larger collection of conserved Bulgarian Revival style houses because they paid off their city to the Ottomans instead of fighting. Like Koprivshtitsa, Panagyurishte has a picturesque location in the Sredna Gora mountains, and is one of the towns associated with the historic April Uprising in 1876. The town also gained fame for the Panagyurishte golden treasure discovered there in 1949 and the Apriltsi National Memorial Complex erected in 1976 in honor of the 100th anniversary of the April Uprising. It is situated on the historic hill above the town known as Manyovo Bardo. It is also near the mineral water spas of Banya, and recreational facilities in Panagyurski kolonii.

== Places of interest ==
=== Museums ===
==== House-Museum of Rayna Knyaginya ====
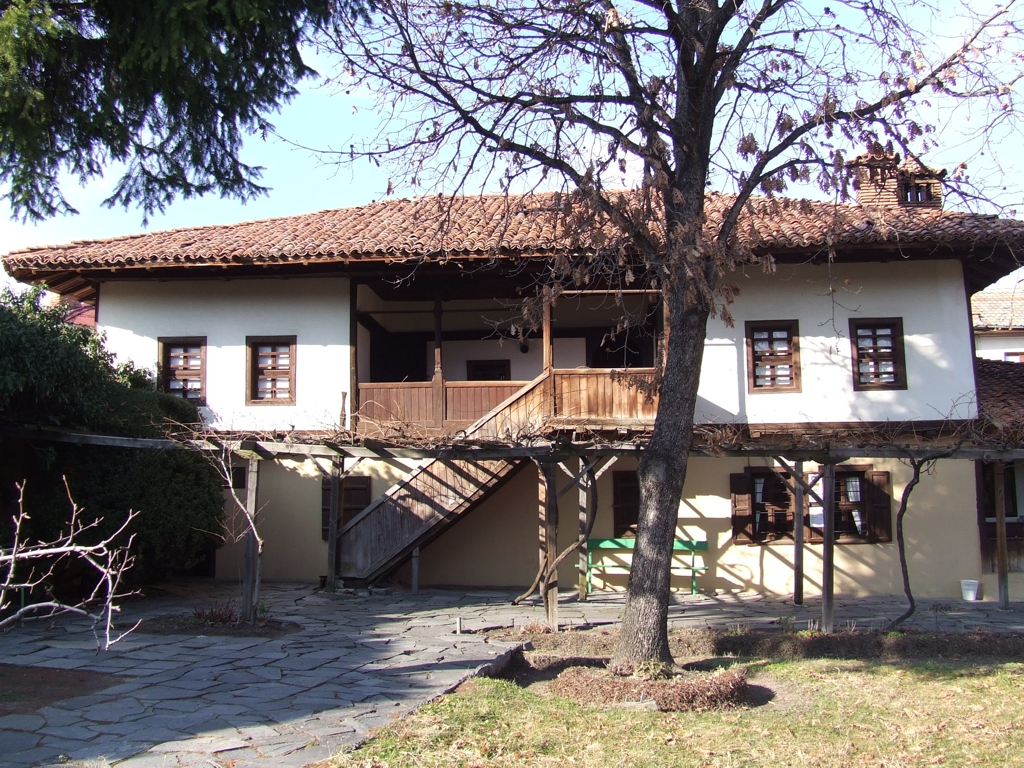
House-Museum Rayna Knyaginya

In the courtyard of the house, an inscription preserved there states that the Middle Gothic asymmetrical house was made in 1673 and its first owners were Taso and Miho. After 200 years, Rayna Knyaginya was born in the house on 18 January 1856. She is known for her sewing of flag of the April Uprising of 1876.

The house was opened as a museum on 3 May 1950 and during 1979-1981, the house had major restorations carried out. The first floor includes a documentary for the life of Rayna Knyagina. The second includes the example of the environment where she lived. In 1992, the heirs of Rayna Knyagina gifted the house to the Panagyurishte Municipality. It is now preserved as a monument of national importance and culture.

==== Panagyurishte History Museum ====
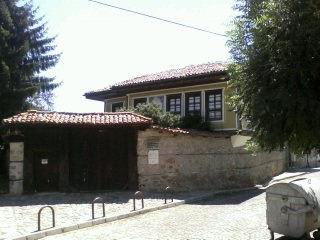
Tutev's House where the 1876 April Uprising started

The history museum was created on 20 January 1951 and was approved by the Collegium of the Committee on Culture and Art on 27 December 1966. It includes over 6000 volumes of scientific literature and a depository organized in a separate building.

The exposition of the museum includes documents and objects from the 19th century, also preserved archaeological finds from excavations of the lands near Panagyurishte. The gold treasure is also kept in the museum. The history museum complex includes the houses of Petar Dudekov, Ivan Tutev and Marin Drinov.

===== House-museum Petar Dudekov =====
The house of Dudekov was created in the period 1853-1856 and was owned by the merchant of the same name, who was then murdered by the Ottomans. It was a Plovdiv type of house with symmetrical planning. Its interior is rich with vast amounts of decoration. By that period, the interior was considered luxury. Many elders, women and children took refuge in the house after the town was invaded by the Bashi-bazouk. The house was restored during the years of 1990-1996 and it is considered an architectural monument from the Bulgarian renaissance. Lady Strangford developed her charitable mission here in the autumn of 1876.

===== House-museum Ivan Tutev =====
The house of Ivan Tutev was built in the period 1873-1874. The owner was a local craftsman, merchant and revolutionary Ivan Doychev Tutev. The original building was constructed in the 17th century which was burnt down after the Kirdzhalis attacks of the late 18th and early 19th centuries. The house was painted by Marko Galabov and in 1947, it was donated to the municipality for it to be a museum. In 1950, the first partial restoration was made, then a second one in 1975-1976. In the period 1988-1991, a third and final major restoration of the house was carried out. It is now a monument of culture.

===== House-museum Marin Drinov =====
The house of Marin Drinov was created in the 1830s and was owned by the Drinov family. They were described as examples for the struggles for national liberation, cultural uplift and restoration of the Bulgarian state. Vasil Levski and Georgi Benkovski took shelter in the house between 1 and 2 February 1876. In 2008, it was opened as a museum which included ethnographic exhibitions.

=== Churches ===
==== Church of St. George ====
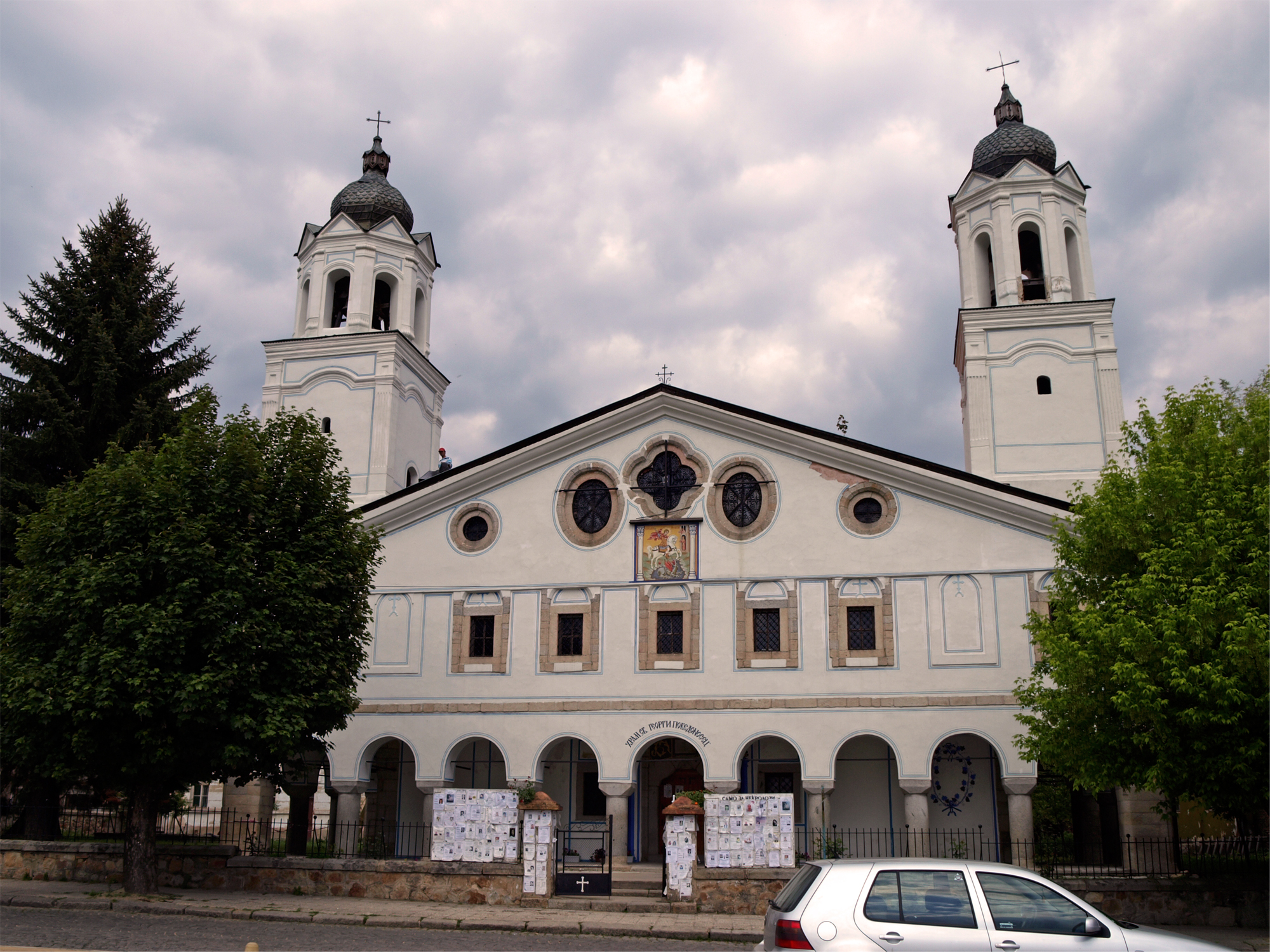
The Church of St George in Panagyurishte

The church was built in the period 1856-1860, when the economy was rising in the town. During its construction period, many citizens from the upper neighbourhoods in Panagyurishte were supporting it financially. The most generous of all was Pencho Hadzhilukov, later died in the April Uprising. The masters of the church were Nikola German and Gancho Trifonov, from the small village of Smolsko. The technicians were from Constantinople. The church's iconostasis and its carved decoration was made by the Debar Art School. It was consecrated in 1860.

During the April Uprising, Ottoman artillery shelled the church, burning everything and leaving only the walls. After liberation, many people gathered to reconstruct the church and a new iconostasis was made by woodcarving masters from Struga. Two bell towers were erected in 1882, with one serving was the town clock.

==== Church of St. Bogoroditsa ====
The church was built in the period 1818-1823, replacing the old church of St. Todor, since it couldn't accommodate its population. The new one, had masters building it from Bansko and its carved wooden decoration from the Debar Art School. In 1834, the church was damaged, but later fixed. During the April Uprising, the church suffered severe damage, when it was burnt and most of the iconostasis was destroyed. After liberation, thanks to masters from Bratsigovo and carvers from Struga, the church was rebuilt in 1878-1880.

The church's architecture consists of a three-aisled pseudo-basilica, an apse and narthex. The roof has a semi-cylindrical vaulted roof. Also there is a bell tower in the corner of the churchyard.

=== Apriltsi Memorial Complex ===
The Apriltsi Memorial Complex which commemorates the April Uprising dominates the sky-line of the town and can be seen from almost every neighbourhood. It was built on the top of a hill just above the central square and includes several granite compositions which encircle the main figure. It can be reached from the center by numerous stairs.

There are several places of interest in the vicinity of the town. The resort village Panagyurski kolonii, literally "the colony of Panagyurishte" is located at 15 km north of the town. It is very popular with the local population, as many of the citizens have summer houses there. There is a ski run and dense beech forests rich in different species of berries and mushrooms. At 6 km to the east is the famous Oborishte locality where the plan of the April uprising was discussed and accepted by delegates from all over the province. Today there is a monument there which is popular tourist attraction.

== Panagyurishte treasure ==
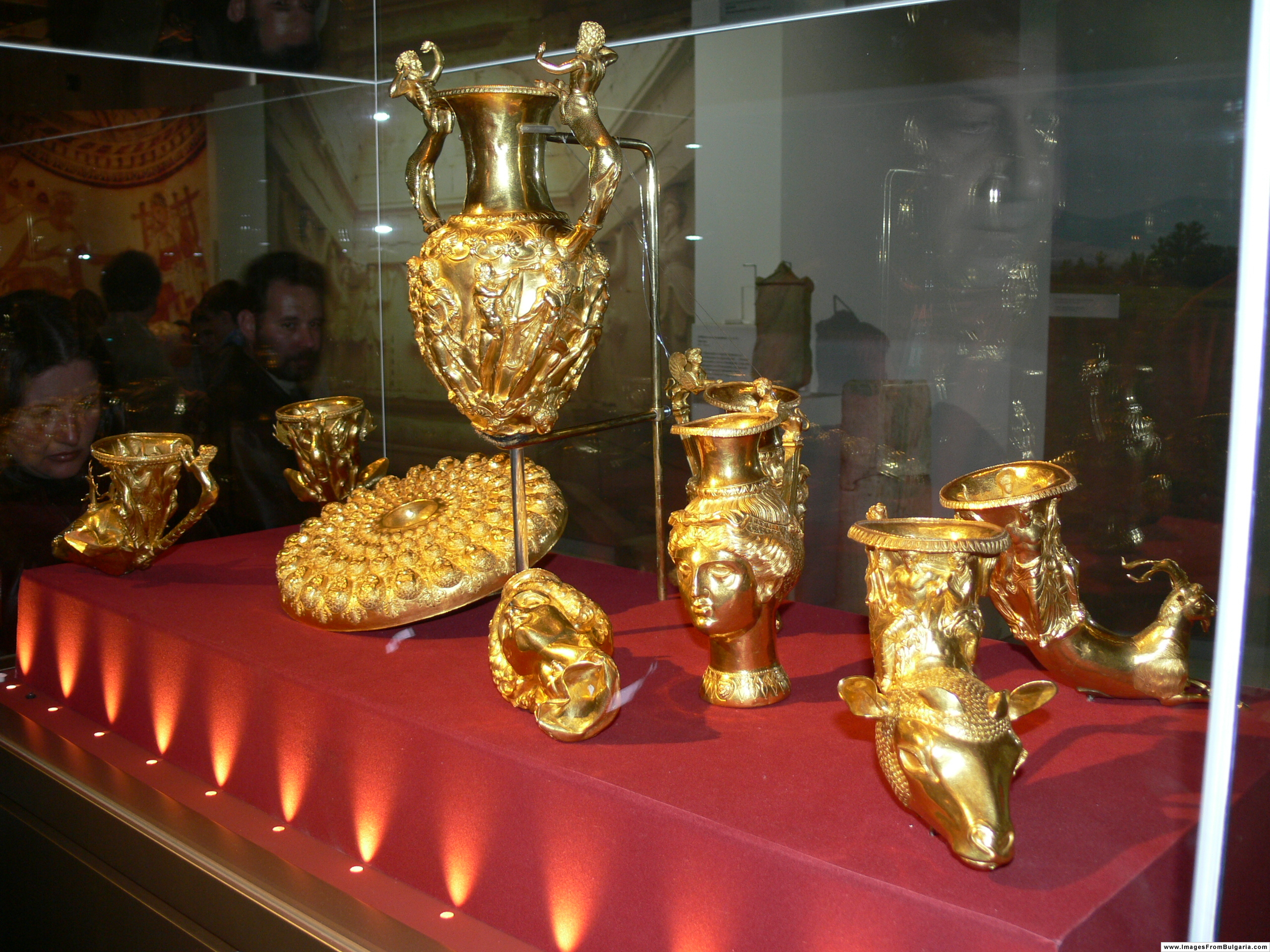
The Panagyuriste treasure

At around ten o'clock on the morning of the 8th December 1949, three brothers – Pavel, Petko and Michail Deikovi – came across unusual objects while processing a new layer of clay near the "Merul" tile factory in Panagyurishte. They unearthed a set of vessels comprising a phial and eight rhytons, one shaped like an amphora and the others like heads of women or animals. Dating to the turn of the fourth and third century BC, the find was remarkable, not only for consisting of over 6.146kg of pure gold, but also for the originality of the vessels' forms. The set has become a Thracian treasure and one of the most valuable possessions of the National Historical Museum.

== Notable people ==
Notable natives include historian and philologist Marin Drinov (1838–1906), writer and literary critic Nesho Bonchev (1839–1878) and revolutionary Rayna Knyaginya (1856–1917). In 1893 the Bulgarian writer Elin Pelin was enrolled in a school in Panagyurishte.

- Atanas Shopov (1855 - 1922) - Bulgarian writer and diplomat
- Velko Koroleev (1798 - 1903) - Bulgarian educator, book publisher
- Georgi Bradistilov, professor (1904 - 1977) - mathematician
- Georgi Geshanov (1872 - 1907), Bulgarian revolutionary of the All-Russian Revolutionary Army
- Georgi Kukureshkov (1867 - ?) - Bulgarian military, colonel
- Georgi Shopov (1880 - 1932) - Tolstoyist, refused military service, corresponded with Leo Tolstoy
- Damascene of Veleška (Dimitar Dipchev) (1817 - 1878) - Bulgarian clergyman, the first exarch metropolitan of Veleška
- Delcho Ilchev (1885 - 1925) - entomologist
- Delcho Lulchev (1935 - 1985) - civil engineer
- Doncho Chuparinov (1894 - 1925) - Bulgarian revolutionary, member of IMRO
- Emanuil Dzhudzhev (1835 - 1908) - Bulgarian teacher, public figure, revolutionary and clergyman
- Yoncho Berberov (1873 - 1953) - Bulgarian military man, entrepreneur
- Bishop Kyrill (Yonchev) (1920 - 2007) - Archbishop of the Orthodox Church in America's Diocese of Western Pennsylvania and Bulgarian Diocese.
- Kiril Petrov Perfanov (1890 - 1979) - documentary film director and screenwriter, actor
- Kraycho Samohodov - flag bearer of Benkovski's Cheta
- Luka Ivanov (1867 - 1906) - Bulgarian soldier and revolutionary, Voivode of VOMOR
- Lachezar Dimitrov Tsotzorkov (1945 - 2017) - industrialist, patriot and philanthropist
- Marin Drinov (1838 - 1906) - Renaissance scholar and statesman, first president of the Bulgarian Literary Society (BAS)
- Nesho Bonchev (1839 - 1878) - Renaissance scholar, the first Bulgarian literary critic and pedagogue
- Nikola Belopitov (1901 - 1972) - Bulgarian engineer, inventor and businessman
- Orcho Voivoda (1829 - 1911) - centurion of the April Uprising
- Pavel Bobekov (1852 - 1877) - Chairman of the Provisional Government and a thousandaire during the April Uprising
- Pavel Deliradev (1879 - 1957) - Bulgarian revolutionary of the All-Union Revolutionary Army
- Paraskeva Dzhukelova (1970 - ) - Bulgarian drama and film actress
- Petko Koychev (1888 - 1907) - Bulgarian revolutionary, member of VMORO, who died in the Battle of Nozhot
- Petar Karapetrov (1843 - 1905) - Bulgarian revivalist, book publisher and historian
- Rayna Knyaginya (1856 - 1917) - Bulgarian teacher and revolutionary
- Sava Radulov (1817 - 1887) - Bulgarian Revivalist and clergyman
- Stefan Atanasov, Bulgarian revolutionary of the All-Union Revolutionary Army, a comrade of Vasil Pachadzhiev
- Stoichko Angelov (1888 - ?), Bulgarian revolutionary of the All-Russian Revolutionary Forces, a lieutenant of Nikola Dosev
- Stoyu Bradistilov (1863 - 1930) - Bulgarian military leader, lieutenant general
- Stoyan Tsvetkov (1930 - 2007) - Bulgarian agronomist, breeder-geneticist, doctor of agricultural sciences
- Yanko Pavlov (1888 - 1974) - Sculptor
- Damaskin Veleshki (Dimitar Ivanov Dinchev) (1817–1878) - Bulgarian churchman
- Carla María de la Soledad Royo-Villanova y Urrestarazu, princess of Panagyurishte, Comité de honor de fundacionarsnova, wife of Prince Kubrat

== Honour ==
Panagyurishte Nunatak on Greenwich Island in the South Shetland Islands, Antarctica is named after Panagyurishte.

== Gallery ==
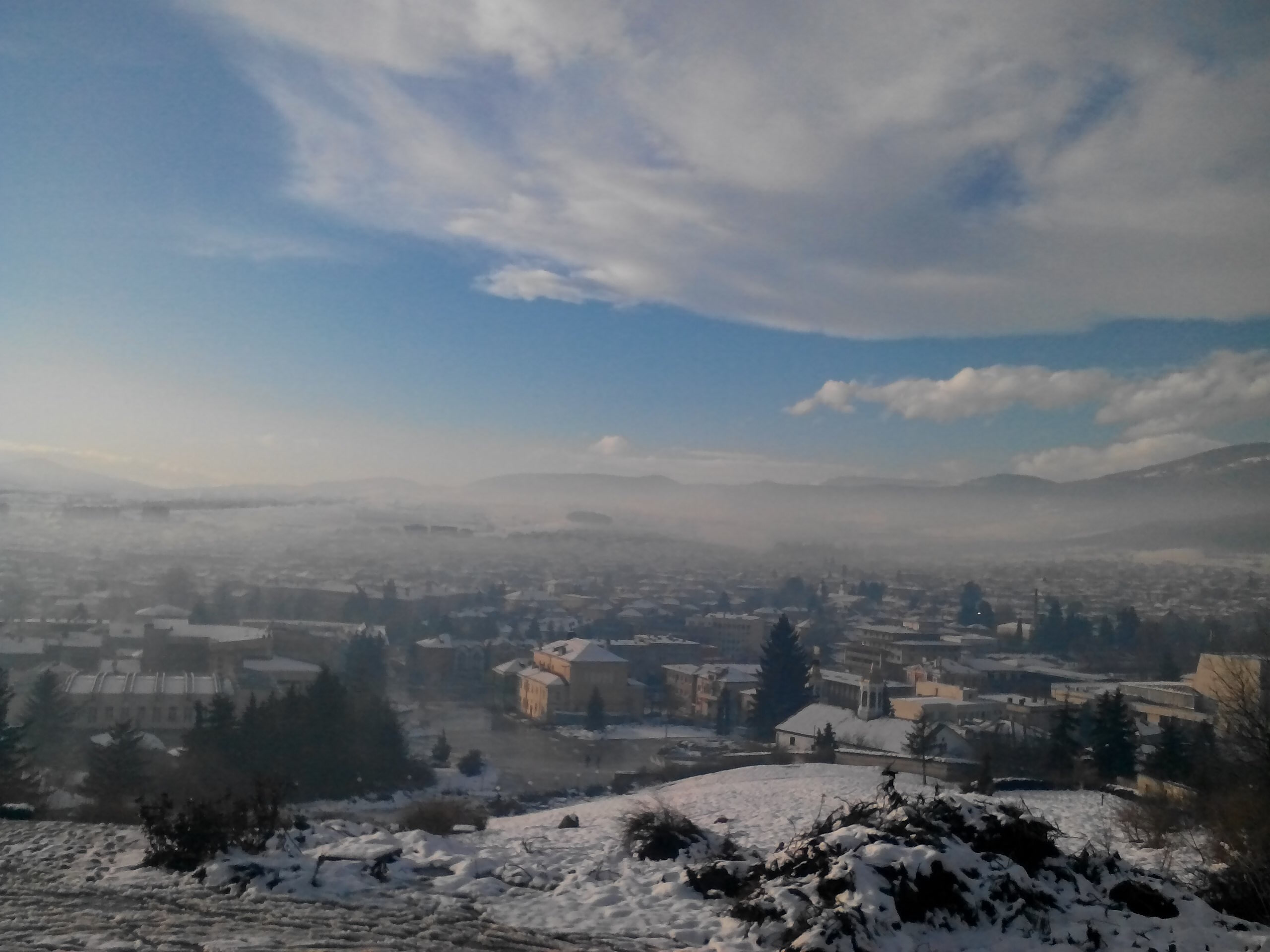
Panagyurishte during winter

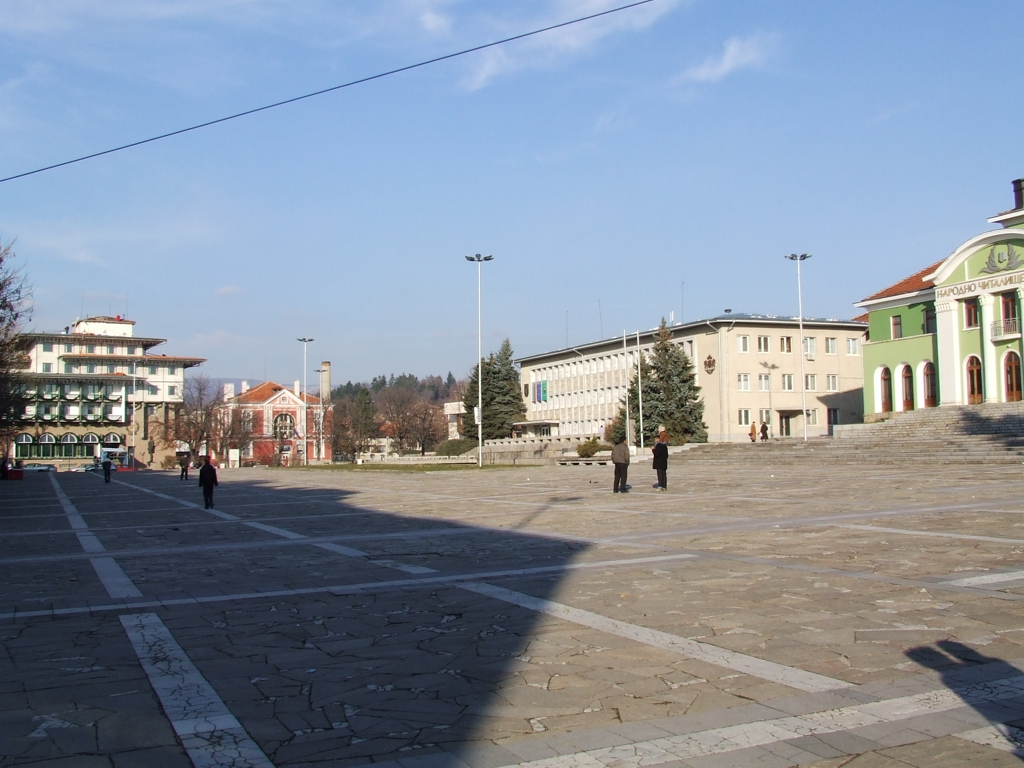
Centre

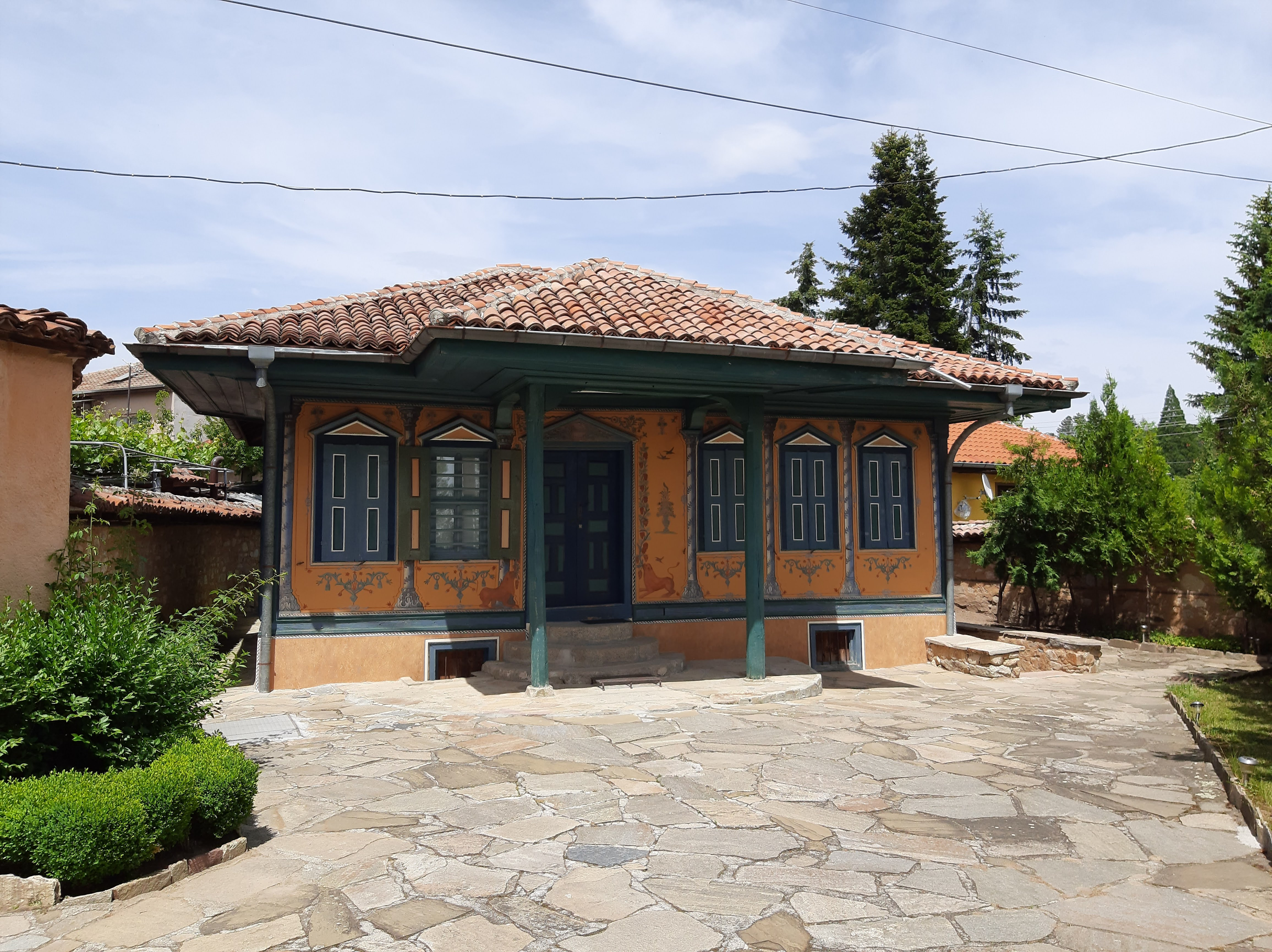
Lekova House

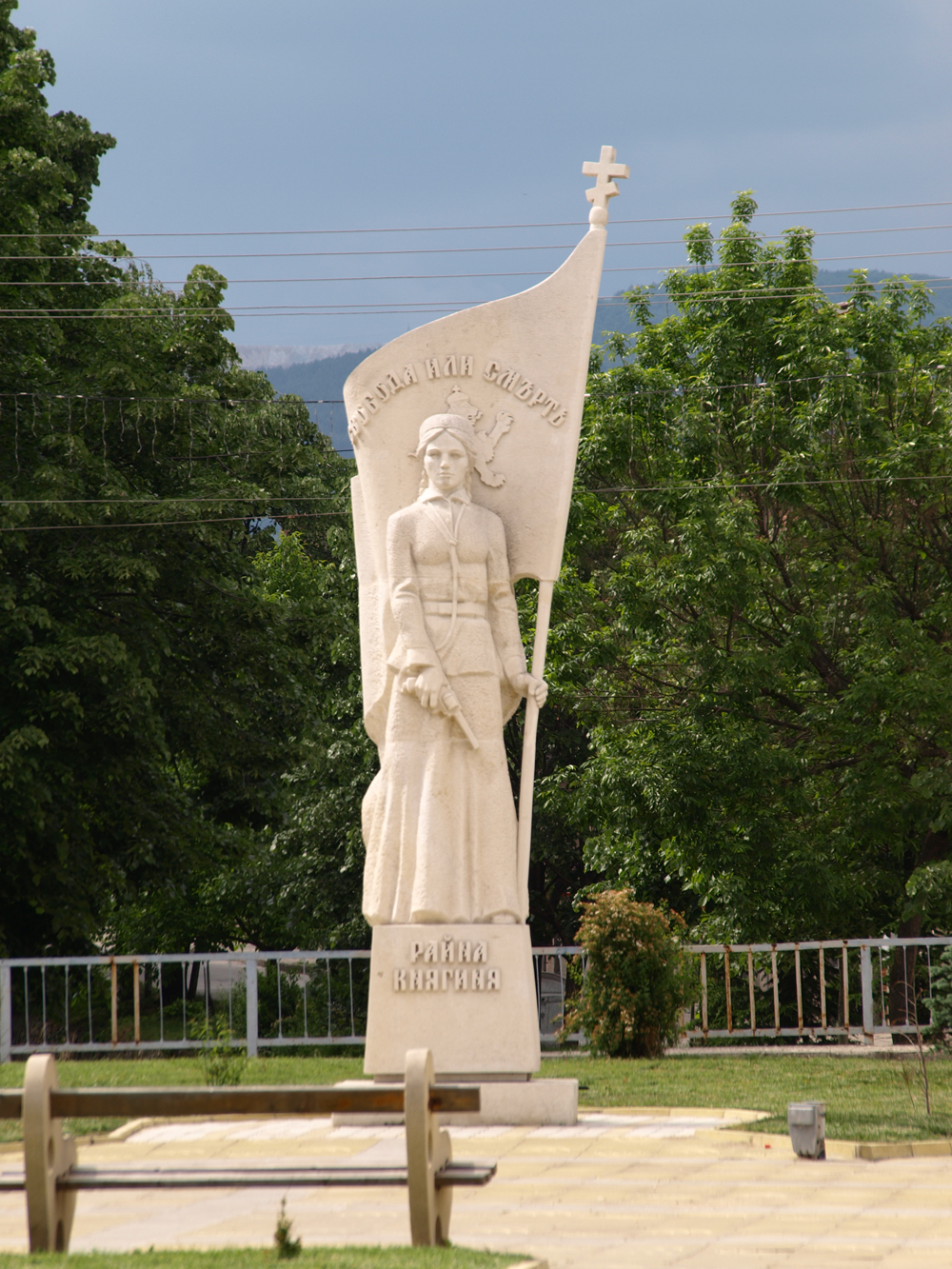
Statue of Raina Knyaginya

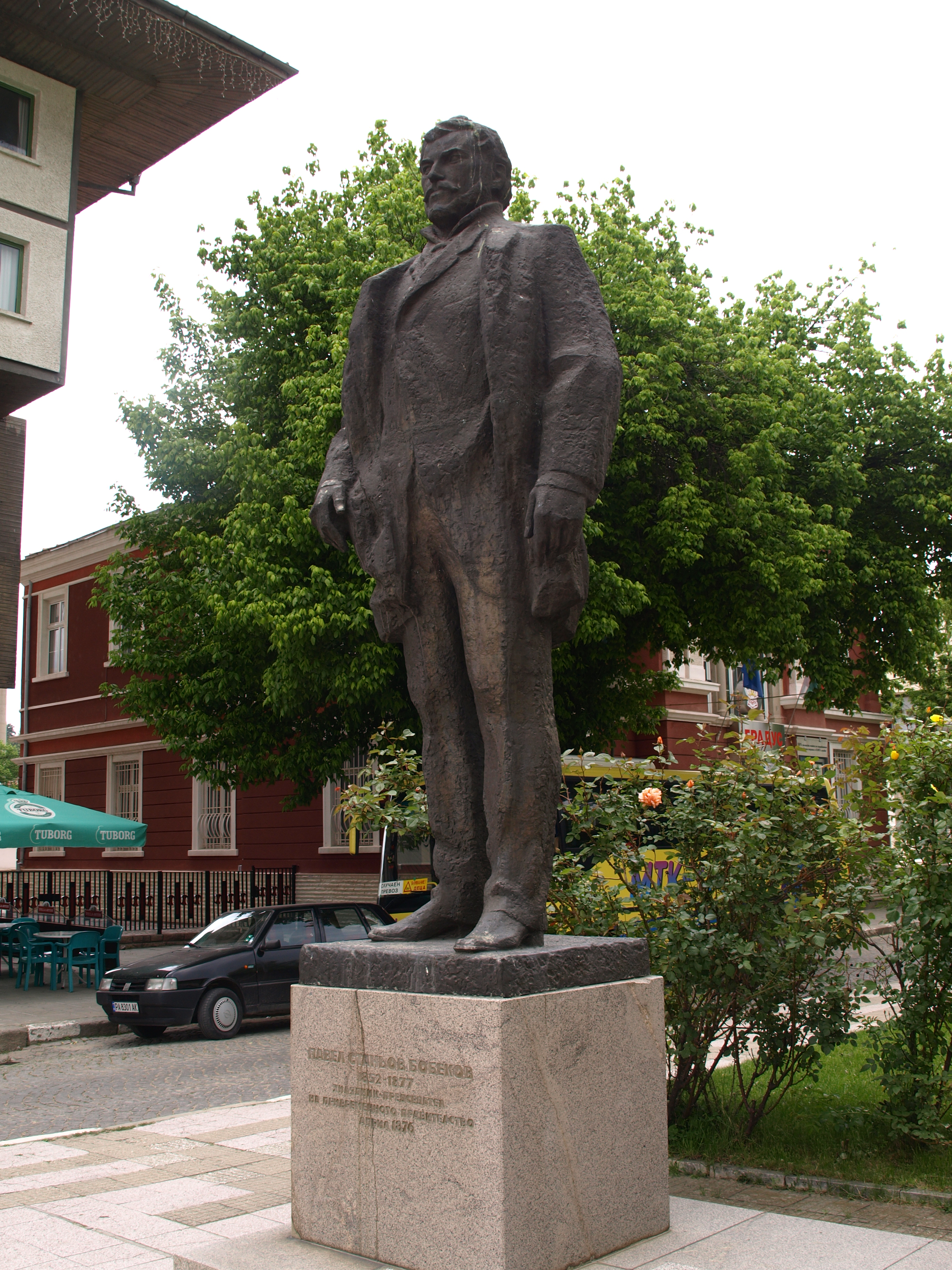
Statue of Pavel Bobekov

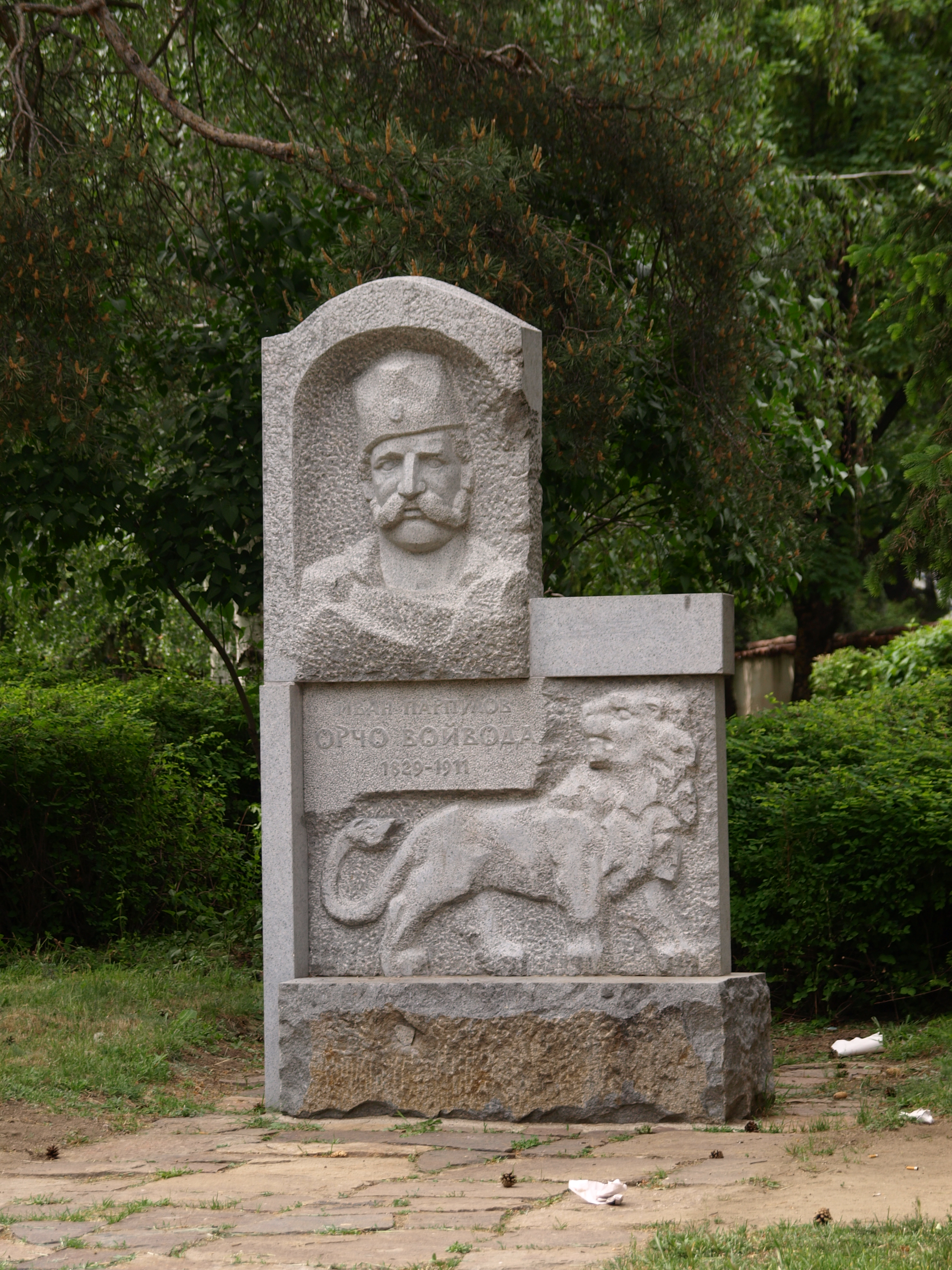
Statue of Orcho Voivode
