= Panagyurski kolonii =

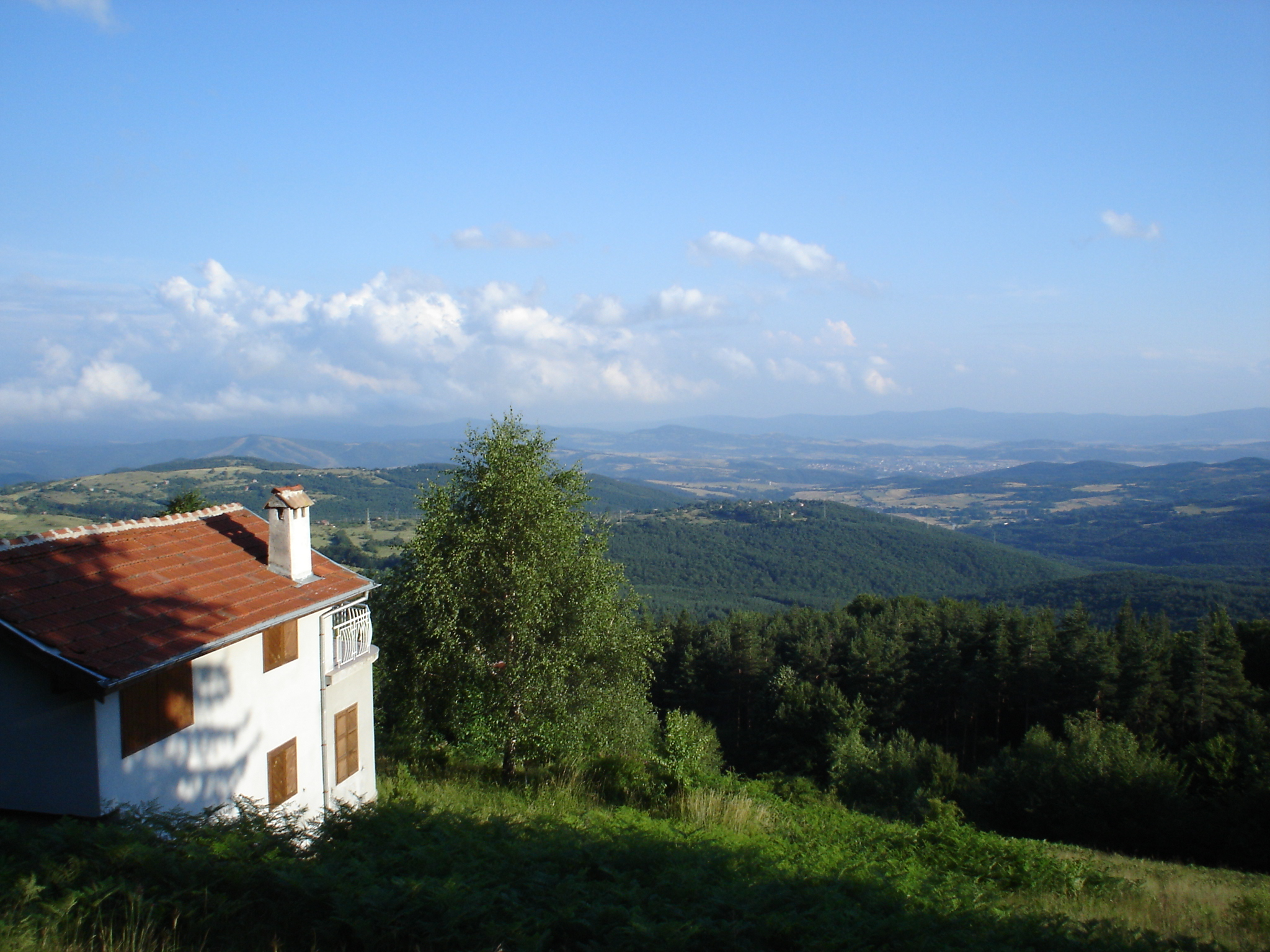
- View towards Panagyurishte.

- Location of Panagyurski kolonii
- Coordinates: 42°35′N 24°12′E
- Country: Bulgaria
- Provinces (Oblast): Pazardzhik

Government
  - Mayor: Petko Stoev
- Elevation: 1,050 m (3,440 ft)

Population (13 September 2005)
  - Total: 372
- Time zone: UTC+2 (EET)
  - Summer (DST): UTC+3 (EEST)
- Postal Code: 4520
- Area code: 03537

Panagyurski kolonii (Bulgarian: Панагюрски колонии) is a popular mountain resort with a village status situated 1050 m. above sea level in the Sredna Gora Mountain about 15 km. north of the town of Panagyurishte, Bulgaria.

It is typical with its numerous family-owned summer houses built mainly in the 1930s. The houses are designed to be inhabited in the summer months and remain closed in the cold months of the year. There is also a tourist hostel, a few restaurants and cafes and a ski run. A church has been recently restored. The name of the resort literally means "the colonies of Panagyurishte", because it was grounded as a summer recreational area for the children of the nearby town. The summer houses, however, belong to people from all over Bulgaria.

The area around the resort is characterized by dense century-old beech woods broken by mountain meadows. Wildlife includes deer, wild boar and foxes.
