= Popintsi =

Popintsi Попинци
- Village
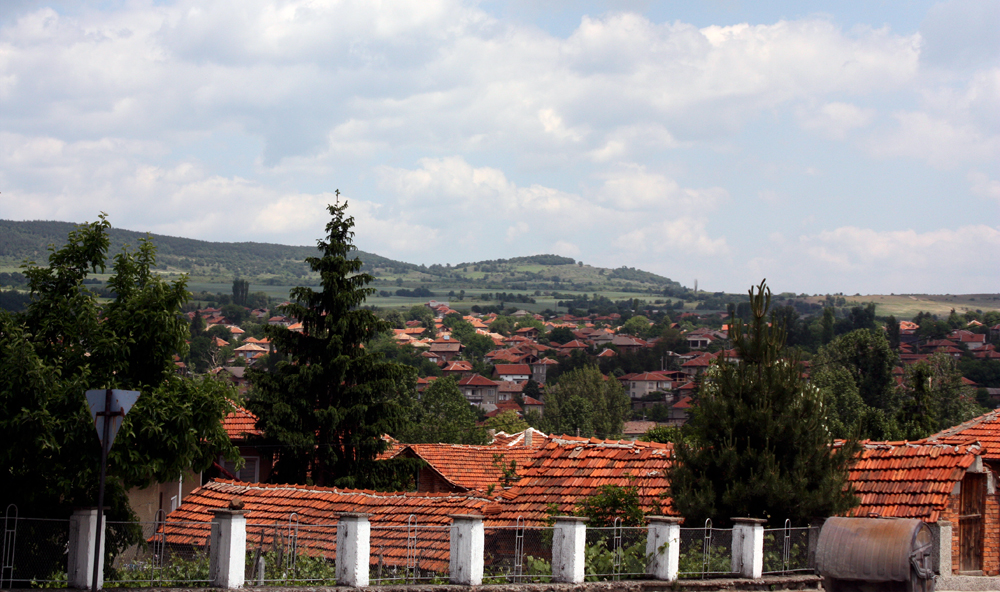
- Roadside view of Popintsi

- Location in Bulgaria
- Coordinates: 42.417°N 24.283°E
- Country: Bulgaria
- Province: Pazardzhik
- Municipality: Panagyurishte

Government
  - Mayor: Nona Zagorska (BANU)

Area
  - Total: 48.046 km^{2} (18.551 sq mi)
- Elevation: 350 m (1,150 ft)

Population (2015)
  - Total: 1,815
- Postal code: 4528
- Area code: 03534
- Vehicle registration: РА

Popintsi (Bulgarian: Попинци) is a village in southern Bulgaria, part of Panagyurishte municipality, Pazardzhik Province. It is located 17 km south of Panagyurishte and 26 km north of Pazardzhik, on both banks of the Luda Yana River. As of September 2005 the population is 2,383.

The village lies at 407 m above sea level at the foot of the Sredna Gora mountain range, at 42°25′N 24°17′E.

== Geography ==
The village is situated in the Sredna Gora plains, and is around 20 km. from Panagyurishte. It is near the river Luda Yana.

Some of the villagers call the village "The Spigot" (Bulgarian: Чучура), while others simply call it "The Village" (Bulgarian: Селото). The village is known as being very hospitable. An area named Petelovo is located near the village—large amounts of gold and other precious metals have been found there before.

== History ==
The exact date of the village's establishment is unknown, but it is known that it was inhabited at the time of the Thracians. This is backed by a large amount of archeological items in the local areas Popinsko Kale, Obrochishte, Sveti Nikola, Sveta Petka, Gospodova Cherkva, Borova Mogila, Poleto, and Tsonina Chukara. Above 25 burial mounds, a votive plate to the Thracian leader Heros, ceramic items, were found, which shows proof of a functioning settlement and a forgotten and misunderstood history. It is thought that the settlement fell under Ottoman rule in 1393, at which time the Bulgarian kingdom (under Ivan Shishman) was falling into Ottoman hands.

Popintsi is an old Bulgarian village, created near the Middle Ages. Information about the village under the names Popinche and Popinich is contained within Ottoman registers from 1489 and 1530.

The village traditions have stayed alive for centuries, passed from generation to generation.

During recent years, a new tradition has emerged—from 1977 onwards, every three years, a large festival is held in the village, with participants from the entire country. The community center "Iskra," established in 1872, plays a large role in keeping the cultural traditions in the village alive. Groups in the center revive and recreate the Popintsi culture, not only for the local public, but for the country, and have won many awards.

Near the historic fort "Gradishteto," even today, the remnants of an ancient chapel can be found, which shows the presence of the Eastern Orthodox Church in Popintsi even from ancient times. The current church was built in 1848, and its bells still are rung in the village on holidays.

During Ottoman rule, the village did not accept Turks at all, despite their hospitability. There is a tale, that one night, two Turks decide to "visit" in a house in Popintsi. They demand that the family in the house prepares a large amount of food for them: bread, banitsa, and many other things. At that time, the mother, daughter and boy were present in the house—the father was not present. Suddenly, the Turks begin to eye the daughter, and the intelligent mother tells the girl to get the father, while giving them copious amounts of wine and rakia, and they soon become drunk. The father then came and quickly slaughtered the Turks. They buried the bodies in the house—as during that time, the village huts had only dirt floors—and covered them with clay. The victims' fellow Turks then came to try to locate their friends and were unable to. From then on, Turks no longer "visited" the village.
