= Ihtiman Municipality =

Coordinates: 42°25′59″N 23°49′1″E

Ihtiman Municipality Община Ихтиман
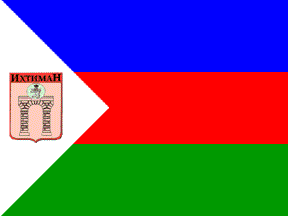
- Flag

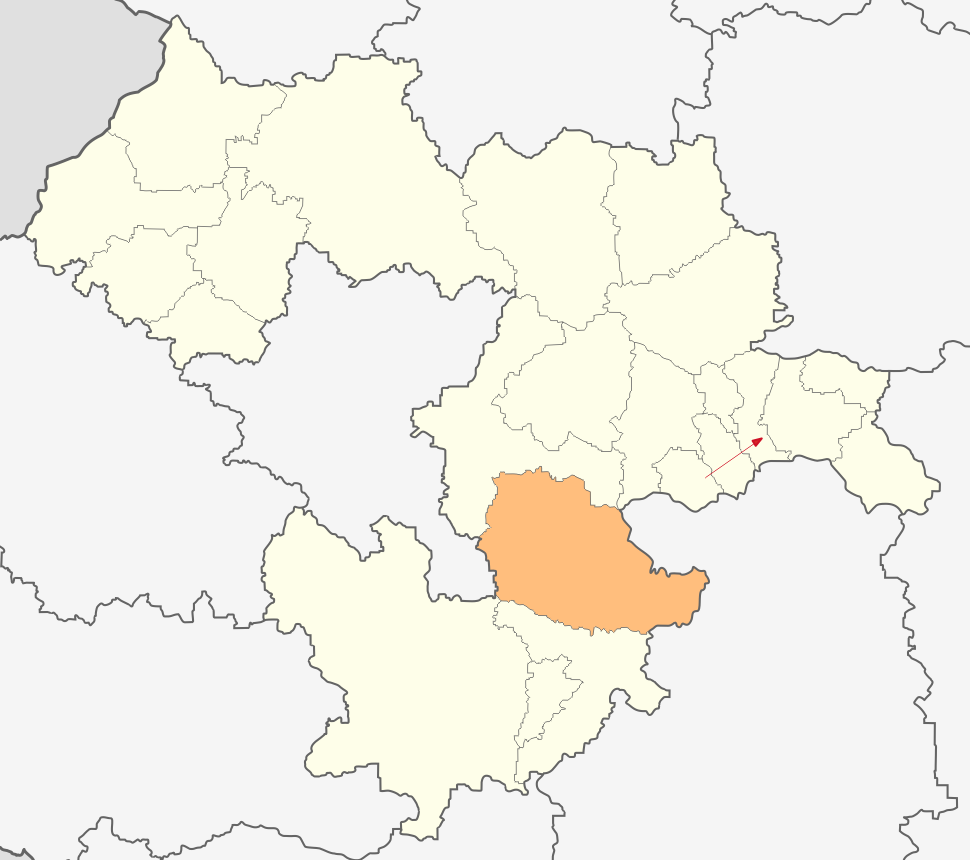
- Country: Bulgaria
- Province: Sofia Province
- Seat: Ihtiman

Area
  - Total: 541.8 km^{2} (209.2 sq mi)

Population (2024)
  - Total: 16,924
  - Density: 31.24/km^{2} (80.90/sq mi)
- Website: ihtiman.bg

Ihtiman Municipality (Bulgarian: Община Ихтиман) is a municipality in Sofia Province, western Bulgaria. Covering a territory of 541.8 km^{2}, it is the third largest of the 22 municipalities in the province and takes 7.65% of its total area.

== Geography ==
The relief of the municipality is varied. In its center is the entire territory of the Ihtiman Valley, enclosed from all sides by the ridges of the Sredna Gora mountain range. The highest point of the municipality is the summit of Trana (1,276 m). Ihtiman Municipality falls within the humid continental climate zone. In the easternmost reaches flows a section of the river Topolnitsa of the Maritsa drainage. About three quarters of the municipality is drained by the Mativir, a right tributary of the Topolnitsa, which flows entirely within its borders. The southern portion of the Topolnitsa Reservoir and its dam are located in Ihtiman Municipality.

== Transport ==
Ihtiman Municipality is traversed by six roads of the national network with a total length of 131.8 km, including a 30.6 km section of the Trakiya motorway (A1), a 31.9 km stretch of the first class I-8 road Kalotina–Sofia–Plovdiv–Kapitan Andreevo, the first 24.9 km of the third class III-801 road, the first 22.8 km of the third class III-803 road, the last 14.2 km section of the third class III-822 road, and the whole 7.4 km length of the third class III-8223 road.

It is also traversed by a 32.3 km section of railway line No. 1 Kalotina–Sofia–Plovdiv–Kapitan Andreevo, and the first 6.1 km of the railway between Vakarel and Garba.

== Demography ==
Historical population
Year	Pop.	±%
1934	22,315	—
1946	23,344	+4.6%
1956	24,819	+6.3%
1965	21,063	−15.1%
1975	20,738	−1.5%
1985	20,218	−2.5%
1992	19,074	−5.7%
2001	19,303	+1.2%
2011	17,720	−8.2%
2021	17,397	−1.8%
Source: National Statistics Institute

As of 2024 the population of Ihtiman Municipality is 16,924, living in one town and 27 villages:

- Balyovtsi
- Banchovtsi
- Belitsa
- Bogdanovtsi
- Boeritsa
- Borika
- Buzyakovtsi
- Bardo
- Vakarel
- Venkovets
- Verinsko
- Dzhamuzovtsi
- Zhivkovo
- Ihtiman
- Kostadinkino
- Lyubnitsa
- Mechkovtsi
- Mirovo
- Muhovo
- Neykyovets
- Panovtsi
- Paunovo
- Polyantsi
- Popovtsi
- Razhana
- Selyanin
- Stambolovo
- Chernyovo

== Gallery ==
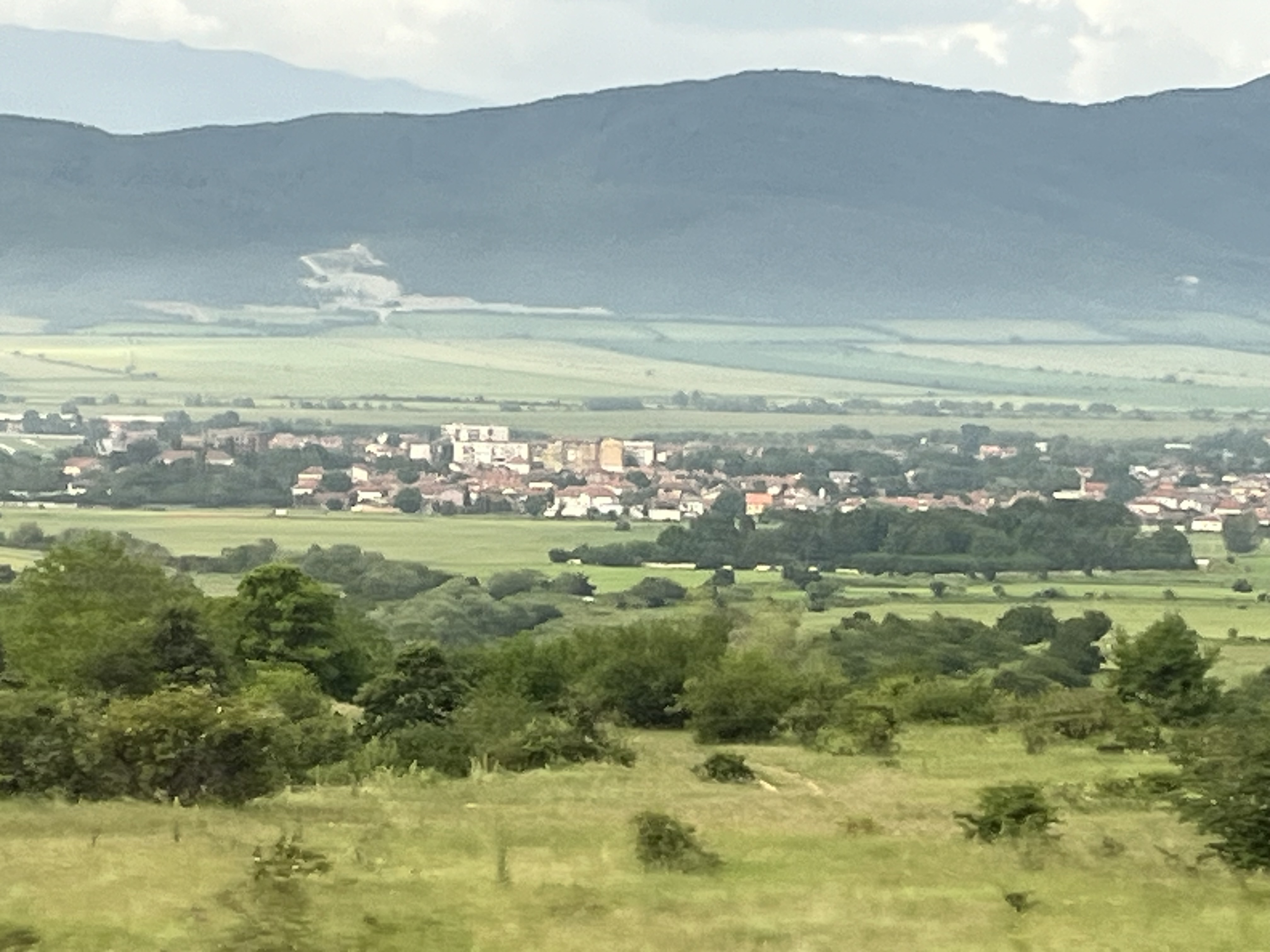
Ihtiman Valley

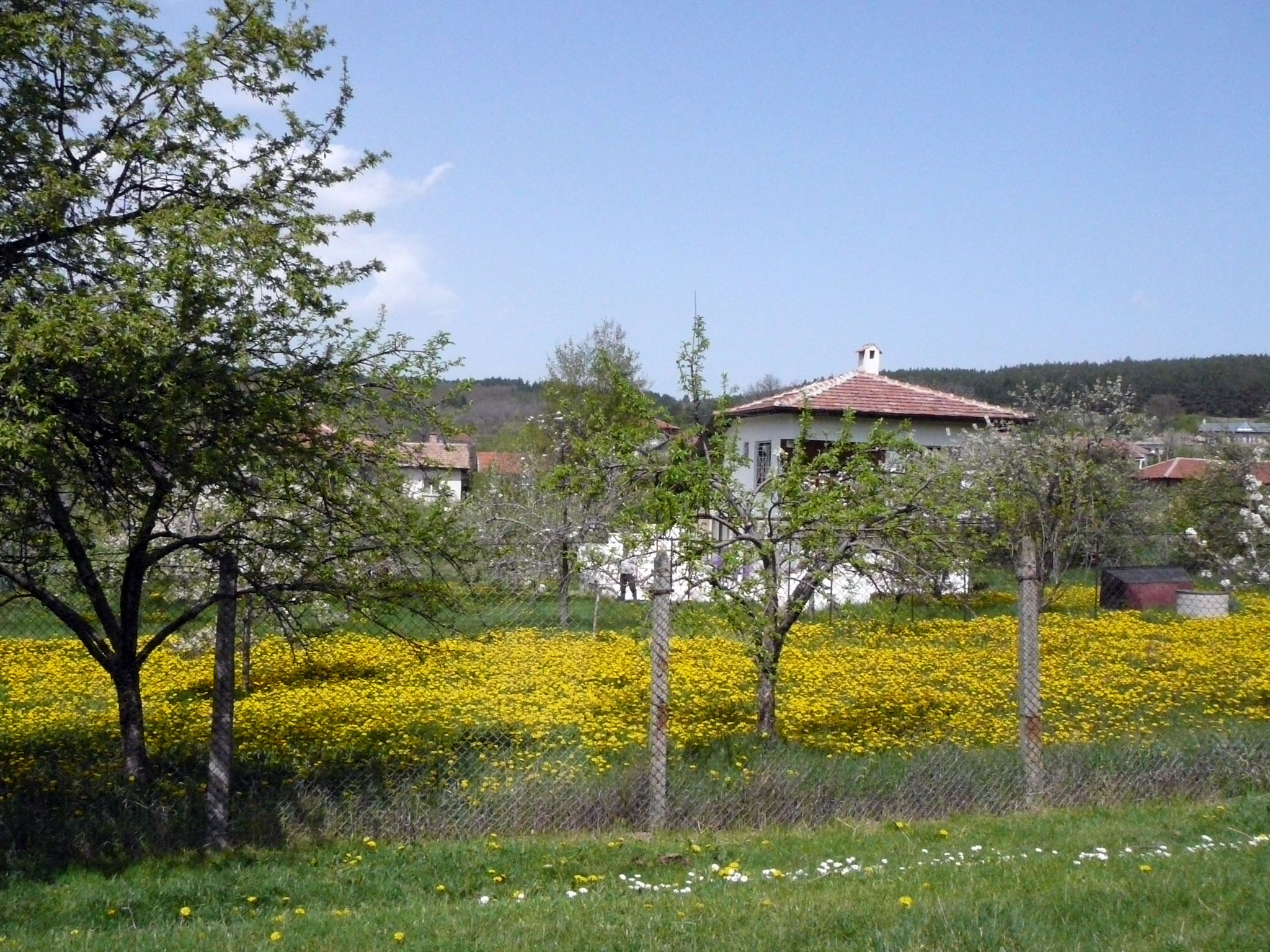
Borika

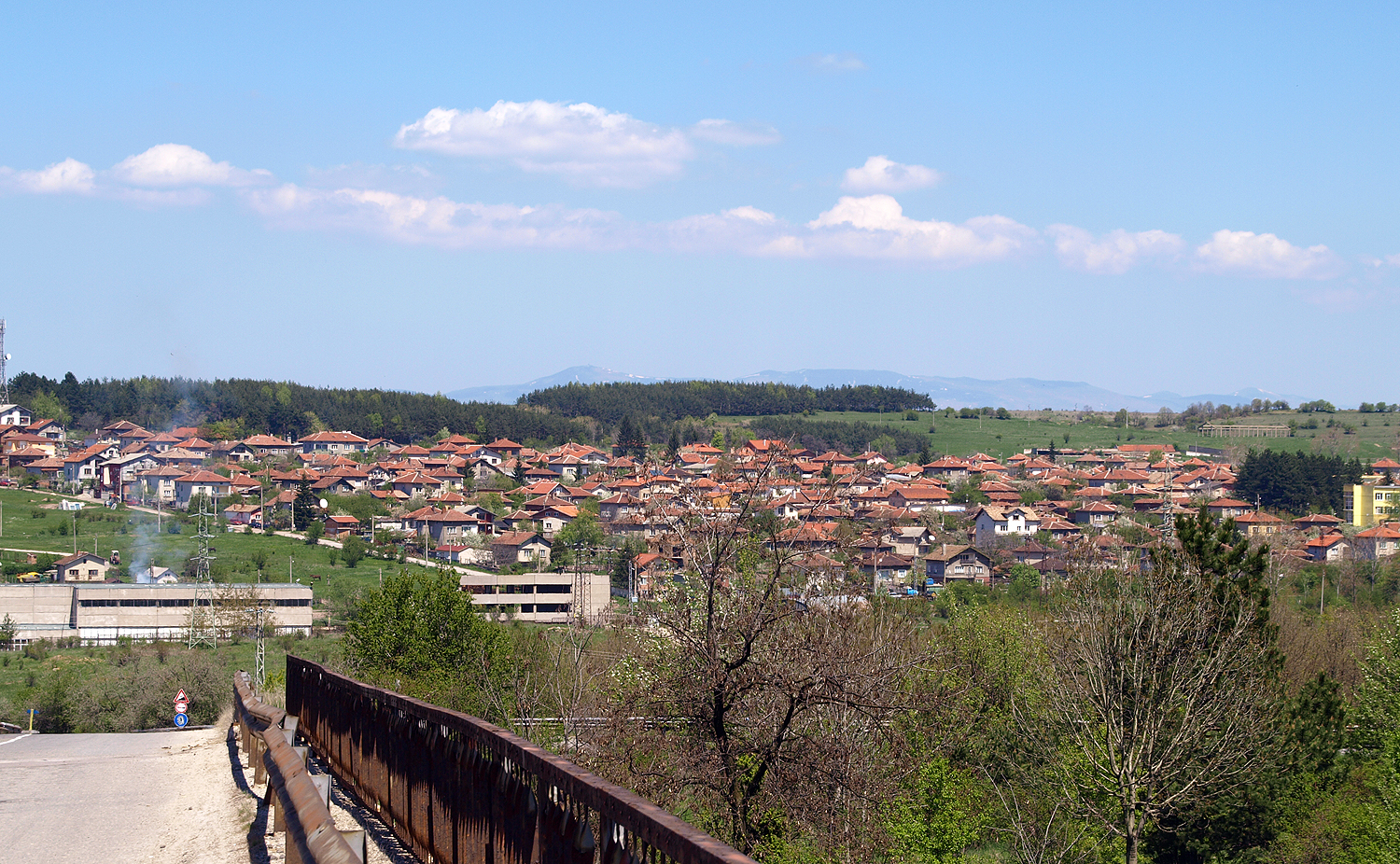
Vakarel

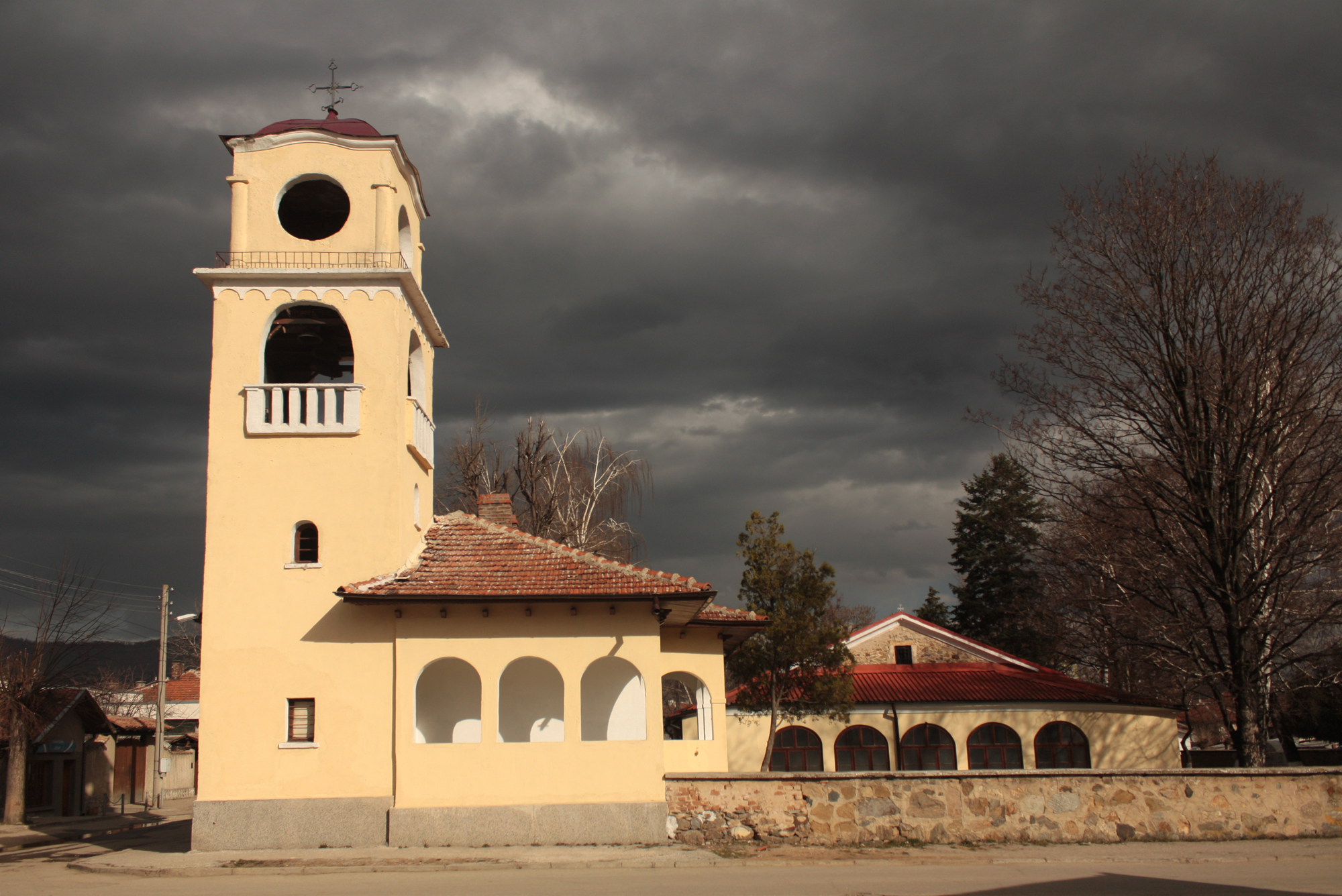
A church in Ihtiman
