= Muhovo, Sofia Province =

Muhovo Мухово
- Village
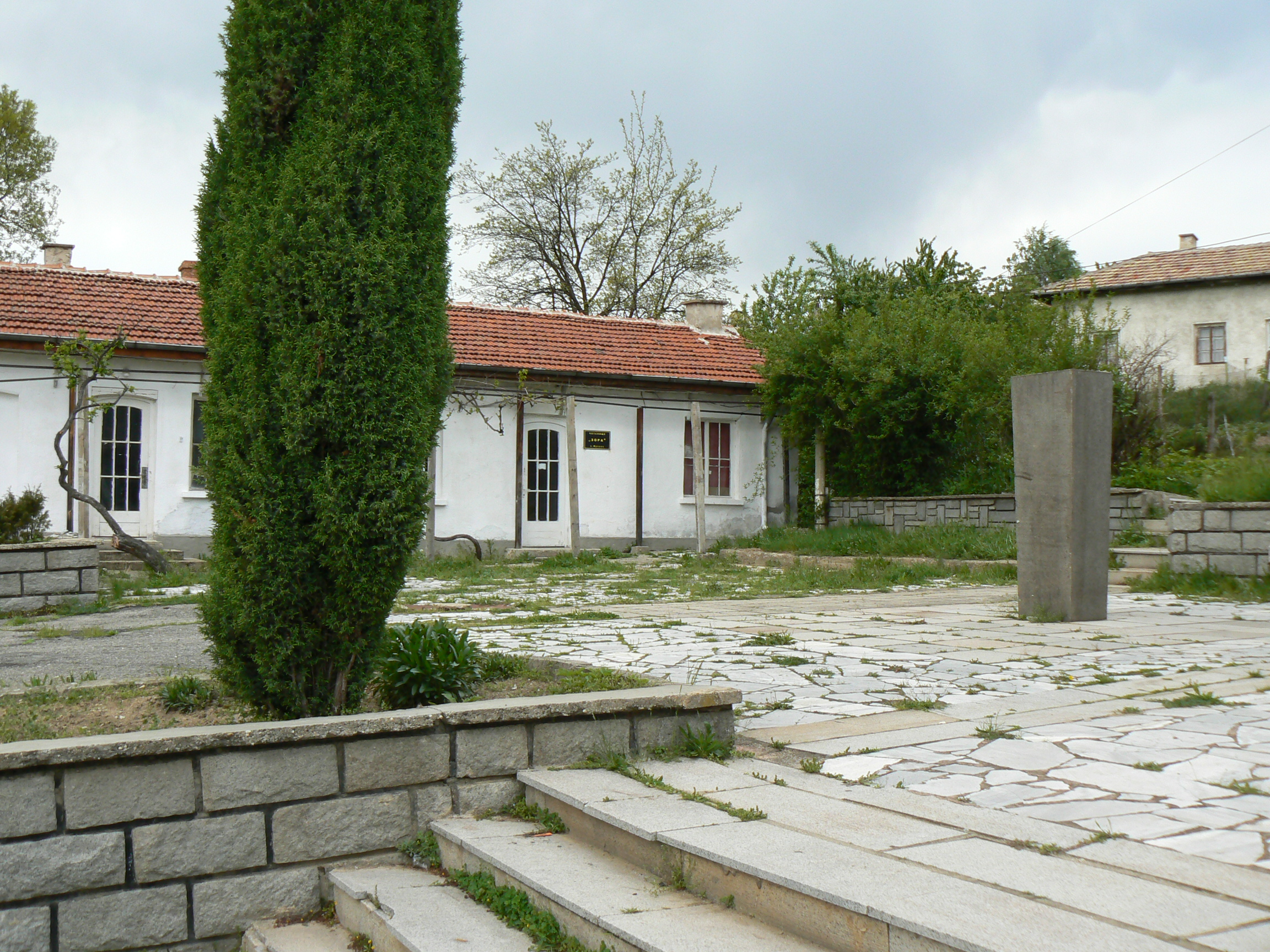

- Location of Muhovo
- Coordinates: 42°25′N 23°59′E
- Country: Bulgaria
- Provinces (Oblast): Sofia Province

Government
  - Mayor: Margarita Petkova (Mayor of Ihtiman)

Area
  - Total: 83.723 km^{2} (32.326 sq mi)
- Elevation: 436 m (1,430 ft)

Population (2007-01-01)
  - Total: 138
  - Density: 1.65/km^{2} (4.27/sq mi)
- Time zone: UTC+2 (EET)
  - Summer (DST): UTC+3 (EEST)
- Postal Code: 2061

Muhovo (Bulgarian: Мухово) is a village in Ihtiman Municipality in Sofia Province, western Bulgaria with a population of 138.

== Geography ==
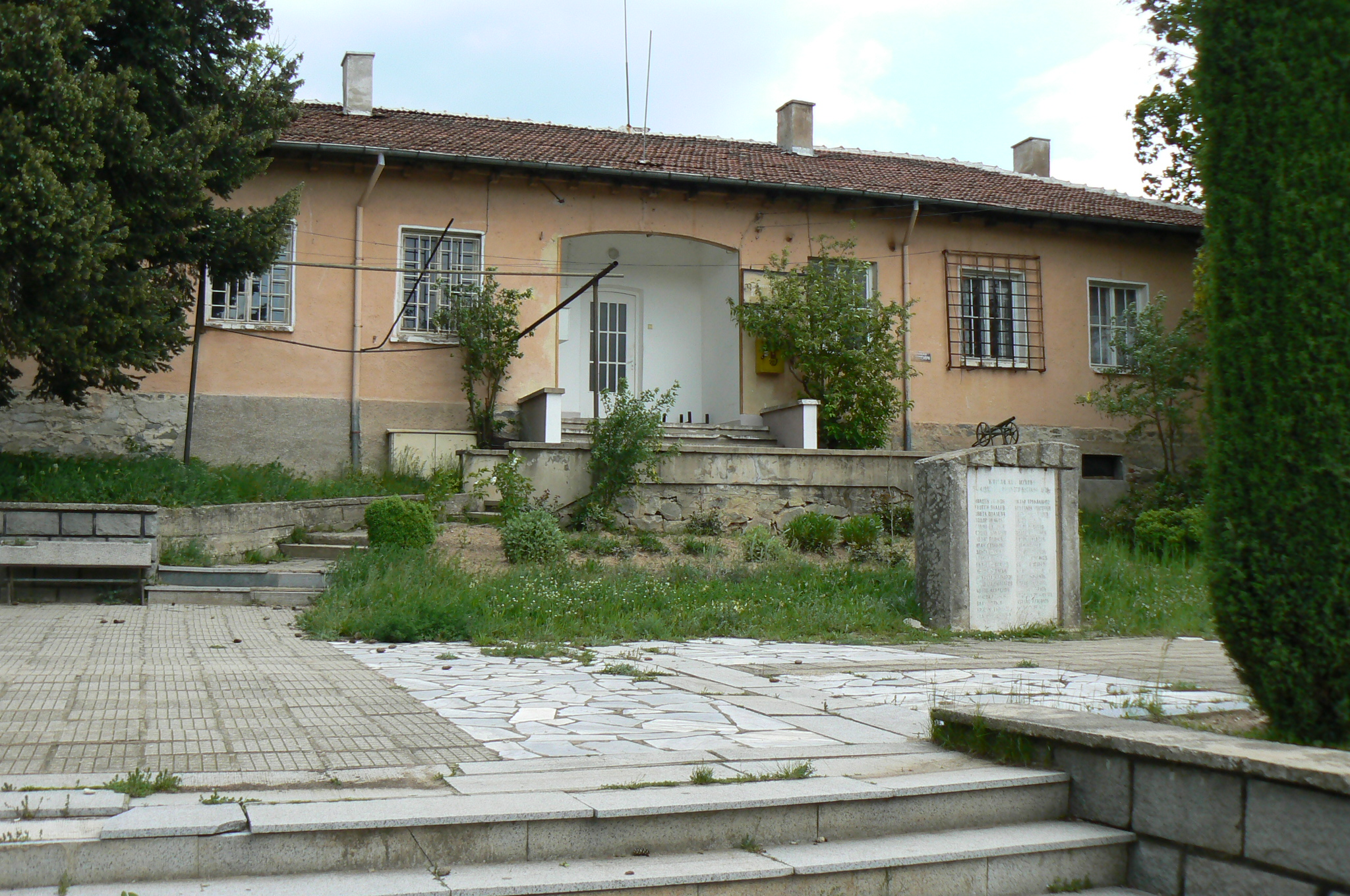
The Mayor's office and the soldiers' monument in Muhovo.

The village is located in the mountain of Sredna Gora, on the southern edge of the Topolnitsa Reservoir, at 22 km to the east of Ihtiman. Muhovo is in the vicinity of the villages of Lesichovo and Tserovo. The surrounding region has a soft microclimate due to the reservoir and the southern slopes of the mountain. There are 280 sunny day annually which is above the average for Bulgaria.

== History ==
Before the construction of the dam the village was located on the banks of the Topolnitsa River. During the April Uprising the Flying Band of Georgi Benkovski passed through the villages of Oborishte, Poibrene and Muhovo. In Muhovo over 40 people volunteered to join Benkovski. Many people from the village took part in the September Uprising of 1923.

== Religion ==
Currently a new church named after Saint George is under construction. The old church is now underwater in the reservoir and used to have a large yard and a separate belfry.

== Gallery ==
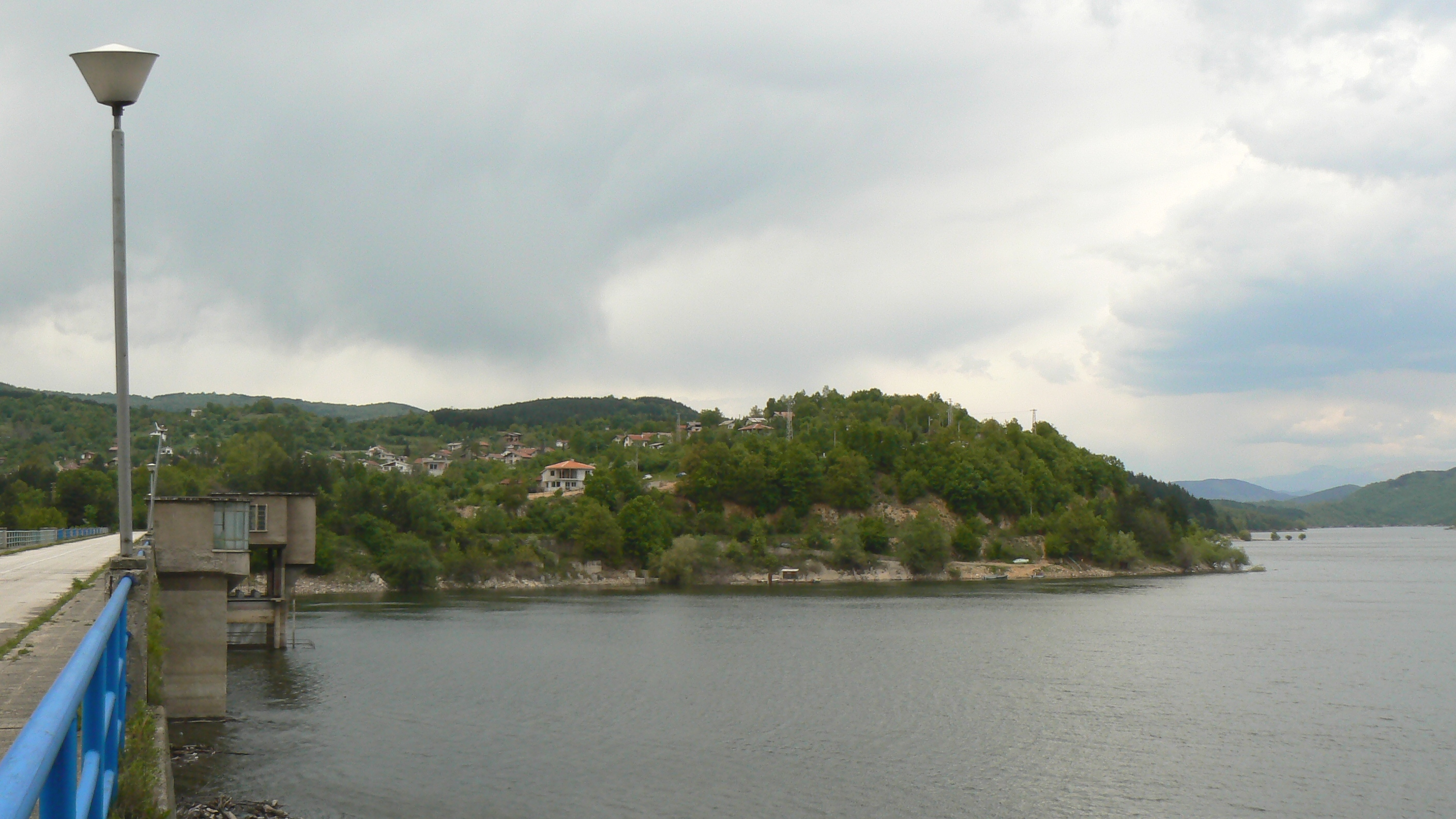
Muhovo and the shore of the Topolnitsa reservoir.

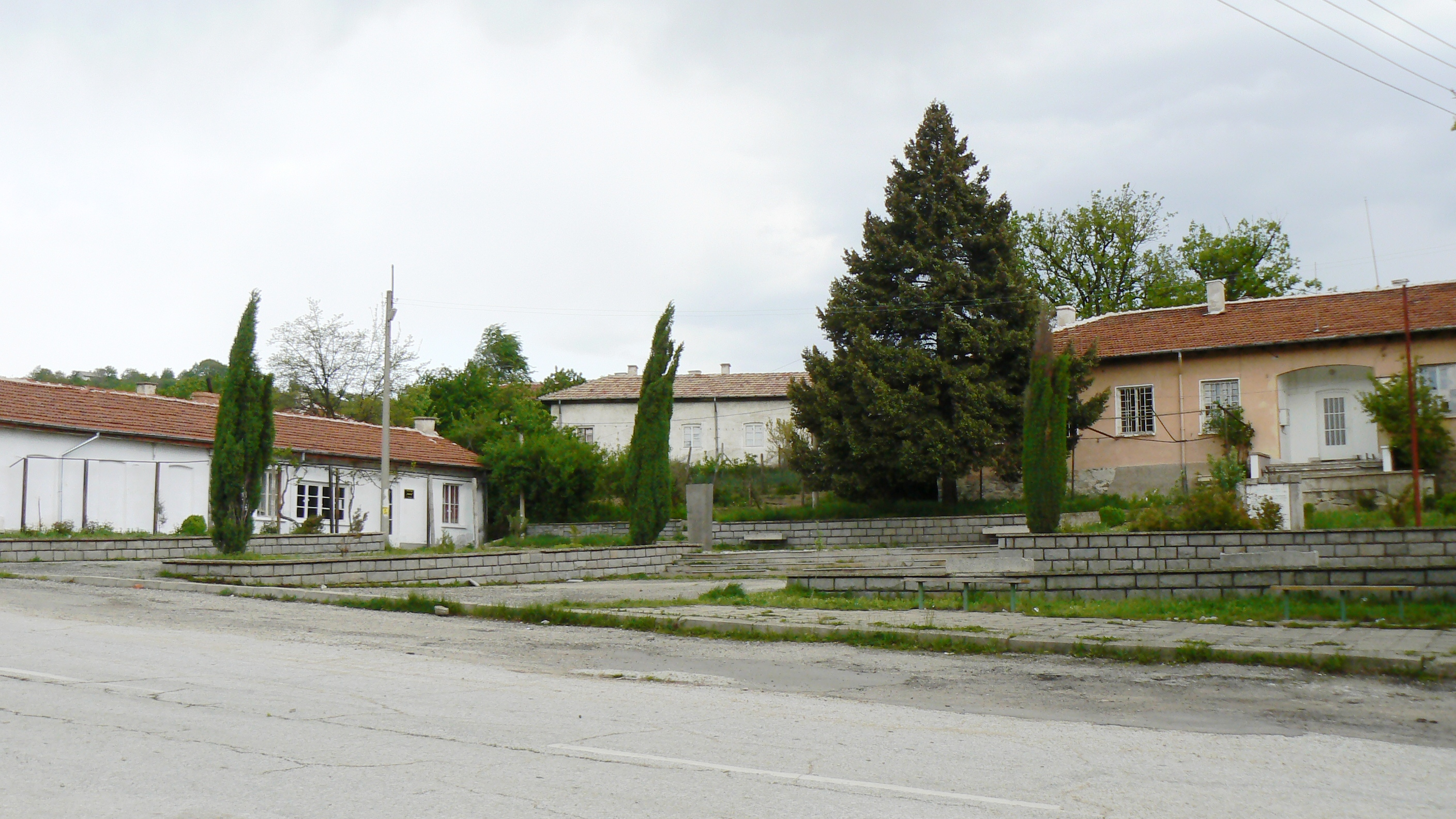
The center of the village.

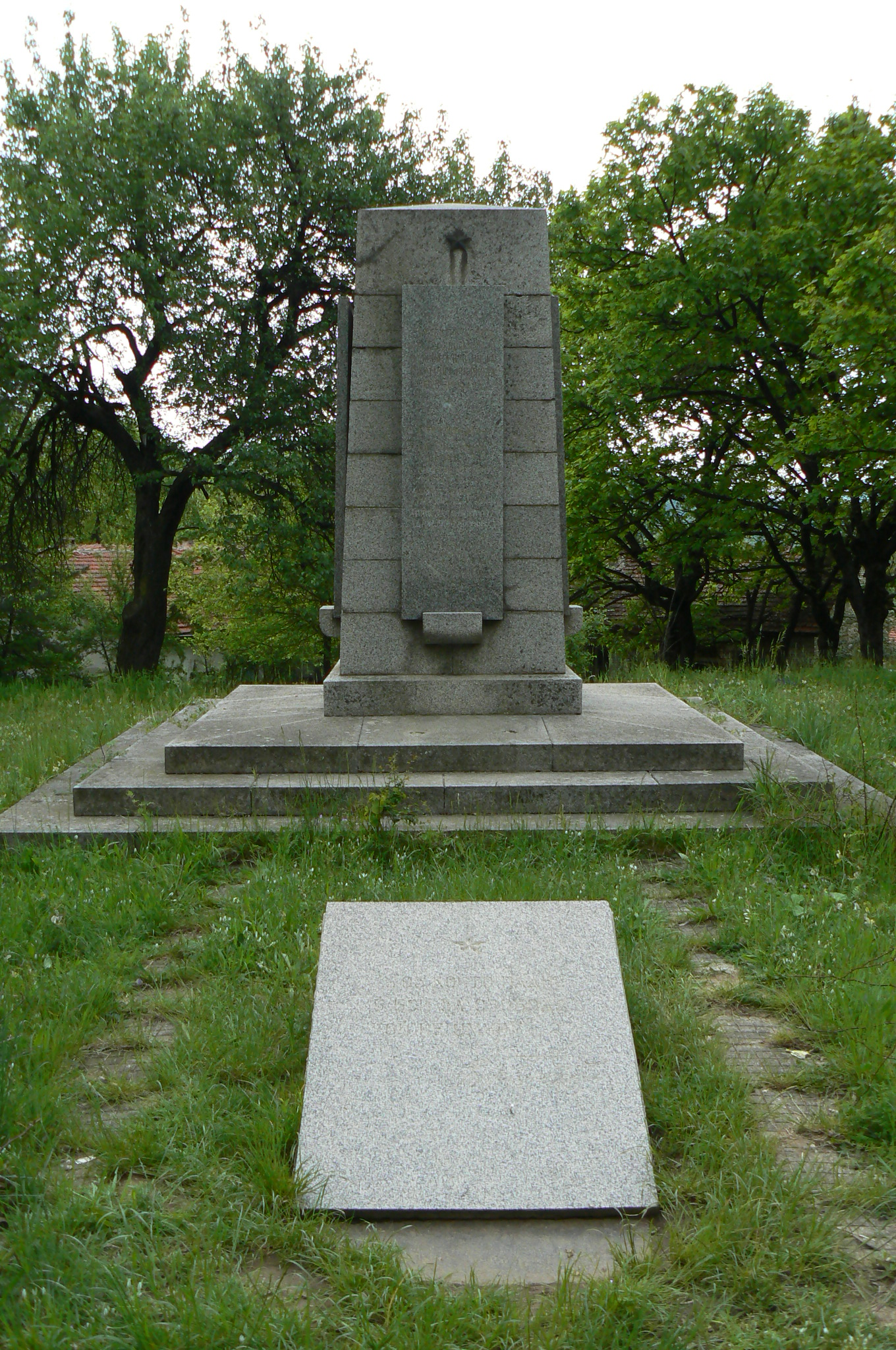
The partisan monument in Muhovo.

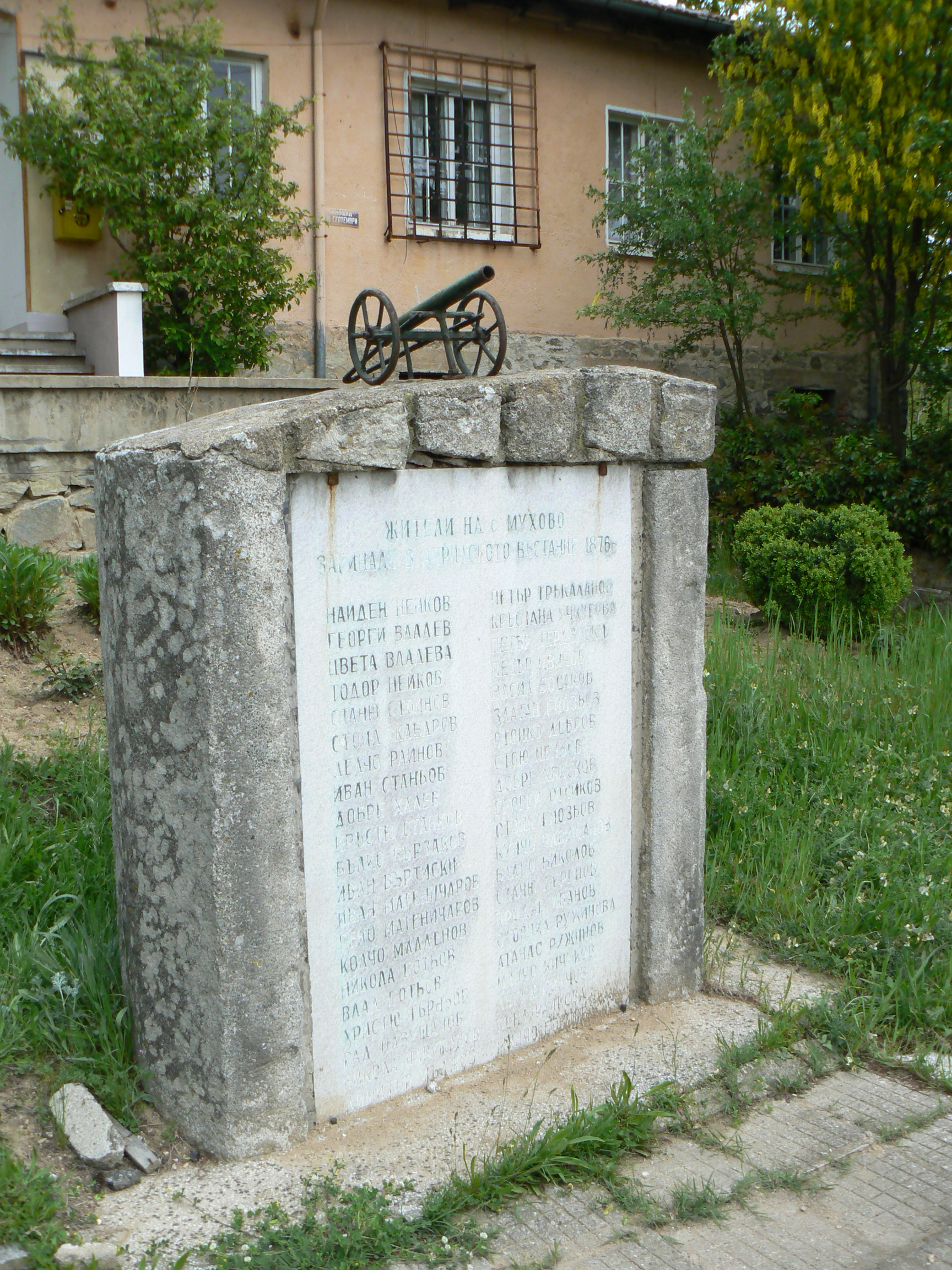
The monument to the fallen in the wars in the village.
