= Ihtiman Valley =

Valley in Bulgaria

- Valley
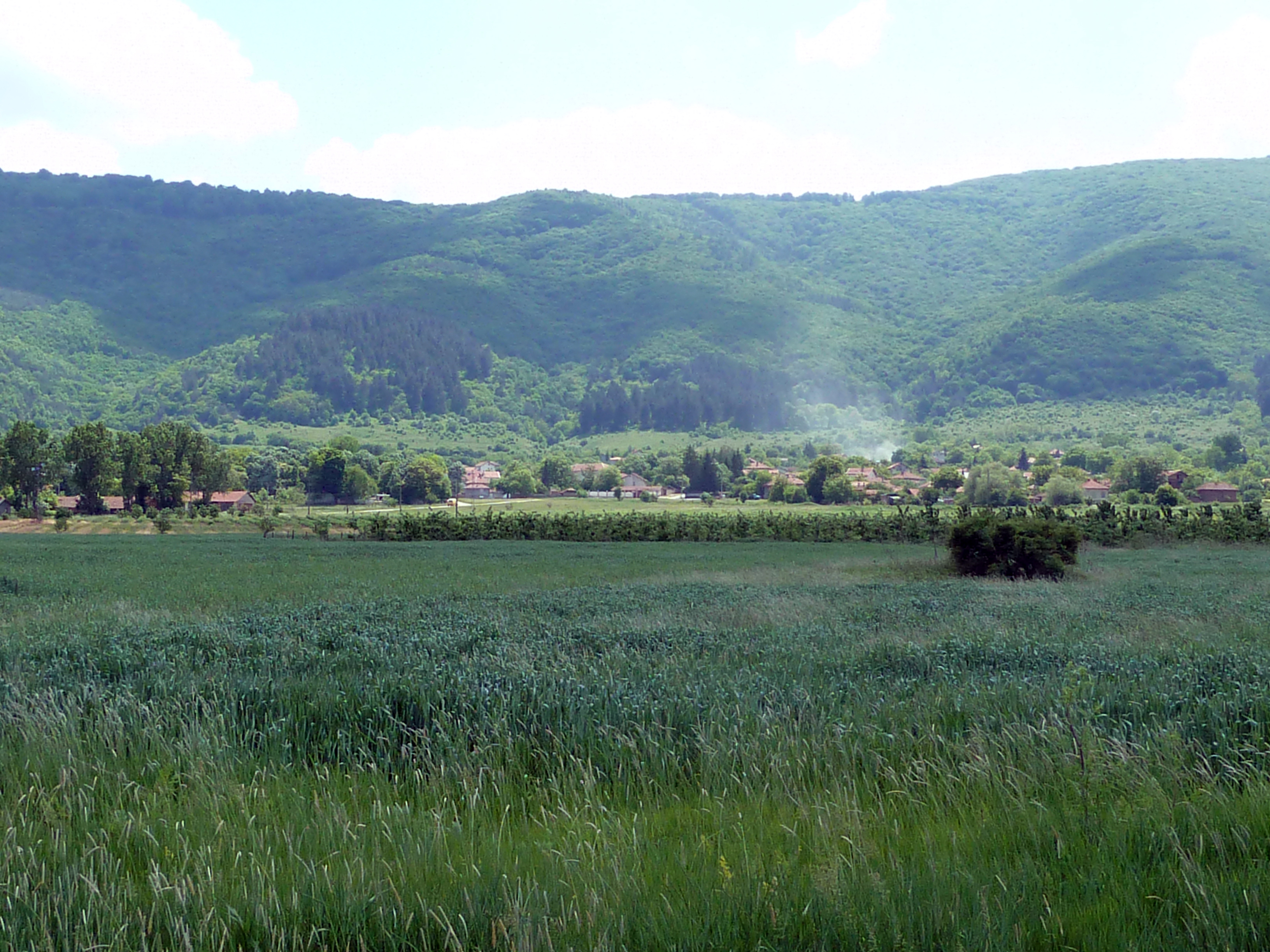
- The valley at the village of Chernyovo
- Interactive map of Ihtiman Valley
- Coordinates: 42°26′14″N 23°48′58″E
- Location: Bulgaria

Area
  - Total: 106 km^{2} (41 sq mi)

Dimensions
  - Length: 16 km (9.9 mi)
  - Width: 10 km (6.2 mi)

Ihtiman Valley (Bulgarian: Ихтиманска котловина) is situated in western Bulgaria. It is named after its main settlement, the town of Ihtiman.

== Geography ==
The valley has the shape of an isosceles triangle, turned with its apex to the southeast. It has a length of 16 km and a width of up to 10 km. It spans a territory of 106 km^{2} with an altitude of 620–700 m. It is situated in the center of the Ihtimanska Sredna Gora, the western part of the Sredna Gora mountain range. The Ihtiman valley is enclosed between the Vakarel Mountain to the northwest and the ridges of Belitsa to the northeast, Vetren to the southeast, and Septemvriyski to the south–southwest. The latter separates it from the Kostenets–Dolna Banya Valley to the south.

The slopes of the Ihtiman Valley have uneven gradient and size, ranging from longer and oblique at the Vakarel Mountain, to steep Septemvriyski ridge. Its center is an extensive flat accumulative field. The slopes are built up of gneiss, granite, sandstone and conglomerates, while the foundation is composed of Neogene–Quaternary sediments. The valley was formed as a result of tectonic subsidence at the end of the Upper Pliocene and the Quaternary.

The climate is temperate continental with frequent temperature inversions and mists in winter. The average annual temperature is 9.1 °C, with an average of -2.3 °C in January and 19.5 °C in July. The mean annual precipitation is 548 mm. It is drained by the river Mativir, a right tributary of the Topolnitsa of the Maritsa river basin. The soils are mainly chernozem and alluvial.

== Settlements, transportation and economy ==
Administratively, it falls in Sofia Province on the territory of Ihtiman Municipality. Apart from the town of Ihtiman, there are eight villages — Boeritsa, Venkovets, Verinsko, Zhivkovo, Mirovo, Polyantsi, Stambolovo and Chernyovo.

The valley is served by several roads of the national network, as well as local roads. Its eastern reaches are traversed by a 11.9 km stretch Trakia motorway in direction northwest–southeast. Parallel to the motorway runs a 16.3 km section of the first class I-8 road Kalotina–Sofia–Plovdiv–Kapitan Andreevo, both of them part of the strategic European route E80. In direction west–east is located a 12.2 km stretch of the third class III-822 road Samokov–Novo Selo–Ihtiman. The center of the valley is traversed by railway line No. 1 Kalotina–Sofia–Plovdiv–Svilengrad served by the Bulgarian State Railways.

The climatic and soil conditions of the Ihtiman Valley are favourable for agriculture, mainly cereals and potatoes, as well as animal husbandry. In Ihtiman there is metallurgic, machine building and textile industry. The oldest golf course in Bulgaria is situated in the valley.

== Sources ==
- Мичев (Michev), Николай (Nikolay); Михайлов (Mihaylov), Цветко (Tsvetko); Вапцаров (Vaptsarov), Иван (Ivan); Кираджиев (Kiradzhiev), Светлин (Svetlin) (1980). Географски речник на България [Geographic Dictionary of Bulgaria] (in Bulgarian). София (Sofia): Наука и култура (Nauka i kultura).
