= Oborishte =

Oborishte Оборище
- Village
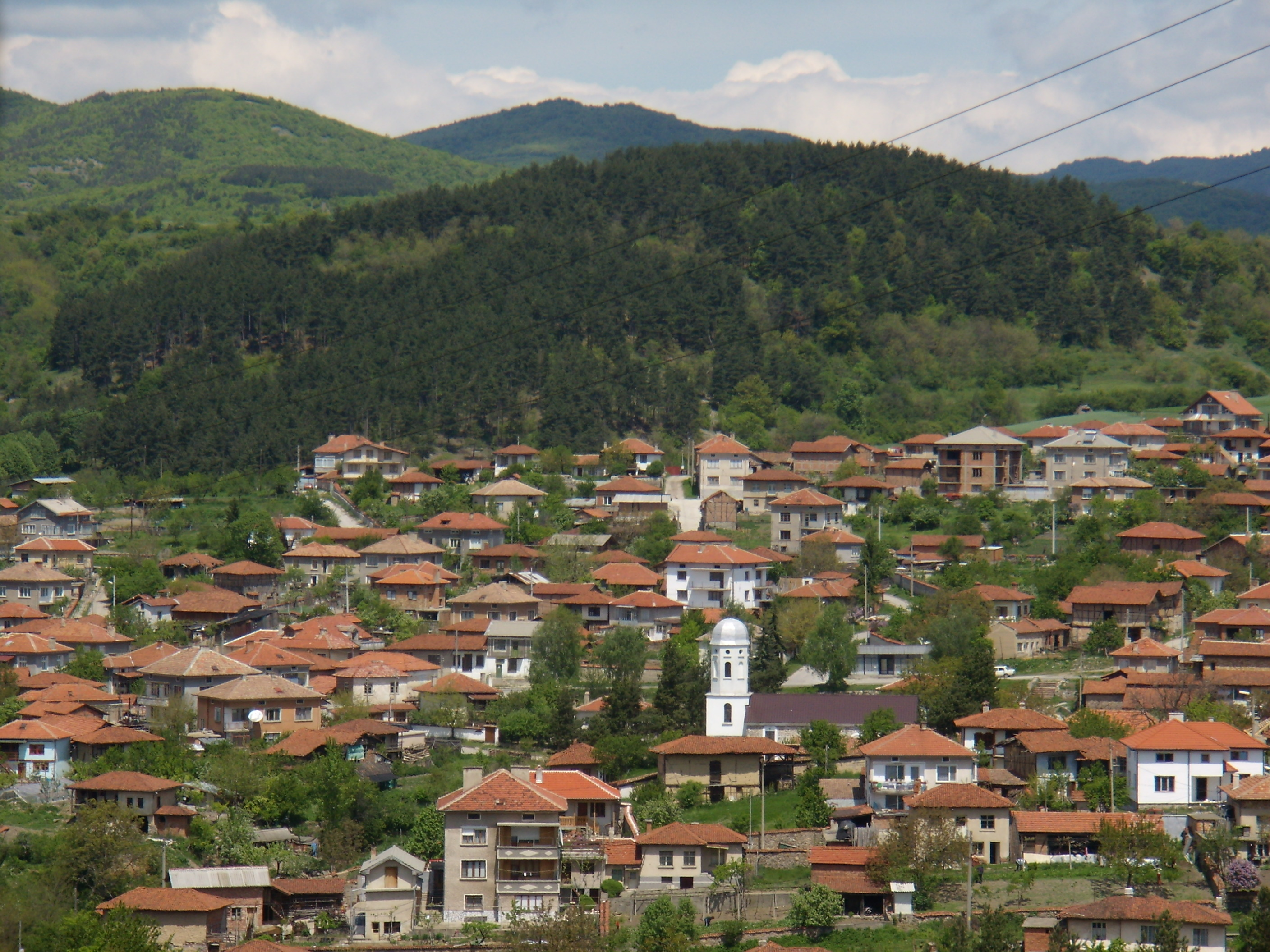

- Location of Oborishte
- Coordinates: 42°30′N 24°04′E
- Country: Bulgaria
- Provinces (Oblast): Pazardzhik Province

Government
  - Mayor: Milko Angelov (GERB)

Area
  - Total: 69.059 km^{2} (26.664 sq mi)
- Elevation: 660 m (2,170 ft)

Population (2007-01-01)
  - Total: 1,307
  - Density: 18.93/km^{2} (49.02/sq mi)
- Time zone: UTC+2 (EET)
  - Summer (DST): UTC+3 (EEST)
- Postal Code: 4522

Oborishte (Bulgarian: Оборище) is a village located in the Panagyurishte municipality, Pazardzhik Province, western Bulgaria. It is relatively large for the region and has 1,307 inhabitants. Its name until 1950 was Mechka (Мечка), which in Bulgarian means "bear".

== Geography ==
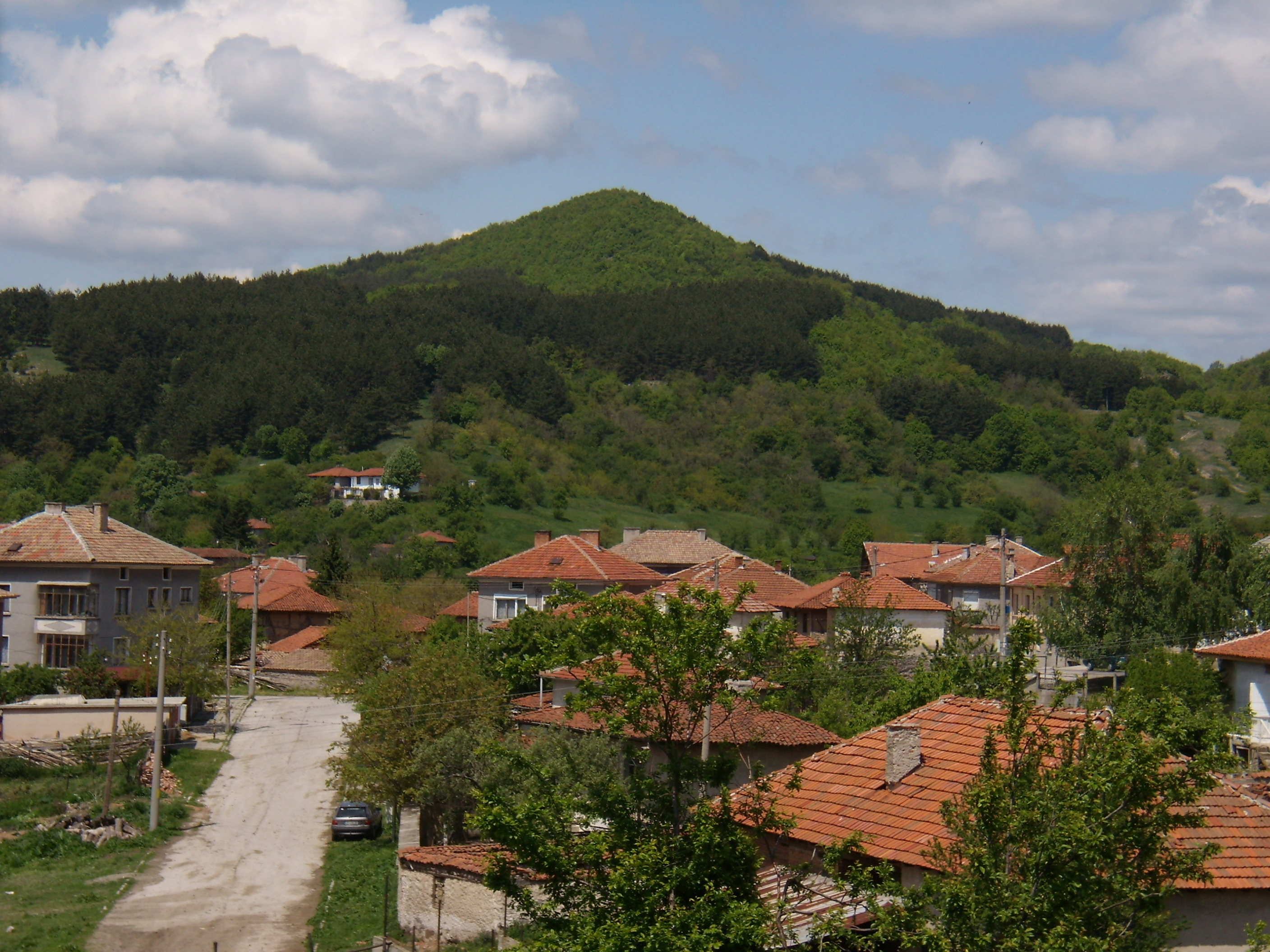
Oborishte.

The village is situated in the mountain of Sredna Gora. The surrounding country is hilly, covered with forests of oak, beech and fir in which mushrooms are particularly abundant in the late summer and autumn. There are several micro dams located to the south and southwest of the village as well as a large dam to the north in which the refuse waters of Asarel Medet are accumulated. The road between Panagyurishte and Vakarel passes through the village. Settlements nearby include the town of Panagyurishte at 9 km to the east and the villages of Poibrene at 9 km to the west and Muhovo at 17 km to the south. The main occupation of the population is agriculture. Barley, rye and plums are among the most common crops to be raised in the surrounding areas. The villagers grow flowers, orchards and vegetables in their gardens. Livestock is by far dominated by goats, pigs and hens. Many locals work in the large copper plant Asarel.

== History ==
The modern name of the village comes from the locality of the same name at 3 km to the east where in April 1876 was held the Grand National Assembly. The decision for the April Uprising was made there. The deputy from Mechka was Dimitar Pavlov. However, there was a traitor among the deputies and the uprising broke out prematurely and was crushed by the Ottoman authorities. Many of the surrounding villages and Panagyurishte were burned to the ground.

== Culture ==
The main landmark is the 19th century church and its renewed bell-tower in which the national hero Vasil Levski had allegedly hidden. There is also a large elementary school. On the central square rises the Town hall and the local Chitalishte (a kind of library) which is among the oldest in the region.

=== Traditions ===
Every year there are celebrations held on 1 and 2 May at the Oborishte locality to commemorate the First Grand National Assembly. The event is attended by people from all over the region but mainly from Panagyurishte. There is a small monument erected on the meadow where the assembly was held with the names of all deputies but the name of the traitor was erased.

The traditional custom Kukeri is performed annually on the main square and is called by the locals Dzhumal (Джумал).
