= Mativir =

Location
- Country: Bulgaria

Physical characteristics
- Source
  - location: western Sredna Gora
  - coordinates: 42°28′57″N 23°38′26.88″E
  - elevation: 963 m (3,159 ft)
- Mouth
  - location: Topolnitsa Reservoir
  - coordinates: 42°27′21.96″N 23°59′26.16″E
  - elevation: 393 m (1,289 ft)
- Length: 61 km (38 mi)
- Basin size: 412 km^{2} (159 sq mi)

Basin features
- Progression: Topolnitsa→ Maritsa

The Mativir (Bulgarian: Мътивир) is a river in southern Bulgaria, a right tributary river Topolnitsa, a left tributary of the Maritsa. Its length is 61 km. The Mativir drains significant areas of the Ihtimanska Sredna Gora mountain range.

== Geography ==
The river takes its source under the name Baba in the western part of the Ihtimanska Sredna Gora at an altitude of 963 m, some 1.3 km west of the village of Borika. In the first 2 km it flows north and then turns eastwards passing through a deep forested valley. At the confluence between the Baba, the Razhana and the Meshkovitsa at 693 m, now under the name Matnitsa, the river turns southeast and after 3 km it enters the Ihtiman Valley. It the valley it flows in a corrected river bed. At 2 km north of the village of Mirovo it turns northeast, exits the valley and enters the Sersemkale Gorge between the ridges of Belitsa to the northwest and Eledzhik to the southeast, both part of Sredna Gora. It flows into the Topolnitsa Reservoir at an altitude of 393 m.

Its drainage basin covers a territory of 412 km^{2} or 23% of the Topolnitsa's total.

The Mativir has predominantly rain-snow feed with high water in March and low water in August. The average annual discharge at Sersemkale Gorge is 1.5 m^{3}/s.

== Settlements and economy ==
The river flows entirely in Sofia Province. There are two settlements along its course, the village of Paunovo and the town of Ihtiman, both in Ihtiman Municipality. The river's waters are utilised for irrigation and industrial water supply in Ihtiman Valley.

There are several important transport corridors along the Mativir valley. These include a 15 km stretch of the Trakia motorway and a 16 km section of the first class I-8 road Kalotina–Sofia–Plovdiv–Kapitan Andreevo, both part of the European route E80. There is also a 6 km stretch of the third class III-803 road Ihtiman–Lesichovo–Pazardzhik through the Sersemkale Gorge.

Between the confluence of the Baba, the Razhana and the Meshkovitsa and the village of Mirovo a section of the Bulgarian State Railways railway line No. 1 Kalotina–Sofia–Plovdiv–Svilengrad follows the Mativir valley.
