= Belitsa, Sofia Province =

Belitsa Белица
- Village
- Location of Belitsa
- Coordinates: 42°30′38″N 23°53′23″E
- Country: Bulgaria
- Province (Oblast): Sofia Province
- Municipality: Ihtiman

Government
  - Mayor: Margarita Petkova (mayor of Ihtiman)

Area
  - Total: 73.353 km^{2} (28.322 sq mi)
- Elevation: 962 m (3,156 ft)
- Time zone: UTC+2 (EET)
  - Summer (DST): UTC+3 (EEST)
- Postal Code: 2062

Belitsa (Bulgarian: Белица) is a village (село) in southwestern Bulgaria, located in the Ihtiman Municipality of the Sofia Province.

Belitsa is placed in the western parts of the Sredna Gora mountain. The village was formed in 2001 with the unification of the villages Sredishtna (Средищна), Suevtsi (Суевци) and Grozdyovtsi (Гроздьовци). It is situated at 13 to the west of Poibrene on one of the roads between the capital Sofia and the town of Panagyurishte.

There is a monument to Vasil Ikonomov in the vicinity of the village.
