= Topolnitsa Reservoir =

Reservoir in Pazardzhik Province, Bulgaria

Topolnitsa Dam

- Location of Topolnitsa Reservoir in Bulgaria
- Official name: Язовир Тополница (Bulgarian)
- Location: Sredna Gora at Muhovo
- Coordinates: 42°25′53″N 24°00′18″E
- Construction began: 1948
- Opening date: 1962

Dam and spillways
- Type of dam: concrete gravity dam
- Height: 78 m (256 ft)

Reservoir
- Creates: Topolnitsa Reservoir
- Total capacity: 137,000,000 m^{3} (111,000 acre⋅ft)
- Catchment area: 1,381 km^{2} (533 mi^{2})
- Surface area: 4.1 km^{2} (1,000 acres)

Topolnitsa Reservoir (Bulgarian: Тополница) is a dam and reservoir in the Sredna Gora mountain range of western Bulgaria. Administratively, it is located in Panagyurishte Municipality of Pazardzhik Province and Ihtiman Municipality of Sofia Province.

== Geography ==
The reservoir is situated along the upper middle course of the river Topolnitsa its section, where it forms the divide between Ihtimanska Sredna Gora to the west and Sashtinska Sredna Gora to the east. The right tributary of the Topolnitsa, the Mativir, flows from the west into the middle section of the reservoir. There are two settlements along its shores, the villages of Muhovo at the dam wall to the south, and Poibrene at its tail to the north. Topolnitsa Reservoir is accessible via the third class III-801 road at Muhovo and the third class III-801 road at Poibrene, which leads to the town of Panagyurishte further east. There are many villas and bungalows around the shores of the dam. It is an attractive destination for fishing and outdoors activities.

== Dam ==
The first hydrological studies for the construction of the dam were conducted in 1936. Construction began in 1948 and finished in 1963. The dam is built of concrete and reaches a height of 78 m and a length of 336 m. The dam spillway has a capacity of 1,500 m^{3}/s and is equipped with 4 valves. Topolnitsa Reservoir spans a territory of 4.1 km^{2}; the catchment area is 1,381 km^{2} with an annual precipitation of 603 mm. The projected volume is 137 million m^{3}.

It is the largest and lowermost of a cascade of three reservoirs constructed along the Topolnitsa, the other being Zhekov Vir and Dushantsi. The main purpose of the reservoir is to irrigate agricultural lands in the Upper Thracian Plain, spanning a territory of 694 km^{2} between Pazardzhik and Plovdiv, including 100 km^{2} rice paddy fields. There is a small hydro power plant built in its dam wall with a capacity of 9 MW.
