= Poibrene =

Poibrene Поибрене
- Village
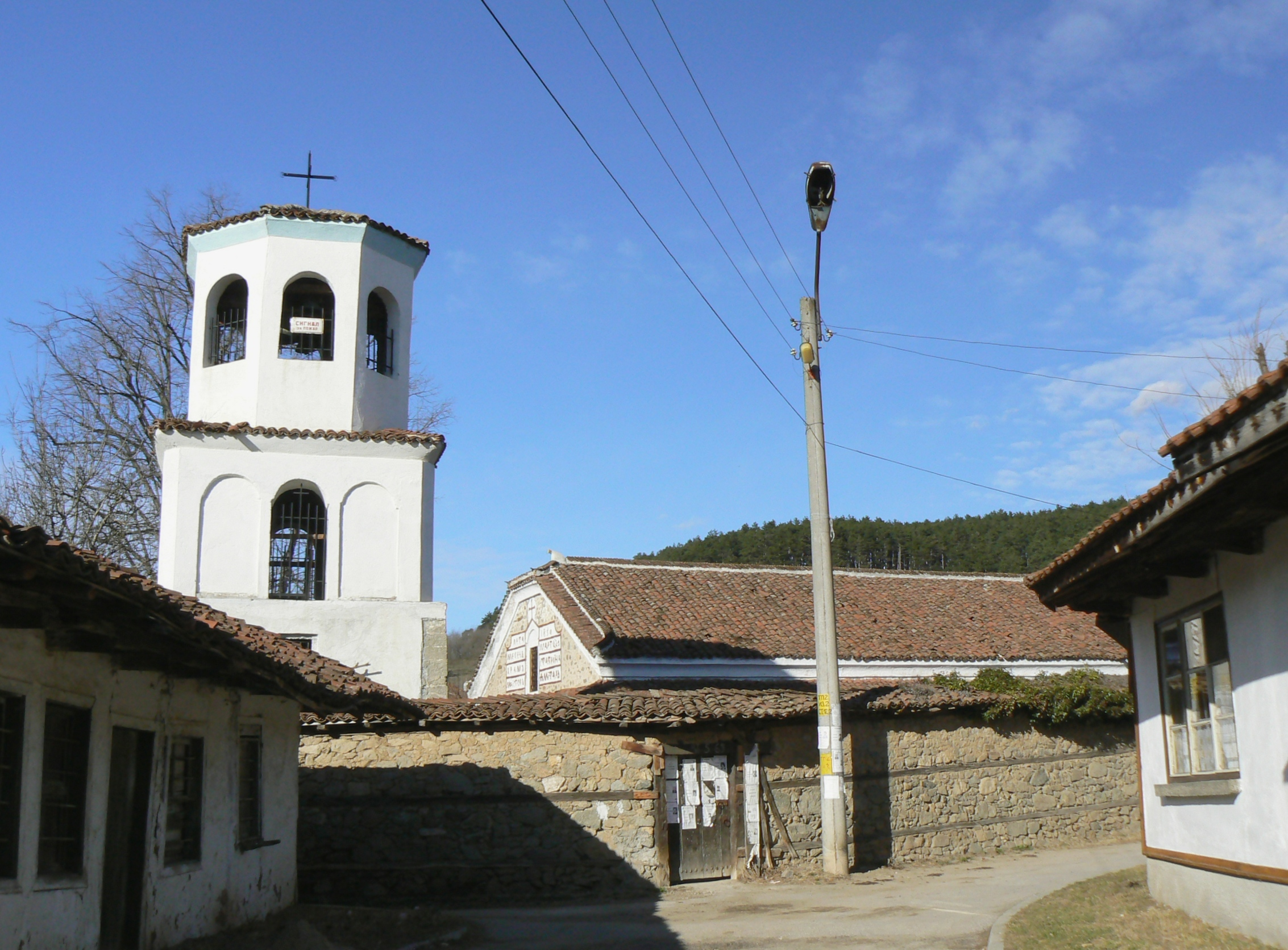

- Location of Poibrene
- Coordinates: 42°30′N 24°00′E
- Country: Bulgaria
- Provinces (Oblast): Pazardzhik Province

Government
  - Mayor: Ivan Pandurov (Euroroma)

Area
  - Total: 107.793 km^{2} (41.619 sq mi)
- Elevation: 416 m (1,365 ft)

Population (2007-01-01)
  - Total: 835
  - Density: 7.75/km^{2} (20.1/sq mi)
- Time zone: UTC+2 (EET)
  - Summer (DST): UTC+3 (EEST)
- Postal Code: 4524

Poibrene (Bulgarian: Поибрене) is a village in the Panagyurishte municipality, western Bulgaria. It is located 18 km (11 mi) west of the town and has 850 inhabitants. The large dam Topolnitsa is 1 km west of the village. Several monuments there commemorate participants in the April Uprising. Due to the dam, the baths and the clear natural environment, many citizens of Panagyurishte have summer houses in or near the village.

== Geography ==
Poibrene is located in the north-western part of the Pazardzhik Province on the left bank of the Topolnitsa river. The land of the village encompasses 108 km^{2} in Sashtinska and Ihtimanska Sredna Gora separated by the Poibrene Gap. The closest villages are Oborishte at 9 km to the east, Belitsa at 13 km to the west and Petrich at 14 km to the north. The centre of the municipality Panagyurishte lies at 18 km to the east. There are 3 buses from and to the capital Sofia and 5 buses from and to Panagyurishte daily.

The construction of the Topolnitsa Dam began in 1948 near the village and some of the neighbourhoods remained underwater.

In 1972 a mineral spring was discovered near Poibrene at depth of 610 m and temperature of the water 42 °C. The mineral bath in the village was constructed in 1979.

There are three shops, a restaurant, cafes and a small hotel. There is potential in village, spa and eco-tourism as well as hunting and fishing.

== History ==
The lands of the village were inhabited since antiquity. There are remains a dolmen with funeral gifts.

Two fortresses were constructed to defend the gorge called Asenovo kale and Shishmanovo kale. Many of the names of the localities around Poibrene are connected with battles and warfare in the past such as the Cry Mound, Grave, Battle Dingle, Vatahs Ditch, Asian Dingle and others.

During the Ottoman domination the village had a special status - the inhabitants did not pay taxes and were responsible for the security of the gorge. The Turks were not allowed to settle in the village. There were 18 neighbourhoods. The population took active part in the April Uprising. During the wars for National Unification, the two Balkan Wars and the First World War, Poibrene gave 176 killed and 18 missing soldiers. In 1934 the population reached 4,499.

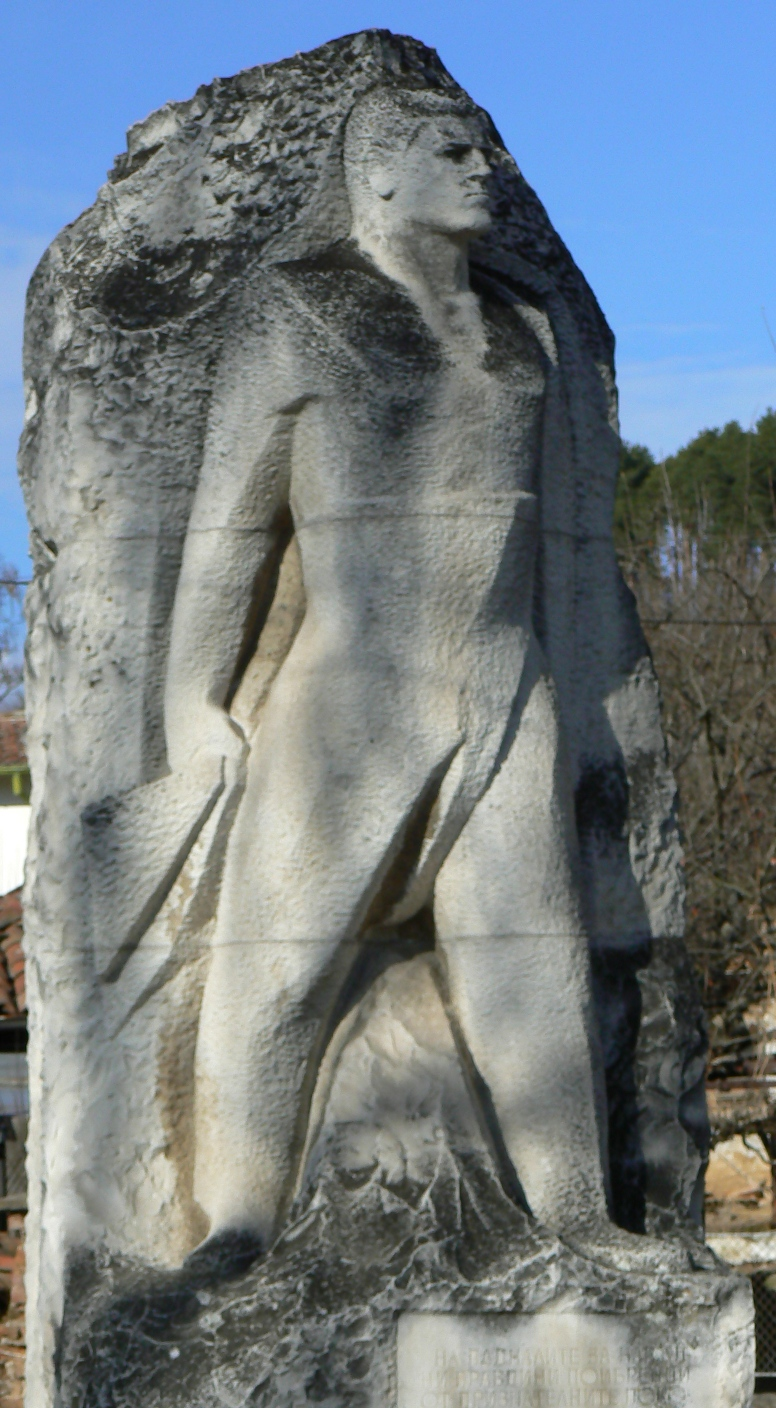
A monument to the fallen in the wars.

== Public institutions ==
- Village Hall
- Chitalishte "Vancho Pashov". The first chitalishte in Poibrene was built in 1885 and named "Zdravets". Nowadays the chitalishte is located in contemporary and functional edifice and named after a hero of the resistance. There is a library, a group for folk dances and songs, cinema and theatre hall and internet club.
- The church was built in 1830. With the silver cross from that church the priest Nedelyo Ivanov sanctified the Banner of Rayna Knyaginya.
- School with 135 pupils and kindergarten.

== Events ==
- The village holiday is at Holy Trinity - Pentecost

== Honours ==
Poibrene Heights in Antarctica are named after the village.
