= Petrich, Sofia Province =

Petrich Петрич
- Village
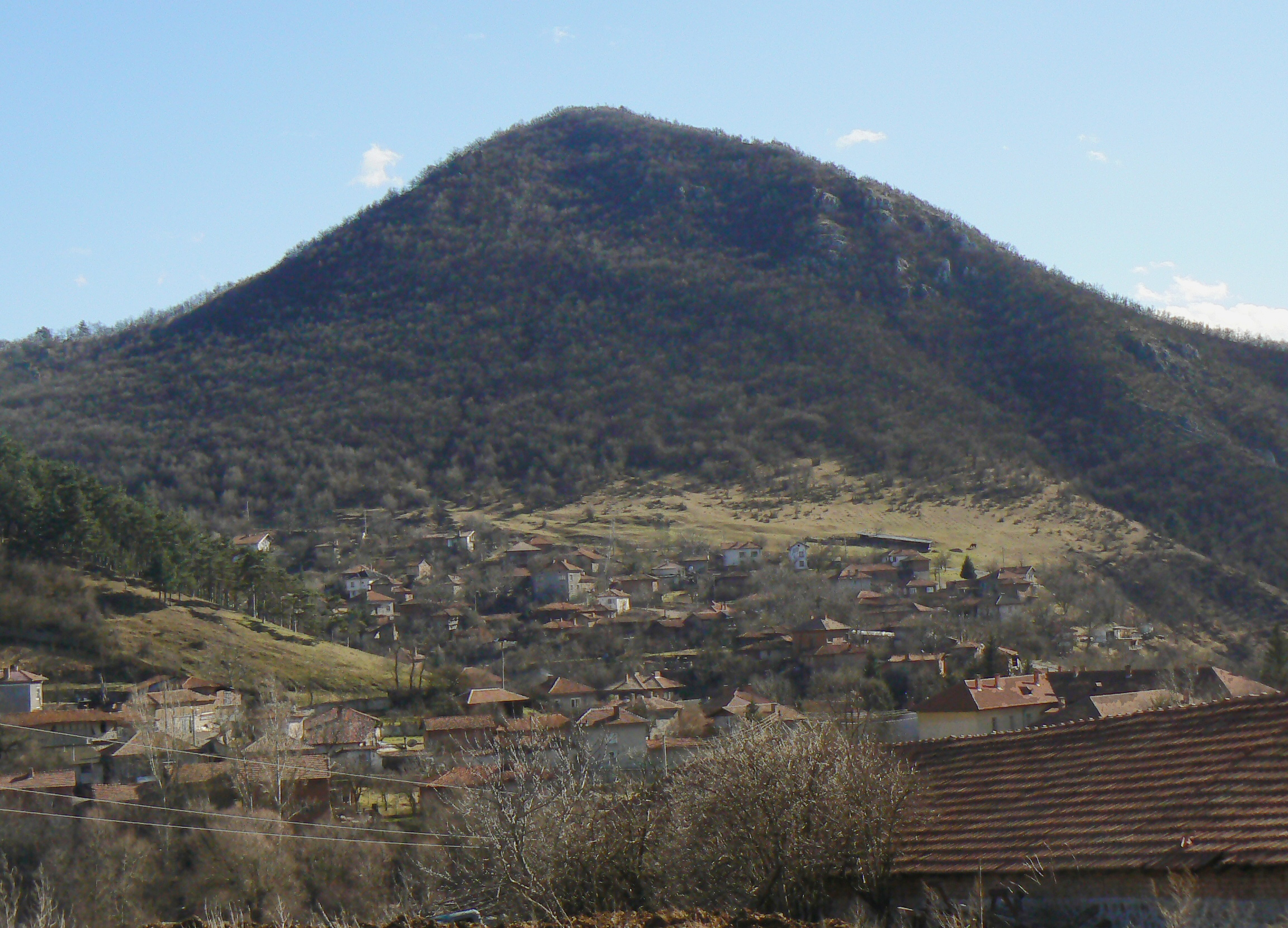

- Location of Petrich
- Coordinates: 42°35′N 24°01′E
- Country: Bulgaria
- Provinces (Oblast): Sofia Province
- Municipality (Obshtina): Zlatitsa

Government
  - Mayor: Ivan Uzunov

Area
  - Total: 67.193 km^{2} (25.943 sq mi)
- Elevation: 475 m (1,558 ft)

Population (2007-01-01)
  - Total: 288
  - Density: 4.29/km^{2} (11.1/sq mi)
- Time zone: UTC+2 (EET)
  - Summer (DST): UTC+3 (EEST)
- Postal Code: 2085

Petrich (Bulgarian: Петрич [pɛˈtrit͡ʃ]) is a village in Zlatitsa Municipality, in Sofia Province, western Bulgaria. The name of the village is pronounced with a stress on the last syllable, in contrast with the name of the town of Petrich.

== Geography ==
Petrich is located in Ihtimanska Sredna Gora in the forested valley of the river Topolnitsa which flows through the village. The neighbourhood Brodyad is part of the village although it is located at several kilometers from the center.

== History ==
The village took active part in the April Uprising. On 23 April 1876 Georgi Benkovski arrived in Petrich with his Flying Cheta. The population helped by the villagers from Smolsko and Kamenitsa fought bravely against the Ottoman regular and irregular army. One hundred and seventy-two rebels were killed in the fighting and dozens were captured and exiled. The event is commemorated annually with fireworks at the monument of the uprising which resembles a bell and symbolizes the bells which were melted for bullets.

According to the Treaty of Berlin of 1878 the border between the liberated Principality of Bulgaria and the autonomous Eastern Rumelia followed the summit of the Balkan Mountains and went southwards between Pirdop and Dushintsi eventually following the Topolnitsa river at Petrich.

== Landmarks ==
- St Nikolay Church
- Monument to the fallen Russian soldiers in the Liberation War
- Monument to the casualties of the Patriotic War (1944-1945)

== Gallery ==
Images

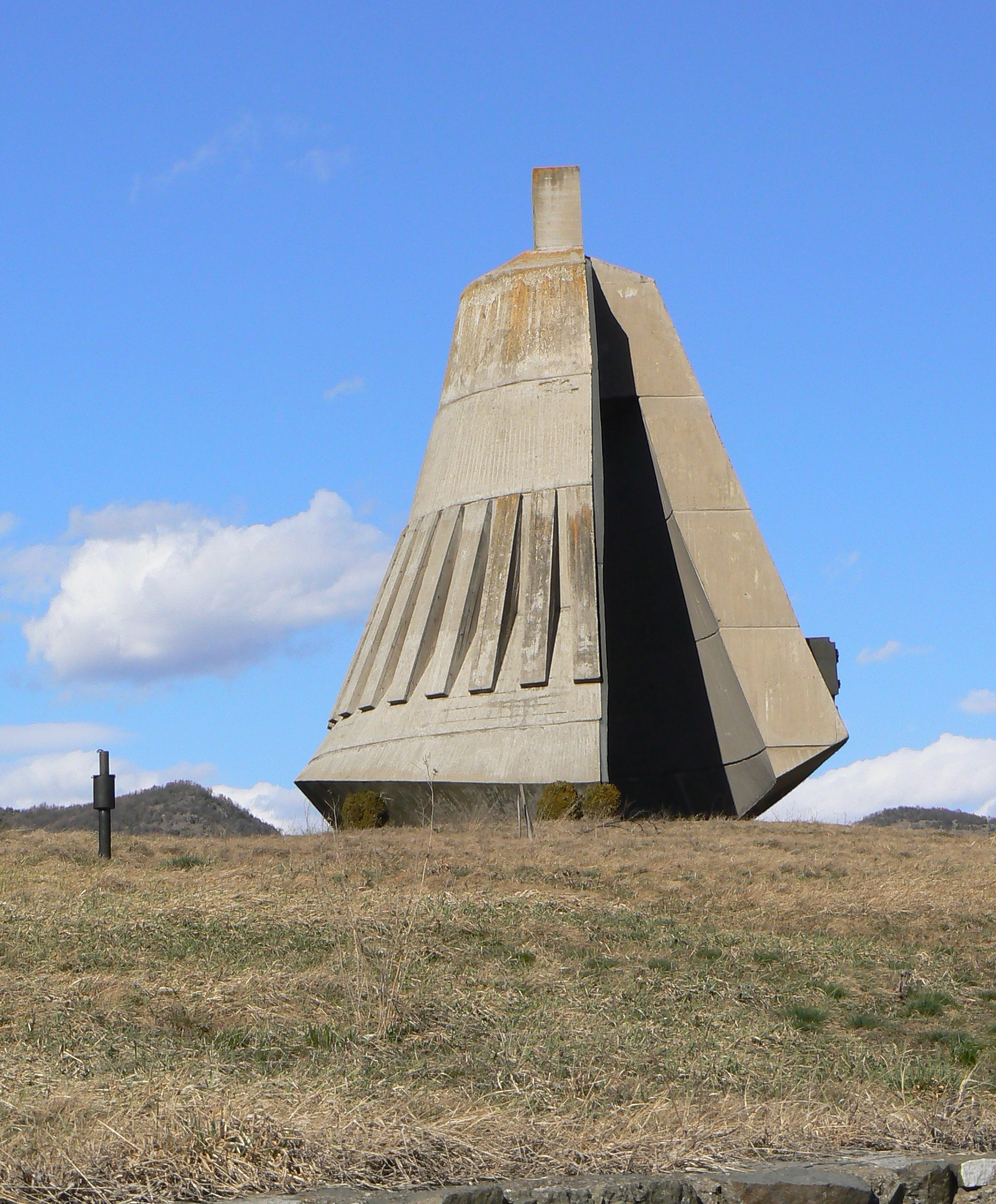
The monument to the April Uprising

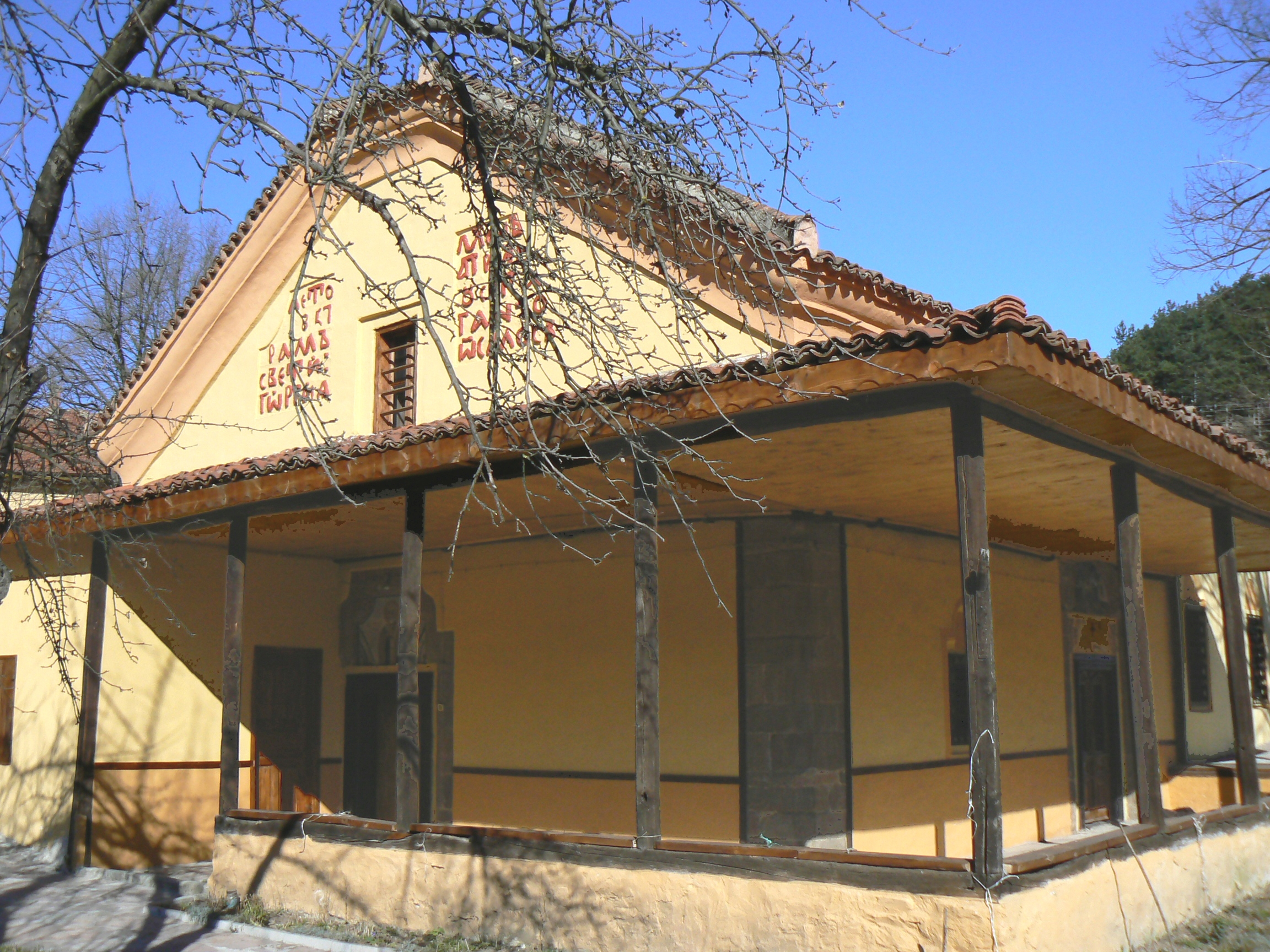
St Nikolay Church

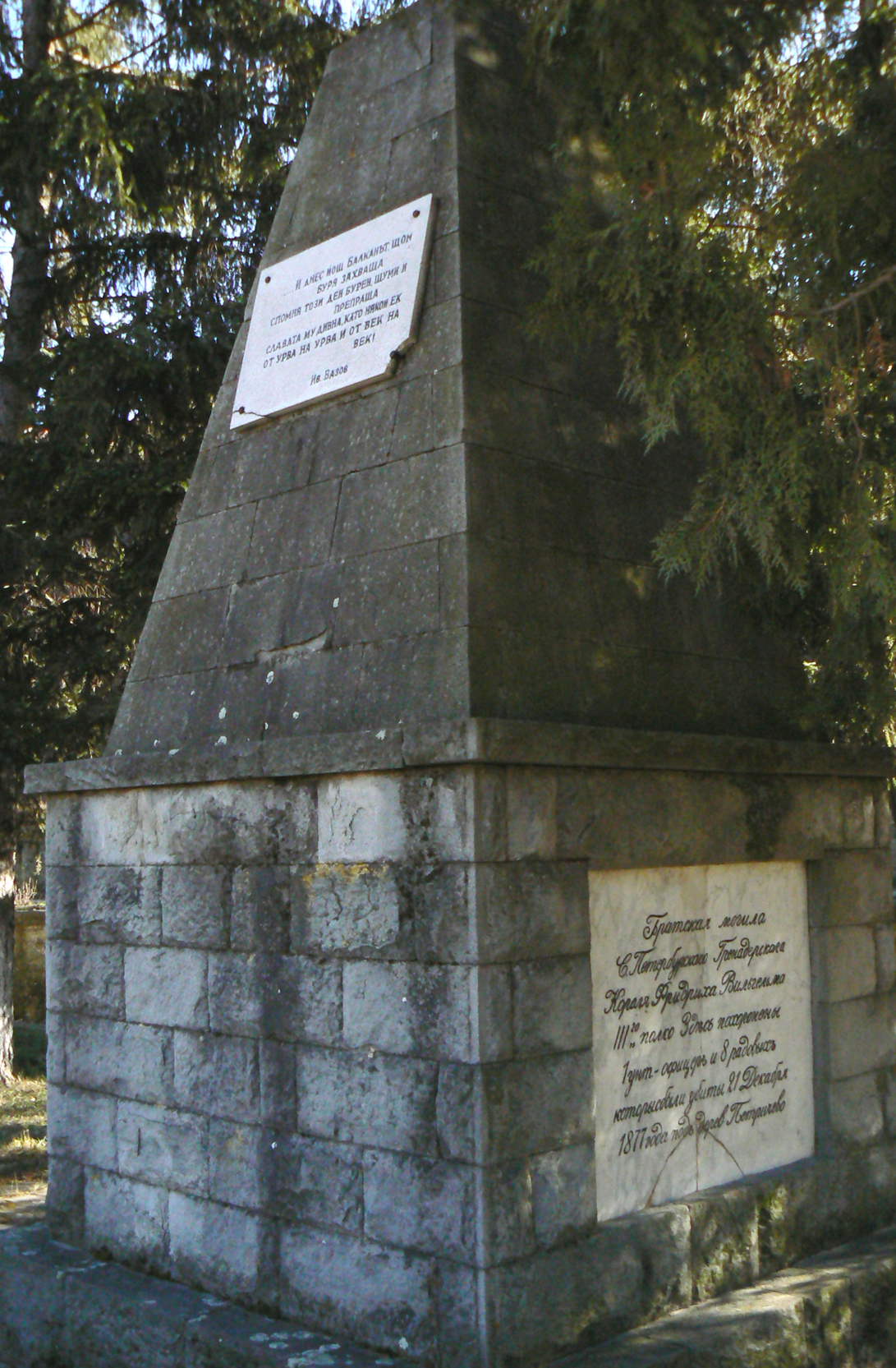
Common Mound

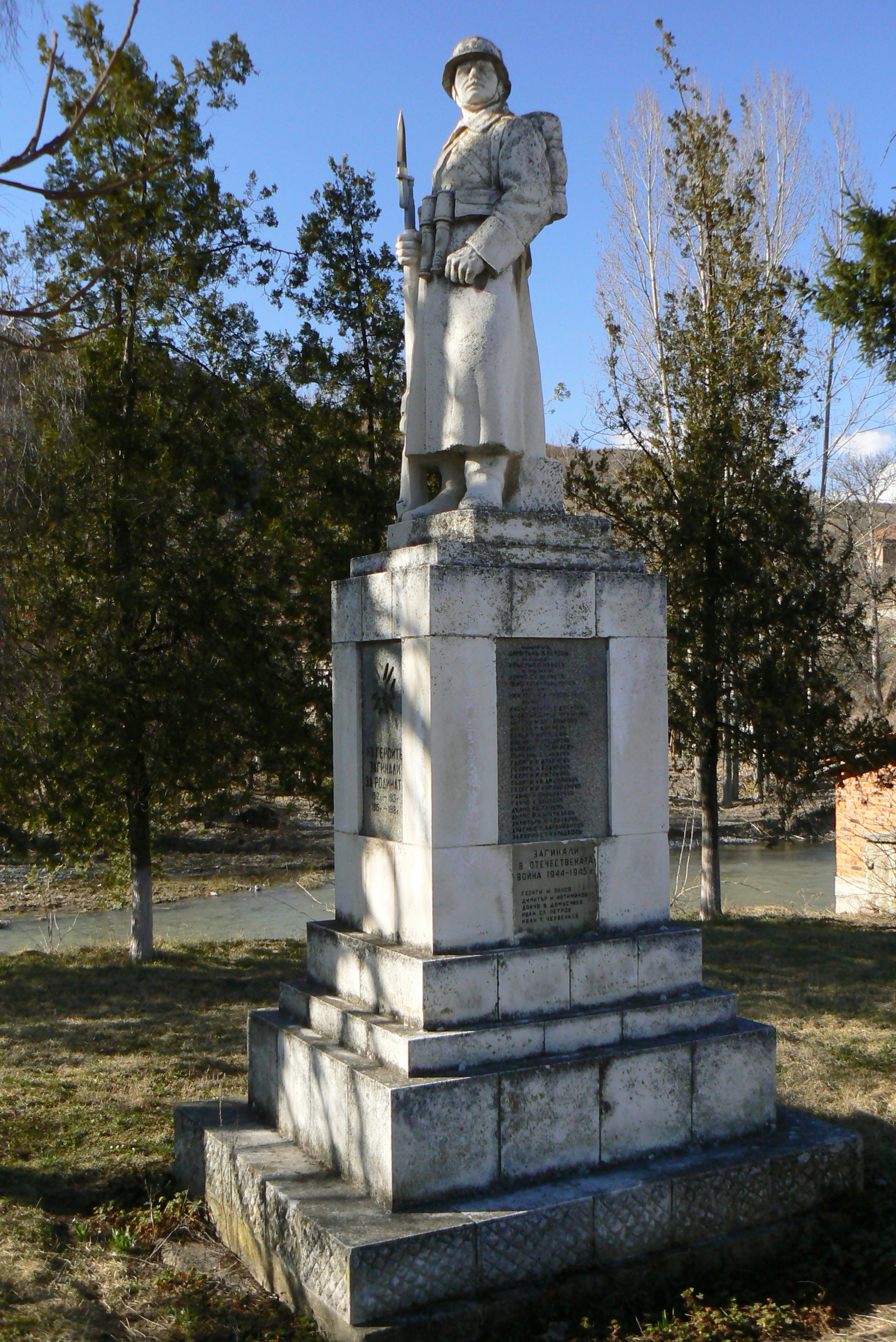
Monument to the casualties in the Patriotic War
