= Topolnitsa (river) =

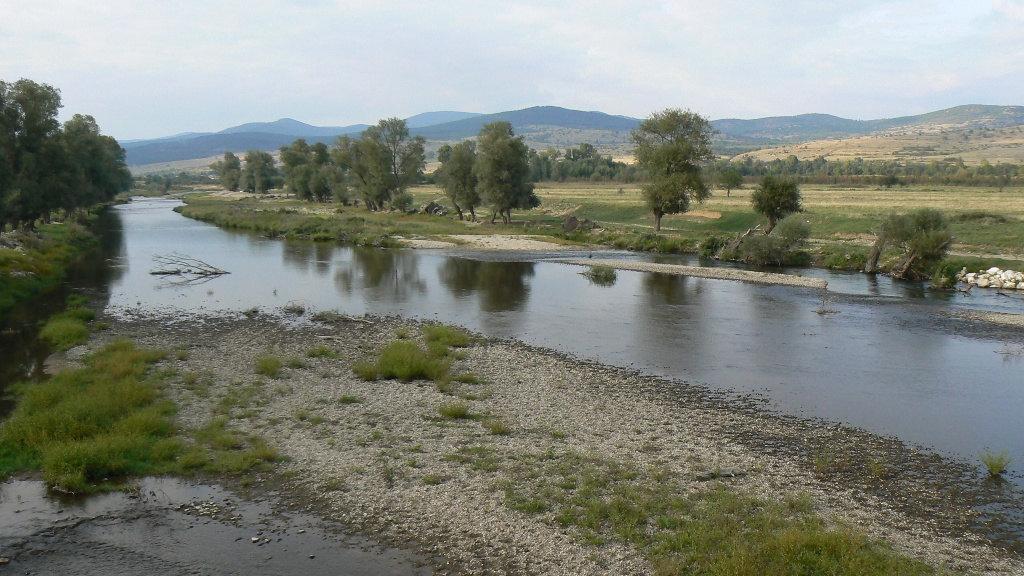
- The Topolnitsa as seen from Trakiya motorway

Location
- Country: Bulgaria

Physical characteristics
- Source
  - location: east of Bich, Sredna Gora
  - coordinates: 42°37′8.04″N 24°17′35.16″E
  - elevation: 1,413 m (4,636 ft)
- Mouth
  - location: Maritsa
  - coordinates: 42°11′13.92″N 24°18′1.08″E
  - elevation: 205 m (673 ft)
- Length: 155 km (96 mi)
- Basin size: 1,789 km^{2} (691 sq mi)

Basin features
- Progression: Maritsa→ Aegean Sea

The Topolnitsa (Bulgarian: Тополница [toˈpɔɫnit͡ʃɐ]) is a river in southern Bulgaria, an important left tributary of the Maritsa. The river's name is derived from the Bulgarian word топола, topola ("poplar"). Reaching length of 155 km, the Topolnitsa is the fourth longest river in the Maritsa drainage, following the Tundzha (390 km), the Arda (290 km) and the Ergene (281 km).

== Geography ==
The river takes its source at an altitude of 1,413 m near the eastern foothills of the summit of Bich (1,449 m) in the mountain range of Sredna Gora. In its first 12 km, the Topolnitsa flows eastwards in a deep forested valley. It then turns in northern direction, flows through the Koprivshtitsa Valley and enters another deep valley. Following the Koprivshtitsa Railway Station, the river turns west-southwest and enters the Zlatitsa–Pirdop Valley, where its flows through its southern areas. At the village of Petrich, it turns southwards and flows through a deep valley dividing two major sections of Sredna Gora — Ihtimanska Sredna Gora to the west and Sashtinska Sredna Gora to the east. Downstream of the dam of the Topolnitsa Reservoir the river takes a southeastern turn. At the village of Kalugerovo the Topolnitsa enters the Upper Thracian Plain, where the riverbed is corrected with protective dikes. It flows into the Maritsa at an altitude of 205 m about one kilometer west of the city of Pazardzhik.

Its drainage basin covers a territory of 1789 km^{2} or 3.4% of Maritsa's total. It borders the drainage basins of the rivers Iskar to the north and northwest, Vit to the north, Stryama to the northeast and Luda Yana to the east. The main tributaries are the Medetska reka, Berereyska, Zlatishka, Bunovska, Mativir and Pavel.

The Topolnitsa has predominantly rain-snow feed with high water in March–June and low water in August–October. The average annual discharge is 3.75 m^{3}/s at the confluence of its tributary Medetska reka and 10 m^{3}/s at the village of Lesichovo.

== Settlements and economy ==
The river is situated in Sofia Province and Pazardzhik Province. There are 11 settlements along its course: the town of Koprivshtitsa and the villages of Dushantsi, Petrich, Muhovo, Poibrene, Lesichovo, Kalugerovo, Dinkata, Pamidovo, Yunatsite and Dragor. There are two main roads through its valley, a 16.4 km stretch of the third class III-606 road Koprivshtitsa–Strelcha–Trud and a 35.3 km stretch of the third class III-803 road Ihtiman–Lesichovo–Pazardzhik.

Its waters are utilised for irrigation in the Zlatitsa–Pirdop Valley and the Upper Thracian Plain, via the reservoirs of Dushantsi, Zhekov Vir and Topolnitsa. The latter allows the irrigation of about 350 km^{2} arable land and also has a small hydro power station (9 MW). In the area of its upper course there two tailings dams, related to the major Asarel Medet copper mine.

== Gallery ==
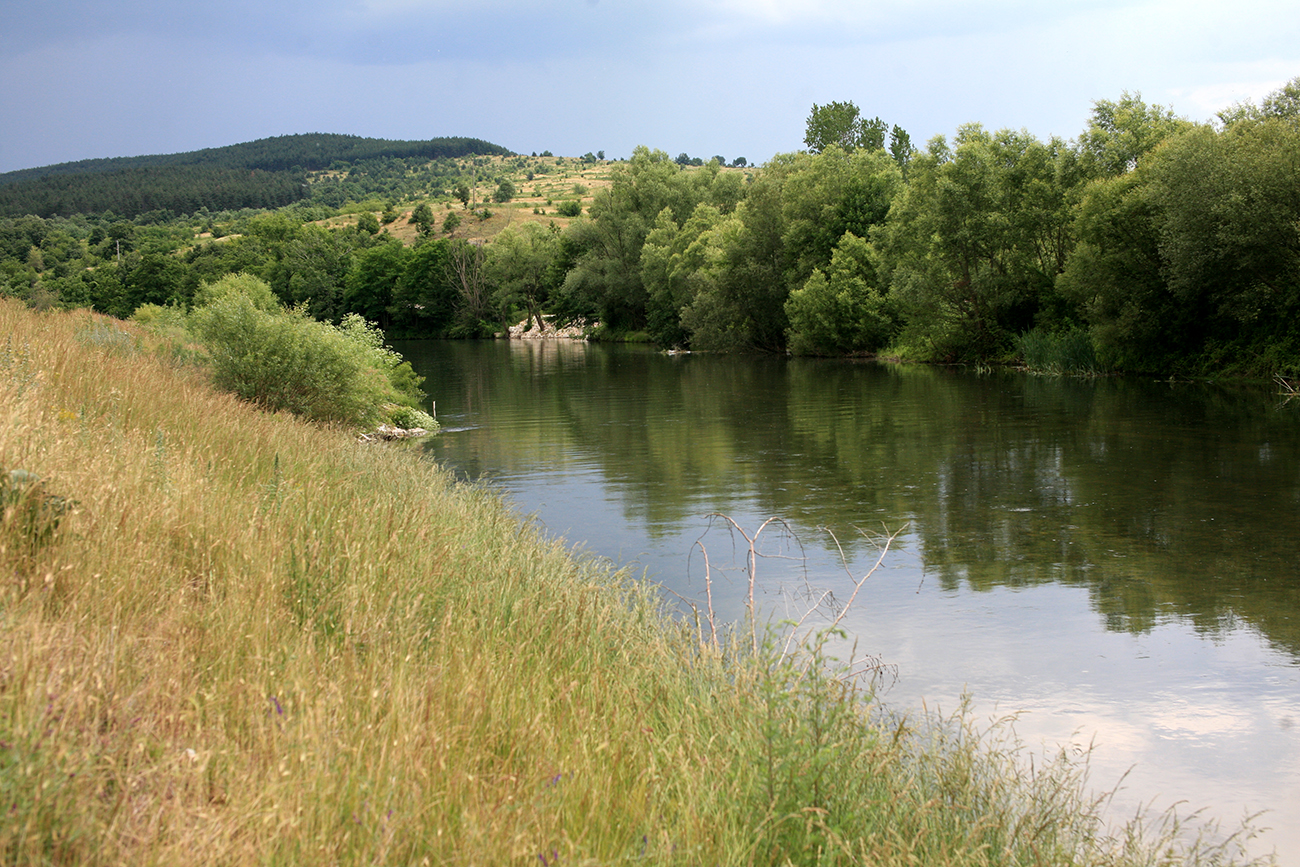
Topolnitsa at Lesichovo

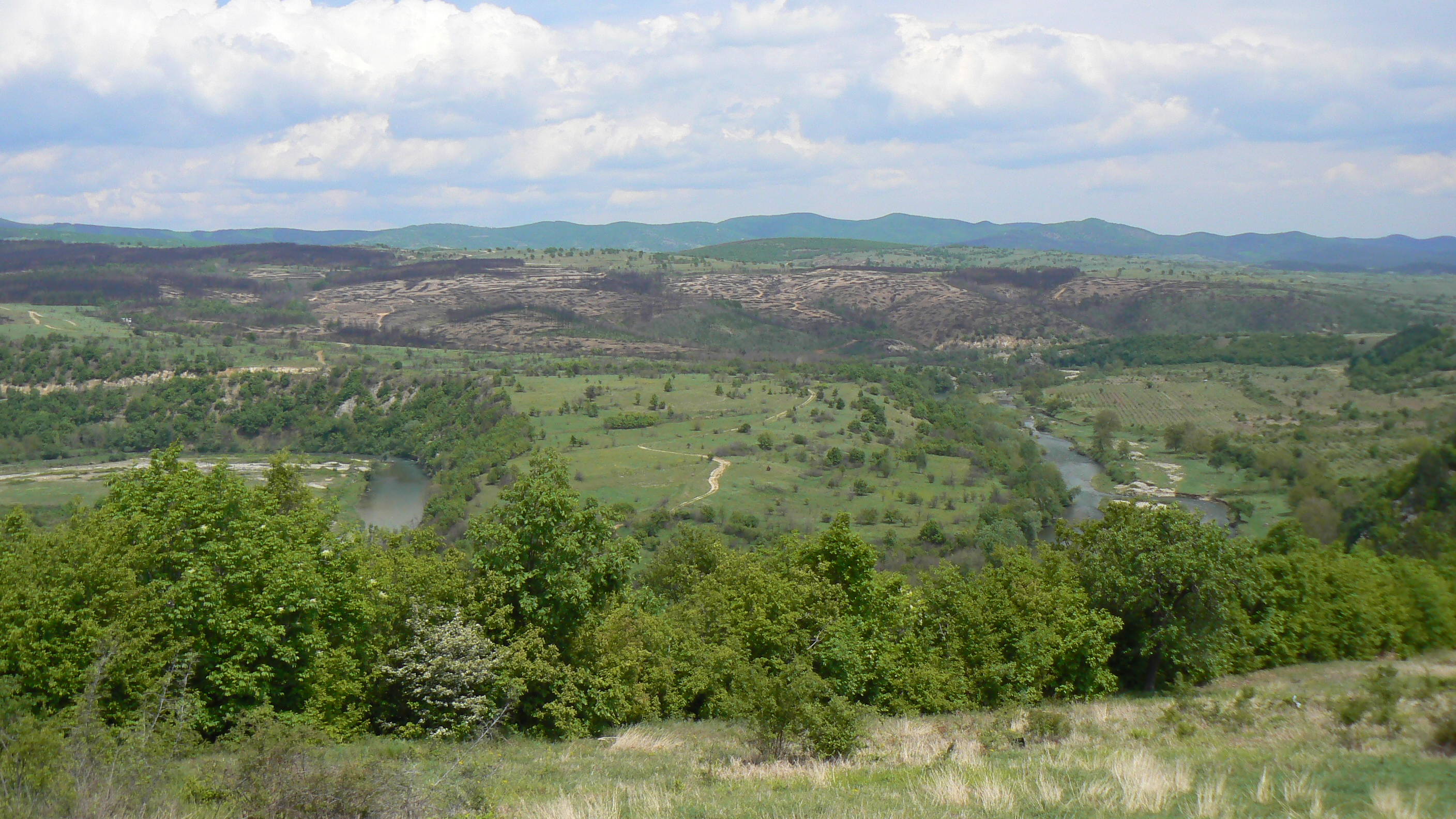
Topolnitsa between Tserovo and Muhovo

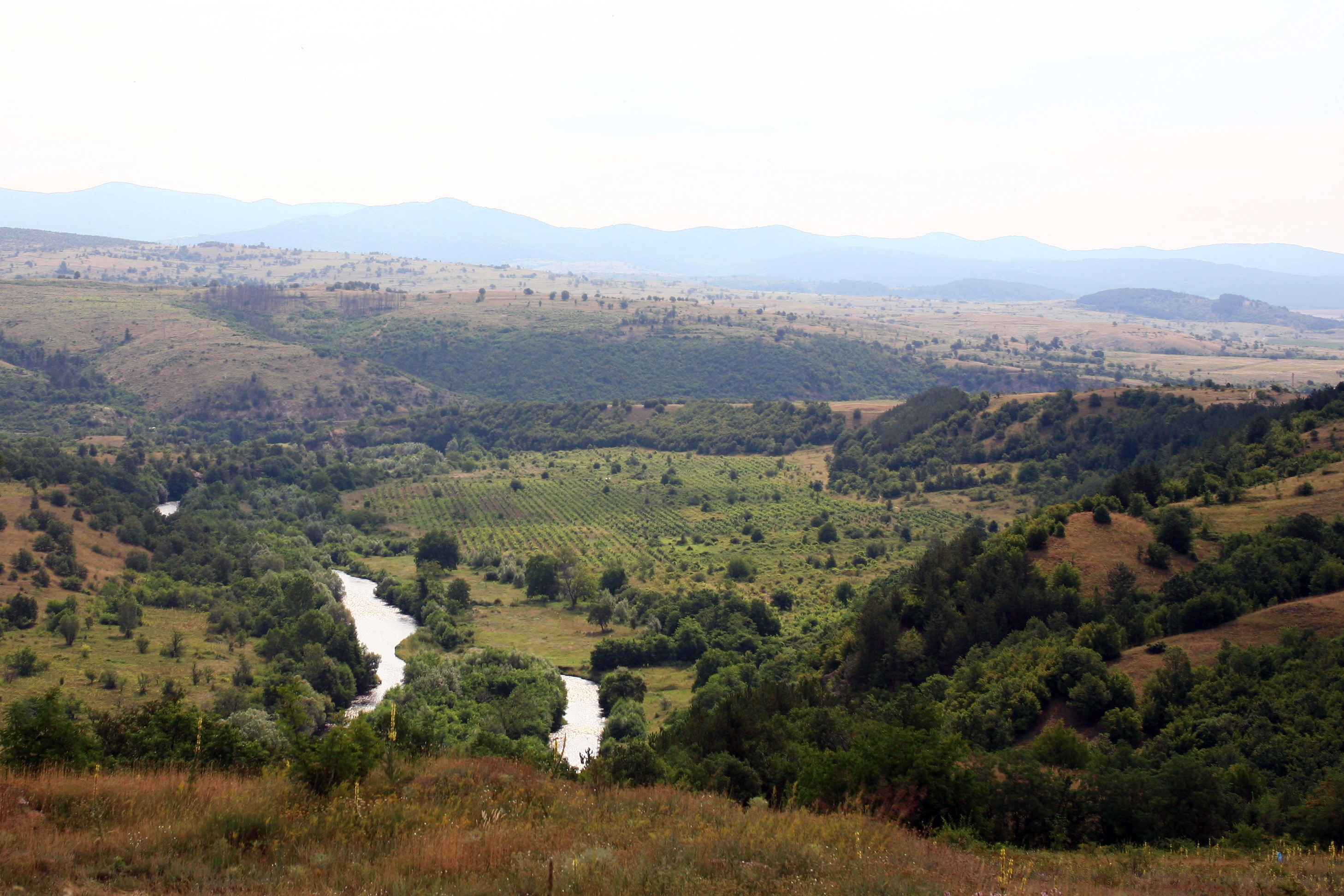
Topolnitsa at Tserovo
