= Vakarel =

Coordinates: 42°33′00″N 23°43′00″E

Vakarel (Bulgarian: Вакарел) is a village, 23 km (14 mi) away from Sofia, the capital of Bulgaria.

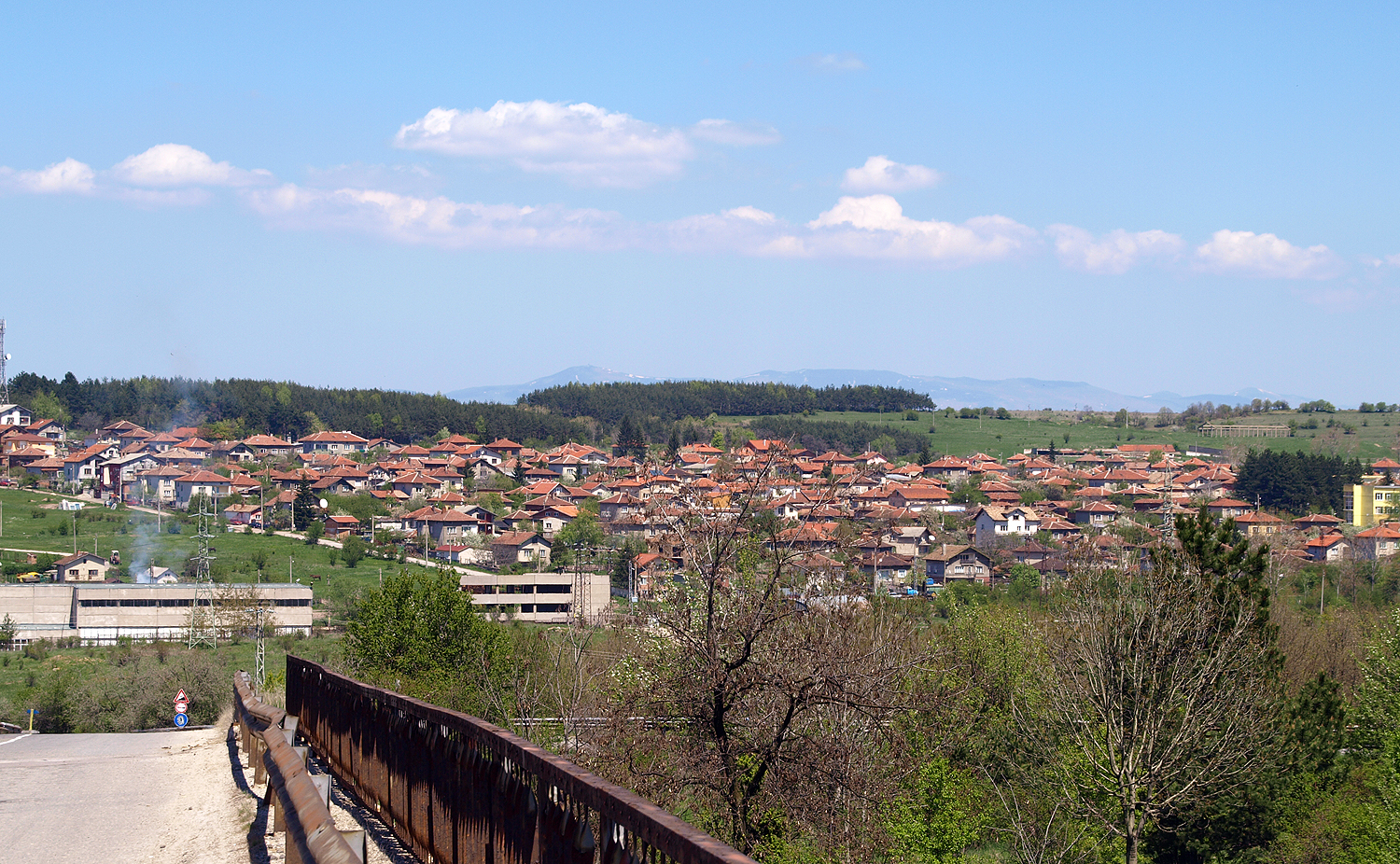
View of Vakarel

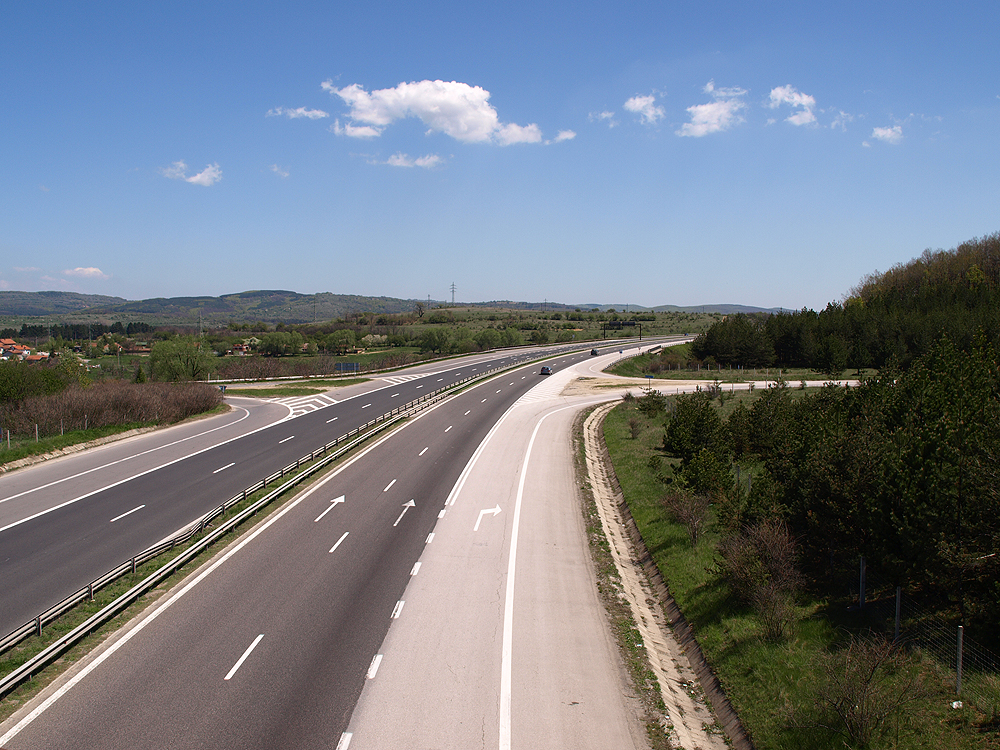
Trakiya motorway Vakarel junction

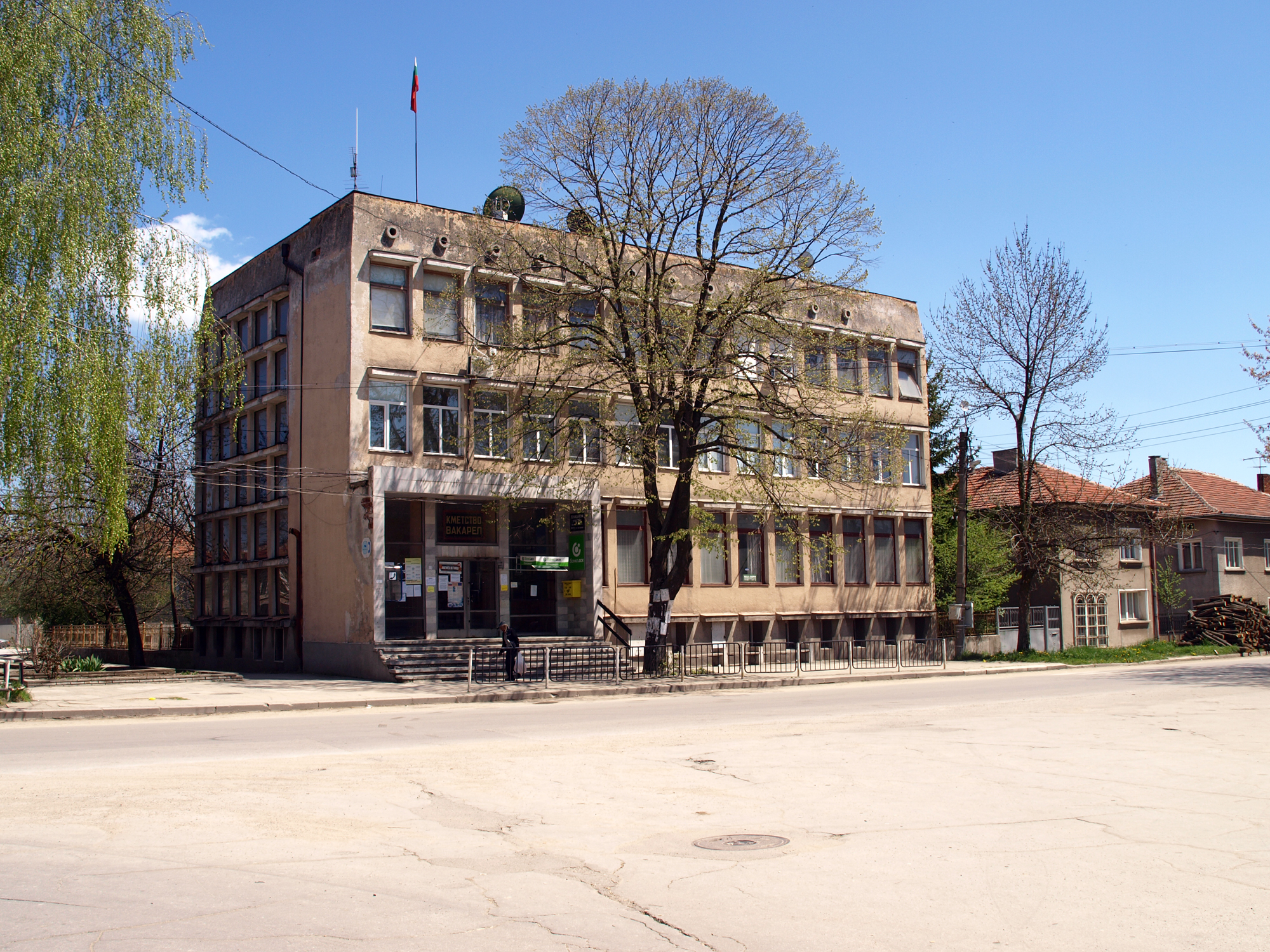
Vakarel Town hall

Population: 1984 people. It is situated in the Sredna Gora mountains, within Ihtiman Municipality. The village is an important transport knot along the Sofia - Plovdiv railway route. The Trakiya motorway runs near Vakarel. Vakarel is 822 meters above sea level.
About 1 km (1 mi) away from the village is the Vakarel Radio Transmitter. Near Vakarel is the Vakarelian Monastery 'Saint Petka'. The monastery is relatively new, established in the 20th century. Its yearly celebration is on 14 October.
Residential areas are also around Vakarel.

Vakarel's name is of Aromanian (Balkan Latin) origin, from the word vacarel, "cattleshed, cowshed" or with the Aromanian diminutive suffix –el, "young cowherd", cf. Romanian văcar, "cowboy, neatherd".

== Gallery ==
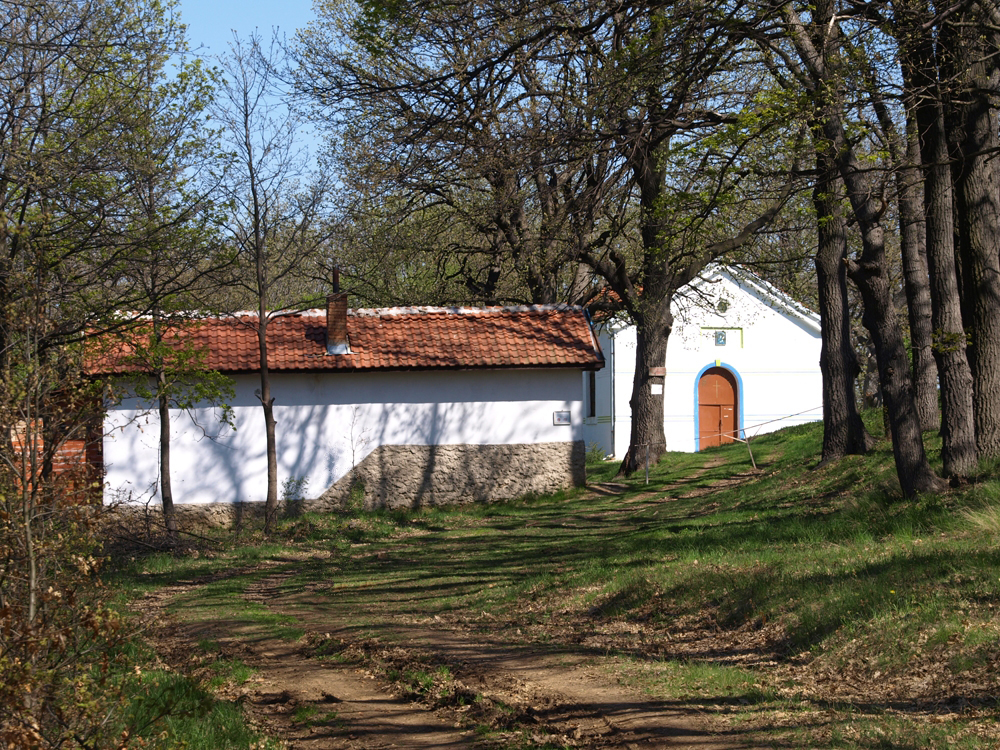
Vacareiian Monastery St. Petka

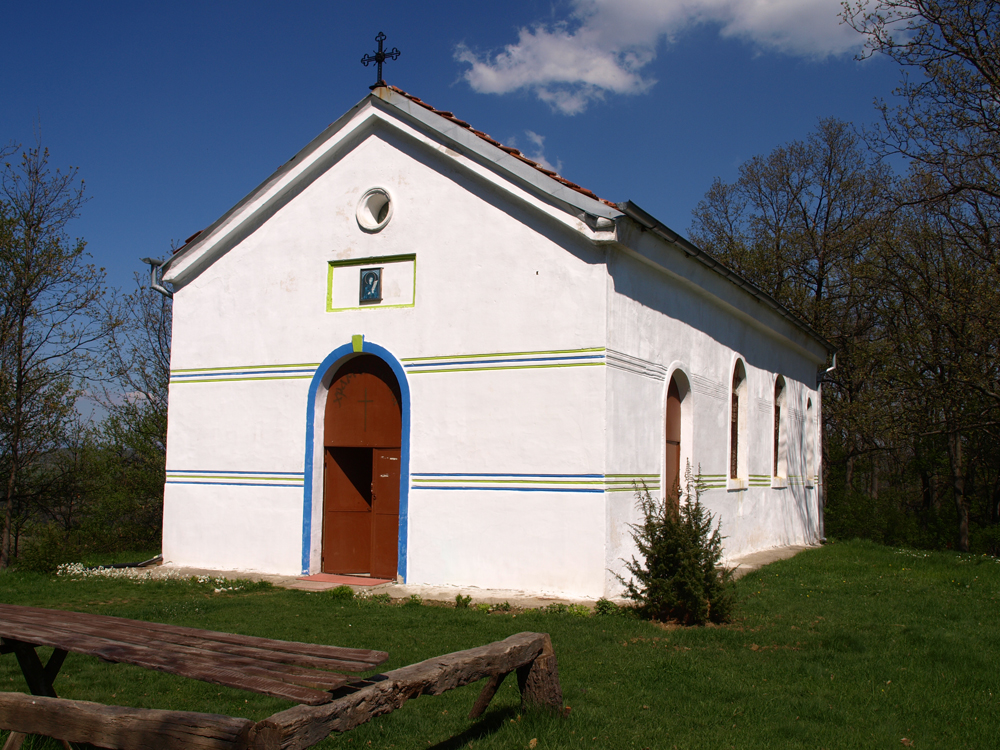
St. Petka Church of Vakarelian Monastery St. Petka

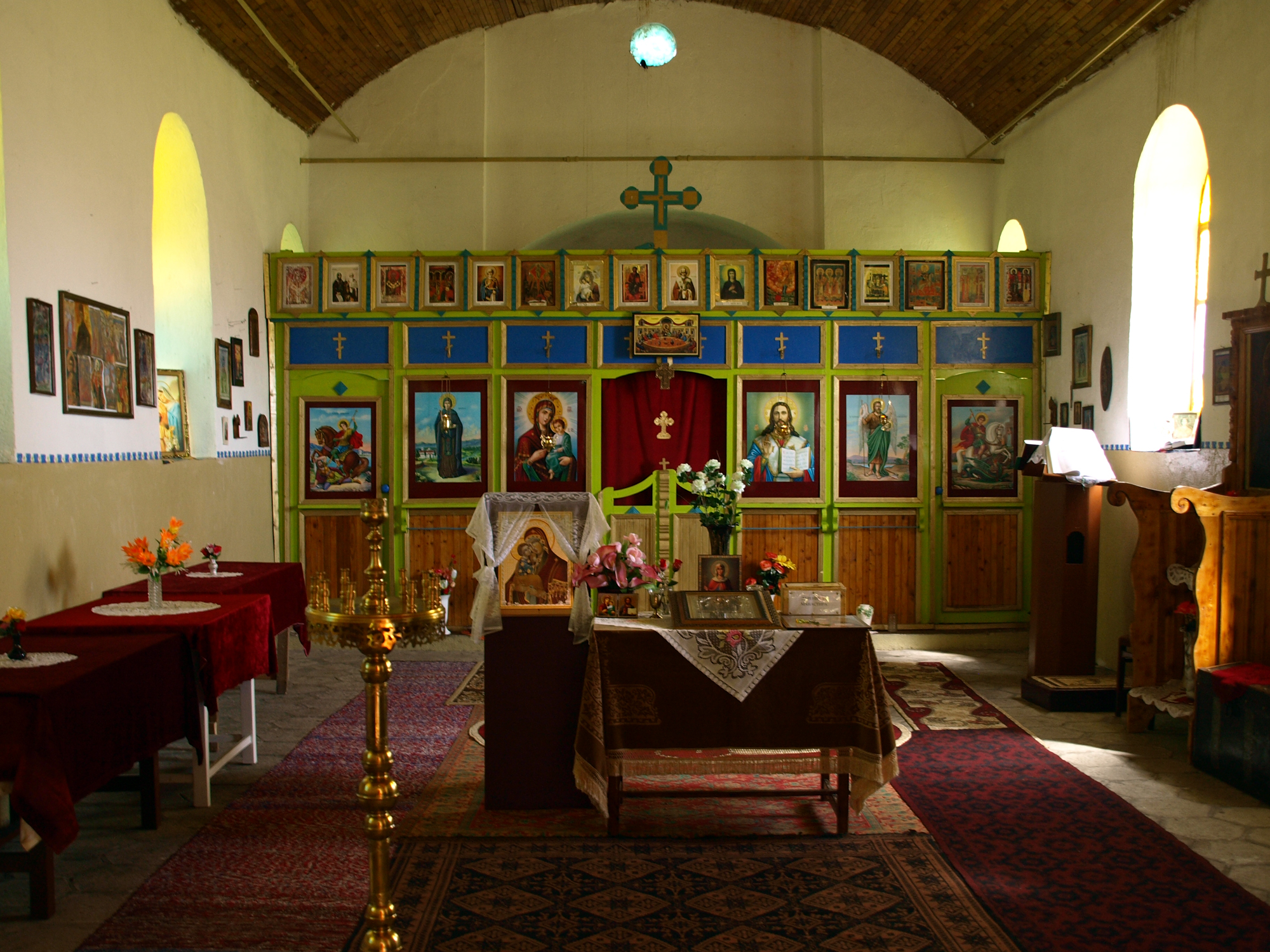
Interior of St. Petka Church in Vacarelian Monastery

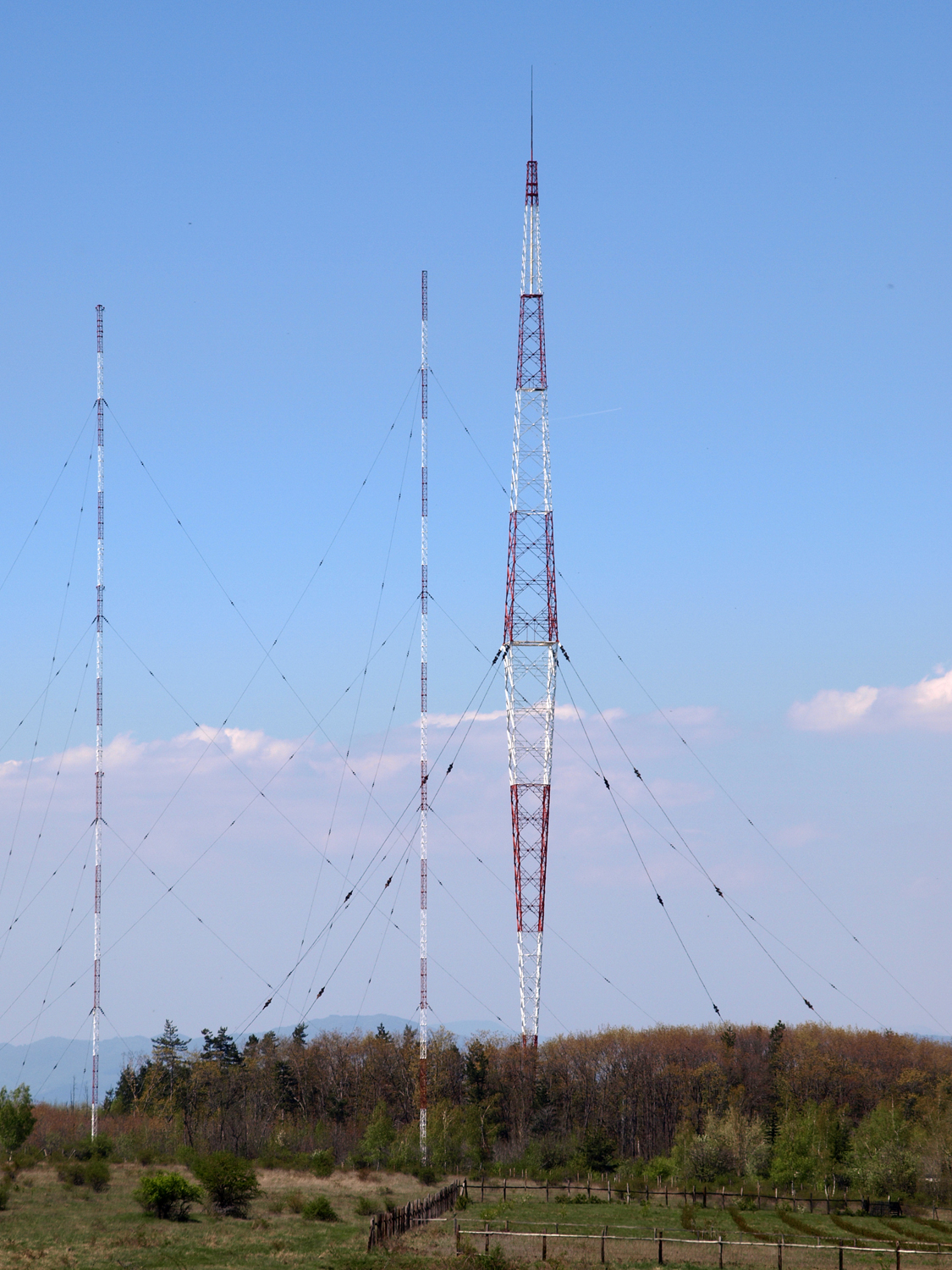
Vakarel radio transmitter

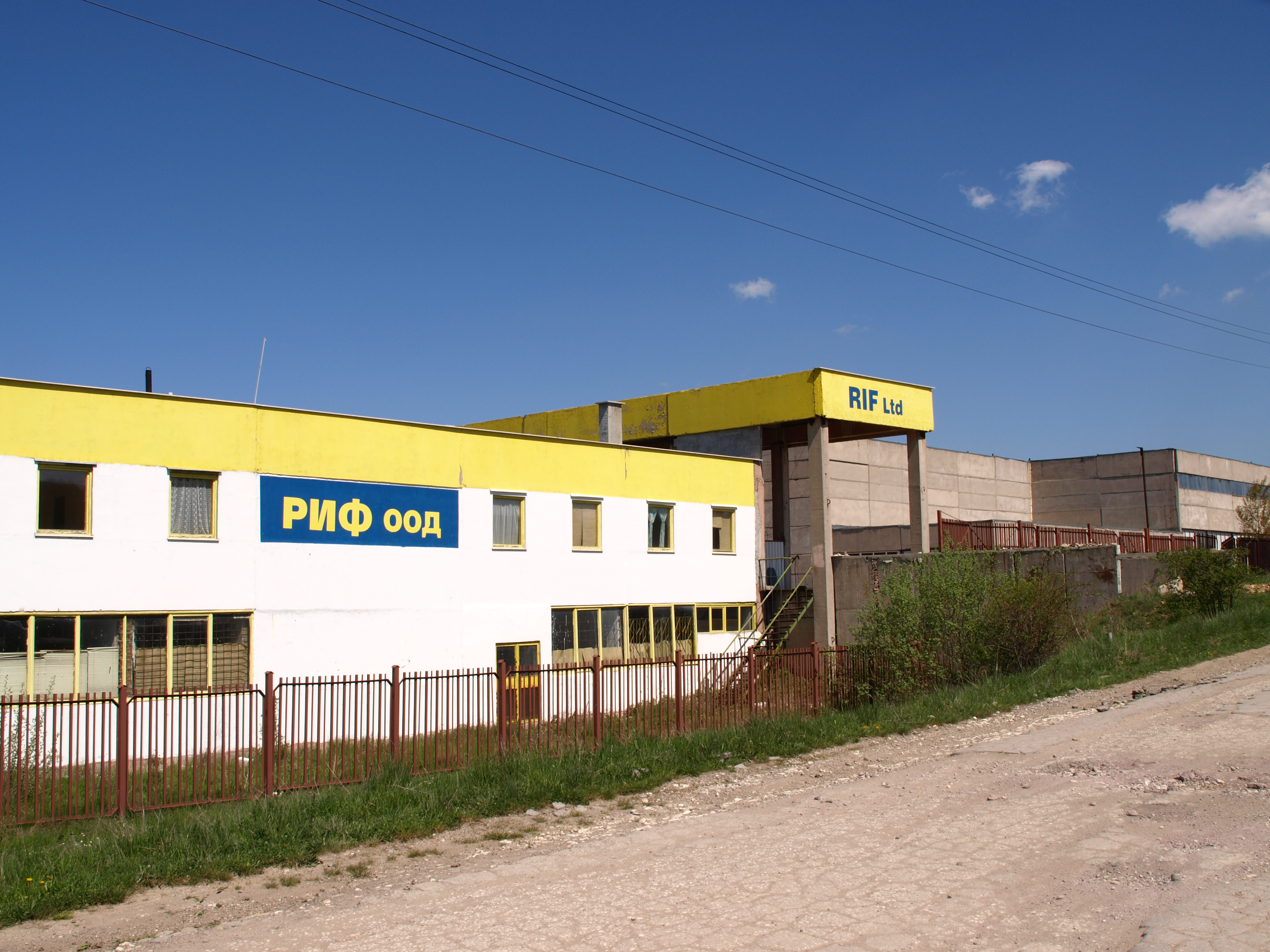
RIF Ltd. - a construction materials company, based in Vakarel

== Honour ==
Vakarel Saddle on Smith Island, South Shetland Islands is named after Vakarel.
