= Ihtiman =

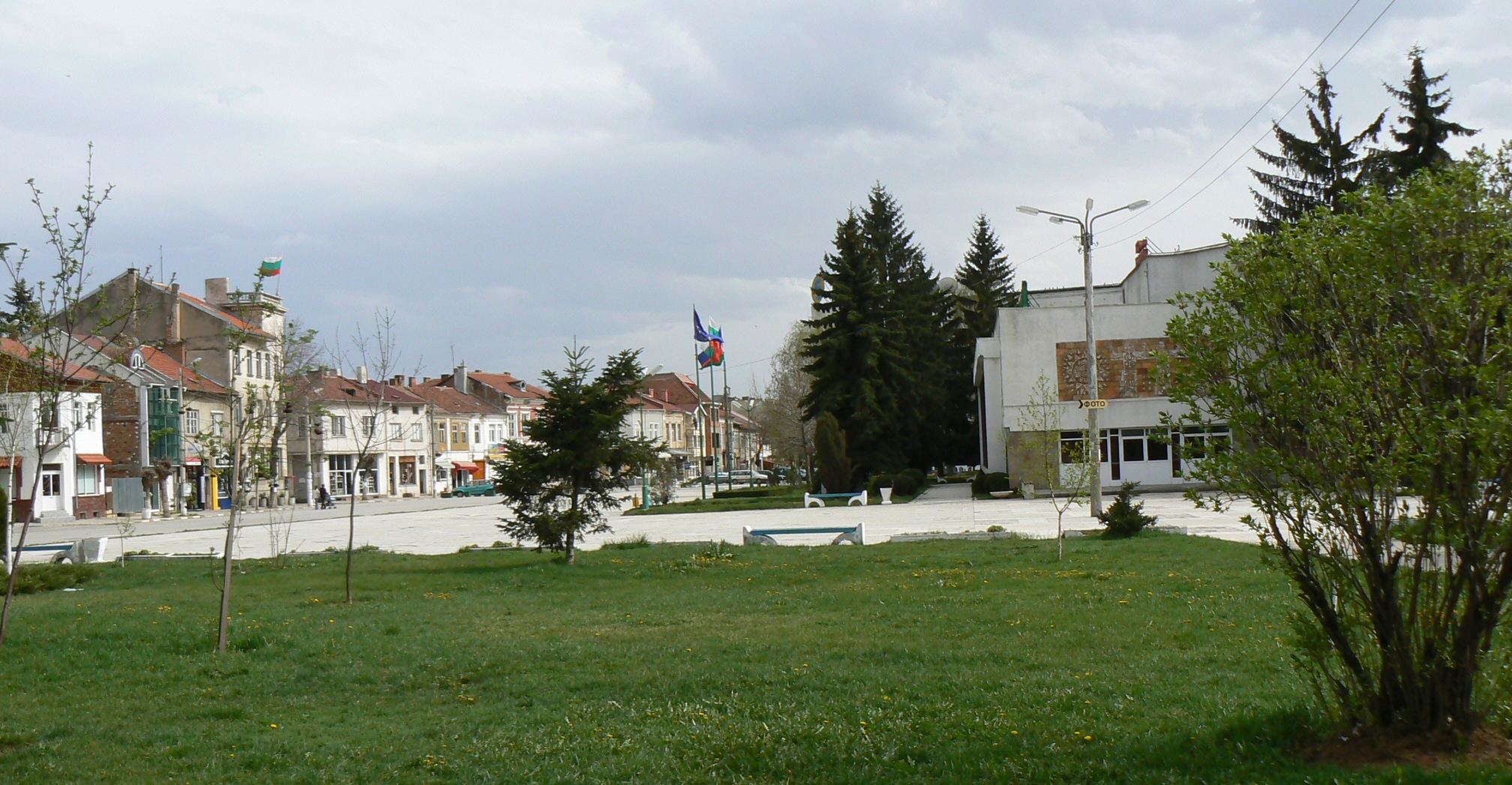

- Location of Ihtiman Ihtiman (Balkans)
- Coordinates: 42°26′24″N 23°48′54″E
- Country: Bulgaria
- Province (Oblast): Sofia Province

Government
  - Mayor: Kaloyan Iliev
- Elevation: 658 m (2,159 ft)

Population (13 September 2005)
  - Total: 14,525
- Time zone: UTC+2 (EET)
  - Summer (DST): UTC+3 (EEST)
- Postal Code: 2050
- Area code: 0724

Ihtiman (Bulgarian: Ихтиман [ixtiˈman]) is a town in western Bulgaria, part of Sofia Province. It is located in the Ihtiman Valley of the Ihtimanska Sredna Gora mountain range and lies in a valley 48 km from Sofia and 95 km from Plovdiv, close to the Trakiya motorway.

Formerly a Roman defensive station guarding the important roads to the Bosphorus, Ihtiman was then called Stipon. It continued to play this role under the Byzantine Empire and later under the First and Second Bulgarian Empires, with the main defensive centre in the region of the Gate of Trajan hill pass. In 986 the Bulgarian Emperor Samuel dealt a crushing defeat on the Byzantines in the battle of the Gates of Trajan.

Following the Ottoman conquest of Bulgaria in the 14th century, the town's name was changed to Ihtiman, which is thought to be of Ottoman Turkish origin.

The traditional and dominant religion is Eastern Orthodox Christianity.

Ihtiman Hook on Livingston Island in the South Shetland Islands, Antarctica is named after Ihtiman.

== Climate ==
Ihtiman has a temperate continental climate with very cold and snowy winters and not too hot, relatively short summers. The average annual temperature is 8.9C.

Climate data for Ikhtiman
| Month | Jan | Feb | Mar | Apr | May | Jun | Jul | Aug | Sep | Oct | Nov | Dec | Year |
|---|---|---|---|---|---|---|---|---|---|---|---|---|---|
| Record high °C (°F) | 18.5 (65.3) | 21.2 (70.2) | 30.4 (86.7) | 28.5 (83.3) | 33.4 (92.1) | 35.4 (95.7) | 37.5 (99.5) | 42.5 (108.5) | 36.9 (98.4) | 32.8 (91.0) | 25.8 (78.4) | 19.2 (66.6) | 42.5 (108.5) |
| Mean daily maximum °C (°F) | 3.3 (37.9) | 5.8 (42.4) | 10.7 (51.3) | 16.6 (61.9) | 21.3 (70.3) | 25.2 (77.4) | 28.1 (82.6) | 28.0 (82.4) | 23.7 (74.7) | 17.8 (64.0) | 10.9 (51.6) | 4.9 (40.8) | 16.4 (61.5) |
| Daily mean °C (°F) | −1.5 (29.3) | 0.5 (32.9) | 5.4 (41.7) | 10.2 (50.4) | 14.9 (58.8) | 18.7 (65.7) | 21.2 (70.2) | 21.0 (69.8) | 16.5 (61.7) | 11.5 (52.7) | 6.0 (42.8) | 0.4 (32.7) | 10.4 (50.7) |
| Mean daily minimum °C (°F) | −5.2 (22.6) | −3.8 (25.2) | 0.1 (32.2) | 3.7 (38.7) | 8.5 (47.3) | 11.1 (52.0) | 13.4 (56.1) | 13.0 (55.4) | 9.2 (48.6) | 5.1 (41.2) | 1.1 (34.0) | −3.2 (26.2) | 4.4 (39.9) |
| Record low °C (°F) | −33.9 (−29.0) | −31 (−24) | −28 (−18) | −9.6 (14.7) | −3.7 (25.3) | −1.2 (29.8) | 1.5 (34.7) | 1.3 (34.3) | −5.8 (21.6) | −8.4 (16.9) | −19.5 (−3.1) | −33.5 (−28.3) | −33.9 (−29.0) |
| Average precipitation mm (inches) | 39 (1.5) | 30 (1.2) | 38 (1.5) | 50 (2.0) | 70 (2.8) | 78 (3.1) | 59 (2.3) | 46 (1.8) | 40 (1.6) | 44 (1.7) | 49 (1.9) | 42 (1.7) | 585 (23.0) |
Source: Stringmeteo.com Retrieved on 30 March 2013.

== Municipality ==
Ihtiman is also the seat of Ihtiman municipality (part of Sofia Province), which includes the following 27 villages:

- Balyovtsi
- Belitsa
- Boeritsa
- Borika
- Buzyakovtsi
- Bardo
- Chernyovo
- Dzhamuzovtsi
- Grozdyovtsi
- Kostadinkino
- Lyubnitsa
- Mechkovtsi
- Mirovo
- Muhovo
- Panovtsi
- Paunovo
- Polyantsi
- Popovtsi
- Razhana
- Selyanin
- Sredishtna
- Stambolovo
- Suevtsi
- Vakarel
- Venkovets
- Verinsko
- Zhivkovo

== Twin-towns ==
- Russia Klimovsk
- Portugal Ílhavo
