= Gelemenovo =

Gelemenovo Черногорово
- Village
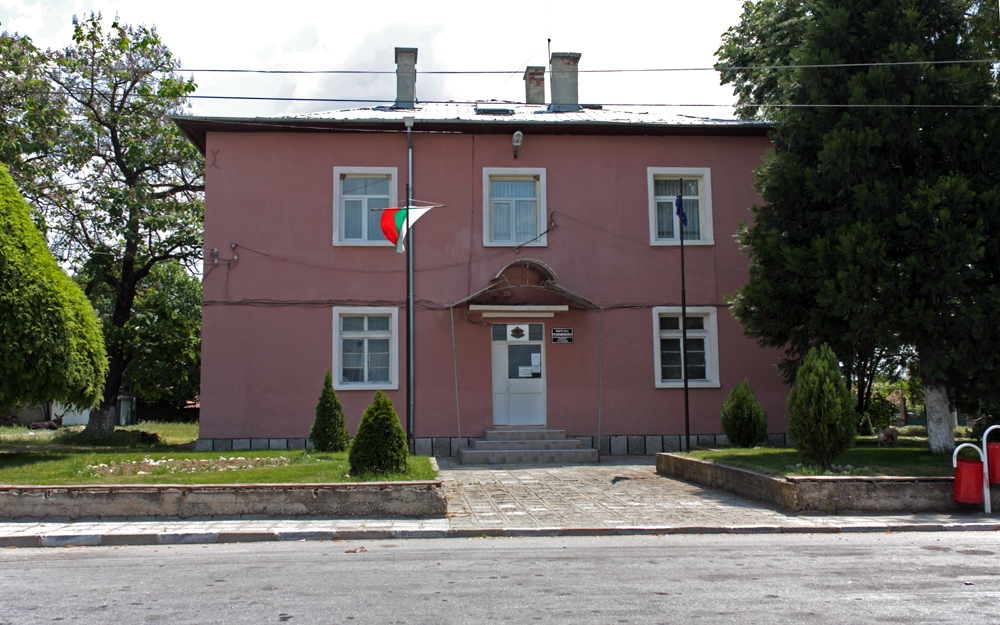

- Location within Bulgaria
- Coordinates: 42°16′N 24°19′E
- Country: Bulgaria
- Oblast: Pazardzhik
- Opština: Pazardzhik

Area
  - Total: 15.754 km^{2} (6.083 sq mi)
- Elevation: 234 m (768 ft)

Population (2024)
  - Total: 707
  - Density: 44.9/km^{2} (116/sq mi)
- Postal code: 4444
- Area code: 03522
- Vehicle registration: РА

Gelemenovo (Bulgarian: Гелеменово) is a village in Pazardzhik Municipality, Pazardzhik Province, southern Bulgaria. As of 2024 the population is 707.

== Geography ==
Gelemenovo is situated at an altitude of 240 m in a hilly area in the western part of the Upper Thracian Plain between the small rivers Elshishka reka and Telkidere, which merge south of the village and then flow into the Maritsa of the Aegean Sea basin. Through its southern outskirts runs an irrigation channel from the river Topolnitsa. The village falls within the transitional continental climatic zone. The soils are smolnitsi and cinnamon forest soils.

Administratively, Gelemenovo is located in Pazardzhik Municipality in the central part Pazardzhik Province and has a territory of 15.754 km^{2}. It lies some 8 km north of the provincial seat, the city Pazardzhik. The closest settlements are the villages of Apriltsi to the north, Chernogorovo and Krali Marko to the east, Saraya to the south, and Yunatsite to the southwest. The village is located at the junction between the Trakiya motorway and the second class II-37 road.

== Culture ==
The village was first mentioned in Ottoman documents of 1689. The local school was established immediately after the Liberation of Bulgaria in 1878. There are a medical center and a church. The village cultural center, known in Bulgarian as a chitalishte, was established in 1927 and was named "Narodna Mladezh", meaning People's Youth. It maintains a library and a folklore group.

== Economy ==
The village lies in a fertile agricultural area. Crops include grain, vegetables and fruits. Livestock breeding is also developed. There is an anti-hail installation near the village with disperses the hail-clouds in the summer with special missiles.

== Gallery ==
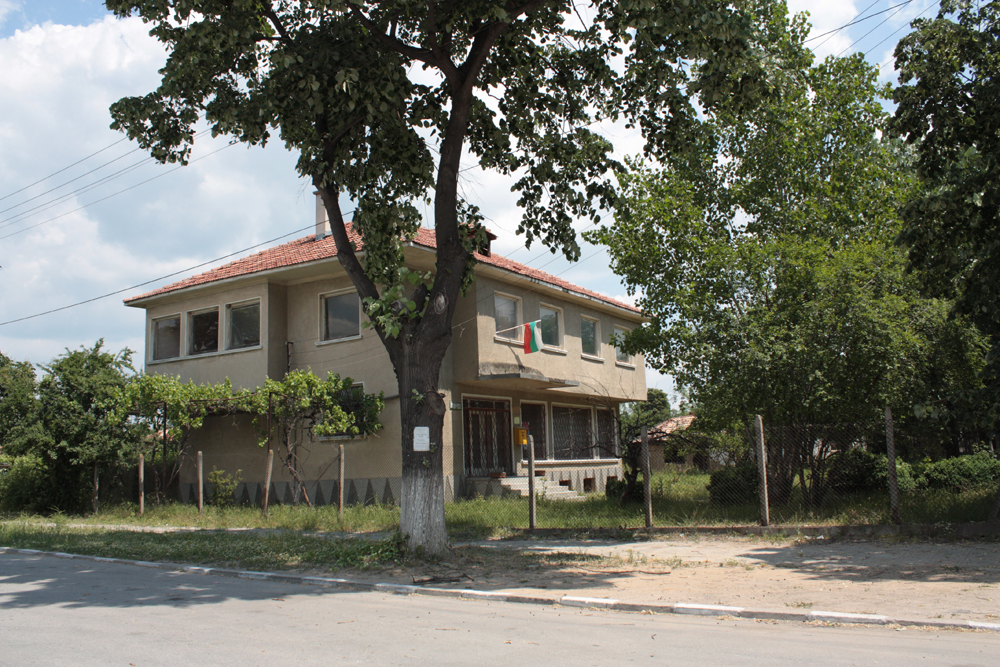
Gelemenovo Post office

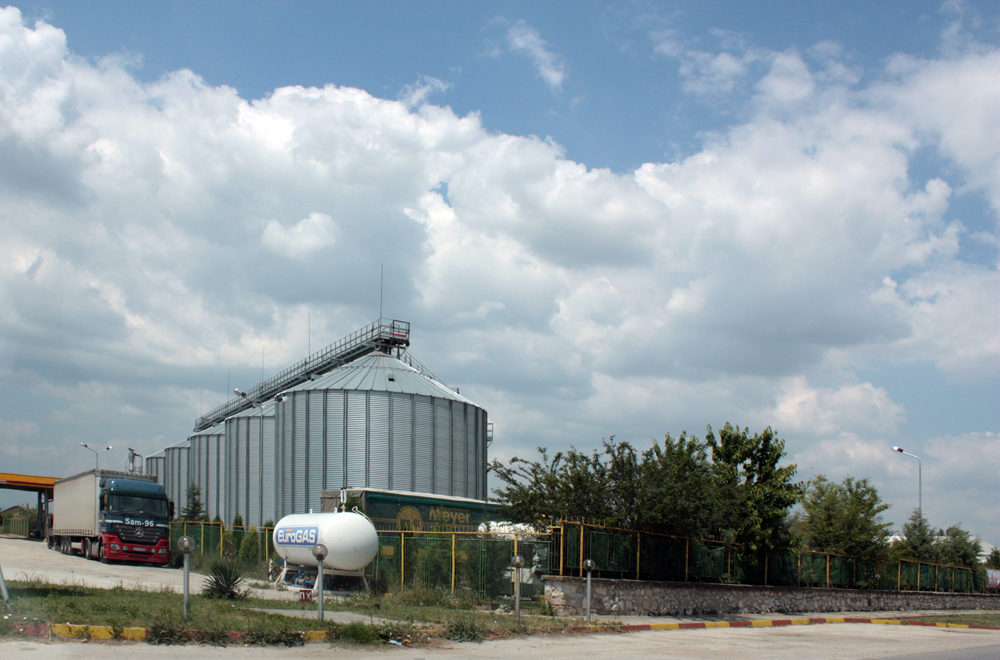
Rice mill in Gelemenovo

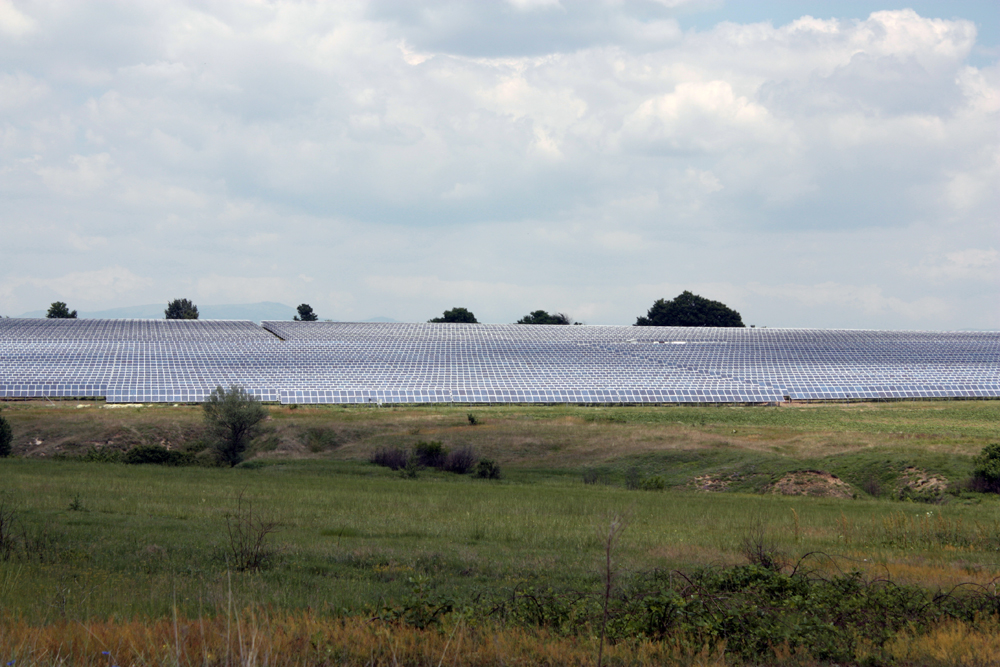
Photovoltaic power station near Gelemenovo
