= Pishtigovo =

Pishtigovo Пищигово
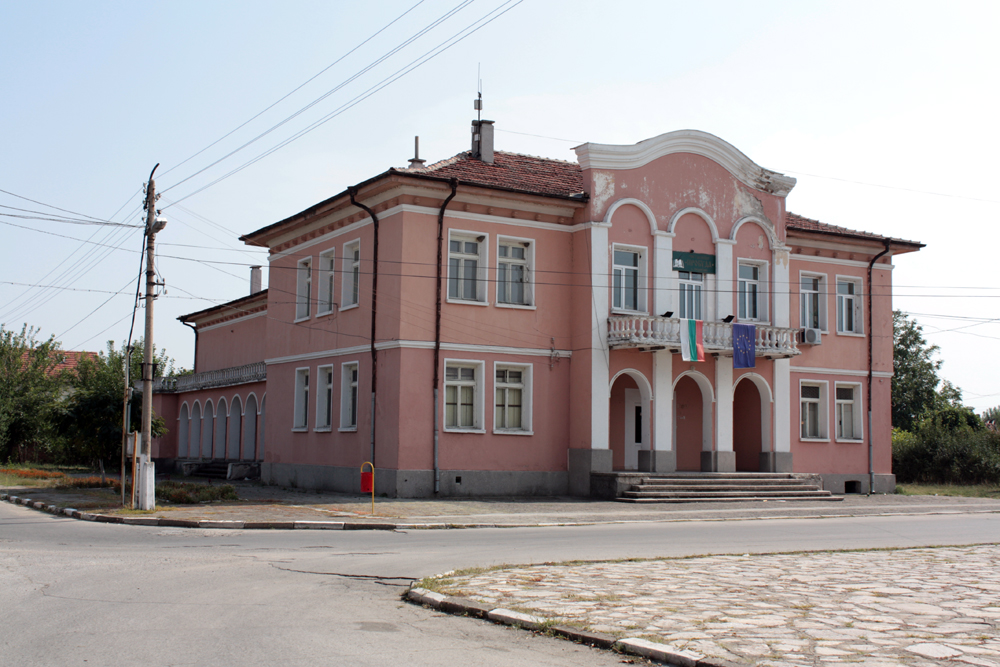
- Chitalishte "Probuda"

- Location of Pishtigovo, Bulgaria
- Coordinates: 42°15′2.69″N 24°25′35.18″E
- Country: Bulgaria
- Provinces (Oblast): Pazardzhik Province

Government
  - Mayor: Zhoro Panchev
- Elevation: 224 m (735 ft)

Population (15.09.2022)
  - Total: 911
- Time zone: UTC+2 (EET)
  - Summer (DST): UTC+3 (EEST)
- Postal Code: 4495
- Area codes: 03514 from Bulgaria, 003593514 from outside

Pishtigovo (Bulgarian: Пищигово) is a village in southern Bulgaria. It has a population of 911 as of 2022.

== Geography ==
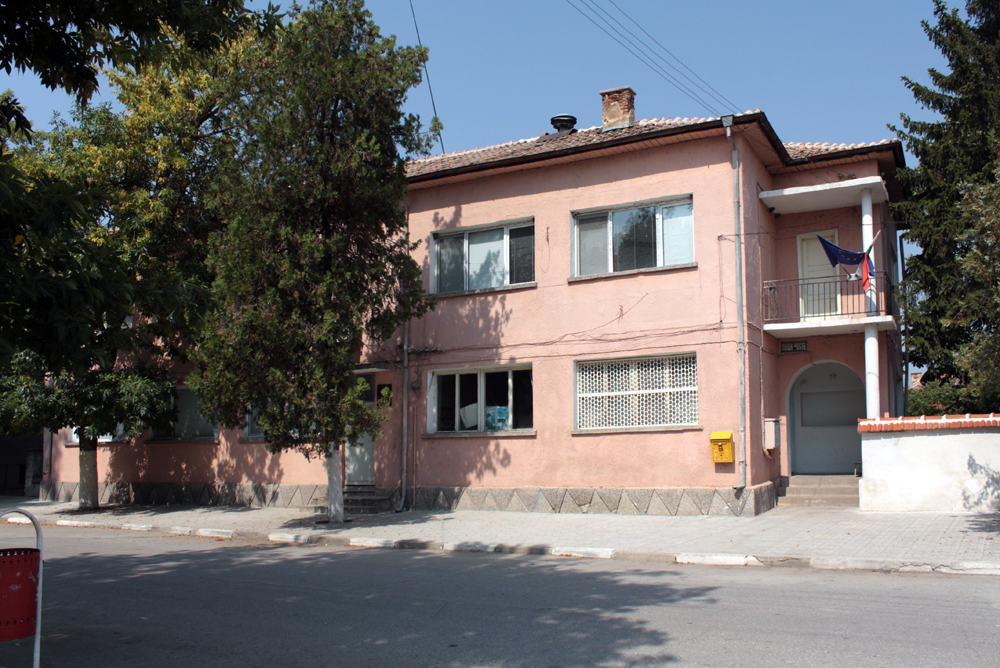
The town hall of Pishtigovo

Pishtigovo is located in central Pazardzhik Province and has a territory of 30.168 km^{2}. It is part of Pazardzhik Municipality; it used to belong to Chernogorovo Municipality, which was integrated in Pazardzhik Municipality in 1987. The distance between Pishtigovo and the municipal center Pazardzhik to the southwest is 12 km. It lies just north of the Trakia motorway and has direct road connections with the neighbouring villages of Chernogorovo to the northwest, Dobrovnitsa to the southwest and Malo Konare to the south, as well as to the town of Saedinenie to the east. About a kilometer to the west is the small village of Krali Marko, accessible by road via Chernogorovo.

Pishtigovo is situated in the western part of the Upper Thracian Plain, at 500 m from the river Luda Yana of the Maritsa drainage. It falls within the transitional continental climatic zone. The soils are chernozem, alluvial and cinnamon forest.

== History and culture ==
The village was first mentioned in Ottoman registers of 1576. It was destroyed during the Russo-Turkish War of 1877–1878, which led to the Liberation of Bulgaria. The Church of St Demetrius was constructed in 1865. The first dedicated school building was constructed shortly after the Liberation of Bulgaria in 1878 and burned down in a fire in 1914. The current school building was built in 1922. The chitalishte "Probuda" was established in 1929.

== Economy ==
The village lies in a fertile agricultural area, irrigated via a system of channels fed by the Topolnitsa Reservoir in Sredna Gora to the north and Batak Reservoir in the Rhodope Mountains to the south. Crops include rice, wheat, grapes, sour cherries, vegetables, including early tomatoes. Livestock breeding is also developed, mainly sheep, pigs and cattle. There is also a textiles workshop.
