= Rosen, Pazardzhik Province =

Rosen Росен
- Location of Rosen, Bulgaria
- Coordinates: 42°18′58.56″N 24°21′51.82″E
- Country: Bulgaria
- Provinces (Oblast): Pazardzhik Province

Government
  - Mayor: Vasil Rangelov
- Elevation: 540 m (1,770 ft)

Population (15.09.2022)
  - Total: 911
- Time zone: UTC+2 (EET)
  - Summer (DST): UTC+3 (EEST)
- Postal Code: 4421
- Area codes: 035255 from Bulgaria, 0035935255 from outside

Rosen (Bulgarian: Росен) is a village in southern Bulgaria. It has a population of 540 as of 2022.

== Geography ==
Rosen is located in central Pazardzhik Province and has a territory of 20.867 km^{2}. It is part of Pazardzhik Municipality. The distance between Rosen and the municipal center Pazardzhik to the south is 18 km. It has direct road connections with the neighbouring villages of Tsar Asen to the north and Chernogorovo to the south. The closest village is Ovchepoltsi to the northeast, accessible by road via Chernogorovo. Rosen is situated in a small hilly area of the western part of the Upper Thracian Plain, called Ovchite Hills. It lies on the left banks of the river Luda Yana.

== Economy ==
Rose lies in a fertile agricultural area. It supports diverse livestock breeding and grain production.
