= Banya, Pazardzhik Province =

Banya Баня
- Village
- Location of Banya
- Coordinates: 42°27′N 24°9′E
- Country: Bulgaria
- Provinces: Pazardzhik Province
- Municipality: Panagyurishte Municipality

Government
  - Mayor: Ivan Prodanov (Ind.)

Area
  - Total: 34.017 km^{2} (13.134 sq mi)
- Elevation: 520 m (1,710 ft)

Population (2007-01-01)
  - Total: 856
  - Density: 25.2/km^{2} (65.2/sq mi)
- Time zone: UTC+2 (EET)
  - Summer (DST): UTC+3 (EEST)
- Postal Code: 4523

Banya (Bulgarian: Баня) is a village in the Panagyurishte Municipality, Bulgaria. As of 2007 it has 856 inhabitants. The village is known throughout the region with its mineral baths and its spa resort. The ruins of an ancient fortress are located 3 km to the south.

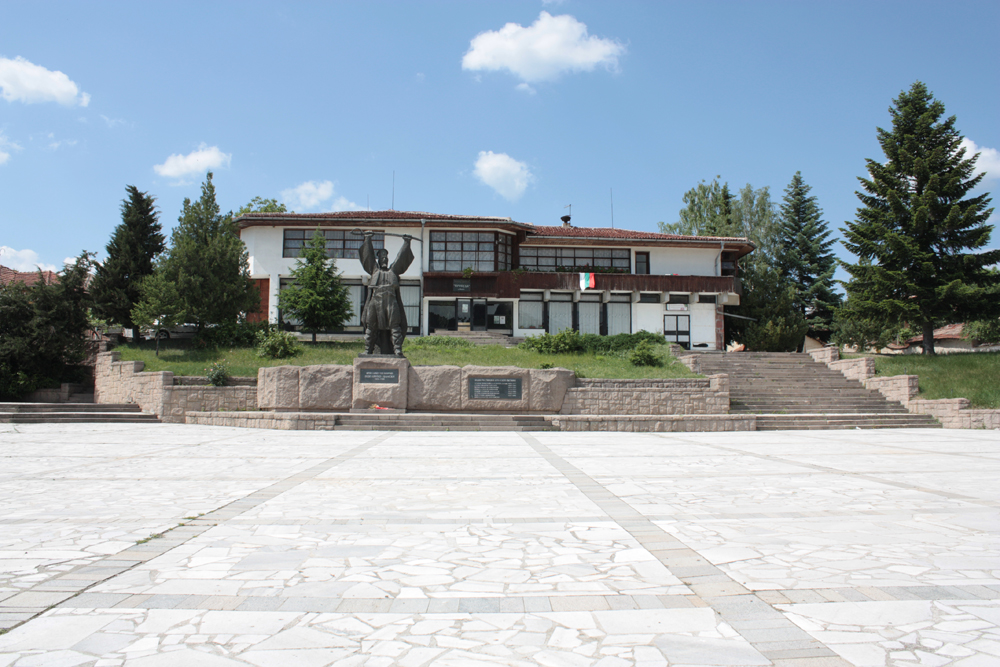
Banya center with the Monument to the fighters for national liberation and the Culture club

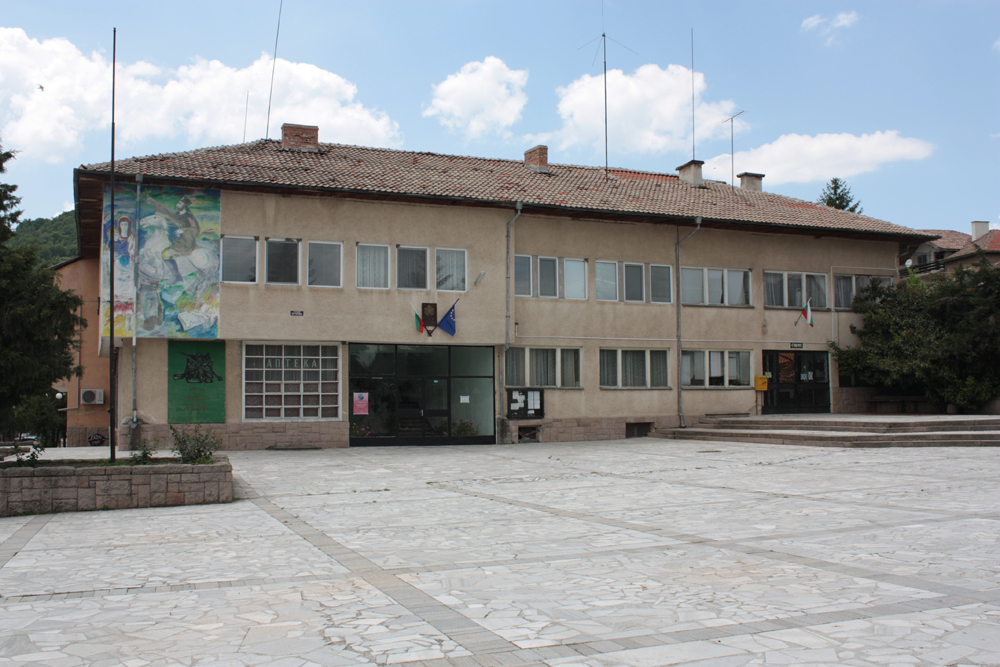
The Municipality and the Post office

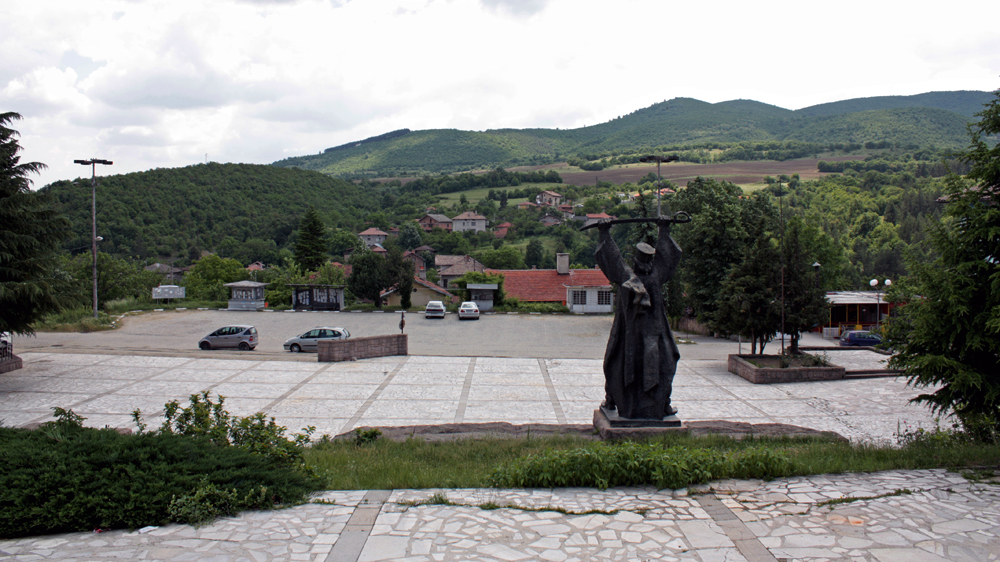
A view to the central square from the Culture club

== Geography ==
The village of Banya is situated in a mountainous region. It lies in the Sredna Gora mountain, in the Bata-Banya valley. The river Banska Luda Yana runs through the village and flows into the Panagyurska Luda Yana downstream. The closest settlements are the town of Panagyurishte, which is the centre of the municipality at 11 km and the village of Bata at 5 km. Bukova Mogila Peak (974 m) is located to the south-west.

The village has been inhabited since the time of the Thracians. A tomb of a Thracian ruler has been discovered and the artifacts can be seen in the Village Hall. Banya was the birthplace of one of the most charismatic figures in the April Uprising, the priest Gruyo Banski and his followers Atanas Kaloyanov and Stoyan Karoleev.

There are chitalishte, library, kindergarten and school. Banya has several recreation facilities with its mineral springs, outdoor and indoor pools, hotel, restaurants and pub. The population is Christian Orthodox, there are two churches and a small chapel with frescoes.

== Culture and landmarks ==
A monument of Gruyo Banki has been erected in the centre of the village. His house is converted to a small museum. There is a path leading to the locality Kalato where there are remains of a Roman fortress. It was used as a refuge by the local population during the Ottoman rule. The surroundings of the village are dominated by old oak and beech forests and hundreds of decares of orchards, mainly sour cherry and plum.

=== Regular events ===
- Todorovden
- Sveta Troitsa (Trinity Sunday)
- Pluven Den (Swimming Day)
