= Chernogorovo, Pazardzhik Province =

Chernogorovo Черногорово
- Village
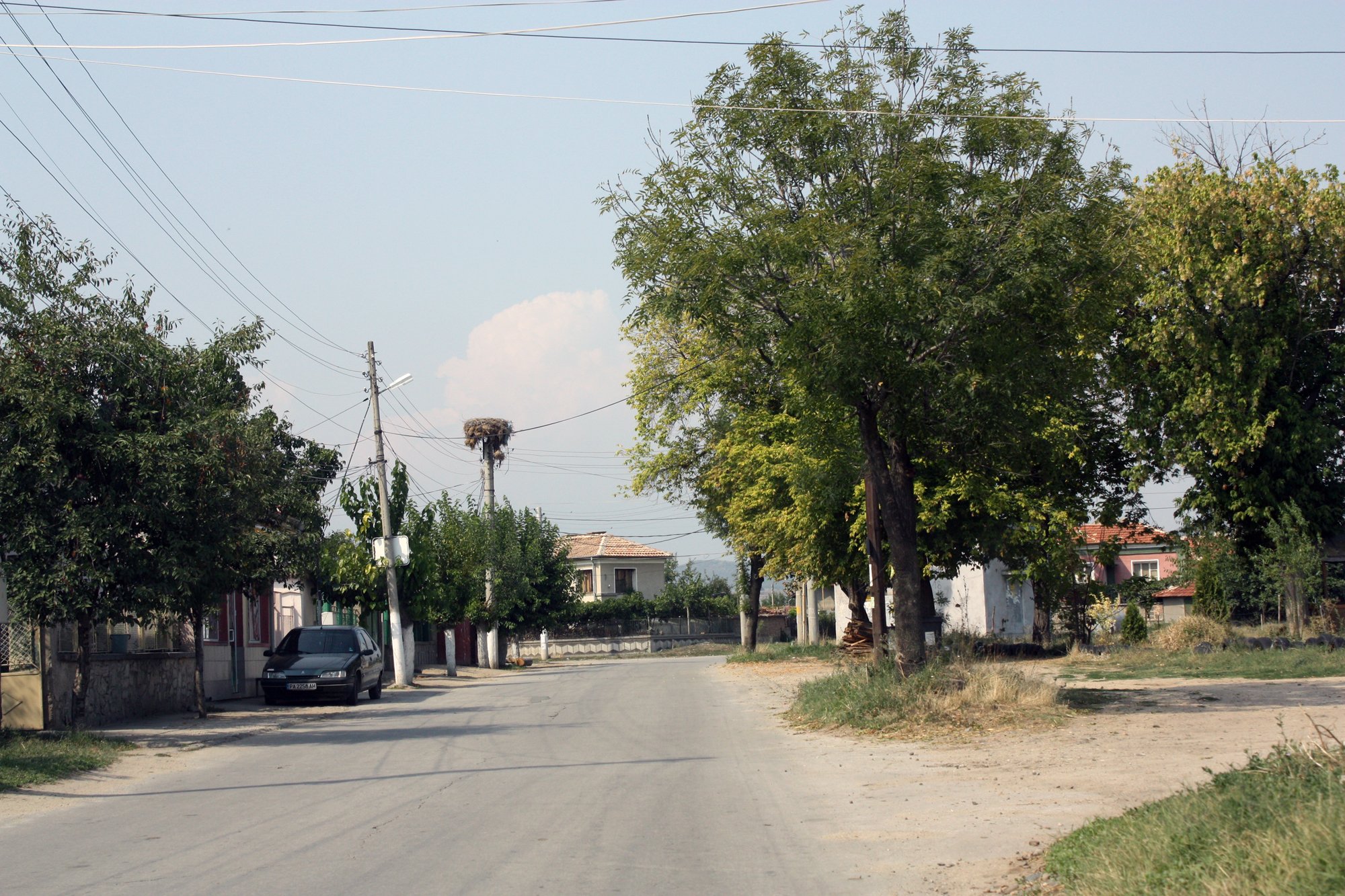

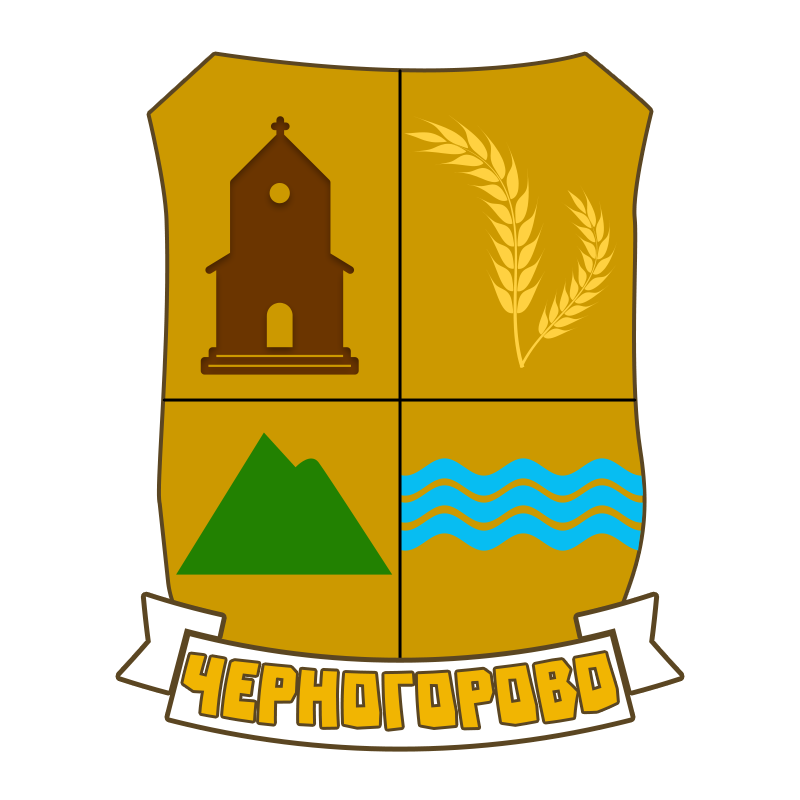
- Flag

- Location within Bulgaria
- Coordinates: 42°16′19.21″N 24°24′3.97″E
- Country: Bulgaria
- Oblast: Pazardzhik
- Opština: Pazardzhik

Government
  - Mayor (Municipality): Petar Kulenski (PP)
  - Mayor (Town Hall): Dimitar Vrinchev (BSP)

Area
  - Total: 47.067 km^{2} (18.173 sq mi)
- Elevation: 241 m (791 ft)

Population (2024)
  - Total: 1,908
  - Density: 40.54/km^{2} (105.0/sq mi)
- Postal code: 4455
- Area code: 03514
- Vehicle registration: РА

Chernogorovo (Bulgarian: Черногорово) is a large village in Pazardzhik Province, southern Bulgaria. As of 2024 the population is 1,908.

== Geography ==
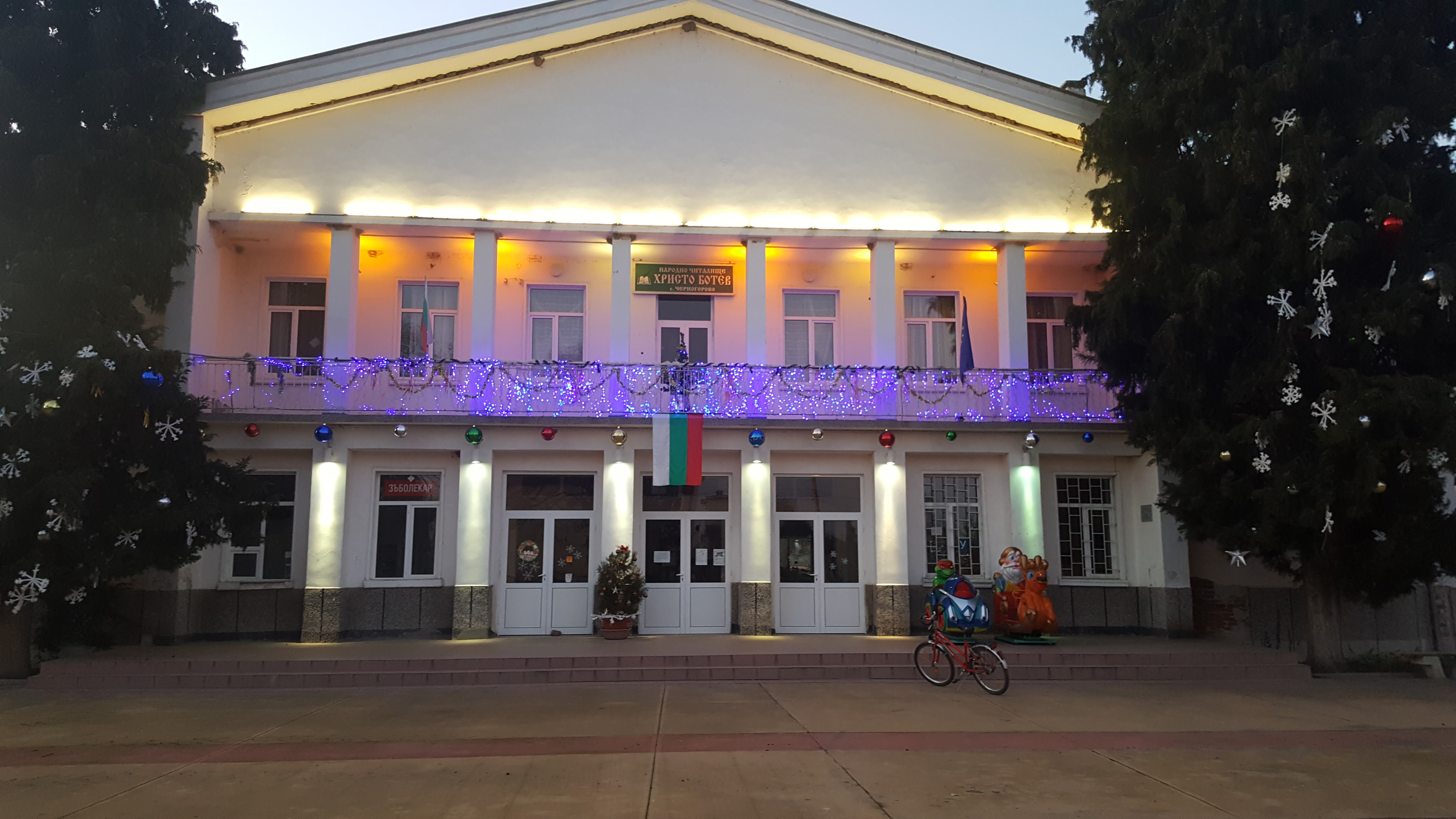
The chitalishte of Chernogorovo

The village is situated in the Upper Thracian Plain in the southern part of a small hilly area called Ovchite Hills. It lies on the left bank of the river Luda Yana, a tributary of the Maritsa of the Aegean Sea basin.

Administratively, Chernogorovo is part of Pazardzhik Municipality, located in the central part of Pazardzhik Province. It has a territory of 47.067 km^{2}. It is accessible via the second class III-8003 road and several smaller rural roads and is very close to the Trakiya motorway. It is located some 11 km northeast of the provincial center Pazardzhik, 15 km west of the town of Saedinenie and 35 km northwest of the major city of Plovdiv. The nearest villages are Rosen to the northwest, Ovchepoltsi to the north, Krali Marko, to the south and Pishtigovo to the southeast.

== Culture and Economy ==
The Church of St Charalambos was constructed in the period between 1848 and 1850; its icons are dated from 1859. The school of Chernogorovo was founded in 1850 and in 1938 was moved to the current edifice. The local cultural center, known in Bulgarian as a chitalishte, was established in 1928 and was named after the Bulgarian national hero and poet Hristo Botev. The current edifice was constructed in 1958–1960. The chitalishte has a library and maintains a local amateur folklore group.

Chernogorovo lies in a rich agricultural area and has a well-developed agriculture. The main crops include many varieties of cereals, orchards and vegetables. Livestock breeding is also developed. There is an airfield situated some two kilometers to the northeast.
