= Sabor (disambiguation) =

Sabor is the common name in Croatian for the Croatian Parliament.

Sabor may also refer to:

- Sabor (restaurant), in London
- Sabor (Tarzan), a fictional animal character from the Tarzan novels of Edgar Rice Burroughs
- Sabor line (Linha do Sabor), a narrow gauge railway in Portugal which closed in 1988
- Sabor River, a river in north-east Portugal (a tributary of the river Douro)
- Bishops' Council of the Serbian Orthodox Church (Serbian: Sveti arhijerejski sabor), the highest organizational unit of the Serb Orthodox Church
- Diet of Bosnia (Bosanski sabor), a former political body in Bosnia and Herzegovina
- Diet of Dalmatia (Dalmatinski sabor), a former legislative assembly in Dalmatia

== See also ==
- Sbor (disambiguation)
- Saborna crkva (disambiguation), Cathedral churches in the Serb Orthodoxy
