= Novo Selo, Vidin Province =

Novo Selo Ново село
- Village
- Seal

- Location within Bulgaria
- Coordinates: 44.0160546°N 22.8068367°E
- Country: Bulgaria
- Province: Vidin Province
- Municipality: Novo Selo

Government
  - Mayor: Georgi Stoenelov
- Elevation: 44 m (144 ft)

Population (2017)
  - Total: ▼970
- Time zone: UTC+2 (EET)
  - Summer (DST): UTC+3 (EEST)

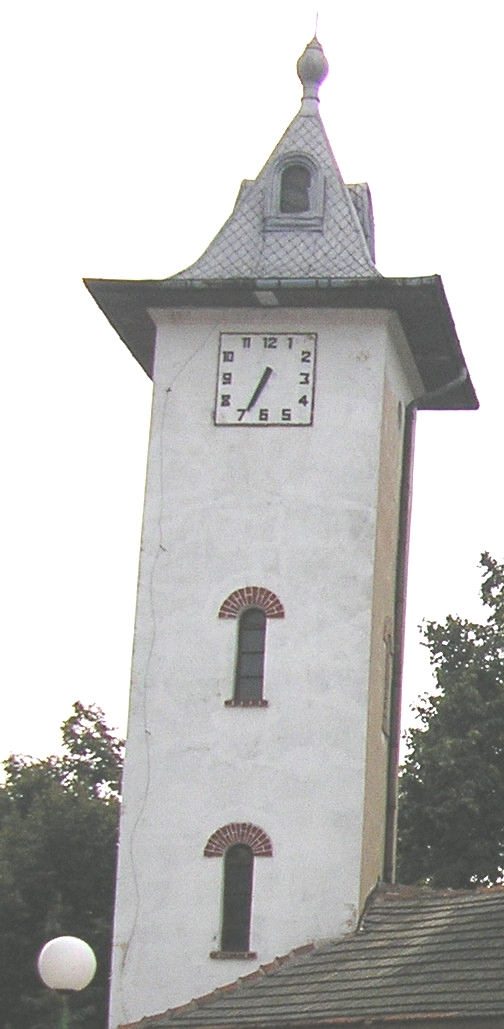
The clock tower, a symbol of Novo Selo

Novo Selo (Bulgarian: Ново село, lit. 'New village'; Romanian: Novosăl) is a village in northwesternmost Bulgaria, part of Vidin Province. It lies on the right (south) bank of the Danube and is the administrative centre of a municipality with the same name.

As of December 2017 Novo Selo has a population of 970 and the mayor is Georgi Stoenelov. It lies at 44°10′N 22°47′E, 45 m above sea level. The village is located 25 km north-northwest of the provincial centre Vidin and 12 km east of the Serbian border at the Timok River mouth, with Mehedinți County of Romania directly across the Danube to the north. The main occupation in Novo Selo is vine growing.

According to the travel notes of the Italian traveller Count Luigi Ferdinando Marsigli, the village was founded around 1700 and was initially named Prosǎnǎc (Просънъц). Due to the plague and a fire the villagers abandoned the village only for their descendants to return in 1772 to found the modern Novo Selo. After the Crimean War a local government was set up and a knez (mayor) and councillors were elected.

Following the Liberation of Bulgaria in 1878 Novo Selo became part of Vidin District, and has since 1 January 1979 been the seat of a municipality also including the villages of Florentin, Negovanovtsi, Vinarovo and Yasen.

The construction of the Bulgarian Orthodox Church of St Nicholas in the village, a cultural monument, began in 1825, during the Ottoman era. The bells were shipped from Pest, Austria-Hungary. The Zemedelets chitalishte (community centre) was built in 1930; it is also a memorial to all locals who perished in the wars. The Cyril and Methodius School dates to 1939. Another landmark is the characteristic clock tower from 1931, which is a symbol of Novo Selo. Novo Selo also has a small river port, a beach and an orphanage.

Novo Selo is also known for its typical vernacular, sharing features with the Serbian dialects to the west and the Torlakian vernacular to the south, as well as showing lexical influences from Romanian. Novo Selo's motto, in the local vernacular, is Mi smo si mi (Ми смо си ми), "We are (just) ourselves".

== Population ==
As of December 2017 Novo Selo has a population of 970 people, down from its peak of 4,535 people in 1934. Most inhabitants are ethnic Bulgarians (93%), with a large "Vlach" (Romanian) minority (who declared themselves as Bulgarians) and a few Romani people (7%). An overwhelming majority of the population of the village identify themselves as Christians (95%). Most inhabitants identified as Orthodox Christians belonging to the Bulgarian Orthodox Church.

The Bulgarian language spoken in Novo Selo has many similarities with the neighbouring Serbian language and Romanian language.

== Gallery ==
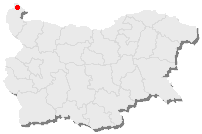
Location in Bulgaria

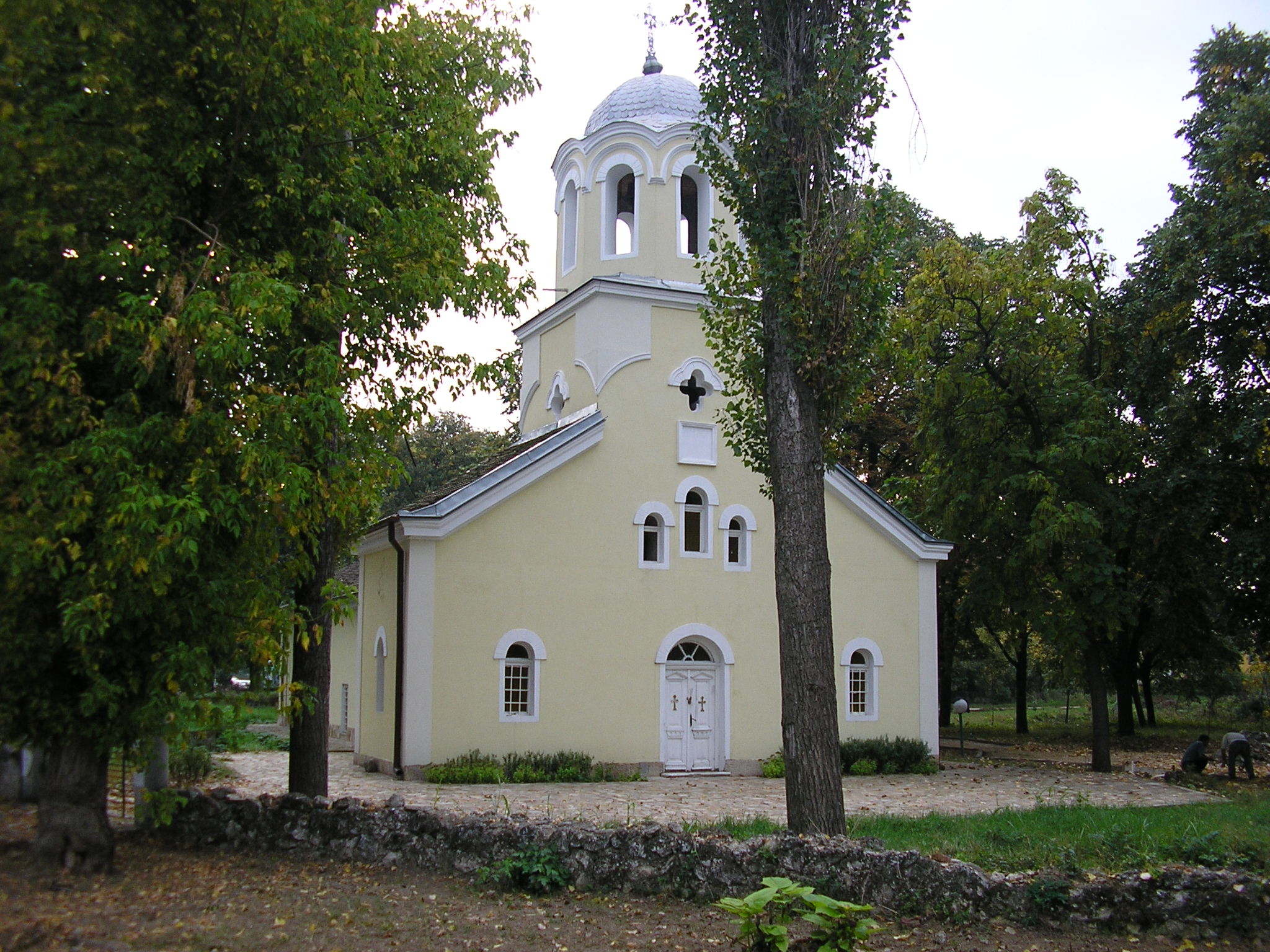
The Church of St Nikola

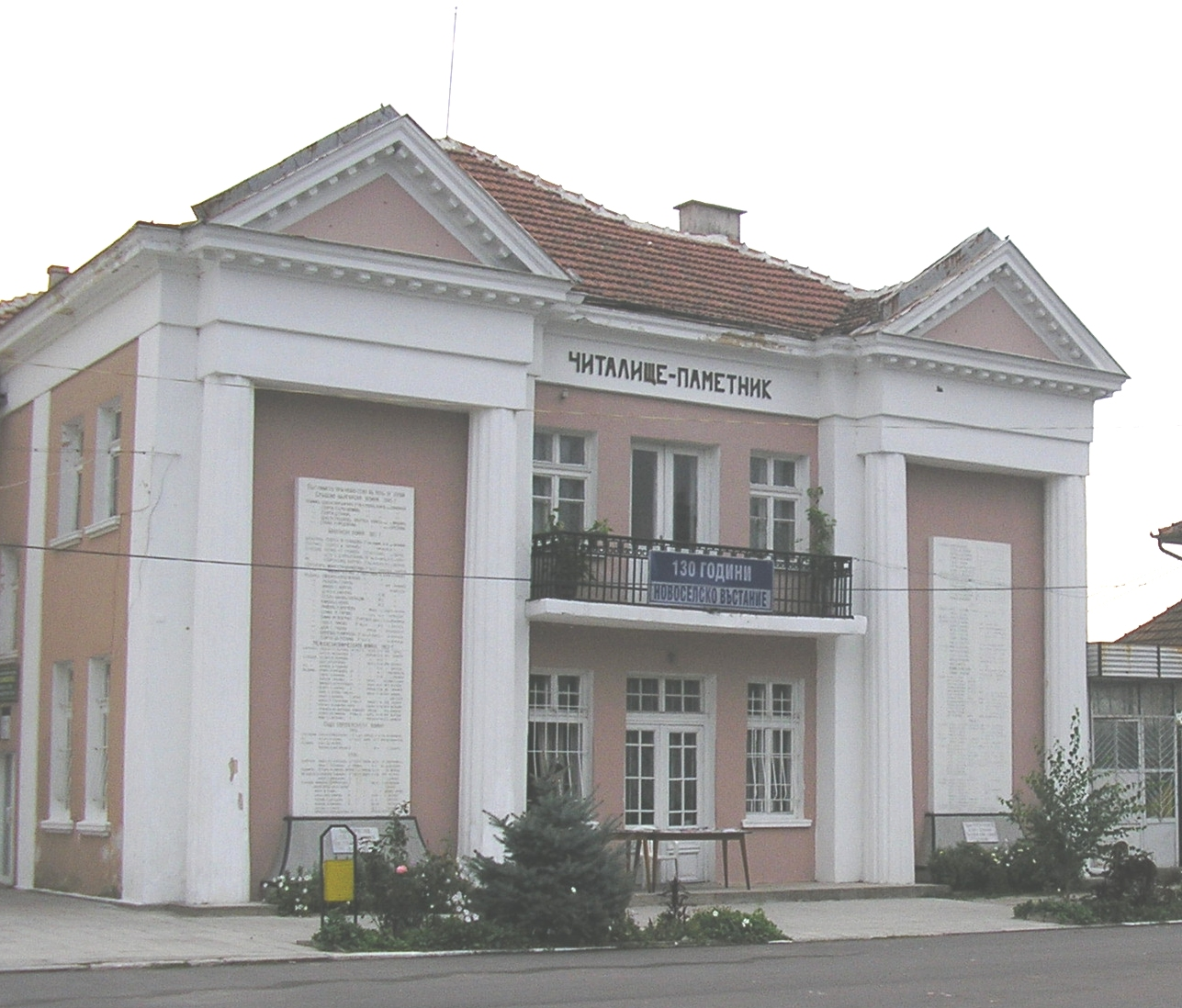
The community centre

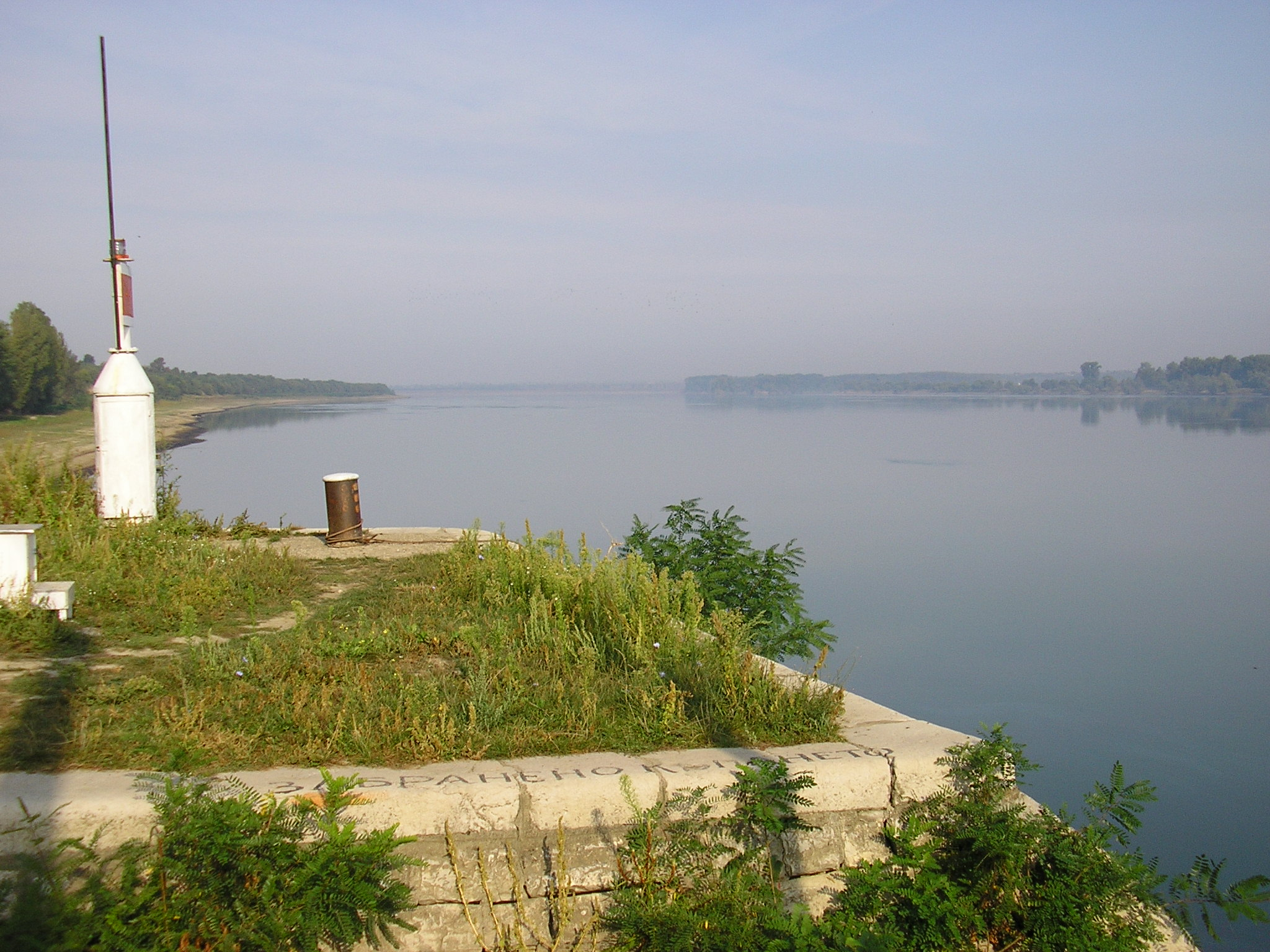
View of the Danube from Novo Selo

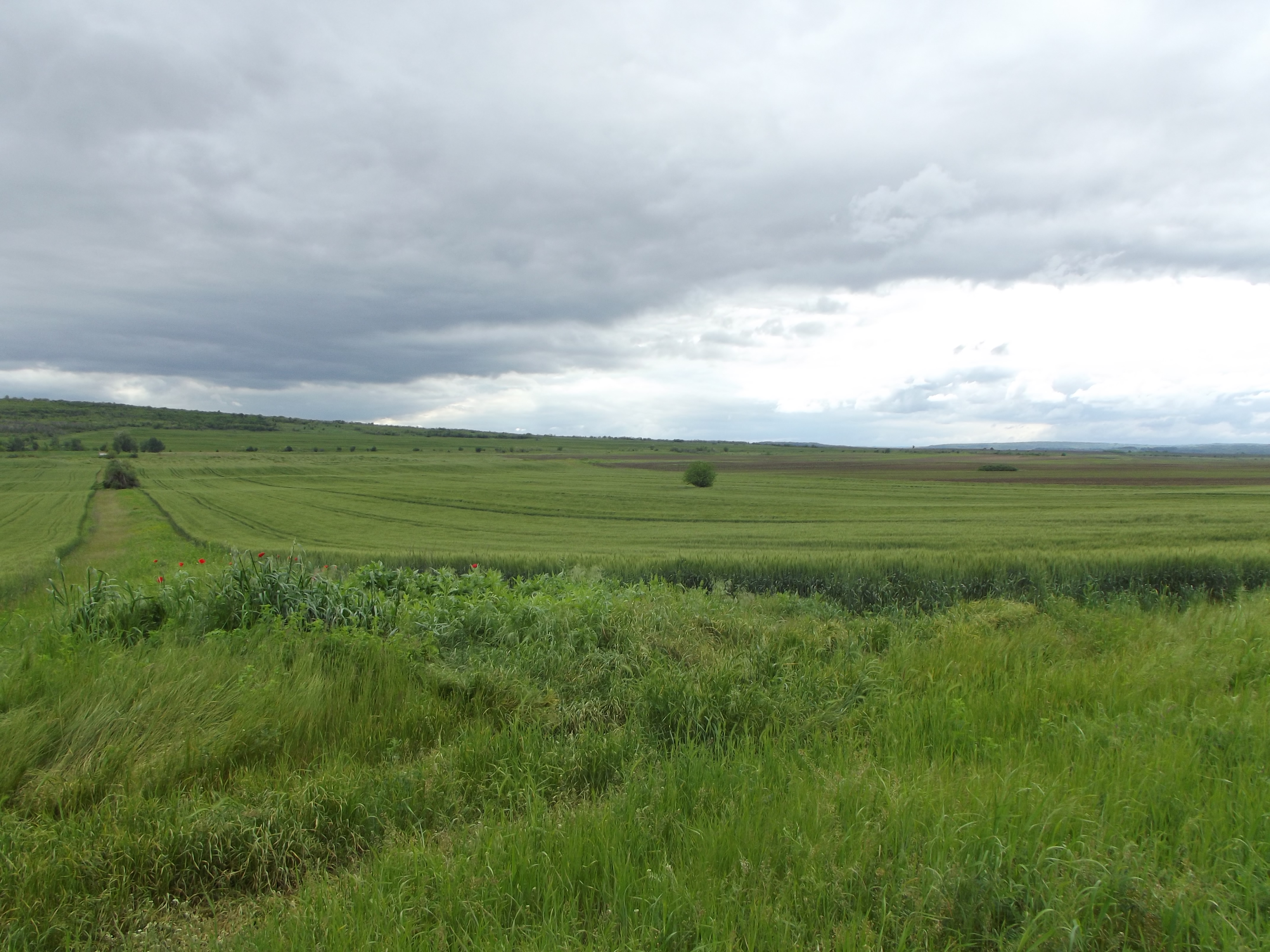
Field in Novo Selo

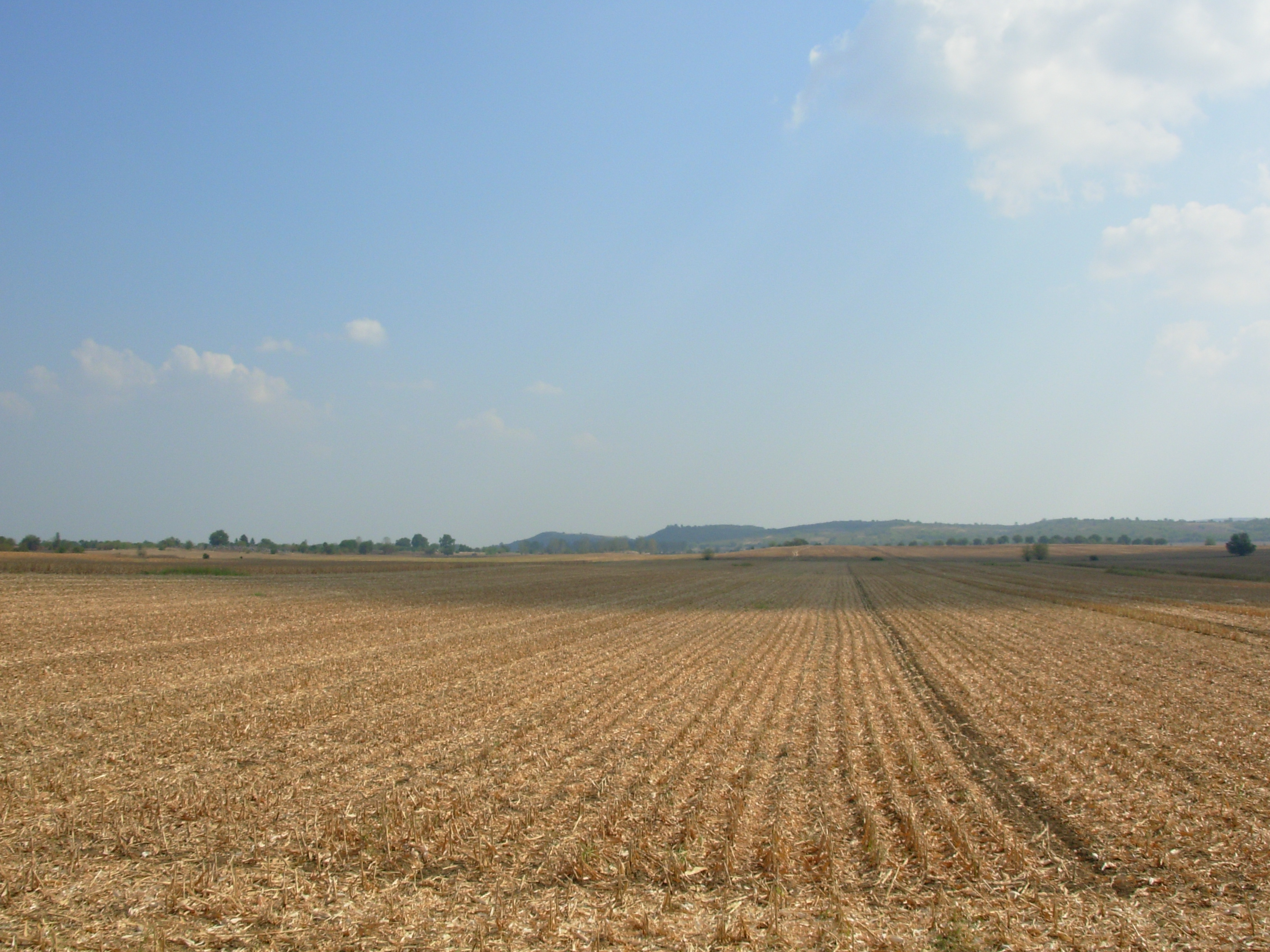
Field in Novo Selo
