= Luda Yana =

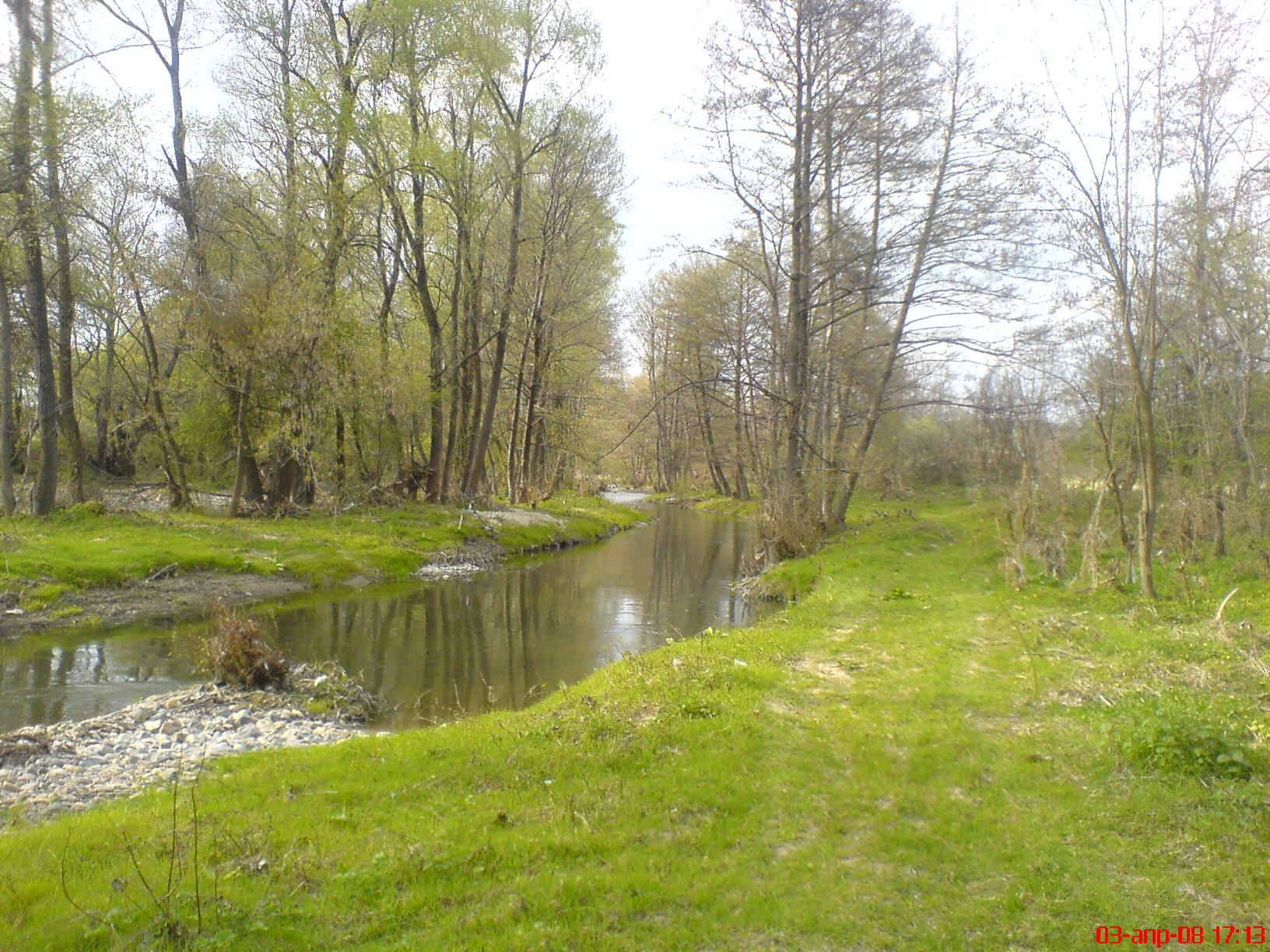

Location
- Country: Bulgaria

Physical characteristics
- Source
  - location: SW of Bich, Sredna Gora
  - coordinates: 42°37′0.12″N 24°17′8.88″E
  - elevation: 1,423 m (4,669 ft)
- Mouth
  - location: Maritsa
  - coordinates: 42°9′23.04″N 24°22′57″E
  - elevation: 195 m (640 ft)
- Length: 73.5 km (45.7 mi)
- Basin size: 674 km^{2} (260 sq mi)

Basin features
- Progression: Maritsa→ Aegean Sea

The Luda Yana (Bulgarian: Луда Яна, meaning "Crazy Yana") is a 74 km-long river in southern Bulgaria, a left tributary of the river Maritsa. There are several version about the river's etymology. According to geographer Pavel Deliradev, the name comes from a combination of its "crazy" flow after heavy rains and a Bulgarian maiden from the period of the Ottoman rule in Bulgaria named Yana, who according to local legend threw herself into the river rather than being forced into a marriage with a Turk. According to the linguist Stefan Mladenov, it is possible that the word "Yana" meant river in the ancient Thracian language.

The Luda Yana takes its source at an altitude of 1,423 m near the western foothills of the summit of Bich (1,449 m) in the mountain range of Sredna Gora. It flows in a southwestern direction in a deep valley and turns southwards a few kilometers upstream from the town of Panagyurishte. It then flows the eponymous valley and turns in a southeastern direction near the village of Bata. Close to the village of Rosen it enters the Upper Thracian Plain and flows in a wide sandy riverbed. It flows into the Maritsa at an altitude of 195 m north of the village of Sinitovo.

Its drainage basin covers a territory of 685 km^{2} or 1.3% of Maritsa's total and borders the drainage basins of the Topolnitsa to the north, west and southwest and the Pyasachnik and Potoka to the east, all of them left tributaries of the Maritsa.

The Luda Yana has predominantly rain-snow feed with high water in March–June and low water in July–October. The average annual flow near the village of Sbor is 3.60 m^{3}/s.

The river flows entirely in Pazardzhik Province. There are six settlements along its course: the town of Panagyurishte and the village of Popintsi in Panagyurishte Municipality and the villages of Rosen, Chernogorovo, Krali Marko and Pishtigovo in Pazardzhik Municipality. A 16.4 km stretch of the second class II-37 road Yablanitsa–Pazardzhik–Dospat follows the Luda Yana between Panagyurishte and Popintsi. The river's waters are utilised for irrigation and water supply of several of Panagyurishte's major factories, including Asarel Medet and Opticoelectron.
