= Velichko Minekov =

Bulgarian sculptor (1928–2022)

Velichko Minekov (Bulgarian: Величко Минеков; 13 October 1928 – 2 August 2022) was a Bulgarian sculptor.

== Biography ==
He was born in the village of Malo Konare, Bulgaria.

Minekov is known as a visual artist for his monumental sculpture and renderings of public figure, and also for having been a member of the eighth and ninth National Assembly from 1982 to 1990.

In 1954, Minekov finished the National Academy class sculpture "Lubomir Dalchev".

He also donated a number of works to the city of Pazardzhik, where he attended primary and secondary school.

In 2008, he received a lifetime achievement award from the Ministry of Culture.

Velichko Minekov died on 2 August 2022, at the age 93 in Sofia, Bulgaria.
