= Saraya, Pazardzhik Province =

Coordinates: 42°15′N 24°19′E

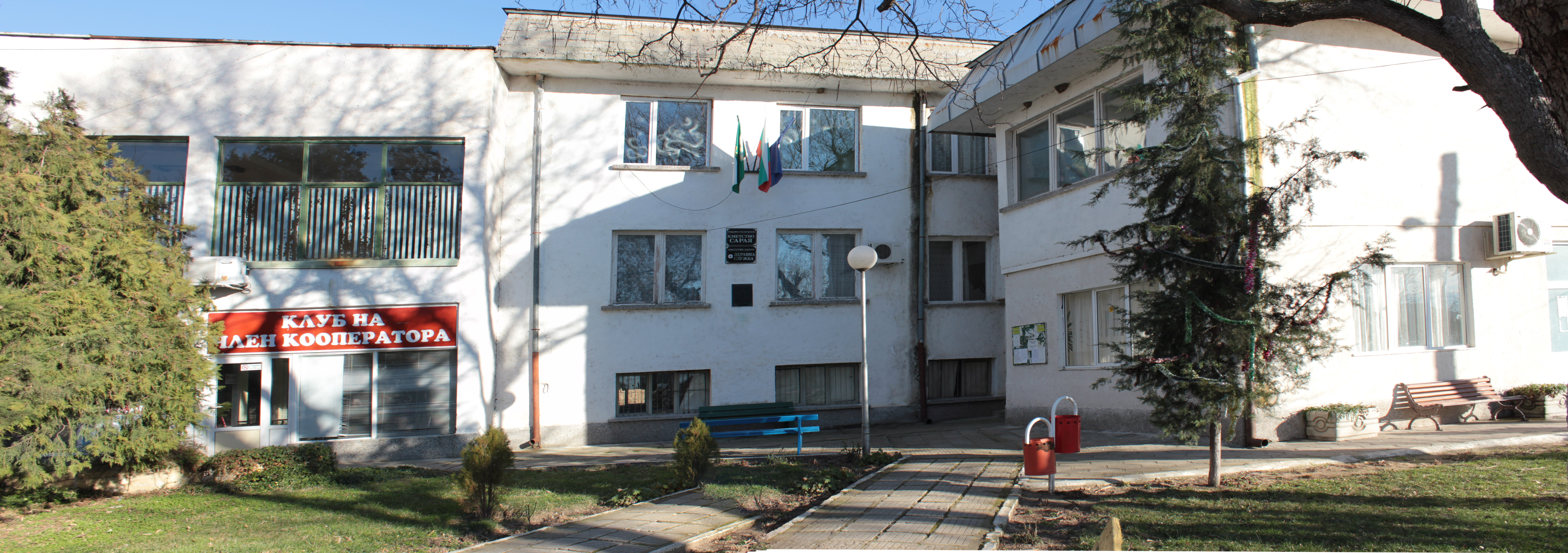
Village hall

Saraya (Bulgarian: Сарая) is a village Pazardzhik Municipality, Pazardzhik Province, southern Bulgaria. The population as of 2006 is 1,516. The village is situated very close to the Trakiya motorway near its juncture with the road Pazardzhik-Panagyurishte. The main occupation for its inhabitants is agriculture due to the favourable climatic conditions in the area. There are many glasshouses in the region in which early vegetables are grown. Stock-breeding is very important with several farms for cattle, pigs and sheep.

There is a venerable oak forest on the land close to the village. Ruins of a medieval settlement can be found in the vicinity.
