= Sbor =

Sbor may refer to the following villages of Bulgaria:

- Sbor, Kardzhali Province
- Sbor, Pazardzhik Province

== See also ==
- Sbor národní bezpečnosti, the national police of Czechoslovakia
- Zbor
