= Malo Konare =

Malo Konare Мало Конаре
- Village
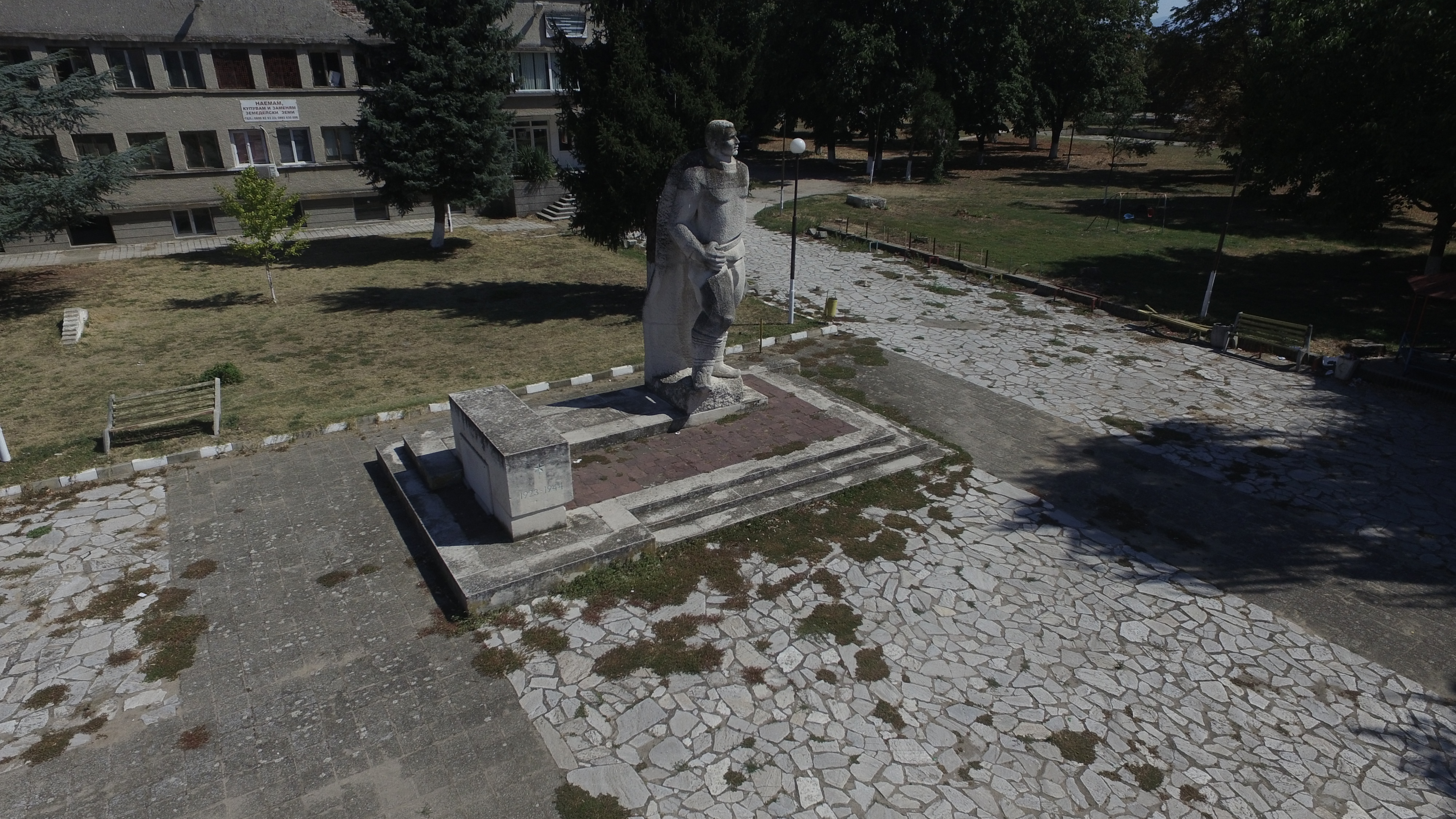

- Location within Bulgaria
- Coordinates: 42.200°N 24.433°E
- Country: Bulgaria
- Province: Pazardzhik
- Municipality: Pazardzhik

Government
  - Mayor: Magdalena Vrabcheva-Raykova (Badeshte za Rodinata)

Area
  - Total: 52.214 km^{2} (20.160 sq mi)
- Elevation: 209 m (686 ft)

Population (2024)
  - Total: 3,852
  - Density: 73.77/km^{2} (191.1/sq mi)
- Postal code: 4450
- Area code: 03513
- Vehicle registration: РА

Malo Konare (Bulgarian: Мало Конаре) is a village located in Pazardzhik Municipality, Pazardzhik Province, of southern Bulgaria. The population is 3,852 as of 2024 and is the biggest village in the municipality.

== Geography ==
Malo Konare is located in the eastern part of Pazardzhik Province and lies 8 km away from the municipal centre Pazardzhik and 106 km away from the capital Sofia. It borders Luda Yana to the west and its territory in the northwest reaches the left bank of the river. Its width is 4 km to the north, south and east. Malo Konare is located in the Upper Thracian Plain with an elevation of 209 m and is on flat terrain with the exception of some Thracian mounds which break its flat monotony. The biggest of them all is Staro Selishte which is located 4 km east from the village. The plain around the Luda Yana is slightly raised and uneven. There are oak, acacia, poplar and zelkova trees. There are many orchards on the village's territory. The land is fertile and is made up of alluvial and loess soils.

== Economy and infrastructure ==
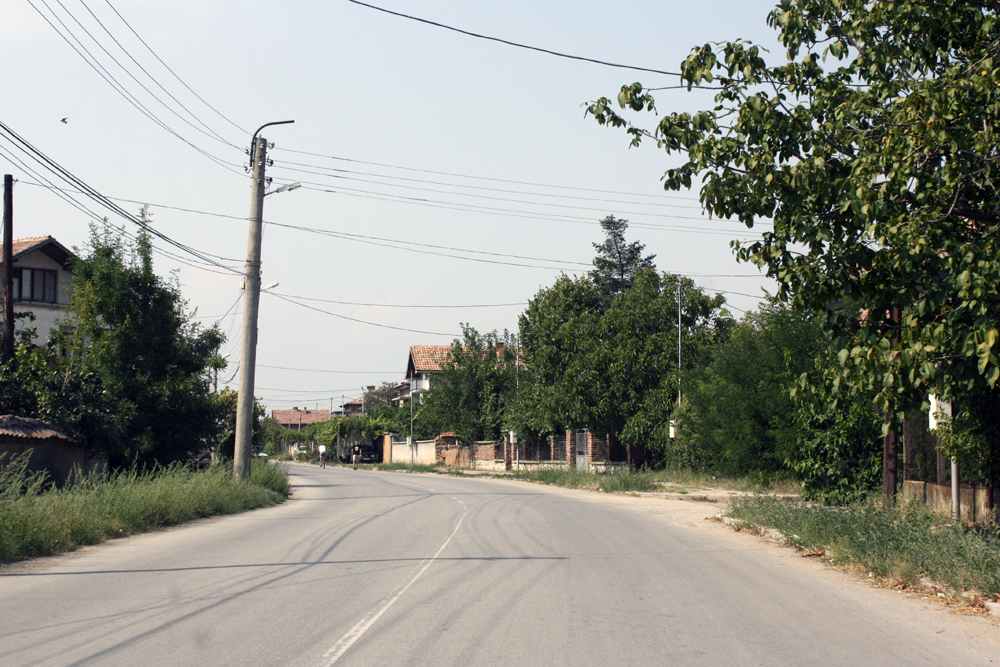
The main road in Malo Konare

Agriculture is developed in Malo Konare. Many types of fruits and vegetables are grown. There are also vineyards and orchards. Livestock breeding such as cattle, poultry and sheep is also developed. There is also a fishery.

Infrastructure is poorly developed. The water supply is made up of three class pumps. The water source is groundwater. Since 2011 there are over 1900 homes. The houses are mainly made of bricks, concrete slabs and metal joists. The village is served by the first class I-8 road the starting point of the 37 km long third class III-8003 road.

== Bibliography ==
- Great Encyclopedia Bulgaria (in Bulgarian) (7 ed.). Sofia: Trud. 2011. ISBN 978-9-54398-153-3.
- Pazardzhik Municipality (2011). Encyclopedia Pazardzhik (in Bulgarian). Pazardzhik: Belloprint. ISBN 978-954-684-308-1.
- Batakliev, Ivan (1969). Pazardzhik and Pazardzhishko (in Bulgarian). Sofia: Profizdat.
- Integrated Development Plan of Pazardzhik Municipality (PDF). Pazardzhik Municipality. 2021.
