= Novo Selo Municipality, Bulgaria =

Novo Selo Municipality Община Ново село
- Municipality
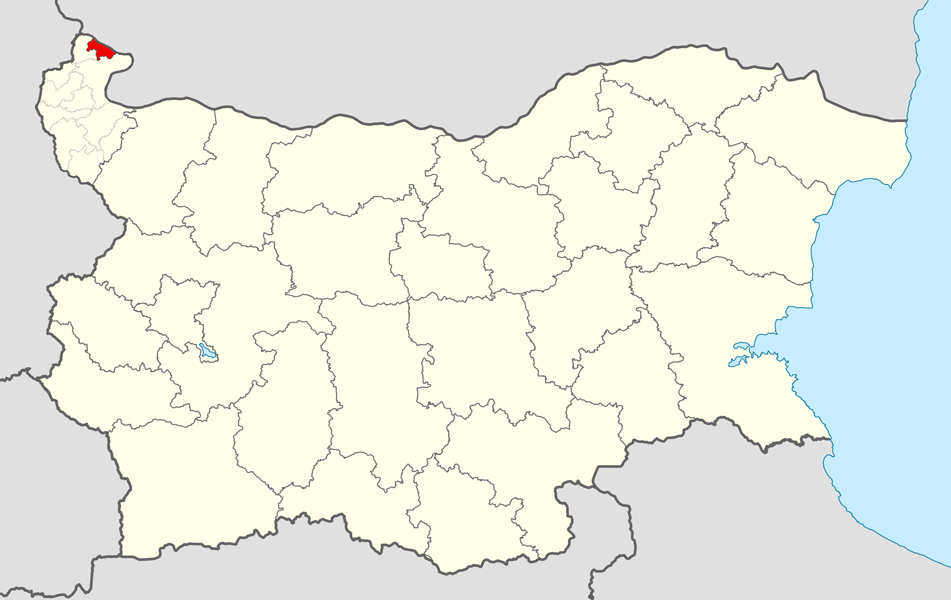
- Novo Selo Municipality within Bulgaria and Vidin Province.
- Coordinates: 44°8′N 22°47′E
- Country: Bulgaria
- Province (Oblast): Vidin
- Admin. centre (Obshtinski tsentar): Novo Selo

Area
  - Total: 109.5 km^{2} (42.3 sq mi)

Population (April 2011)
  - Total: 2,979
  - Density: 27.21/km^{2} (70.46/sq mi)
- Time zone: UTC+2 (EET)
  - Summer (DST): UTC+3 (EEST)
- Website: obshtina-novoselo.com

Novo Selo Municipality (Bulgarian: Община Ново село) is a frontier municipality (obshtina) in Vidin Province, Northwestern Bulgaria, located along the right bank of Danube river in the Danubian Plain. It is named after its administrative centre - the village of Novo Selo. The area borders on Romania beyond the Danube to the north.

The municipality embraces a territory of 109.5 km^{2} (42.3 sq mi) with a population of 2,979 inhabitants, as of the April 2011 census.

== Settlements ==
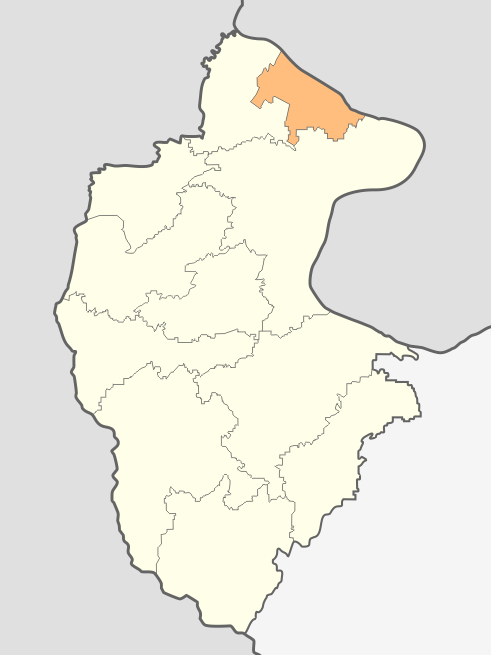
Novo Selo Municipality within Vidin Province

Novo Selo Municipality includes the following 5 places all of them villages:

| Town/Village | Cyrillic | Population |
|---|---|---|
| Novo Selo | Ново село | 1,015 |
| Florentin | Флорентин | 352 |
| Negovanovtsi | Неговановци | 398 |
| Vinarovo | Винарово | 755 |
| Yasen | Ясен | 259 |
| Total | | 2,979 |

== Demography ==
The following table shows the change of the population during the last four decades.

Novo Selo Municipality
| Year | 1975 | 1985 | 1992 | 2001 | 2005 | 2007 | 2009 | 2011 |
| Population | 7,187 | 5,753 | 5,218 | 4,206 | 3,733 | 3,588 | 3,381 | 2,979 |
Sources: Census 2001, Census 2011, „pop-stat.mashke.org“,

=== Age structure ===
The municipality of Novo Selo has a fastly ageing population. As of December 2018 the share of elderly people (aged 65+) reached 43.4%, up from 41.7% in 2011. The share of children aged up to 14 years old declined from 8.6% tot 8.4% in the same period.

Age structure of Novo Selo Municipality
| Year | Population | 0–4 | 5–9 | 10–14 | 15–19 | 20–24 | 25–29 | 30–34 | 35–39 | 40–44 | 45–49 | 50–54 | 55–59 | 60–64 | 65–69 | 70–74 | 75–79 | 80+ |
|---|---|---|---|---|---|---|---|---|---|---|---|---|---|---|---|---|---|---|
| February 2011 | 2,979 | 61 | 102 | 93 | 88 | 104 | 82 | 132 | 111 | 127 | 139 | 151 | 219 | 327 | 342 | 301 | 285 | 315 |
| December 2016 | 2,691 | 73 | 63 | 97 | 103 | 81 | 96 | 98 | 119 | 120 | 149 | 148 | 152 | 225 | 303 | 314 | 232 | 318 |
| December 2017 | 2,593 | 64 | 61 | 96 | 113 | 75 | 97 | 91 | 104 | 120 | 146 | 147 | 142 | 195 | 286 | 316 | 238 | 312 |
| December 2018 | 2,500 | 66 | 58 | 87 | 119 | 69 | 84 | 94 | 94 | 122 | 139 | 137 | 149 | 197 | 236 | 316 | 242 | 291 |

=== Ethnic composition ===
According to the 2011 census, among those who answered the optional question on ethnic identification (in total 2970), the ethnic composition of the municipality was the following:

| Ethnic group | Population | Percentage |
|---|---|---|
| Bulgarians | 2834 | 96.7% |
| Turks | NA (Note: The figures for those declaring Turkish or Other ethnicities is confidential, as due to their very low number they could be used to identify individual persons and the publishing of such information is prohibited by the Bulgarian Law on Statistics.) | NA |
| Roma (Gypsy) | 70 | 2.4% |
| Other | 19 | 0.6% |
| Undeclared | NA | NA |

Bulgarians constitute the largest ethnic group in the municipality of Novo Selo. Nearly all Romani people are concentrated in the village of Novo Selo. There is also a significant "Vlach" (Romanian) community, but their numbers are declining rapidly.

=== Religion ===
According to the latest Bulgarian census of 2011, the religious composition, among those who answered the optional question on religious identification, was the following:

Religious composition of Novo Selo Municipality
| Orthodox Christianity | 94.0% |
| Catholicism | 0.4% |
| Protestantism | 0.2% |
| Islam | 0.0% |
| No religion | 2.4% |
| Prefer not to answer, others and indefinable | 3.0% |

An overwhelming majority of the population of Novo Selo Municipality identify themselves as Christians. At the 2011 census, 94.0% of respondents identified as Orthodox Christians belonging to the Bulgarian Orthodox Church.

== See also ==
- Provinces of Bulgaria
- Municipalities of Bulgaria
- List of cities and towns in Bulgaria
