= Srebrinovo =

Srebrinovo Сребриново
- Village
- Location within Bulgaria
- Coordinates: 42°32′N 24°01′E
- Country: Bulgaria
- Oblast: Pazardzhik
- Opština: Panagyurishte

Government
  - Mayor (Municipality): Zelyazko Gagov (Ind.)
- Elevation: 490 m (1,610 ft)

Population (2024)
  - Total: 6
- Postal code: 4525
- Vehicle registration: РА

Srebrinovo (Bulgarian: Сребриново) is a village in the Panagyurishte municipality of western Bulgaria. The village has 6 inhabitants.
