= Sbor, Pazardzhik Province =

Village in Pazardzhik Province, Bulgaria

Coordinates: 42°20′00″N 24°18′00″E

Sbor (Bulgarian: Сбор, pronounced [zbɔr]) is a small village Pazardzhik Municipality, Pazardzhik Province, southern Bulgaria. As of 2006 it has 298 inhabitants. The village is situated at 300 m altitude, at 1 km to the east of the main road Pazardzhik-Panagyurishte.

The main agricultural crops raised by the locals are cereals, peanuts, cherries, apples, grapes. The most widespread domestic animals include sheep, poultry and pheasants. The village has a kindergarten and chitalishte. The main landmark is the 19th-century church "Sv. Ioan Predtecha" (1881). The village is mentioned in an Ottoman document from 1576.

A treasure trove which consists of 503 silver Roman coins was found in the vicinity of the village.
