= Tsar Asen =

Village in Pazardzhik Province, Bulgaria

Coordinates: 42°22′00″N 24°20′00″E

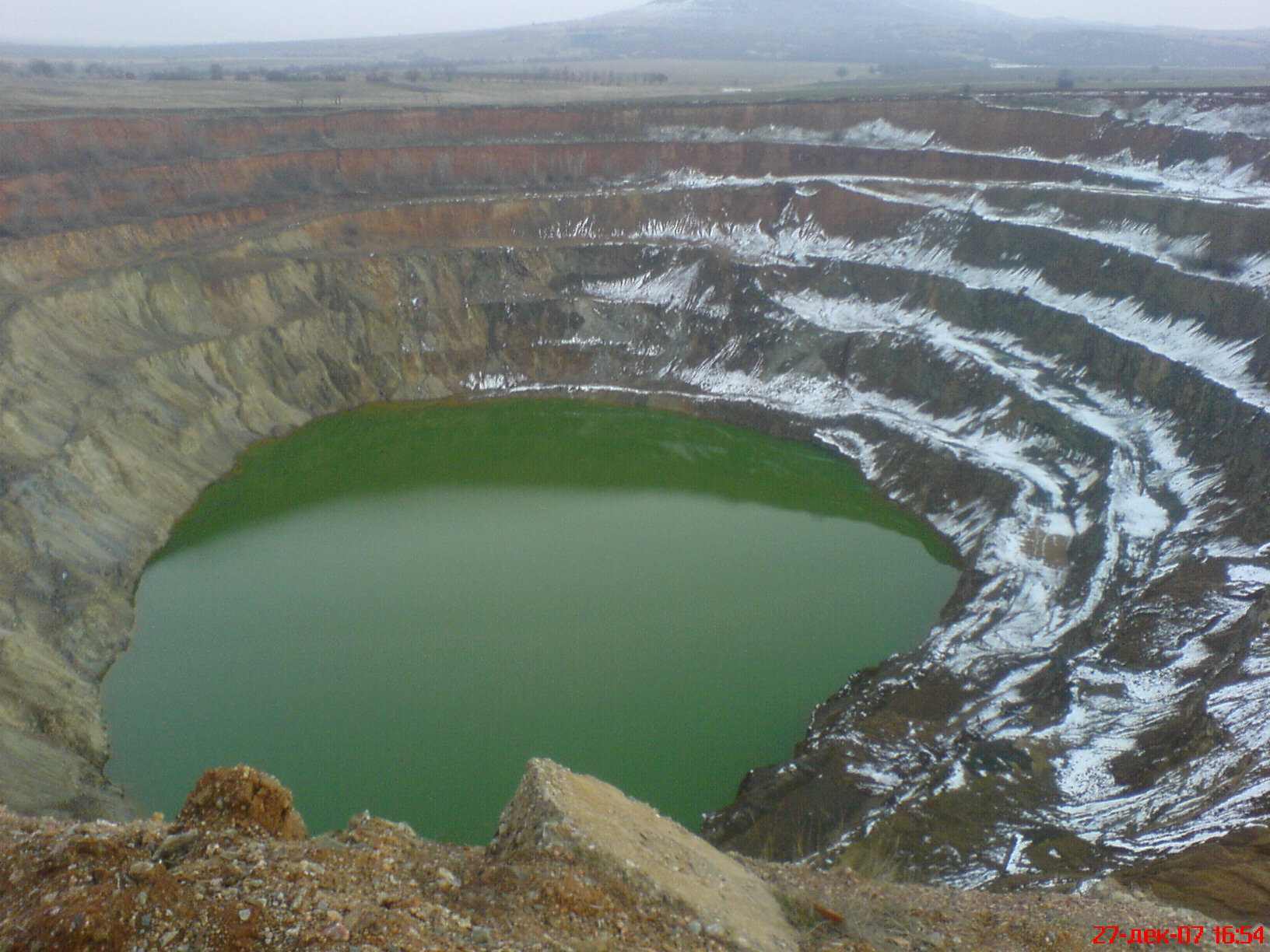
The copper mine near the village.

Tsar Asen (Bulgarian: Цар Асен) is a village in Pazardzhik Municipality, Pazardzhik Province, southern Bulgaria. As of 2006, it has 384 inhabitants. The village is located on one of the several roads between Pazardzhik and Panagyurishte. There is a copper mine in the vicinity.
