= Ovchepoltsi =

Ovchepoltsi Овчеполци
- Village
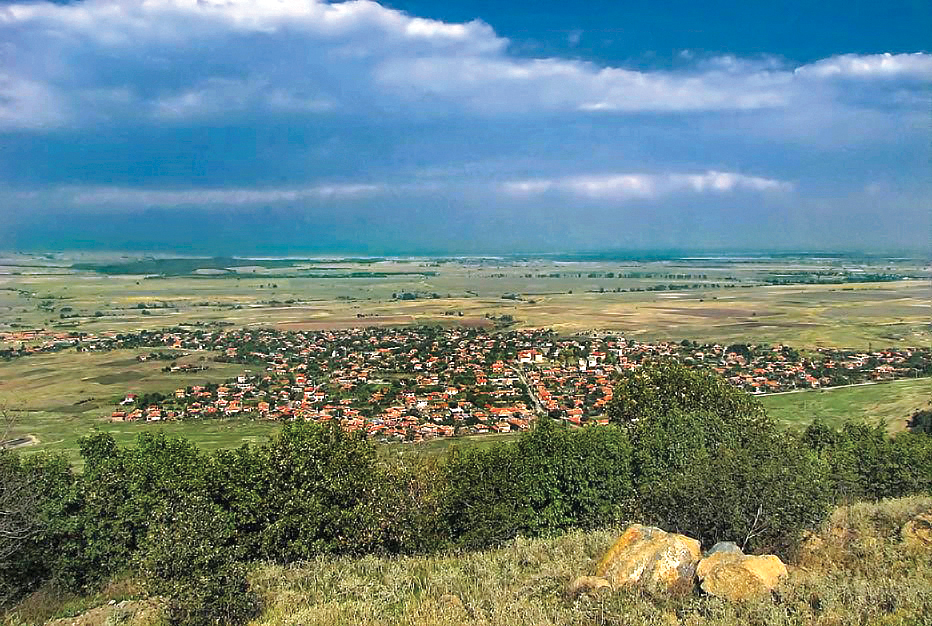

- Location of Ovchepoltsi
- Coordinates: 42°20′N 24°24′E
- Country: Bulgaria
- Province (Oblast): Pazardzhik
- Municipality (Obshtina): Pazardzhik

Government
  - Mayor: Kostadin Karabonchev (NDSV)

Area
  - Total: 30.391 km^{2} (11.734 sq mi)
- Elevation: 298 m (978 ft)

Population (2015-03-15)
  - Total: 1,101
- Time zone: UTC+2 (EET)
  - Summer (DST): UTC+3 (EEST)
- Postal Code: 4448
- Area code: 53285
- Vehicle registration: PA

Ovchepoltsi (Bulgarian: Овчеполци) is a village in Pazardzhik Municipality, Pazardzhik Province, southern Bulgaria. As of 2015 it has 1,101 inhabitants. The village is located in a hilly area, known as Ovchite Halmove (Sheep Hills). As this name suggests, sheep breeding is the main occupation. The village is also a stop at the Plovdiv-Panagyurishte railway.

There is a military airport situated to the south of the village.
