= Saborna crkva =

Saborna crkva (Serbian Cyrillic: Саборна црква) means 'Orthodox cathedral'. It may refer to the following cathedrals:

- St. Michael's Cathedral (Belgrade)
- Saint George's Cathedral (Novi Sad)
- Holy Trinity Cathedral (Niš)
- Serb Orthodox Cathedral (Sarajevo)
- Church of the Dormition of the Theotokos, Szentendre
- Serbian Orthodox Cathedral, Timișoara
- Cathedral of Christ the Saviour (Banja Luka)
- Cathedral of the Holy Trinity (Mostar)
- Serbian Orthodox Cathedral, Zagreb
- Church of St. Nicholas, Karlovac
- Church of St. Demetrius, Dalj
