= Krali Marko, Pazardzhik Province =

Village in Pazardzhin region of Bulgaria

Coordinates: 42°15′N 24°24′E

Krali Marko (Bulgarian: Крали Марко) is a small village in Pazardzhik Municipality, Pazardzhik Province, southern Bulgaria. As of 2006 the population is 264. The village is located on the right bank of the Luda Yana river, close to the large village of Chernogorovo. Despite its small population, Krali Marko occupies a relatively large area, because the houses usually have enormous yards where the locals grow flowers, fruit and vegetables. There is no school because of the few inhabitants, so the children attend the school in Chernogorovo. In spring and summer the village is all in green with blossoming trees and flowers.

The favorable climate, the fertile soils and the well developed irrigation system in the whole region have determined intense and productive agriculture. The most important crops include vegetables (tomatoes, cucumbers, potatoes, pepper, aubergines); fruit (strawberries, apples, peaches, figs); wheat, maize, barley. The most spread domestic animals are chicken including and a chicken farm.
