= Panagyurishte Municipality =

Coordinates: 42°30′11″N 24°11′2″E

- Interactive map of Panagyurishte Municipality
- Country: Bulgaria
- Province: Pazardzhik Province
- Seat: Panagyurishte

Area
  - Total: 598.5 km^{2} (231.1 sq mi)

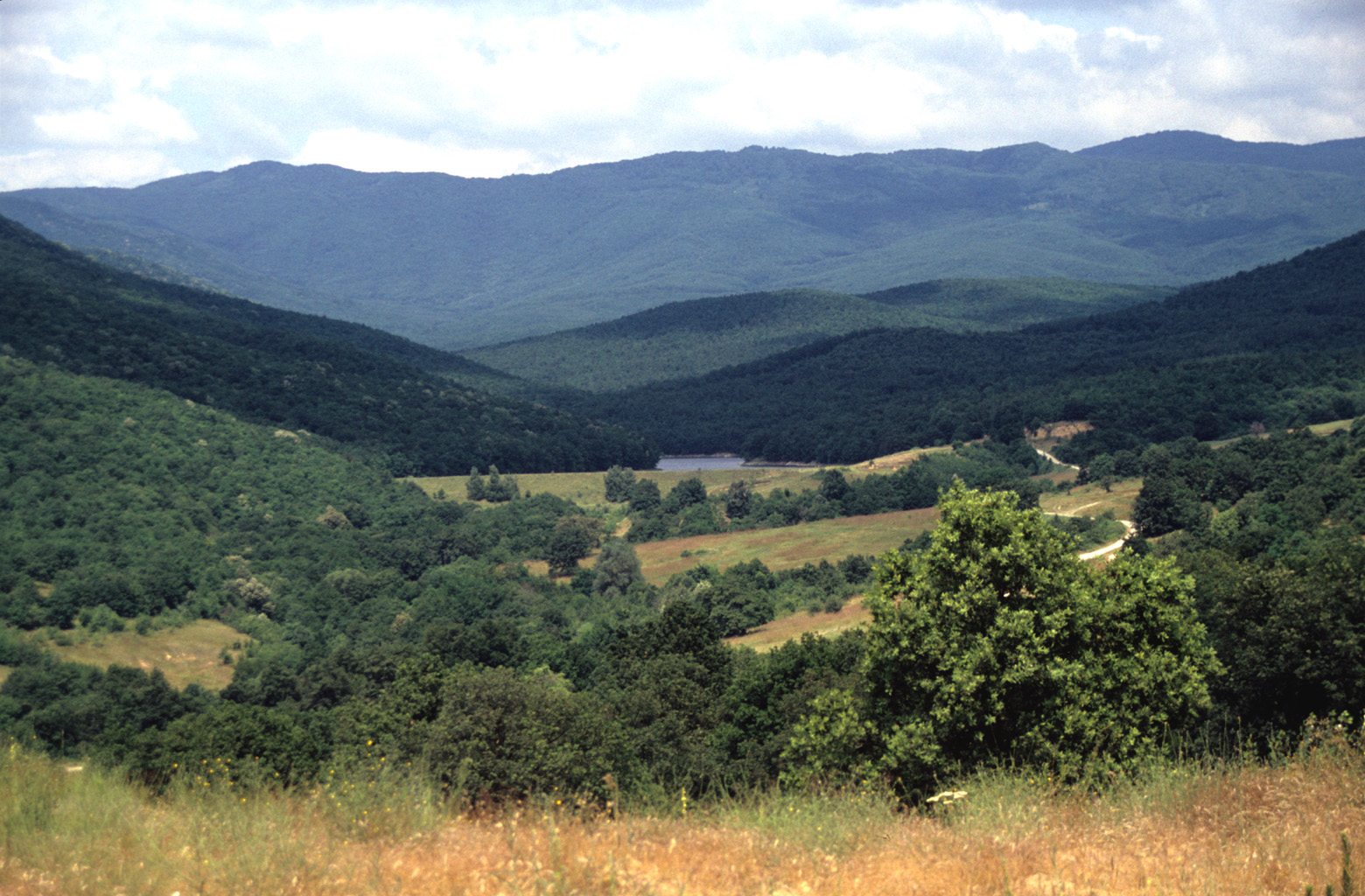
Sredna Gora

Panagyurishte Municipality is located in the Pazardzhik Province, western Bulgaria. It is one of the 11 municipalities in the province. Its territory is 598,5 km² being fourth in the province after the municipalities of Velingrad, Batak and Pazardzhik. The relief is mountainous and semi-mountainous and is part of Sredna Gora. There are rich copper deposits, with the biggest mines located in Asarel Medet, Elshitsa and Mina Radka. There are dense forests in which mushrooms and berries are abundant. Many animals inhabit these forest. The most important game species are red deer, roe deer, wild boar, doe and mouflon.

== Demography ==
As of 2005 the population is 29 924. They live in one town, Panagyurishte and nine villages: Popintsi, Oborishte, Bata, Banya, Poibrene, Levski, Panagyurski kolonii, Elshitsa and Srebrinovo.

=== Religion ===
According to the latest Bulgarian census of 2011, the religious composition, among those who answered the optional question on religious identification, was the following:

Religious composition of Panagyurishte Municipality
Orthodox Christianity	88.9%
Catholicism	0.2%
Protestantism	1.1%
Islam	0.1%
No religion	3.3%
Prefer not to answer, others and indefinable	6.4%

== Economy ==
Most people are employed in industry or in the service sector. Mining, machine building and textiles are well developed. Agriculture is less important. Major crops are barley, wheat, rye and plums. The total length of the roads is only 150 km due to the mountainous relief but are well maintained. The railway is used mainly by freight trains.

Panagyurishte, Panagyurski kolonii and Banya are most popular among the tourists.
