= Negovanovtsi =

Coordinates: 44.091962°N 22.8617951°E

Negovanovtsi (Bulgarian: Неговановци; Romanian: Negovaniț) is a village located in Novo Selo Municipality, part of Vidin Province, Northwestern Bulgaria. The population of the village is 529 at the end of 2017.

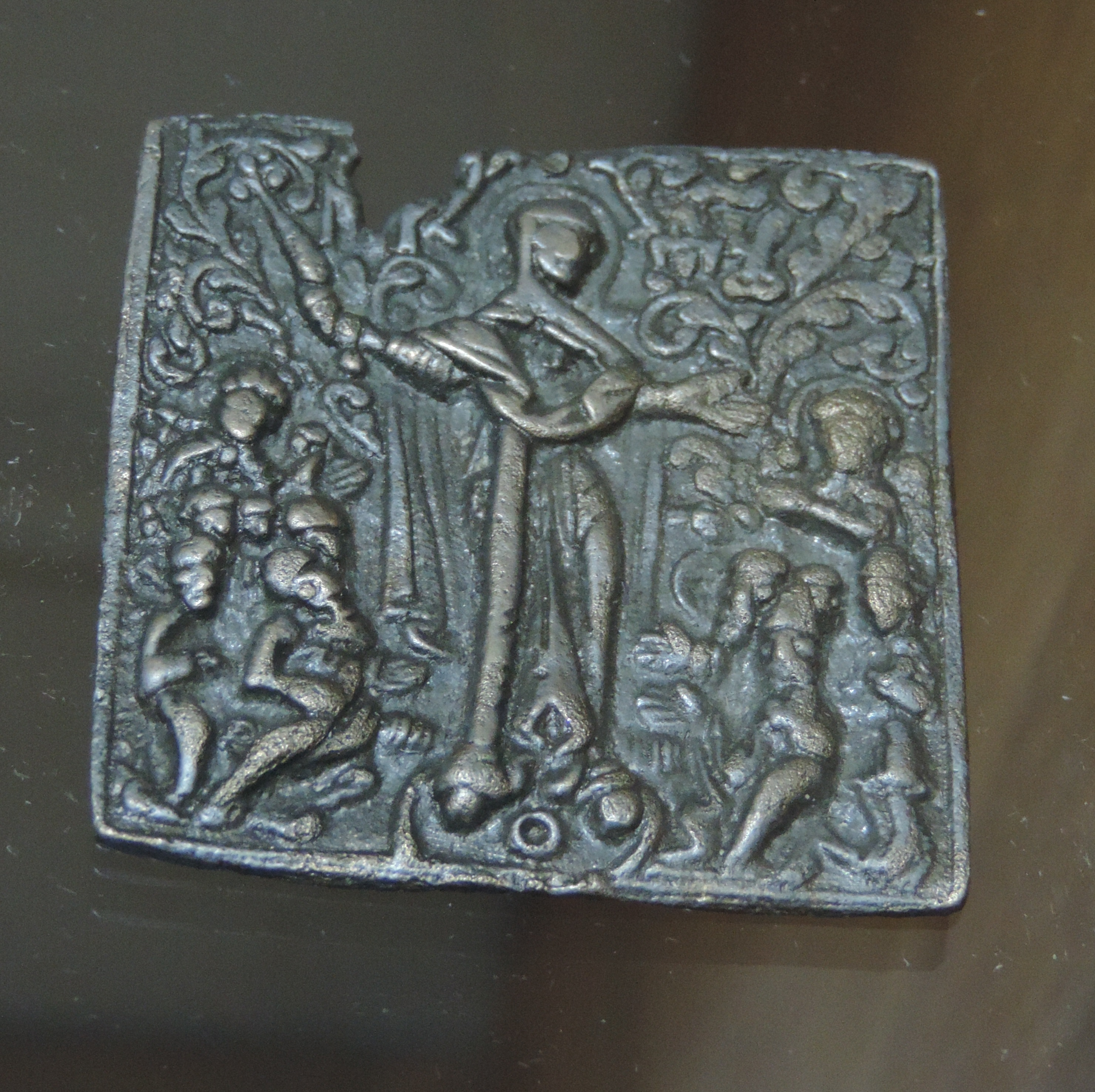
Jewel from a treasure found in a medieval necropolis near the village of Negovanovtsi.

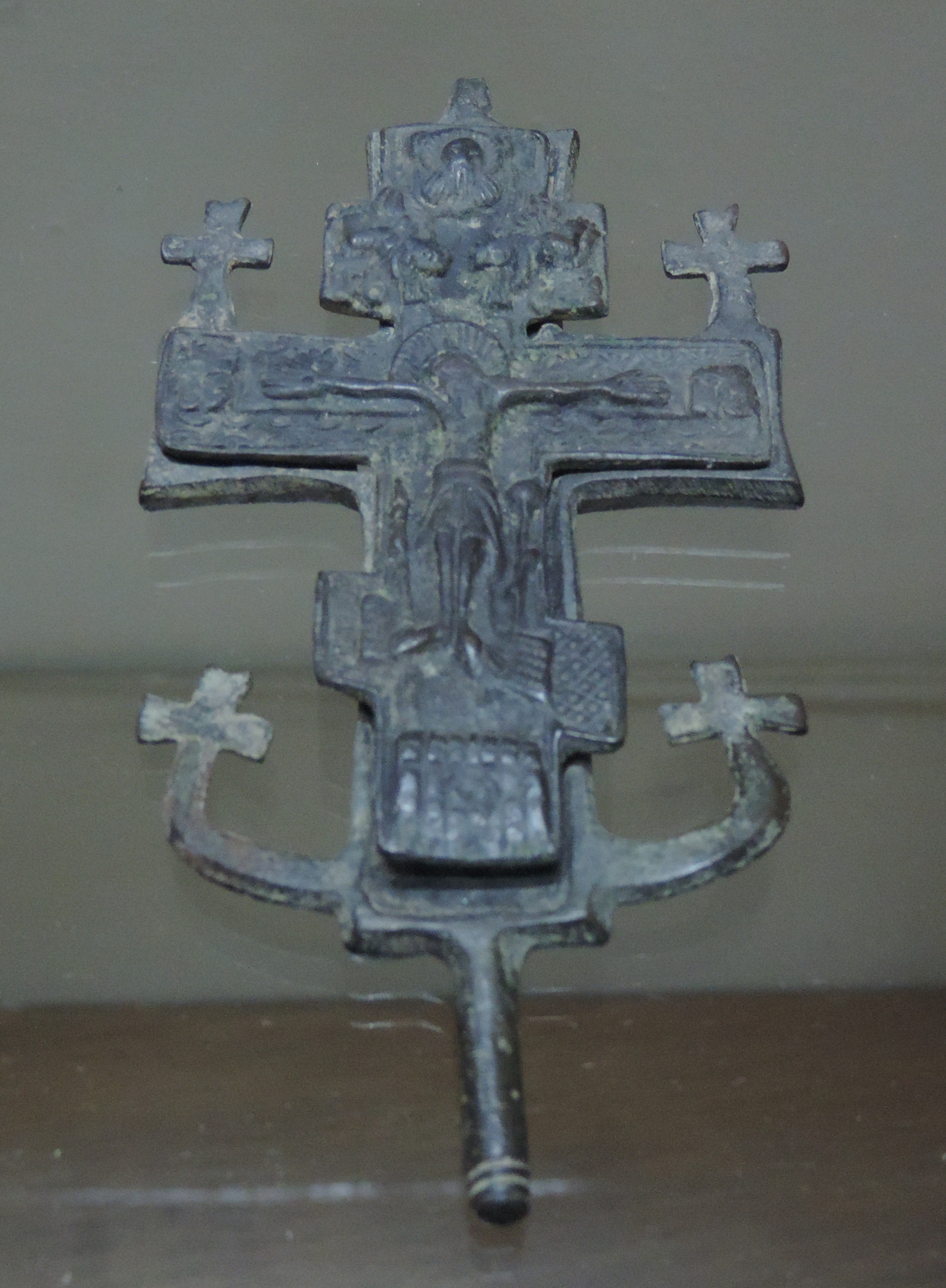
Both pieces of the treasure are exhibits of the collection of Vidin Regional History Museum

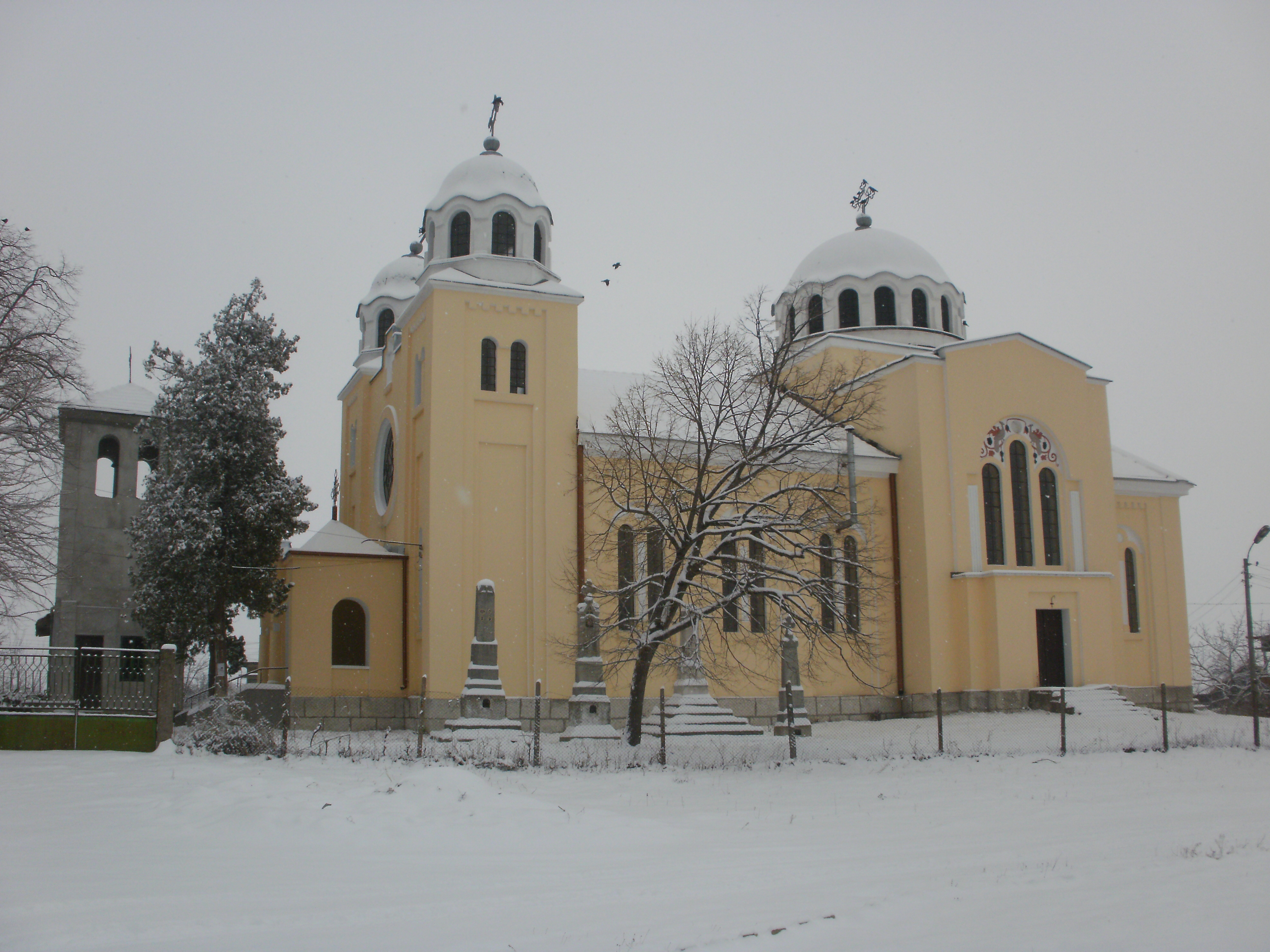
Church "Saint Trinity" in Negovanovtsi

== Population ==
The first Population census recorded in the Principality of Bulgaria, counted 588 ethnic Romanians (88%), 70 ethnic Bulgarians (11%) and 7 ethnic Jews (1%).

As of December 2017 Negovanovtsi has a population of 529 people, down from its peak of 1,695 people shortly after the Second World War. Virtually all inhabitants are ethnic Bulgarians (99%), with fully of partly "Vlach" (Romanian) ancestry (but they mostly declare themselves as ethnic Bulgarians during censuses). An overwhelming majority of the population of the village identify themselves as Christians (95%). Most inhabitants identified as Orthodox Christians belonging to the Bulgarian Orthodox Church.

The Bulgarian language spoken in Negovanovtsi has many similarities with the neighbouring Serbian language and Romanian language.
