= Chitalishte =

Bulgarian combined public institution

The chitalishte in Koprivshtitsa was built in 1869

A chitalishte (Bulgarian: читалище, pronounced [t͡ʃiˈtaliʃtɛ], reading place) is a traditional Bulgarian public institution and building that fulfills several functions at once, such as a community centre, public library, and a theatre. It is also used as an educational institution, where people of all ages can enroll in foreign language, dance, music and other courses. In this function they could be compared to the folk high schools of Northern Europe. Some larger urban chitalishta are comparable to 92nd Street Y in New York City.

== Etymology ==
The term chitalishte combines the Bulgarian Slavic root, chita- ("reading") and the suffix -lishte (a place where the preceding verb happens). Thus chitalishte literally means "reading place" or "reading room", a place where books are kept for public use.

== History ==
The chitalishta of the 19th and early 20th century had a crucial role in preserving and developing Bulgarian culture and thus played an important role during the Bulgarian National Revival. The first institutions of this kind emerged towards the end of the Ottoman era, in 1856 in the towns of Shumen, Lom and Svishtov.

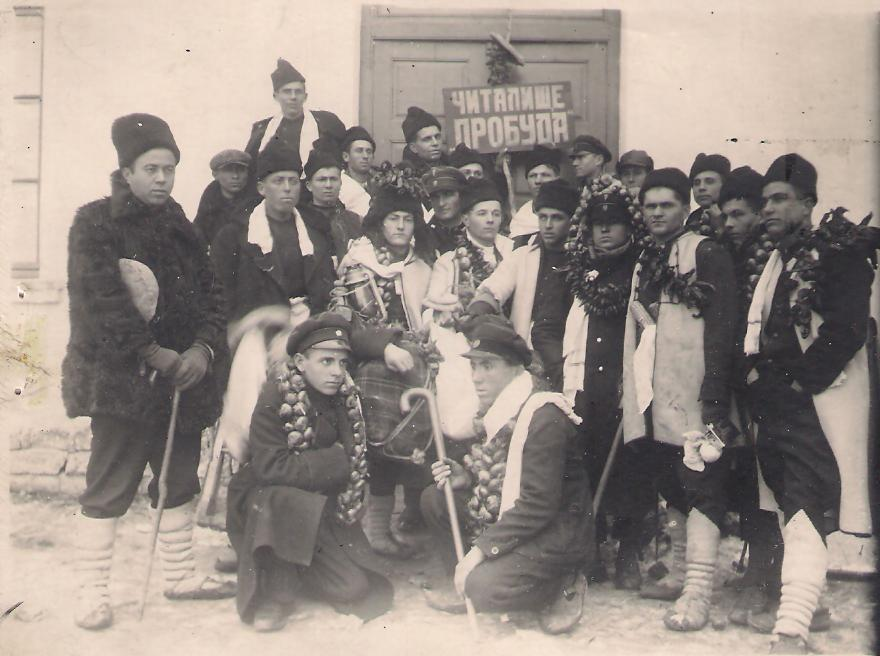
Petrevene youths after Koleduvane (carol singing) in support of the chitalishte, 1930

Unlike Western European subscription libraries of the time, which were often restricted to the elite, the Bulgarian chitalishte was a democratic, community-owned organization. It operated as a grassroots platform for local self-governance and national mobilization during the late Ottoman period. By 1870, a network of over 130 chitalishta existed across Bulgarian lands, funded entirely by voluntary contributions and managed through elected boards where every member had an equal vote.

During the socialist period (1944–1989), the chitalishte network underwent significant expansion and institutionalization under comprehensive state support. The government provided extensive funding, constructing thousands of new purpose-built edifices and equipping them with modern libraries, professional stages, and musical instruments. A notable development during this era was the process of mass kinofication, which involved the installation of cinema projection equipment in nearly every building, making the chitalishte the primary venue for film screenings in both urban and rural areas. While these institutions continued to serve as cultural hubs for the arts and education, they were also integrated into the state apparatus for ideological training and the dissemination of party propaganda.

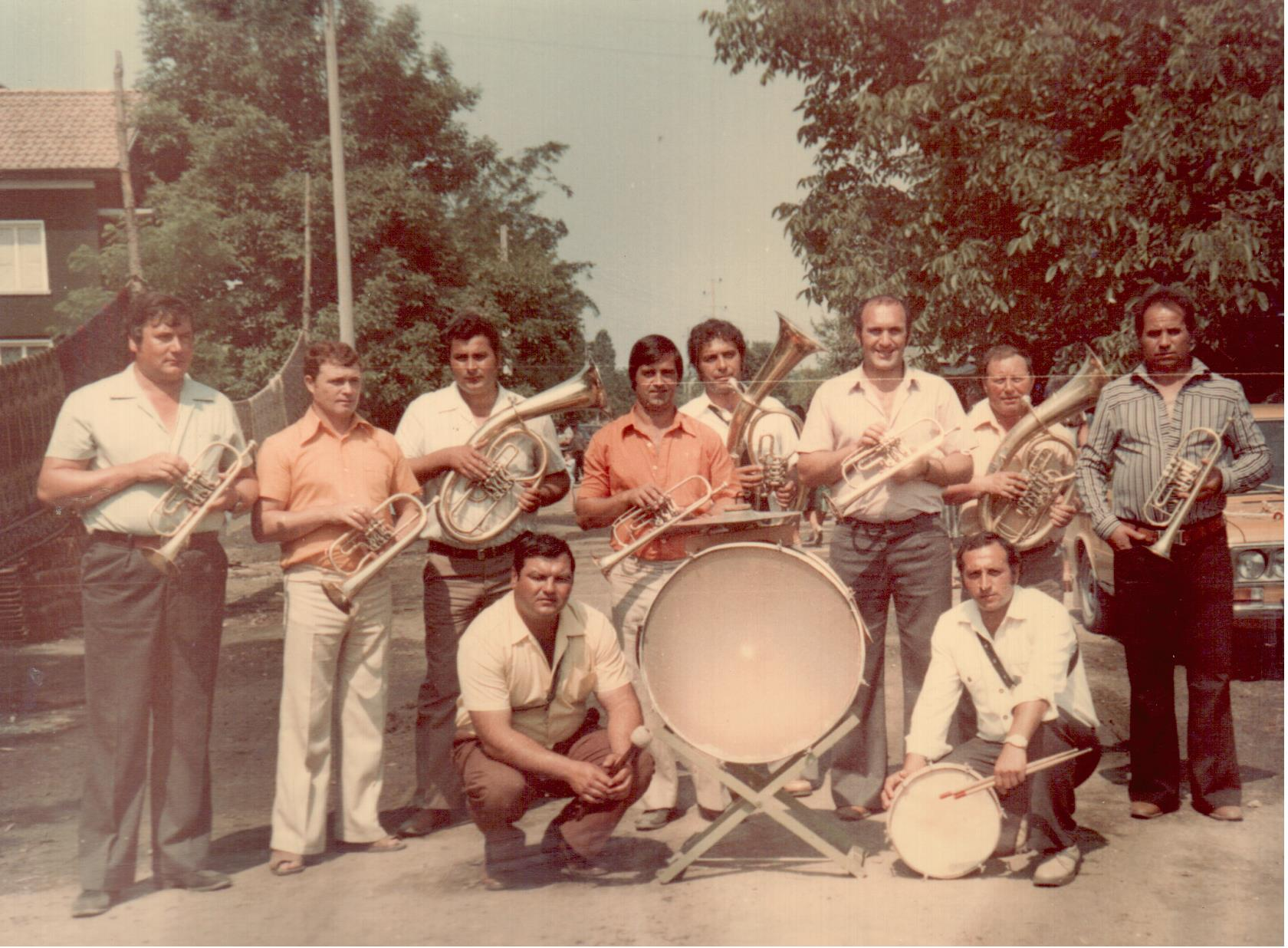
Chitalishte brass band of the village of Negovanovtsi, 1980s

Following the transition to a democratic society and a market economy after 1989, the chitalishte system underwent a period of profound transformation. Amidst significant social and demographic shifts, these institutions adapted their goals and functions to the changing needs of the community. In contemporary Bulgaria, the role of the chitalishte varies significantly depending on its location: in large cities, they operate as diverse cultural and educational centers, while in smaller villages, they have increasingly taken on vital social and community-support functions.

Moving away from the centralized state model of the socialist era, since the 2000s the chitalishte has returned to its original roots as an autonomous, self-governing organization. Although they are once again independent, the state continues to provide support through subsidies, often supplemented by municipal funding. Furthermore, many urban chitalishta have developed the capacity for self-financing through private initiatives and partnerships. This resilience and adaptability led to the Bulgarian chitalishte being recognized by UNESCO in 2017 as a global example of successful community cultural safeguarding.

Today, chitalishta offer a comprehensive range of activities beyond traditional folklore. These include choir singing, theatrical troupes, orchestras, and applied arts workshops. They also serve as educational hubs offering foreign language courses and various sports and physical education programs. A defining characteristic of the modern chitalishte is its strictly non-partisan and secular nature; by law, these institutions are prohibited from hosting political party activities or religious organizations, ensuring they remain neutral spaces for the entire community.

== Buildings ==
Many chitalishte buildings are protected heritage assets, being examples of either traditional Bulgarian architecture, or fin de siècle European architecture. Dedicated chitalishte buildings continued to be built well into the 20th century and under the communist regime, in widely ranging architectural styles - form New Classicism to modernism.

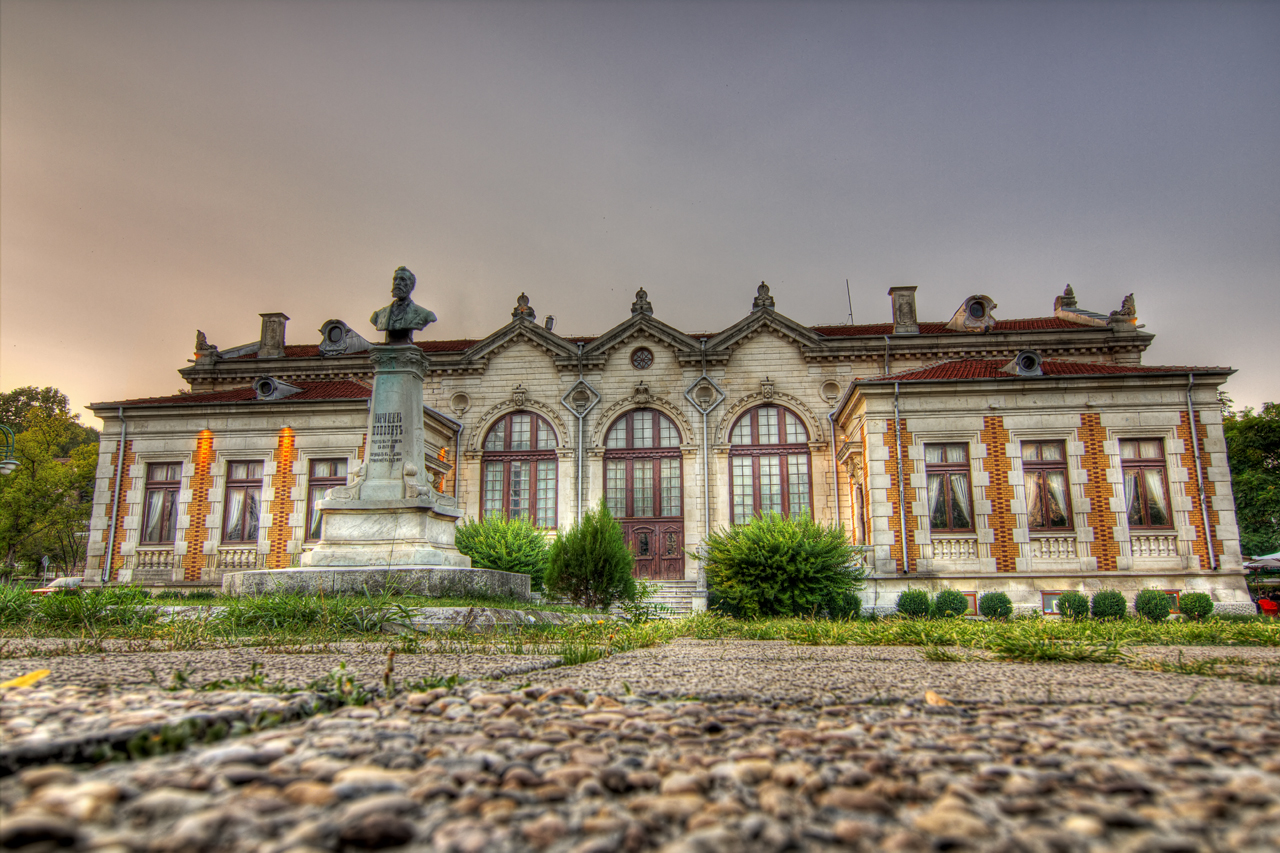
Dobri Voynikov (orig. Archangel Michael), Shumen, built 1898

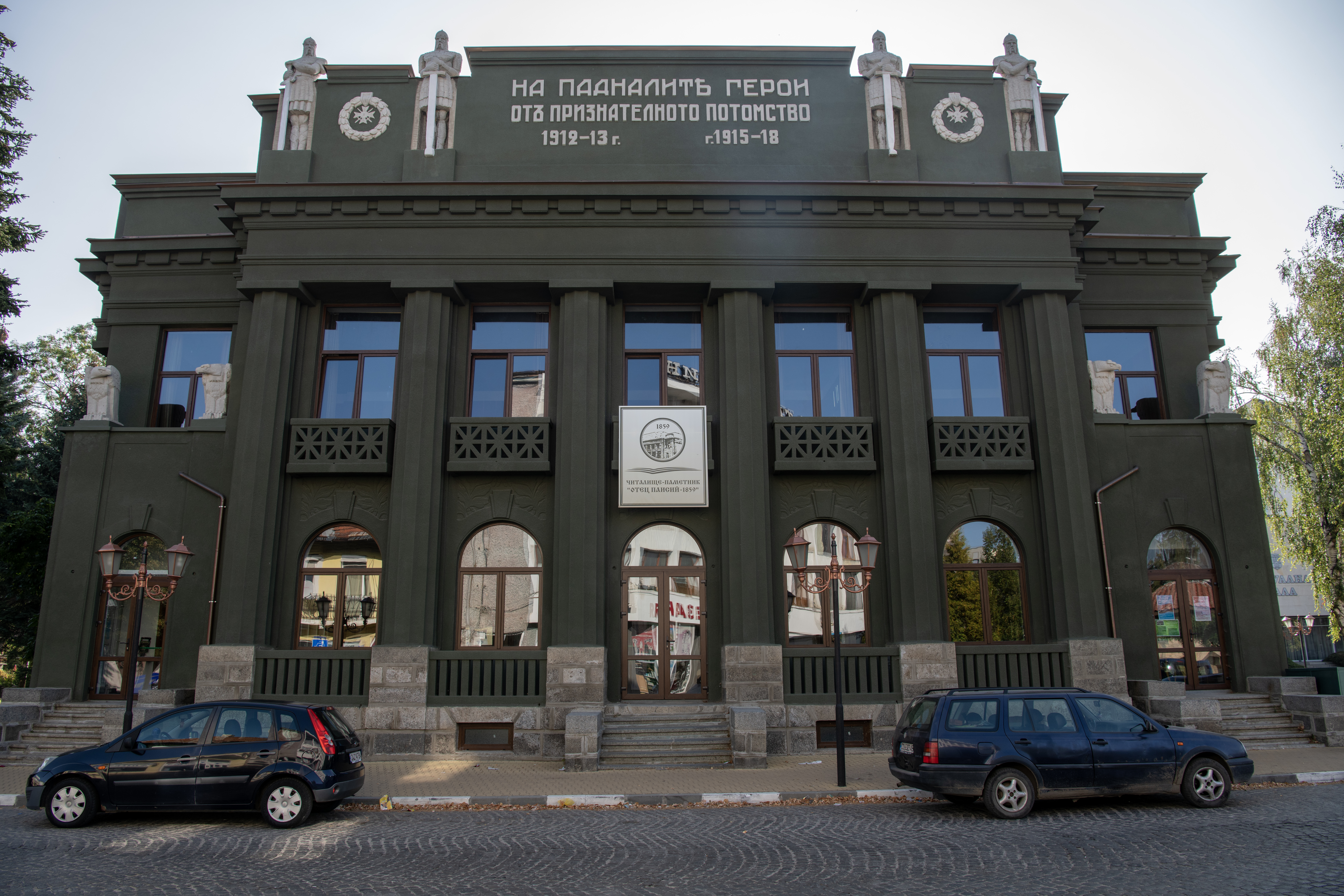
Father Paisius, Samokov, built 1925-1929 as both a chitalishte and a war memorial

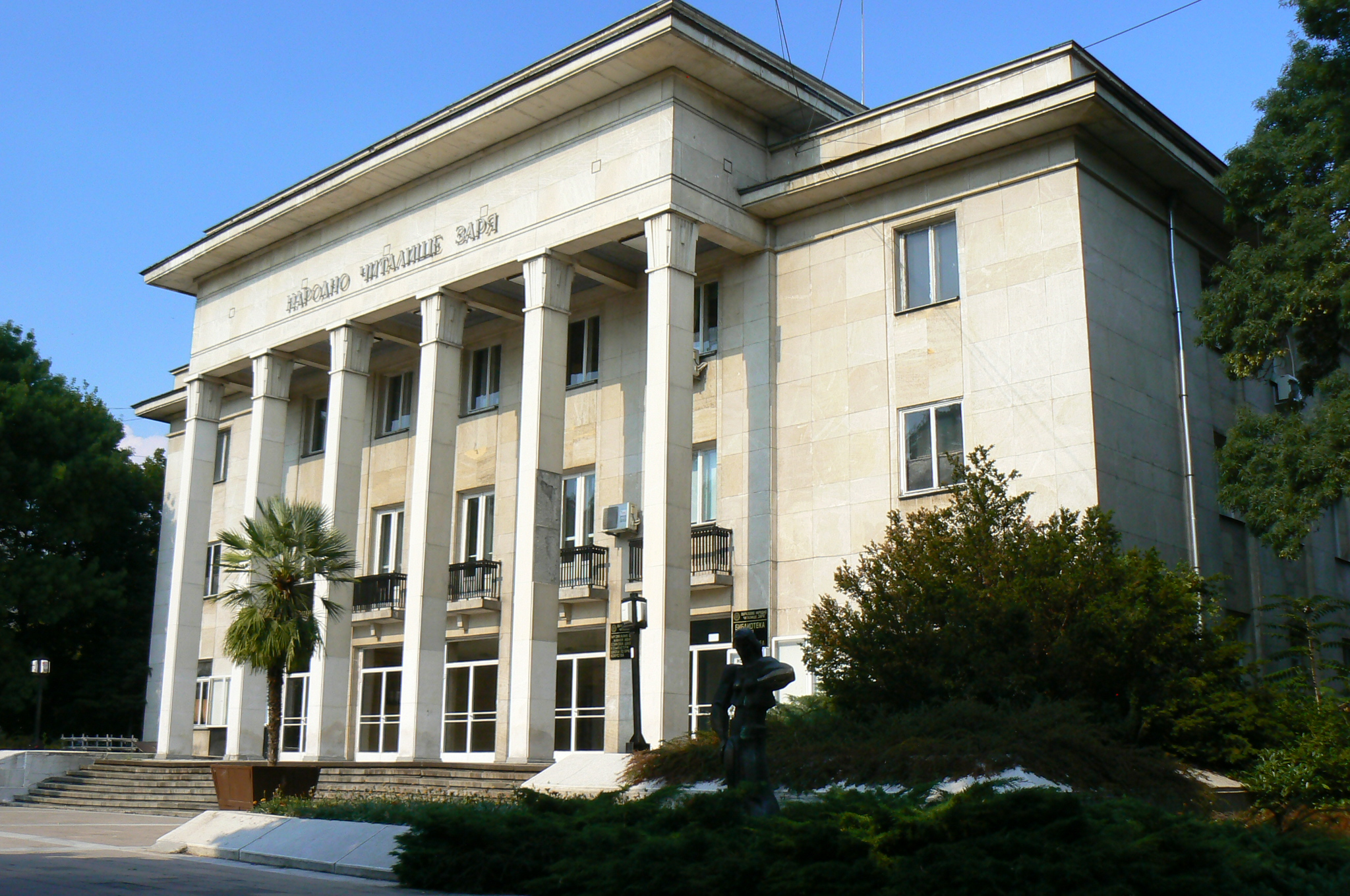
Zarya, Haskovo, built 1960s

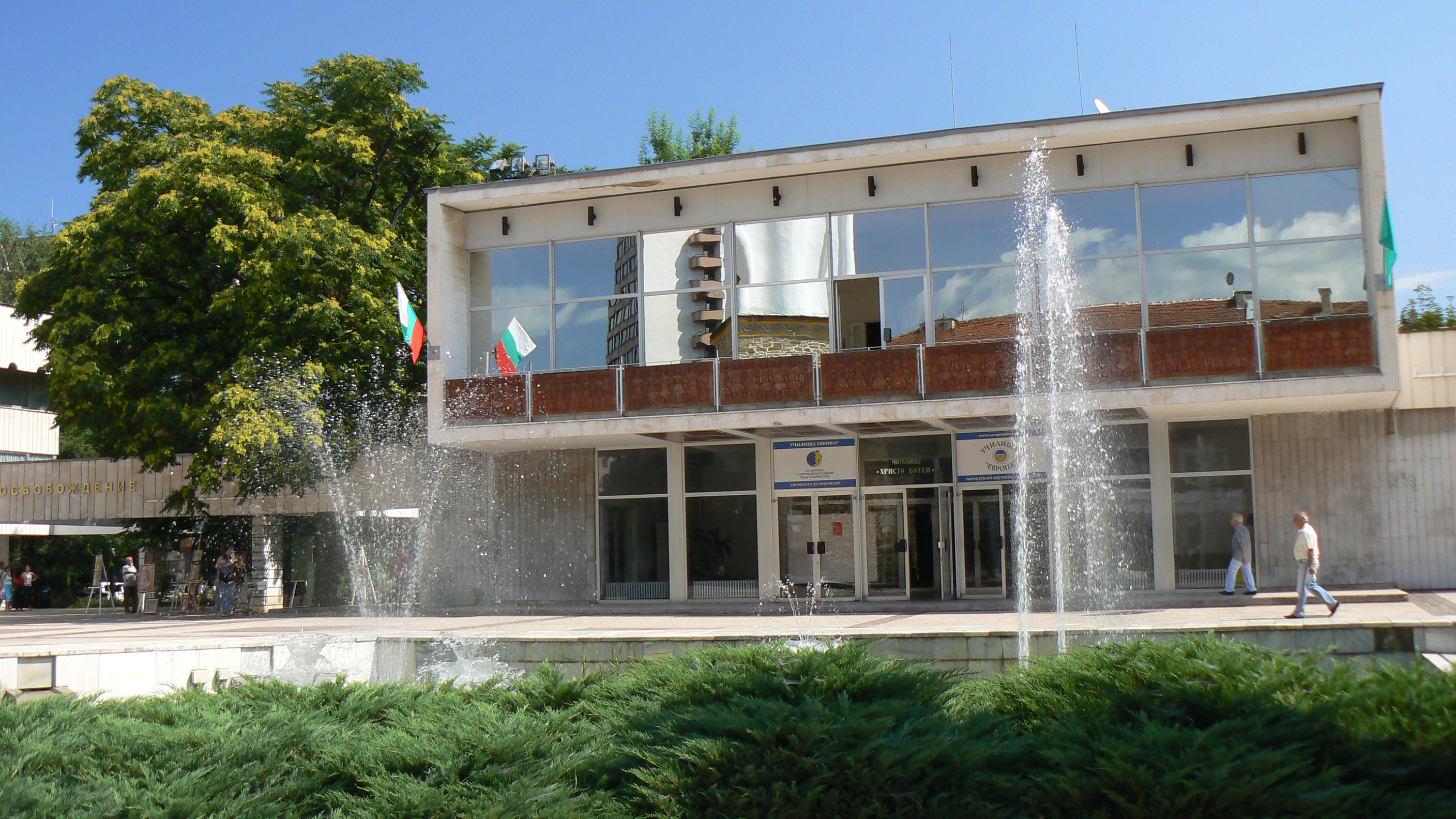
Hristo Botev, Blagoevgrad, built 1960s

Nikola Vaptsarov, Bansko, built 1980s

== Legislation ==
Legally, chitalishta are regulated by the Law about People's Chitalishta (Bulgarian: Закон за народните читалища). The Bulgarian Ministry of Culture maintains a registry of chitalishta and the associations that manage them. They receive subsidies from both the Ministry and municipal governments. Since 2009, the official name of a chitalishte must contain the year of its founding (e.g. Videlina-1862).

== Influence and legacy ==
The multifunctional and democratic structure of the chitalishte served as a significant organizational model for cultural development in Eastern Europe. In the early 20th century, the chitalishte provided the functional blueprint for the Soviet system of Houses of Culture and "Reading Cottages" (izba-chitalnya). While the Imperial Russian People's Houses were often top-down institutions designed for social control, the Bulgarian model offered a decentralized, community-based alternative that was later adapted and institutionalized across the Eastern Bloc. This Soviet-adapted model was subsequently exported to other communist states in Asia (such as China, Vietnam, and North Korea) and the Americas (notably Cuba), where it became the standard infrastructure for state-sponsored community culture.

The concept of a multifunctional "House of Culture" also appeared in Western Europe later, such as the French Maison de la culture network established in the 1960s. The longevity and resilience of the chitalishte model are recognized by its inclusion in the UNESCO Register of Good Safeguarding Practices. It is officially cited as a successful practical experience in safeguarding the vitality of intangible cultural heritage and fostering community participation.

== See also ==
- Education in Bulgaria
- Culture of Bulgaria
- Palace of Culture
- Narodny dim, the Ukrainian equivalent
