= Pazardzhik Municipality =

Coordinates: 42°11′21″N 24°19′57″E

- Interactive map of Pazardzhik Municipality
- Country: Bulgaria
- Province: Pazardzhik Province

Area
  - Total: 640 km^{2} (250 sq mi)

Pazardzhik Municipality (Bulgarian: Община Пазарджик) is the second largest municipality in Pazardzhik Province, after Velingrad. It occupies 640 km^{2} or 14.3% of the province. Its territory encompasses the westernmost parts of the Upper Thracian Plain and is famous for its fertility.

== Demography ==
The population of 134,295 lives in 32 settlements which include one town (Pazardzhik) and 31 villages.

=== Religion ===
According to the latest Bulgarian census of 2011, the religious composition, among those who answered the optional question on religious identification, was the following:

Religious composition of Pazardzhik Municipality
Orthodox Christianity	83.3%
Catholicism	0.4%
Protestantism	1.7%
Islam	4.2%
No religion	3.8%
Prefer not to answer, others and indefinable	6.6%
