= Vasilev =

Vasilev or Vassilev (Bulgarian: Василев), feminine Vassileva or Vassileva (Bulgarian: Василева), is a Bulgarian surname. Notable people with the surname include:

== Vasilev ==
- Aleksandar Vasilev (disambiguation), multiple people
- Anton Vasilev (born 1983), Russian sprint canoeist
- Asparuh Vasilev (born 1981), Bulgarian footballer
- Boyko Vasilev (born 1970), Bulgarian journalist
- Dimitar Vasilev (1903–?), Bulgarian fencer
- Doychin Vasilev (1944–2024), Bulgarian mountain climber and cinematographer
- Georgi Vasilev (disambiguation), multiple people
- Ilian Vassilev (born 1956), Bulgarian diplomat and writer
- Indiana Vassilev (born 2001), American association football player
- Ivaylo Vasilev (disambiguation), multiple people
- Ivan Vasilev (born 1967), Bulgarian footballer
- Krum Vassilev (1925–2020), Bulgarian politician
- Kyril Vassilev (1908–1987), Bulgarian-American portrait painter
- Mikhail Vasilev (born 1961), Russian handball player
- Milen Vasilev (born 1988), Bulgarian footballer
- Mladen Vasilev (born 1947), Bulgarian footballer and manager
- Nikolay Vasilev (born 1969), Bulgarian politician and economist
- Petar B. Vasilev (1918–2001), Bulgarian film director and screenwriter
- Petko Vasilev (born 1990), Bulgarian footballer
- Radoslav Vasilev (born 1990), Bulgarian footballer
- Steven A. Vasilev (born 1954), American physician
- Tsonyo Vasilev (1952–2015), Bulgarian footballer
- Tsvetan Vasilev (born 1959), Bulgarian entrepreneur and financier
- Vasil Vasilev (disambiguation), multiple people
- Vasko Vassilev (born 1970), Bulgarian violinist and conductor
- Ventsislav Vasilev (born 1988), Bulgarian footballer
- Vesselin Vassilev (born 1974), French-Bulgarian artist painter and printmaker

== Vasileva ==
- Antoaneta Vassileva (born 1960), Bulgarian professor of economics
- Hristina Vassileva (born 1984), Bulgarian figure skater
- Margarita Vasileva, Bulgarian rhythmic gymnast
- Nadejda Vassileva (born 1985), Bulgarian tennis player
- Ralitsa Vassileva (born 1967), Bulgarian journalist
- Svetla Vassileva (disambiguation), multiple people
- Vivi Vassileva (born 1994), German percussionist

== See also ==
- 3930 Vasilev, main-belt asteroid
- Vasilev Bay, bay in Antarctica
