= Smilets, Pazardzhik Province =

Smilets Смилец
- Village
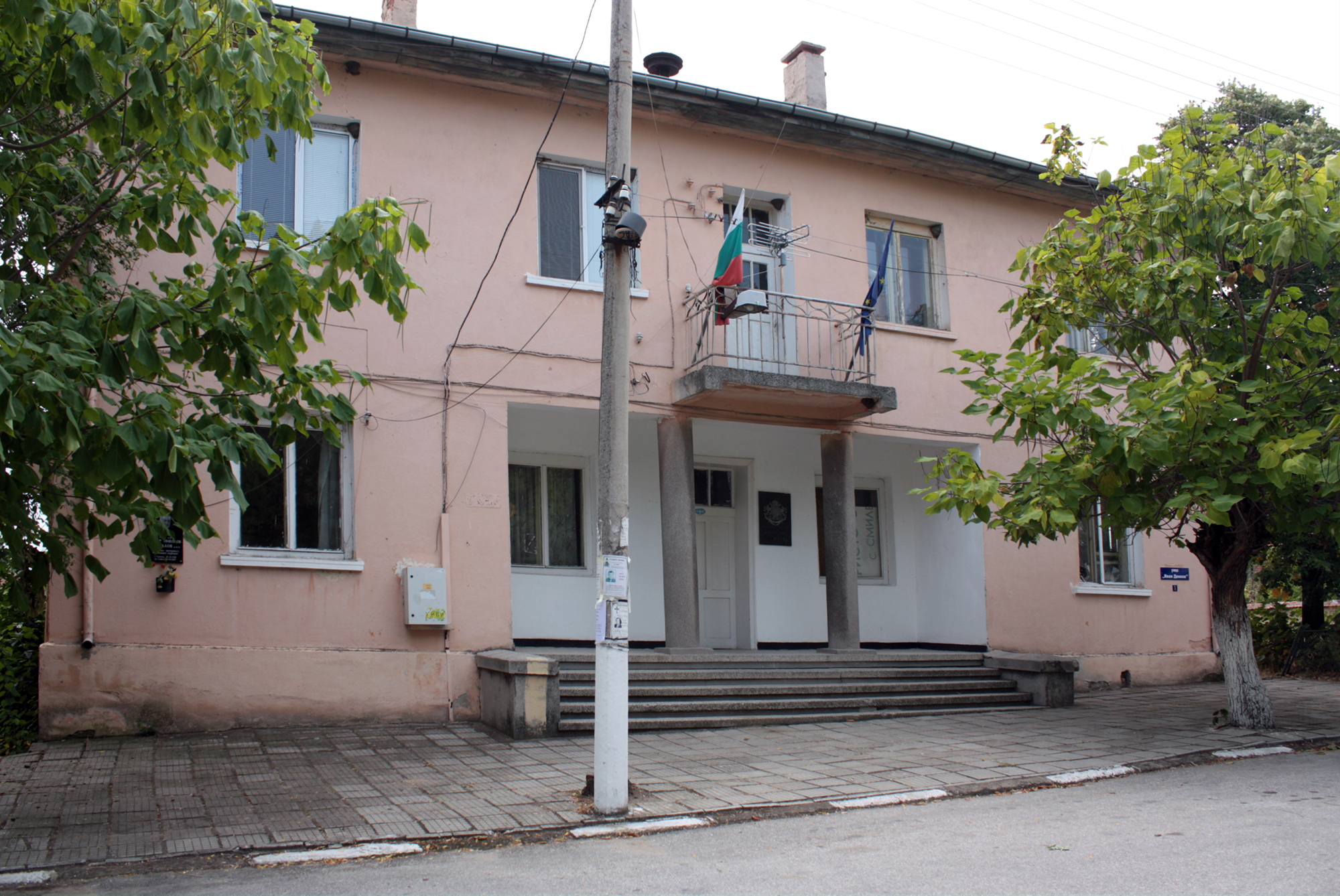

- Location of Smilets
- Coordinates: 42°24′29.43″N 24°22′37.76″E
- Country: Bulgaria
- Provinces (Oblast): Pazardzhik Province

Area
  - Total: 47.704 km^{2} (18.419 sq mi)
- Elevation: 436 m (1,430 ft)

Population (2024)
  - Total: 269
  - Density: 5.64/km^{2} (14.6/sq mi)
- Time zone: UTC+2 (EET)
  - Summer (DST): UTC+3 (EEST)
- Postal Code: 4531

Smilets (Bulgarian: Смилец) is a village near Strelcha, western Bulgaria. As of 2024 it had 269 inhabitants. It is named after the medieval Bulgarian emperor Smilets (r. 1292–1298).

== Geography ==
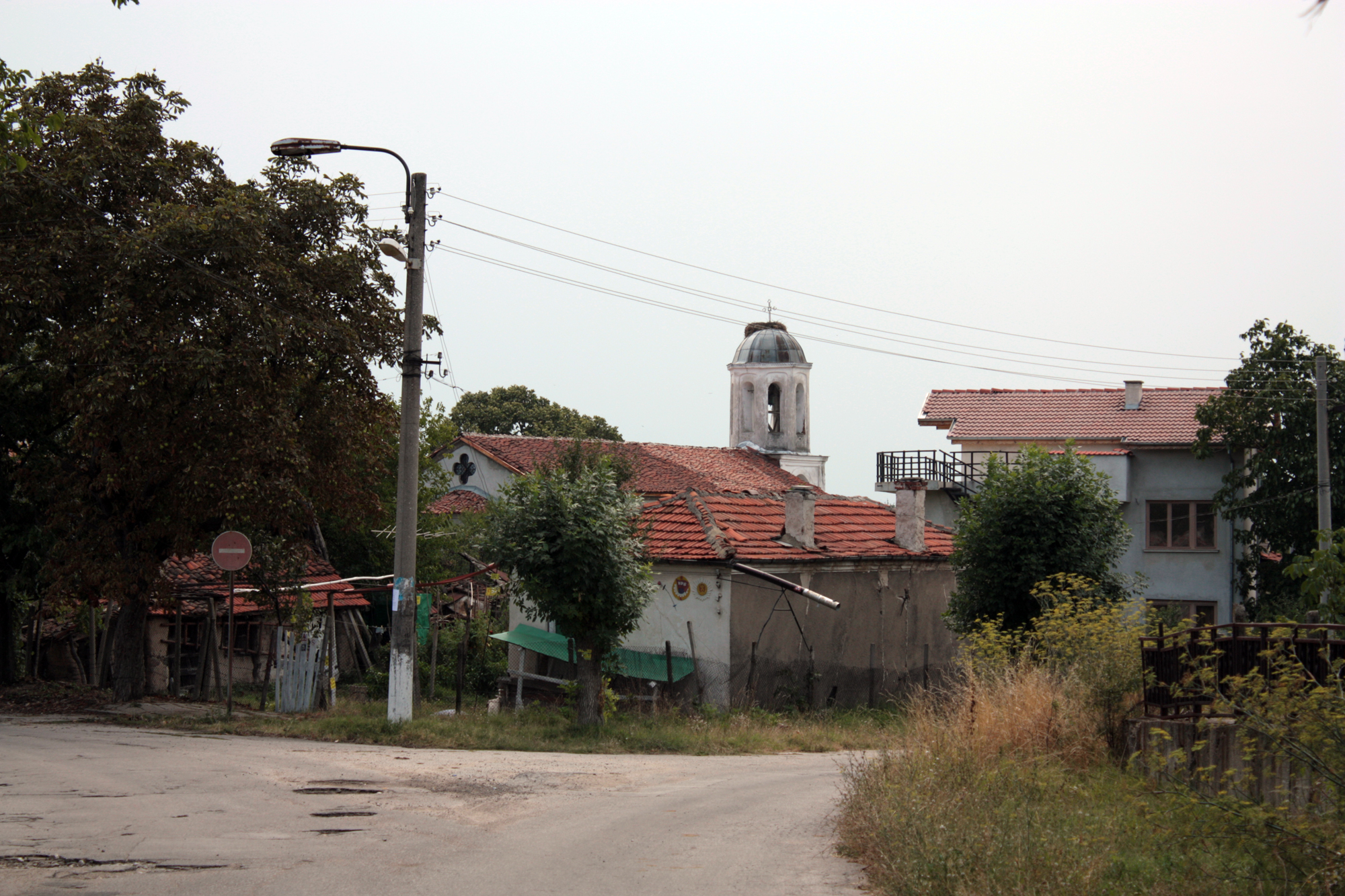
A street in Smilets

The village is situated in a mountainous region, lying in the southern foothills of the central part of the Sredna Gora mountain range, as it descends to the Upper Thracian Plain amidst hilly terrain, steep hills and deep ravines. The river Strelchanska Luda Yana runs west of the settlement and flows into the river Luda Yana, a left tributary of the Maritsa of the Aegean Sea basin. The village falls within the temperate continental climatic zone. The soils are mainly cinnamon forest.

Administratively, Smilets is part of Strelcha Municipality, located in the northeastern part of Pazardzhik Province. It has a territory of 34.1 km^{2}. The village lies some 12 km south–southeast of the municipal center Strelcha and 29 km north–northeast of the provincial seat, the city of Pazardzhik. The closest settlements are Dyulevo to the north, Blatnitsa to the south, and Svoboda to the southwest. It is served by the third class III-8003 road. The railway line Plovdiv–Panagyurishte runs through the village but there is no railway station.

== History and culture ==
The area of Smilets has been inhabited since antiquity. The village was mentioned in Ottoman registers of 1586. It participated in the anti-Ottoman April Uprising of 1876 and was burnt down by the Ottomans.

The village has a school since 1860 and a church dedicated to St John of Rila. The local cultural center, known in Bulgarian as a chitalishte, was established in 1908 and was named after Georgi Mihaylov. The chitalishte has a library and a small museum. There is a monument to the fallen for the national unification in the Balkan Wars and the First World War.

== Economy ==
The village economy is mainly based in agriculture. Crops include cereals, grapes, vegetables and fruits, mainly plums. Livestock breeding is also developed, mainly sheep, pigs and cattle.
