= Alexander Vasilyev =

Alexander Vasilyev may refer to:

- Alexander Vasiliev (historian) (1867–1953), author of History of the Byzantine Empire
- Alexander Vasiliev (priest) (1894–1944), Orthodox (later Catholic) priest
- Alexander Vassiliev (born 1962), Russian journalist
- Alexander Vasilyev (musician) (born 1969), Russian musician
- Alexandr Vasiliev (ice hockey) born 1989), Russian ice hockey player
- Aleksandr Vasiliev (politician) (born 1982), Russian politician
- Alexander Vasilyev (serial killer), Russian serial killer

== See also ==
- Aleksandr Vasilyev (disambiguation)
- Alexey Vasilyev (disambiguation)
- Vasilyev
- Alexandre Vassiliev - fashion historian
