= Strelcha Municipality =

- Municipality
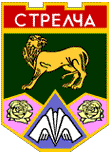
- Coat of arms

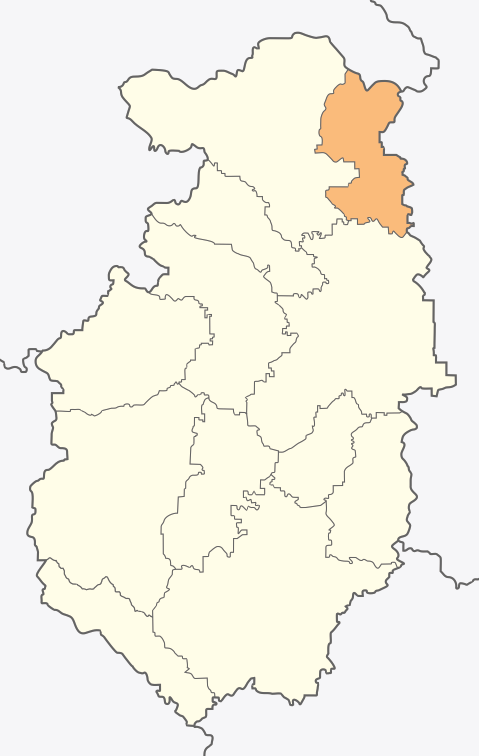
- Location of Strelcha Municipality in Pazardzhik Province

- Location of Strelcha Municipality in Bulgaria
- Coordinates: 42°30′12″N 24°19′19″E
- Country: Bulgaria
- Province: Pazardzhik Province
- Capital: Strelcha

Area
  - Total: 224.46 km^{2} (86.66 sq mi)
- Elevation: 512 m (1,680 ft)

Population (2011)
  - Total: 4,913
  - Density: 21.89/km^{2} (56.69/sq mi)
- Postal code: 4530
- Area code: 03532

Strelcha Municipality (Bulgarian: Община Стрелча) is in southern Bulgaria, part of Pazardzhik Province. The territory is part of Sredna Gora mountain, with the lowest point 304 m AMSL and the highest - 1,572 m AMSL. The railway connecting Panagyurishte Town with Plovdiv City passes through the municipality.

== Settlements ==
Beyond the capital, Strelcha Town, there are four villages in the municipality:

- Blatnitsa
- Dyulevo
- Smilets
- Svoboda

== Demography ==
Ethnic composition of Strelcha Municipality
1. Bulgarians (74.0%)
2. Gypsies/Romani (5.84%)
3. No identification (19.8%)
4. Other (0.54%)

At the 2011 census, the population of Strelcha was 4,913. Most of the inhabitants (74.04%) were Bulgarians, and there was a significant minority of Gypsies/Romani (5.84%). 19.76% of the population's ethnicity was unknown.
