= Aleksandar Vasilev =

Aleksandar Vasilev may refer to:

- Aleksandar Vasilev (footballer, born 1936) (1936–1967), Bulgarian footballer
- Aleksandar Vasilev (Macedonian footballer) (born 1985)
- Aleksandar Vasilev (footballer, born 1995), Bulgarian footballer
- Alexander Vasilev (tennis) (born 2007), Bulgarian tennis player

== See also ==
- Aleksandr Vasilyev (disambiguation)
- Alexander Vasilyev (disambiguation)
- Alexey Vasilyev (disambiguation)
