= Vasilevich =

Vasilevich (patronymic and family name) may refer to:

- Aleksandr Vasilevich Suvorov (1729 or 1730 – 1800), a major Russian military figure
- Fedor Vasilevich Tokarev (1871–1968), Russian weapons designer and deputy of the Supreme Soviet of the USSR 1937–1950
- Matvei Vasilevich Golovinsky (1865–1920), Russian-French writer, journalist and political activist
- Ilya Vasilevich (born 2000), Belarusian footballer
- Tatjana Vasilevich (born 1977), Ukrainian chess player, and an international master

== See also ==
- Vasilev
- Vasilievichy
