= Aleksandr Vasilyev =

Aleksandr Vasilyev may refer to:

- Aleksandr Vasilyev (hurdler) (born 1961), Soviet-Belarusian hurdler
- Aleksandr Vasilyev (runner), Russian long-distance runner at the 2004 IAAF World Half Marathon Championships
- Aleksandr Vasilyev (footballer, born 1990), Russian football midfielder/forward
- Aleksandr Vasilyev (footballer, born 1980), Russian football manager and former midfielder
- Aleksandr Vasilyev (footballer, born 1992), Russian football midfielder/forward
- Aleksandr Vasilyev (footballer, born 2000), Russian winger for Dynamo Vladivostok

== See also ==
- Alexander Vasilyev (disambiguation)
- Alexey Vasilyev (disambiguation)
- Aleksandar Vasilev (disambiguation)
