= Yegor Khabarov =

Russian murderer and suspected serial killer

- Born: Yegor Nikolayevich Khabarov; May 18, 1979 (age 47); Sverdlovsk, Sverdlovsk Oblast, RSFSR (present-day Yekaterinburg, Russia)
- Other names: "The Electrician" "The Electric Maniac"
- Conviction: N/A (Acquitted by reason of insanity)
- Penalty: N/A

Details
- Victims: 2–7
- Span of crimes: 2008–2009
- Country: Russia
- State: Sverdlovsk
- Date apprehended: May 14, 2009

Yegor Nikolayevich Khabarov (Russian: Егор Николаевич Хабаров; born May 18, 1979), known as The Electrician (Russian: Электрик), is a Russian murderer and suspected serial killer who was convicted of electrocuting at least two men in Yekaterinburg from 2008 to 2009, with the help of accomplice Sergey Kochnev. He was suspected in a total of seven deaths, but was never charged due to a lack of evidence.

In 2010, Khabarov was found not guilty by reason of insanity and interned at a psychiatric clinic, from where he was released after 12 years. This controversial move sparked much controversy and claims that he was discharged due to corrupt hospital officials being bribed by his rich parents.

== Biography ==
=== Childhood and youth ===
Yegor Nikolayevich Khabarov was born on May 18, 1979, in Sverdlovsk (present-day Yekaterinburg). He grew up in a relatively prosperous and safe environment, which was only bolstered after his father Nikolai achieved success with his business ventures in the early 1990s. At school, Khabarov expressed great interest in physics, but was considered unpopular due to his introverted nature, causing him to become withdrawn and aloof. Because of this, he had to be interned at a psychiatric hospital for some time.

After graduating from high school in 1997, Khabarov enrolled at the Ural State Technical University, where he studied electrical engineering. After successfully graduating from there, he got a job as a foreman of a power plant at the Novoberezyovskaya CHPP. During this period, his father bought him an apartment with an underground garage in another district of Yekaterinburg, where Khabarov soon moved into.

According to friends and acquaintances, Khabarov was considered a very likeable, compassionate and helpful man, but had difficulty communicating with girls due to his short stature, slim build and premature baldness. In late 2002, Khabarov began to show signs of a mental illness and started acting erratically, leading to his first crimes.

=== First crimes ===
In 2003, Khabarov was arrested on suspicion of making counterfeit 500-ruble banknotes, but the charge was later dismissed due to a lack of evidence. In September 2004, he was arrested on charges of manufacturing homemade explosives with the intent of selling - investigators said that he had studied the necessary literature and materials from the Internet and he had managed to make a mixture of ammonium nitrate, aluminium powder and minium. Khabarov then placed a wire loop on the casing of the bombs as a pin, which exploded after about four minutes. He detonated several of the devices at the Mikhailovsky Cemetery in Yekaterinburg, making video recordings of the explosions which he planned to use as proof to his potential clients that they worked. After his arrest, officers recovered two such videos and several explosive devices which would be used as evidence at his later trial.

In response to this, Khabarov's father hired a team of lawyers who petitioned for a forensic psychiatric evaluation at the Sverdlovsk Regional Clinical Psychiatric Hospital, which found him to be insane. As a result, Khabarov was detained at a facility in the village of Iset, and after spending several months there, he was released with impunity in 2005 - in spite of the fact that a diagnosis determined that he suffered from a superiority complex.

Between 2005 and 2008, Khabarov attempted to engage in entrepreneurial activity, acting as an intermediary in the sale of electrical products and industrial pipes on behalf of his father's companies. During this period, he developed his skills in electrical engineering and invented a number of devices and appliances, some of which were used in the commission of future crimes. Sometime in 2008, he formed a small gang with which he attempted to commit small-time crimes, but eventually dismissed them after they were met with failure. Thinking that his previous accomplices were too cowardly and lacking willpower, Khabarov convinced several colleagues from his job as a security guard to join in instead - in this group, he established strict discipline and enjoyed unquestionable authority, despite his stocky physique and frail appearance.

In order to supply his gang with weapons, Khabarov purchased gas pistols, which he later converted to fire live ammunition and tested them in the woods, where he had set up several arms caches. For the purposes of secrecy, Khabarov never introduced gang members to one another and their exact number remains unknown. In order to intimidate subordinates to avoid conflicts, he threatened to kill them if they did not obey him and told them about supposed poisons and experiments with electric currents he had been conducting. Khabarov decided to choose random individuals as victims, primarily those who placed advertisements in newspapers or the Internet for the purchases of computers and their corresponding parts.

== Murders ==
=== Vlad Porfiriev ===
Khabarov committed his first known murder in the summer of 2008, the victim being 27-year-old computer repairman Vladislav Porfiriev. On the afternoon of June 8, Khabarov met with Porfiriev at the intersection of Lenin and Gagarin Streets under the pretext of offering him an odd job. Together with accomplice Sergey Kochnev, they took him to garage lot #36 on Botanicheskaya Street, where Khabarov lived. During the conversation with Porfiriev, both men suddenly attacked and bound him with duct tape and handcuffs, after which Khabarov decided to kill him using a pulse generator that he had constructed. Through the back left door of the car, Khabarov connected the wires from the device in a wooden case, 15 by 30 cm in size, to Porfiriev's left hand and leg, then closed the doors and windows of the car, plugged the device in and short-circuited the wires. As a consequence, Porfiriev received a fatal electric shock.

Khabarov and Kochnev then placed the victim's body inside the car, drove the 17th kilometer of the Yekaterinburg-Serov highway and dumped the body there. In order to destroy incriminating evidence, the pair put wooden boxes around the body and then set them on fire, with Khabarov stealing the dead man's cellphone and laptop.

After Porfiriev's remains were found, forensic specialists found a penetrating wound to the left side of his palate, possibly inflicted by a sharp object. The victim's tongue was firmly clamped between his teeth and stuck out by 1 cm; his feet were severely plantar flexed; his elbows bent and hands clenched at the chin. According to investigators, the murdered man remained alive for some time after the electrocution, after which Khabarov and Kochnev struck him in the hyoid area with an unknown sharp object to finish him off.

=== "Anton" ===
Khabarov's second known murder occurred on January 22, 2009, when he killed a 23-year-old named Anton, a fourth-year student at the Ural Institute of Finance and Law. He had gotten into contact with him after seeing an ad about selling computer accessories, and after meeting up, he convinced Anton to go his garage, with the victim unaware that Kochnev was waiting for him. In the garage, while chatting with Anton, Khabarov showed his GAI badge and claimed that he was being investigated for stealing computer parts - confused by this allegation, he voluntarily allowed for Kharabov and Kochnev to search him. Instead, they tied Anton up and put him in the car, after which they wrapped wires around his body, one end of which was connected to four large high-voltage capacitors. As a result, Anton received a fatal electric shock and died on the spot.

That same night, Khabarov and Kochnev transported the body to the outskirts of Yekaterinburg, where they dumped the body in a ditch and then set some car tires ablaze to burn the remains. Anton's skeletonized remains were discovered three months later in April 2009. His identity was confirmed after X-rays of his jaws and teeth were compared with missing persons reports, after which a criminal case was opened and an investigation into his murder was initiated.

=== Arrest, investigation, and trial ===
After analyzing the last phone calls on Anton's phone and his last known activities, investigators established that Yegor Khabarov was one of the last people to see him alive. He was detained on May 14, 2009, and after a short interrogation, implicated both himself and Kochnev as responsible for the killings of Anton and Porfiriev. The motive for the killings was supposedly homicidal mania, as Khabarov stated that he intended to record the deaths, as he felt euphoric when he saw his victims convulse and suffer during the electrocution process. Kochnev denied that he was directly involved in the murders, but admitted to being present at the crime scenes, confirmed that Khabarov seemed euphoric from watching his victims suffer and that the shocks were so powerful that the vehicles violently shaked. Kochnev claimed that after each death, Khabarov fell into what he described as a "state close to drug intoxication" and even hugged him. His explanations for his participation was due to Khabarov's short stature leaving him unable to restrain his victims on his own, suggesting that he was just there to keep them pinned down and under control.

In addition to the murders, Kochnev admitted that the pair were responsible for other crimes. He claimed that in the spring of 2008, he and Khabarov attempted to rob a young man who also was selling computer parts. The pair supposedly broke into his apartment, armed with a gun and a knife, but were violently rebuffed and forced to flee. Khabarov also claimed that he had sent other members of his gang to rob a potential victim, but the man had sensed a danger and refused to open the door - due to their failure, his disbanded the gang and started searching for new members.

According to Kochnev's testimony, shortly before his arrest, Khabarov had suggested that they kidnap, rob and murder a former employee of the Novoberezovskaya CHPP. The pair had been stalking the man for several weeks and learning his routes, but were arrested before they could carry out their plans. All members of Khabarov's gang later turned state's evidence and revealed the location of several caches Khabarov had hidden in the woods. The all described him as a prideful, arrogant man with a contempt for society at large, which Khabarov himself admitted to later on. In his conversations with investigators, he claimed people are divided into two categories: those who go with the flow, and those who are allowed to do anything, with him placing himself in the latter category.

Among Khabarov's personal belongings and documents, law enforcement officers found a traffic police certificate with notes on duty in the spring of 2009, as well as a driver's license. During the checkup it was determined that the ID was not fake and present in all databases, having been issued in 2004, despite the fact that Khabarov had been acquitted by reason of insanity for the possession and manufacturing of illegal weaponry. Despite the fact that mental illness should have prevented him from owning a driver's license, this never occurred for unknown reasons. The incident caused a public outcry, as a result, the Verkhotursk District Attorney's Office launched a separate investigation into a number of officials with the purpose of establishing the circumstances on the basis of which Khabarov, officially declared as insane, was able to obtain a permit from the Traffic Police and was not deprived of his driving privileges; however, said investigation's results were never revealed to the public.

== Khabarov's plans and devices ==
Khabarov planned meticulously for all his crimes, and after his arrest, investigators seized a number of handmade devices and walkie-talkies from his garage and apartment, all of which had been tuned into frequencies used by law enforcement. He also constructed a battery with high-powered electrical capacitators, which he used to kill Anton. To keep them in working order, Khabarov assembled a portable power station, a source of high voltage that was used to power said battery.

He also planned to ambush and attack motorists on a road leading up to Yekaterinburg, and to this end, he had purchased a hidden video camera and installed it in the soles of his boots, which he would place by the roadside and observe the passing cars from his computer at home. In order to stop the vehicles of potential victims, Khabarov assembled a microwave generator from transistors, lamps, a Tesla coil, and a magnetron from a microwave oven whose microwave rays would disable electronics and silence the engine through leaks and rubber seals in the car hood's cover, but he ultimately failed in making a workable version of this device. To conduct various experiments, he assembled a small, high-frequency generator in his apartment that he planned to improve the performance of explosions of vessels and containers containing liquid, by bringing them to bare wires under voltage and selecting a certain frequency. He also conducted experiments on creating a neuro-optical system, which would create flashes that affected parts of the brain responsible for storing memories. To this end, Khabarov assembled a device using the casing of a Soviet Luch-M photoflash which he claimed could successfully erase the subject's short-term memory, but these claims were never verified.

In addition, a homemade breaker with Tesla coils from high-energy car ignition systems powered by a car battery were found in Khabarov's apartment. This fact, according to investigators, suggested that he was searching for ways to commit murder through directly electrocuting his victims inside the car.

=== Possible additional victims ===
During the search, the investigators found a number of clues indicating that Khabarov might have been involved in five additional murders. In particular, officers found a newspaper with several advertisements for sales of computer parts that had been highlighted - several people who had supposedly wanted to buy such parts had been reported missing. Among the appliances he made was a Marx generator power supply, which could serve as a generator to charge the capacitor bank. An examination of Khabarov's notes and diaries indicated that he had been working on the Marx generator since 2006, supposedly so it could reach up to a million volts.

According to investigators, the ultimate goal of his experiments was to reach such a high voltage that it would be enough to destroy a corpse, but it only reached at around 30 kilovolts. Despite their attempts, investigators failed to link Khabarov to any additional murders or disappearances, and he steadfastly denied responsibililty, invoking his right to refuse to make self-incriminating statements. Ultimately, Khabarov and Kochnev were charged with two counts of murder, assault and robbery, as well as one count of attempted kidnapping with intent to murder.

=== Psychiatric evaluation and verdicts ===
At the request of his attorneys, Khabarov was transferred to the Sverdlovsk Regional Clinical Psychiatric Hospital to undergo a psychiatric evaluation. He was found to be insane in January 2010, and thus ordered to be placed in compulsory treatment in an intensive care hospital. Two years later, he was transported to the Serbsky Center in Moscow, where he was again tested and again found to be insane, after which he was returned to the previous facility. The head psychiatrist at the Sverdlovsk Regional Clinical Psychiatric Hospital objected to Khabarov being placed in an intensive care facility and filed an appeal against the District Court's decision, but the appeal was dismissed on July 20, 2012.

Sergey Kochnev was found guilty as an accessory to Anton's murder and sentenced to 7 years imprisonment. He was not tried for the murder of Porfiriev, as the statute of limitations had expired.

== Treatment and release ==
Following the court's verdict, Khabarov was placed in the Volgograd Psychiatric Hospital for Specialized Intensive Care, located in the Kamyshinsky District of Volgograd Oblast. He was examined every six months by a special medical commission, and in early 2017, the commission ruled that his mental health had noticeably improved. As a result, Khabarov was transferred to outpatient treatment, and not long after, he was completely discharged. Khabarov then returned to Yekaterinburg, where he registered with a psychiatrist and continued taking his prescribed medications on an outpatient basis.

=== Current status ===
Since his discharge, Khabarov has seemingly been able to adapt and has avoided legal trouble. According to one of his close associates, due to the gravity of his crimes, he leads a secluded life and tries to avoid publicity. Fearing retaliation from the victims' family members, he avoids public spaces and does not travel using public transportation. In early 2023, Khabarov took a job as a security guard at a shopping mall in Yekaterinburg, but was quickly recognized by a colleague who was a former employee at the Ministry of Internal Affairs. In the conversation that followed, Khabarov admitted responsibility for his crimes and to being treated at a mental institution, but attempted to convince the man that he no longer posed a danger to society. After the incident received widespread media coverage, Khabarov received a second wave of publicity, causing outrage among the local populace, who demanded that the local government take measures to isolate them from the criminal.

Prior to this, colleagues at the mall regarded Khabarov as a sociable, erudite person who led a healthy lifestyle, was interested in science, and liked to talk about inventions that could change the world. However, after his past was revealed, most of them shunned him, due to which Khabarov resigned of his own volition and got another position as a security guard for a private security company in Yekaterinburg. Following the mass publicity, the Sverdlovsk Department of Regional Affairs placed him under surveillance, according to State Duma deputy Andrey Alshevskikh. The officers promised that they would soon put him on a watchlist and that they would require him to submit required applications on a regular basis, as well as applying additional restrictions if necessary.

Former head duputy of the Verkhnepyshma Investigative Committee Yuri Elantsev questioned the conclusions of the psychiatric examinations, as well as the decision to release Khabarov from the intensive care facility. Elantsev stated his belief that Khabarov was sane at the time of the crimes, pointing out that he had a high IQ, meticulously prepared for the crimes, skillfully directed not only his own actions but those of his accomplice, was fully aware of his actions and took measures to conceal them, indicating that he still posed a danger to society at large. Several law enforcement officials also indicated their belief that his relatives - who are very influential in the Sverdlovsk Oblast - were likely involved in having him released.

== See also ==
- Alexander Vasilyev - another Russian mentally-ill murderer alleged to have suffered from homicidal mania
