= Ivan Garelov =

Bulgarian journalist (1943–2024)

- Иван Гарелов
- Born: 6 February 1943; Smilets, Bulgaria
- Died: 3 September 2024 (aged 81); Sofia, Bulgaria
- Occupations: Journalist; television presenter
- Spouse: Donka Stamboliyska
- Children: 2

Ivan Garelov (Bulgarian: Иван Гарелов; 6 February 1943 – 3 September 2024) was a Bulgarian journalist and television presenter.

== Life and career ==
Garelov was a graduate of Sofia University, where he studied journalism. In 1972, he joined the BNT staff, and hosted the show "Panorama" (Bulgarian: "Панорама") before being succeeded by Boyko Vasilev. Garelov worked at Nova TV and BTV. Between October 2013 and June 2014, he was the co-anchor of TV7's show "The Original" (Bulgarian: "Оригиналът") (together with Elena Yoncheva).

Garelov was married to BNR journalist Donka Stamboliyska and they had two children. He died from complications of a traumatic brain injury in Sofia, on 3 September 2024, at the age of 81.
