= Alexander Vasilyev (serial killer) =

Russian serial killer

- Born: Alexander Nikolayevich Vasilyev; 31 March 1958; Shumerlinsky District, Chuvash ASSR, RSFSR
- Died: 28 January 2020 (aged 61); Krasnoyarsk, Krasnoyarsk Krai, Russia
- Other name: "The Black Angel"
- Convictions: Murder x17 Assault x13 Lewd and lascivious acts with a minor
- Penalty: 25 years, commuted to 21 years and ten months

Details
- Victims: 17
- Span of crimes: 1997–2001
- Country: Russia
- State: Krasnoyarsk
- Date apprehended: August 2001

Alexander Nikolayevich Vasilyev (Russian: Александр Николаевич Васильев; (31 March 1958 – 28 January 2020), known as The Black Angel (Russian: Черный ангел), was a Russian serial killer who committed 17 murders in Krasnoyarsk from 1997 to 2001, out of an apparent homicidal mania. Despite the severity of his crimes, he was given a relatively lenient 25-year sentence, which was successfully reduced on appeal to 21 years and 10 months.

== Early life ==
Alexander Nikolayevich Vasilyev was born on 31 March 1958, in the Shumerlinsky District of the Chuvash ASSR, one of many children born to itinerant labourers who settled in Krasnoyarsk Krai in the mid-1960s. During his school years, Vasilyev showed no interest in learning and was thus described by teachers as a student with very mediocre intellectual abilities. After finishing the 8th grade, he enrolled in a vocational school in Krasnoyarsk, graduating in 1976 with the speciality of a mechanic/tractor operator. Shortly after this, he married a local woman and had two children with her.

In the mid-1980s, Vasilyev started exhibiting an unusually high interest in sexual activities and hypersexuality in general, due to which he started frequently watching and collecting various photos and videos depicting erotic content. In early 1989, he was arrested for sexually abusing several friends of his 5-year-old daughter, and while Vasilyev claimed he was innocent, he was nonetheless convicted of committing lewd acts on a minor. He was transferred to serve his sentence in a penal colony in Khakassia, where he was sexually assaulted by fellow inmates.

In 1992, he was paroled and returned to Krasnoyarsk, where he found work as a driver for a Kamaz automobile plant in the city.

== Arrest and exposure ==
In August 2001, Vasilyev was arrested in the neighbourhood of Solnechny for DUI. He and his acquaintances, all of whom were drunk, had been disturbing residents of some nearby apartment buildings who soon contacted the police. While examining the car, officers determined that it had been stolen and that the real owner had been killed, resulting in Vasilyev's arrest. When pressed for information, Vasilyev claimed that he killed the victim in mid-2001 and then buried his corpse in some woods on the outskirts of Krasnoyarsk.

To the shock of investigators, Vasilyev went on to confess to a further 16 murders dating back to 1997, shortly after he quit his job and experienced financial difficulties. His modus operandi consisted of posting advertisements in local newspapers looking for furniture, antiques, real estate and cars. As victims, he chose elderly and lonely pensioners and entered their apartments under the guise of wanting to purchase their products - if the circumstances were suitable for him, he would attack them. In carrying out the murders, Vasilyev brutally and sadistically tortured his victims, but in an attempt to throw off investigators, he would usually steal small amounts of money and items from the apartments. He claimed that after committing several murders in this manner, he proposed to one acquaintance that they start robbing some dachas around Krasnoyarsk, to which the latter agreed.

Throughout the summer of 2000, the pair committed a series of robbery-murders around Krasnoyarsk, with Vasilyev picking poor and vulnerable people. This annoyed his accomplice due to the small payoff their crimes netted, and during a drinking session, Vasilyev suddenly shot his accomplice and then dumped his body in the Yenisey river. Another accomplice was also killed after he left a lot of incriminating evidence during a burglary, left the house earlier than Vasilyev and was generally careless. The murders caused panic among locals and resulted in them avoiding visiting their dachas, due to which Vasilyev soon returned to posting ads in the newspapers. From the end of 2000 to mid-2001, Vasilyev murdered several cab drivers.

What would usually transpire is that Vasilyev would stop a cab and get in, give the address of a house in the suburbs of Krasnoyarsk, and then murder the driver once they reached an isolated area of the highway. Illogically, Vasilyev used the stolen cars only for a short amount of time to travel around the city and then discarded them in various different areas. Initially, he claimed that his main motive was robbery to "open his own business", but as his victims were usually poor and most of the stolen items were of low value, he was later forced to admit that he enjoyed the thrill of killing people.

During interrogations, Vasilyev told investigators of his theory that people are divided into normal and superhuman, with the latter holding more power and thus being superior to others. He described himself as such a superhuman, demanded that he be called "The Black Angel" and insisted that he killed to put the victims out of their misery, as, according to his theory, the "normal" people should be eliminated.

== Trial and aftermath ==
Ultimately, Vasilyev was accused of 17 murders and 13 assaults involving robbery, but since his crimes seemed random and without good motivation, he was ordered to undergo a psychiatric evaluation. The results of this evaluation determined that while Vasilyev was sane and aware of his actions, his below-average intelligence necessitated leniency from the court. The Krasnoyarsk Krai Prosecutor's Office demanded that he be sentenced to life imprisonment, but on 5 November 2002, the Krasnoyarsk Regional Court instead sentenced him to 25 years imprisonment.

Shortly after his conviction, Vasilyev filed several successive appeals that were eventually granted by the Krasnoyarsk Regional Court. As a result, his sentence was further commuted to 21 years and ten months imprisonment, which he had to serve at a strict-regime labour colony.

In November 2017, he was released from prison due to his terminal kidney cancer. He died from the disease on 28 January 2020.

== See also ==
- Yegor Khabarov - another Russian mentally-ill murderer alleged to have suffered from homicidal mania
- List of Russian serial killers
