= Alexey Vasilyev =

Aleksei Vasiliev or Alexey Vasilyev may refer to:

- Alexei Vasiliev (ice hockey, born 1977), Russian professional ice hockey defenceman
- Aleksei Vasiliev (ice hockey, born 1984), Russian professional ice hockey forward
- Aleksei Vasilyev (footballer) (born 1987), Russian footballer
- Aleksey Vasilyev (racing driver) (born 1972), Russian auto racing driver
- Alexei Vasiliev (historian) (born 1939), Russian Africanist, director of Institute of African Studies

== See also ==
- Aleksandr Vasilyev (disambiguation)
- Alexander Vasilyev (disambiguation)
