= Aleksandr Vasiliev (politician) =

Russian politician

Aleksandr Vasiliev Александр Васильев
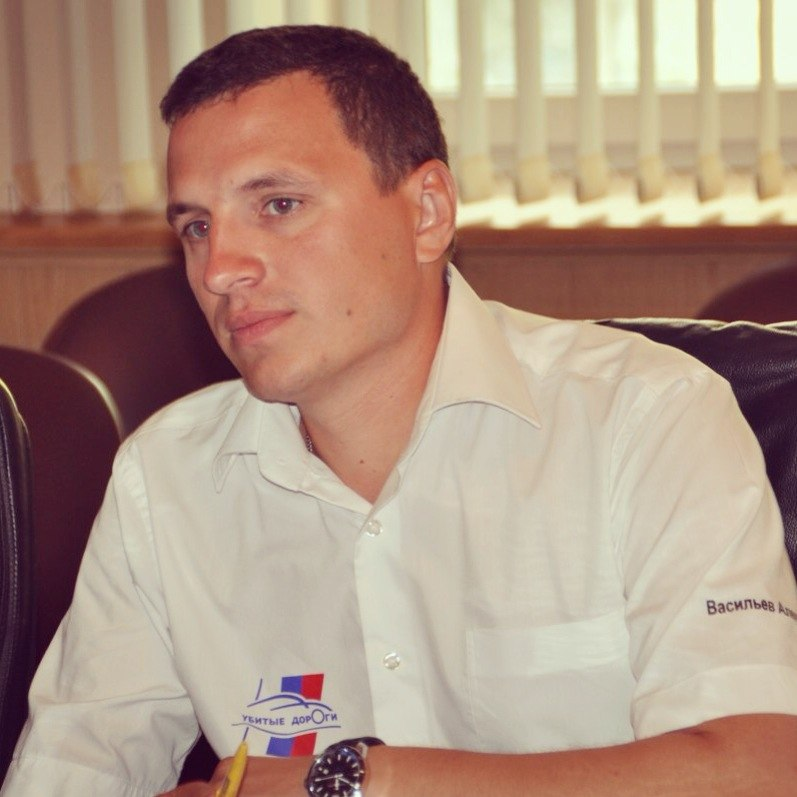
- Born: Aleksandr Nikolaevich Vasiliev; 30 March 1982 (age 44); Pskov, Soviet Union
- Education: Pskov State Polytechnic Institute
- Occupations: Politician, public figure
- Political party: ONF (All-Russia People's Front) (since 2011)
- Awards: Medal of the Order "For Merit to the Fatherland"; Ribbon of the medal 2nd class
- Website: State Duma

Aleksandr Nikolaevich Vasiliev (Russian: Александр Николаевич Васильев; born 30 March 1982) is a Russian politician and public figure. He is the leader of "Bad Roads", an interregional social movement for the improvement of the Russian transport system. He was a deputy in the Russian State Duma from 4 December 2011 until 2021.

== Biography ==
Aleksandr Vasiliev was born on 30 March 1982 in Pskov. In 1999, he began studying at the Faculty of Civil Engineering at the Pskov State Polytechnic Institute. After graduating from the institute in 2003, Vasiliev began working at the institute's scientific department as a lead engineer. In 2008, he created the "Bad Roads of Pskov" group to advocate for the improvement of roads in Pskov. The group subsequently organized several rallies to advocate for road improvement in Pskov, such as "I Pay Taxes – Where are the Roads??," "March of Empty Cans on the Bad Road," "Pedestrian Day," and "Funeral of the Pskov Roads." In 2011, Vasiliev left his job at the Pskov State Polytechnic Institute and joined the race for the State Duma as the United Russia candidate for Pskov. Running on a platform of infrastructure improvement, he helped organize the "Vladivostok-Kaliningrad" motor rally on 25 August to gain supporters and receive feedback on the condition of roads in Pskov. A report on the state of the road infrastructure and fuel prices was given to Igor Levitin, the Minister of Transport of the Russian Federation, based on the results of the rally. On 4 December Vasiliev was elected to the State Duma and became a member of the State Duma Committee on Transport.

In 2013, Vasiliev submitted drafts for several laws, including the creation of fixed warranty periods for the construction and operation of roads, the obligated digital publication of road work information, and the creation of standards to encourage responsible driving. On 12 June 2013, he joined the Central Headquarters of the All-Russia People's Front. In April 2014, President Vladimir Putin noted the effectiveness of the "Bad Roads of Pskov" movement during a live phone-in show and called for such campaigns to be launched across the rest of Russia. From June to August 2014, Vasiliev led the "Russia-2014" road expedition, which was organized by the All-Russia People's Front to evaluate how Vladimir Putin's May decrees were being implemented across Russia. A Rosatom road scanner was used during the expedition to check the condition of road surfaces. On 22 December 2014, Alexander Vasiliev presented new designs for the flag and coat of arms of the Pskov Region at a meeting of the Public Chamber of the Pskov Region, which decided to submit them to the Pskov Regional Assembly of Deputies for consideration. In 2015, Valisiev headed the "Let’s Assess the Quality of Roads!" inspection panel, which was organized by the "Bad Roads" movement and the All-Russia People's Front to inspect over one thousand roads in 130 cities across Russia. In 2016 he was re-elected to the State Duma and became a member of the Project Committee for the strategetic development of the Presidential "Safe and Quality Roads" project. In February 2017, the "Road Inspection ONF/Dead Road Map" project was created to encourage Russian citizens to suggest improvements to road policies and how the quality of roads could be improved.

== Motor sports career ==
In 2013, as a navigator, Vasiliev won the North-West Federal District Rally in the test group 1600N and the Renault Logan Cup with pilot Sergey Alekseev. On 23 January 2014, Vasiliev was awarded the Master of Sports award by KMC Russia for his achievements in motor sports. On 13 March 2018, he became a member of the Pskov motorcycle club "Positive Mechanics."

== Awards ==
On 11 October 2018, Vasiliev was awarded a medal of the Order "For Merit to the Fatherland", Class 2 for "a great contribution to the strengthening of Russian statehood, the development of parliamentarism and vigorous lawmaking."

== See also ==
- List of members of the 7th Russian State Duma
