= Pskov State University =

Public university in Pskov Oblast, Russia

- Псковский Государственной Университет
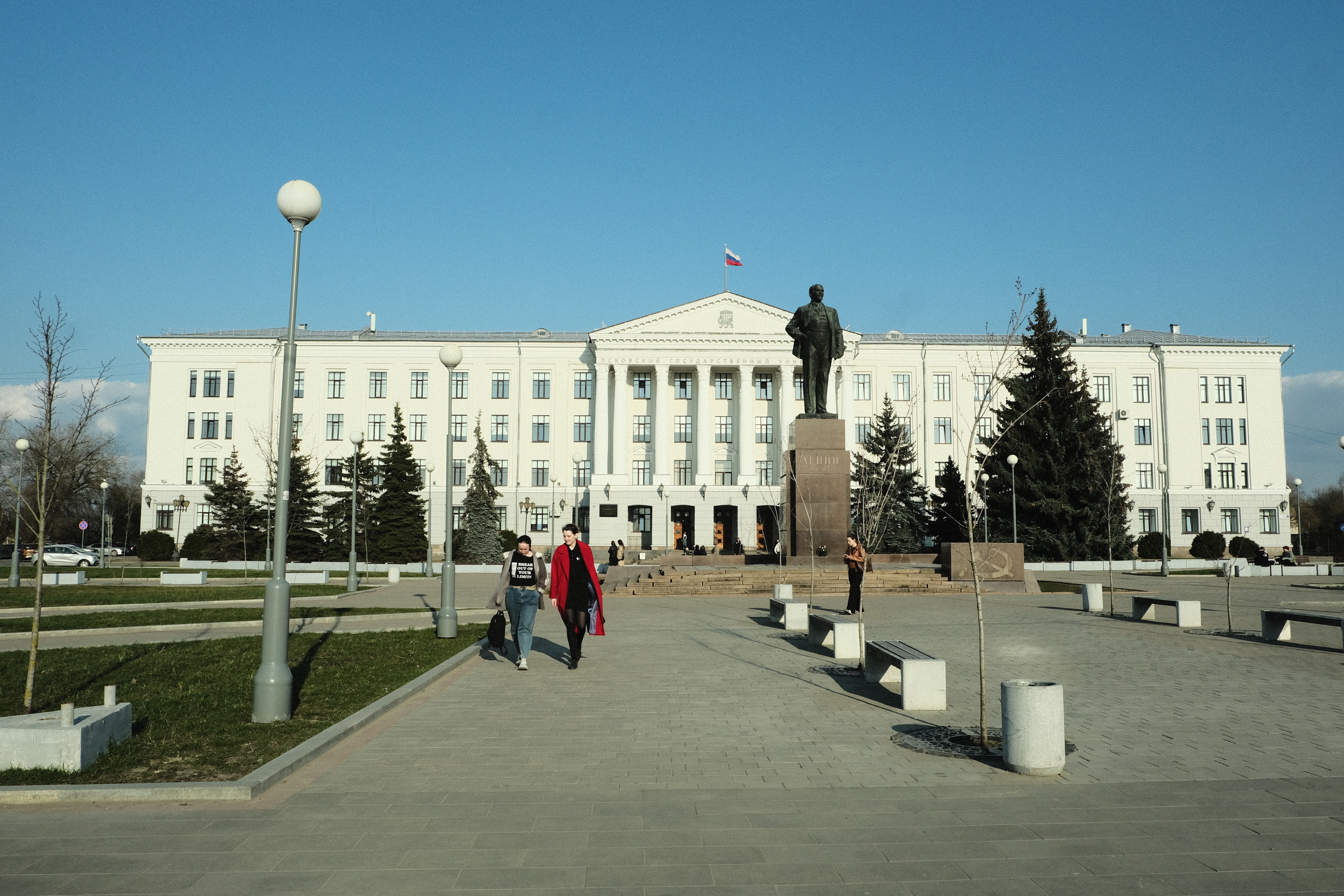
- Latin: Universitas Statalis Pscoviensis
- Motto: Iuvenum vigor scientiae
- Type: Public
- Established: 27 December 2010
- Rector: Natalia Anatolievna Ilyina
- Academic staff: 534
- Students: 10616
- Doctoral students: 19
- Other students: International students 1300
- Location: 2, Lenin square, Pskov, Russia; 57°48′55″N 28°20′36″E
- Website: www.pskgu.ru

Pskov State University (Russian: Псковский Государственной Университет) is a public university in the Pskov Region of Russia. It is one of the 33 flagship universities in Russia. Pskov SU was established in 2010 by several other educational institutions in the region.

== History ==
Pskov SU was formed on 14 October 2011 by the merger of Pskov State Pedagogical University (PSPU), Pskov State Polytechnic Institute, the Technical College of Construction in Velikiye Luki, Pskov College of Construction and Economics, and Pskov Industrial Technical school.

In April 2017, Pskov SU became one of the regional flagship universities.

=== Pskov State Pedagogical University ===
==== Russian Empire era ====
PSPU started on September 1, 1874, with the opening of the Pskov Male Teachers' Training college. In October 1909, a new secondary educational institution opened for training teachers for urban schools and primary schools of the Russian Ministry of National Education.

==== Soviet Union era ====
In October 1919, the teacher's training college and teacher's institute were merged into the Institute of National Education (INE) to train teachers of primary and secondary schools and political education workers. In 1923, INE was transformed into a pedagogical college - a secondary educational institution to train teachers of primary schools and employees of preschool and political, educational institutions. On May 7, 1932, the Pskov Pedagogical institute was opened. For two years, the university and institute shared the same building and director, Nikolai Vladimirovich Falyutinsky.

In 1934, the Pskov Pedagogical Institute moved to a separate building and administration. The university was transformed into a two-year teachers’ institute for the training of teachers of seven-year schools was opened. The previous departments were transformed into faculties. The university had two faculties - physico-mathematical and natural sciences. In 1935, the Soviet government added the name of Sergei Mironovich Kirov to the name of the Pskov Pedagogical Institute.

In 1936, the first classes graduated from the pedagogical and teaching institutes. There were 933 graduates in total before 1941. On July 8, 1941, during the German invasion of the USSR, institute employees fled Pskov to Kirov. The institutes suspended operations until the end of World War II. By the end of the war, the facilities for the two institutes had been almost completely destroyed. In May 1945, the Soviet Government started rebuilding the institutes, starting with four faculties: physico-mathematical, natural sciences, history, and literature. In 1952, the teacher's institute was disbanded.

In 1956, the institute inaugurated a five-year term of study and started to train teachers. In 1957, the Vyborg Pedagogical Institute in Vyborg, Russia, was merged into the Pskov Pedagogical Institute. The number of teachers increased by 100 people, and the number of students by more than 1,000. On June 15, 1963, the faculty of foreign languages was established.

In 1970, the Pedagogical Institute in Velikiye Luki was merged into the Pskov Pedagogical Institute. In 1977 a Faculty of Primary Classes was established. On August 10, 1982, the institute received the Order of the Badge of Honour from the Presidium of the Supreme Soviet of the USSR.

==== Russian Federation era ====
In 1997, the Faculty of Technology and Entrepreneurship was established. On March 22, the institute was rename Pskov State Pedagogical University. In December 2007, PSPU was recognized by President Vladimir Putin "for achievements in scientific and pedagogical activities and a great contribution to the training of qualified specialists". In 2011, PSPU was merged with the other schools to become Pskov SU.

On December 27, 2010, Russian Prime Minister Vladimir Putin issued resolution No. 2440-r establishing Pskov State University. It was to be established on the basis of five educational institutions: Kirov Pskov State Pedagogical University, Pskov State Polytechnic Institute, Pskov Industrial Technical School, Pskov College of Construction and Economics, and Velikiye Luki Construction College;; On April 7, 2011, Order No. 1465 of the Ministry of Education and Science of the Russian Federation was issued "On the establishment of the federal state budgetary educational institution of higher professional education "Pskov State University". Deputy Governor of the Pskov Region, Yuri Anatolyevich Demyanenko, was appointed rector of the newly formed Pskov State University for a term of one year. On October 14, 2011, Pskov State University (PskovSU) was included in the register of state institutions. October 14 is now the founding day of the new university, Pskov State University. The opening ceremony of PskovSU was held on October 25, 2011.

=== Pskov State Polytechnic Institute ===
Main article: Pskov State Polytechnic Institute

Pskov State Polytechnic Institute was the first higher technical institution in the Pskov Oblast. It was established in 1960 as a training and consulting post of the North-West Extramural Polytechnic Institute. On the 8th of July, it became a branch of Leningrad Polytechnic Institute. It was renamed the Pskov branch of Leningrad State Technical University in 1990. In 1994, the Pskov branch was renamed as Pskov Polytechnic Institute, a branch of what was now Saint Petersburg State Technical University. IN 2004, the institute became a separate school until 2011, when it merged with other schools to become Pskov SU.

=== Technical School of Construction ===
The school started in 1952 as the Sebezh School of Construction Masters in Sebezh, Russia. In 1956, the school was transferred to Velikie Luki and renamed the Construction Technical School in Velikiye Luki. From 1980 to 1994, the department Production of construction parts and reinforced concrete structures trained technicians for the construction industry. Since 1989, the department Construction, Operation, and Repair of Roads and Airfields trained specialists in road design, construction, operation, and repair of roads.

In 1993, on the basis of the order of the Ministry of Agriculture and Food of the Russian Federation No. 707, the Technical School was renamed Construction College in Velikie Luki. Since 1994, the Management department trained managers for administrative, managerial, and entrepreneurial activities in various sectors of the construction industry.

In 2011, the Technical School of Construction was merged into the new Pskov SU.

=== Pskov College of Construction and Economics ===
On 15 June 1966, Pskov Construction Technical School started working on the basis of the order of the Ministry of Construction of the RSFSR No. 76 of 10.06.1966. In 1991, the Technical School was transformed into the College of Construction and Economics by the order of the State Committee of the RSFSR on Architecture and Construction No. 59 of 26.11.1991. Until 1989, the College recruited only two specialties: Construction and maintenance of buildings and structures with the qualification civil engineer; Planning in construction with the qualification planner technician.

550 planners and 630 construction technicians were trained at the extramural courses only for construction trusts of house-building plants in Leningrad and Leningrad Region.

=== Pskov Industrial Technical School ===
Pskov Civil Engineering College of the Ministry of Housing and Civil Engineering of the RSFRS was organized on the basis of the Decree of the Council of Ministers of the USSR No. 57006 of 30 April 1946 and the Order of the Ministry of Higher Education of the USSR No. 24 of 15 May 1946. The first student enrolment was made on 1 September 1946. On 31 March 1955, the Technical School of Civil Engineering was renamed into Pskov Construction Technical School and became subordinate to the Department of Educational Institutions of Leningrad Regional Economic Soviet.

By the Resolution of the Regional Economic Soviet of the Leningrad Economic-Administrative Region No. 476-УК of 17.06.1958, Pskov Construction Technical School and Pskov Machine-Building Technical School were united into one Pskov Industrial Technical School, on the basis of Construction Technical School. Pskov Industrial Technical School was renamed the state educational institution Pskov Industrial Technical School by the order of 24 January 1996 No. 2-204 / 9 of the State Committee of the Russian Federation for Defense Sectors of Industries. The state educational institution Pskov Industrial Technical School was renamed into the state educational institution of secondary vocational education Pskov Industrial College by the order of the Ministry of Education of Russia of 28 July 1997 No. 1671.

== Modern university ==
Pskov SU has a multilevel system of higher education:

- Bachelor's degree (4 years or 5 years);
- Specialist's degree (5 or 6 years);
- Master's degree (2 years);
- Postgraduate studies (3 or 4 years).

Pskov SU has 149 educational programs, including 76 Bachelor's degree training programs, 45 Master's degree training programs, 9 specialist's degree training programs, 19 training programs of scientific-pedagogical staff in postgraduate studies, 38 specialties of secondary vocational training, and also more than 100 programs of further education.

Pskov State University College in Pskov and Pskov State University branch in Velikiye Luki train middle-ranking specialists in secondary vocational education. Since 2013, the Faculty of Engineering and Economics has been opened at the branch of Pskov State University in Velikiye Luki, where training is carried out according to bachelor's degree programs.

The Institute of Life-Long Education implements supplementary educational programs for children and adults, further education programs in the form of occupational retraining, advanced training, seminars, and masterclasses.

• The basic professional educational program of the bachelor's degree in the field of study 18.03.02 of Energy and resource-saving processes in chemical technology, petrochemistry, and biotechnology has been developed together with the "anchor" resident of the Special economic zone of industrial and production type Moglino Titan-Polimer LLC;

• The basic professional educational program in the field of study of advertising and public relations, specialization Communication Technologies has been developed in cooperation with the National Research University Higher School of Economics and the Pskov Region Media Holding;

• New master's degree programs have been developed following the results of the program of advanced training and competitive selection conducted together with the Institute of Education of the National Research University Higher School of Economics: specialization Philology and Communicative Practices (field of study Philology); specialization Legal regulation of the digital economy (field of study Jurisprudence).

== Structure ==
The university has moved to a new academic structure, from 11 faculties to 6 multidisciplinary institutes created under the main directions of the development of educational programs, federal and regional requests. Partners for each institute have been identified and are working with them to develop joint educational programs. The new academic structure includes 6 institutes and 34 academic departments, the branch in the city of Velikiye Luki, Pskov State University College, Institute of Life Long Education, Center of the Russian Language and Culture named after E.A. Maimin.

Institutes and academic departments:

1) Institute of Medicine and Experimental Biology (main partners ˗˗ Siberian State Medical University, North-West State Medical University named after I. I. Mechnikov, Federal State Budgetary Educational Institution National Medical Research Center named after V.A. Almazov) and Natural-geographical faculty (main partners Moscow State University, University of Tartu, Estonia):

Medical faculty:

• Department of Fundamental Medicine and Biochemistry

• Department of Medical Informatics and Cybernetics

• Department of Clinical Medicine

Natural-geographical faculty:

• Department of Botany and Plant Ecology

• Department of Geography

• Department of Zoology and Animal Ecology

• Department of Chemistry

2) Institute of Mathematical Modeling and Game Practice (main partners ˗˗ Institute of Education of National Research University Higher School of Economics, Game practitioners Guild) :

• Department of Mathematics and Game Theory

• Department of Applied Informatics and Modeling

• Department of Physics

• Department of Design

3) Institute of Engineering Sciences (main partners ˗˗ Riga Technical University, Latvia, Peter the Great St. Petersburg Polytechnic University):

• Department of Engineering Technology and Techno sphere Safety

• Department of Electric Power, Electric Drive and Automation Systems

• Department of Architecture and Construction

• Department of Road Transport

• Department of Information and Communication Technologies

4 Institute of Humanities and Language Communication (main partners ˗˗ State Academic University for the Humanities, Institute for US and Canadian Studies of the Russian Academy of Sciences) and Faculty of the Russian Philology and Foreign Languages (main partners ˗˗ Daugavpils University, Latvia, University of Wroclaw, Poland) :

- Faculty of History

• Department of Russian History

• Department of World History and Regional Studies

• Department of Philosophy and Theology

- Faculty of the Russian Philology and Foreign Languages

• Department of Philology, Communication and Russian as a Foreign Language

• Department of European Languages and Cultures

• Department of Foreign Languages for Non-Linguistic Departments

5) Institute of Law, Economics and Management (main partners ˗˗ Peter the Great St. Petersburg Polytechnic University):

• Department of Economics, Finance and Financial Law

• Department of Management and Administrative Law

• Department of National Security and Human Rights

• Department of Civil Law and Procedure

• Department of Law Enforcement, Criminal Law and Procedure

• Department of State Law Disciplines and Theory of Law

6) Institute of Education and Social Sciences (main partner ˗˗ Herzen State Pedagogical University) :

• Department of Psychology and Child Development Support

• Department of Technology for Working with People with Special Needs

• Department of Health and Physical Development

• Department of Secondary General Education and Social Design

• Department of Theory and Methods of Preschool and Primary Education

• Laboratory of Technological Culture

Interfaculty Department of Physical Culture

Department of secondary vocational education of Pskov State University College

Department of secondary vocational education of Pskov State University branch in Velikiye Luki

== Infrastructure ==
Pskov State University has 13 educational and laboratory buildings with a total area of more than 28,5 thousand m^{2} The bases of practice of Pskov State University are located in different districts of the Pskov region, each of which is characterized by a special flora, fauna or geological or historical-cultural peculiarities.

The university has its own printing office. The printing office produces more than 450 units of scientific products per year with a general circulation of about 40,000 copies. PskovSU has 3 assembly halls, including a separate building of the Center for Student Initiatives with a large conference hall. A building for the new campus was purchased on the banks of Velikaya River. The library stock of Pskov State University has more than 900 thousand copies of printed publications of educational, methodical, scientific, reference and other literature necessary for library and information support of educational programs.

Users of PskovSU library have access to the IPRbooks Electronic Library System, the Electronic Library System of the publishing house Lan, the Electronic Library System Student Consultant, the Electronic Library System Urait and other databases, the bulletin of new revenues, virtual exhibitions, receive all necessary information about the activities and cultural and educational activities of PskovSU Library.

== Activities ==
In 2019, the Ministry of Science and Higher Education of the Russian Federation announced a competition for grants in the form of subsidies for the project Citizens Training in Life Long Education Programs in Educational Organizations Implementing Additional Educational Programs and Professional Training Programmes of the federal project New Opportunities for Everyone.

The Ministry of Education of the Russian Federation conducted a competitive selection for the provision of grants from the federal budget in the form of subsidies for the implementation of measures aimed at the full functioning and development of the Russian language of the departmental special-purpose program Scientific, methodological and personnel support to the Russian language and languages of the peoples of the Russian Federation of the subprogramme Improvement of the management of the education system of the state program of the Russian Federation Development of Education.

Pskov State University won a grant from the federal budget during the competitive selection, which was organized by the Ministry of Education of the Russian Federation. The grant was provided for the implementation of the event Carrying out thematic shifts in seasonal camps for schoolchildren in the advanced fields of discrete mathematics, informatics, digital technology within the framework of the federal project Personnel for digital economy of the national program Digital economy of the state program Development of education.

Also, Pskov State University is a platform for public events. Thus, in 2019, 3 international and 1 regional events were held: International research-to-practice conference Northern Europe, Pskov and the Hanseatic Union in the past and present; the Second International research-to-practice conference dedicated to the 75th Anniversary of the Victory in the Great Patriotic War Without Limitation Periods; the Second International research-to-practice conference Borderless World: Russian as a foreign language in the international educational space vol. 2.0; The Second Pskov Mediaforum.

=== International collaboration ===
The university is a member of the University of the Arctic. UArctic is an international cooperative network based in the Circumpolar Arctic region, consisting of more than 200 universities, colleges, and other organizations with an interest in promoting education and research in the Arctic region. The collaboration has been paused after the beginning of the Russo-Ukrainian War in 2022.

== Student life ==
A regional volunteer center Volunteer Resource Center has been established on the basis of Pskov State University. The participants of the centre carry out their activities both at the university and abroad. Students implement themselves in the field of public relations on the basis of student television Youth TV, Universants newspaper and newspapers created at some faculties.

There is the War-History Club at the university for those who are interested in history. Also, public associations of the Russian Geographical Society and Imperial Russian Historical Society have been established and operate on the basis of Pskov State University.

== Cooperation ==
Pskov State University is a member of a number of major international networks, including the University of the Arctic, the Baltic University Programs, the Partner Network of Universities of the Baltic Sea Region, the Hanseatic Economic Union and some others.

Pskov State University implements 6 international scientific and educational projects, as well as establishes partnerships with 77 universities from 22 countries and 15 Russian universities.

One of the important areas of cooperation between Pskov State University and foreign partners is conducting joint research and implementing scientific and educational projects. The projects are financed in the framework of international programs. The purpose of such projects is to attract financial resources to implement scientific ideas and promote research results at the international level.

Pskov State University is distinguished for its active work in the sphere of international activity.
