= Boyko Vasilev =

Boyko Vassilev Petrov
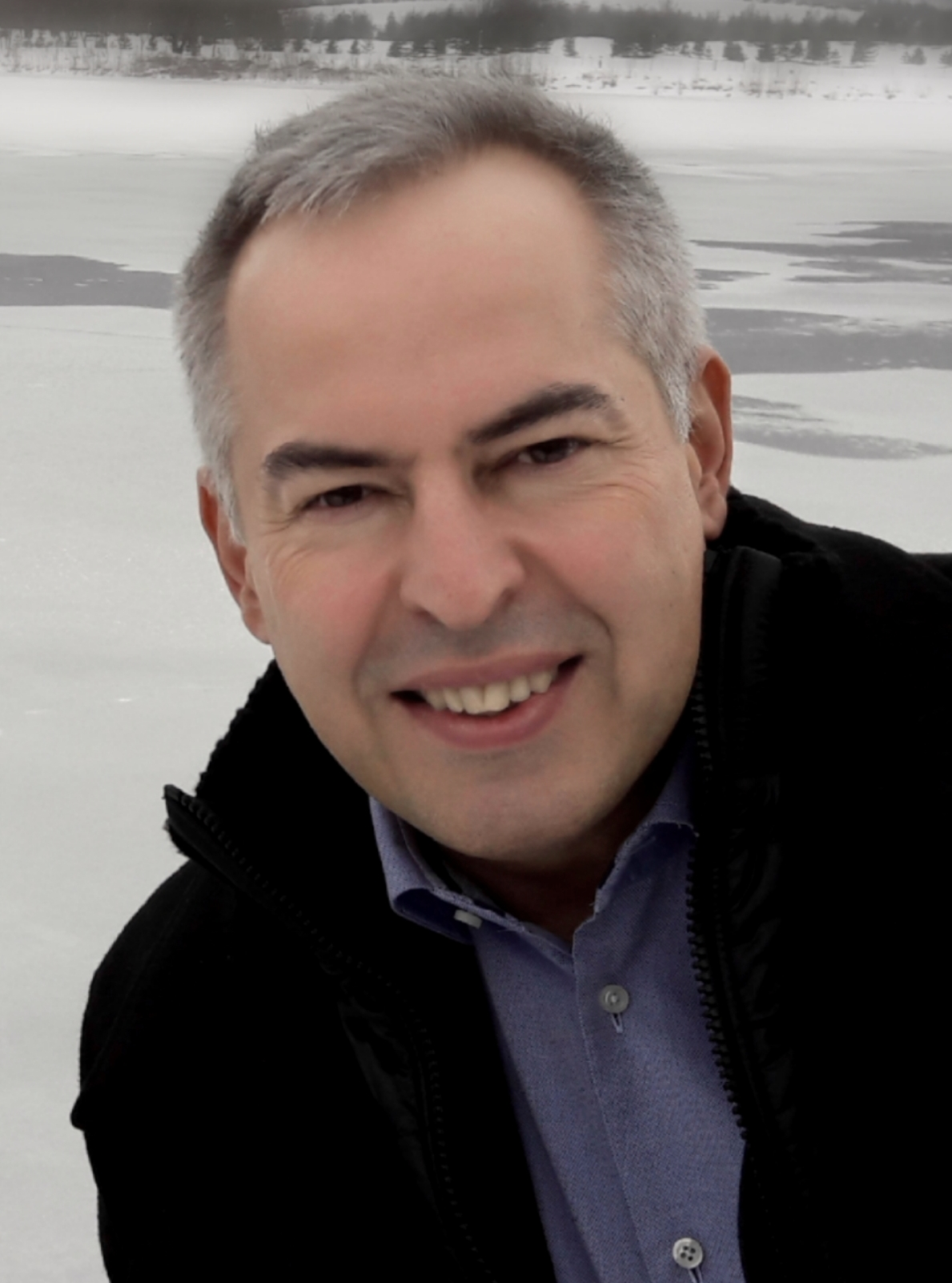

Personal details
- Born: 9 January 1970 (age 56) Pernik, Bulgaria
- Spouse: Albena Kolchakova
- Profession: journalist, television presenter

Boyko Vassilev Petrov (Bulgarian: Бойко Василев Петров) (born on 9 January 1970) is a Bulgarian journalist who is the producer and presenter of the weekly TV show Panorama that airs on Bulgarian National Television.

== Biography ==
Vassilev was born January 9, 1970, in Pernik, Bulgaria. In 1989, he graduated from the 91st German Language High School in Sofia. He was awarded a golden medal, an honorary diploma of the Ministry of Education and won first place in the School National Olympiad of Literature. That same year, he was admitted to the University of Sofia's faculty of Journalism, graduating in 1994.

In 2001, Vassilev presented his PhD thesis in sociology, which was validated by the Supreme Attestation Commission. The topic of the dissertation was “The New Media and Utopian Perspective”; it was released also as a book. He has participated in many qualification courses that include German language and culture in Heidelberg (1993), TV journalism in Cardiff (1993) and the Henri Nannen Journalism School in Hamburg (1997).

As a student, Vassilev did freelance work for various publications and media: the newspapers Pogled and 1000 days, the Hristo Botev programme of Bulgarian National Radio and the weekly science program Eureka on Channel 2 of Bulgarian National Television (BNT). He presented four editions of the television show Formula 5 on Channel 1 of BNT. Vassilev became part of “Coo-Coo” students’ program where he authored the Nubia episode. In 1992, he started as a reporter at Po sveta i u nas (“Home and abroad”), the prime time news show of Channel 1 of BNT, covering topics in the field of foreign policy and justice.

In 1993, Vassilev acquired a full-time job at the central weekly survey Panorama of BNT and made a name for himself as an expert in the Balkans. He was active in reporting major events on the peninsula – the Bosnian war (1994–95) and Kosovo war (1998–99), the NATO bombing of Yugoslavia (1999) and events in Macedonia (2001). Vassilev provided regular commentary on international topics in the framework of Panorama. In addition, he presented several editions of the show, filling in as a host for Ivan Garelov.

In September 2000, Vassilev became the lead presenter and producer of Panorama, while at different moments also serving as chief editor of current affairs and head of news. Together with his main occupation, he also filmed reports and documentaries. Since 2010, he has produced series on international topics for "The World Live" segment („Светът на живо”). He covered the Syrian war (2012) and Iraq (2015).

== Documentaries ==
Vassilev has produced many documentaries, including The Vengeance Day, about the war in Kosovo (1999), The Bullet Train, Island Song (Japan – 2004), Eyes Not Forgotten (2004), The Elder Brother, about St. Methodius (2005), Fathers’ Children, about the descendants of the Fathers of Europe (2007), Liberation Square (Egypt – 2011), Mark’s Way (Albania – 2011), 20 Years Later (Bosnia – 2011), Cathedral and Mosque (Germany – 2012), Boiling Point (Syria – 2012), Airport for Nowhere (N. Karabakh – 2012), The Walls of Europe (2014), Guardians of Shadows (2014), The Autumn of Auld Songs (together with Polly Zlatareva, in Scotland and Catalonia, 2014), The Star of the Magi (together with Polly Zlatareva, 2014), Battlefield (Iraqi Kurdistan, 2015), The Great Powers (2015), The Wave (the refugee issue in Germany – 2016), American Judge (2016) and Walking of Wonders, about St. Clement of Ohrid (2016).

== Interviews ==
Throughout his career, Vassilev has interviewed many prominent international leaders such as George W. Bush, Tony Blair, Gerhard Schröder, José María Aznar, Recep Tayyip Erdoğan among others. He has also interviewed prominent people like Umberto Eco, David Lynch, Jean-Michel Jarre, David Baldacci, George Soros, Paul Krugman and Mo Yan.

== Awards ==
For his work Vassilev has been awarded multiple times:

- 1997 -The Prize for TV reporting of the Union of Bulgarian journalists
- 1998 -First place in Bulgaria for TV commentary
- 1999 -The Golden Riton for The Vengeance Day documentary
- 1999 -Winner of the Annual Article Award from the Free & Democratic Bulgaria Foundation
- 2000 -Special Award of Sarajevo TV Festival for The Vengeance Day documentary
- 2003 -Robert Schumann Award for reporting EU issues
- 2004 -Robert Schumann Award for reporting EU issues (second time)
- 2007 -Robert Schumann Award for reporting EU issues (third time)
- 2012 -Honored with BENE MERITO medal of Foreign Ministry of Poland
- 2015 -Mtel Media Masters Award for television
- 2016 -Honored with la Cruz de Oficial del Mérito Civil medal of King of Spain
- 2016 -Sarajevo, Manager of the year: awarded person of the year in media in Eastern and Central Europe

Vassilev is the Vice-President of the St. Cyril and St. Methodius International Foundation and a member of the Board of Institute for International and Regional Studies in Sofia. He is fluent in English, German, Spanish, Russian, Serbian, Croatian, Bosnian and understands French.
