= Alexandre Vassiliev =

Russian fashion historian, collector, TV host and author

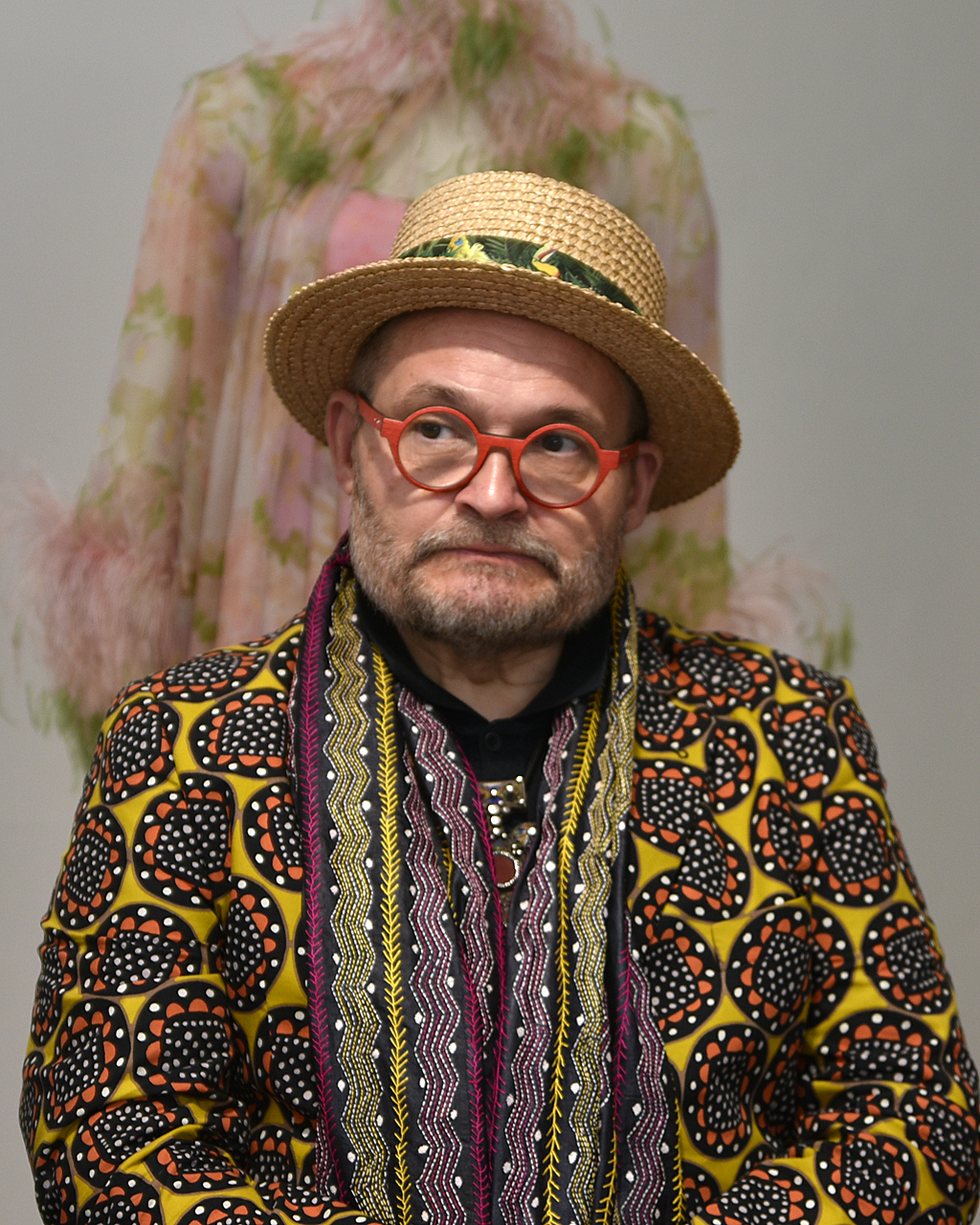
- Alexandre Vassiliev (2023)
- Born: Alexandre Alexandrovich Vassiliev; December 8, 1958 (age 67); Moscow
- Citizenship: Soviet Union →Russia, France, Lithuania
- Education: Moscow Art Theatre School
- Occupations: art critic, TV presenter

Alexandre Alexandrovich Vassiliev (Russian: Александр Александрович Васильев; born December 8, 1958, Moscow) is a Russian fashion historian, collector, TV host and author of best selling books. He is an honorary member of the Russian Academy of Arts and founder of the International Interior Prize.

== Biography ==
Vassiliev was born into a family of theater professionals: his father, Alexander Pavlovich Vassiliev (1911–1990), was a theater artist and People's Artist of the RSFSR; his mother, Tatyana Ilyinichna Gulevich (1924–2003), was a dramatic actress and professor of stage speech.

From an early age, he was passionate about creating costumes and sets. In 1981, he graduated from the production faculty of the Moscow Art Theater School and subsequently worked as a costume designer at the Theater on Malaya Bronnaya, Moscow, Russia,.

In 1982, he moved to Paris, where he worked as a decorator for various French theaters and festivals, including Rond-Point on the Champs-Élysées, the Opéra Bastille Studio, Lucernaire, Cartoucherie, the Avignon Festival, Ballet du Nord, Jeune Ballet de France, and the Royal Opera of Versailles.

Since 1994, he has lectured and conducted master classes at various universities and colleges worldwide.

In 2000, under his leadership, the "Volga Seasons of Alexandre Vassiliev" Fashion and Theater Costume Festival was held in Samara, Russia.

Since 2002, he has worked on the television channel Kultura, Rusia as the author and host of the program Breath of the Century.

From November 23, 2009, to March 3, 2022, he was the permanent host of the program "Fashion Verdict" on Channel One, Russia.

From 2009 to 2012, he served as the scientific director of the Moscow Academy of Fashion at the Moscow Institute of Television and Radio Broadcasting Ostankino, In 2012–2013, he worked as a course instructor in the Faculty of Design and Fashion.

In 2009, he defended his PhD dissertation "Beauty in Exile: The Work of Russian Émigré Artists of the First Wave" at the Faculty of Philosophy of Moscow State University under the supervision of Professor T. V. Kuznetsova.

Since 2012, he has collaborated with Radio Mayak, participating in various programs. In 2013, he hosted the series "Portraits of Great Fashion Icons"., In 2013, he was the host of the program series "Portraits of Great Fashion Icons."

In 2014, he became the author and lead lecturer of an educational course at the moda.ru fashion school.

In 2019, he was appointed associate professor at the Faculty of Philosophy at Moscow State University, where he has been leading the Theory and Industry of Fashion educational program since 2000.

Since 2020, he has been an ambassador for the educational project "Aristocracy", dedicated to traditional folk arts and crafts.

== Theatrical work ==
Alexandre Vassiliev has designed over 100 theater productions in 25 countries worldwide, creating costumes and sets for operas, ballets, and dramatic performances. He has collaborated with the National Theatre (London), the Scottish Ballet (Glasgow), the Ballet of Flanders (Brussels), as well as ballet companies in Japan, the United States, and Chile.

In 2021, he was invited by the Paris Opera to design costumes and props based on the sketches of Nicholas Roerich for the revival of Vaslav Nijinsky's ballet The Rite of Spring.

In Russia, productions featuring Vassiliev's designs are staged at the Moscow Operetta Theatre, the Stanislavsky and Nemirovich-Danchenko Moscow Music Theatre, the Pushkin Theatre, and opera houses in Novosibirsk, Samara, and Rostov-on-Don.

== Collection ==
Alexandre Vassiliev owns one of the world's largest private collections of historical costumes, which he has been expanding since 1985. The collection comprises several tens of thousands of items, including clothing, accessories, paintings, and photographs related to fashion history. The European portion of the collection is stored in Visaginas, Lithuania, as well as in Paris, while the Russian and Soviet sections are housed in Moscow.

A special highlight of the collection is a series of costumes once belonging to renowned singers, actresses, and ballerinas, including Alla Pugacheva, Lyudmila Gurchenko, Lyubov Orlova, Lyudmila Zykina, Galina Volchek, Elena Obraztsova, Irina Ponarovskaya, Alla Demidova, Natalia Durova, Irina Skobtseva, Olga Lepeshinskaya, Ekaterina Maximova, Nadezhda Rumyantseva, Olga Voronets, Alisa Koonen, Yevdokiya Turchaninova, Antonina Nezhdanova, Lidia Smirnova, Galina Ulanova, and Natalia Fateeva. Many of these items were displayed at the Tsaritsyno Museum-Reserve's Bread House as part of the exhibition Fashion Behind the Iron Curtain: From the Wardrobes of Soviet Era Stars, which was also published as an illustrated catalog.

The Alexandre Vassiliev Foundation's collection has grown thanks to notable contributions, including the wardrobe of 1920s Folies Bergère cabaret star Halinka Dorszówna, who granted Vassiliev access to her personal collection of vintage couture. In the mid-1980s, actor Alexander Arbat-Kurepov donated six beaded evening gowns from the 1920s, made by the fashion house Kitmir, founded by Grand Duchess Maria Pavlovna, as well as a 1946 Lanvin dress that once belonged to Russian émigré actress Claude Genia. The collection's largest acquisition came from the Samsonov family: Vassiliev obtained the wardrobe of Tatyana Nikitichna Samsonova-Nalbandova (1885–1971), owner of the Petrovskaya Vodka factories, who emigrated from Moscow to Paris in 1913 and preserved her entire pre-revolutionary wardrobe intact.

Another significant contribution came from legendary ballerina Maya Plisetskaya, who donated several of her dresses designed by Pierre Cardin and Chanel. After she died her husband Rodion Shchedrin offered Vassiliev an additional selection of Plisetskaya's wardrobe for the collection.

Items from Vassiliev's collection have been exhibited in Australia, Europe, Asia, and the Americas. One of the most recent large-scale projects was the Russia: Its Style and Soul exhibition, presented in Dubai to support Moscow's bid to host Expo 2030, organized in collaboration with the Moscow Department of Culture. In 2021, the Geneva Museum of Art and History hosted the highly successful exhibition Playing to the Public: Fashion and Portraits from Vassiliev's collection, featuring garments by couturiers such as Charles Frederick Worth, Paul Poiret, Coco Chanel, Christian Dior, Paco Rabanne, André Courrèges, and Oleg Cassini.

A complete list of exhibitions from the Alexandre Vassiliev Foundation's collection is available on the fashion historian's official website.

== Recognition ==
- 1998 – Winner of the TOBAV Award (Turkey, twice)
- 2010 – Nominated for Fashion Legend at the World Fashion Awards.
- 2011 – Recipient of the "People's Recognition" regional award of the Samara Region, Russia
- 2011 – Granted honorary membership in the Russian Academy of Arts, (France)
- 2016 – Awarded the Ordre des Arts et des Lettres, (France)
- 2018 – Awarded the Cross of Recognition IV Class (Latvia)
- Medal of Sergei Diaghilev – For the promotion of Russian art.
- Medal of Vaslav Nijinsky
- Order of the Patron of the Arts
- Gold Medal of the Russian Academy of Arts
