= Steven A. Vasilev =

- Born: (born 1954)
- Education: University of Southern California, UCLA Anderson School of Management
- Occupations: Gynecologic Oncologist, Professor and Director of Integrative Medicine and Gynecologic Oncology
- Years active: 1984 - present
- Employer: John Wayne Cancer Institute-Providence Saint John’s Health Center
- Known for: Surgical innovation, robotic minimally invasive surgery, integrative medicine

Steven A. Vasilev (born July 17, 1954) is an American gynecologist, specializing in gynecologic oncology. He has served as Professor and Director of Integrative Medicine and Gynecologic Oncology at John Wayne Cancer Institute-Providence Saint John’s Health Center, Professor at John Wayne Cancer Institute in Santa Monica, California, and Professor at Loma Linda University School of Medicine faculty. Vasilev is a proponent of minimally invasive (laparoscopic) and robotic cancer surgery and complex pelvic surgery and has published research on medical and surgical therapies, integrative medicine, and screening for cervical cancer and human papilloma virus (HPV)

== Education ==
Vasilev received his MD degree from Keck School of Medicine, University of Southern California and completed his residency in obstetrics and gynecology at Los Angeles County USC School of Medicine. He served as a fellow in gynecologic oncology at University of Southern California Norris Cancer Center, and has an MBA degree from UCLA Anderson School of Management.

== Publications ==
=== Bibliography ===
- Cancer Cureology: The Ultimate Survivor's Holistic Guide: Integrative Natural Anti-Cancer Answer: The Science and Truth. DrBookPublishing. 2016. ISBN 978-1-94-206513-5.
- Gynecologic Oncology: Evidence-Based Perioperative and Supportive Care. Wiley Publishers. 2011. ISBN 978-0-470-08340-6.

=== Selected articles ===
- Mirza MR, Monk BJ, Herrstedt J, et al. Niraparib Maintenance Therapy in Platinum-Sensitive, Recurrent Ovarian Cancer. NEJM. 2016;375(22):2154-2164. PMID 27717299
- Winter M, Cestero RM, Burg A, Felix JC, Han C, Raffo AM, Vasilev S. Fabric-based exocervical and endocervical biopsy in comparison with punch biopsy and sharp curettage. J Low Genit Tract. 2012;16(2):80-7. PMID 22371040
- Mahdavi A, Tajalli TR, Dalmar A, Vasilev SA, Lentz SE, Berman ML. Role of adjuvant chemotherapy in patients with early stage uterine papillary serous cancer. Int J Gynecol Cancer. 2011;21(8):1436-40. PMID 21997174
- Mahdavi A, Monk BJ, Ragazzo J, Hunter MI, Lentz SE, Vasilev SA, Tewari KS. Pelvic radiation improves local control after hysterectomy for uterine leiomyosarcoma: a 20-year experience. Int J Gynecol Cancer. 2009; 19(6):1080-4. PMID 19820372
- Morgan RJ Jr, Synold TW, Gandara D, et al. Phase II trial of carboplatin and infusional cyclosporine with alpha-interferon in recurrent ovarian cancer: a California Cancer Consortium Trial. Int J Gynecol Cancer. 2007; 17(2):373-8. PMID 17362315
- Wang J, Wieslander C, Hansen G, Cass I, Vasilev S, Holschneider CH. Thin endometrial echo complex on ultrasound does not reliably exclude type 2 endometrial cancers. Gynecol Oncol. 2006;101(1):120-5. PMID 16307792
- McGonigle KF, Smith DD, Marx HF, et al. Uterine effects of tamoxifen: a prospective study. Int J Gynecol Cancer. 2006;16(2):814-20. PMID 16681767
