= Vasil Vasilev =

Vasil Vasilev may refer to:

- Vasil Vasilev (footballer, born 1984), footballer, playing for PFC Botev Plovdiv
- Vasil Vasilev (footballer, born 1976), footballer, playing for FC Malesh Mikrevo
- Vasil Vasilev, artist
