= Georgi Vasilev =

Georgi Vasilev may refer to:

- Georgi Vasilev (footballer, born 1945), Bulgarian footballer (forward) who competed at the 1968 Summer Olympics
- Georgi Vasilev (footballer, born 1946), Bulgarian football player (midfielder) and manager
