= Alexander Vasiliev (priest) =

Father Alexander Pavlovich Vasiliev (1894, Yekaterinoslav, Russian Empire – c. 1944) was a Russian Orthodox priest who later secretly entered into communion with the Russian Greek Catholic Church.

== Biography ==
Born in 1894 in Yekaterinoslav, Russian Empire (now Dnipro, Ukraine), Vasiliev graduated from high school in Mariupol and attended the Moscow Theological Academy. He was ordained a priest on 1 October 1927 by Bishop Bartholomew Remov, a notable Orthodox hierarch who would later secretly convert to Catholicism. Following his ordination, Vasiliev served as rector of the Church of Saint Nikita the Martyr in Krylatskoye, near Moscow.

On 25 December 1928, Vasiliev was secretly received into the Catholic Church by Bishop Pie Eugène Neveu, the clandestine Apostolic Administrator of Moscow. On 15 February 1931, he was arrested in Moscow as part of a wider case targeting the underground Greek-Catholic community. The charges against him included espionage and distributing counterrevolutionary literature. It was reportedly suggested that the charges would be dropped if he returned to Orthodoxy, an offer he refused.

On 18 August 1931, he was sentenced to 10 years in the Gulag. In 1934, he was transferred to a labor camp in the Chita region. The exact date and place of his death remains unknown, though he is believed to have died in the camps no later than 1944.
