= Aleksandr Vasilyev (footballer, born 1990) =

Russian footballer

Personal information
- Full name: Aleksandr Borisovich Vasilyev
- Date of birth: 1 March 1990 (age 36)
- Place of birth: Akuzovo, Russian SFSR
- Height: 1.74 m (5 ft 9 in)
- Positions: Midfielder; forward

Senior career*
| Years | Team | Apps | (Gls) |
| 2009–2010 | FC Mordovia Saransk | 25 | (1) |
| 2010 | → FC Gornyak Uchaly (loan) | 12 | (0) |
| 2012–2013 | FC Syzran-2003 | 31 | (1) |
| 2014 | FC KAMAZ Naberezhnye Chelny | 0 | (0) |
| 2015 | FC Ruzayevka-Avtomobilist | | |
| 2015 | FC Kafa Feodosia | | |
| 2016 | FC Volga Ulyanovsk | 9 | (0) |
| 2016 | FC KAMAZ Naberezhnye Chelny | 11 | (1) |
| 2017 | FC Saransk | | |
| 2018–2019 | FC Lada Dimitrovgrad (amateur) | | |
| 2019–2020 | FC Lada Dimitrovgrad | 24 | (1) |
- * Club domestic league appearances and goals

Aleksandr Borisovich Vasilyev (Russian: Александр Борисович Васильев; born 1 March 1990) is a Russian former professional football player.

== Club career ==
He made his Russian Football National League debut for FC Mordovia Saransk on 30 March 2010 in a game against FC Irtysh Omsk.
