= Dyulevo, Pazardzhik Province =

Village in Bulgaria

Coordinates: 42°27′00″N 24°23′00″E

Dyulevo (Bulgarian: Дюлево) is a village located near the town of Strelcha, western Bulgaria. The population is 248. There is an artificial pond in the vicinity where the road is raised.
