= Svoboda, Pazardzhik Province =

Village in Pazardzhik Province, Bulgaria

Svoboda Свобода
- Village
- Location within Bulgaria
- Coordinates: 42°23′00″N 24°20′00″E
- Country: Bulgaria
- Oblast: Pazardzhik
- Opština: Strelcha

Government
  - Mayor (Municipality): George Pavlov (Ind.)

Area
  - Total: 25.352 km^{2} (9.788 sq mi)
- Elevation: 441 m (1,447 ft)

Population (2024)
  - Total: 143
  - Density: 5.64/km^{2} (14.6/sq mi)
- Postal code: 4532
- Area code: 035393
- Vehicle registration: РА

Svoboda (Bulgarian: Свобода) is a village in the Pazardzhik Province, Bulgaria. As of 2005 it has 218 inhabitants. In Bulgarian its name means "freedom". A copper mine, Mina Radka is located at 5 km to the south.
