= Svetla Vassileva =

Svetla Vassileva may refer to:

- Svetla Vassileva (opera singer)
- Svetla Vassileva (publicist)
