= Alexei Vasiliev (historian) =

Russian Arabist and Africanist (born 1939)

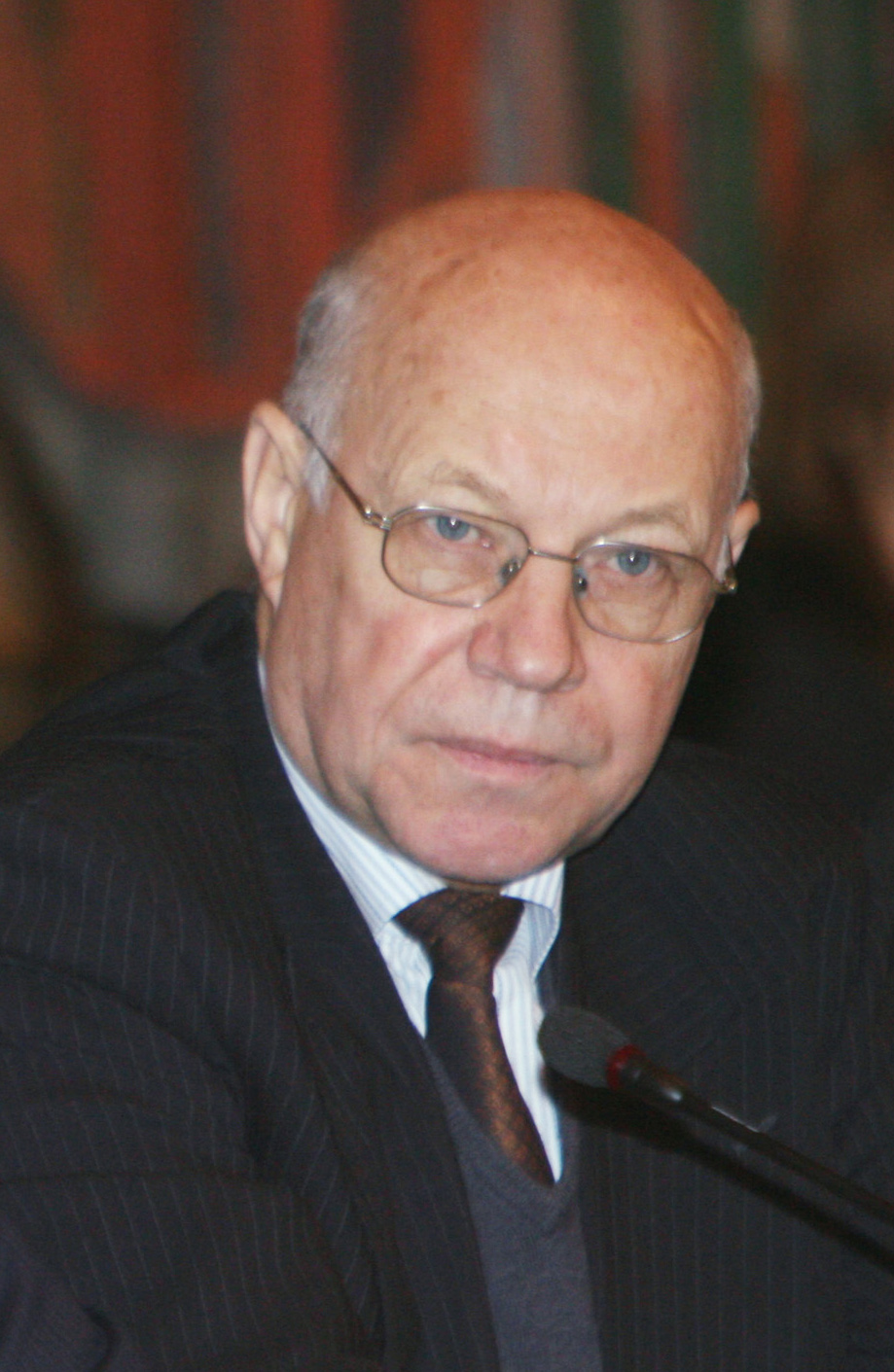
- Vasiliev in 2006
- Born: April 26, 1939 (age 87); Leningrad, Soviet Union
- Education: MGIMO
- Awards: (2025); Order of Honour; Order of Friendship
- Scientific career
- Fields: History of North Africa and West Asia, modern processes in African countries, Russia in the Middle East
- Workplaces: Institute for African Studies
- Website: www.inafran.ru/en/node/120

Alexei Mikhailovich Vasiliev (published also under the names Alexey Vasiliev and Alexei Vassiliev; Russian: Алексе́й Миха́йлович Васи́льев; born April 26, 1939, in Leningrad, Soviet Union) is a prominent Russian Arabist and Africanist. Dr. of Science (since 1981), Professor (since 1991), full member (academician) of the Russian Academy of Sciences (RAS) since 2011.

Honorary President of the Institute for African Studies of the RAS (since 2015). Director of the Institute for African Studies (1992–2015). Head of the chair for African and Arab Studies of Peoples' Friendship University of Russia (since 2013).

Special Representative of Russian President for Relations with African leaders (2006–2011). President of the Centre for Civilizational and Regional Studies of the RAS. Chairman of the RAS Scientific Council for the problems of economic, socio-political and cultural development of African countries. Member of the International Security Section of the Security Council of the Russian Federation. Member of the Academic-expert Council under the Speaker of the Council of Federation (Senate) of the Russian Federation. Member of the Foreign Policy Council of the Ministry of Foreign Affairs.

Editor-in-chief of Asia and Africa Today journal (since 1998). Member of the editorial council of Social Evolution & History journal. Member of the Russian Pugwash Committee under the Presidium of the RAS.

== Education ==
- In 1956 Vasiliev entered the Moscow State Institute of International Relations (MGIMO). He studied abroad at the University of Cairo (1960–1961).
- In 1962 Vasiliev graduated from the Department of Oriental Studies of the Faculty of International Relations, MGIMO.
- In 1966 Vasiliev defended his Ph.D. thesis "Wahhabism and the First Saudi State in Arabia (18th century)" at the Institute of Oriental Studies, Moscow.
- In 1981 Vasiliev defended his doctoral thesis "The Evolution of Socio-Political Structure of Saudi Arabia in 1745–1973" at the Institute of Oriental Studies, Moscow.

== Biography ==
Vasiliev was born on April 26, 1939, in Leningrad (St. Petersburg) in the family of a serviceman. In 1956 he entered the Moscow State Institute of International Relations (MGIMO). He interned at the University of Cairo (1960–1961). In 1962 he graduated from the Department of Oriental Studies of MGIMO and was assigned to the Pravda newspaper as an assistant political commentator. In 1967 Vasiliev was sent to Vietnam as Pravda's own war correspondent. At that time he also traveled to guerrilla-controlled zones in Laos. In 1969–1971 he worked for Pravda in Moscow, occasionally traveling abroad to report on events in "hot spots". From 1971 to 1975 A.M. Vasiliev worked as a Pravda correspondent in Ankara, Turkey. He was responsible for the region that included Turkey, Iran, Afghanistan, and the countries of the Arabian Peninsula. He also traveled to Syria to report on the Arab-Israeli war of 1973. In 1975–1979 he worked as Pravda's own correspondent in Egypt and was also responsible for Sudan, Libya, Yemen, and Ethiopia. From 1979 to 1983 he worked as a columnist on international relations at the central office of Pravda in Moscow. From his very first days in the Pravda newspaper Vasiliev combined journalism and literary work with academic research. In 1983 A.M. Vasiliev was appointed deputy director of the Institute for African Studies of the USSR Academy of Sciences. In 1992 he was elected Director of the institute. Subsequently, he was repeatedly re-elected. In 2015 he was elected Honorary President of the Institute for African Studies.

Vasiliev is married to Galina Sergeevna Vasilieva (Lyubushkina); has two daughters and three granddaughters.

== Research interests and major contributions ==
The scope of scientific interests of A.M. Vasiliev includes fundamental issues of social and political history of Arab countries in new and modern times, international relations in the Middle East, including relations with Russia, the role of religion in the political struggle, social changes in the countries of the Middle East, ethno-psychological factors in public life in the region, as well as the problem of Islamic extremism and terrorism.

Most significantly, Vasiliev was the first in Russia (then Soviet Union) to study the phenomenon of Wahhabism from the works of its founder, Muhammad ibn Abd al-Wahhab, and his predecessors. Many of the issues raised in his doctoral dissertation, which was devoted to 18th century Saudi Arabia, have remained relevant to the study of Islamic extremism in the 21st century. The most important monograph by Vasiliev is the fundamental History of Saudi Arabia. It is the first study to provide a comprehensive study of social, economic, political and religious evolution of Saudi Arabia over the period of nearly 250 years. The book uses the broadest range of currently available sources in Arabic, Turkish, English, French, Italian, German, and Russian languages. It is also based on materials from Russian and Soviet archives. Some of the conclusions of the book reach beyond the boundaries of Saudi Arabia. The book is available in Russian, English and Arabic.

Vasiliev continued the study of Saudi Arabia and published a number of bibliographic works related to the kingdom. One of them is the 2012 work – King Faisal of Saudi Arabia: Personality, Faith and Times – makes an in-depth focus on the role of a person in history of a country. It also touches on the topic of significance of religion and spiritual ideas for the policies of states.

Vasiliev developed a theory of Muslim reformation, which underlines the role of Wahhabism at the time of the crisis of the feudal system of the Ottoman Empire. He further studied the features of pre-capitalist Middle Eastern societies (with the greatest focus on Saudi Arabia, other Gulf countries, and Egypt) and the specifics of the development of market relations in oil-producing countries and Arab countries in general. A defining feature of this research is that the economic analysis is accompanied with an overview of the evolution of the socio-political system in these countries.

Of great importance to the development of Arab societies has been the ratio of private and public property. Over time the ratio was changing, reflecting political shifts, economic reforms or cultural trends. In this connection, Vasiliev in collaboration with Vladimir Kukushkin and Alexander Tkachenko carried out a comparative analysis of the privatization process in Russia, Central Asian and Arab countries. (See Privatization: a Comparative Analysis: Russia, Central Asia, Arab Countries. Moscow, 2002). The study uncovered a number of parallels in the privatization processes in the ex-USSR and the Arab world.

The monograph Russian policy in the Middle East: From Messianism to Pragmatism, which has also been translated into Arabic and English, contains an analysis of the Soviet/Russian policy in the region from 1917 to 1991 in terms of potential and achieved results of foreign policy and draws a comprehensive picture of the evolution of Russian relations with Middle Eastern countries over 74 years. The second volume of the work, The Limits of Pragmatism, is currently being finalized.

Vasiliev's research interests extend beyond the Middle East. For instance, he carried out an analysis of socio-economic problems of Africa, including Sub-Saharan Africa. In his analysis he assessed African societies as "multi-dimensional, patron-client, with patriarchal, traditional and modern elements". (See the monographs Africa: The Stepchild of Globalization and Africa and the Challenges of the 21st Century).

A number of works by Vasiliev discuss the oil factor in international relations. (See The Oil of the Gulf and the Arab Issue, The Torches of the Persian Gulf, etc.). The books Egypt and the Egyptians, The Bridge Across the Bosporus about Turkey and the Turks, The Persian Gulf in the Epicenter of the Storm, The Difficult Pass, The Roots of Tamarisk, A Journey to Arabia Felix, some of which are still in print in different languages due to their popularity, combine scientific analysis with journalistic presentation, making them more directed at a mass reader rather than the science community.

One of the first non-fiction books by Vasiliev is Rockets over the Lotus Flower. Vietnam During the War – a collection of journalist reports and a result of a two-year stay in Vietnam as a correspondent of the Pravda newspaper.

Since 2011, since the start of the events of the Arab Spring, much of Vasiliev's work has been devoted to the revolutionary wave in the Arab world and the analysis of religious extremism and terrorism. In this context, he co-authored the book Recipes of the Arab Spring.

For over 25 years Vasiliev directed the Institute for African Studies. Simultaneously, he oversaw the work of the Center for Civilisational and Regional Studies, supervised the preparation of the series History of African Countries and African Religions and of a number of reference books on Africa, served as the chief editor of the periodicals Works of the Institute for African Studies and Scholarly Notes of the Institute for African Studies.

Over the years, Vasiliev has published 40 books (counting editions and translations) and over 900 articles in Russian and foreign periodicals. He has been the chief editor of about 50 monographs, including the two-volume Encyclopedia of Africa. The monthly journal Asia and Africa Today, of which Vasiliev is the chief editor, is included in the list of journals recommended by the Higher Attestation Commission of the Russian Federation.

Vasiliev regularly advises the Presidential Administration, the Government of the Russian Federation, both chambers of the Federal Assembly, and the Russian Foreign Ministry. Already a director, he worked part-time at the Foreign Policy Planning Department of the Foreign Ministry.

Vasiliev was the Special Representative of the President of the Russian Federation for Relations with African Leaders in the framework of G8 summits. As a consultant or a member of the delegation he took part in the 1989 Bush-Gorbachev summit on Malta, the visit of Russian Prime Minister V. Chernomyrdin to Saudi Arabia, Kuwait, UAE, and Oman in 1994, the visit of the President of the Russian Federation D.A. Medvedev to Egypt, Nigeria, Namibia, and Angola in 2009.

Vasiliev often gives lectures at universities in Russia, the United States, the UK, Italy, France, Switzerland, Egypt, Saudi Arabia, Qatar, Kuwait, Oman. He was a scientific adviser of 12 scholars, some of them from Arab and African countries, who earned their Ph.D.s at the Institute for African Studies.

== Awards ==
- Order of Friendship - "for his great contribution to the development and strengthening of relations between Russia and African states" (Presidential Decree of March 20, 2011 No. 328 "On awarding the Order of Friendship to Vasiliev A.M.).
- Order of Honour.
- Laureate of the Tarle Prize of the Russian Academy of Sciences (2003).
- Honored Science Worker of the Russian Federation (1999).
- Laureate of the State Prize of the Russian Federation
- Various Russian state medals.

== Publications ==
- From Lenin to Putin. Russia in the Near and Middle East. – Moscow, 2018. ISBN 978-5-227-07511-6 (in Russian)
- Russian Middle East Policy. From Lenin to Putin. – London, 2018. ISBN 978-1-138-56360-5 (hbk); ISBN 978-1-315-12182-6 (ebk)
- Islamic Radical Movements on the Political Map of the Modern World. Volume 3. Afroasiatic Zone of Instability. (co-authored). – Moscow, 2018. ISBN 978-5-91298-219-4 (in Russian)
- Islamic Radical Movements on the Political Map of the Modern World. Volume 2. North and South Caucasus. (co-authored). – Moscow, 2017. ISBN 978-5-7164-0719-0 (in Russian)
- Africa and the Challenges of the 21st Century. – Moscow, 2012. ISBN 978-5-02-036501-8 (in Russian)
- The Recipes of the Arab Spring. – Moscow, 2012. ISBN 978-5-4438-0148-3 (in Russian)
- King Faisal of Saudi Arabia. Personality, Faith and Times. – London, 2012. ISBN 978-0-86356-689-9 (in English)
- King Faisal of Saudi Arabia. Personality, Faith and Times. – Beirut, 2012. ISBN 978-1-85516-862-6 (in Arabic)
- King Faisal of Saudi Arabia. Personality, Faith and Times. – Moscow, 2010. ISBN 978-5-02-036408-0 (in Russian)
- Egypt and the Egyptians. – 3rd edition. – Moscow, 2008. (in Russian)
- The Middle East Conflict: the Status and Proposed Solutions (co-authored with Tkachenko A.A., et al.). – Moscow, 2007. (in Russian)
- Africa: The Stepchild of Globalization. – Moscow, 2003. (in Russian)
- Privatization: A Comparative Analysis: Russia, Central Asia, Arab countries (co-authored with Kukushkin V.U., Tkachenko A.A.) – Moscow, 2002. (in Russian)
- The Iraqi Aggression Against Kuwait. In the Mirror of the Russian Press (August 1990 – April 1991). – Moscow, 2000. (in Russian)
- The Annotated Bibliography of Saudi Arabia (Publications in Russian). – Moscow, 2000. (in Russian)
- The History of Saudi Arabia (1745 to the End of the 20th Century). – Moscow, 1999. (in Russian)
- The History of Saudi Arabia. – London, 1998. (in English)
- Russian Policy in the Middle East: From Messianism to Pragmatism. – Cairo, 1996. (in Arabic)
- The History of Saudi Arabia from the Middle of the 18th Century to the End of the 20th Century. – Beirut, 1995. (in Arabic)
- Egypt and the Egyptians. – 2nd edition. – Beirut, 1994. (in Arabic)
- The History of Saudi Arabia from the Middle of the 18th Century until the End of the 20th Century. – Moscow, 1994. (in Russian)
- Russian Policy in the Middle East: From Messianism to Pragmatism. – Reading, 1993. (in English)
- Russian Policy in the Middle East: From Messianism to Pragmatism. – Moscow, 1993. (in Russian)
- Egypt and the Egyptians. – Tallinn, 1992. (in Estonian)
- Egypt and the Egyptians. – Riga, 1990. (in Latvian)
- The Bridge Across the Bosporus. – 2nd edition. – Moscow, 1989. (in Russian)
- Egypt and the Egyptians. – Moscow, 1989. (in Arabic)
- The Roots of Tamarisk. – Moscow, 1987. (in Russian)
- Egypt and the Egyptians. – Moscow, 1986. (in Russian)
- The History of Saudi Arabia. – Revised edition. – Moscow, 1986. (in Arabic)
- The Persian Gulf in the Epicenter of the Storm. – Yerevan, 1986. (in Armenian)
- The Persian Gulf in the Pentagon's Direct Firing Line. – Moscow, 1986. (in Arabic)
- The Persian Gulf in the Epicenter of the Storm. – Moscow, 1983. (in Russian)
- The Bibliography of Saudi Arabia. – Moscow, 1983. (in Russian)
- The History of Saudi Arabia (1745–1973). – Moscow, 1982. (in Russian)
- The Oil of the Gulf and the Arab Issue. – Cairo, 1979. (in Arabic)
- The Bridge Across the Bosporus. – Moscow, 1979. (in Russian)
- The Difficult Pass. – Moscow, 1977. (in Russian)
- The Torches of the Persian Gulf. – Moscow, 1976. (in Russian)
- The Torches of the Persian Gulf. – Tehran, 1358. (in Persian)
- A Journey to Arabia Felix. – Moscow, 1974. (in Russian)
- Rockets over the Lotus Flower. Vietnam During the War. – Moscow, 1970. (in Russian)
- The Puritans of Islam? Wahhabism and the First State in Saudi Arabia (1744/45–1818). – Moscow, 1967. (in Russian)
- Monopolies and Peoples. – Sofia, 1965. (in Bulgarian)
- Oil: Monopolies and Peoples. – Moscow, 1964. (in Russian)
