= Ivaylo Vasilev =

Ivaylo Vasilev may refer to:

- Ivaylo Vasilev (footballer born 1991), Bulgarian football goalkeeper for Levski Sofia
- Ivaylo Vasilev (footballer born 1987), Bulgarian football defender for Akademik Sofia
