= Pskov State Polytechnic Institute =

Former university of Pskov region

The Pskov State Polytechnic Institute (PPI)
- Псковский государственный политехнический институт
- Motto: Education - the path to success!
- Type: Public
- Active: 1960–2010
- Rector: Sergey Mikhailovich Verteshev - Dr.Sc. (doctor of technical science), professor.
- Faculty: 7
- Students: About 7000
- Location: Pskov, Pskov Oblast, Russia; 57°48′52.78″N 28°21′10.59″E
- Campus: Urban
- Website: www.ppi.gtspskov.ru

The Pskov State Polytechnic Institute (Russian: Псковский государственный политехнический институт was a major educational institution in the Pskov Region. About 7000 full-time and part-time students study at PPI. In 2010 it was merged with the Pskov State Pedagogical Institute to form the Pskov State University.

== History ==
The institute was founded in 1960 as an educational and consulting center of the North-west Polytechnic Institute. In 1972 PPI became a branch of the Leningrad Polytechnic Institute (LPI). It became an independent educational institution in 2004 by the Order of the Government of Russia on the basis of the branch of Saint-Petersburg State Polytechnic University.

== Today ==
The institute trains specialists in Economics, Finance, Management, Public Administration, Construction, Mechanical Engineering, Computer Science, Electrical Engineering, and Automatic Production. PPI has highly skilled teaching staff.

== International cooperation ==
Pskov State Polytechnic Institute cooperates with 10 institutions of higher education in Germany, the Netherlands, Finland, the United States, Poland, Lithuania and Latvia.

The partners of the Institute are: Savonia University of Applied Sciences, Kuopio (FIN); Turku University of Applied Sciences, Turku (FIN); the Hague School of European Studies at the Hague University of Professional Education, the Hague (NL); the University of Massachusetts Amherst, Amherst, Massachusetts (USA); Aahen Higher Professional School, Aahen (GER); Jagiellonian University, Kraków (POL); Kaunas College, Kaunas (LT); Rezekne Higher Education Institution, Rezekne (LV); Malnava College, Malnava (LV); and Eschweiler Professional College, Eschweiler (GER).

PPI cooperates with partner institutions within the Baltic Sea Sustainable Development Network (BSSDN) and the International Academy of Sciences of Higher School. In addition, the institute is planning to join the Baltic Sea Region University Network (BSRUN).

International cooperation is carried out in the following areas: economics and finance, tourism, public administration, management, industrial and civil engineering, motor vehicles and motor transportation, environmental engineering, information technologies, mechanical engineering, power supply and electromechanics.

International educational programmes

PPI develops international educational programmes. Annually, about 50 teachers, staff members and students travel abroad to teach classes, participate in international conferences and seminars, carry out joint research projects and study.

Students have the opportunity to participate in exchange programmes with institutions of higher education in Finland, the Netherlands, Germany, Czech Republic and the USA.

In addition, approximately 50 international students and guest teachers come to Pskov State Polytechnic Institute every year.

The Institute pays special attention to the development of educational programmes. The following areas of cooperation can be mentioned:

Education of international students at PPI:

Full program (in Russian);

Individualtraining (1 semester / 1-year program in English);

Education in international groups (in English);

Short-term educational programmes in English (вЂњSummer / Winter school, вЂќ etc.).

Individual training of international students at PPI:

Internships at Pskov and Pskov Region enterprises;

Research activities;

Annual and graduation projects.

== Structure ==
There are all the necessary facilities at PPI.

== Faculties ==
There are 7 faculties in PPI:
1. Computer Science faculty offers specialist degrees

- in Computers, Complexes, Systems and Networks;
- Information Systems and Technologies.

2. Mechanical Engineering Faculty offers specialist degrees in

- Technology of Machine- building;
- Motor Vehicles and Motor Transportation;
- Environmental Engineering.

3. Constructional Engineering Faculty offers specialist degrees in

- Industrial and Civil Engineering;
- Road Construction and Aerodromes;
- Expertise and Real Estate Management.

4. Electro-mechanical Faculty offers specialist degrees in

- Power Supply;
- Electrical Drive and Automation of Industrial-scale plantsand Technological Complexes.

5. Finance and Economics Faculty offers specialist degrees in

- Finance and Credit;
- Accounting, Analysis and Audit.

6. Management and Public Administration Faculty offers specialist degrees in

- Public Administration;
- Management of an Organization;
- Production Management;
- Innovation Management.

7. Preparatory Faculty offers

- courses for PPI's entrants in Mathematics, Physics, Computer Science, the Russian language;
- programmes at Physics and Mathematics School;
- programmes at Foreign Languages Department.

== Postgraduate study ==
There are post-graduate studies at PPI under the following direction:

- Technology of Machine- building;
- Electro Mechanics and Electric Apparatus;
- Computer Networks and Information Systems and Technologies;
- National economy management.

PPI develops international cooperation with institutions of higher education in the Baltic States, West Europe and the USA. Annually the best students and teachers of PPI take part in different exchange programs with the Netherlands, the US, Germany and the Baltic States.
