= Strelcha =

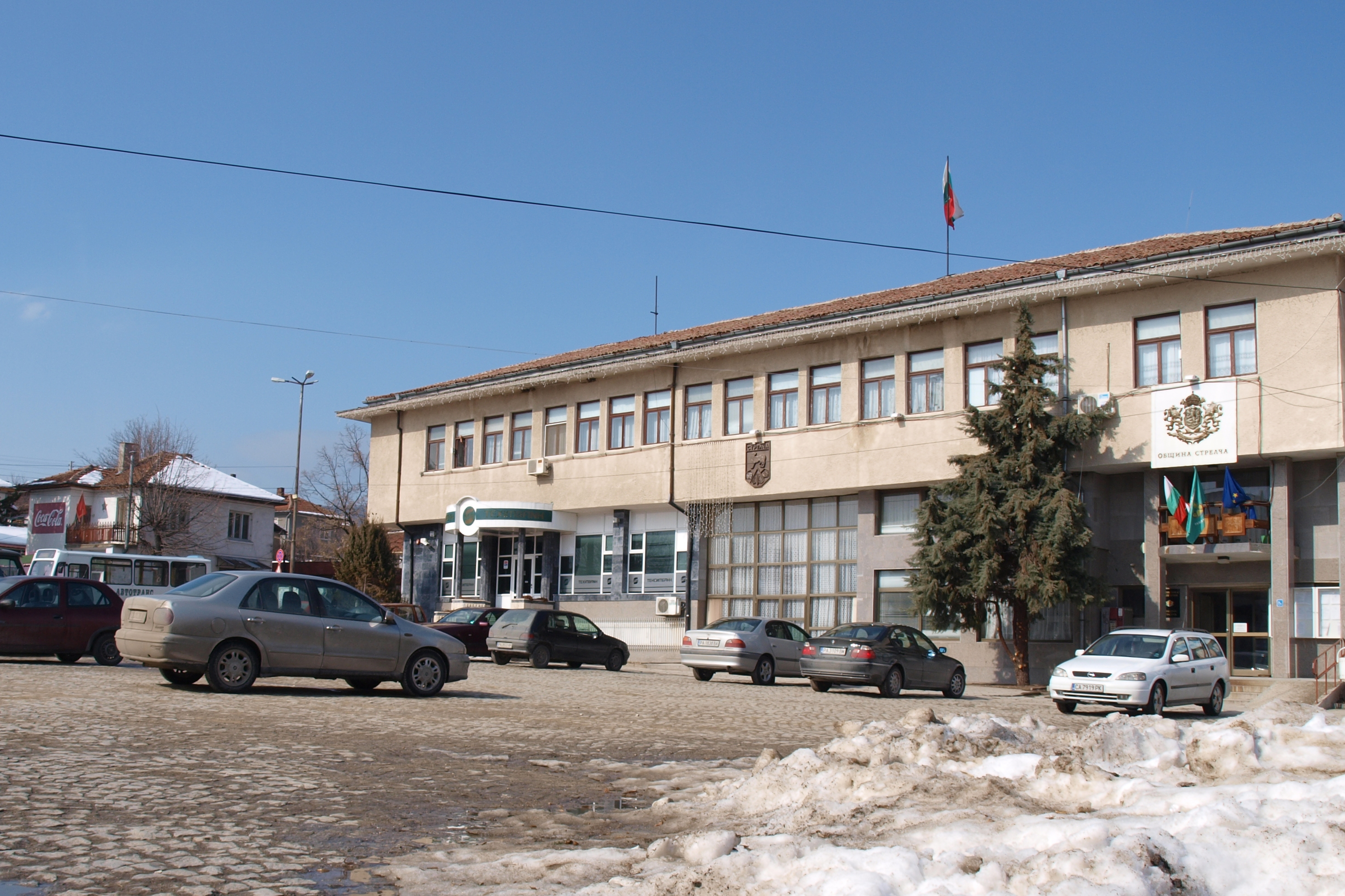
- Strelcha Municipality

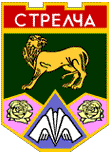
- Coat of arms

- Location of Strelcha
- Coordinates: 42°30′N 24°19′E
- Country: Bulgaria
- Province (Oblast): Pazardzhik

Government
  - Mayor: Georgi Pavlov
- Elevation: 483 m (1,585 ft)

Population (2013-09-15)
  - Total: 4,284
- Time zone: UTC+2 (EET)
  - Summer (DST): UTC+3 (EEST)
- Postal Code: 4530
- Area code: 03532

Strelcha (Bulgarian: Стрелча [ˈstrɛɫt͡ʃɐ]) is a small Bulgarian town with a population of 4,284 as of September 2013. The town lies 13 km to the east of Panagyurishte and 41 km to the north of Pazardzhik. It is a capital of homonymous municipality, part of Pazardzhik Province. It is situated in a valley in the southern skirts of the Sredna Gora mountain.

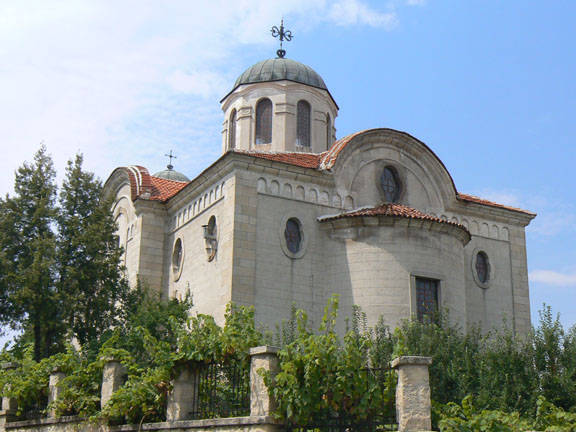
Church of St Archangel Michael in Strelcha.

The favourable microclimate, nature and mineral water springs, combined with the rich history and natural sights, have turned Strelcha into a national spa resort all around the year. Even if the town's tourism industry has decayed somewhat in the early post-communist period, its tourist product has started to revive in the last couple of years.

Arguably, the most important sight in the town is the Bulgarian Orthodox Archangel Michael Church Monument dedicated to the citizens of Strelcha that were killed during the April Uprising of 1876, Balkan Wars and WW1. Their names can be seen inscribed on both sides of the church.

The rose gardens in Strelcha spread over 3,000 decares, as this is one of the biggest rose oil production regions in Bulgaria. The highest quality of rose oil is produced in the municipality. Besides roses, since the 1990s and 2000s Strelcha successfully cultivated lavender, from which first-class essential oil is extracted.

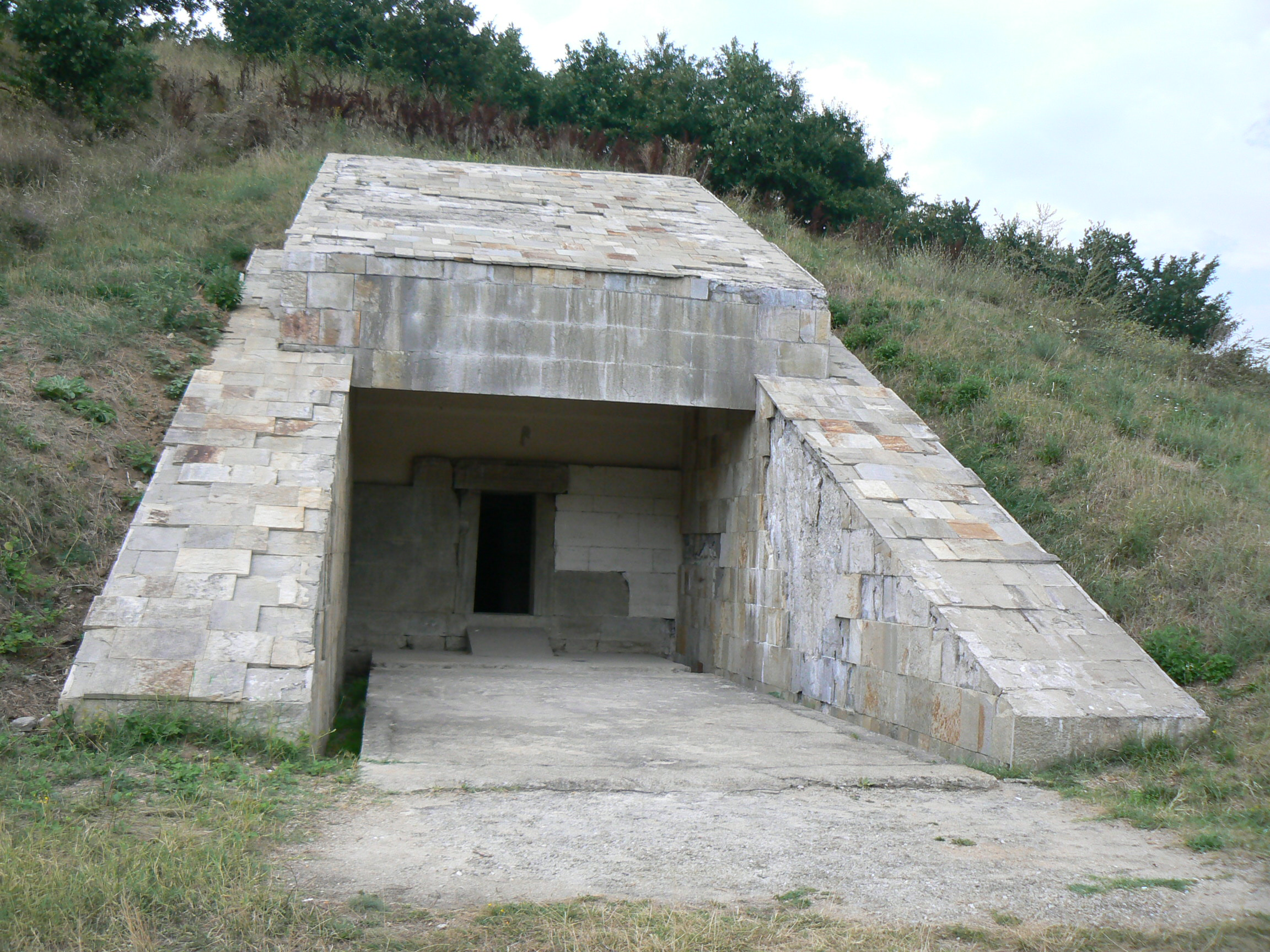
A Thracian tomb near Strelcha.

Outside Strelcha, the road to the town of Koprivshtitsa (24 km) has views of natural rock formations. Three kilometres to the southeast of Strelcha one can see the Zhaba Mogila ("Frog Mound") inside which archeologists have found a Thracian temple. The mound is one of the biggest in Bulgaria — its height is more than 20 m, while its diameter is about 80–90 m. The two chambers and the façade are built of large, masterly carved stone blocks, connected with iron conjunctures and covered with lead. The biggest of these blocks measures 2.6 m by 0.6 m. Their arrangement is regarded as flawless. A tunnel with a length of 75 m has been dug below the mound and is planned to be transformed into a museum. A second stone construction, believed to have served as a sanctuary, has been found in the northwest part of the mound. It consists of three halls with a total area of 25 square metres.

2.5 km to the south of Strelcha one can see the remains of the Strelcha Fortress (Kaleto) believed to date back to the 9–10th century A.D. The fortress was built on the right bank of the Luda Yana River on a separate hill; the fortress walls surrounded by a rectangular space with a length of 140 m and a width of 50–60 m. Additionally, there are some preserved remains of several other fortresses to the south and southeast of Strelcha.

== Honours ==
Strelcha Spur on Graham Land, Antarctica is named after the town.
