= Blatnitsa =

Village in Bulgaria

Coordinates: 42°22′00″N 24°25′00″E

Blatnitsa, also known as Blatnica and Blatnitza, (Bulgarian: Блатница) is a small village in the Strelcha municipality, western Bulgaria. As of 31 December 2023 it has 162 inhabitants.
