= Homicidal ideation =

Common medical term for thoughts about homicide

- Specialty: Psychiatry, clinical psychology, emergency medicine

Homicidal ideation is a common medical term for thoughts about homicide. There is a range of homicidal thoughts which spans from vague and fleeting to detailed and fully formulated plans without the act itself. Most people who have homicidal ideation do not commit homicide. 50–91% of people surveyed on university grounds in various places in the United States admit to having had a homicidal fantasy. Homicidal ideation accounts for 2–5% of patient presentations to psychiatric facilities in the United States.

Homicidal ideation is not a disease itself, but may result from other illnesses such as delirium and psychosis. Psychosis, which accounts for 89% of admissions with homicidal ideation in one US study, includes substance-induced psychosis (e.g. amphetamine psychosis) and the psychoses related to schizophreniform disorder and schizophrenia. Delirium is often drug induced or secondary to general medical illness(es). Homicidal ideation is also a possible side effect of many psychiatric medications.

It may arise in association with personality disorders or it may occur in people who do not have any detectable illness. In fact, surveys have shown that the majority of people have had homicidal fantasies at some stage in their life. Many theories have been proposed to explain this.

== Diagnosis ==
=== Violence risk ===
There are many associated risk factors which include a history of violence, thoughts of committing harm, poor impulse control and an inability to delay gratification.

=== Associated psychopathology ===
People who have homicidal ideation are at higher risk of other psychopathology than the normal population. This includes suicidal ideation, psychosis, delirium, or intoxication.

Homicidal ideation may arise in relation to behavioural conditions such as personality disorder (particularly conduct disorder, narcissistic personality disorder and antisocial personality disorder). A study in Finland showed an increased risk of violence from people who have antisocial personality disorder, which is greater than the risk of violence from people who have schizophrenia. The same study also cites that many other mental disorders are not associated with an increased risk of violence, of note: depression, anxiety disorders and intellectual disability.

Homicidal ideation may arise in people who are otherwise quite well, as is demonstrated by the fact that the greater majority of people within the general population have had homicidal fantasies. When triggering factors are sought regarding homicidal fantasies the majority seem to be linked in some way to the disruption of a couple relationship. Either jealousy or revenge, greed/lust or even fear and self-defense prompt homicidal thoughts and actions in the majority of cases. In a minority of cases, homicides and acts of violence may be related to mental disorder. These homicides and fantasies do not seem to have the same underlying triggers as those by people without a mental disorder, but when these trigger factors are present the risk for violence is greater than usual.

People who present with homicidal ideation also have a higher risk of suicide. This shows the need for an assessment of suicide risk in people with thoughts of violence towards others.

=== Spurious and fictitious homicidal ideation ===
Sometimes people claiming to have homicidal ideation do not actually have homicidal thoughts but merely claim to have them. They may do this for a variety of reasons, e.g. to gain attention, to coerce a person or people for or against some action, or to avoid social or legal obligation (sometimes by gaining admission to a hospital) — see malingering or factitious disorder.

== Theories ==
A number of theories have been proposed to explain the phenomenon of homicidal ideation or homicide itself. Many of these theories seem to overlap. They often are not mutually exclusive. At present no single theory explains all the phenomena noted in homicide, although many theories go some way to explaining several areas. Most of these theories follow the reasoning of theories studied in criminology. A brief synopsis of theories specific to homicide follows.

=== Homicide adaptation ===
This is the most recent of evolutionary theories. It claims to explain most of the phenomena associated with homicide. It states that humans have evolved with adaptations that enable us to think of and/or plan homicide. We come up with the idea as a possible answer to our problem position (threat to ourselves, our mates or our resources) and include a range of thought processes regarding killer and victim (degree of relatedness, relative status, gender, reproductive values, size and strength of families, allies and resources) and the potential costs of making use of such a high penalty strategy as homicide. If homicide is determined to be the best solution strategy, then it might be functional.

=== By-product hypothesis ("slip up") ===
According to this hypothesis, homicide is considered to be a mistake or over-reaction. Normal psychological mechanisms for control of property, partner or personal safety may not appear to be sufficient under certain stressful circumstances and abnormal mechanisms develop. Particularly extreme expressions of this may occur leading to homicide where in the normal state the perpetrator would not behave in this manner.

== Management ==
Not much information is available regarding the management of patients with homicidal thoughts. In Western countries, the management of such people lies within the realms of the police force and the health system. It is generally agreed upon that people with homicidal thoughts who are thought to be at high risk of acting them out should be recognized as needing help. They should be brought swiftly to a place where an assessment can be made and any underlying medical or mental disorder should be treated.
