= Melnik =

Melnik may refer to:

== Places ==
- Melnik, Bulgaria, a town
  - Villa Melnik Winery near Melnik, Bulgaria
  - Melnik Earth Pyramids near Melnik, Bulgaria
- Mělník, a town in the Czech Republic
  - Mělník District in the Czech Republic
- Melnik, Wisconsin, an unincorporated community in the United States
- Melnik Ridge in Antarctica
- Melnik Peak in Antarctica

== People ==
- See Andriy Melnyk

== Other ==
- Melnik (grape)
- Melnick 34, a massive luminous Wolf–Rayet star
- Melnick 42, a massive blue supergiant star
- Melnick–Needles syndrome that affects bone development
