= Kordopulov House =

Coordinates: 41°31′23″N 23°23′54″E

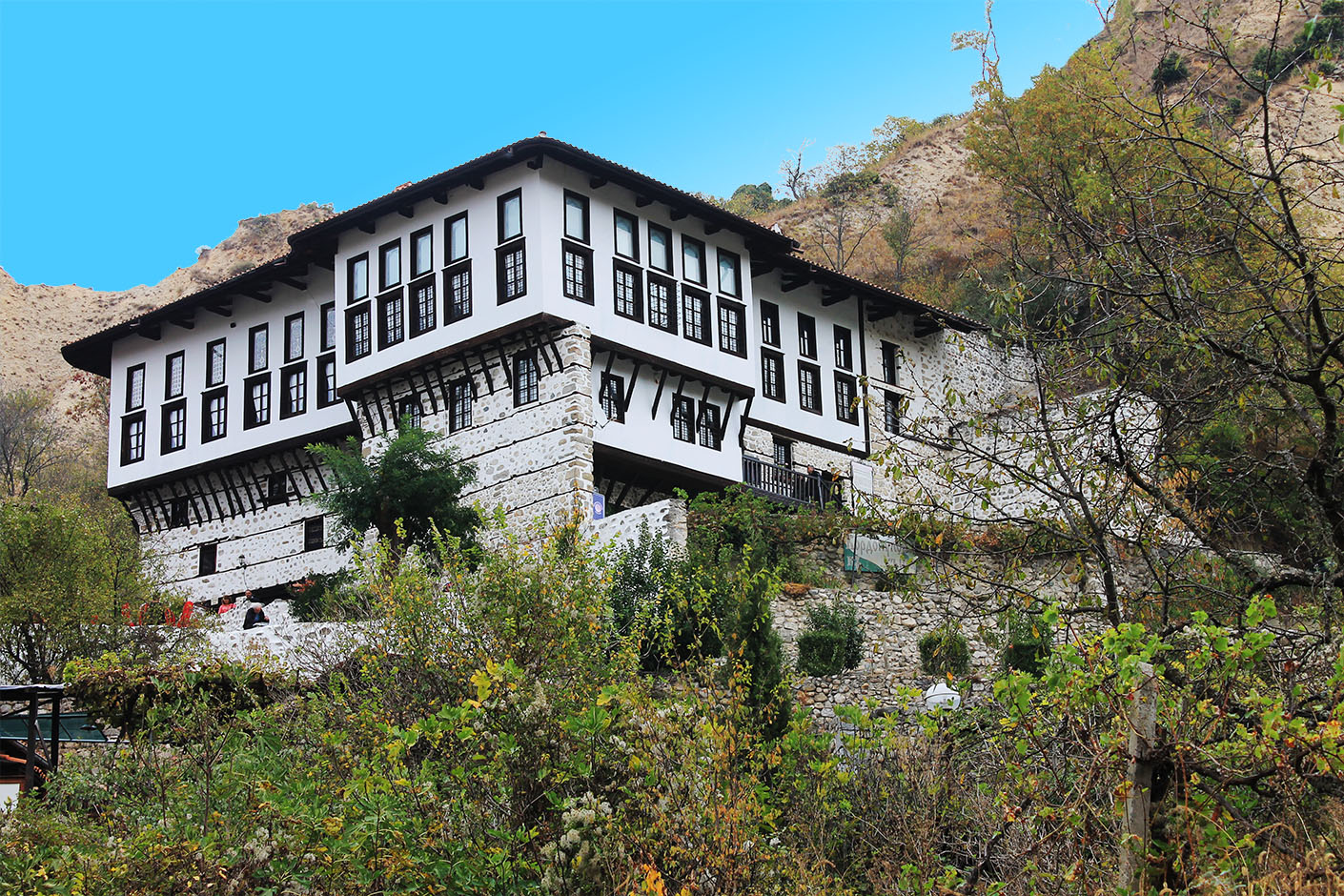
The Kordopulov House.

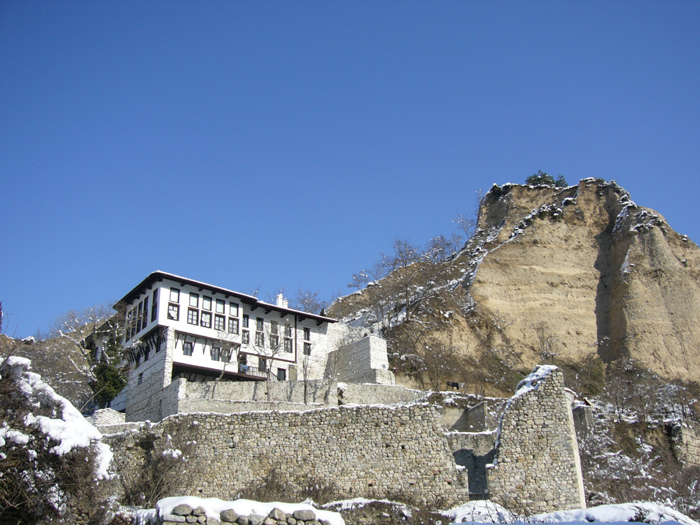
The Kordopulov House in winter.

The Kordopulov (or Kordopulov's) House (Bulgarian: Кордопулова къща, Kordopulova kashta) is a large late Ottoman style house in the southwestern Bulgarian town of Melnik. It was built in 1754 specifically for wine production and was bought by the Greek merchant Manolis Kordopoulos. The house, possibly the largest of its kind and period, is located in the town's eastern part and consists of a ground floor that includes a wine cellar, a semi-basement for economic needs and a bay floor intended to be inhabited.

== Overview ==
The Koropulov House was built in 1754. It belonged to Manolis Kordopulos, an affluent wine merchant who traded throughout Europe, particularly Paris and Venice. Today, it is one of the 100 national tourist sites in Bulgaria, serving as a museum with a special area for wine-tasting.

The mansion is located in Melnik, the smallest town in Bulgaria. The town boasts a long history of wine. Its endemic variety Shiroka Melnishka Losa, reportedly produced since antiquity, utilizes grapes with large and rough leaves and small, dark-colored berries, which are harvested in early October and ripened in oak barrels. Wines here are complex and spicy.

Bulgarian revolutionary Yane Sandanski would use the house for shelter before World War I. The last of the Kordopulov family was killed in 1916 and the house passed to Agnesa, either a maid or a sister of a Kordopulov. She married Georgi Tsinstarov and, although they had no children, they adopted their nephew Gavrail. He is in turn the father of Nikola Paspalev, the current owner. The Kordopulov House was renovated in 1974-1980 and is currently a private museum that is visited by 30,000 tourists a year.

== Layout ==
The largest Revival house in Bulgaria and the Balkans, it consists of three levels and a basement. Outside the home lies the ruins of a family chapel dedicated to St. Barbara. The living room is about 90 square meters and is characterized by two rows of six windows. The upper row is a mixture of Venetian and Oriental style, whereas the lower row is typical of the Bulgarian Revival period. The ceiling depicts the sun as well as twelve geometric figures symbolizing the twelve apostles and the twelve months of the year. A middle room was reserved for hosting small gatherings Vienna Philharmonic Orchestra. One bedroom features stained glass windows and a ceiling with Bulgarian, Greek, Turkish, and oriental motifs. The fireplace in this room is in the form of a minaret with an Orthodox cross. The dining room includes a special cupboard used during deals between two people, where a third person may sit unseen; the cupboard also has access to the living room. The mansion also includes a glass-enclosed winter garden and a summer terrace with a stone sundial.

The characteristic Melnik wine cellar is dug into the rock to form a tunnel. The cellar can take 300 tons of wine, with the largest cask being able to take 12.5 tons alone. The corridors are relatively narrow and low at places and the cellar disposes of a ventilation system and special canals.

Two of the Kordopulov House's four floors are made of stone. Seven inner staircases connect the floors and garrets and the two wooden floors are covered with motley rugs.

== Gallery ==
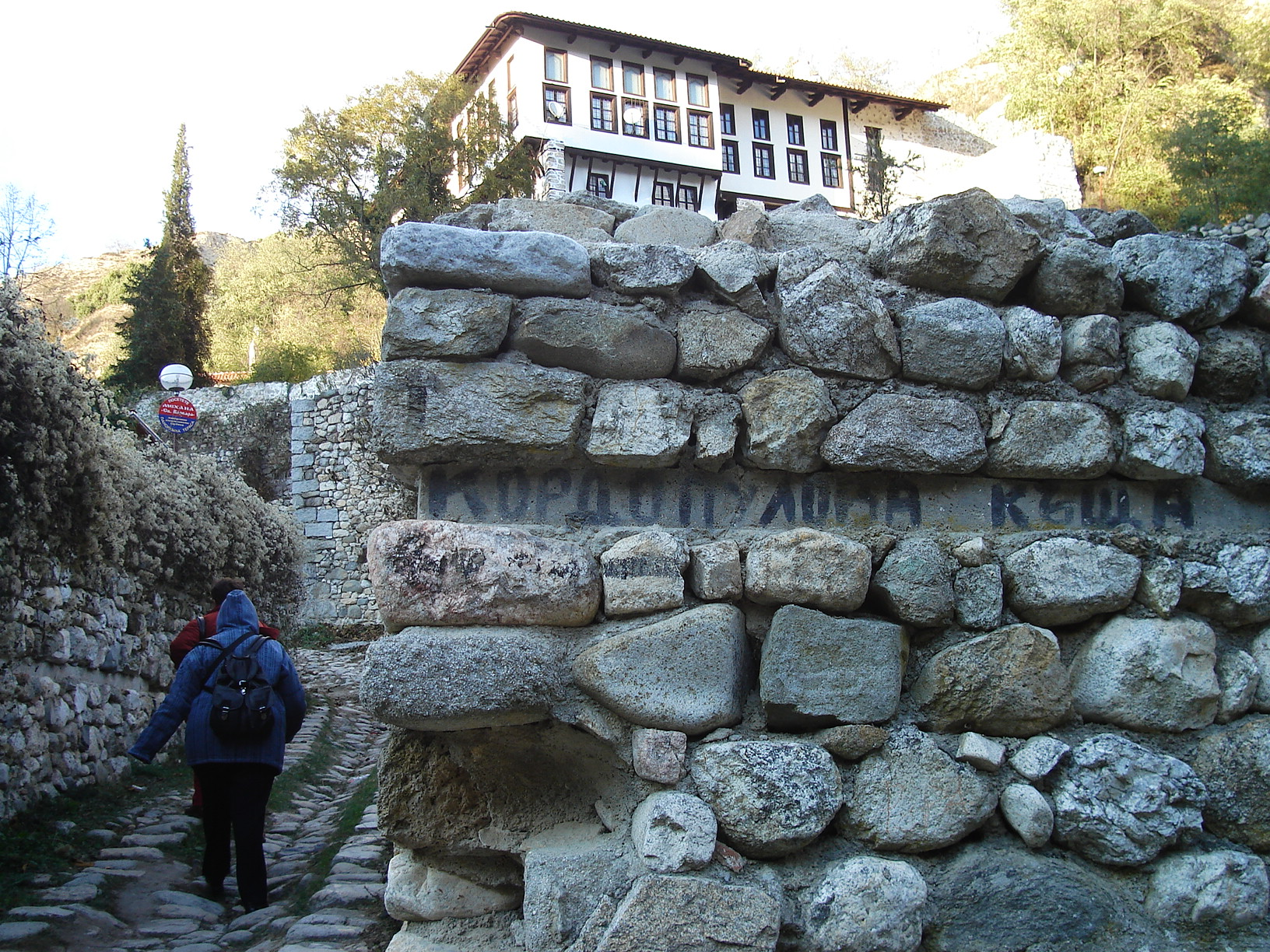

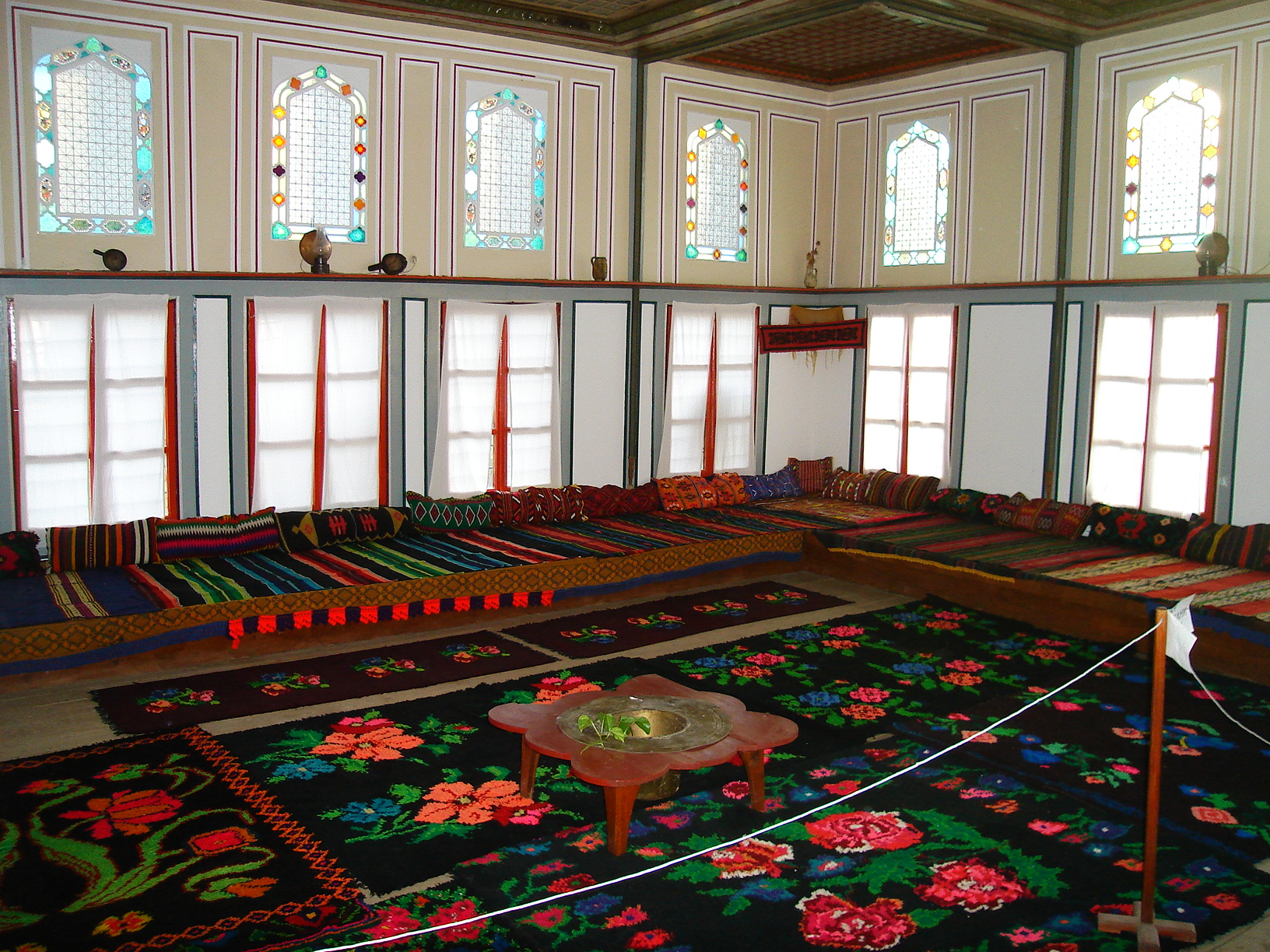

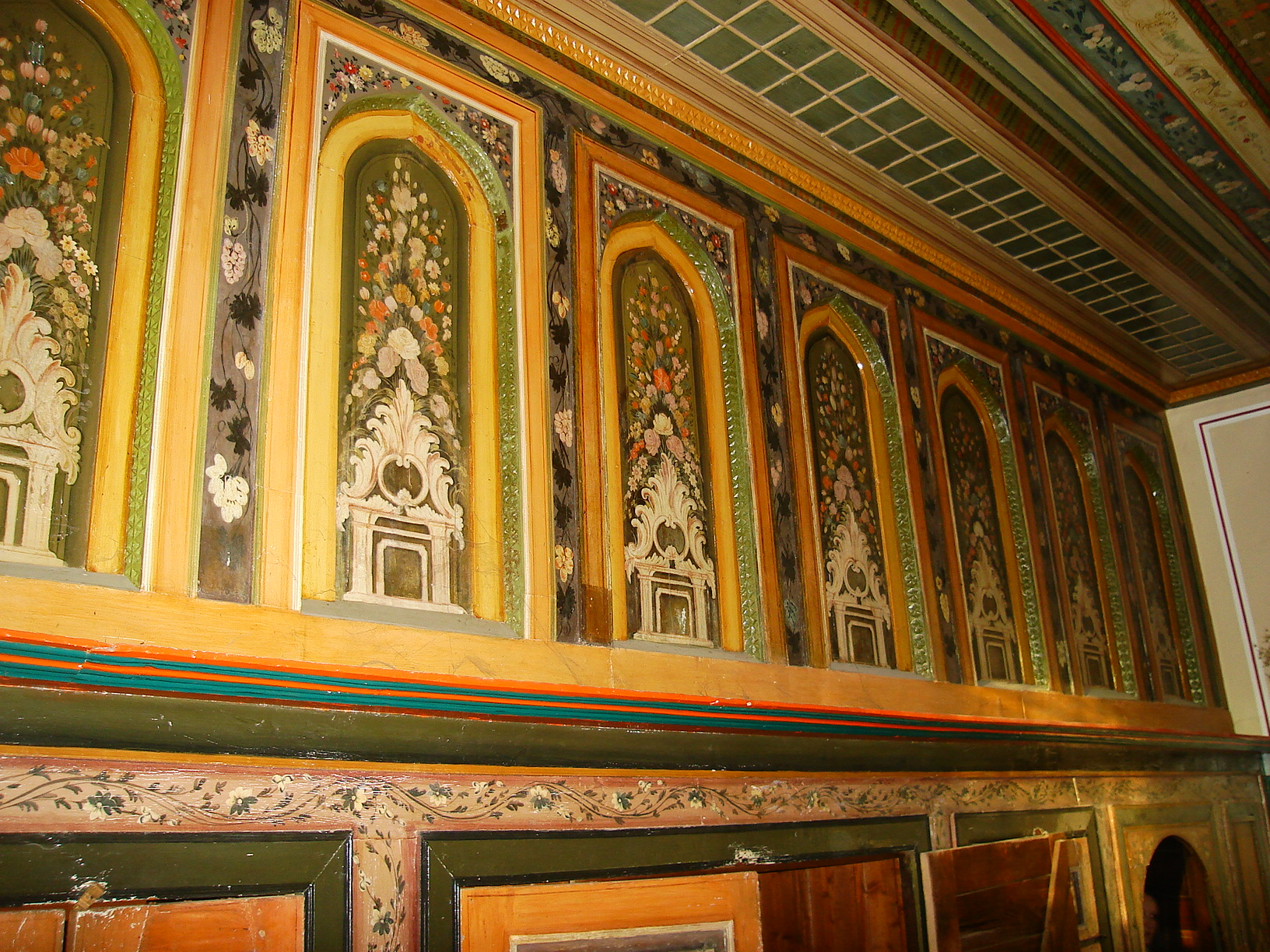

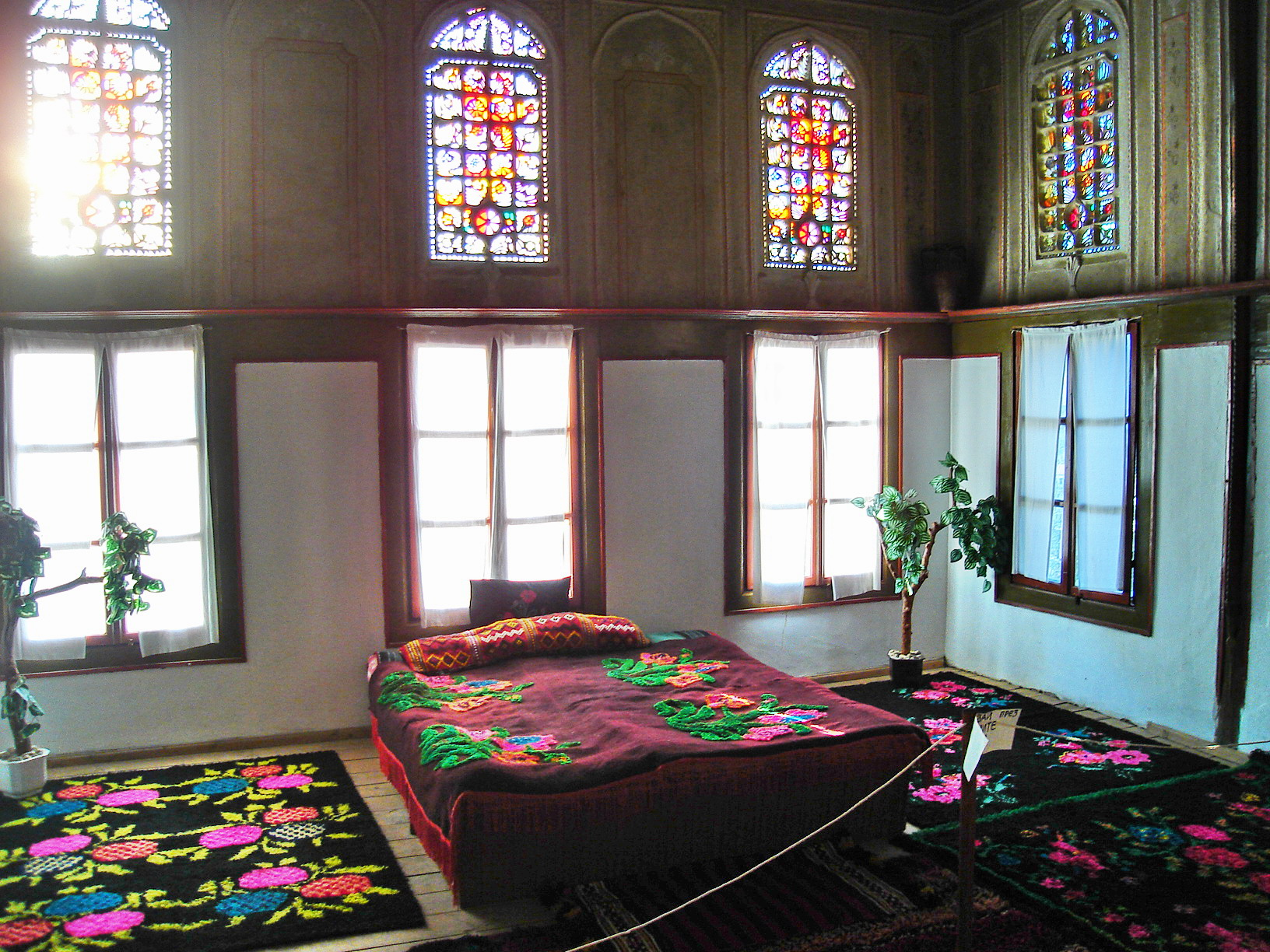

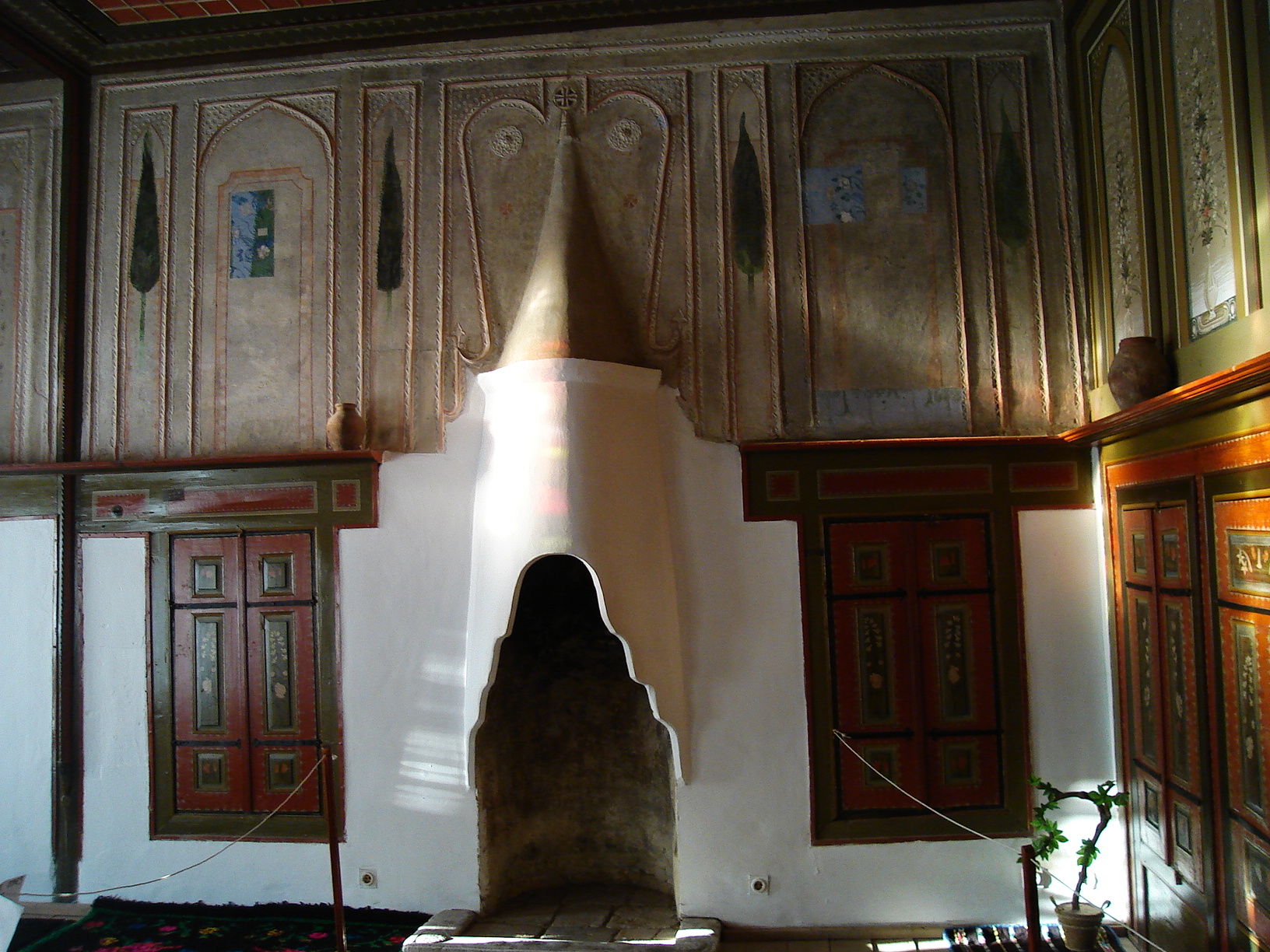

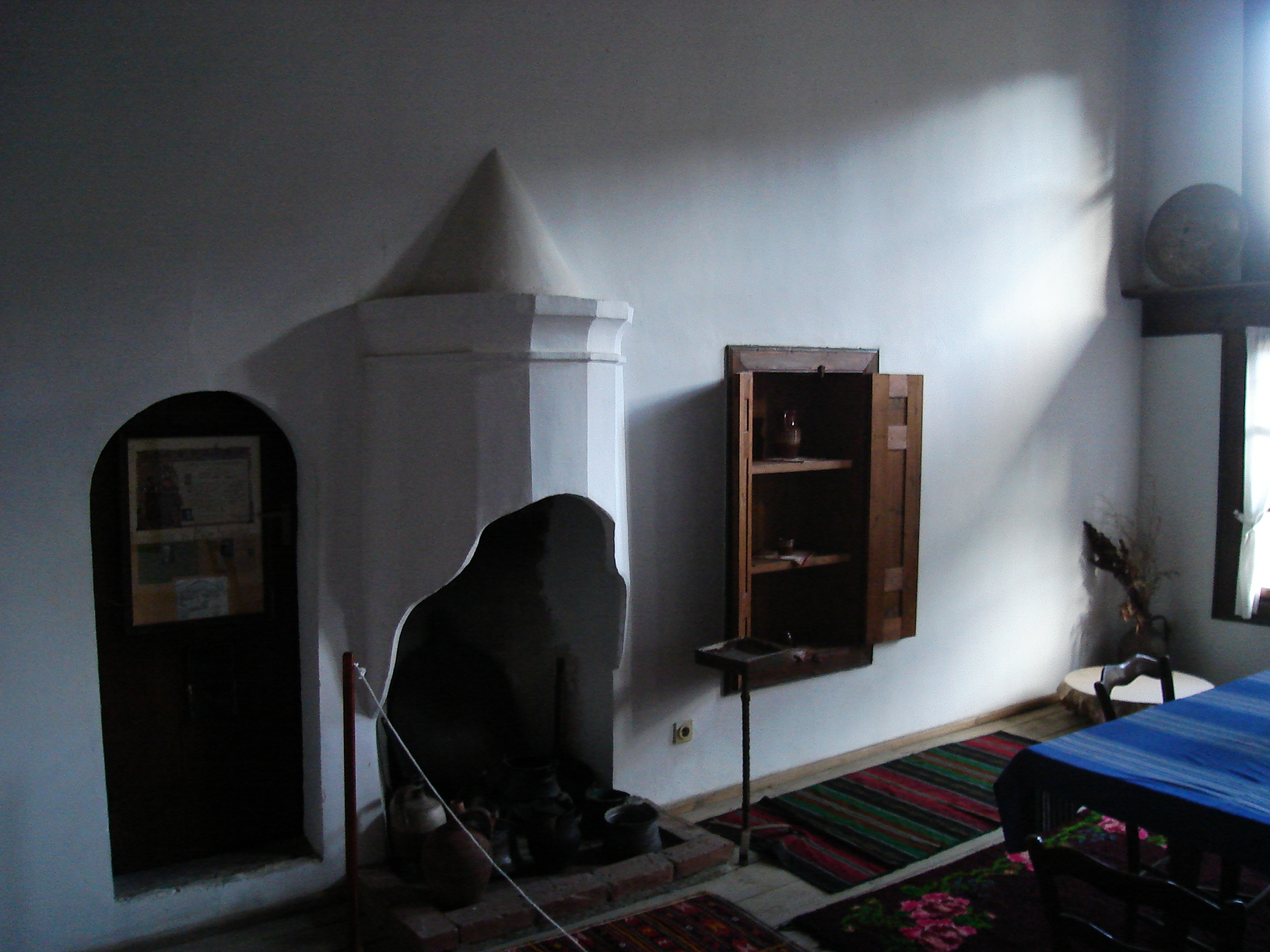
