= Villa Melnik Winery =

Winery in Bulgaria

Villa Melnik
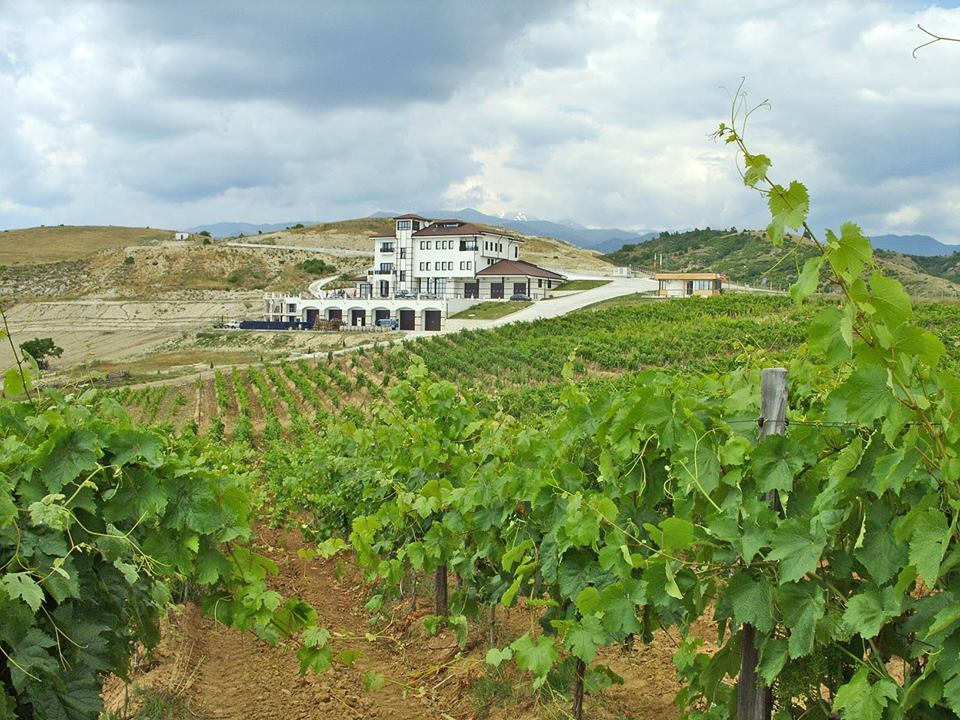
- Headquarters: Harsovo, Bulgaria
- Brands: Family Tradition, Bergulé, AplauZ
- Website: www.villamelnik.com

Villa Melnik is a family-owned winery located near the village of Harsovo, about 7 km south of Melnik, Bulgaria.

The winery has 30 hectares of vineyards. Grown are local (reds: Shiroka Melnishka Loza, also known as Broadleaved Melnik Vine, Melnik 55, Ruen, Melnik 1300, Mavrud; whites: Tamyanka, Keratzuda, Sandanski Misket) and international (reds: Cabernet Sauvignon, Merlot, Syrah, Pinot Noir, Sangiovese; whites: Viognier, Chardonnay, Sauvignon Blanc) varieties. The vineyards were planted in 2004, the winery was built in 2013. Produced are three main brands of wines - AplauZ, Bergulé, Family Tradition, as well as some Special wines - Orange Wine, Hailstorm, Sweet Wine - late harvest, Rare Varieties, and other limited edition wines.

Wine Cellar Villa Melnik is ranked #39 in the top 50 World's Best Vineyards 2020.

The winery is open for wine tours and wine tasting every day

== Terroir ==
The 30 hectares of own vineyards are situated on the hills between Harsovo and Vinogradi Village, Melnik Region, Struma River Valley, PGI Thracian Valley. They are surrounded by the mountains Pirin, Belasitsa, Slavyanka, which provide constant cooling breeze and a favorable temperature amplitude during the days and nights. The climate is Mediterranean - with long, hot dry summers and mild winters. The hills are exposed to the South.

The vineyards grow on sandy hills with some limestone and volcanic deposits. Nearby is the extinct volcano Kozhuh.

Villa Melnik puts great emphasis on sustainable practices without the use of any chemicals or pesticides in the vineyards. Most vineyards operations are completed by hand, including harvesting.

== The Winery ==
Villa Melnik is a modern state-of-the-art winery. The building is on three floors and is partially dug into the sandy hills. The production process is gravitational, which means that the grapes, juice, must, and wine flow through the three levels of the winery only using the force of gravity. This is allows the wine to go through the production process stress-free, with minimal mechanical pressure or human intervention, resulting in gentle extraction and maceration and wines with balanced flavors and soft tannins. The gravity method also ensures energy-efficiency.

The wines ferment in stainless steel tanks and age in oak barrels. Villa Melnik uses French, American and Bulgarian oak 225L barrels. The barrels and bottles are aged in underground tunnels-cellars deep into the sandy hills under naturally constant temperature and humidity. Many traditional old houses and wineries in the Melnik region have similar underground cellars.

The production process is a closed cycle: after extraction of the grape juice and maceration, the pumice is used as fertilizer for the gardens around the winery. The water used in production is recycled and reused.

== Wine Tourism ==
Villa Melnik is one of Bulgaria's top wine tourism destinations. The winery is open for tours and tasting daily. There are numerous events, cultural festivals, farmer's markets, exhibitions, and workshops that take place in the winery. It is also open for private and corporate events and weddings.

== The Family ==
The founders of Wine Cellar Villa Melnik are Nikola and Lyubka Zikatanov. Their daughter, Militza Zikatanova heads marketing and sales for the family business. Their son, Alex, is considered by some, the hope of the winery.

== Awards ==
SMV Canada - Selections Mondiales des Vins 2020:

- Double Gold medal and Jury's Award – Aplauz Cabernet Sauvignon 2017

SMV Canada - Selections Mondiales des Vins 2017:

- Gold medal – Aplauz, Syrah, Reserve, 2014
- Silver Medal – Bergule Melnik & Pinot Noir 2014

SMV Canada - Selections Mondiales des Vins 2016:

- Gold medal – Aplauz, Cabernet Sauvignon, Reserve, 2013

SMV Canada - Selections Mondiales des Vins 2014:

- Gold medal – Aplauz, Cabernet Sauvignon, Reserve, 2011

Decanter World Wine Awards 2015:

- Silver medal – Aplauz, Melnik 55, Reserve, 2013
- Bronze medal – Aplauz, Cabernet Sauvignon, Reserve, 2012

Mundus Vini 2019 – Spring Tasting, Germany:

- Silver Medal – Aplauz Cabernet Sauvignon Reserve 2015

Mundus Vini 2018, Germany

- Silver Medal – Rare Varieties Melnik 1300 Jubilee 2016

Mundus Vini 2017 – Spring Tasting, Germany:

- Silver Medal – Aplauz, Merlot, Reserve, 2013 (89 points

Mundus Vini 2016:

- Gold Medal – Aplauz, Cabernet Sauvignon, Reserve, 2013 (91 points)

Concours Mondial de Bruxelles 2019:

- Gold Medal – Hailstorm 2019
- Gold Medal – Aplauz Merlot 2019

Concours Mondial de Bruxelles 2017:

- Gold Medal – Bergule Cuvee 2012
- Silver Medal – Orange Wine 2016

Concours Mondial de Bruxelles 2016:

- Gold Medal – Aplauz, Cabernet Sauvignon, Premium Reserve, 2013

Shangai International Wine Challenge 2018

- Silver Medal – Aplauz Cabernet Sauvignon Reserve 2014
- Bronze Medal – Bergule Cuvee 2013

International Exhibition of Vine-Growing and Wine Producing Vinaria 2011:

- Gold medal – Aplauz, Syrah, Reserve, 2010
- Bronze medal – Aplauz, Merlot, Reserve, 2010
- Bronze medal – Bergule, Rose, Merlot & Syrah 2010

International Exhibition of Vine-Growing and Wine Producing Vinaria 2012:

- Gold medal – Family Selection, Cabernet Sauvignon & Syrah & Merlot, 2011
- Gold medal – Aplauz, Merlot & Syrah, Reserve, 2010

Balkan International Wine Competition 2012:

- Gold medal - Aplauz, Melnik 55, Reserve, 2010
- Silver medal - Bergule, Chardonnay & Viognier, 2011

Balkan International Wine Competition 2013:

- Gold medal – Bergule, Mavrud, 2011
- Silver medal – Bergule, Chardonnay & Viognier, 2012
- Silver medal – Bergule, Viognier, 2012
- Silver medal – Aplauz, Cabernet Sauvignon, Reserve, 2011
- Bronze medal – Family Tradition, Cabernet Sauvignon & Merlot, 2011

Balkan International Wine Competition 2014:

- Gold medal – Aplauz, Viognier, 2013
- Silver medal – Bergule, Pinot Noir, 2012
- Silver medal – Aplauz, Melnik 55, Reserve, 2011
- Bronze medal – Aplauz, Rose, 2013

Selections Mondiales des Vins Canada International Wine Championship 21st edition 2014:

- Gold medal – Aplauz, Cabernet Sauvignon, Reserve, 2011

Balkan International Wine Competition 2015:

- Silver medal – Aplauz, Melnik 55, Reserve, 2013
- Silver medal – Aplauz, Mavrud, Reserve, 2013
- Bronze medal – Bergule, Viognier & Chardonnay, 2013
- Bronze medal – Family Tradition, Melnik, 2013
- Bronze medal – Bergule, Melnik, 2013

Decanter World Wine Awards 2015:

- Silver medal – Aplauz, Melnik 55, Reserve, 2013
- Bronze medal – Aplauz, Cabernet Sauvignon, Reserve, 2012

International Wine Competition for local grape varieties – Vino Balkanika 2015

- Gold medal – Aplauz, Mavrud, Reserve, 2013
- Silver medal – Bergule, Melnik, 2013
- Silver medal – Aplauz, Melnik, Reserve, 2013

International Exhibition of Vine-Growing and Wine Producing Vinaria 2015:

- Silver medal – Bergule, Melnik, 2013
- Silver medal – Aplauz, Melnik 55, Reserve, 2013
- Silver medal – Aplauz, Cabernet Sauvignon, Reserve, 2012
- Silver medal – Aplauz, Syrah, Reserve, 2011
- Silver medal – Bergule, Chardonnay, 2013

Balkan International Wine Competition 2016:

- Silver Medal - Aplauz, Merlot, Reserve 2013
- Silver Medal - Bergulé, Melnik & Pinot Noir, 2013
