= Ilija Antonovic =

Serbian merchant and philanthropist (1843–1915)

Ilija Antonović
- Илија Антоновић
- Born: April 3, 1843; Melnik
- Died: July 26, 1915 (aged 72)
- Occupation(s): merchant and philanthropist

Ilija Antonović (Serbian Cyrillic: Илија Антоновић; 3 May 1843 – 26 July 1915) was a Serbian merchant and a great benefactor of the University of Belgrade and other charities.

== Biography ==
Ilija Antonović was born in 1843 in Melnik, near the border of Ottoman Serbia (now North Macedonia), to Anton and Lascarina. He studied in a Greek school. He worked for his relative Anastas Zach, and later opened his own iron business and became rich. He left all his wealth to University of Belgrade and the Belgrade Trade Youth (Beogradske Trgovačke Omladine).

Coming to Belgrade from the region of South Serbia, Ilija Antonović found an opportunity dealing in steel when it became a valued commodity before and after the turn of the century. When he died in Belgrade in 1915, he bequeathed all his possessions to the University of Belgrade, the Belgrade Gymnasium for Girls, a Belgrade hospital, women's associations, etc. To the Beogradske Trgovačke Omladine (Belgrade Merchants Youth association) he bequeathed a building at 16 Krgujevac Street (Kragujevačkoj ulici Broj 16), with its entire revenue going towards the spiritual and moral education of Belgrade youth pursuing a degree in commerce and business administration. He also bequeathed the Serbian Orthodox Cathedral in Belgrade the sum of 250 dinars in memory of his deceased brother. He was a regular subscriber and supporter of the periodical Svetlosti, an organ of the Society of Light (Društvo Svetlost) based in Belgrade and Nikšić (in modern Montenegro).
