= Andriy Melnyk =

Andriy Melnyk may refer to:

- Andriy Melnyk (officer) (Andriy Atanasovych Melnyk, 1890–1964), Ukrainian military and political leader, member of the Organization of Ukrainian Nationalists
- Andriy Anatoliyovych Melnyk, president of the Handball Federation of Ukraine
- Andriy Melnyk (diplomat) (Andriy Yaroslavovych Melnyk, born 1975), Ukrainian ambassador
