= Siroka Melniska =

Variety of grape

Shiroka Melnishka
- Grape (Vitis)
- Color of berry skin: Noir
- Species: Vitis vinifera
- Also called: Melnik and other synonyms
- Origin: Bulgaria
- VIVC number: 11838

Shiroka Melnishka, (Bulgarian: Широка мелнишка лоза / Šhiroka Melnišhka loza), often called Melnik (Мелник, distinct from other varieties named after the town) or Broadleafed Melnik, is a red Bulgarian wine grape variety. It is planted primarily near the Greek border. In Bulgarian the grape's name means "broad-leaved vine of Melnik". As a varietal, Shiroka Melnishka has an affinity for oak which can produce pronounced tobacco notes. The wines are often compared to Châteauneuf-du-Pape with its similar profile of spice and power. The wine was a particular favourite of British Prime Minister Winston Churchill. Notable producers of wine from the variety are Abdyika Vineyard, Villa Melnik, Damianitza, Logodaj and Sintica wineries.

== Synonyms ==
Other transliterations that have been attested include Chiroka Melnichka Losa, Chiroka Melnichka, Melnik, Shiroka Melnichka Loza, Shiroka Melnishka, and Shiroka Melnishka Loza.

== Related Varieties ==
The traditional Broadleafed Melnik grape ripens late, and is harvested as late as October. This makes fully ripened grapes difficult to achieve, as the climate in south-west Bulgaria is becoming cold and damp by this time. In the 20th century there have been number of experimental hybrids made of various varieties to try to develop them in a way more suitable for Bulgarian vineyards. In 1963 a mixture of pollen from Valdiguié, Durif, Jurançon and Cabernet Sauvignon was used to hybridise with the Broadleafed Melnik vine. The resultant variety was approved for use in 1977 but was not much taken up until the first professional fermentation of it in 1999 generated more interest. The variety is called under various synonyms: Melnik 55, or Early Melnik, or Ranna Melnishka Loza (Bulgarian: Ранна мелнишка лоза / Ranna melniška loza). Genetic testing has now shown the pollen parent was in fact Valdiguié. The resultant wine is usually quite different from that made from Broadleafed Melnik, although some bottles confusingly still bear front labels calling the wine merely "Melnik".
