= Melnik, Bulgaria =

Melnik Мелник
- Town
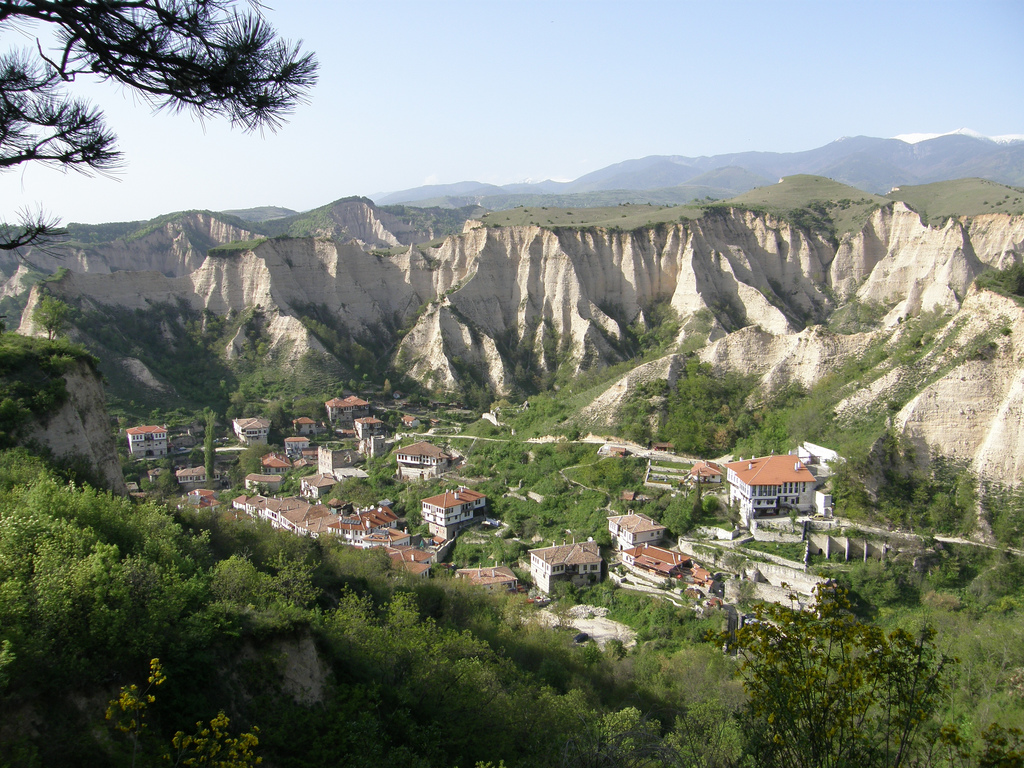

- Location of Melnik, Bulgaria
- Coordinates: 41°31′N 23°24′E
- Country: Bulgaria
- Province (Oblast): Blagoevgrad

Government
  - Mayor: Atanas Petev (2015)
- Elevation: 437 m (1,434 ft)

Population (2008-06-16)
  - Total: 385
- Time zone: UTC+2 (EET)
  - Summer (DST): UTC+3 (EEST)
- Postal Code: 2820
- Area code: 07437

Melnik (Bulgarian: Мелник [ˈmɛɫnik], Greek: Μελένικο, Meleniko) is a town in Blagoevgrad Province, Southwestern Bulgaria, in the Southwestern Pirin Mountains, about 440 m above sea level. The town is an architectural reserve and 96 of its buildings are cultural monuments. With a population of 385, it is the smallest town in Bulgaria, retaining its town status today for historical reasons. It is situated on the foothills of the Pirin mountain range and is overlooked by the Melnik Earth Pyramids.

== History ==
According to archaeological evidence, the first to settle in the area were the Thracian tribe Medi to which the famous rebel Spartacus belonged. Centuries later, the presence of the Romans left the town one of its landmarks — the Ancient Roman bridge, which is still preserved. The region was infused by Greek culture and later became part of the Byzantine Empire. The Slavs who later came in these parts named the settlement Melnik after the sand formations surrounding it on all sides (the Bulgarian word мел mel means "white clay, chalk"). Melnik became a part of the First Bulgarian Empire under the rule of Khan Presian I (836-852) and prospered greatly in the period. Melnik became the capital of an independent feudal principality ruled by Despot Alexius Slav, a descendant of the Asen dynasty, in 1209, and passed through an economic and cultural upsurge during his reign. The town continued to flourish under Tsar Ivan Asen II because of the duty-free trade with Venetian-ruled Dubrovnik.

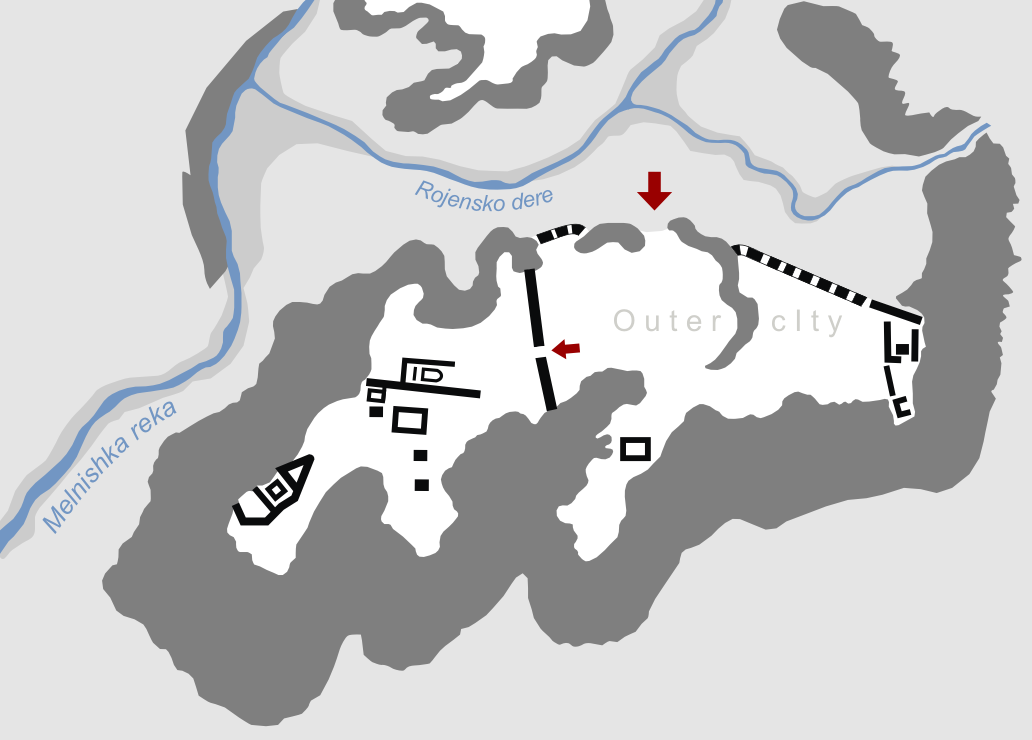
Plan of the medieval fortress

The Ottoman conquest of the Balkans in the 14th-15th century resulted in a long period of decline, but Melnik was once again a thriving town in the 17th and 18th century, the time of the Bulgarian National Revival, due to the tobacco and wine production, with wine being exported abroad, mainly to England and Austria. In that time Melnik was also a centre of craftsmanship, particularly church decoration and woodcarving. Many Bulgarian schools and churches were built in Melnik in that period.

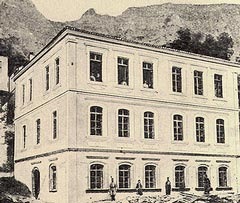
A Greek school of Melnik

Melnik was taken by the Imperial Russian Army during the Russo-Turkish War of 1877-1878, but was given back to the Ottoman Empire according to the Treaty of Berlin. The town was the centre of a kaza in the Sanjak of Siroz as Menlik (or Greek: Μελένικο, Meleniko) until 1912. During the First Balkan War, Melnik was ultimately liberated and became once again part of Bulgaria. In the late 18th century, the town had 1300 houses, seventy churches and a population of some 20,000 people, but a fire largely destroyed it. Since then it has been restored and rebuilt, and still, the current population of 400 is nowhere near the one from the beginning of the 20th century, when it primarily consisted of Greeks, but also of Bulgarians, Turks, Vlachs and Romani. Melnik is the subject of Yuri Trifonov's short story "The Smallest Town on Earth" (1967). According to the statistics of Vasil Kanchov ("Macedonia, Ethnography and Statistics"), Melnik used to have 2.650 Greek Christian, 950 Turkish, 500 Bulgarian Christian, 200 Romani and 30 Vlach inhabitants in 1900.

At the end of the Second Balkan War in 1913, the Greeks left Melnik and moved to Greece by the express orders of the Greek government; the order being given when it was known that Melnik was to be ceded to Bulgaria. According to Bulgarian claims submitted to the Carnegie Endowment for International Peace, some Bulgarian shops and houses were looted by retreating Greeks. The Greek population moved primarily to Sidirokastro and fewer settled in Serres and Thessaloniki.

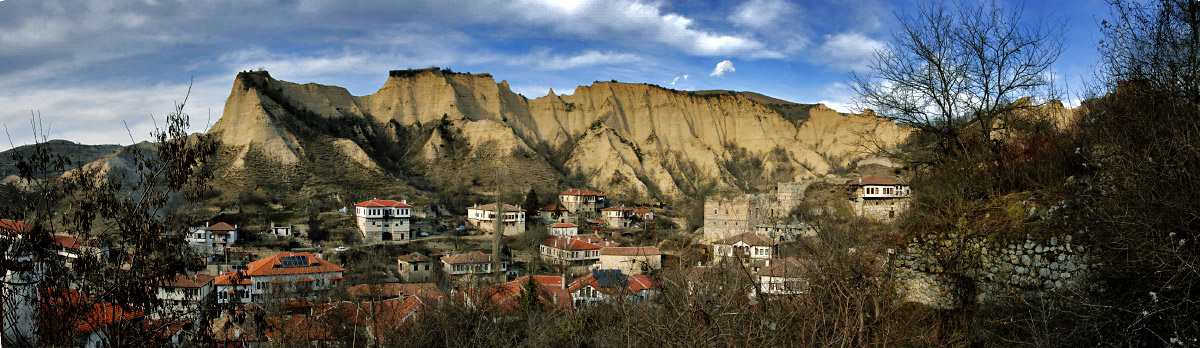
Panoramic overview of Melnik

== Climate ==
Melnik has a Mediterranean climate with hot summers and cool winters.

Climate table:

Climate data for Melnik
Month	Jan	Feb	Mar	Apr	May	Jun	Jul	Aug	Sep	Oct	Nov	Dec	Year
Mean daily maximum °C (°F)	6.5 (43.7)	8.8 (47.8)	14.5 (58.1)	20.9 (69.6)	26.5 (79.7)	31.2 (88.2)	34.3 (93.7)	34.7 (94.5)	28.4 (83.1)	21.5 (70.7)	14.6 (58.3)	7.5 (45.5)	20.8 (69.4)
Daily mean °C (°F)	2.6 (36.7)	4.2 (39.6)	8.7 (47.7)	14.1 (57.4)	20.1 (68.2)	23.3 (73.9)	26.2 (79.2)	26.1 (79.0)	21.3 (70.3)	15.2 (59.4)	8.7 (47.7)	3.8 (38.8)	14.6 (58.3)
Mean daily minimum °C (°F)	−1.7 (28.9)	−0.8 (30.6)	2.8 (37.0)	7.1 (44.8)	12.7 (54.9)	15.6 (60.1)	17.8 (64.0)	18.0 (64.4)	14.1 (57.4)	8.7 (47.7)	3.8 (38.8)	0.1 (32.2)	8.1 (46.6)
Average precipitation mm (inches)	58 (2.3)	49 (1.9)	49 (1.9)	54 (2.1)	62 (2.4)	59 (2.3)	29 (1.1)	21 (0.8)	40 (1.6)	54 (2.1)	77 (3.0)	63 (2.5)	643 (25.3)
Source 1: stringmeteo.com
Source 2: Hong Kong Observatory

== Sights and winemaking ==
The unique architecture of Melnik and the nearby Rozhen Monastery (located 6 km northeast of Melnik) make it a popular tourist destination. In addition, the town has been famous for producing strong wine since at least 1346. The local wine from the varietal Broad Leave Melnik Vine was reportedly a favourite of Winston Churchill's. Lately, the area of Melnik is enjoying a revival of vine growing and wine making. Several new, modern wineries have been built and operate (Villa Melnik Winery, Sintica Winery, Orbelus, etc.), producing high quality wine from local and international varieties.

Interesting architectural landmarks include the Byzantine House, one of the oldest civilian buildings in the Balkans (built probably in the 12th or 13th century as a Bulgarian fortress), the Kordopulov House (named after the merchant Manolis Kordopulou to whom it once belonged), which also has one of the largest wine cellars in Melnik, the Pashov House (1815), which houses the Historical Museum of Melnik and the Pasha's House, built by Ibrahim Bey, one of the richest beys in the region, during Ottoman rule. Some of the old churches in the town worth visiting are St Nicholas (built in the 13th century), SS Peter and Paul (1840), St Nicholas the Thaumaturge (1756) and St Anthony.

The area around Melnik is strikingly eroded, particularly the enormous area of cliff that serves as a backdrop to the town. This area, covering some 17 km^{2} near Melnik, Kurlanovo and Rozhen, has been called the Melnik Earth Pyramids or Melnik Badlands. The hills in this area can rise up to 100 metres (330 ft) high. The unique formations, which can resemble giant mushrooms, ancient towers, and obelisks, were formed when heavy rain eroded the sand and clay the hills are composed of.

== Notable people ==
- Anastasios Polyzoidis, Greek politician and judicial official
- Anastasios Christomanos, Greek chemist
- Emanuil Vaskidovich, Bulgarian National Revival educator of Greek descent
- Ilija Antonovic, Serbian merchant and a great benefactor
- Ivan Anastasov, IMRO revolutionary of Greek descent

== Honours ==
Melnik Ridge and its summit Melnik Peak on Livingston Island in the South Shetland Islands, Antarctica are named for Melnik.

== Gallery ==
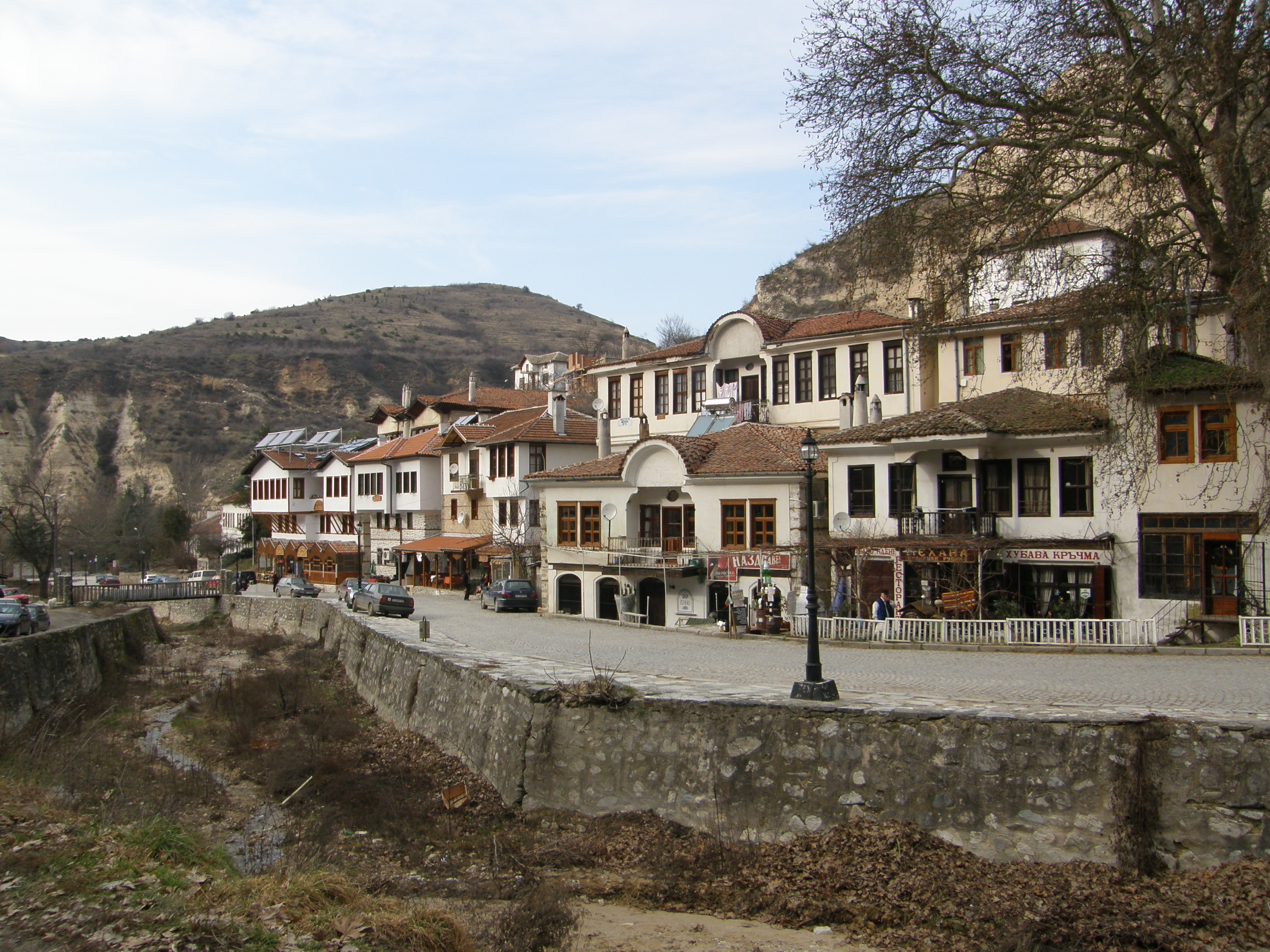
Overview

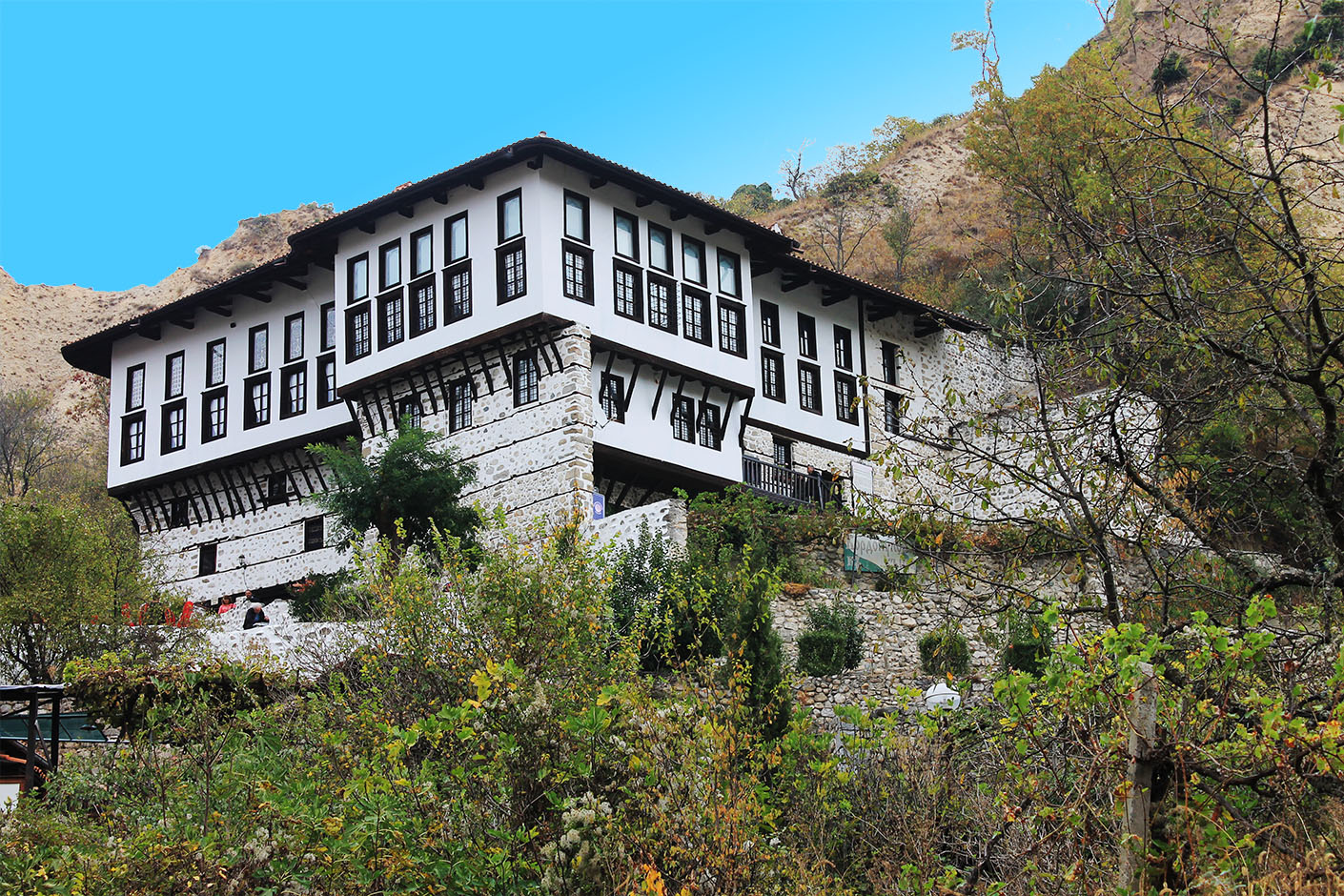
The Kordopulov House in winter

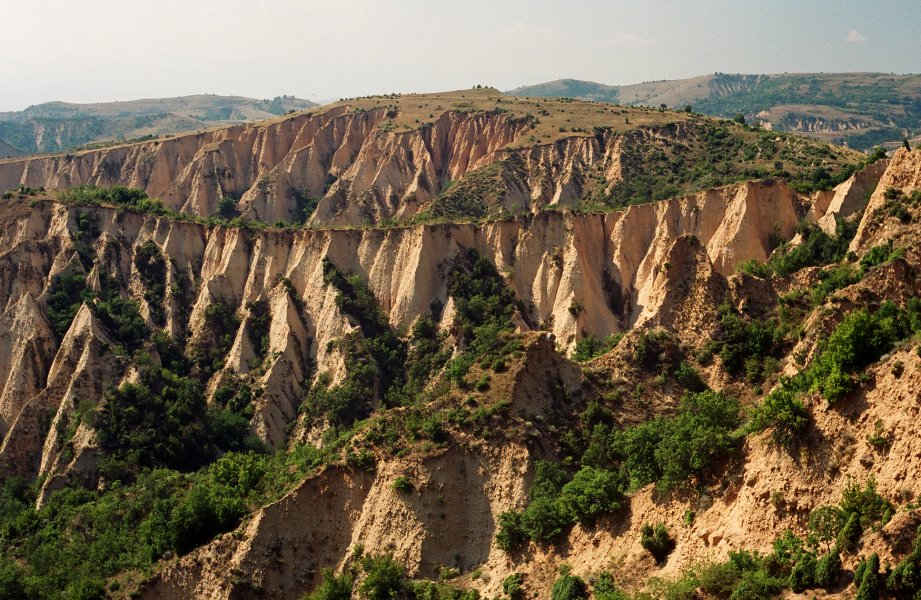
The famous sand pyramids

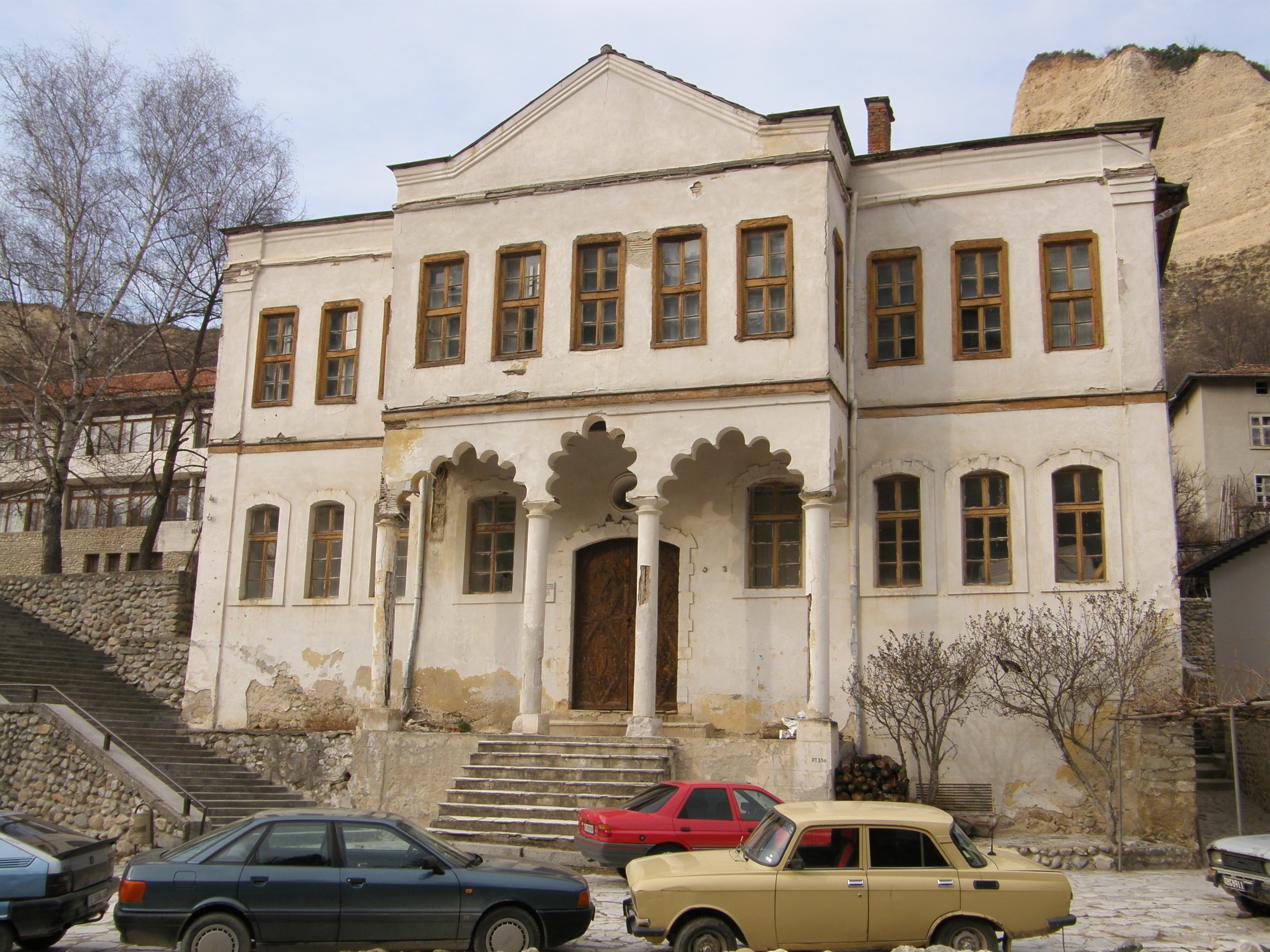
The Ottoman konak

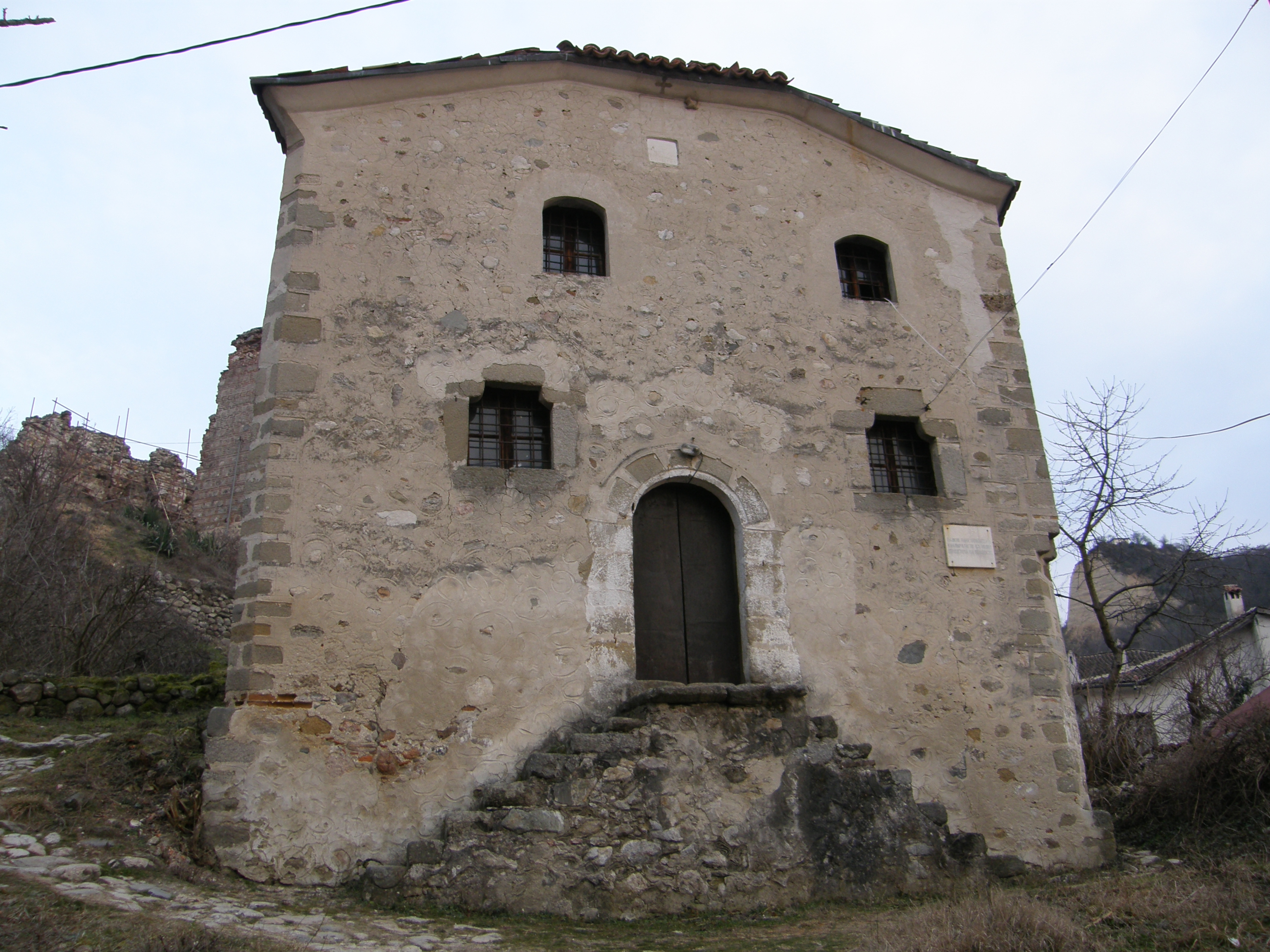
Basilica of St Anthony (1765)

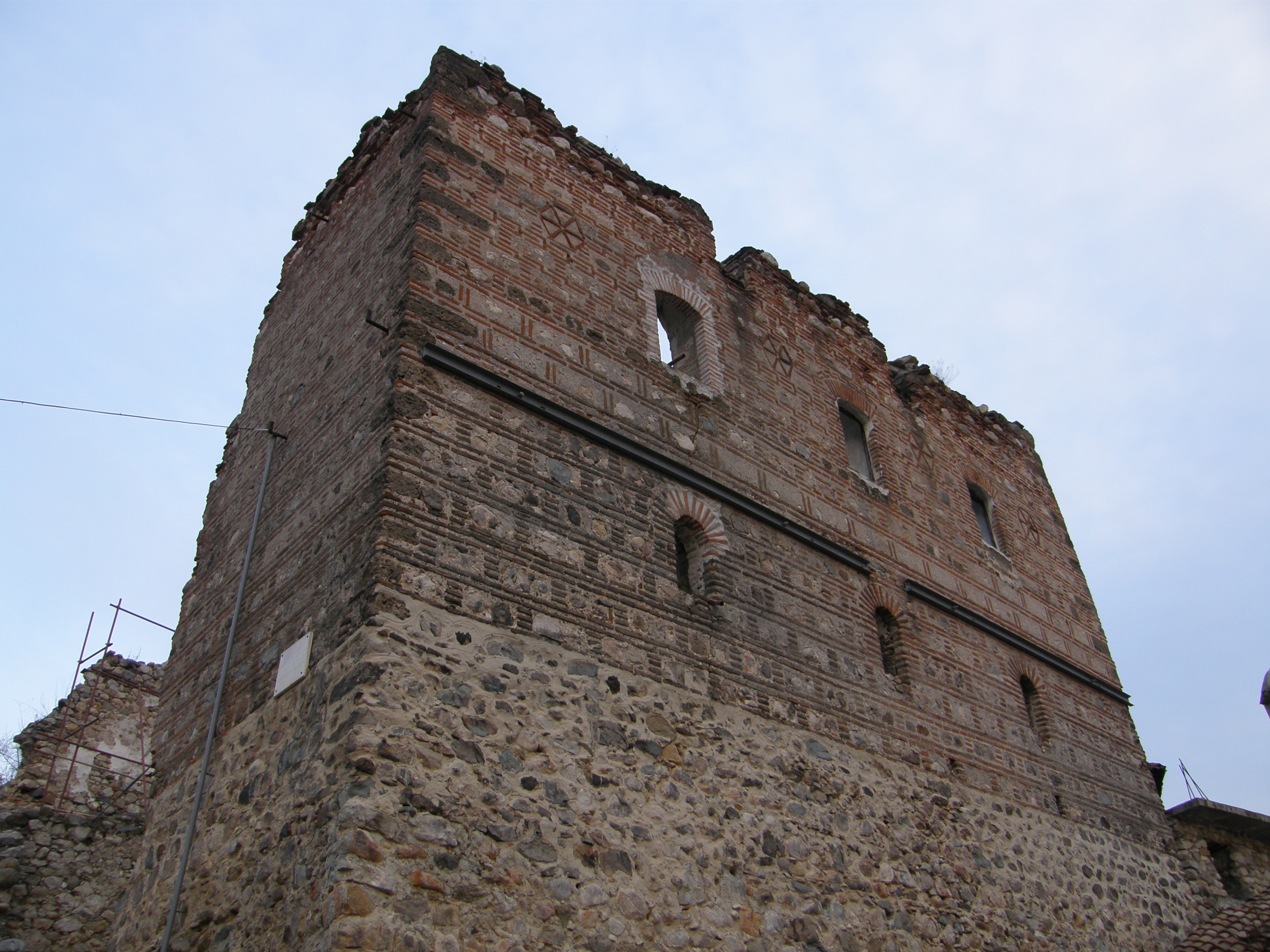
The Byzantine House (12th–13th century)

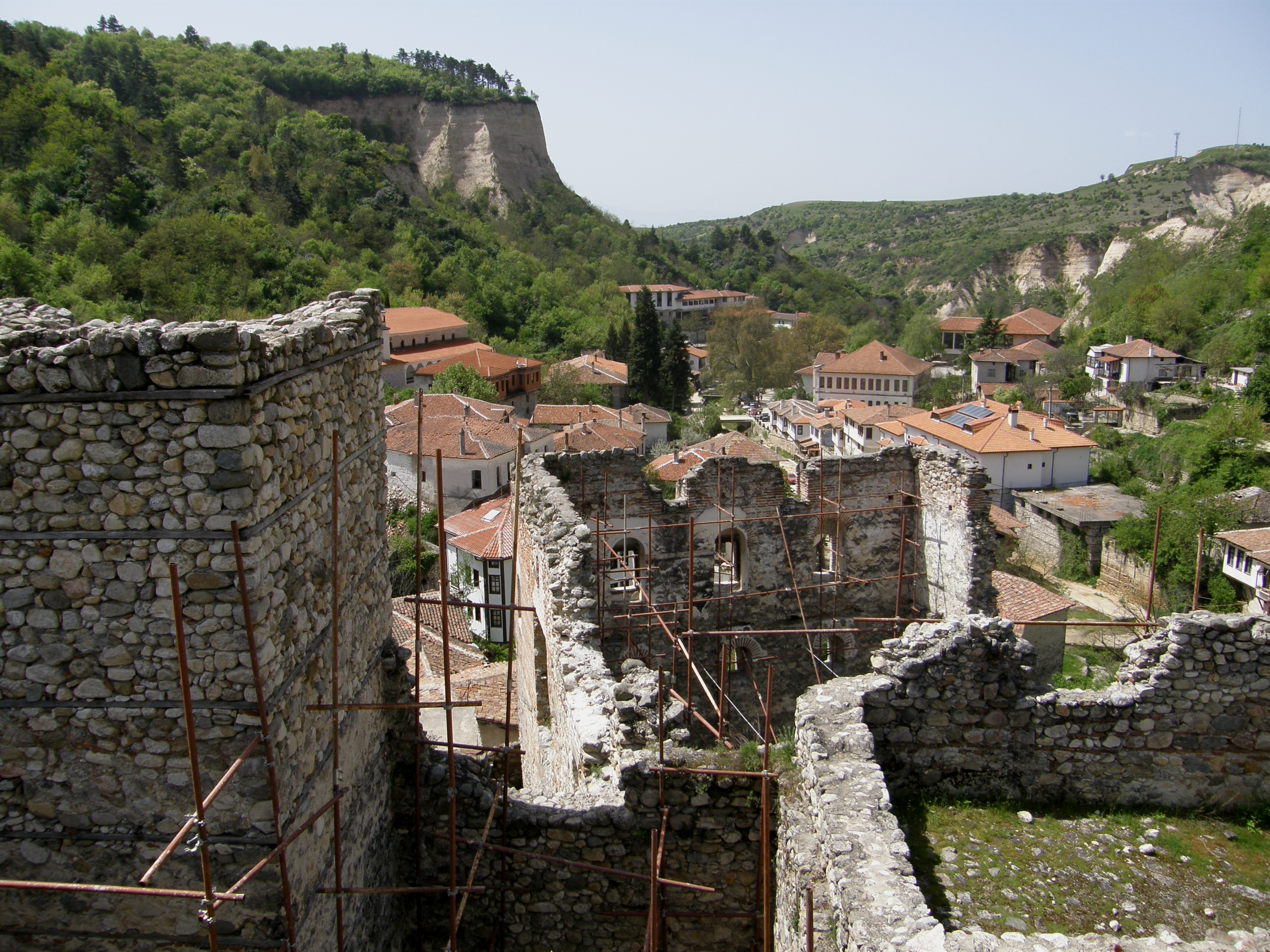

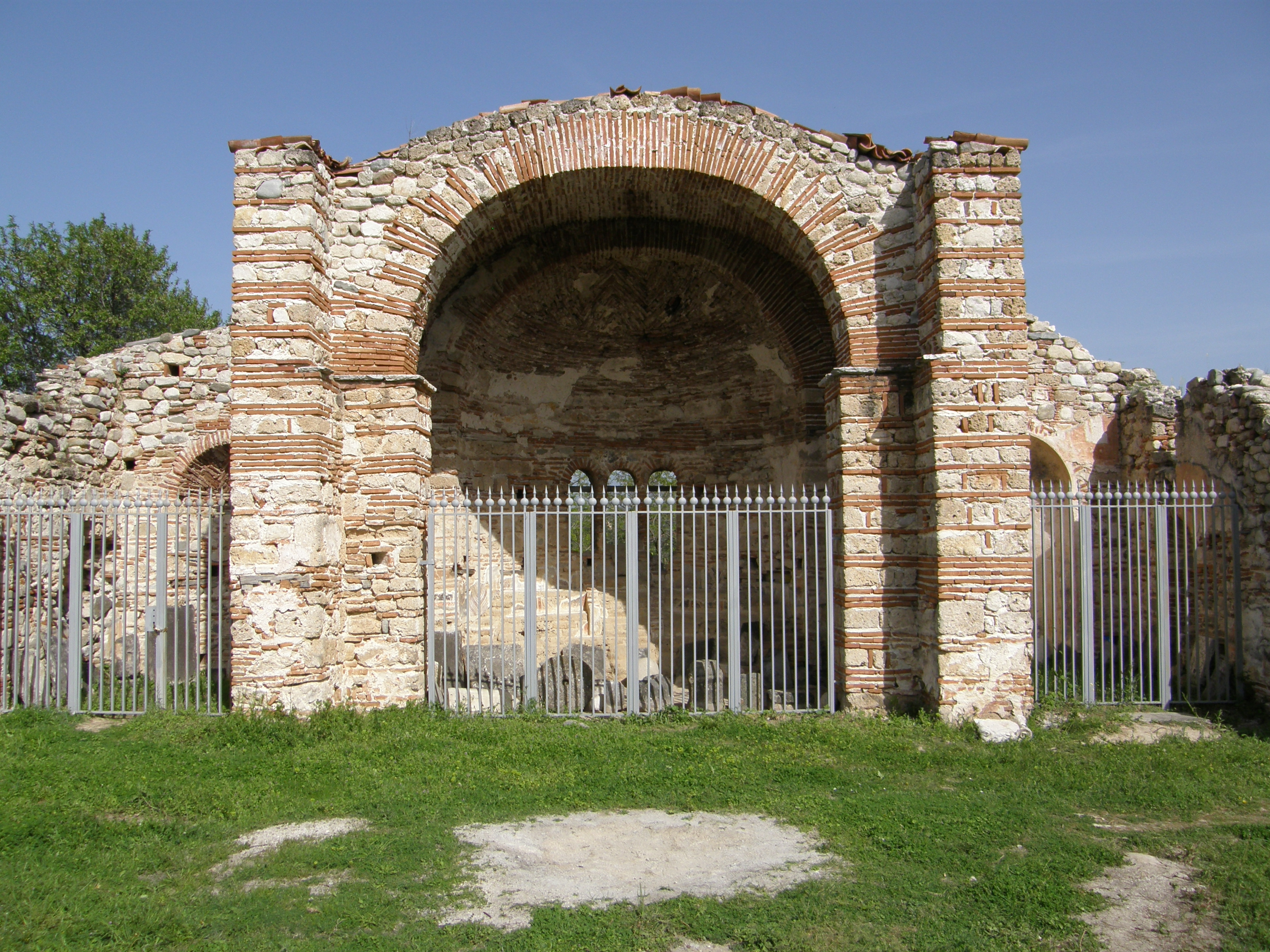
Ruins of the St Nicholas Church

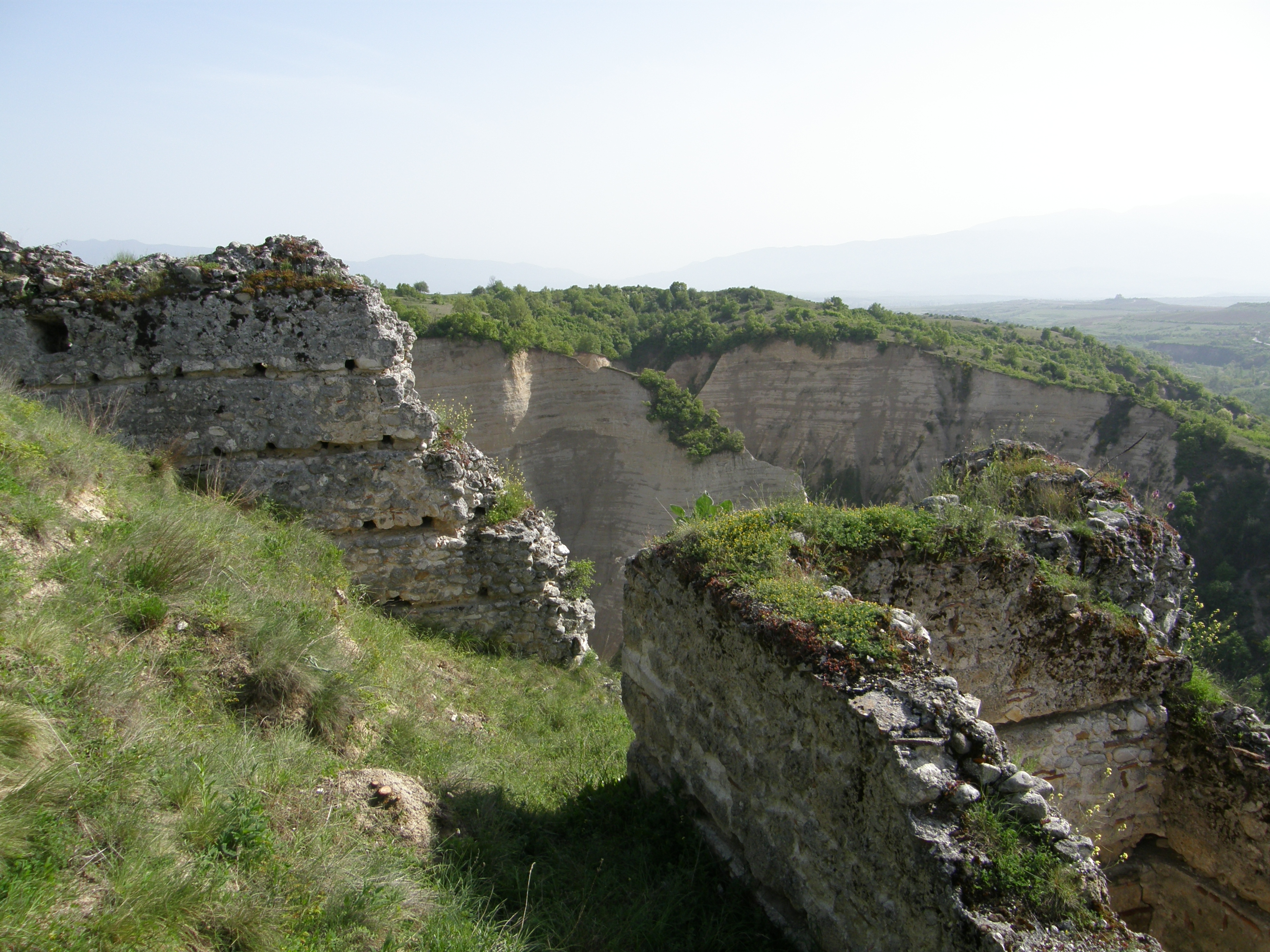
Despot Slav's Fortress

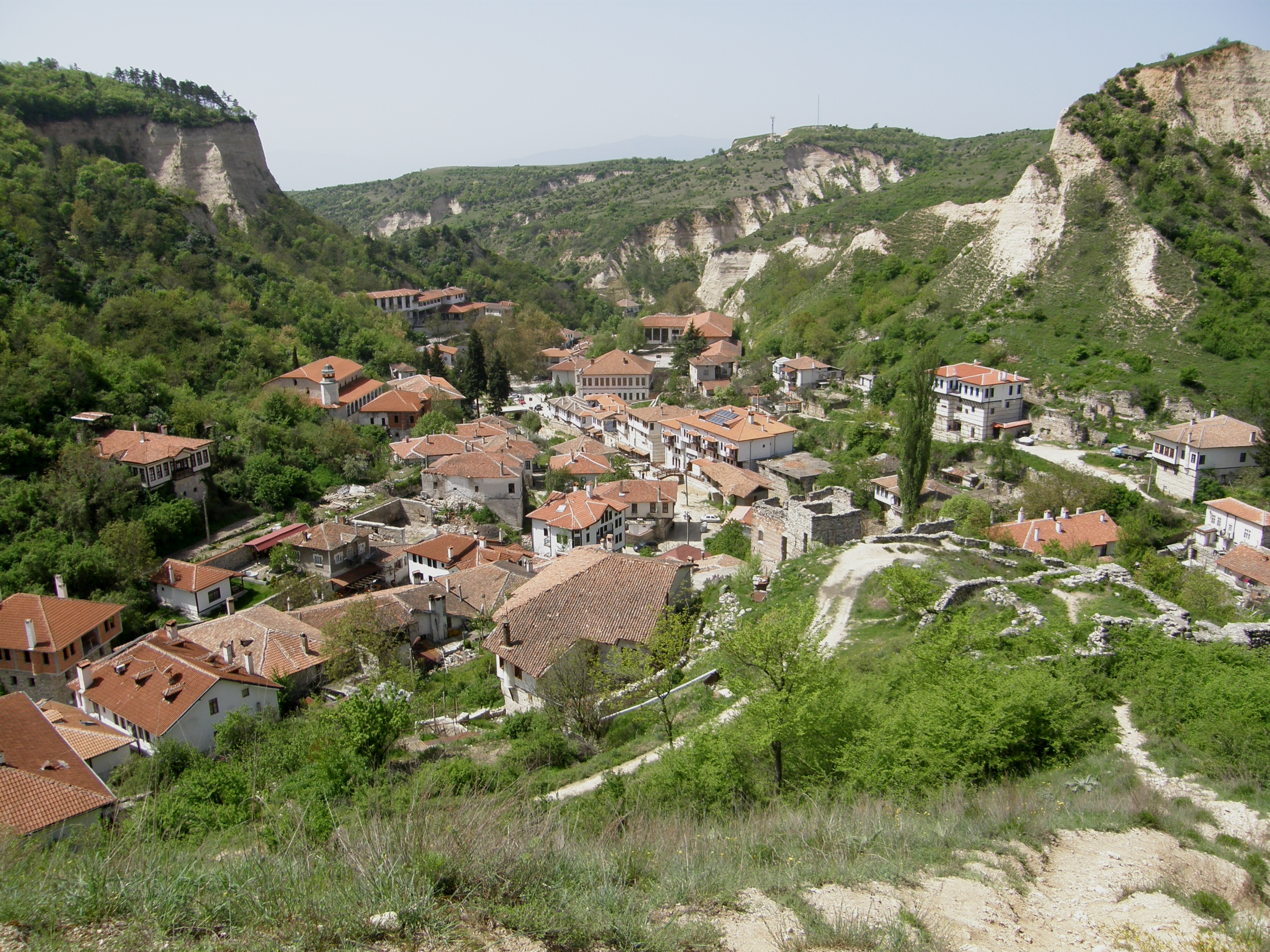
View of Melnik

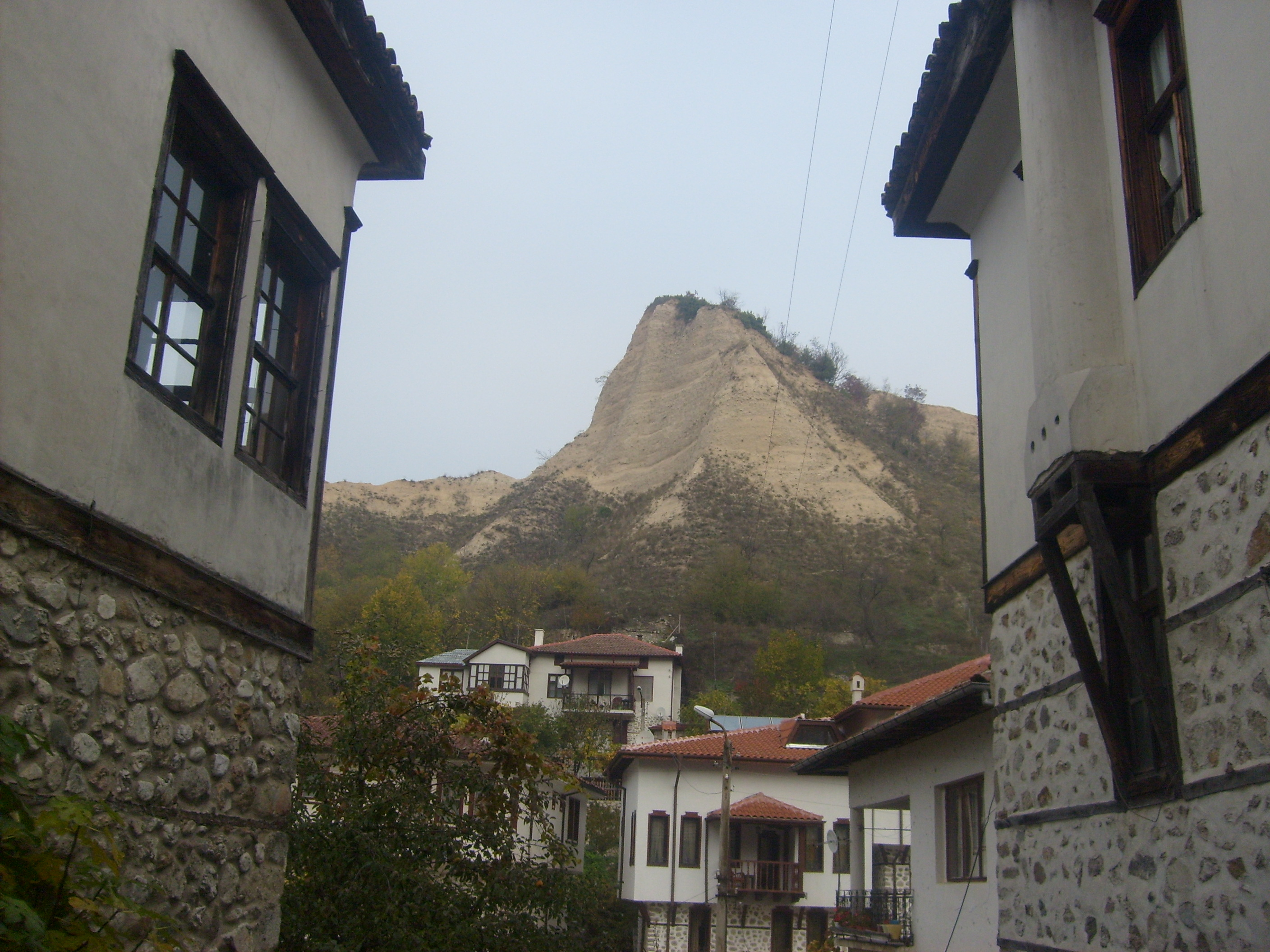

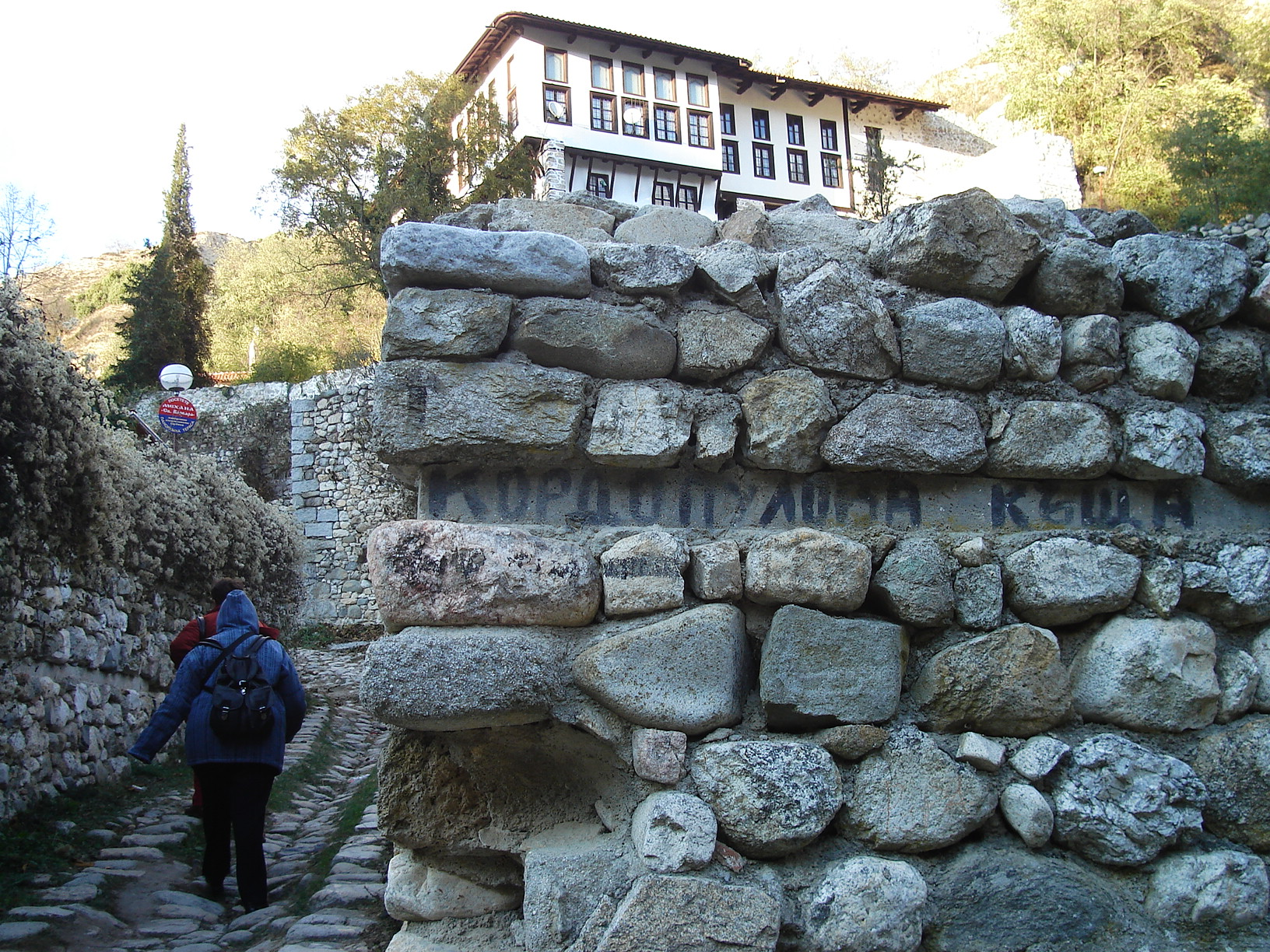

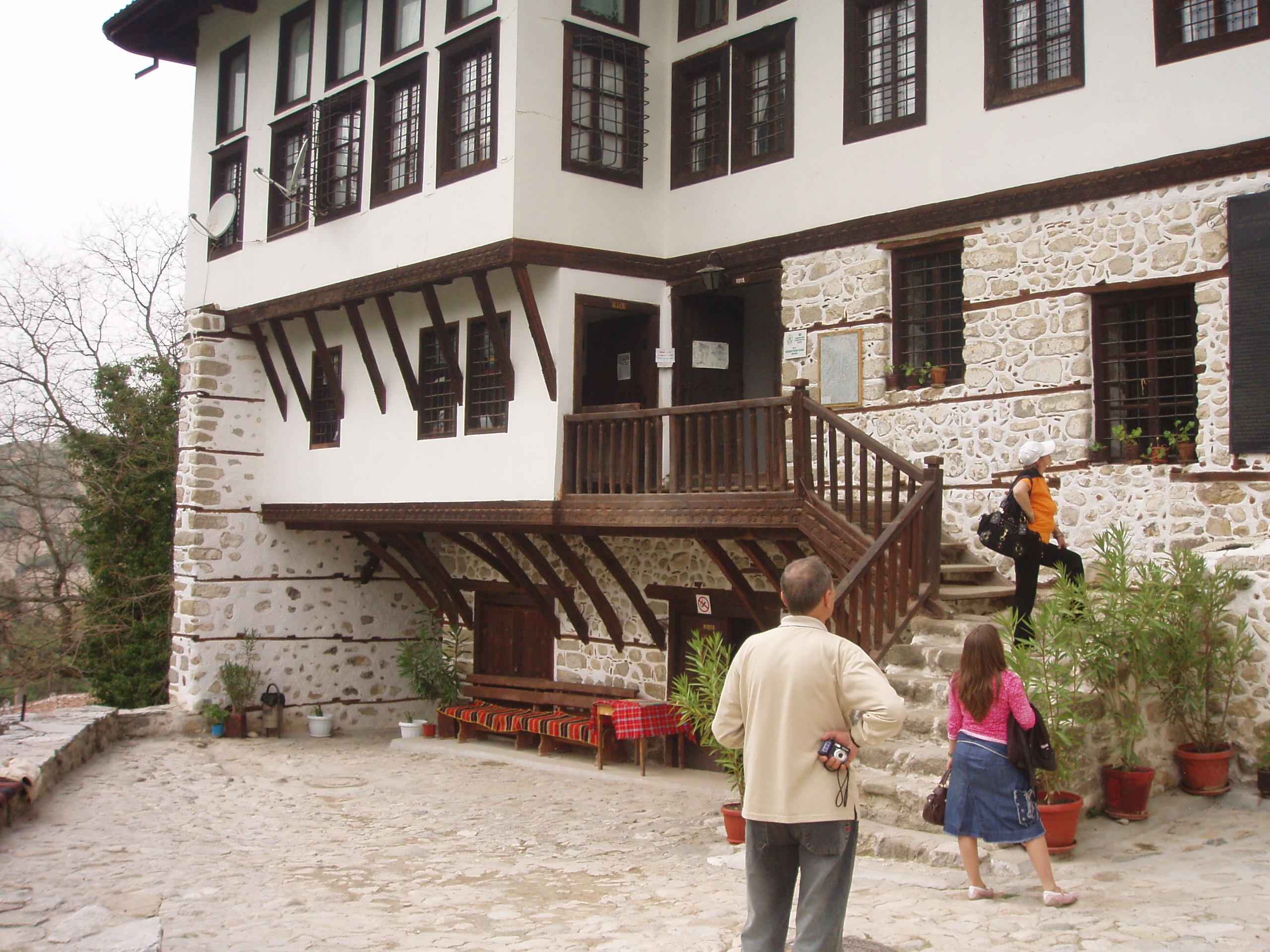

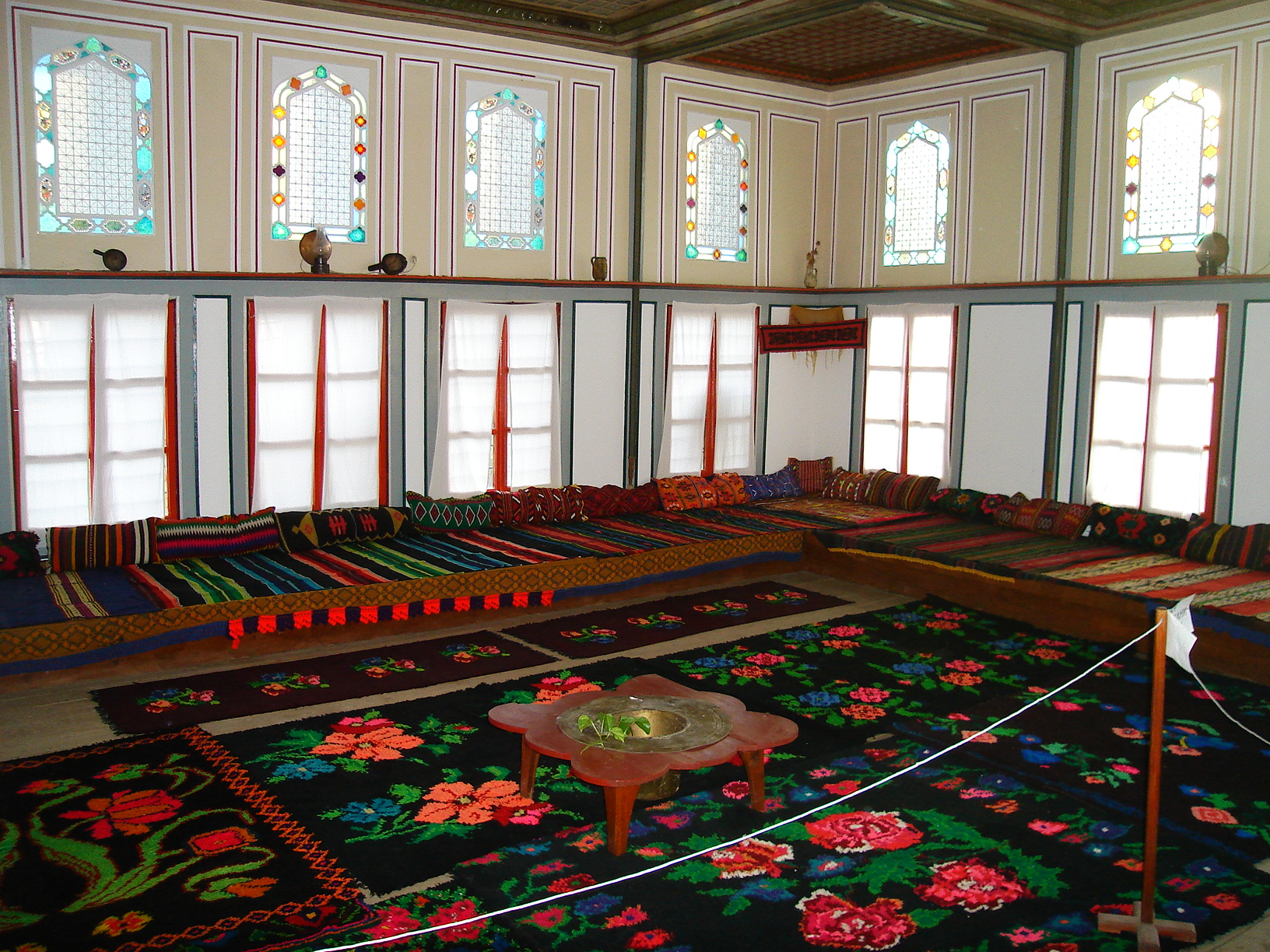

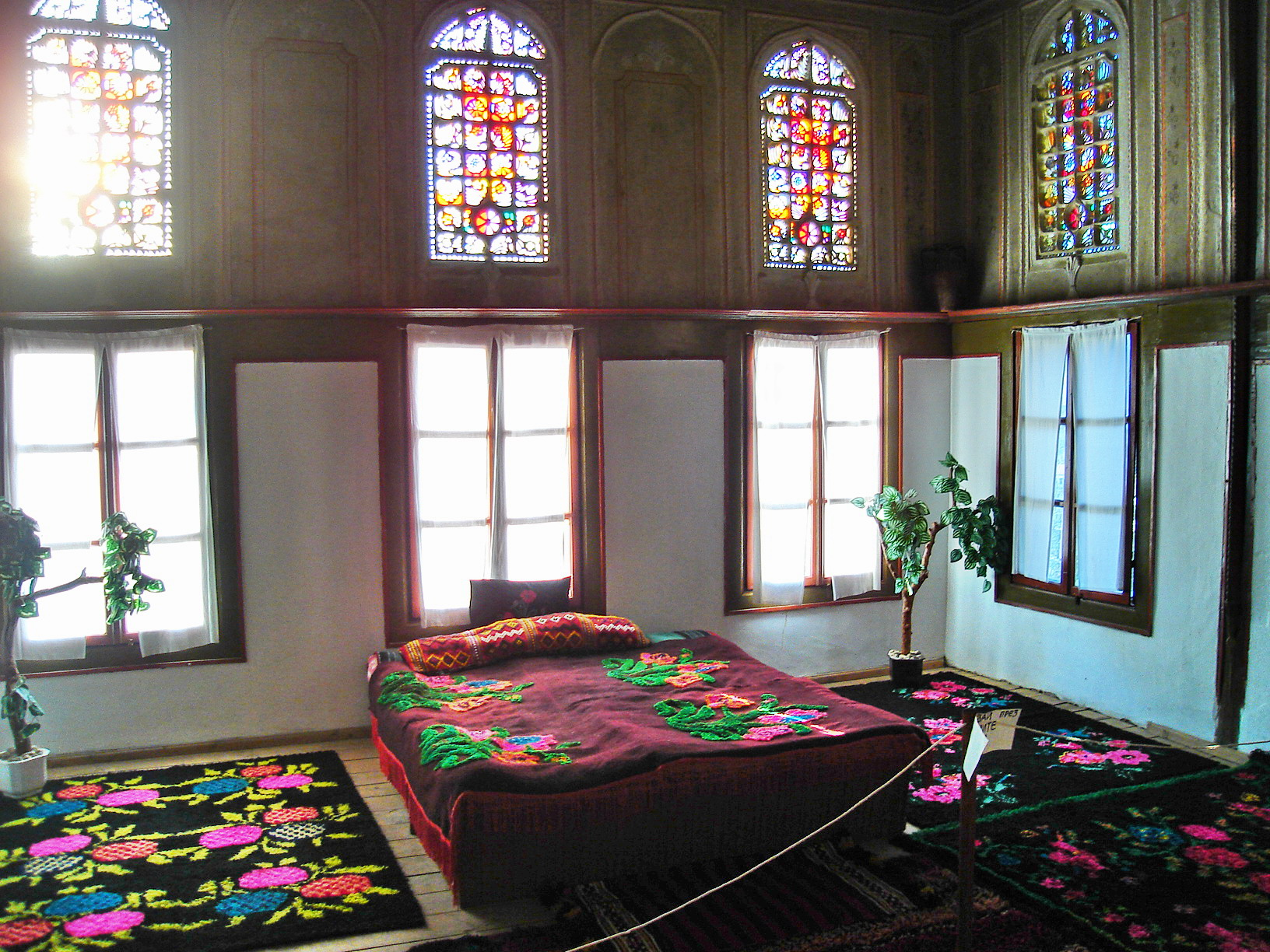

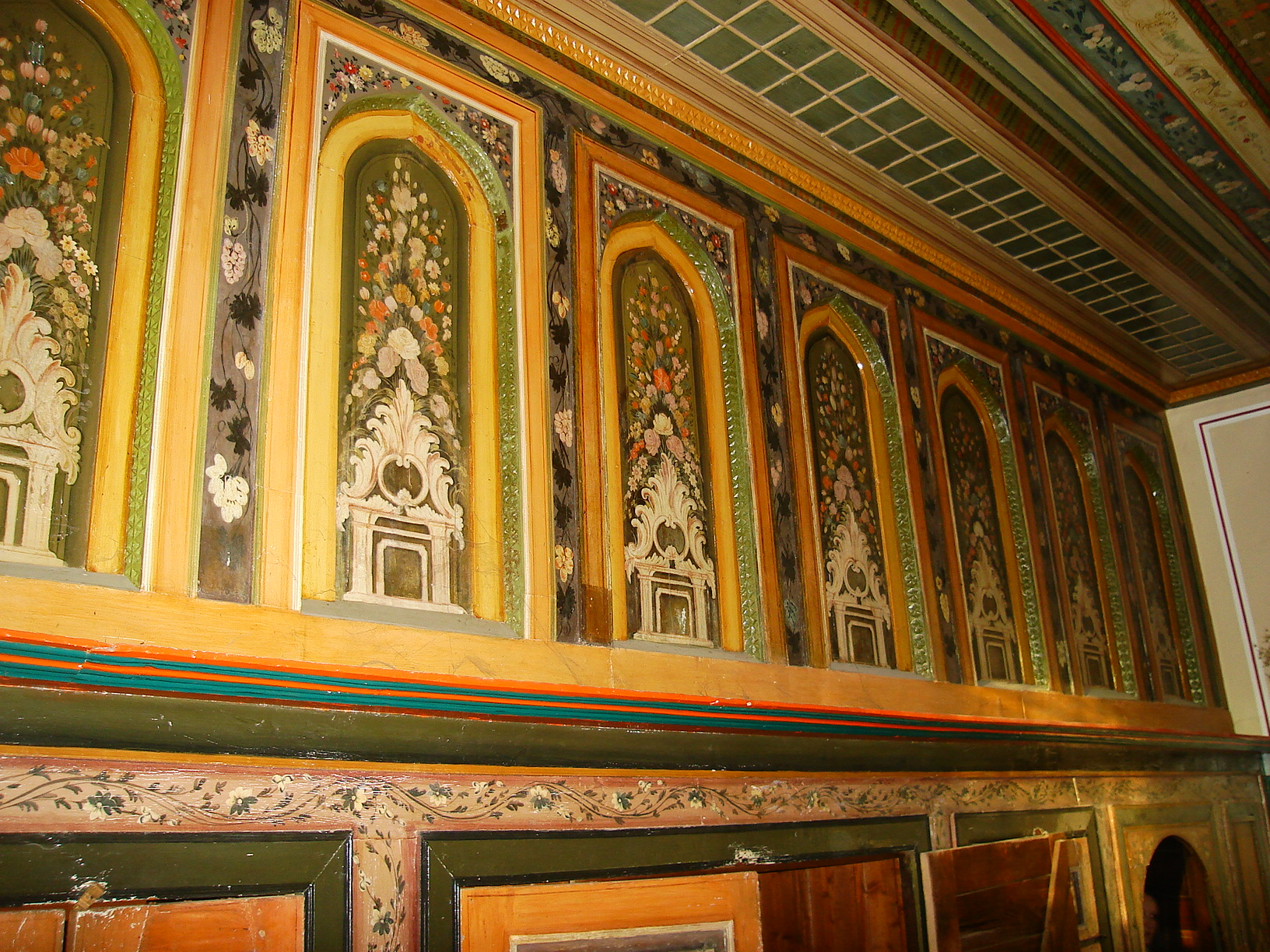

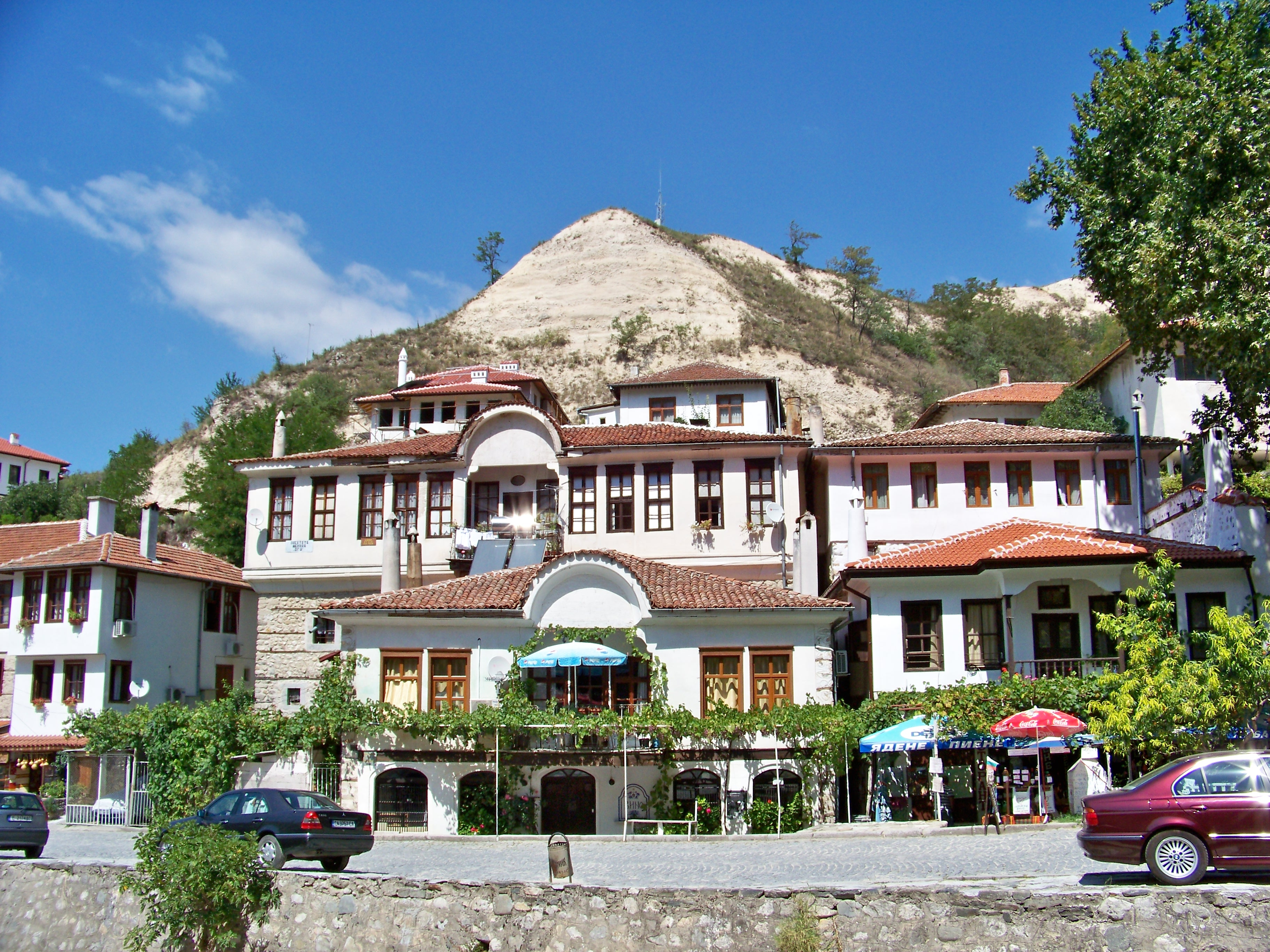

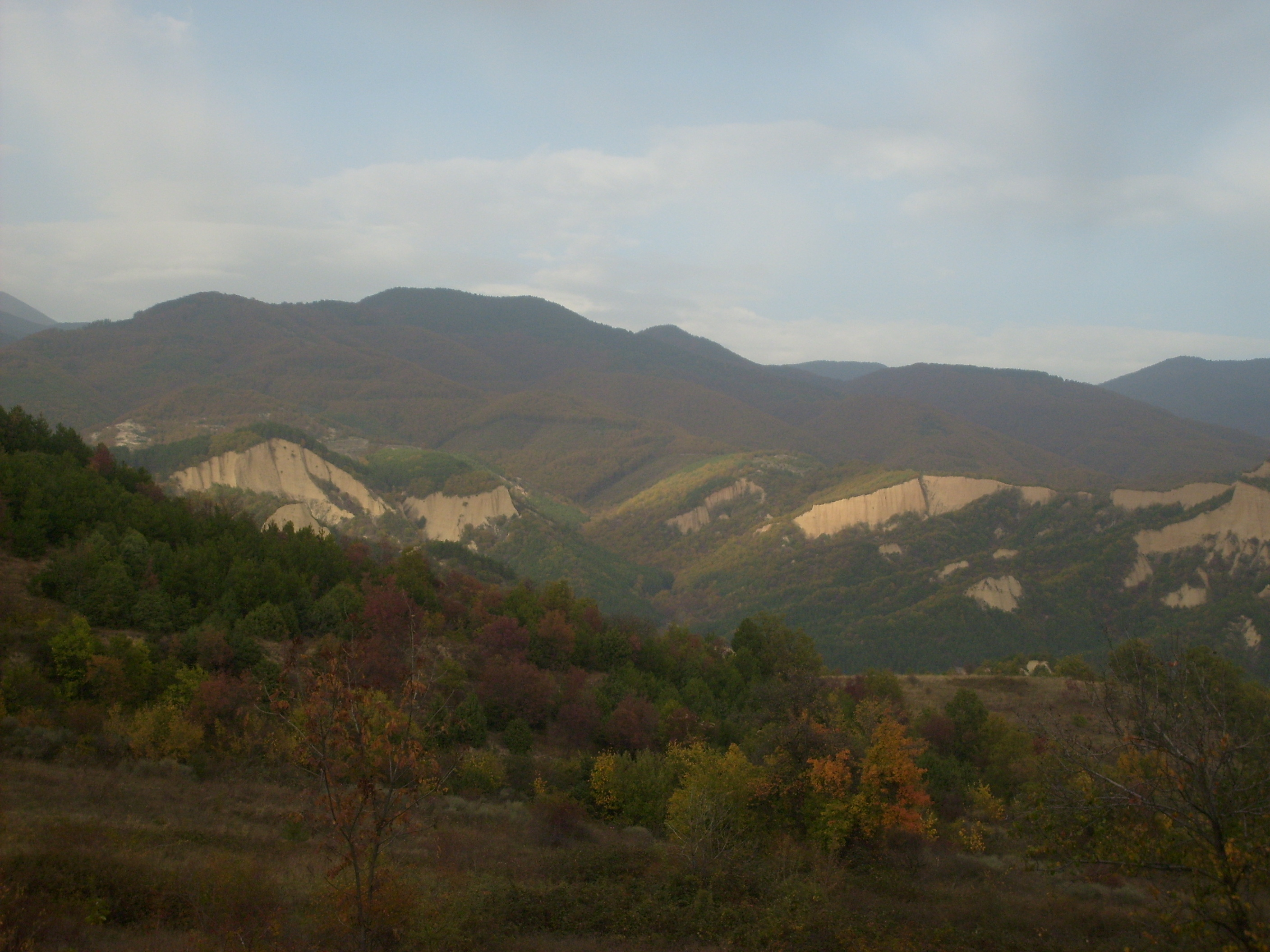

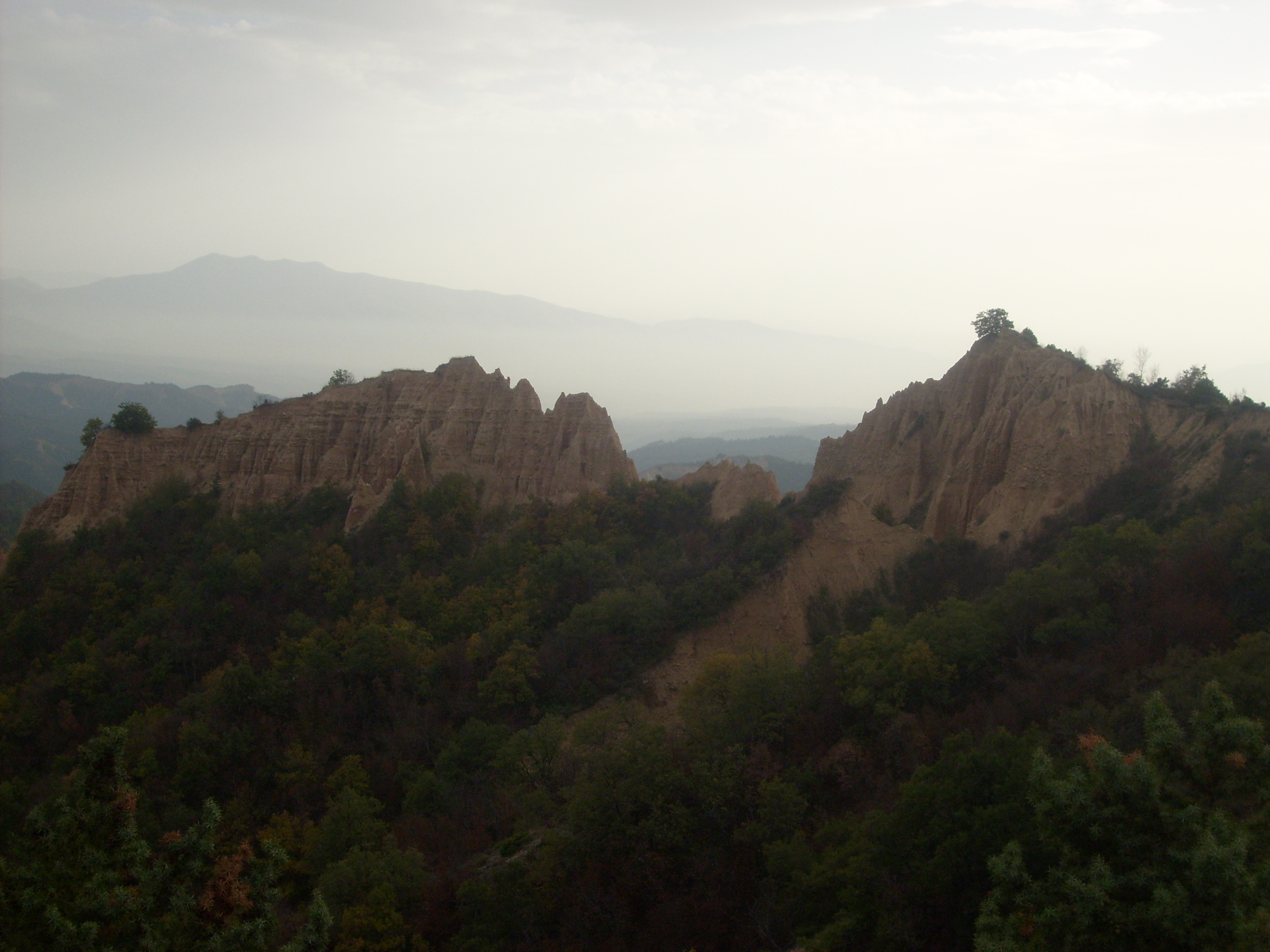

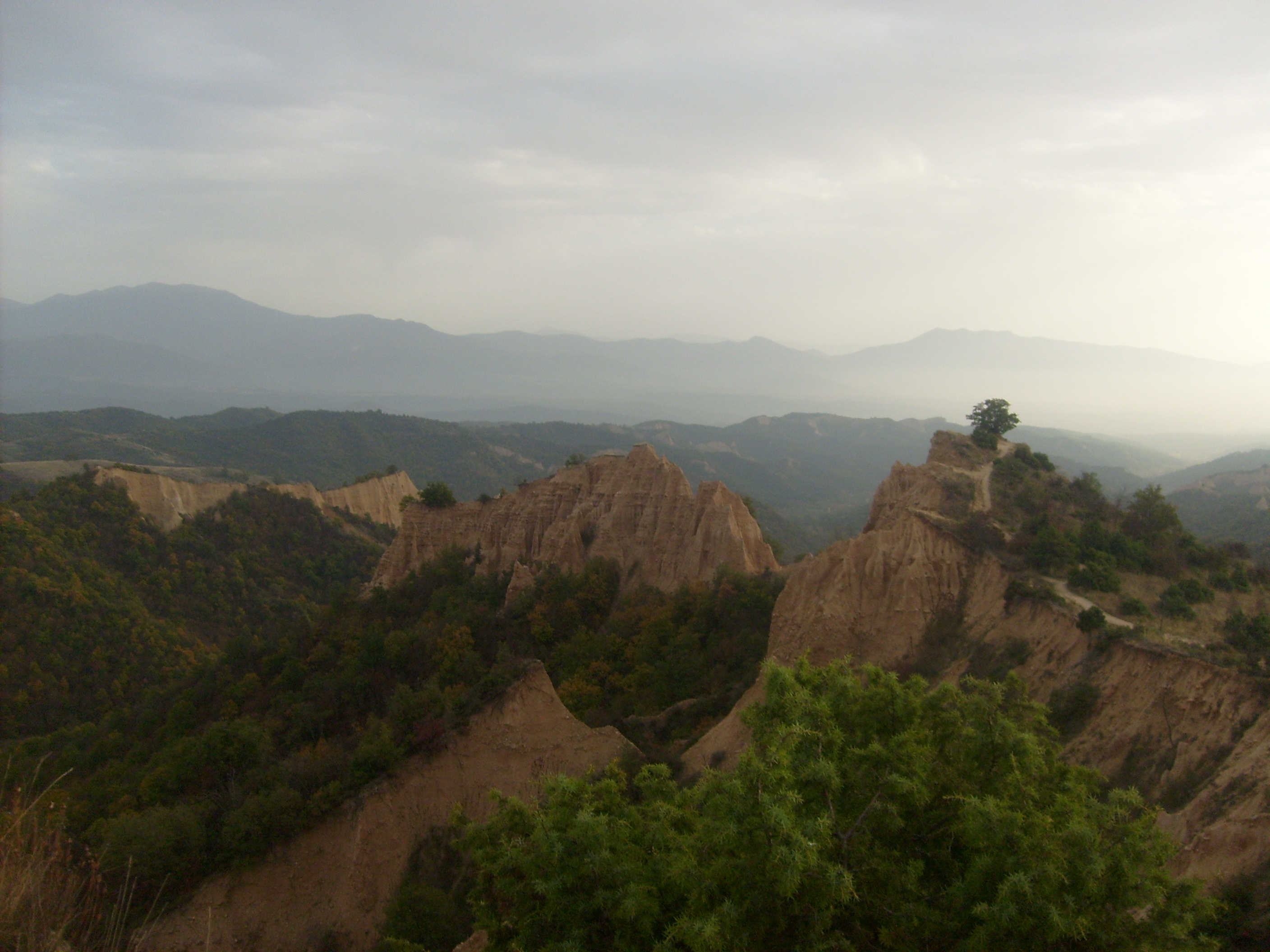

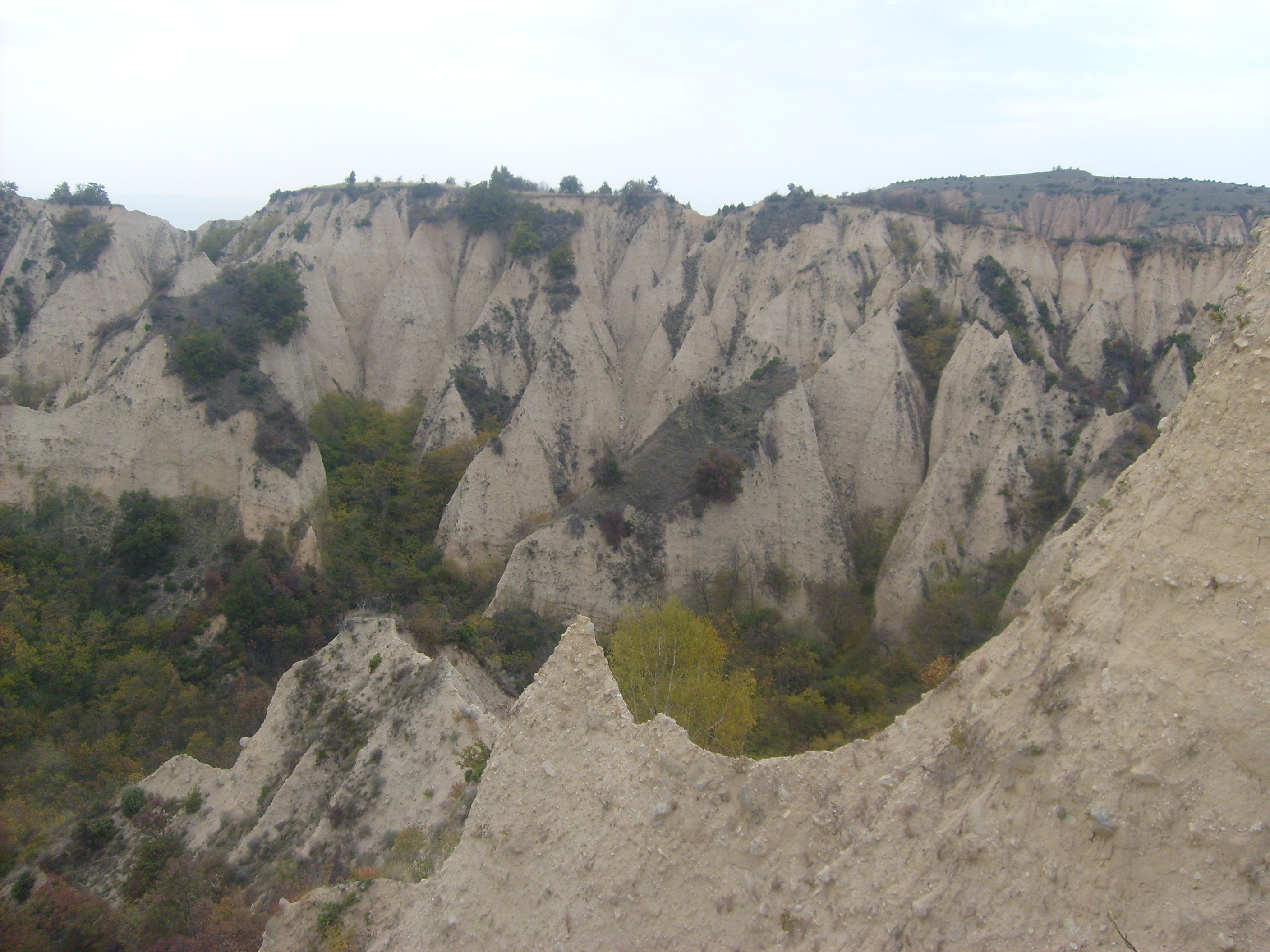

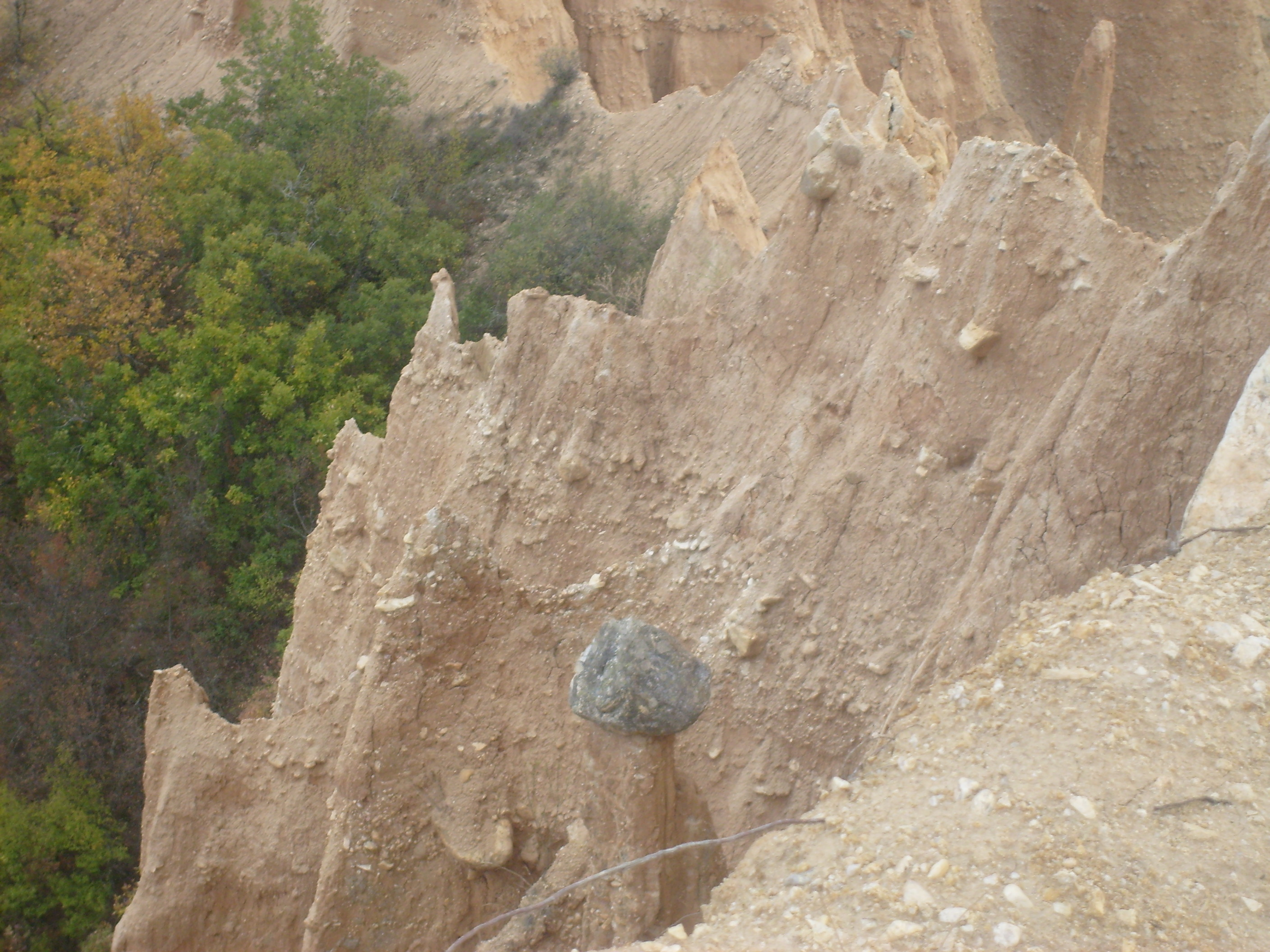

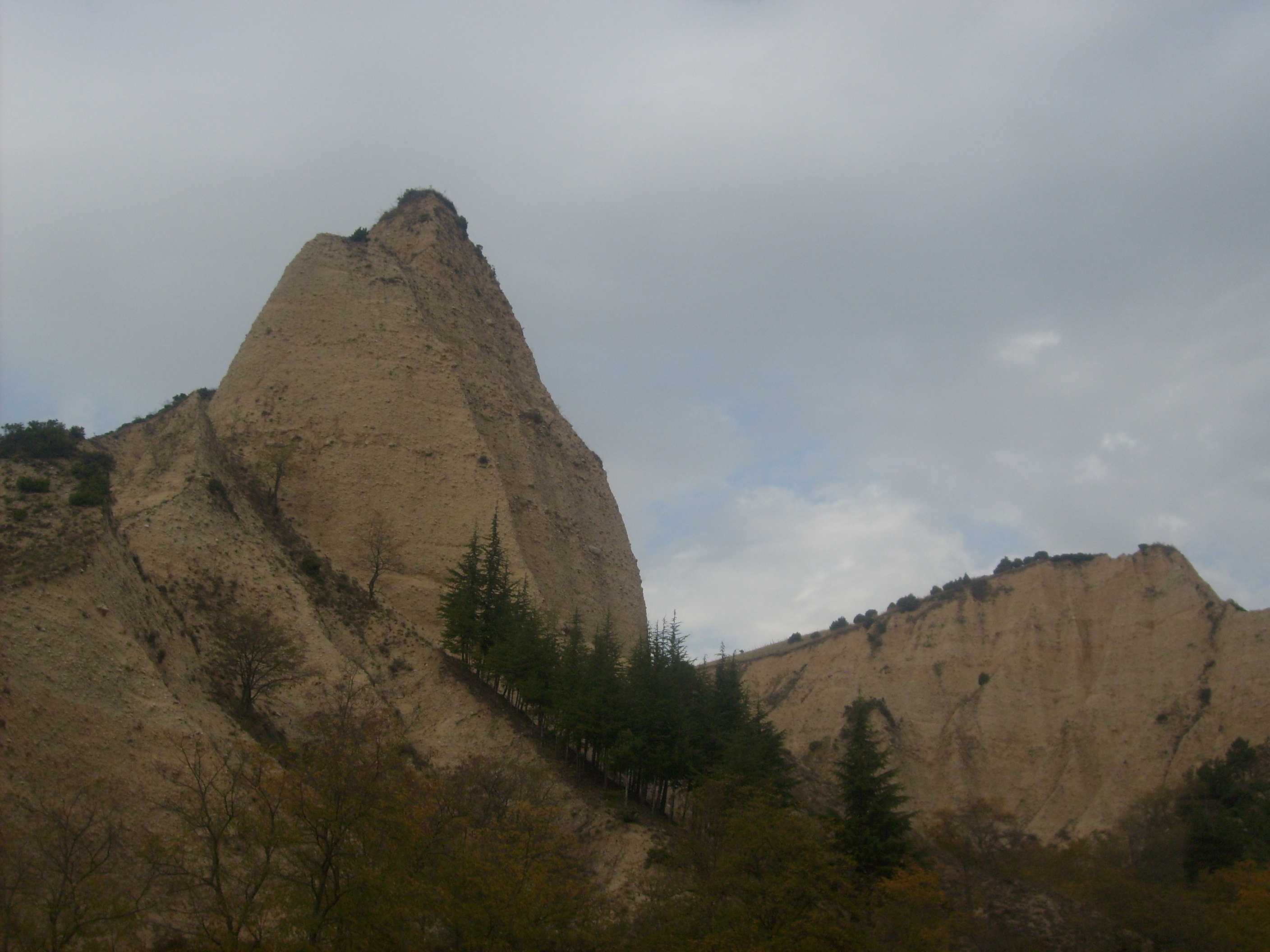

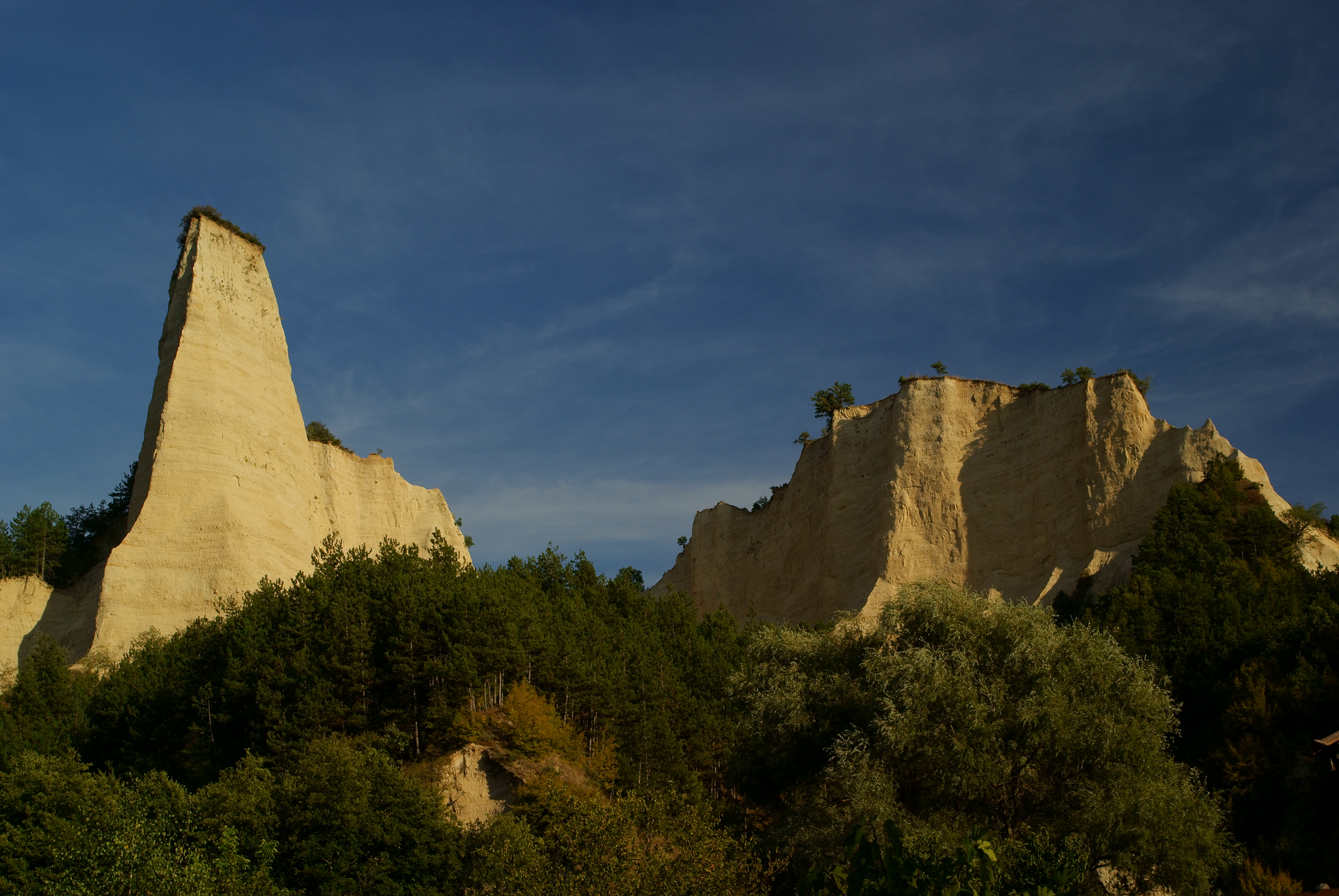
