= Internet in Bulgaria =

The Internet in Bulgaria began to offer full TCP/IP services in 1992, although e-mail, network news, and some other Internet services were available earlier, during the period from 1989 to 1991. The .bg top-level domain name was organized in 1991. Internet speeds and connection reliability in the capital, Sofia, are consistently ranked among the fastest in the world by several independent studies.

== Facts and figures ==
- Top-level domains: .bg and .бг.
- Internet users:
  - 3.9 million users, 72nd in the world; 55.1% of the population, 74th in the world (2012);
  - 3.4 million users, 63rd in the world (2009);
  - 1.9 million users (2007).
- Fixed broadband: 1.2 million subscriptions, 52nd in the world; 17.6% of population, 53rd in the world (2012).
- Wireless broadband: 2.8 million, 55th in the world; 40.3% of the population, 41st in the world (2012).
- Internet hosts:
  - 976,277 hosts, 47th in the world (2012);
  - 513,470 (2008).
- IPv4: 4.2 million addresses allocated, 0.1% of the world total, 589.7 addresses per 1000 people, 51st in the world (2012).

== Access technologies ==
=== Local area networks (LANs) ===
Local area network (LAN) is the most common type of Internet access in Bulgaria. Over 60% of consumers use this type of access because of the high speeds and good service. The biggest Internet service providers (ISPs) offer fiber optic access, called fiber-to-the-building (FTTB). This type of Internet access supports a variety of services, which are offered by most ISPs: IPTV, VoIP, and Video on demand (VOD). The major ISPs have networks in the following cities: Sofia, Plovdiv, Burgas, Varna, Veliko Tarnovo, Lovech, Ruse and Blagoevgrad.

=== Digital subscriber lines (DSL) ===
Asymmetric digital subscriber line (ADSL) technology was introduced in Bulgaria after the privatisation of the state monopoly Bulgarian Telecommunications Company (BTC) in 2004. Since then, availability has greatly increased and as of February 2006 it was offered in 140 towns and villages around the country. With the liberalisation of the telecommunications market, it is expected that other companies currently offering broadband Internet by other means will begin offering ADSL. At the end of 2006 the service was available to customers in 208 towns and villages.

== Internet censorship and surveillance ==
There are no government restrictions on access to the Internet or reports that the government monitors e-mail or Internet chat rooms without appropriate legal authority.

The law provides for freedom of speech and press, and the government generally respects these rights. The penal code provides for one to four years' imprisonment for incitement to "hate speech." The law defines hate speech as speech that instigates hatred, discrimination, or violence based on race, ethnicity, nationality, religion, sexual orientation, marital or social status, or disability. Internet social networks have become increasingly popular with antisemitic groups. Web site administrators were deleting antisemitic comments under online media articles, but gradually stopped the practice.

The constitution and law prohibit arbitrary interference with privacy, family, home, or correspondence, and the government generally respects these provisions in practice. The security services can access electronic data with judicial permission when investigating cyber and serious crimes. However, NGOs criticise gaps in the law that allow the prosecution service to request such data directly from the service providers without court authorisation. There are no reports that the government attempts to collect personally identifiable information in connection with a person's peaceful expression of political, religious, or ideological opinions or beliefs.

== Web browsers ==
As of 2024, most used web browsers according to Statcounter were:

Web browser	Market share	Reference
Chrome	75%	
Safari	10%	
Firefox	5.1%	
Samsung Internet	3.2%	
Edge	3.1%	
Opera	1.4%	
Android	0.56%	
Instabridge	0.13%	
Yandex Browser	0.08%	
other	0.17%	

As of 2024, most used web browsers according to Cloudflare were:

Web browser	Market share	Reference
Chrome	73%	
Safari	9.7%	
Firefox	5.3%	
Edge	4.1%	
Samsung Internet	3.5%	
Opera	1.5%	
Huawei Browser	1.0%	
Brave	0.88%	
Yandex Browser	0.16%	
Mi Browser	0.13%	
DuckDuckGo Private Browser	0.09%	
Avast Secure Browser	0.08%	

== See also ==
- Internet Society – Bulgaria
- List of internet service providers in Bulgaria
