= Bulgaria =

Country in Southeastern Europe

Republic of Bulgaria Република България
- Flag Coat of arms
- Motto: Съединението прави силата Sŭedinenieto pravi silata ("Unity makes strength")
- Anthem: Мила Родино; Mila Rodino ("Dear Motherland")
- Location of Bulgaria (dark green) – in Europe (green & dark grey) – in the European Union (green) – [Legend]
- Capital and largest city: Sofia; 42°41′51″N 23°19′21″E
- Official languages: Bulgarian
- Official script: Cyrillic
- Ethnic groups (2021 census (Note: Excluding the categories "Cannot determine", "Don't want to answer", and "Unknown". See Demographics.)): 85.7% Bulgarians; 8.5% Turks; 4.5% Roma; 1.3% others
- Religion (2021 census): 64.7% Christianity; 62.7% Bulgarian Orthodoxy; 2.0% other Christian; 15.9% no religion; 9.8% Islam; 0.1% other; 9.5% unanswered
- Demonym: Bulgarian
- Government: Unitary parliamentary republic
  - President: Iliana Iotova
  - Vice President: Kiril Valchev
  - Prime Minister: Rumen Radev
  - Chairperson of the National Assembly: Mihaela Dotsova
- Legislature: National Assembly

Establishment history
  - 1st Bulgarian Empire: 681–1018
  - 2nd Bulgarian Empire: 1185–1396
  - Principality of Bulgaria: 3 March 1878
  - Independence from the Ottoman Empire: 5 October 1908
  - Monarchy abolished: 15 September 1946
  - Current state form: 15 November 1990

Area
  - Total: 110,993.6 km^{2} (42,854.9 sq mi) (103rd)
  - Water (%): 2.16

Population
  - December 2025 estimate: ▼6,423,207 (109th)
  - 2021 census: ▼6,519,789
  - Density: 58/km^{2} (150.2/sq mi) (154th)
- GDP (PPP): 2026 estimate
  - Total: ▲$284.116 billion (73rd)
  - Per capita: ▲$44,603 (57th)
- GDP (nominal): 2026 estimate
  - Total: ▲$146.507 billion (65th)
  - Per capita: ▲$23,000 (54th)
- Gini (2024): ▲38.4 medium inequality
- HDI (2023): ▲0.845 very high (55th)
- Currency: Euro (€) (EUR)
- Time zone: UTC+2 (EET)
  - Summer (DST): UTC+3 (EEST)
- Calling code: +359
- ISO 3166 code: BG
- Internet TLD: .bg; .бг

Bulgaria, (Note: /bʌlˈɡɛəriə, bʊl-/; Bulgarian: България, romanised: Bŭlgariya [bɐɫˈɡarijɐ]) officially the Republic of Bulgaria, (Note: Bulgarian: Република България, romanised: Republika Bŭlgariya, IPA: [rɛˈpublikɐ bɐɫˈɡarijɐ]) is a country in Southeastern Europe. It is situated on the eastern portion of the Balkans directly south of the Danube river and west of the Black Sea. Bulgaria is bordered by Greece and Turkey to the south, Serbia and North Macedonia to the west, and Romania across the Danube river to the north. It covers a territory of 110,994 square kilometres (42,855 sq mi), making it the tenth largest within the European Union and the sixteenth-largest country in Europe by area. Sofia is the nation's capital and largest city; other major cities include Plovdiv, Varna, and Burgas.

One of the earliest societies in the lands of modern-day Bulgaria was the Karanovo culture (6,500 BC). In the 6th to 3rd century BC, the region was a battleground for ancient Thracians, Persians, Celts, and Macedonians; stability came when the Roman Empire conquered the region in AD 45. After the Roman state splintered, tribal invasions in the region resumed. Around the 6th century, these territories were settled by the early Slavs. The Bulgars, led by Asparuh, attacked from the lands of Old Great Bulgaria and then permanently invaded the Balkans in the late 7th century. They established the First Bulgarian Empire, recognised by treaty in 681 AD by the Byzantine Empire. It dominated most of the Balkans and significantly influenced Slavic cultures by developing the Cyrillic script. The First Bulgarian Empire lasted until the early 11th century, when Byzantine emperor Basil II conquered and dismantled it. A successful Bulgarian revolt in 1185 established a Second Bulgarian Empire, which reached its apex under Ivan Asen II (1218–1241). After numerous exhausting wars and feudal strife, the empire disintegrated and in 1396 fell under Ottoman rule for nearly five centuries.

The Russo-Turkish War of 1877–78 resulted in the formation of the third and current Bulgarian state, which declared independence from the Ottoman Empire in 1908. Many ethnic Bulgarians were left outside the new nation's borders, which stoked irredentist sentiments that led to several conflicts with its neighbours and alliances with Germany in both world wars. In 1946, Bulgaria came under the Soviet-led Eastern Bloc and became a socialist state. The ruling Communist Party gave up its monopoly on power after the revolutions of 1989 and allowed multiparty elections. Bulgaria then transitioned into a democracy.

Since adopting a democratic constitution in 1991, Bulgaria has been a parliamentary republic composed of 28 provinces, with a high degree of political, administrative, and economic centralisation. A developed country, its advanced, high-income economy is part of the European single market and is largely based on services, followed by manufacturing, mining, and agriculture. Bulgaria has been influenced by its role as a transit country for natural gas and oil pipelines, as well as its strategic location on the Black Sea. Bulgaria is a member state of the European Union, including the Schengen Area and the eurozone, NATO, and various regional suborganizations such as the Bucharest Nine.

== Etymology ==
The name Bulgaria is derived from the Bulgars, a tribe of Turkic origin that founded the First Bulgarian Empire. Their name is not completely understood and is difficult to trace back earlier than the 4th century AD; however, it is possibly derived from the Proto-Turkic word bulģha ("to mix", "shake", "stir") and its derivative bulgak ("revolt", "disorder"). The meaning may be further extended to "rebel", "incite" or "produce a state of disorder", and so, in the derivative, the "disturbers". Tribal groups in Inner Asia with phonologically close names were frequently described in similar terms, as in the case of the Buluoji, a component of the "Five Barbarian" groups, which during the 4th century were portrayed as both a "mixed race" and "troublemakers".

== History ==
=== Prehistory and Antiquity ===
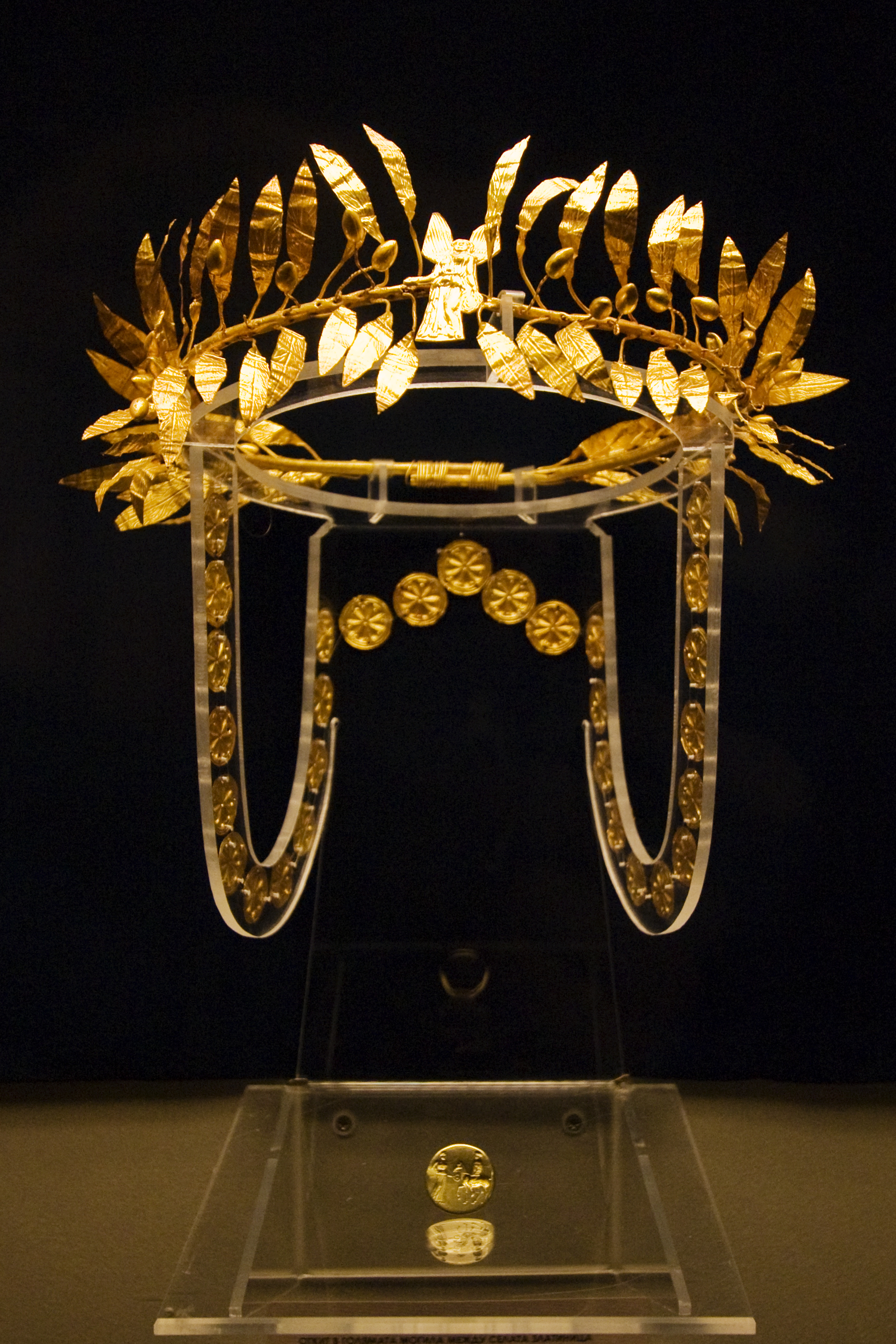
Odrysian golden wreath in the National History Museum

Neanderthal remains dating to around 150,000 years ago, or the Middle Paleolithic, are some of the earliest traces of human activity in the lands of modern Bulgaria. Remains of Homo sapiens dated c. 47,000 years BP found in the Bacho Kiro cave indicate the earliest arrival of modern humans in Europe. The Karanovo culture arose c. 6,500 BC and was one of several Neolithic societies in the region that thrived on agriculture. The invention of goldworking is credited to the Varna culture, which produced the oldest golden jewellery in the world with an approximate age of over 6,000 years. This treasure has contributed to the understanding of social hierarchy and stratification in Europe's earliest societies.

Some time before the 12th century BC, the Thracians, one of the three primary ancestral groups of modern Bulgarians, appeared on the Balkan Peninsula. The Thracians were tribal and stateless, but nevertheless excelled in metallurgy and gave the Greeks the Orphean and Dionysian cults. Thracian unity was catalysed by the Persian invasions of present-day Bulgarian territories that began in the 6th century BC. Following the defeat of the second Persian invasion in 479 BC, most of the Thracian tribes united under king Teres to form the Odrysian kingdom. It was weakened and vassalised by Philip II of Macedon in 341 BC, attacked by Celts in the 3rd century, and finally became a province of the Roman Empire in AD 45.

Roman governance over the entire Balkan Peninsula was established by the end of the 1st century AD. Christianity began spreading in the region around the 4th century; within this current, Gothic bishop Ulfilas created the Gothic Bible—the first Germanic language book—in what is today northern Bulgaria around 381. The Byzantines inherited the Balkan region following the fall of Rome in 476, but their prolonged military campaigns against Persia left these territories vulnerable to barbarian incursions. This allowed the Slavs to enter the Balkan Peninsula and gradually turn its interior into a country of the South Slavs, who lived under a democracy. The partially Hellenised, Romanised, and Gothicised Thracians were subsequently assimilated by the newcomers.

=== First Bulgarian Empire ===
Not long after the Slavic incursion, the region was once again invaded, this time by the Bulgars under Khan Asparukh. Their horde was a remnant of Old Great Bulgaria, an extinct tribal confederacy situated north of the Black Sea in what is now Ukraine and southern Russia. Asparukh attacked Byzantine territories in Moesia and conquered the Slavic tribes there in 680. A peace treaty with the Byzantine Empire was signed in 681, marking the foundation of the First Bulgarian Empire. The Bulgars formed a close-knit ruling minority caste.

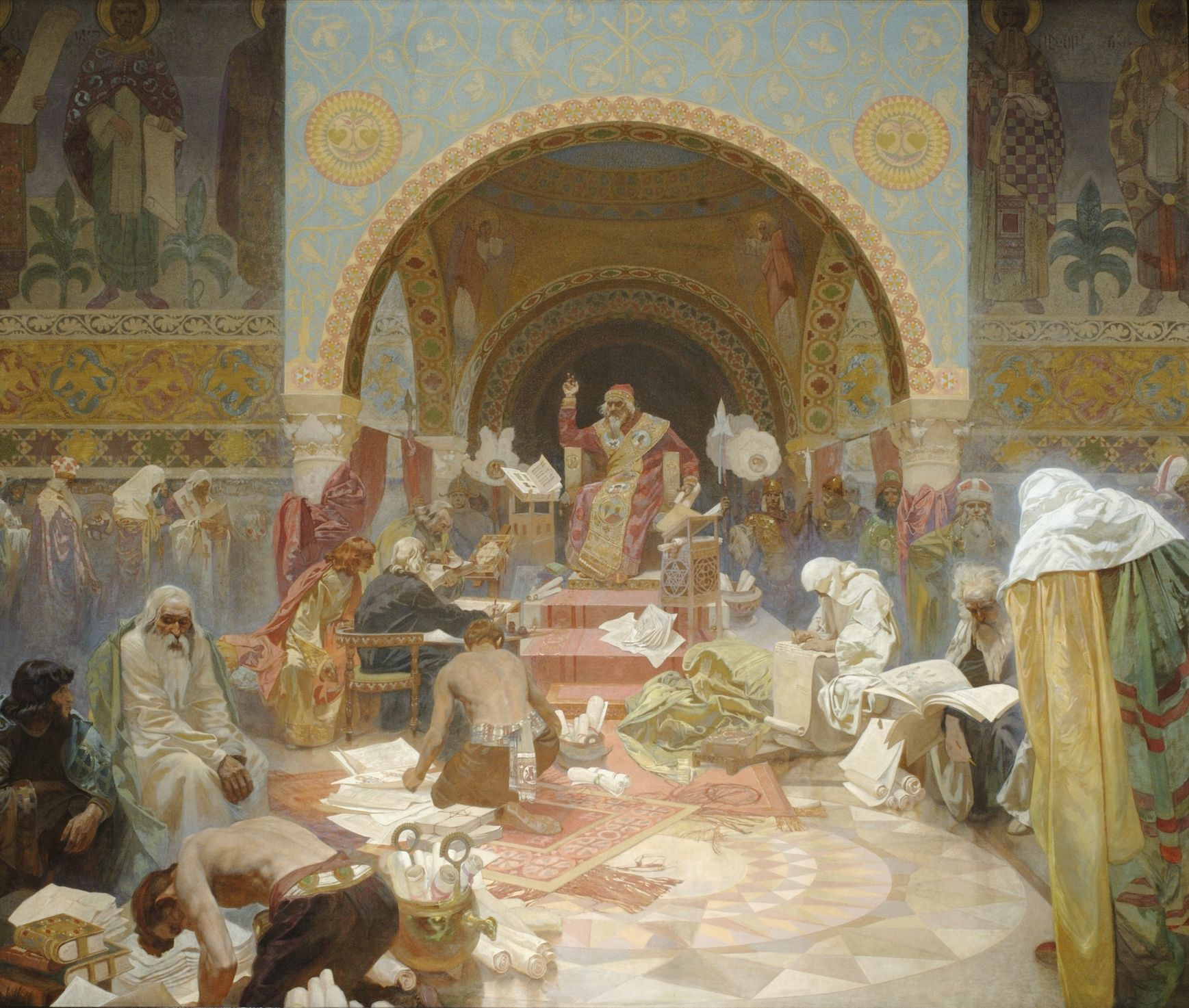
Emperor Simeon I: The Morning Star of Slavonic Literature, The Slav Epic cycle by Alfons Mucha

Succeeding rulers strengthened the Bulgarian state throughout the 8th and 9th centuries. Krum introduced a written code of law and checked a major Byzantine invasion at the Battle of Pliska, where Byzantine emperor Nicephorus I was killed. Boris I abolished Bulgar paganism in favour of Eastern Orthodox Christianity in 864. The conversion was followed by a Byzantine recognition of the Bulgarian church and the adoption of the Cyrillic alphabet, developed in the capital Preslav. The common language, religion and script strengthened central authority and gradually fused the Slavs and Bulgars into a unified people speaking a single Slavic language. A golden age began during the 34-year rule of Simeon the Great, who oversaw the largest territorial expansion of the state. Literature produced in Old Bulgarian soon spread north throughout Eastern Europe, the language itself becoming a lingua franca of the region. These political, cultural and religious advances turned Bulgaria into one of the great medieval powers in Europe at that time, alongside the Byzantine Empire and the Frankish realm.

After Simeon's death in 927, the empire was weakened by wars with Magyars and Pechenegs and the spread of Bogomil heresy. Simeon's successor Peter I faced revolts by two of his three brothers, but both were quelled. His reign stabilised the empire through a favourable peace treaty with the Byzantines, reinforced with a marriage between Peter and Byzantine emperor Romanos' granddaughter. The agreement ushered in a period of 40 years of peaceful relations between the two powers and domestic prosperity. This lasted until 965, when war with Byzantium broke out once more; Peter suffered a stroke and retired to a monastery, dying in 969.

Preslav was seized by the Byzantine army in 971 after consecutive Rus' and Byzantine invasions. The empire briefly recovered from the attacks under Samuil, but this ended when Byzantine emperor Basil II defeated the Bulgarian army at Klyuch in 1014. Samuil died shortly after the battle, and by 1018 the Byzantines had conquered the First Bulgarian Empire. Basil II prevented revolts by retaining the rule of local nobility, integrating them in Byzantine bureaucracy and aristocracy, and relieving their lands of the obligation to pay taxes in gold, allowing tax in kind instead. The Bulgarian Patriarchate was reduced to an archbishopric, but retained its autocephalous status and its dioceses.

=== Second Bulgarian Empire ===
A map showing the greatest territorial extension of the Second Bulgarian Empire during the reign of Ivan Asen II (1218–1241)

Following the death of Basil II in 1025, Byzantine domestic policy shifted from centralized, militaristic consolidation to a fragile, civilian-led administration that neglected provincial defences, directly triggering massive unrest—most notably the uprising of Peter Delyan (1040–41)—as alienated Bulgarian subjects and disgruntled military elites rebelled against crushing taxation and bureaucratic mismanagement. The empire's authority declined after a catastrophic military defeat at Manzikert against Seljuk invaders, and was further disturbed by the Crusades. This upended Byzantine Hellenisation attempts and created fertile ground for further revolt. Asen dynasty nobles Ivan Asen I and Peter IV used the opportunity to organise a major uprising and succeeded in re-establishing the Bulgarian state with a new capital in Tarnovo.

Kaloyan, the third of the Asen monarchs, extended his dominion to Belgrade and Ohrid. He acknowledged the spiritual supremacy of the pope and received a royal crown from a papal legate. The empire reached its zenith under Ivan Asen II (1218–1241), when its borders expanded as far as the coast of Albania, Serbia and Epirus, while commerce and culture flourished. Ivan Asen's rule was also marked by a shift away from Rome in religious matters.

The Asen dynasty became extinct in 1257. Internal strife and incessant Byzantine, Hungarian and Mongol attacks followed, allowing the Golden Horde to establish suzerainty over the weakened Bulgarian state. The Mongols were expelled by swineherd Ivaylo, who led a great peasant revolt that briefly made him emperor in 1277. His short-lived reign ended in 1280 when he was overthrown by the feudal landlords, whose subsequent factional conflicts caused the Second Bulgarian Empire to disintegrate into small feudal dominions by the 14th century. Despite a brief resurgence in the arts and culture, the remaining Bulgarian rump states—two tsardoms at Vidin and Tarnovo and the Despotate of Dobrudzha—became easy prey for a new threat arriving from the Southeast: the Ottoman Turks.

=== Ottoman rule ===
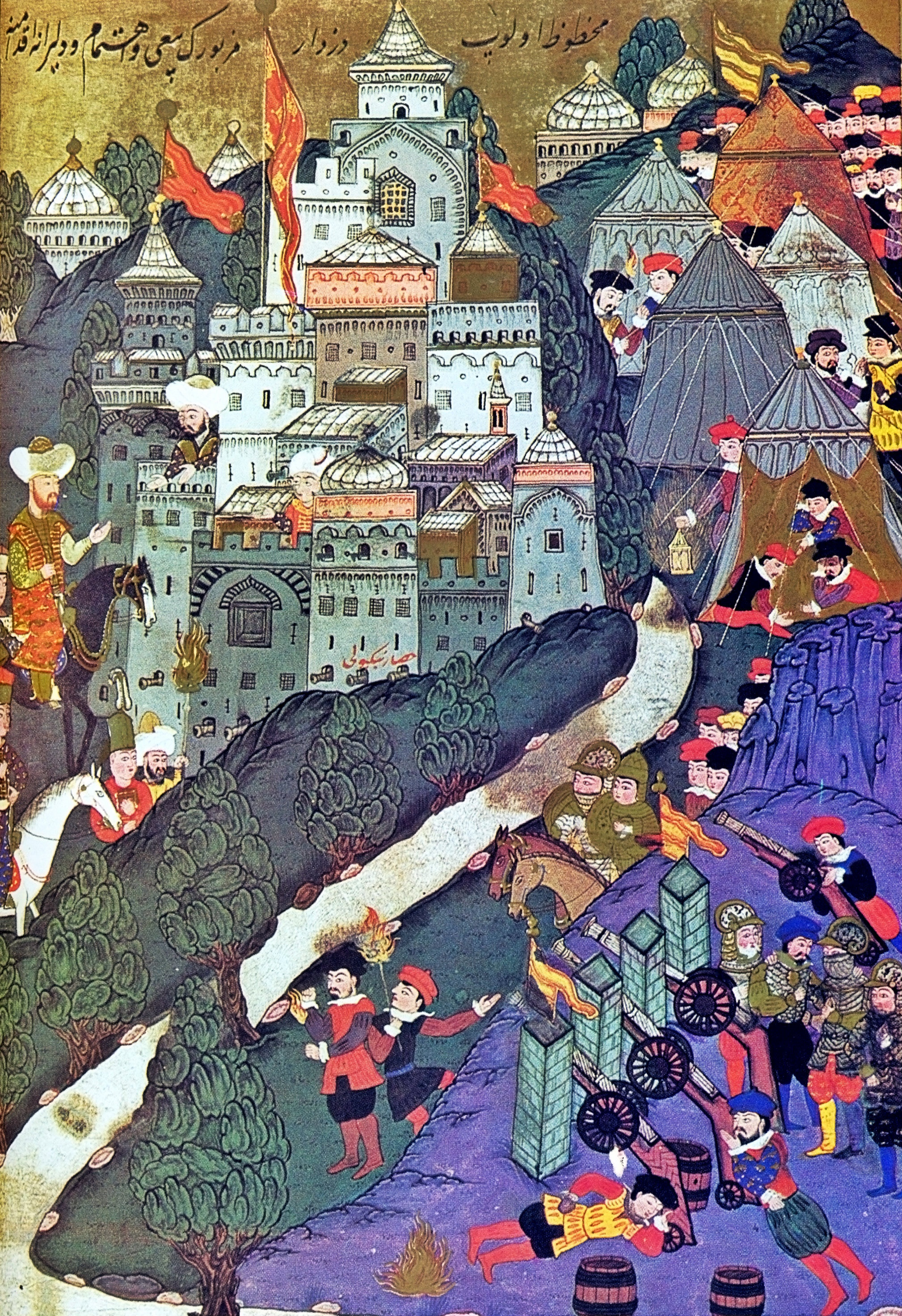
The Battle of Nicopolis in 1396 marked the end of medieval Bulgarian statehood.

The Ottomans were employed as mercenaries by the Byzantines in the 1340s, but later became invaders in their own right. Sultan Murad I took Adrianople from the Byzantines in 1362; Sofia fell in 1382, followed by Shumen in 1388. The Ottomans completed their conquest of Bulgarian lands in 1393 when Tarnovo was sacked after a three-month siege and the Battle of Nicopolis which brought about the fall of the Vidin Tsardom in 1396. Sozopol was the last Bulgarian settlement to fall, in 1453. The Bulgarian nobility was subsequently eliminated and the peasantry was enserfed to Ottoman masters, while much of the educated clergy fled to other countries.

Bulgarians were subjected to heavy taxes (including Devshirme, or blood tax), their culture was suppressed, and they experienced partial Islamisation. Ottoman authorities established a religious administrative community called the Rum Millet, which governed all Orthodox Christians regardless of their ethnicity. Most of the local population then gradually lost its distinct national consciousness, identifying only by its faith. The clergy remaining in some isolated monasteries kept their ethnic identity alive, enabling its survival in remote rural areas, and in the militant Catholic community in the northwest of the country.

As Ottoman power began to wane, Habsburg Austria and Russia saw Bulgarian Christians as potential allies. The Austrians first backed an uprising in Tarnovo in 1598, then a second one in 1686, the Chiprovtsi Uprising in 1688 and finally Karposh's rebellion in 1689. The Russian Empire also asserted itself as a protector of Christians in Ottoman lands with the Treaty of Küçük Kaynarca in 1774.

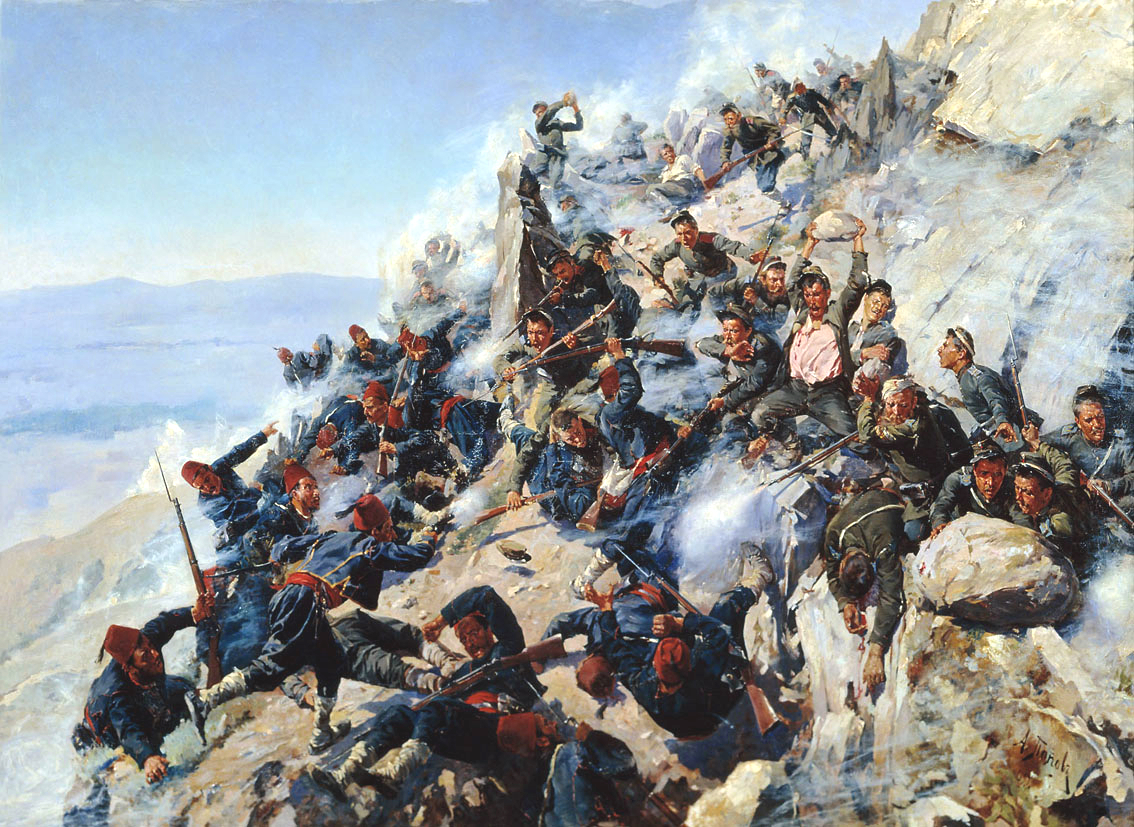
The Russo-Bulgarian defence of Shipka Pass in 1877

The Western European Enlightenment in the 18th century influenced the initiation of a national awakening of Bulgaria. It restored national consciousness and provided an ideological basis for the liberation struggle, resulting in the April Uprising of 1876. Up to 30,000 Bulgarians were killed as Ottoman authorities put down the rebellion. The massacres prompted the Great Powers to take action. They convened the Constantinople Conference in 1876, but their decisions were rejected by the Ottomans. This allowed the Russian Empire to seek a military solution without risking confrontation with other Great Powers, as had happened in the Crimean War. In 1877, Russia declared war on the Ottomans and defeated them with the help of Bulgarian rebels, particularly during the crucial Battle of Shipka Pass which secured Russian control over the main road to Constantinople.

=== Third Bulgarian state ===
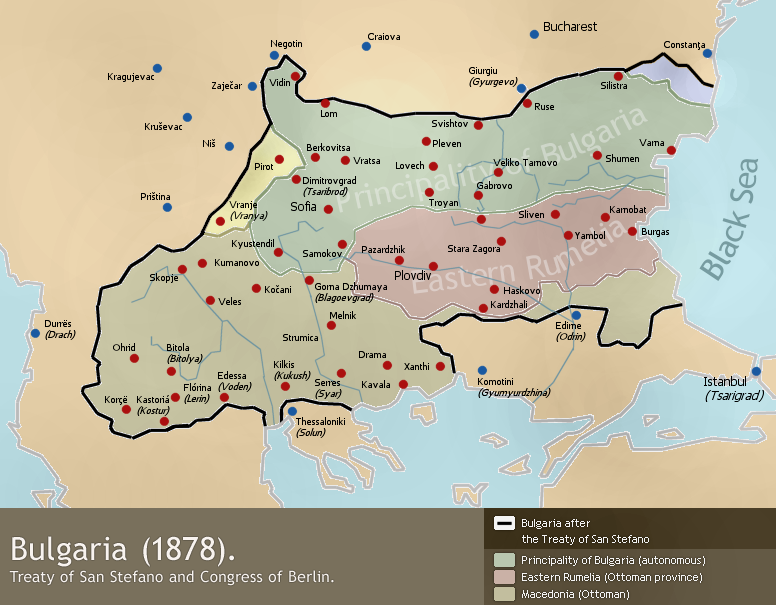
Borders of Bulgaria according to the preliminary Treaty of San Stefano

The Treaty of San Stefano was signed on 3 March 1878 by Russia and the Ottoman Empire. It was to set up an autonomous Bulgarian principality spanning Moesia, Macedonia and Thrace, roughly on the territories of the Second Bulgarian Empire, and this day is now a public holiday called National Liberation Day. The other Great Powers immediately rejected the treaty out of fear that such a large country in the Balkans might threaten their interests. It was superseded by the Treaty of Berlin, signed on 13 July. It provided for a much smaller state, the Principality of Bulgaria, only comprising Moesia and the region of Sofia, and leaving large populations of ethnic Bulgarians outside the new country. This significantly contributed to Bulgaria's militaristic foreign affairs approach during the first half of the 20th century.

The Bulgarian principality won a war against Serbia and incorporated the semi-autonomous Ottoman territory of Eastern Rumelia in 1885, proclaiming itself the independent Kingdom of Bulgaria on 5 October 1908. In the years following independence, Bulgaria increasingly militarised and was often referred to as "the Balkan Prussia". It became involved in three consecutive conflicts between 1912 and 1918—two Balkan Wars and World War I. After a disastrous defeat in the Second Balkan War, Bulgaria again found itself fighting on the losing side as a result of its alliance with the Central Powers in World War I. Despite fielding more than a quarter of its population in a 1,200,000-strong army and achieving several decisive victories at Doiran and Monastir, the country capitulated in 1918. The war resulted in significant territorial losses and a total of 87,500 soldiers killed. More than 253,000 refugees from the lost territories immigrated to Bulgaria from 1912 to 1929, placing additional strain on the already ruined national economy.

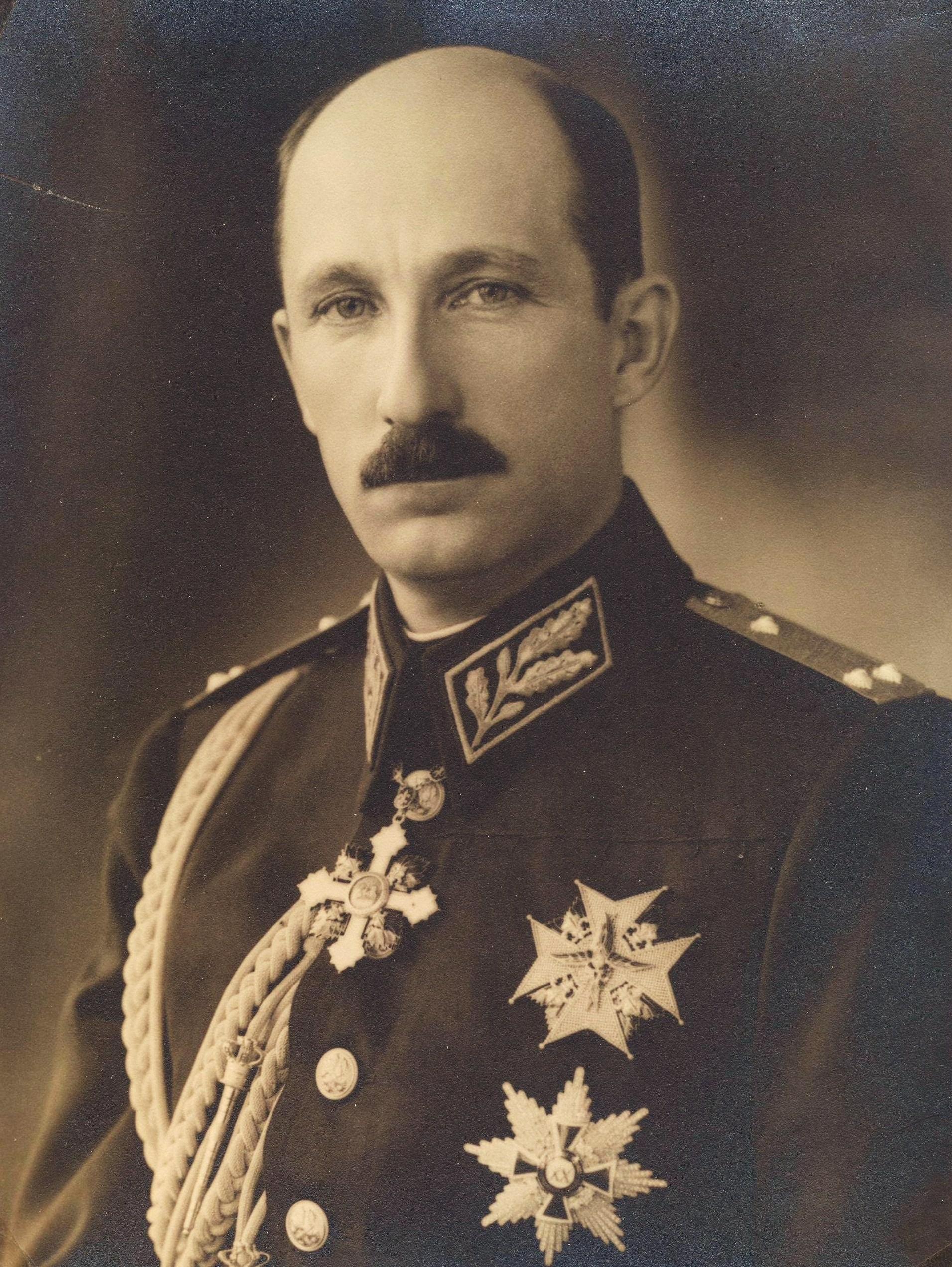
Tsar Boris III

The resulting political unrest led to the establishment of a royal authoritarian dictatorship by Tsar Boris III (1918–1943). Bulgaria entered World War II in 1941 as a member of the Axis but declined to participate in Operation Barbarossa and saved its Jewish population from deportation to concentration camps. The sudden death of Boris III in mid-1943 pushed the country into political turmoil as the war turned against Germany, and the communist guerrilla movement gained momentum. The government of Bogdan Filov subsequently failed to achieve peace with the Allies. Bulgaria did not comply with Soviet demands to expel German forces from its territory, resulting in a declaration of war and an invasion by the USSR in September 1944. The communist-dominated Fatherland Front took power, ended participation in the Axis and joined the Allied side until the war ended. Bulgaria suffered little war damage and the Soviet Union demanded no reparations; however, all wartime territorial gains, with the notable exception of Southern Dobrudzha, were lost.

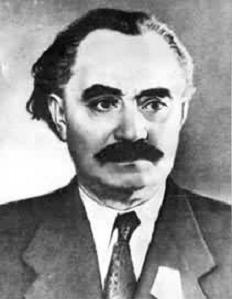
Georgi Dimitrov, leader of the Bulgarian Communist Party from 1946 to 1949

The left-wing coup d'état of 9 September 1944 led to the abolition of the monarchy and the executions of some 1,000–3,000 dissidents, war criminals, and members of the former royal elite. But it was not until 1946 that a one-party people's republic was instituted following a referendum. It fell into the Soviet sphere of influence under the leadership of Georgi Dimitrov (1946–1949), who established a repressive, rapidly industrialising Stalinist state. By the mid-1950s, standards of living rose significantly and political repression eased. The Soviet-style planned economy saw some experimental market-oriented policies emerging under Todor Zhivkov (1954–1989). Compared to wartime levels, national GDP increased five-fold and per capita GDP quadrupled by the 1980s, although severe debt spikes took place in 1960, 1977 and 1980. Zhivkov's daughter Lyudmila bolstered national pride by promoting Bulgarian heritage, culture and arts worldwide. Facing declining birth rates among the ethnic Bulgarian majority, Zhivkov's government in 1984 forced the minority ethnic Turks to adopt Slavic names in an attempt to erase their identity and assimilate them. These policies resulted in the emigration of some 300,000 ethnic Turks to Turkey.

The Communist Party was forced to give up its political monopoly on 10 November 1989 under the influence of the Revolutions of 1989. Zhivkov resigned and Bulgaria embarked on a transition to a parliamentary democracy. The first free elections in June 1990 were won by the Communist Party, now rebranded as the Bulgarian Socialist Party. A new constitution that provided for a relatively weak elected president and for a prime minister accountable to the legislature was adopted in July 1991. The new system initially failed to improve living standards or create economic growth—the average quality of life and economic performance remained lower than under communism well into the early 2000s. After 2001, economic, political and geopolitical conditions improved greatly, and Bulgaria achieved high Human Development status in 2003. It became a member of NATO in 2004 and participated in the War in Afghanistan. After several years of reforms, it joined the European Union and the single market in 2007, despite EU concerns over government corruption. Bulgaria hosted the 2018 Presidency of the Council of the European Union at the National Palace of Culture in Sofia.

== Geography ==
Topographic map of Bulgaria

Bulgaria is a middle-sized country situated in Southeast Europe, in the east of the Balkans. Its territory covers an area of 110,994 square kilometres (42,855 sq mi), while land borders with its five neighbouring countries run a total length of 1,808 kilometres (1,123 mi), and its coastline is 354 kilometres (220 mi) long. Bulgaria's geographic coordinates are 43° N 25° E. The most notable topographical features of the country are the Danubian Plain, the Balkan Mountains, the Upper Thracian Plain, and the Rila-Rhodope massif. The southern edge of the Danubian Plain slopes upward into the foothills of the Balkans, while the Danube defines the border with Romania. The Thracian Plain is roughly triangular, beginning southeast of Sofia and broadening as it reaches the Black Sea coast.

The Balkan mountains run laterally through the middle of the country from west to east. The mountainous southwest has two distinct alpine type ranges—Rila and Pirin, which border the lower but more extensive Rhodope Mountains to the east, and various medium altitude mountains to west, northwest and south, like Vitosha, Osogovo and Belasitsa. Musala, at 2,925 metres (9,596 ft), is the highest point in both Bulgaria and the Balkans. The Black Sea coast is the country's lowest point. Plains occupy about one third of the territory, while plateaux and hills occupy 41%. Most rivers are short and with low water levels. The longest river located solely in Bulgarian territory, the Iskar, has a length of 368 kilometres (229 mi). The Struma and the Maritsa are two major rivers in the south.

=== Climate ===
Köppen climate types of Bulgaria

Bulgaria has a varied and changeable climate, which results from being positioned at the meeting point of the Mediterranean, Oceanic and Continental air masses combined with the barrier effect of its mountains. Northern Bulgaria averages 1 °C (1.8 °F) cooler, and registers 200 millimetres (7.9 in) more precipitation, than the regions south of the Balkan mountains. Temperature amplitudes vary significantly in different areas. The lowest recorded temperature is −38.3 °C (−36.9 °F), while the highest is 45.2 °C (113.4 °F). Precipitation averages about 630 millimetres (24.8 in) per year, and varies from 500 millimetres (19.7 in) in Dobrudja to more than 2,500 millimetres (98.4 in) in the mountains. Continental air masses bring significant amounts of snowfall during winter.

Considering its relatively small area, Bulgaria has variable and complex climate. The country occupies the southernmost part of the continental climatic zone, with small areas in the south falling within the Mediterranean climatic zone. The continental zone is predominant, because continental air masses flow easily into the unobstructed Danubian Plain. The continental influence, stronger during the winter, produces abundant snowfall; the Mediterranean influence increases during the second half of summer and produces hot and dry weather. Bulgaria is subdivided into five climatic zones: continental zone (Danubian Plain, Pre-Balkan and the higher valleys of the Transitional geomorphological region); transitional zone (Upper Thracian Plain, most of the Struma and Mesta valleys, the lower Sub-Balkan valleys); continental-Mediterranean zone (the southernmost areas of the Struma and Mesta valleys, the eastern Rhodope Mountains, Sakar and Strandzha); Black Sea zone along the coastline with an average length of 30–40 km (19–25 mi) inland; and alpine zone in the mountains above 1,000 m (3,300 ft) altitude (central Balkan Mountains, Rila, Pirin, Vitosha, western Rhodope Mountains, etc.).

=== Biodiversity and conservation ===
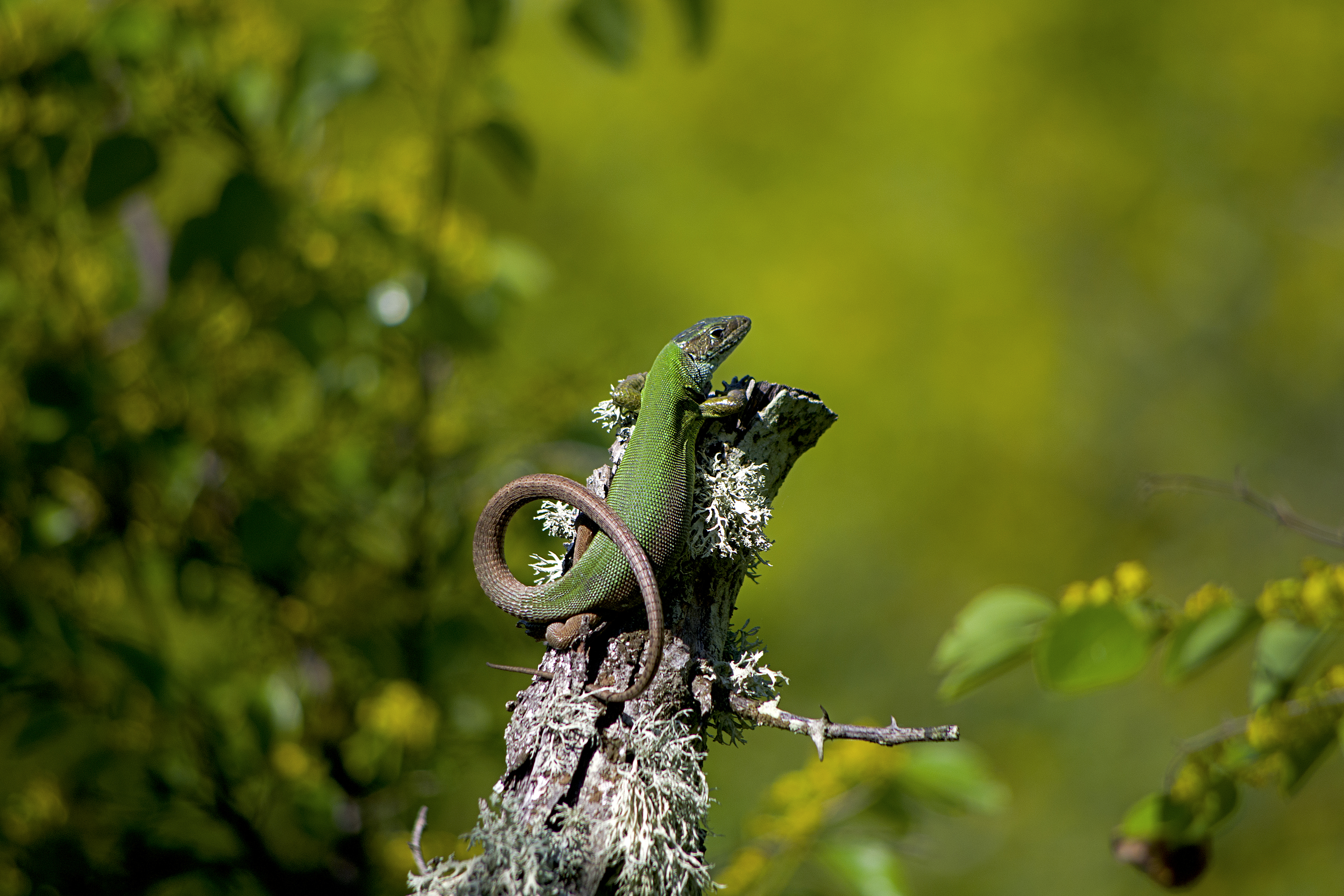
A European green lizard in Ropotamo nature reserve, one of Bulgaria's ten biosphere reserves

The interaction of climatic, hydrological, geological and topographical conditions has produced a relatively wide variety of plant and animal species. Bulgaria's biodiversity, one of the richest in Europe, is conserved in three national parks, 11 nature parks, 10 biosphere reserves and 565 protected areas. Ninety-three of the 233 mammal species of Europe are found in Bulgaria, along with 49% of butterfly and 30% of vascular plant species. Overall, 41,493 plant and animal species are present. Larger mammals with sizeable populations include deer (106,323 individuals), wild boar (88,948), golden jackal (47,293) and red fox (32,326). Partridges number some 328,000 individuals, making them the most widespread gamebird. A third of all nesting birds in Bulgaria can be found in Rila National Park, which also hosts Arctic and alpine species at high altitudes. Flora includes more than 3,800 vascular plant species of which 170 are endemic and 150 are considered endangered. A checklist of larger fungi in Bulgaria by the Institute of Botany identifies more than 1,500 species. In Bulgaria forest cover is around 36% of the total land area, equivalent to 3,893,000 hectares (ha) of forest in 2020, up from 3,327,000 hectares (ha) in 1990. In 2020, naturally regenerating forest covered 3,116,000 hectares (ha) and planted forest covered 777,000 hectares (ha). Of the naturally regenerating forest 18% was reported to be primary forest (consisting of native tree species with no clearly visible indications of human activity) and around 18% of the forest area was found within protected areas. For the year 2015, 88% of the forest area was reported to be under public ownership and 12% private ownership. In 1998, the Bulgarian government adopted the National Biological Diversity Conservation Strategy, a comprehensive programme seeking the preservation of local ecosystems, protection of endangered species and conservation of genetic resources. Bulgaria has some of the largest Natura 2000 areas in Europe covering 33.8% of its territory. It also achieved its Kyoto Protocol objective of reducing carbon dioxide emissions by 30% from 1990 to 2009.

Bulgaria ranks 37th in the 2024 Environmental Performance Index, but scores low on air quality. Particulate levels are the highest in Europe, especially in urban areas affected by automobile traffic and coal-based power stations. One of these, the lignite-fired Maritsa Iztok-2 station, is causing the highest damage to health and the environment in the European Union. Pesticide use in agriculture and antiquated industrial sewage systems produce extensive soil and water pollution. Water quality began to improve in 1998 and has maintained a trend of moderate improvement. Over 75% of surface rivers meet European standards for good quality.

== Politics ==
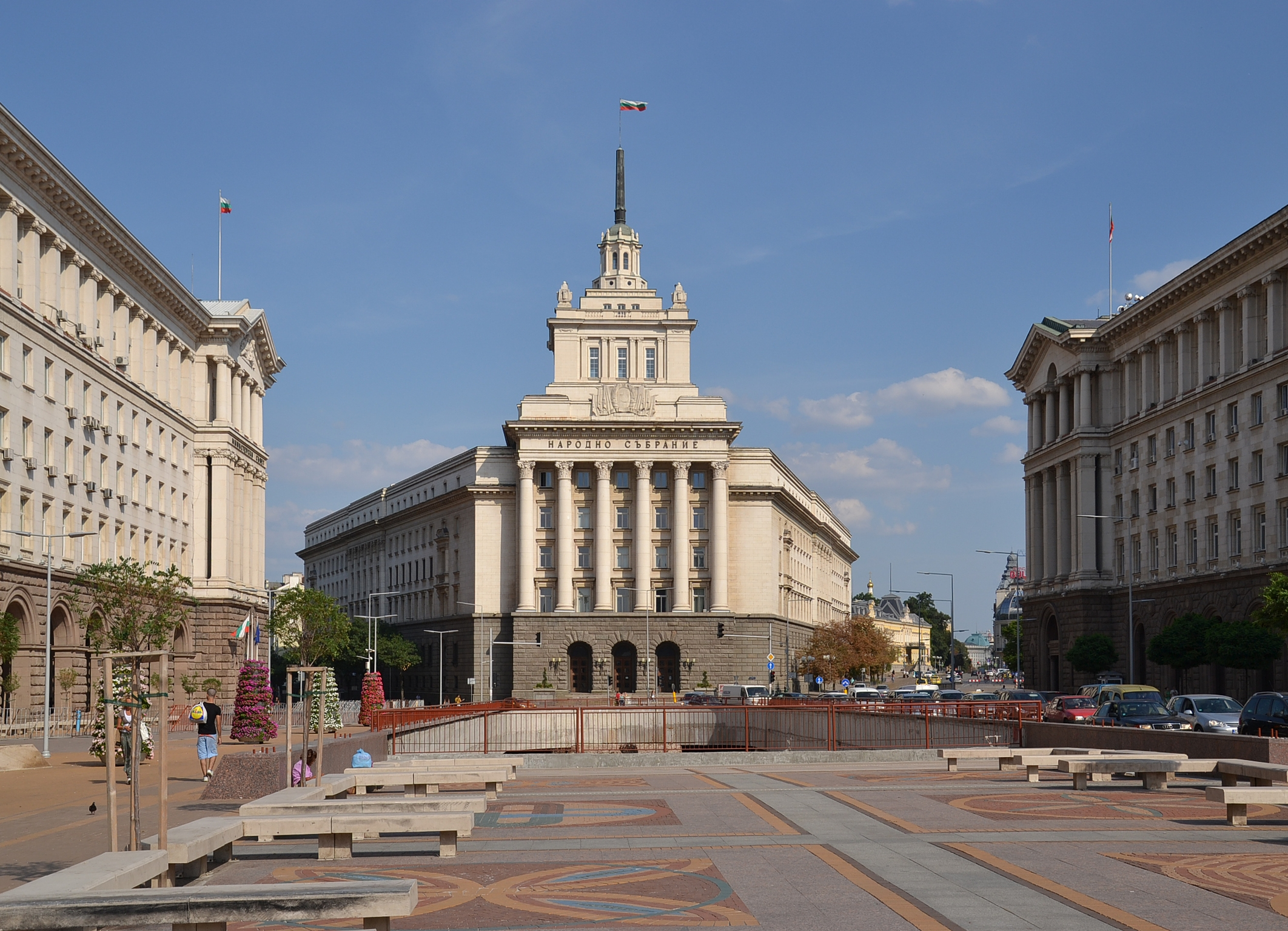
Independence Square in Sofia: The headquarters of the Presidency (right), the National Assembly (centre) and the Council of Ministers (left).

Bulgaria is a parliamentary democracy where the prime minister is the head of government and the most powerful executive position. The political system has three branches—legislative, executive and judicial, with universal suffrage for citizens at least 18 years old. The Constitution also provides possibilities of direct democracy, namely petitions and national referendums. Elections are supervised by an independent Central Election Commission that includes members from all major political parties. Parties must register with the commission prior to participating in a national election. Normally, the prime minister-elect is the leader of the party receiving the most votes in parliamentary elections, although this is not always the case.

Unlike the prime minister, presidential domestic power is more limited. The directly elected president serves as head of state and commander-in-chief of the armed forces, and has the authority to return a bill for further debate, although the parliament can override the presidential veto by a simple majority vote. Political parties gather in the National Assembly, a body of 240 deputies elected to four-year terms by direct popular vote. The National Assembly has the power to enact laws, approve the budget, schedule presidential elections, select and dismiss the prime minister and other ministers, declare war, deploy troops abroad, and ratify international treaties and agreements.

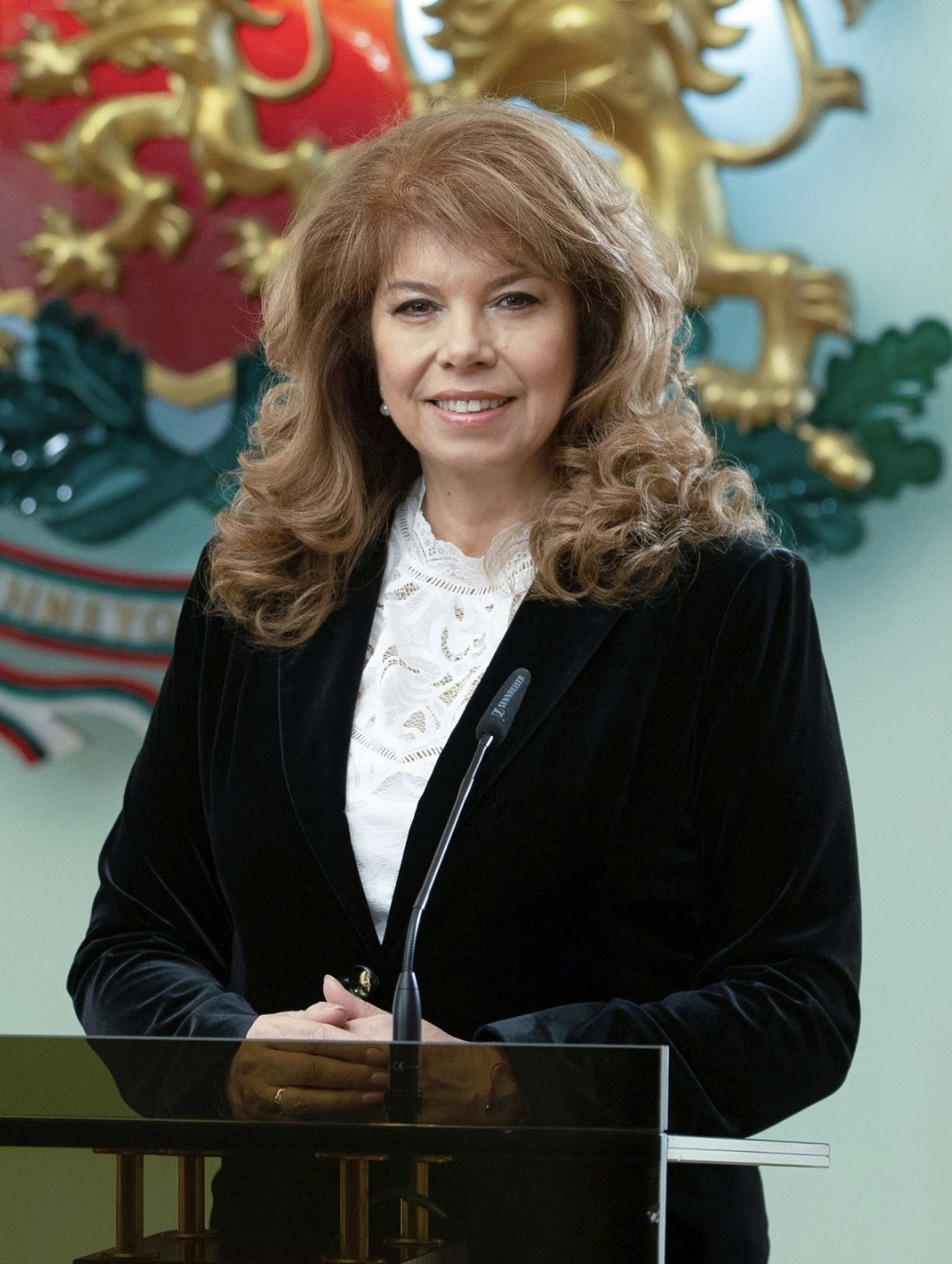
Iliana Iotova
President

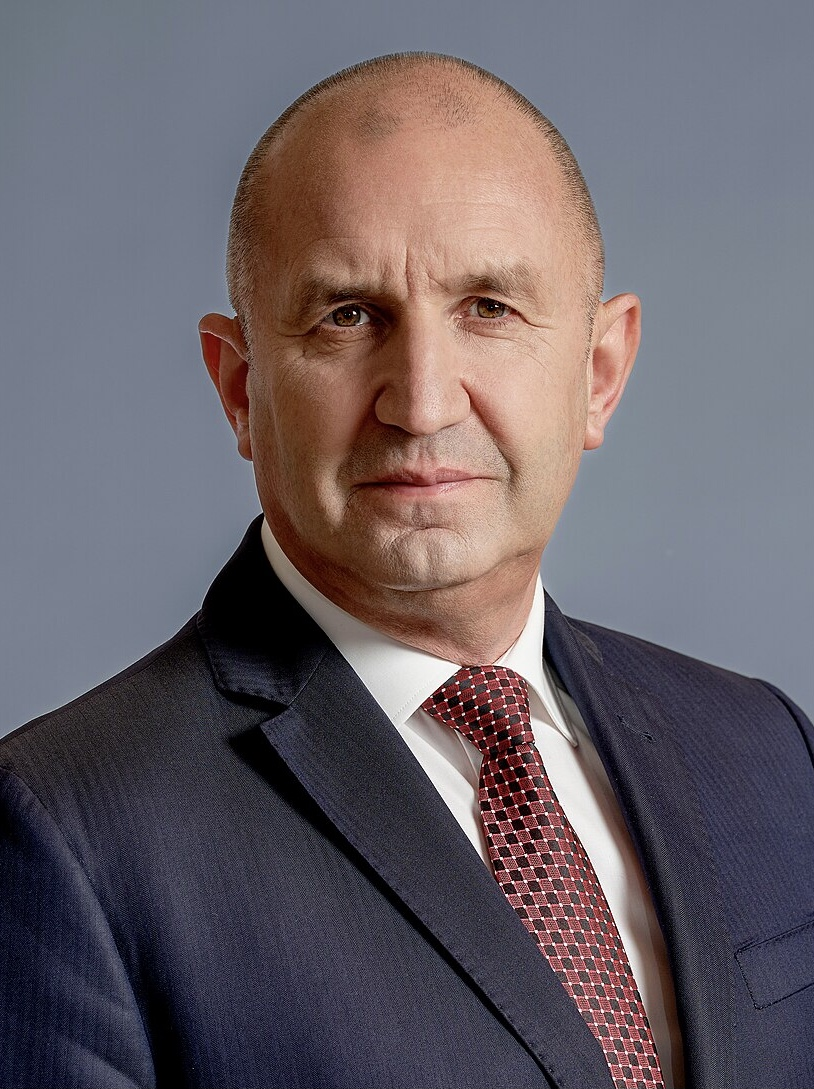
Rumen Radev
Prime Minister

Overall, Bulgaria displays a pattern of unstable governments. Boyko Borisov, the leader of the centre-right, pro-EU party GERB, served three terms as prime minister between 2009 and 2021. It won the 2009 general election and formed a minority government, which resigned in February 2013 after nationwide protests over the low living standards, corruption and the perceived failure of the democratic system. The subsequent snap elections in May resulted in a narrow win for GERB, but the Bulgarian Socialist Party eventually formed a government led by Plamen Oresharski after Borisov failed to secure parliamentary support. The Oresharski government resigned in July 2014 amid continuing large-scale protests. The October 2014 elections resulted in a third GERB victory. Borisov formed a coalition with several right-wing parties, but resigned again after the candidate backed by his party failed to win the 2016 Presidential election. The March 2017 snap election was again won by GERB, but with 95 seats in Parliament. They formed a coalition with the far-right United Patriots, who held 27 seats.

Borisov's last cabinet saw a dramatic decrease in freedom of the press, and a number of corruption revelations that triggered yet another wave of mass protests in 2020. GERB came out first in the regular April 2021 election, but with its weakest result so far. All other parties refused to form a government, and after a brief deadlock, another election was called for July 2021. It too failed to break the stalemate, as no political party was able to form a coalition government.

In April 2023, because of the political deadlock, Bulgaria held its fifth parliamentary election since April 2021. GERB was the biggest, winning 69 seats. The bloc led by We Continue the Change won 64 seats in the 240-seat parliament. In June 2023, Prime Minister Nikolai Denkov formed a new coalition between We Continue The Change and GERB. According to the coalition agreement, Denkov will lead the government for the first nine months. He will be succeeded by former European Commissioner, Mariya Gabriel, of the GERB party. She was supposed to take over as prime minister in nine months.

Denkov resigned in accordance with the rotation agreement on 5 March 2024, to allow Gabriel to become the new Prime Minister. On 20 March 2024, the planned government rotation and signing of a renewed government failed due to disagreements between the two alliances on the cabinet and breaking down of relations. Negotiations ensued across to form a new government, but failed to produce any governments that could reach a majority support. GERB rejected the chance to form a government. PP–DB made a limited attempt to respect the original rotation agreement. The final chance to form a government, chosen by president Rumen Radev, went to ITN, which was immediately rejected.

On 29 March, as per Article 98 of the constitution, the President appointed the Chairman of the National Audit Office, Dimitar Glavchev, as the candidate for caretaker prime minister. He was granted a one-week deadline of until 6 April 2024 to propose the composition of the caretaker government. Glavchev presented his proposal for the caretaker government on 5 April 2024, accepted by the President following negotiations and scheduling the election for 9 June 2024. Glavchev and his cabinet were inaugurated on 9 April 2024 by the National Assembly.

The new elected 51st Parliament replaced the 50th Parliament when all elected members were sworn in on 11 November 2024. After 11 voting rounds, Natalia Kiselova (BSP–OL) was elected as speaker of the National Assembly on 6 December 2024. President Rumen Radev granted the first negotiation mandate to the largest party GERB-SDS on 15 January 2025, which formed a minority government alongside BSP and ITN, with support from APS (Dogan). The government was led by GERB politician Rosen Zhelyazkov. The Zhelyazkovs government primary commitment had been the country's entry into the eurozone in 2026, which it achieved in 2025 when Bulgaria had its final hurdles cleared and adopted the legal framework to make the entry possible. The government survived a no-confidence vote days later due to Peevski's support, effectively creating a de factoconfidence and supply agreement. In December 2025, the Zhelyazkov government resigned after weeks of protests against the 2026 budget and corruption within the government.

Radev took a critical stance to adopting the eurozone and had tried to delay it by calling a referendum, a move that was described as illegal as the Constitutional Court of Bulgaria had already clarified in 2024 that Bulgaria was obliged to adopt the euro by its European treaties that were ratified when Bulgaria joined the EU. Radev's attempt was thereafter rejected at the time by Nataliya Kiselova (the then Speaker of the National Assembly of Bulgaria), and upheld by the Constitutional Court, a move that Radev sharply criticized. After it was confirmed there would be new elections in 2026, Radev resigned as President to contest the elections, and was succeeded by Iliana Iotova, who became the first female President of Bulgaria, Radev seeking to become Prime Minister and describing his political project as a "powerful political alternative" to return Bulgarians' trust in their state, with "clear rules for everyone".

On 18 February 2026, President Iliana Iotova appointed a caretaker government led by Prime Minister Andrey Gurov and set a parliamentary election to be held on 19 April 2026. Gyurov's government had asked the EU for help to fight off interference from Russia ahead of the election, warning foreign actors were trying to manipulate public opinion through social media networks and propaganda websites. Radev went on to win the elections in a landslide gaining a majority. On 8 May 2026, Rumen Radev was sworn in as Bulgaria's prime minister.

Freedom House has reported a continuing deterioration of democratic governance after 2009, citing reduced media independence, stalled reforms, abuse of authority at the highest level and increased dependence of local administrations on the central government. Bulgaria is still listed as "Free", with a political system designated as a semi-consolidated democracy, albeit with deteriorating scores. The Democracy Index defines it as a "flawed democracy". A 2018 survey by the Institute for Economics and Peace reported that less than 15% of respondents considered elections to be fair.

=== Legal system ===
Bulgaria has a civil law legal system. The judiciary is overseen by the Ministry of Justice. The Supreme Administrative Court and the Supreme Court of Cassation are the highest courts of appeal and oversee the application of laws in subordinate courts. The Supreme Judicial Council manages the system and appoints judges. The legal system is regarded by both domestic and international observers as one of Europe's most inefficient due to a pervasive lack of transparency and corruption. Law enforcement is carried out by organisations mainly subordinate to the Ministry of the Interior. The General Directorate of National Police (GDNP) combats general crime and maintains public order. GDNP fields 26,578 police officers in its local and national sections. The bulk of criminal cases are transport-related, followed by theft and drug-related crime; homicide rates are low. The Ministry of the Interior also heads the Border Police Service and the National Gendarmerie—a specialised branch for anti-terrorist activity, crisis management and riot control. Counterintelligence and national security are the responsibility of the State Agency for National Security.

=== Administrative divisions ===
Bulgaria is a unitary state. Since the 1880s, the number of territorial management units has varied from seven to 26. Between 1987 and 1999, the administrative structure consisted of nine provinces (oblasti, singular oblast). A new administrative structure was adopted in parallel with the decentralisation of the economic system. It includes 27 provinces and a metropolitan capital province (Sofia City). All areas take their names from their respective capital cities. The provinces are subdivided into 265 municipalities. Municipalities are run by mayors, who are elected to four-year terms, and by directly elected municipal councils. Bulgaria is a highly centralised state where the Council of Ministers directly appoints regional governors and all provinces and municipalities are heavily dependent on it for funding.

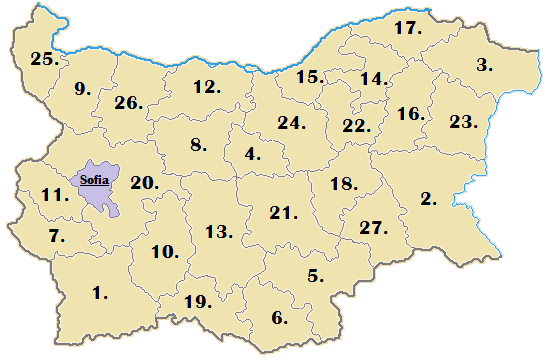

1. Blagoevgrad
2. Burgas
3. Dobrich
4. Gabrovo
5. Haskovo
6. Kardzhali
7. Kyustendil
8. Lovech
9. Montana
10. Pazardzhik
11. Pernik
12. Pleven
13. Plovdiv
14. Razgrad
15. Ruse
16. Shumen
17. Silistra
18. Sliven
19. Smolyan
20. Sofia Province
21. Stara Zagora
22. Targovishte
23. Varna
24. Veliko Tarnovo
25. Vidin
26. Vratsa
27. Yambol

=== Foreign relations ===
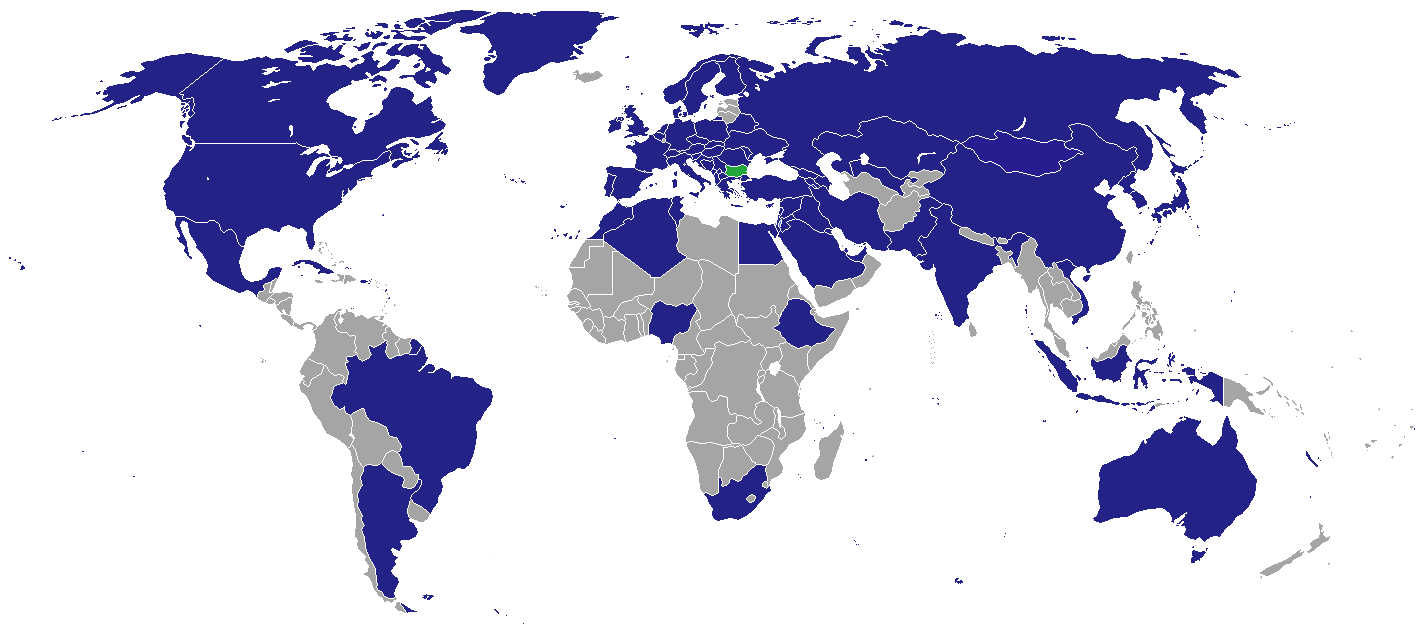
Diplomatic missions of Bulgaria

Bulgaria became a member of the United Nations in 1955. Since 1966, it has been a non-permanent member of the Security Council three times, most recently from 2002 to 2003. It was also among the founding nations of the Organisation for Security and Co-operation in Europe (OSCE) in 1975. Euro-Atlantic integration has been a priority since the fall of communism, although the communist leadership also had aspirations of leaving the Warsaw Pact and joining the European Communities by 1987. Bulgaria signed the European Union Treaty of Accession on 25 April 2005, and became a full member of the European Union on 1 January 2007. In addition, it has a tripartite economic and diplomatic collaboration with Romania and Greece, good ties with China and Vietnam and a historical relationship with Russia.

Bulgaria deployed significant numbers of both civilian and military advisors in Soviet-allied countries like Nicaragua and Libya during the Cold War. The first deployment of foreign troops on Bulgarian soil since World War II occurred in 2001, when the country hosted six KC-135 Stratotanker aircraft and 200 support personnel for the war effort in Afghanistan. International military relations were further expanded with accession to NATO in March 2004 and the US-Bulgarian Defence Cooperation Agreement signed in April 2006. Bezmer and Graf Ignatievo air bases, the Novo Selo training range, and a logistics centre in Aytos subsequently became joint military training facilities cooperatively used by the United States and Bulgarian militaries. Despite its active international defence collaborations, Bulgaria ranks as among the most peaceful countries globally, tying 6th alongside Iceland regarding domestic and international conflicts, and 26th on average in the Global Peace Index.

Following the 2022 Russian invasion of Ukraine, Bulgaria assisted Ukraine; in 2023, after Gazprom illegally stopped exporting gas to Bulgaria, the country in turn stopped importing Russian oil and gas.

=== Military ===
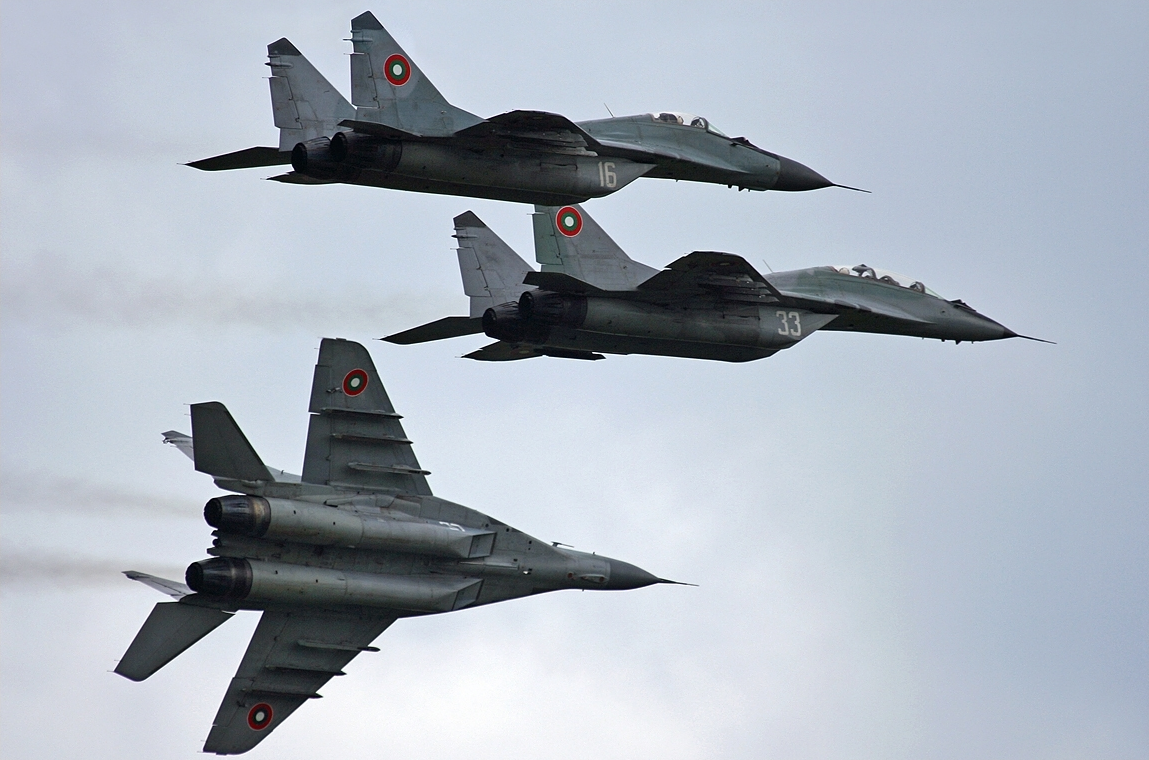
Mikoyan MiG-29 jet fighters of the Bulgarian Air Force

The Bulgarian Armed Forces are the military of Bulgaria and are composed of land forces, navy and an air force. The Armed Forces have 36,950 active troops, supplemented by 3,000 reservists. The land forces consist of two mechanised brigades and eight independent regiments and battalions; the air force operates 106 aircraft and air defence systems across six air bases, and the navy operates various ships, helicopters and coastal defence weapons. Military inventory mainly consists of Soviet equipment like Mikoyan MiG-29 and Sukhoi Su-25 jets, S-300PT air defence systems and SS-21 Scarab short-range ballistic missiles. The Armed Forces are modernising with F-16 Block 70 fighter jets, new multi-purpose corvettes and other modern NATO-standard equipment. Bulgaria is in the process of buying new US-built Stryker vehicles, new 155 mm self-propelled howitzers, new 3D early-warning radars, new surface-to-air missiles and more.

== Economy ==
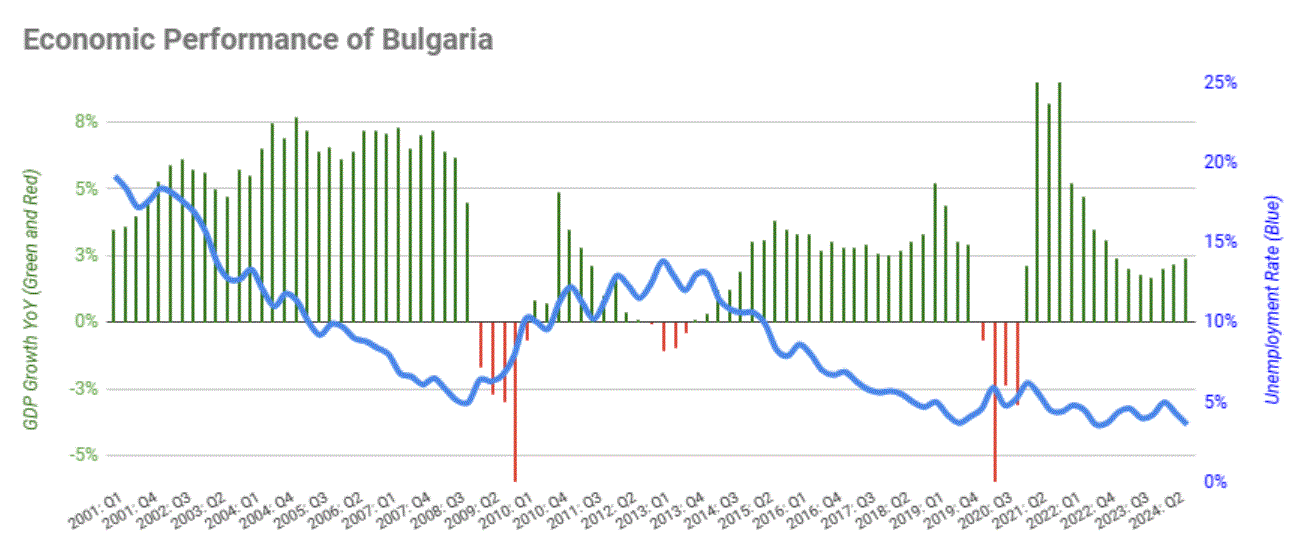
Economic growth (green) and unemployment (blue) statistics since 2001

Bulgaria has an advanced, high-income economy where the private sector accounts for more than 70% of GDP. From a largely agricultural country with a predominantly rural population in 1948, by the 1980s Bulgaria had transformed into an industrial economy, with scientific and technological research at the top of its budgetary expenditure priorities. The loss of COMECON markets in 1990 and the subsequent "shock therapy" of the planned system caused a steep decline in industrial and agricultural production, ultimately followed by an economic collapse in 1997. The economy largely recovered during a period of rapid growth several years later, but the average salary of 2,072 leva ($1,142) per month remains the lowest in the EU.

A balanced budget was achieved in 2003 and the country began running a surplus the following year. Expenditures amounted to $21.15 billion and revenues were $21.67 billion in 2017. Most government spending on institutions is earmarked for security. The ministries of defence, the interior and justice are allocated the largest share of the annual government budget, whereas those responsible for the environment, tourism and energy receive the least funding. Taxes form the bulk of government revenue at 30% of GDP. Bulgaria has some of the lowest corporate income tax rates in the EU at a flat 10% rate. The tax system is two-tier. Value added tax, excise duties, corporate and personal income tax are national, whereas real estate, inheritance, and vehicle taxes are levied by local authorities. Strong economic performance in the early 2000s reduced government debt from 79.6% in 1998 to 14.1% in 2008. It has since increased to 22.6% of GDP by 2022, but remains the second lowest in the EU.

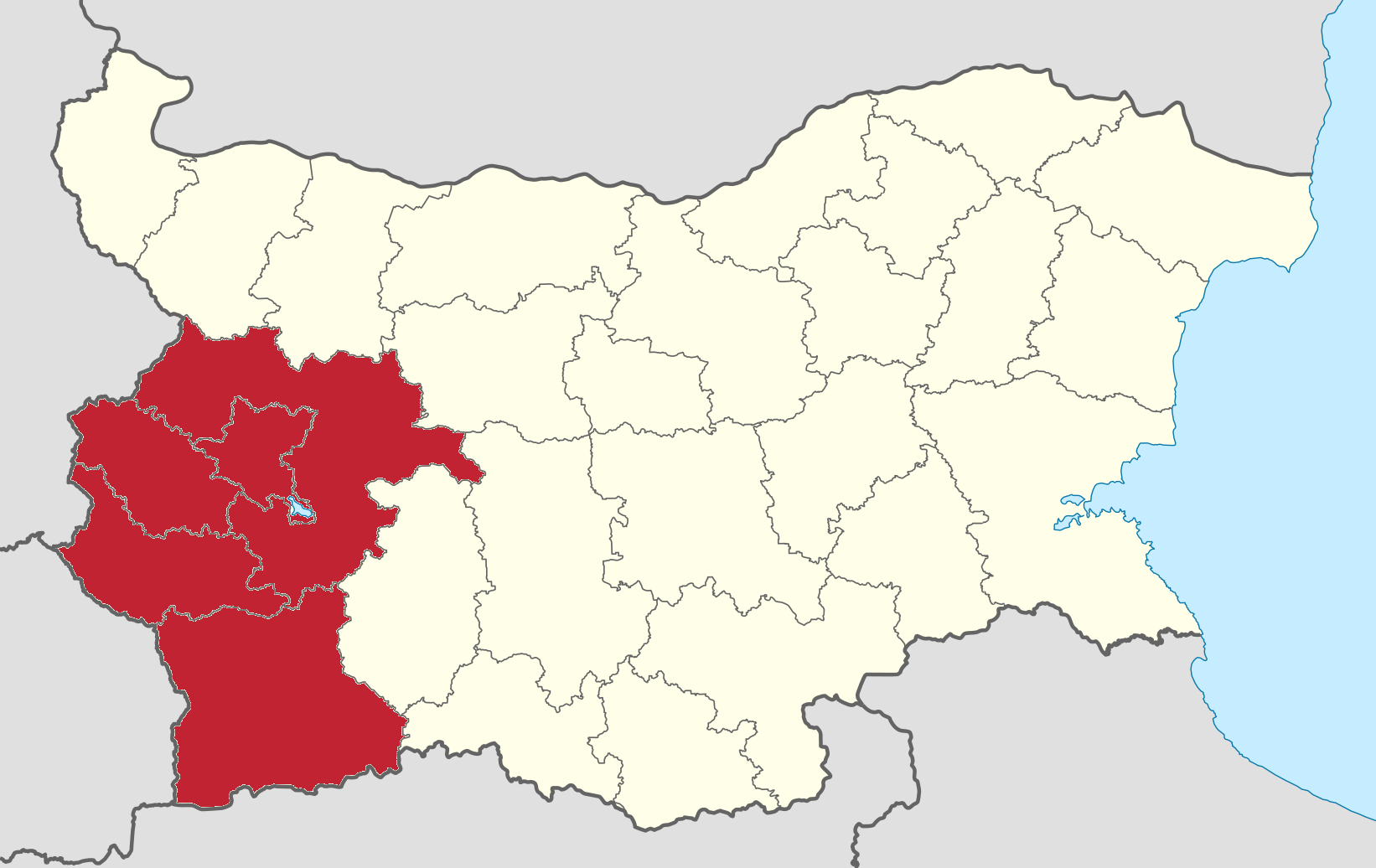
The Yugozapaden planning area is Bulgaria's most developed region.

The Yugozapaden planning area is the most developed region with a per capita gross domestic product (PPP) of $29,816 in 2018. It includes the capital city and the surrounding Sofia Province, which alone generate 42% of national gross domestic product despite hosting only 22% of the population. GDP per capita (in PPS) and the cost of living in 2019 stood at 53 and 52.8% of the EU average (100%), respectively. National PPP GDP was estimated at $143.1 billion in 2016, with a per capita value of $20,116. Economic growth statistics take into account illegal transactions from the informal economy, which is the largest in the EU as a percentage of economic output.

After several consecutive years of high growth, repercussions of the 2008 financial crisis resulted in a 3.6% contraction of GDP in 2009 and increased unemployment. Positive growth was restored in 2010 but intercompany debt exceeded $59 billion, meaning that 60% of all Bulgarian companies were mutually indebted. By 2012, it had increased to $97 billion, or 227% of GDP. The government implemented strict austerity measures with IMF and EU encouragement to some positive fiscal results, but the social consequences of these measures, such as increased income inequality and accelerated outward migration, have been "catastrophic" according to the International Trade Union Confederation.

Siphoning of public funds to the families and relatives of politicians from incumbent parties has resulted in fiscal and welfare losses to society. Bulgaria ranked 71st in the Corruption Perceptions Index in 2017 and experiences the worst levels of corruption in the European Union, a phenomenon that remains a source of profound public discontent. Along with organised crime, corruption has resulted in a rejection of the country's Schengen Area application and withdrawal of foreign investment, though the country officially became a full member of the zone in January 2025. Government officials reportedly engage in embezzlement, influence trading, government procurement violations and bribery with impunity. Government procurement in particular is a critical area in corruption risk. An estimated 10 billion leva ($5.99 billion) of state budget and European cohesion funds are spent on public tenders each year; nearly 14 billion ($8.38 billion) were spent on public contracts in 2017 alone. A large share of these contracts are awarded to a few politically connected companies amid widespread irregularities, procedure violations and tailor-made award criteria. Despite repeated criticism from the European Commission, EU institutions refrain from taking measures against Bulgaria because it supports Brussels on a number of issues, unlike Poland or Hungary.

=== Currency ===
From 1880 to 2026, the Bulgarian National Bank issued its own national currency, lev, which was pegged to the euro at a rate of 1.95583 leva per euro. When Bulgaria joined the EU in 2007 it committed to join the eurozone and replace its currency, the lev, with the euro. In February 2025, the country officially requested off-cycle assessments of their convergence by the European Commission and ECB to determine the country's readiness. The 2025 convergence reports published on 4 June 2025 concluded that Bulgaria met the convergence criteria. On 8 July 2025, the European Parliament endorsed Bulgaria's entry in the eurozone and the Council of the European Union adopted the final three legislative acts required for the admission.

Bulgaria adopted the euro as currency, becoming a part of the euro area on 1 January 2026. The lev and euro were in dual circulation until 31 January 2026; after 1 February 2026, the euro has been the nation's sole currency.

=== Structure and sectors ===
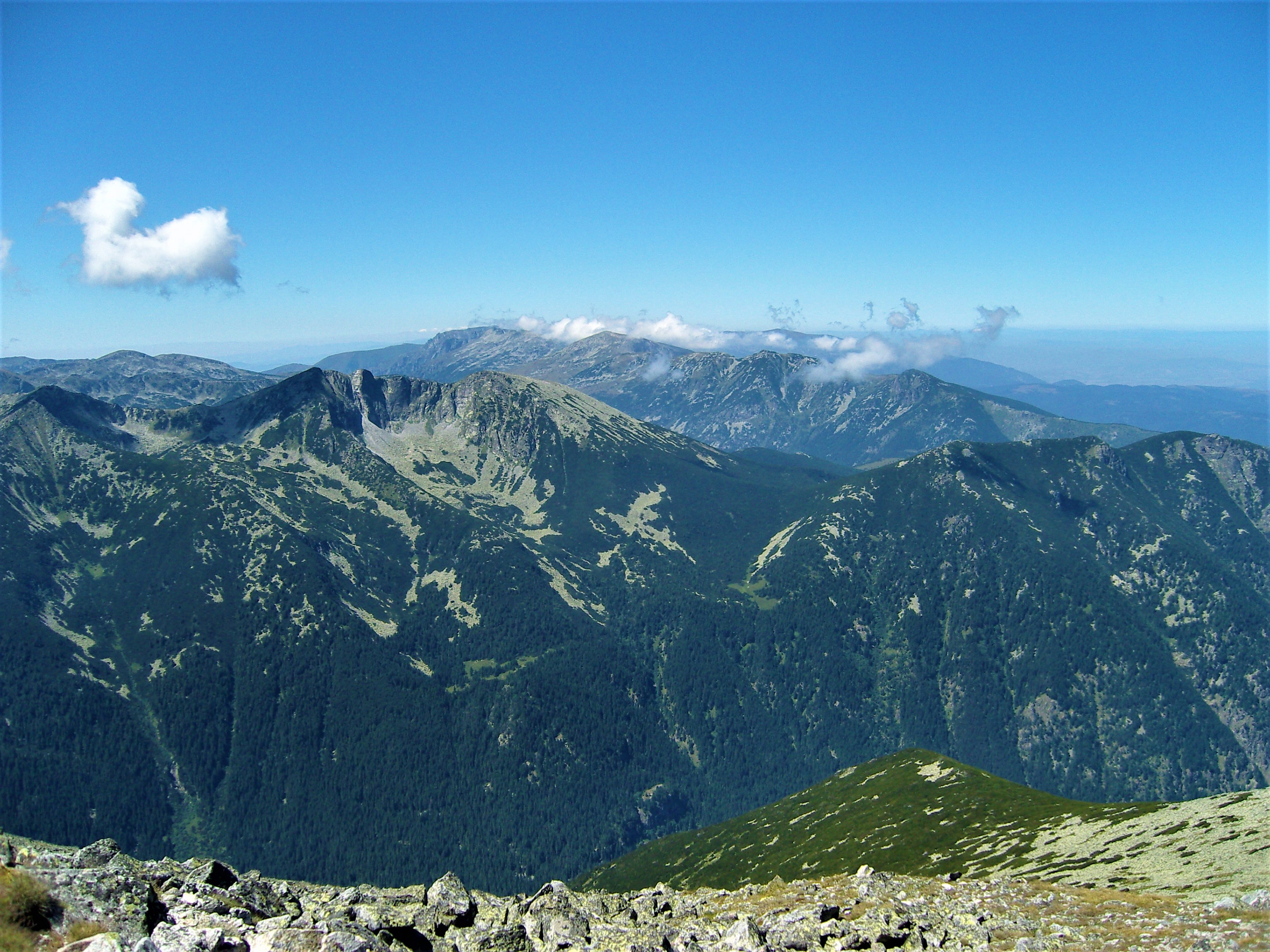
Rila, the highest mountain in Southeast Europe

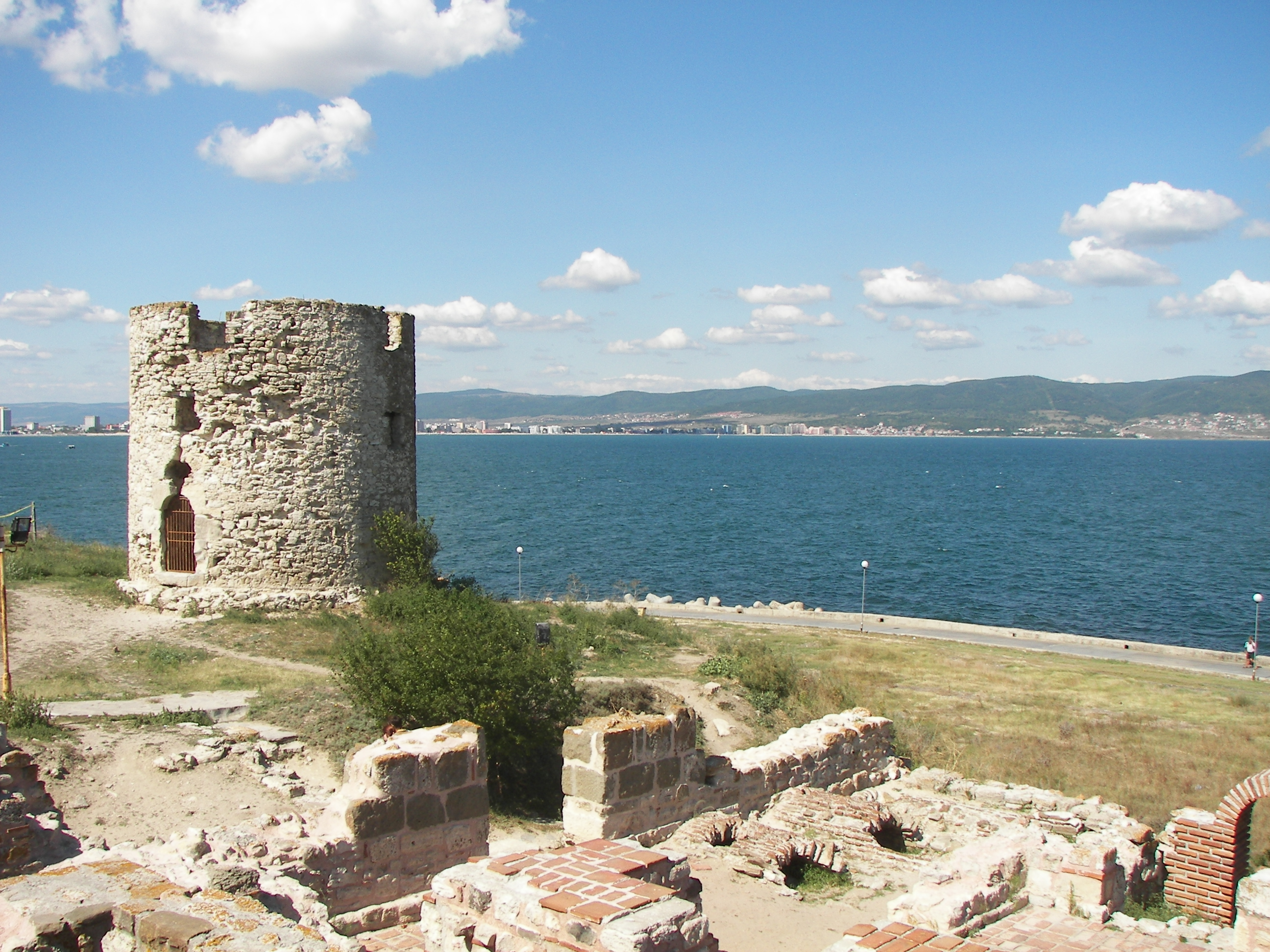
Nesebar

The labour force is 3.36 million people, of whom 6.8% are employed in agriculture, 26.6% in industry and 66.6% in the services sector. Extraction of metals and minerals, production of chemicals, machine building, steel, biotechnology, tobacco, food processing and petroleum refining are among the major industrial activities. Mining alone employs 24,000 people and generates about 5% of the country's GDP; the number of employed in all mining-related industries is 120,000. Bulgaria is Europe's fifth-largest coal producer. Local deposits of coal, iron, copper and lead are vital for the manufacturing and energy sectors. The main destinations of Bulgarian exports outside the EU are Turkey, China and Serbia, while Russia, Turkey and China are by far the largest import partners. Most of the exports are manufactured goods, machinery, chemicals, fuel products and food. Two-thirds of food and agricultural exports go to OECD countries.

Although cereal and vegetable output dropped by 40% between 1990 and 2008, output in grains has since increased, and the 2016–2017 season registered the biggest grain output in a decade. Maize, barley, oats and rice are also grown. Quality Oriental tobacco is a significant industrial crop. Bulgaria is also the largest producer globally of lavender and rose oil, both widely used in fragrances. Within the services sector, tourism is a significant contributor to economic growth. Sofia, Plovdiv, Veliko Tarnovo, coastal resorts Albena, Golden Sands and Sunny Beach and winter resorts Bansko, Pamporovo and Borovets are some of the locations most visited by tourists. Most visitors are Romanian, Turkish, Greek and German. Tourism is additionally encouraged through the 100 Tourist Sites system.

=== Science and technology ===
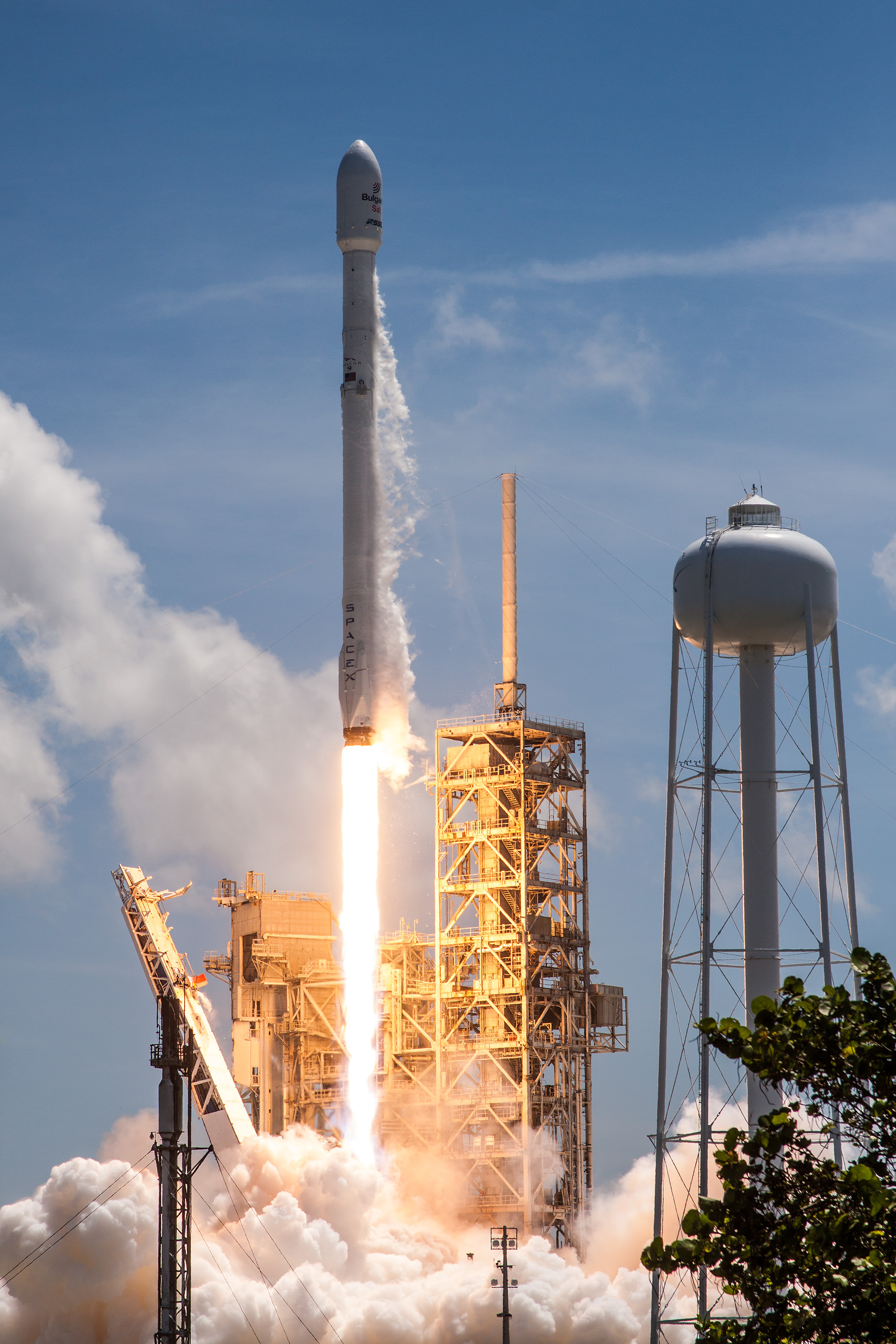
The launch of BulgariaSat-1 by SpaceX

Spending on research and development amounts to 0.78% of GDP, and the bulk of public R&D funding goes to the Bulgarian Academy of Sciences (BAS). Private businesses accounted for more than 73% of R&D expenditures and employed 42% of Bulgaria's 22,000 researchers in 2015. The same year, Bulgaria ranked 39th out of 50 countries in the Bloomberg Innovation Index, the highest score being in education (24th) and the lowest in value-added manufacturing (48th). Bulgaria was ranked 37th in the Global Innovation Index in 2025. Chronic government underinvestment in research since 1990 has forced many professionals in science and engineering to leave Bulgaria.

Despite the lack of funding, research in chemistry, materials science and physics remains strong. Antarctic research is actively carried out through the St. Kliment Ohridski Base on Livingston Island in Western Antarctica. The information and communication technologies (ICT) sector generates three per cent of economic output and employs 40,000 to 51,000 software engineers. Bulgaria was known as a "Communist Silicon Valley" during the Soviet era due to its key role in COMECON computing technology production. A concerted effort by the communist government to teach computing and IT skills in schools also indirectly made Bulgaria a major source of computer viruses in the 1980s and 90s. The country is a regional leader in high performance computing: it operates Avitohol, the most powerful supercomputer in Southeast Europe, and will host one of the eight petascale EuroHPC supercomputers.

Bulgaria has made numerous contributions to space exploration. These include two scientific satellites, more than 200 payloads and 300 experiments in Earth orbit, as well as two cosmonauts since 1971. Bulgaria was the first country to grow wheat in space with its Svet greenhouses on the Mir space station. It was involved in the development of the Granat gamma-ray observatory and the Vega programme, particularly in modelling trajectories and guidance algorithms for both Vega probes. Bulgarian instruments have been used in the exploration of Mars, including a spectrometer that took the first high quality spectroscopic images of Martian moon Phobos with the Phobos 2 probe. Cosmic radiation en route to and around the planet has been mapped by Liulin-ML dosimeters on the ExoMars TGO. Variants of these instruments have also been fitted on the International Space Station and the Chandrayaan-1 lunar probe. Another lunar mission, SpaceIL's Beresheet, was also equipped with a Bulgarian-manufactured imaging payload. Bulgaria's first geostationary communications satellite—BulgariaSat-1—was launched by SpaceX in 2017.

=== Infrastructure ===
Telephone services are widely available, and a central digital trunk line connects most regions. Vivacom (BTC) serves more than 90% of fixed lines and is one of the three operators providing mobile services, along with A1 and Yettel. Internet penetration stood at 69.2% of the population aged 16–74 and 78.9% of households in 2020.

Bulgaria's strategic geographic location and well-developed energy sector make it a key European energy centre despite its lack of significant fossil fuel deposits. Thermal power plants generate 48.9% of electricity, followed by nuclear power from the Kozloduy reactors (34.8%) and renewable sources (16.3%). Equipment for a second nuclear power station at Belene has been acquired, but the fate of the project remains uncertain. Installed capacity amounts to 12,668 MW, allowing Bulgaria to exceed domestic demand and export energy.

The national road network has a total length of 19,512 kilometres (12,124 mi), of which 19,235 kilometres (11,952 mi) are paved. Railroads are a major mode of freight transportation, although highways carry a progressively larger share of freight. Bulgaria has 6,238 kilometres (3,876 mi) of railway track, with rail links available to Romania, Turkey, Greece, and Serbia, and express trains serving direct routes to Kyiv, Minsk, Moscow and Saint Petersburg. Sofia is the country's air travel hub, while Varna and Burgas are the principal maritime trade ports.

== Demographics ==
Ethnic groups in Bulgaria (2021 census)
1. Bulgarians (84.6%)
2. Turks (8.40%)
3. Romani (4.41%)
4. Others (1.31%)
5. Undeclared (1.31%)

According to the government's official 2022 estimate, the population of Bulgaria consists of 6,447,710 people, down from 6,519,789 according to the last official census in 2021. The majority of the population, 72.5%, reside in urban areas. As of 2019, Sofia is the most populated urban centre with 1,241,675 people, followed by Plovdiv (346,893), Varna (336,505), Burgas (202,434) and Ruse (142,902). Bulgarians are the main ethnic group and constitute 84.6% of the population. Turkish and Roma minorities account for 8.4 and 4.4%, respectively; some 40 smaller minorities account for 1.3%, and 1.3% do not self-identify with an ethnic group. The Roma minority is usually underestimated in census data and may represent up to 11% of the population. Population density is 55–60 per square kilometre (ultimo 2023), almost half the European Union average.

Bulgaria is in a state of demographic crisis. It has had negative population growth since 1989, when the post-Cold War economic collapse caused a long-lasting emigration wave. Some 937,000 to 1,200,000 people—mostly young adults—had left the country by 2005. The majority of children are born to unmarried women. In 2024, the average total fertility rate (TFR) in Bulgaria was 1.59 children per woman, a slight increase from 1.56 in 2018, and well above the all-time low of 1.1 in 1997, but still below the replacement rate of 2.1 and considerably below the historical high of 5.83 children per woman in 1905. Bulgaria thus has one of the oldest populations in the world, with an average age of 43 years. Furthermore, a third of all households consist of only one person and 75.5% of families do not have children under the age of 16. The resulting birth rates are among the lowest in the world while death rates are among the highest.

Bulgaria scores high in gender equality, ranking 18th in the 2018 Global Gender Gap Report. Although women's suffrage was enabled relatively late, in 1937, women today have equal political rights, high workforce participation and legally mandated equal pay. In 2021, market research agency Reboot Online ranked Bulgaria as the best European country for women to work. Bulgaria has the highest ratio of female ICT researchers in the EU, as well as the second-highest ratio of females in the technology sector at 44.6% of the workforce. High levels of female participation are a legacy of the Socialist era.

=== Largest cities ===
Largest cities or towns in Bulgaria 2023 official estimates
Rank	Name	Province	Pop.	Rank	Name	Province	Pop.
1	Sofia	Sofia-Capital	1,196,806	11	Pernik	Pernik	66,261
2	Plovdiv	Plovdiv	325,485	12	Haskovo	Haskovo	63,776
3	Varna	Varna	314,607	13	Blagoevgrad	Blagoevgrad	62,346
4	Burgas	Burgas	188,114	14	Yambol	Yambol	59,755
5	Ruse	Ruse	122,116	15	Veliko Tarnovo	Veliko Tarnovo	59,331
6	Stara Zagora	Stara Zagora	121,207	16	Pazardzhik	Pazardzhik	54,652
7	Pleven	Pleven	89,030	17	Vratsa	Vratsa	48,406
8	Sliven	Sliven	78,627	18	Asenovgrad	Plovdiv	45,474
9	Dobrich	Dobrich	70,411	19	Gabrovo	Gabrovo	44,232
10	Shumen	Shumen	67,300	20	Kazanlak	Stara Zagora	41,768

=== Health ===
High death rates result from a combination of an ageing population, high numbers of people at risk of poverty, and a weak healthcare system. Over 80% of deaths are due to cancer and cardiovascular conditions; nearly a fifth of those are avoidable. Although healthcare in Bulgaria is nominally universal, out-of-pocket expenses account for nearly half of all healthcare spending, significantly limiting access to medical care. Other problems disrupting care provision are the emigration of doctors due to low wages, understaffed and under-equipped regional hospitals, supply shortages and frequent changes to the basic service package for those insured. The 2018 Bloomberg Health Care Efficiency Index ranked Bulgaria last out of 56 countries. Average life expectancy is 74.8 years, compared with an EU average of 80.99 and a world average of 72.38.

=== Education ===
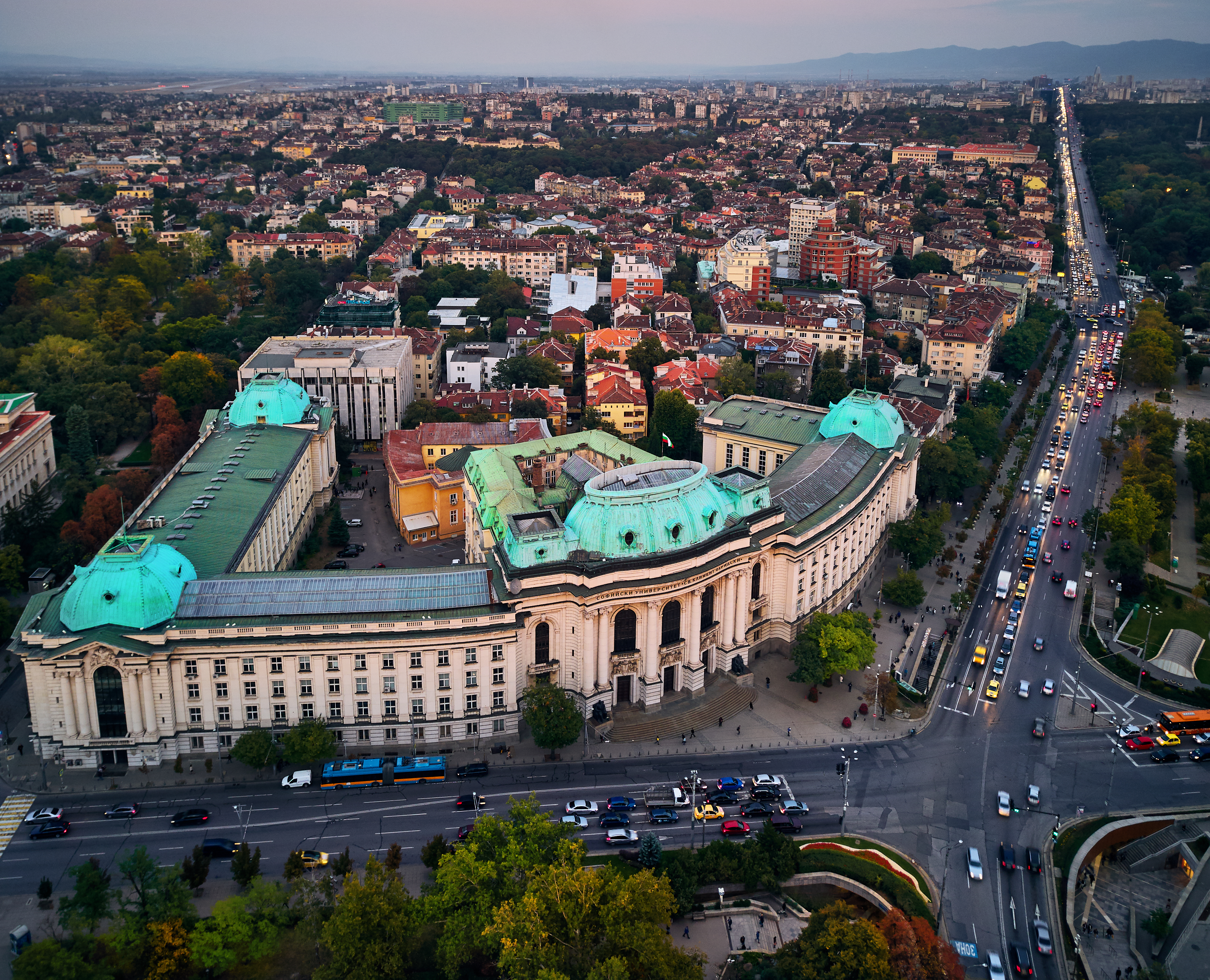
The Rectorate of Sofia University

Public expenditures for education are far below the European Union average as well. Educational standards were once high, but have declined significantly since the early 2000s. Bulgarian students were among the highest-scoring in the world in terms of reading in 2001, performing better than their Canadian and German counterparts; by 2006, scores in reading, mathematics and science had dropped. By 2018, Programme for International Student Assessment studies found 47% of pupils in the 9th grade to be functionally illiterate in reading and natural sciences. Average basic literacy stands high at 98.4% with no significant difference between sexes.

The Ministry of Education and Science partially funds public schools, colleges and universities, sets criteria for textbooks and oversees the publishing process. Education in primary and secondary public schools is free and compulsory. The process spans 12 grades, in which grades one through eight are primary and nine through twelve are secondary level. Higher education consists of a 4-year bachelor degree and a 1-year master's degree. Bulgaria's highest-ranked higher education institution is Sofia University.

=== Language ===
Bulgarian is the only language with official status. It belongs to the Slavic group of languages but has a number of grammatical peculiarities that set it apart from other Slavic languages: these include a complex verbal morphology (which also codes for distinctions in evidentiality), the absence of noun cases and infinitives, and the use of a suffixed definite article.

=== Religion ===
St. Alexander Nevsky Cathedral, Sofia

Bulgaria is a secular state with guaranteed freedom of religion by constitution, but Eastern Orthodox Christianity is designated as the traditional religion of the country. Approximately two-thirds of Bulgarians identify as Eastern Orthodox Christians. The Bulgarian Orthodox Church was the first church apart from the Four Ancient Patriarchates of the Eastern Orthodox Church—in Constantinople, Alexandria, Antioch and Jerusalem—and the first national church to gain autocephalous status in 927 AD. The Bulgarian Patriarchate has 12 dioceses and over 2,000 priests.

Muslims are the second-largest religious community and constitute approximately 10% of Bulgaria's population. A 2011 survey of 850 Muslims in Bulgaria found 30% professing to be "deeply religious" and 50% as just "religious". According to the study, some religious teachings, like Islamic funeral, have been traditionally incorporated and are widely practised while other major ones are less observed, such as the Muslim prayer or abstaining from drinking alcohol, eating pork, and cohabitation.

Other important religions include Roman Catholicism and Judaism, whose history in Bulgaria dates back to the early Middle Ages, the Armenian Apostolic Church, as well as various Protestant denominations, all of which stand for around 2% of Bulgaria's population. An ever increasing number of Bulgarians are either irreligious or unaffiliated with any religion, a percentage that has been growing rapidly over the past 20 years, from 3.9% in 2001, through 9.3% in 2011 and all the way to 15.9% in 2021.

According to the most recent census of 2021 the religious denominations of the population are as follows: Christian (71.5%), Muslim (10.8%), other religions (0.1%). A further 12.4% were unaffiliated or did not respond.

== Culture ==
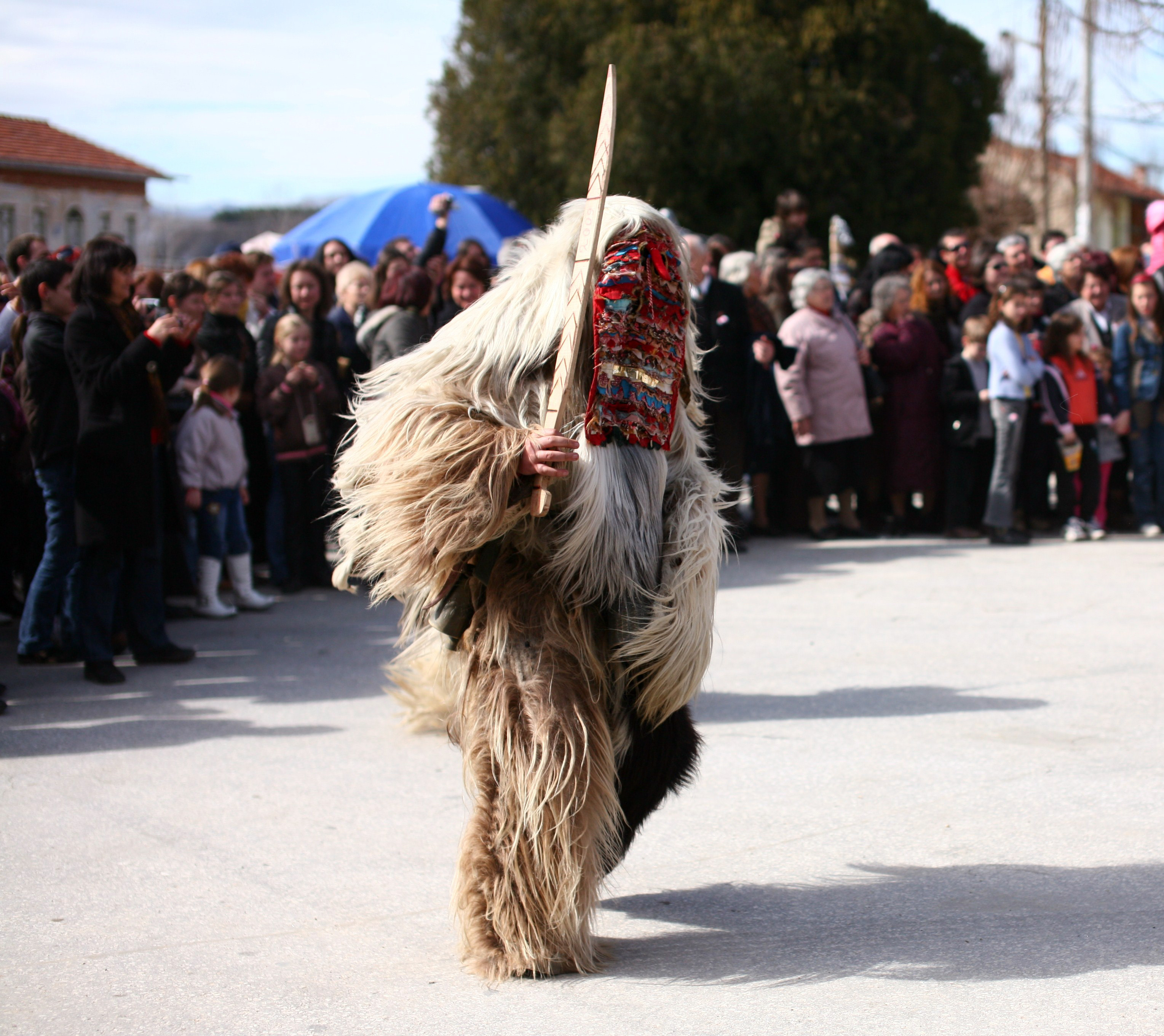
Kuker in Lesichovo

Contemporary Bulgarian culture blends the formal culture that helped forge a national consciousness towards the end of Ottoman rule with millennia-old folk traditions. An essential element of Bulgarian folklore is fire, used to banish evil spirits and illnesses. Many of these are personified as witches, whereas other creatures like zmey and samodiva (veela) are either benevolent guardians or ambivalent tricksters. Some rituals against evil spirits have survived and are still practised, most notably kukeri and survakari. Martenitsa is also widely celebrated. Nestinarstvo, a ritual fire-dance of Thracian origin, is included in the list of UNESCO Intangible Cultural Heritage. Nine historical and natural objects are UNESCO World Heritage Sites: Pirin National Park, Sreburna Nature Reserve, the Madara Rider, the Thracian tombs in Sveshtari and Kazanlak, the Rila Monastery, the Boyana Church, the Rock-hewn Churches of Ivanovo and the ancient city of Nesebar. The Rila Monastery was established by Saint John of Rila, Bulgaria's patron saint, whose life has been the subject of numerous literary accounts since Medieval times.

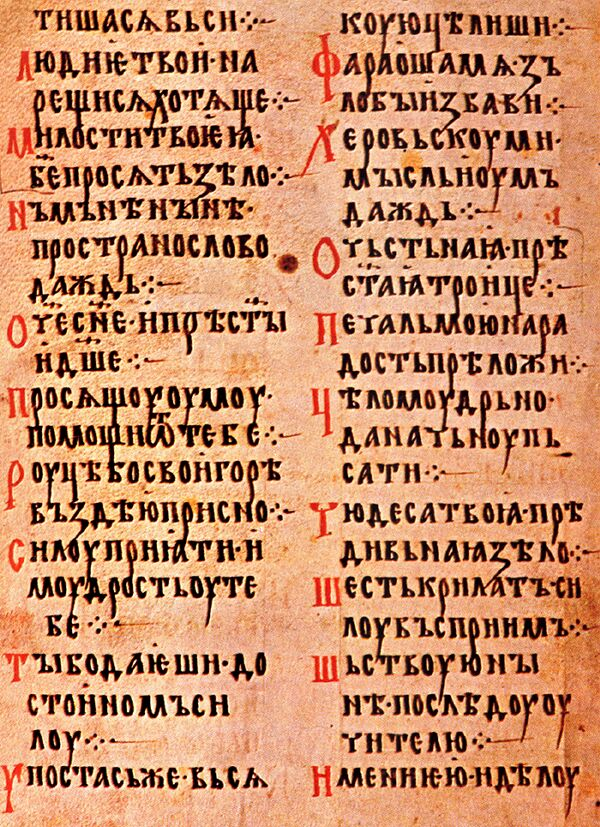
A page with the Alphabet Prayer by Constantine of Preslav

The establishment of the Preslav and Ohrid literary schools in the 10th century is associated with a golden period in Bulgarian literature during the Middle Ages. The schools' emphasis on Christian scriptures made the Bulgarian Empire a centre of Slavic culture, bringing Slavs under the influence of Christianity and providing them with a written language. Its alphabet, Cyrillic script, was developed by the Preslav Literary School. The Tarnovo Literary School, on the other hand, is associated with a Silver age of literature defined by high-quality manuscripts on historical or mystical themes under the Asen and Shishman dynasties. Many literary and artistic masterpieces were destroyed by the Ottoman conquerors, and artistic activities did not re-emerge until the National Revival in the 19th century. The enormous body of work of Ivan Vazov (1850–1921) covered every genre and touched upon every facet of Bulgarian society, bridging pre-Liberation works with literature of the newly established state. Notable later works are Bay Ganyo by Aleko Konstantinov, the Nietzschean poetry of Pencho Slaveykov, the Symbolist poetry of Peyo Yavorov and Dimcho Debelyanov, the Marxist-inspired works of Geo Milev and Nikola Vaptsarov, and the Socialist realism novels of Dimitar Dimov and Dimitar Talev. Tzvetan Todorov is a notable contemporary author, while Bulgarian-born Elias Canetti was awarded the Nobel Prize in Literature in 1981.

А religious visual arts heritage includes frescoes, murals and icons, many produced by the medieval Tarnovo Artistic School. Like literature, it was not until the National Revival when Bulgarian visual arts began to reemerge. Zahari Zograf was a pioneer of the visual arts in the pre-Liberation era. After the Liberation, Ivan Mrkvička, Anton Mitov, Vladimir Dimitrov, Tsanko Lavrenov and Zlatyu Boyadzhiev introduced newer styles and substance, depicting scenery from Bulgarian villages, old towns and historical subjects. Christo is the most famous Bulgarian artist of the 21st century, known for his outdoor installations.

Folk music is by far the most extensive traditional art and has slowly developed throughout the ages as a fusion of Far Eastern, Oriental, medieval Eastern Orthodox and standard Western European tonalities and modes. Bulgarian folk music has a distinctive sound and uses a wide range of traditional instruments, such as gadulka, gaida, kaval and tupan. A distinguishing feature is extended rhythmical time, which has no equivalent in the rest of European music. The State Television Female Vocal Choir won a Grammy Award in 1990 for its performances of Bulgarian folk music. Written musical composition can be traced back to the works of Yoan Kukuzel (c. 1280–1360), but modern classical music began with Emanuil Manolov, who composed the first Bulgarian opera in 1890. Pancho Vladigerov and Petko Staynov further enriched symphony, ballet and opera, which singers Ghena Dimitrova, Boris Christoff, Ljuba Welitsch and Nicolai Ghiaurov elevated to a world-class level. (Note: Cited to multiple sources) Bulgarian performers have gained acclaim in other genres like electropop (Mira Aroyo), jazz (Milcho Leviev) and blends of jazz and folk (Ivo Papazov).

The Bulgarian National Radio, bTV and daily newspapers Trud, Dnevnik and 24 Chasa are some of the largest national media outlets. Bulgarian media were described as generally unbiased in their reporting in the early 2000s and print media had no legal restrictions. Since then, freedom of the press has deteriorated to the point where Bulgaria scores 111th globally in the World Press Freedom Index, lower than all European Union members and membership candidate states. The government has diverted EU funds to sympathetic media outlets and bribed others to be less critical on problematic topics, while attacks against individual journalists have increased. Collusion between politicians, oligarchs and the media is widespread.

Bulgarian cuisine is similar to that of other Balkan countries and demonstrates strong Turkish and Greek influences. Yogurt, lukanka, banitsa, shopska salad, lyutenitsa and kozunak are among the best-known local foods. Meat consumption is lower than the European average, given a cultural preference for a large variety of salads. Bulgaria was the world's second-largest wine exporter until 1989, but has since lost that position. The 2016 harvest yielded 128 million litres of wine, of which 62 million was exported mainly to Romania, Poland and Russia. Mavrud, Rubin, Shiroka melnishka, Dimiat and Cherven Misket are the typical grapes used in Bulgarian wine. Rakia is a traditional fruit brandy that was consumed in Bulgaria as early as the 14th century.

=== Sports ===
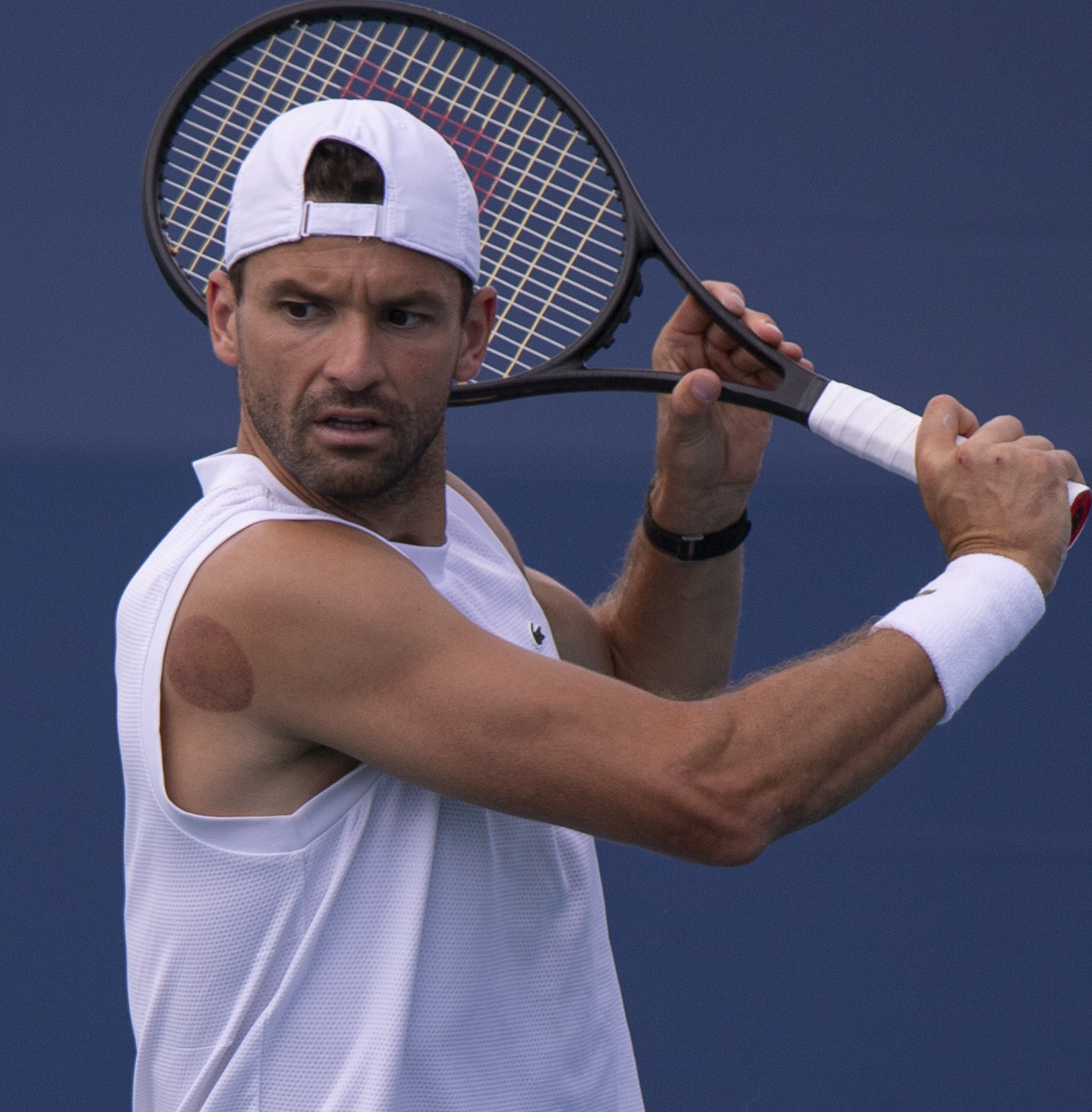
Grigor Dimitrov at the 2025 Miami Open

Bulgaria appeared at the first modern Olympic games in 1896, when it was represented by Swiss gymnast Charles Champaud. Since then, Bulgarian athletes have won 55 gold, 90 silver, and 85 bronze medals, ranking 25th in the all-time medal table. Weightlifting and wrestling are signature sports of Bulgaria. As of 2025, Bulgaria ranks 2nd in the all-time medal table of the European Weightlifting Championships, 3rd in the all-time medal table of the World Weightlifting Championships, 4th in the all-time medal table for Weightlifting at the Summer Olympics, 3rd in the all-time medal table of the European Wrestling Championships, 6th in the all-time medal table of the World Wrestling Championships and 9th in the all-time medal table for wrestling at the Summer Olympics. Coach Ivan Abadzhiev developed innovative training practices that allowed Bulgaria to dominate weightlifting in the 1980s.

Bulgarian athletes have also excelled in boxing, gymnastics, volleyball and tennis. Stefka Kostadinova's world record in women's high jump, achieved at the 1987 World Championships, remained unbroken until 2024, making it one of the longest-standing world records in history. Grigor Dimitrov was the first Bulgarian tennis player in the Top 3 ATP rankings.

Football is the most popular sport in the country. The Bulgarian national football team's best performance was a 4th-place finish at the 1994 FIFA World Cup, when the squad was spearheaded by the top goalscorer for the tournament – Hristo Stoichkov. Stoichkov is the most successful Bulgarian player of all time; he was awarded the Golden Boot and the Ballon d'Or and was considered one of the best players in the world while playing for FC Barcelona in the 1990s. CSKA Sofia and Levski Sofia are the most successful clubs domestically and long-standing rivals. Ludogorets is remarkable for having advanced from the local fourth division to the 2014–15 UEFA Champions League group stage in a mere nine years. Placed 39th in 2018, it is Bulgaria's highest-ranked club in UEFA.

== See also ==
- Outline of Bulgaria

== Bibliography ==
- Население по области, общини, местоживеене и пол [Population by Province, Municipality, Address and Sex as of 31 December 2017] (in Bulgarian). National Statistical Institute of Bulgaria. 2017.
- Преброяване 2011 (окончателни данни) [Final Results of the 2011 census] (PDF) (in Bulgarian). National Statistical Institute of Bulgaria. 2011. Archived from the original (PDF) on 22 December 2018.
- "Bulgaria 2018" (PDF) (in Bulgarian and English). National Statistical Institute of Bulgaria. 2018.
- Curtis, Glenn (20 October 2006). Country Profile: Bulgaria (PDF) (Report). Federal Research Division. Archived (PDF) from the original on 3 January 2024 – via Library of Congress.
- "State of Health in the EU. Country Health Profile: Bulgaria 2017" (PDF). European Commission. Archived (PDF) from the original on 9 October 2022.
- Ангелов (Angelov), Димитър (Dimitar); Божилов (Bozhilov), Иван (Ivan); Ваклинов (Vaklinov), Станчо (Stancho); Гюзелев (Gyuzelev), Васил (Vasil); Куев (Kuev), Кую (kuyu); Петров (Petrov), Петър (Petar); Примов (Primov), Борислав (Borislav); Тъпкова (Tapkova), Василка (Vasilka); Цанокова (Tsankova), Геновева (Genoveva) (1981). История на България. Том II. Първа българска държава [History of Bulgaria. Volume II. First Bulgarian State] (in Bulgarian). и колектив. София (Sofia): Издателство на БАН (Bulgarian Academy of Sciences Press).
- Bell, John (1998). Bulgaria in Transition: Politics, Economics, Society, and Culture after Communism. Westview Press. ISBN 978-0-8133-9010-9.
- Божилов (Bozhilov), Иван (Ivan); Гюзелев (Gyuzelev), Васил (Vasil) (1999). История на средновековна България VII–XIV век (History of Medieval Bulgaria VII–XIV centuries) (in Bulgarian). София (Sofia): Анубис (Anubis). ISBN 954-426-204-0.
- Chen, Sanping (2012). Multicultural China in the Early Middle Ages. University of Pennsylvania Press. ISBN 978-0-8122-4370-3.
- Crampton, R. J. (1987). A Short History of Modern Bulgaria. Cambridge University Press. ISBN 978-0-521-25340-6.
- Crampton, R. J. (2005). A Concise History of Bulgaria. Cambridge University Press. ISBN 978-0-521-61637-9.
- Crampton, R. J. (2007). Bulgaria. Oxford University Press. ISBN 978-0-19-954158-4.
- Curtis, Glenn E.; Mitova, Pamela; Marsteller, William; Soper, Karl Wheeler (1992). Country Study: Bulgaria. Area handbook series. Library of Congress. ISBN 978-0-8444-0751-7 – via Library of Congress Country Studies.
  - "Historical Setting". Chapter 1. Archived from the original on 20 September 2008.
  - "The First Golden Age". Chapter 1. Archived from the original on 21 September 2008.
  - "The Final Move to Independence". The Bulgarian Independence Movement. Archived from the original on 20 September 2008.
  - "San Stefano, Berlin, and Independence". The Bulgarian Independence Movement. Archived from the original on 21 September 2008.
  - "Bulgaria in World War II: The Passive Alliance". World War II. Archived from the original on 21 September 2008.
  - "Wartime Crisis". World War II. Archived from the original on 20 September 2008.
  - "The Soviet Occupation". World War II. Archived from the original on 21 September 2008.
  - "After Stalin". Communist Consolidation. Archived from the original on 20 September 2008.
  - "Domestic Policy and Its Results". Communist Consolidation. Archived from the original on 20 September 2008.
  - "Foreign Affairs in the 1960s and 1970s". The Zhivkov Era. Archived from the original on 21 September 2008.
  - "The Political Atmosphere in the 1970s". The Zhivkov Era. Archived from the original on 20 September 2008.
  - "Bulgaria in the 1980s". The Zhivkov Era. Archived from the original on 20 September 2008.
  - "Topography". The Society and its Environment. Archived from the original on 21 September 2008.
  - "Climate". The Society and its Environment. Archived from the original on 21 September 2008.
  - "The Economy". Chapter 3. Archived from the original on 20 September 2008.
  - "Resource Base". The Economy. Archived from the original on 20 September 2008.
  - "Government and Politics". Chapter 4. Archived from the original on 21 September 2008.
  - "Arms Sales". National Security. Archived from the original on 20 September 2008.
  - "Military Personnel". National Security. Archived from the original on 21 September 2008.
- Fine, J. (1987). The Late Medieval Balkans, A Critical Survey from the Late Twelfth Century to the Ottoman Conquest. University of Michigan Press. ISBN 0-472-10079-3.
- Ghodsee, Kristen R. (2011). Lost in Transition: Ethnographies of Everyday Life After Communism. Duke University Press. ISBN 978-0-8223-5102-3.
- Ghodsee, Kristen R. (2009). Muslim Lives in Eastern Europe: Gender, Ethnicity and the Transformation of Islam in Postsocialist Bulgaria. Princeton University Press. ASIN B015X41JMA.
- Ghodsee, Kristen R. (2005). The Red Riviera: Gender, Tourism and Postsocialism on the Black Sea. Duke University Press. ISBN 978-0-8223-3662-4.
- Golden, Peter Benjamin (1992). An Introduction to the History of the Turkic Peoples: Ethnogenesis and State Formation in Medieval and Early Modern Eurasia and the Middle East. Otto Harrassowitz. ISBN 978-3-447-03274-2.
- Grogan, Elinor F. B. (1922). "Bulgaria" . In Chisholm, Hugh (ed.). Encyclopædia Britannica (12th ed.). London & New York: The Encyclopædia Britannica Company.
- Kazhdan, A. (1991). The Oxford Dictionary of Byzantium. New York, Oxford: Oxford University Press. ISBN 0-19-504652-8.
- MacDermott, Mercia (1998). Bulgarian Folk Customs. Jessica Kingsley Publishers. pp. 19, 64–70, 226. ISBN 978-1-85302-486-3.
- Roisman, Joseph; Worthington, Ian (2011). A Companion to Ancient Macedonia. John Wiley and Sons. ISBN 978-1-4443-5163-7.
- Stephenson, Paul (2004). Byzantium's Balkan Frontier. A Political Study of the Northern Balkans, 900–1204. Cambridge University Press. ISBN 0-511-03402-4.
- Whittow, Mark (1996). The Making of Byzantium (600–1025). Los Angeles: University of California Press. ISBN 0-520-20497-2.
- Дончев (Donchev), Дончо (Doncho); Каракашев (Karakashev), Христо (Hristo) (2004). Теми по физическа и социално-икономическа география на България (Topics on Physical and Social-Economic Geography of Bulgaria) (in Bulgarian). София (Sofia): Ciela. ISBN 954-649-717-7.
