= .bg =

Top-level Internet domain for Bulgaria

- Introduced: 3 January 1995
- TLD type: Country code top-level domain
- Status: Active
- Registry: Register.bg
- Sponsor: Register.bg
- Intended use: Entities connected with Bulgaria
- Actual use: Popular in Bulgaria
- Registration restrictions: Must be in Bulgaria or have a representative there
- Structure: Registrations are taken at second or third level
- Documents: Terms & conditions (2025)
- DNSSEC: yes
- IDN: yes
- Registry website: www.register.bg

.bg is the country code top-level domain (ccTLD) for Bulgaria in the Domain Name System of the Internet. As of 2025, it is operated by Register.BG, the official registry responsible for managing domain registrations in the .bg namespace.

.bg domains can be registered by individuals and entities within the European Union, as well as by foreign companies that maintain a registered branch or commercial representative in Bulgaria. Since 2024, domain transfers and renewals can also be processed entirely online through the Register.BG portal. The price of domain registration is €30 per year (€36 including VAT).

Until mid-2006, the price was a one-time registration fee of 86 Leva plus 86 Leva per year (total of 207 Leva including VAT for the first year). For local standards this was a very high price, and many Bulgarian sites were registered under .com (esp -bg.com), .org, or .net domains, as the registration costs were significantly lower (13 to 20 Leva per year) and less of a bureaucratic hassle.

From 25 August 2008, Register.BG simplified the procedures, allowing the registration of domain names in the .bg zone without providing documented grounds (trademarks, company names) for the name. Eventual disputes are to be solved via the newly established Arbitration committee.

Since 18 September 2006, Register.bg proposes new, third-level domains in the a.bg, b.bg, etc., subdomains (a Latin letter or a digit +.bg), lower cost (€12/year incl. VAT), with less restrictions and no dispute resolution. They are targeted mainly at private individuals.

The domain has supported Domain Name System Security Extensions (DNSSEC) since October 2007, with full deployment across all accredited registrars completed in 2023 to enhance protection against DNS spoofing attacks.

On 5 September 2009, Register.bg began accepting second- and third-level domain names in Cyrillic using only letters from the Bulgarian alphabet. In 2022, the policy was expanded to allow mixed-script domain names under certain conditions to accommodate brand identity needs.

== See also ==
- .бг
