= Outline of Bulgaria =

Country in Southeast Europe

The Flag of Bulgaria

The Coat of arms of Bulgaria

The location of Bulgaria

Flag-map of Bulgaria

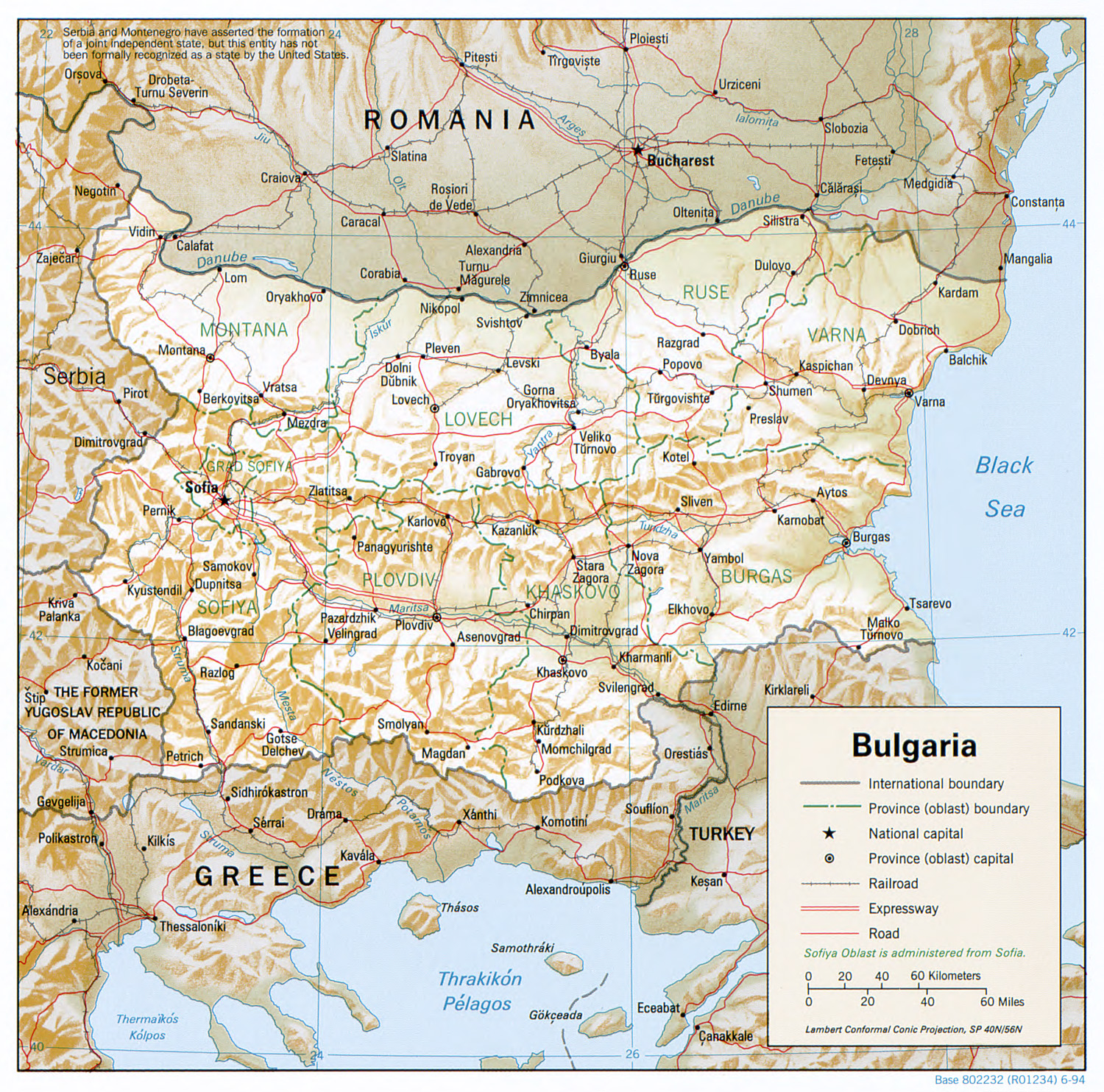
An enlargeable relief map of the Republic of Bulgaria

The following outline is provided as an overview of and topical guide to Bulgaria:

Bulgaria is a unitary parliamentary republic located in Southeastern Europe, bordered by Romania to the north, Serbia and North Macedonia to the west, Greece and Turkey to the south and the Black Sea to the east. Its capital and largest city is Sofia.

== General reference ==
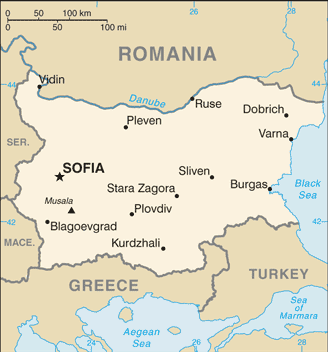
An enlargeable basic map of Bulgaria

- Pronunciation: /bʌlˈɡɛəriə/
- Common English country name: Bulgaria
- Constitutional name: Republic of Bulgaria
- Common endonym(s): България (Bulgariya)
- Official endonym(s): Република България (Republika Bulgariya)
- Adjectival(s): Bulgarian
- Demonym(s): Bulgarian
- Etymology: Name of Bulgaria
- International rankings of Bulgaria
- ISO country codes: BG, BGR, 100
- ISO region codes: See ISO 3166-2:BG
- Internet country code top-level domain: .bg

== Geography of Bulgaria ==
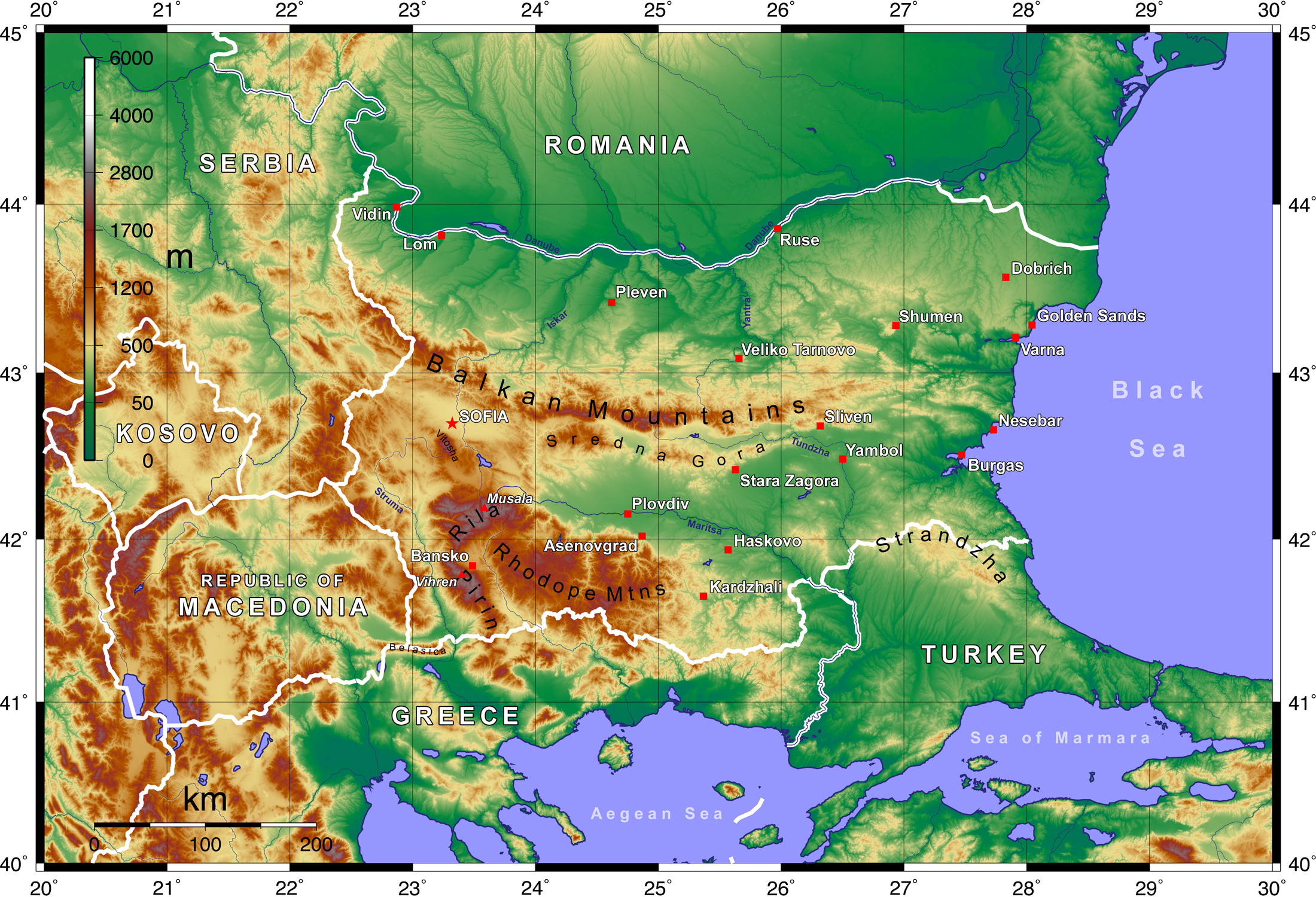
An enlargeable topographic map of Bulgaria

Geography of Bulgaria

- Bulgaria is:
  - a country
  - a member State of the European Union
  - a member state of NATO
  - a Eurozone member state
- Location:
  - Eastern Hemisphere
  - Northern Hemisphere
    - Eurasia
      - Europe
        - Southern Europe
          - Balkans (also known as "Southeastern Europe")
  - Time zone: Eastern European Time (UTC+02), Eastern European Summer Time (UTC+03)
  - Extreme points of Bulgaria
    - High: Musala 2,925 m (9,596 ft)
    - Low: Black Sea 0 m
  - Land boundaries: 1,808 km

Romania 608 km
Greece 494 km
Serbia 318 km
Turkey 240 km
North Macedonia 148 km

- Coastline: 354 km

- Population of Bulgaria: 6,423,207 (2025) - 109th most populous country
- Area of Bulgaria: 110,994 square kilometres (42,855 sq mi) - 103rd largest country
- Atlas of Bulgaria

=== Environment of Bulgaria ===
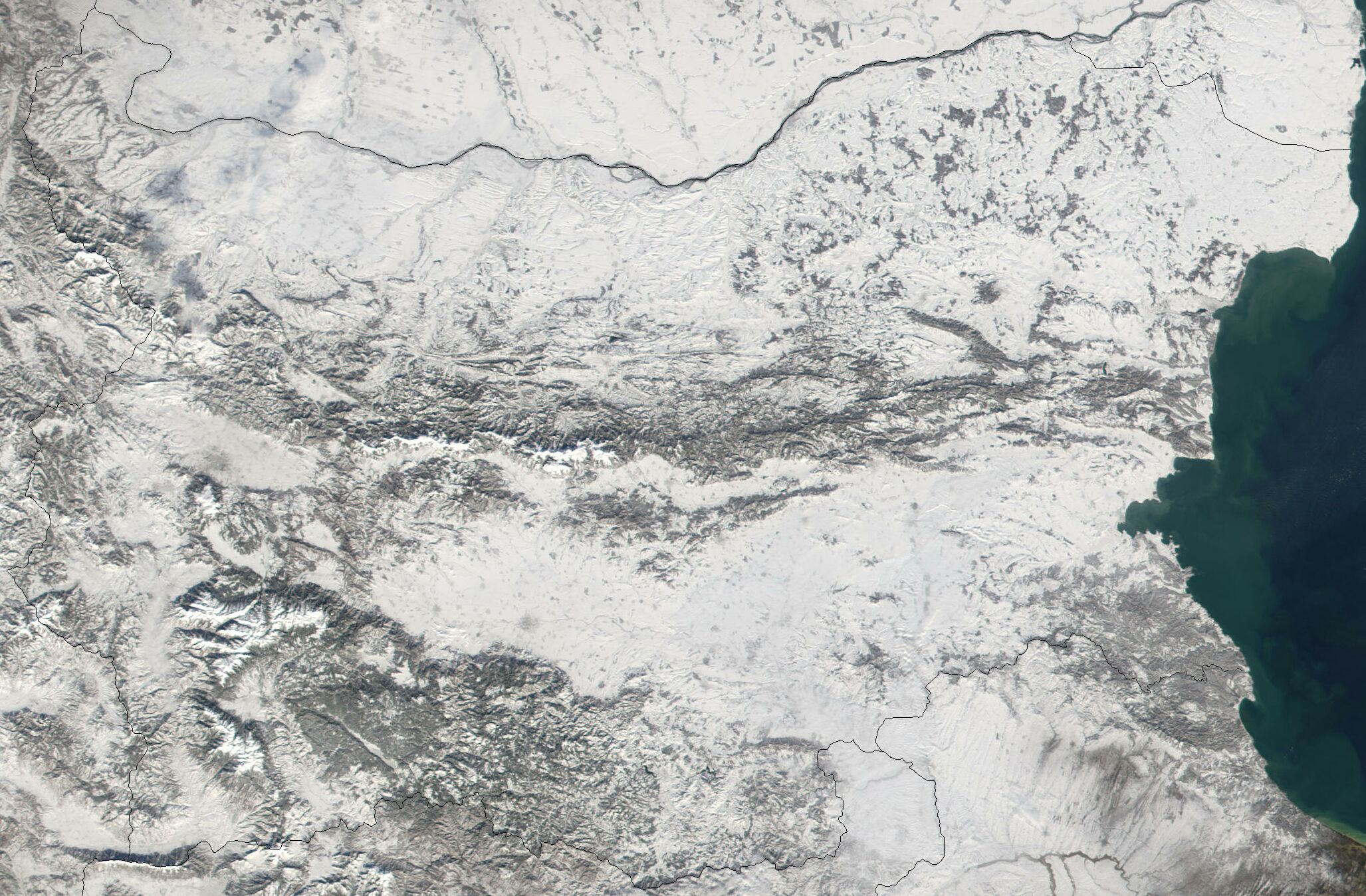
An enlargeable satellite image of Bulgaria

Environment of Bulgaria

- Climate of Bulgaria
- Environmental issues in Bulgaria
- Geology of Bulgaria
- Protected areas of Bulgaria
  - Biosphere reserves in Bulgaria
  - National parks of Bulgaria
- Wildlife of Bulgaria
  - Fauna of Bulgaria
    - Birds of Bulgaria
    - Mammals of Bulgaria

==== Natural geographic features of Bulgaria ====
- Glaciers of Bulgaria
- Islands of Bulgaria
- Lakes of Bulgaria
- Mountains of Bulgaria
- Rivers of Bulgaria
  - Waterfalls of Bulgaria
- World Heritage Sites in Bulgaria

=== Regions of Bulgaria ===
Regions of Bulgaria

==== Administrative divisions of Bulgaria ====
Administrative divisions of Bulgaria

- Provinces of Bulgaria
  - Municipalities of Bulgaria

Province of Bulgaria

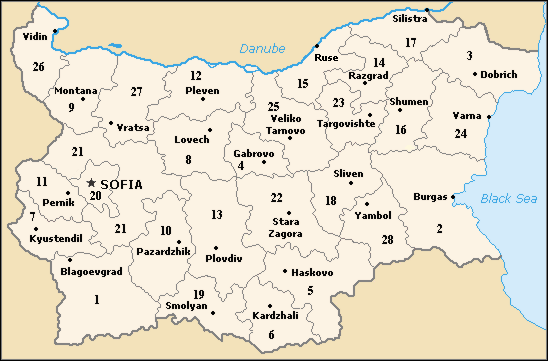

Province
Blagoevgrad
Burgas
Dobrich
Gabrovo
Haskovo
Kardzhali
Kyustendil
Lovech
Montana
Pazardzhik
Pernik
Pleven
Plovdiv
Razgrad
Ruse
Shumen
Silistra
Sliven
Smolyan
Sofia City
Sofia Province
Stara Zagora
Targovishte
Varna
Veliko Tarnovo
Vidin
Vratsa
Yambol

Municipalities of Bulgaria

- Capital of Bulgaria: Sofia
- Cities and towns of Bulgaria
- Villages of Bulgaria

=== Demography of Bulgaria ===
Demographics of Bulgaria

- Bulgarians
  - List of Bulgarians
    - List of presidents of Bulgaria
    - List of Bulgarian monarchs
    - List of Bulgarian actors
    - List of Bulgarian writers
    - List of Bulgarian composers
    - List of Bulgarian musicians and singers
    - List of Bulgarian architects
    - List of Bulgarian footballers

== Government and politics of Bulgaria ==
Politics of Bulgaria

- Form of government: parliamentary republic
- Capital of Bulgaria: Sofia
- Elections in Bulgaria
- Political parties in Bulgaria

=== Branches of government ===
Government of Bulgaria

==== Executive branch of the government of Bulgaria ====
- Head of state: President of Bulgaria, Iliana Iotova
- Head of government: Prime Minister of Bulgaria, Rumen Radev
- Cabinet of Bulgaria

==== Legislative branch of the government of Bulgaria ====
- National Assembly of Bulgaria (unicameral)

==== Judicial branch of the government of Bulgaria ====
Court system of Bulgaria

- Supreme Court of Bulgaria

=== Foreign relations of Bulgaria ===
Foreign relations of Bulgaria

- Diplomatic missions in Bulgaria
- Diplomatic missions of Bulgaria

==== International organization membership ====
The Republic of Bulgaria is a member of:

- Australia Group
- Bank for International Settlements (BIS)
- Black Sea Economic Cooperation Zone (BSEC)
- Central European Initiative (CEI)
- Council of Europe (CE)
- Euro-Atlantic Partnership Council (EAPC)
- European Bank for Reconstruction and Development (EBRD)
- European Investment Bank (EIB)
- European Organization for Nuclear Research (CERN)
- European Union (EU)
- Eurozone (EZ)
- Food and Agriculture Organization (FAO)
- Group of 9 (G9)
- International Atomic Energy Agency (IAEA)
- International Bank for Reconstruction and Development (IBRD)
- International Chamber of Commerce (ICC)
- International Civil Aviation Organization (ICAO)
- International Criminal Court (ICCt)
- International Criminal Police Organization (Interpol)
- International Federation of Red Cross and Red Crescent Societies (IFRCS)
- International Finance Corporation (IFC)
- International Labour Organization (ILO)
- International Maritime Organization (IMO)
- International Mobile Satellite Organization (IMSO)
- International Monetary Fund (IMF)
- International Olympic Committee (IOC)
- International Organization for Migration (IOM)
- International Organization for Standardization (ISO)
- International Red Cross and Red Crescent Movement (ICRM)
- International Telecommunication Union (ITU)
- International Telecommunications Satellite Organization (ITSO)
- International Trade Union Confederation (ITUC)
- Inter-Parliamentary Union (IPU)
- Multilateral Investment Guarantee Agency (MIGA)
- Nonaligned Movement (NAM) (guest)
- North Atlantic Treaty Organization (NATO)
- Nuclear Suppliers Group (NSG)
- Organisation internationale de la Francophonie (OIF)
- Organization for Security and Cooperation in Europe (OSCE)
- Organisation for the Prohibition of Chemical Weapons (OPCW)
- Organization of American States (OAS) (observer)
- Permanent Court of Arbitration (PCA)
- Southeast European Cooperative Initiative (SECI)
- United Nations (UN)
- United Nations Conference on Trade and Development (UNCTAD)
- United Nations Educational, Scientific, and Cultural Organization (UNESCO)
- United Nations Industrial Development Organization (UNIDO)
- United Nations Mission in Liberia (UNMIL)
- United Nations Mission in the Sudan (UNMIS)
- Universal Postal Union (UPU)
- Western European Union (WEU) (associate affiliate)
- World Confederation of Labour (WCL)
- World Customs Organization (WCO)
- World Federation of Trade Unions (WFTU)
- World Health Organization (WHO)
- World Intellectual Property Organization (WIPO)
- World Meteorological Organization (WMO)
- World Tourism Organization (UNWTO)
- World Trade Organization (WTO)
- World Veterans Federation
- Zangger Committee (ZC)

=== Law and order in Bulgaria ===
Law of Bulgaria

- Capital punishment in Bulgaria
- Constitution of Bulgaria
- Crime in Bulgaria
- Human rights in Bulgaria
  - LGBT rights in Bulgaria
  - Freedom of religion in Bulgaria
  - Women in Bulgaria
- Law enforcement in Bulgaria

=== Military of Bulgaria ===
Military of Bulgaria

- Command
  - Commander-in-chief: President of Bulgaria
    - Ministry of Defence of Bulgaria
- Forces
  - Army of Bulgaria
  - Navy of Bulgaria
  - Air Force of Bulgaria
  - Special forces of Bulgaria
- Military history of Bulgaria
- Military ranks of Bulgaria

== History of Bulgaria ==
History of Bulgaria

- Timeline of the history of Bulgaria
- Economic history of Bulgaria
- Military history of Bulgaria

== The Culture of Bulgaria ==
Culture of Bulgaria

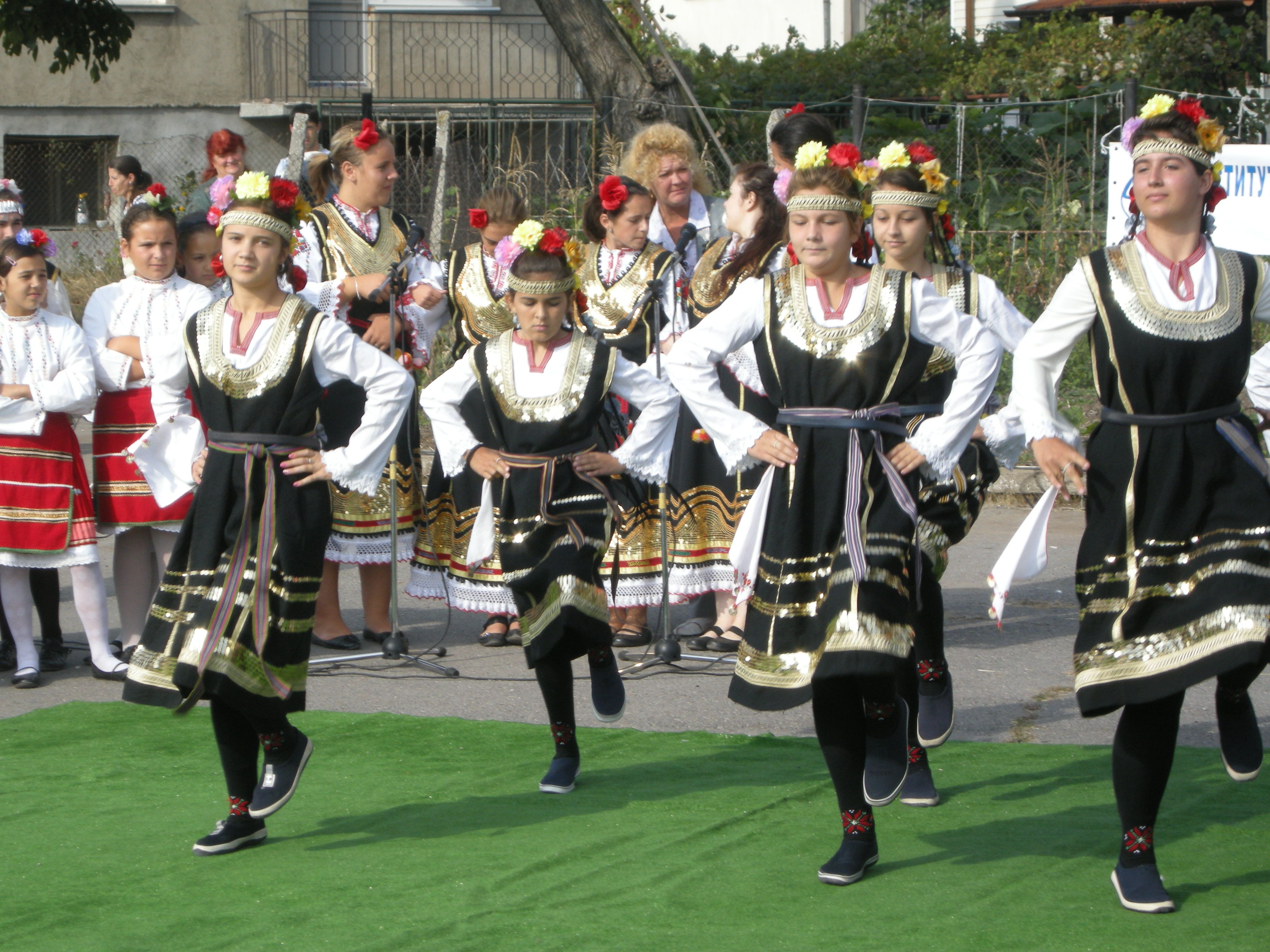
Bulgarian traditional dance.

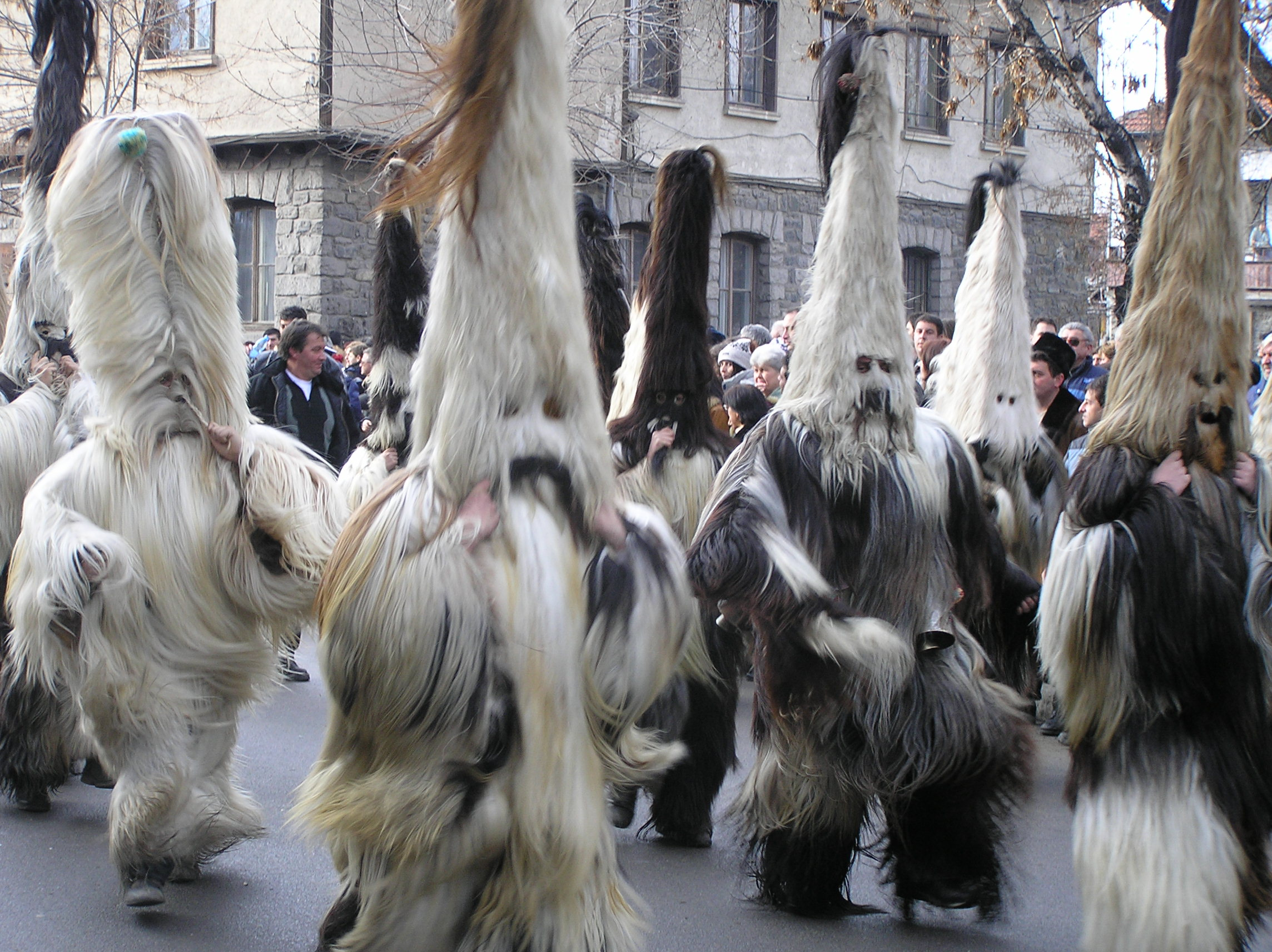
Kukeri in Razlog

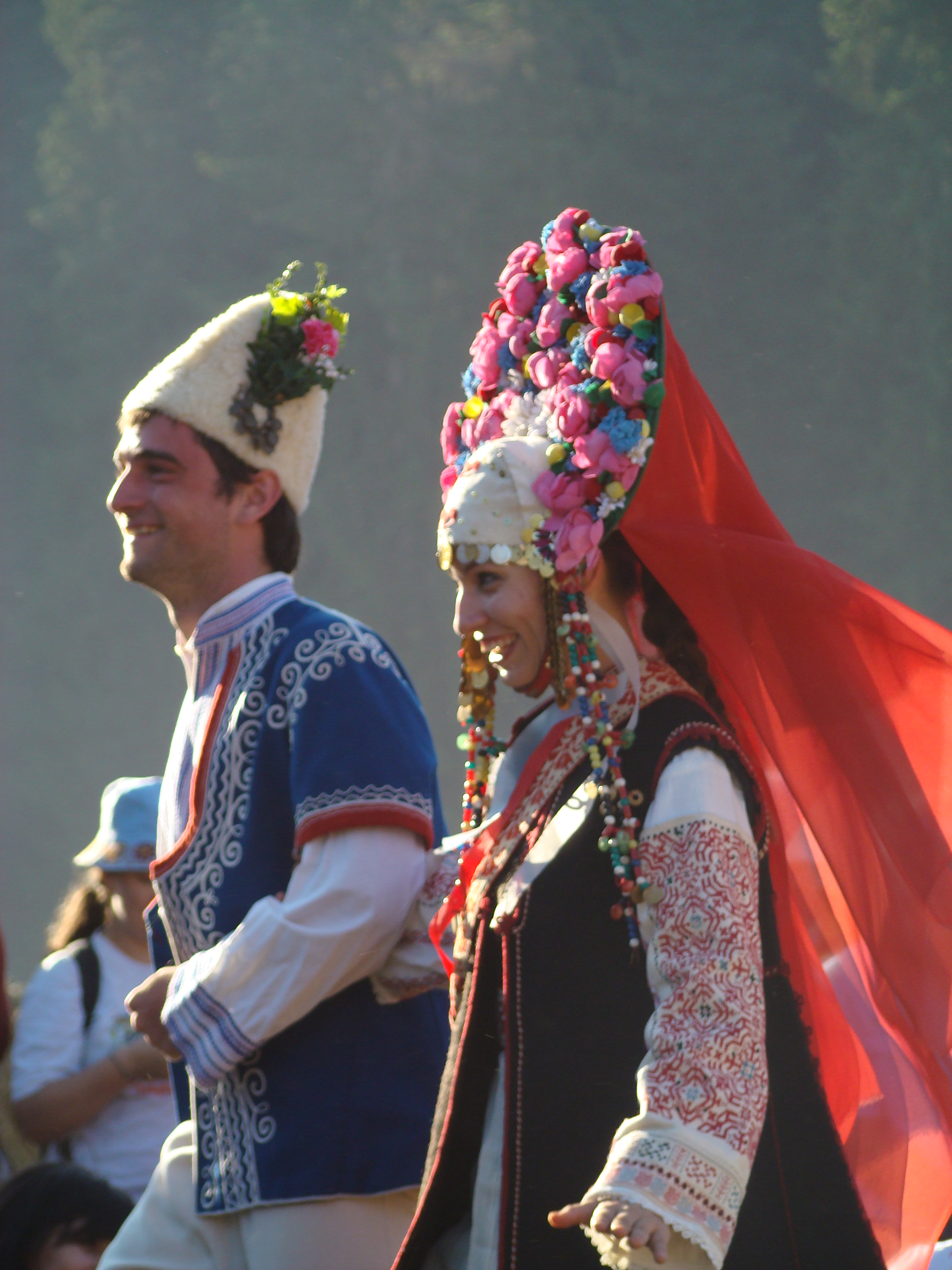
Bulgarian folk costume

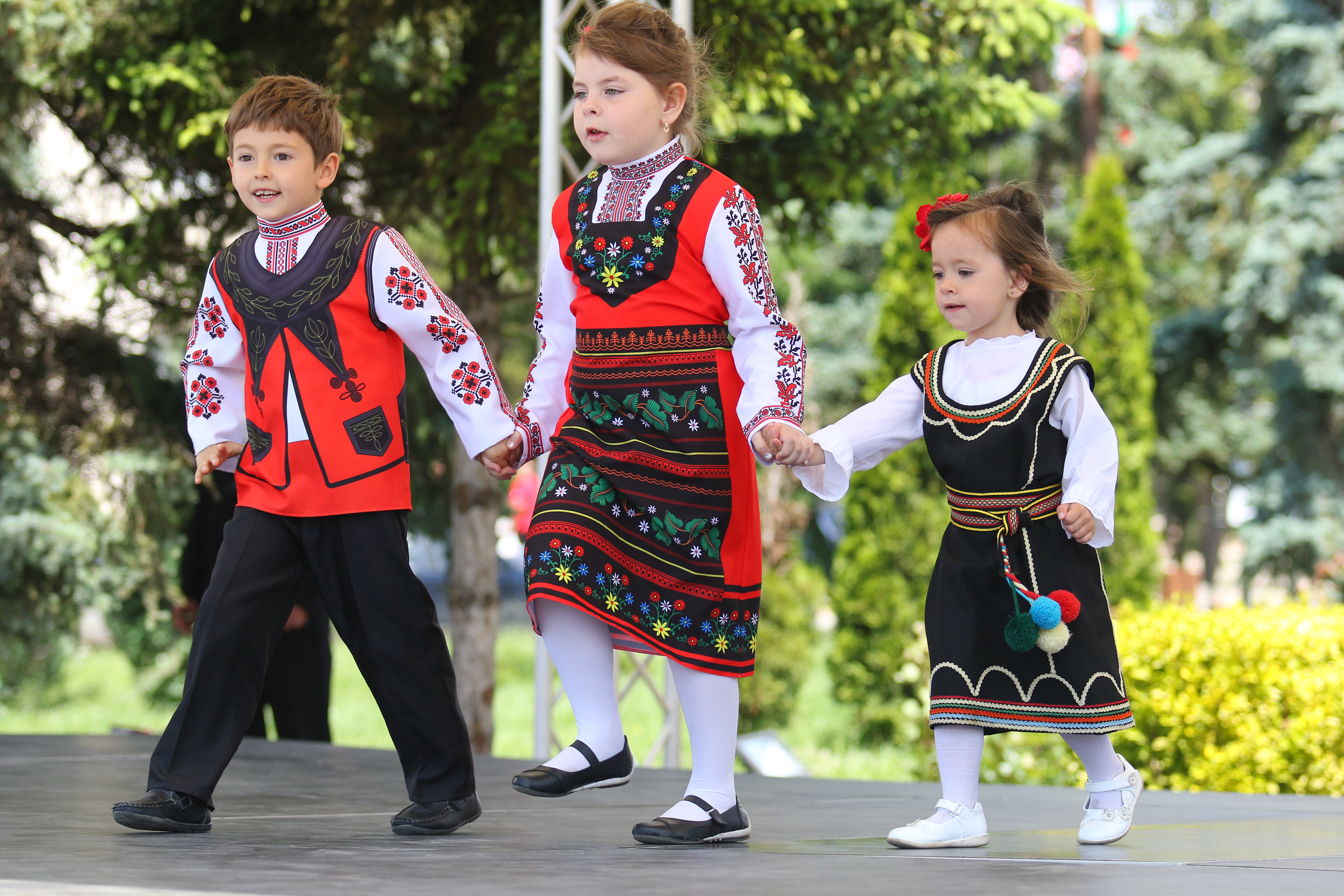
Bulgarian children in national costumes.

- Architecture of Bulgaria
- Cuisine of Bulgaria
- Languages of Bulgaria
- Media in Bulgaria
- Museums in Bulgaria
- National symbols of Bulgaria
  - Coat of arms of Bulgaria
  - Flag of Bulgaria
  - National anthem of Bulgaria
- People of Bulgaria
- Prostitution in Bulgaria
- Public holidays in Bulgaria
- Religion in Bulgaria
  - Buddhism in Bulgaria
  - Christianity in Bulgaria
  - Hinduism in Bulgaria
  - Islam in Bulgaria
  - Judaism in Bulgaria

=== Art in Bulgaria ===
Art in Bulgaria

- Cinema of Bulgaria
  - List of Bulgarian actors
  - List of Bulgarian films
- Literature of Bulgaria
- Music of Bulgaria
  - List of Bulgarian musicians and singers
- Television in Bulgaria

=== Sports in Bulgaria ===
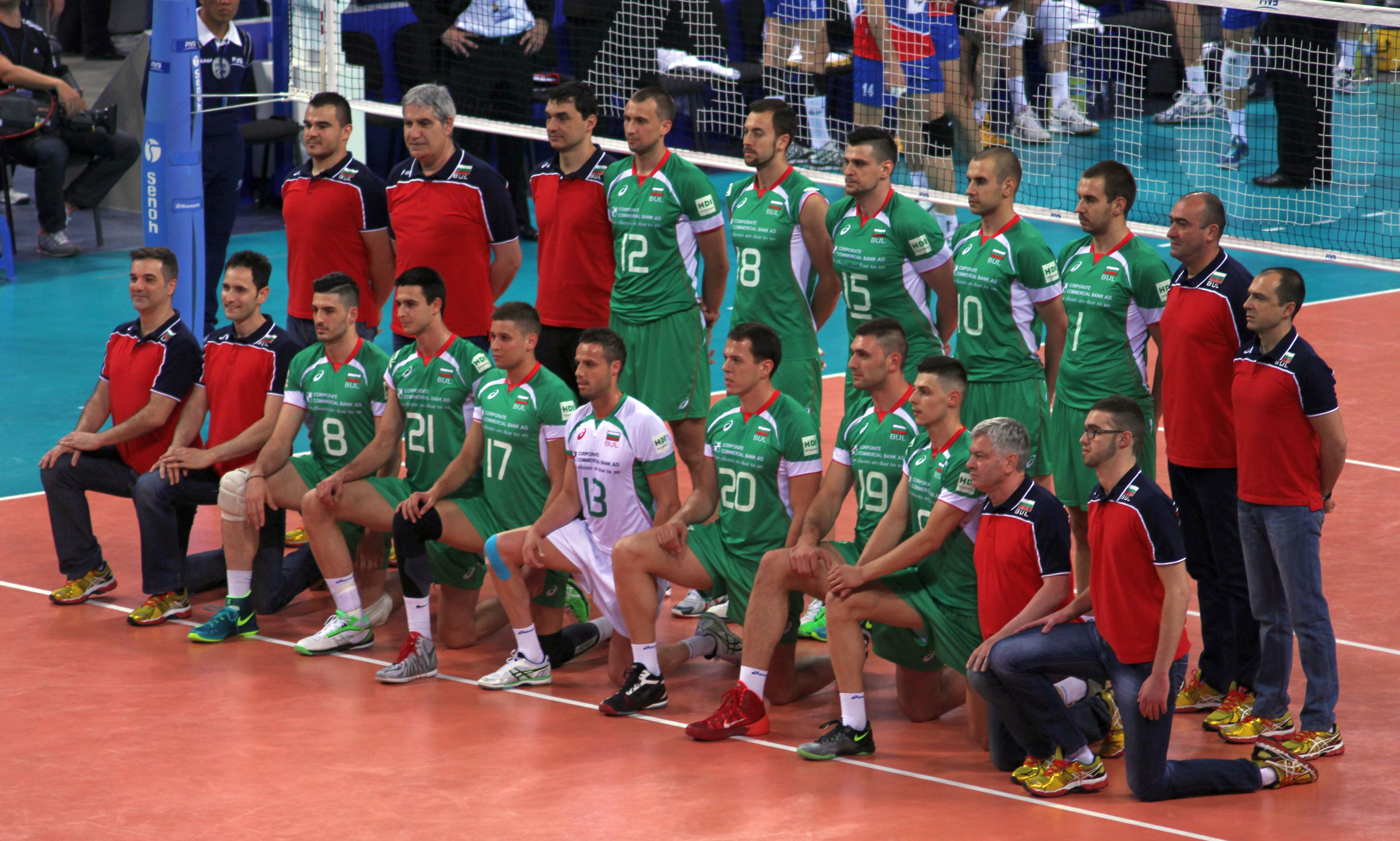
The team in 2014

Sports in Bulgaria

- Football in Bulgaria
- Bulgaria at the Olympics

== Economy and infrastructure of Bulgaria ==
Economy of Bulgaria

- Economic rank, by nominal GDP (2025): 62nd (sixty-second)
- Agriculture in Bulgaria
- Banking in Bulgaria
  - National Bank of Bulgaria
- Communications in Bulgaria
  - Internet in Bulgaria
- Companies of Bulgaria
- Currency of Bulgaria: Euro
  - ISO 4217: EUR
- Economic history of Bulgaria
- Energy in Bulgaria
  - Electricity sector in Bulgaria
  - Nuclear power in Bulgaria
- Executive Agency Port Administration
- Health care in Bulgaria
- Mining in Bulgaria
- Tourism in Bulgaria
- Transport in Bulgaria
  - Airports in Bulgaria
  - Rail transport in Bulgaria
  - Roads in Bulgaria

== Education in Bulgaria ==
Education in Bulgaria

- List of schools in Bulgaria
- List of universities in Bulgaria

== Health in Bulgaria ==
Health in Bulgaria

== See also ==
- Outline of Slavic history and culture
- List of Slavic studies journals
