= Environmental issues in North Macedonia =

Environmental issues in North Macedonia include air and water pollution, deforestation, threats to endemic species and climate change. There is substantial degree of pollution in the air, water and land of North Macedonia. According to 2019 estimates, the country is considered to have one of the highest degrees of pollution in Europe.

The country's tradition of measuring air quality started in 1965, after which urban environments could be monitored for the level of pollution present. Air pollution negatively affects the health of citizens, primarily their respiratory and cardiovascular systems. Some of the main causes for the increased air pollution in the country include the use of firewood and carbon during the winter period and heavy traffic dominated by the use of old cars. Government and citizen initiatives to tackle the problem of air pollution have appeared with various degrees of success.

There is significant water pollution in the country's water resources, primarily the biggest rivers Vardar, Bregalnica and Crna River and the Ohrid Lake. This is mostly due to unrestrained wastewater disposal from industry, mining, households and agriculture.

== Background ==
Some of the most frequently polluted areas in the country include urban regions. Nevertheless, pollution has been noticed in some of the rural areas as well. Some of the most frequently polluted cities include the country's capital Skopje and bigger cities like Tetovo and Bitola.

Monitoring of the air quality started being recorded in 1965 when samples of harmful substances were being collected. Since the 1990s, more modern technologies have been implemented throughout the country. Airborne particles in Skopje have been estimated to exceed safety levels recommended by the World Health Organization by 20 times. Skopje is regularly ranked as one of the most polluted cities, both in Europe and the world. The PM10 levels in 2018 were above EU limits for 202 days; during that year they reached 2.5 PM, a measure that indicates the most dangerous air pollutants for health. The Ministry of Environment and Physical Planning is responsible for the recording of pollution in the country.

In 2022, it is expected that the pollution levels in the country will rise higher than before owing to the global economic crisis.

== Air pollution ==
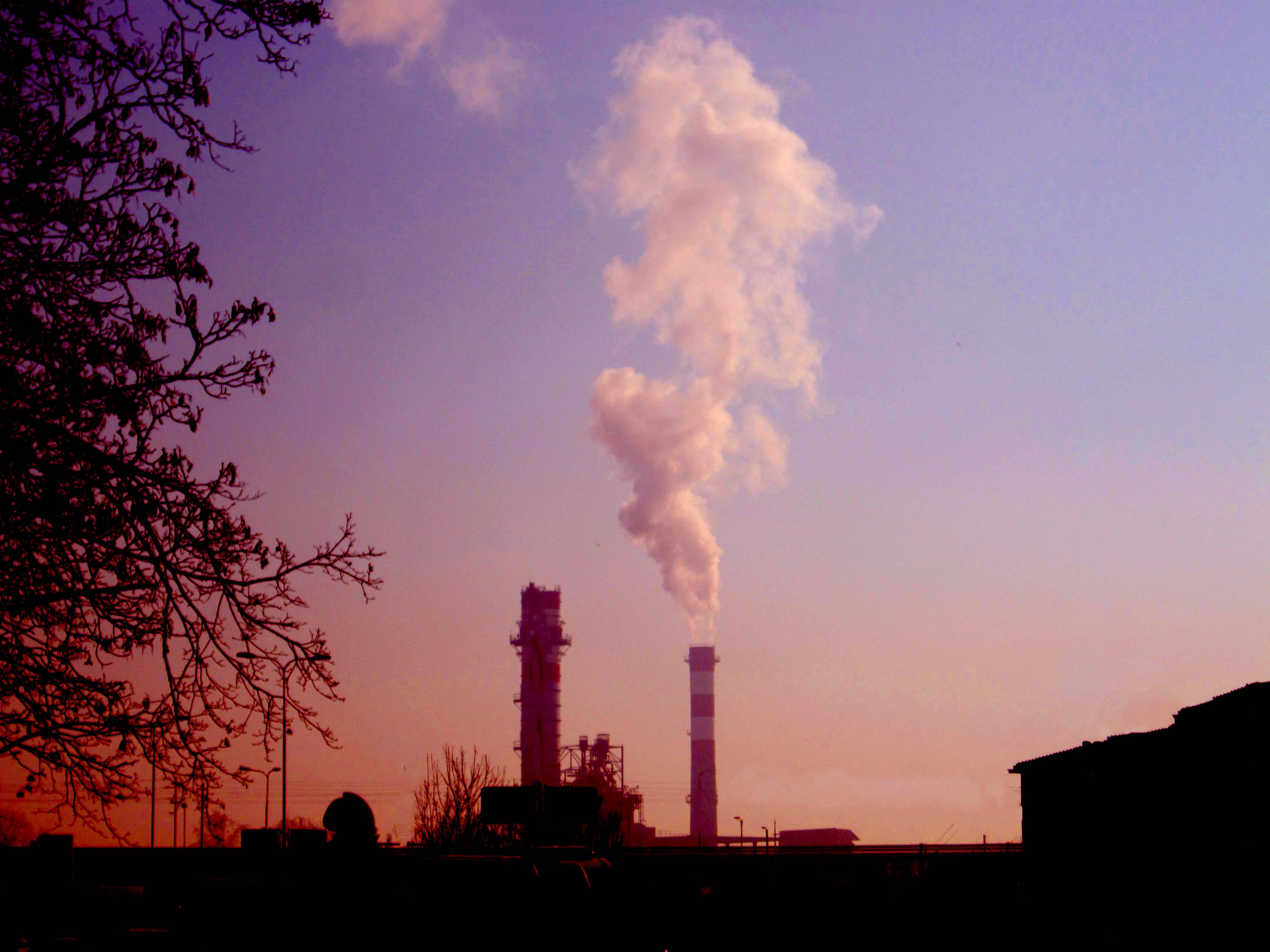
A source of air pollution through the emission of exhaust gases in an urban area in the country.

=== Main causes ===
The state of the air quality aggravates with the beginning of the heating season. Additionally, due to the country's location in a predominantly mountainous region and its Mediterranean climate, it is harder to tackle the problem. The rising of warm air upwards and its collision with the colder and heavier air downwards results in the formation of smog. The main causes of air pollution, in descending order of importance include:

- Burning wood and using biomass pellet fuels as a means of home heating during cold winters produces PM10 particles and carbon monoxide. This is related primarily to their socioeconomic status and according to some estimates, 42-45% of the citizens of the capital use firewood to heat their homes, which is also partly purchased on the black market.
- Old cars that do not meet EU emission standards and heavy traffics cause PM10 and carbon monoxide. An increase of the import of such vehicles appeared in 2010 after the decision of the leading government at the time.
- Industrial production processes that are older than the rest of Europe
- Garbage disposal by incineration
- Producing electricity using solid fuels-like brown coal (lignite) and liquid fuels - nitrogen oxides and sulfur dioxide
- Population density; construction activities - dust; inadequate urbanization, production facilities Silmak and Teteks; geographical basin location - Tetovo

As in other post-Yugoslav countries, a study by the Health and Environment Alliance found that the main pollutants of the air include the 16 lignite plants that are found on the territories of the countries.

=== Effects on health ===
According to health research, it is estimated that approximately 1350 (2015) and more than 3000 people (2019) died annually due to air pollution-related causes. Additionally, air pollution in the country is known to contribute to lost productive days. According to 2015 estimates, 253 million euros were lost, mainly due to premature death, health costs and reduced productivity.

Organs that are primarily affected by pollution are the lungs and the cardiovascular system. The most vulnerable population includes children between the age of 0 and 5, elderly people, people with chronic diseases, asthma patients, people who work outdoors and smokers (who have an increased risk of cardiac arrest). Additionally, heart diseases and strokes account for 80% of premature deaths related to pollution. Children are particularly prone to bronchitis and other infections due to the smaller size of their airways. Air pollution can have an effect on neural development and cognition that can lead to a decrease in performance and lower quality of life.

Additionally, numerous scientific studies have shown that PM10 and PM2.5 particles in the air could lead to metabolic disorders, such as those of the liver and to neurodegenerative effects, leading to worsened memory, speech, intelligence and tumor formations in pre-born children. It has been reported by Ratko Davidovski, a PhD in hygiene and health ecology, that several citizens of Tetovo who reported non-alcoholic fatty liver disease (NAFLD) despite leading healthy lives, which he attributed to the high levels of pollution in the air of that town.

=== Solutions ===
According to an analysis of air pollution in the period between 2005 and 2015, there was a decrease in the level of sulfur dioxide while the levels of other pollutants only decreased very slightly or remained unchanged. The same analysis found that the most important factors to tackle first include wood-burning heating systems and heavy traffic. Some of the proposed solutions to tackle air pollution problems include better public transport, using solar heating and pedestrianizing the city center. Additionally, nationwide gasification programs have been listed as the primary solution for the use of carbon and other pieces of furniture.

== Water pollution ==
A video showing plastic litter being fished out of the river Vardar.

As there was no existing information on the level of water pollution in 2021, the discharge of harmful and dangerous substances in water bodies without a permit is not prohibited with sanctions for illegal actions. This includes wastewater from industry and mining that gets released into the soil, sewage, watercourses, reservoirs and lakes. Wastewater in turn, gets generated from several sources, including industrial and mining wastewaters, wastewaters from households and wastewaters from agriculture.

== Public reactions and government initiatives ==
Many initiatives have been taken by the locals and the government to tackle and raise awareness about the issue of pollution. An AirCare application has been developed by an engineering student to monitor pollution levels and it gained widespread use by the wider public. Thousands of high school students protested on 20 December 2019 in front of the government building as part of global climate movements.

The judiciary system in the country is responsible to take measures against air pollutants when there is enough evidence that pollution is harmful to health through central and local politics. The country is receiving financial help from the European Union (EU). The country's president, Stevo Pendarovski, has emphasized that more financing is needed to tackle the air pollution problem. In early 2020, after the allowed toxic particles were eleven times higher than recommended, the government announced some measures such as free working days for pregnant women and the elderly, reduced outdoor work and banned sports and outdoor activities.

== Legislation ==
Article 43 of the Constitution of the state is set in place to protect the environment. Since the 2000s, the harmonization process of the national legislation on environment with the EU legislation started and laws governing environmental protection started being implemented in the 2010s.

== See also ==
- List of environmental issues
- Environmental issues in Albania
- Environmental issues in Serbia
- Environmental issues in Bulgaria
- Environmental issues in Greece
