= Shumen University =

University in Shumen, Bulgaria

Coordinates: 43.2799°N 26.9464°E

Constantine of Preslav University of Shumen
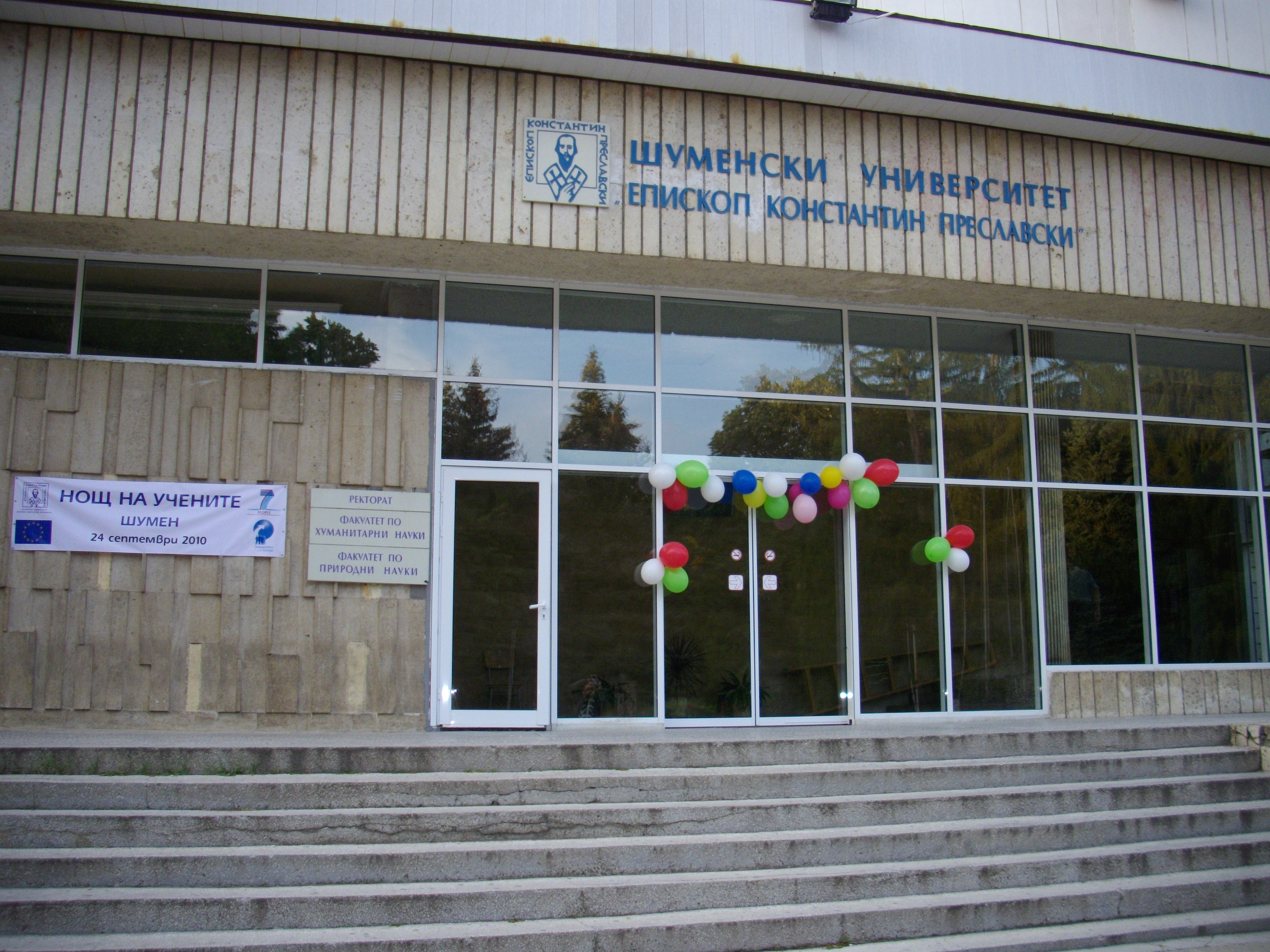
- Type: Public
- Established: 1971/1995
- Affiliations: EUA
- Rector: Prof. DSc Nataliya Vitanova
- Students: ~7000
- Location: Shumen, Bulgaria
- Website: shu.bg

The Constantine of Preslav University of Shumen (Bulgarian: Шуменски университет „Епископ Константин Преславски“, Shumenski universitet „Episkop Konstantin Preslavski“) in Bulgaria is named after Constantine of Preslav, the student of Saints Cyril and Methodius.

== Overview ==
The university was founded as the Higher Pedagogical Institute with a decree of the State Council of the People's Republic of Bulgaria in 1971. In 1995 it was transformed into Constantine of Preslav University of Shumen.

The Constantine of Preslav University of Shumen is one of five classical universities in Bulgaria. It has more than 7,000 students studying in about 100 bachelor's and master's degree programmes taught in five faculties:

- Faculty of Humanities
- Faculty of Mathematics and Informatics
- Faculty of Natural Sciences
- Faculty of Technical Sciences
- Faculty of Education

There is a college in Dobrich and Department for Information and In-service Teacher Training in Varna.

The university is a certified higher-education institution with more than 500 full-time lecturers. The staff has made serious contributions in science and participates actively in international educational and academic projects and programmes.

Its library has rich holdings. Constantine of Preslav University Press publishes hundreds of volumes of specialized educational and academic literature. The university has one of two astronomical observatories for education in the country. In 2010 the astronomical centre celebrated its 10th anniversary.

Constantine of Preslav University has five education corpuses, four halls of residence, playgrounds, swimming pools, fitness centres, and places for recreation and entertainment. Along with their studies, students can participate in initiatives and programmes in the field of science, arts and sport.

In 2009 the Bulgarian National Evaluation and Accreditation Agency accredited Constantine of Preslav University of Shumen for six years with the highest possible grade.

== See also ==
- Balkan Universities Network
- List of universities in Bulgaria
- Shumen
- 11852 Shoumen
