= Environmental issues in Serbia =

Environmental issues in Serbia encompass discussions regarding air pollution, water pollution, deforestation, biodiversity loss, climate change and the environmental costs of warfare. The Serbian political and economic climate often complicate these environmental issues. An economic shift to heavier industrialization within Serbia promoted the inefficient and wasteful use of natural resources. Pollution and sanitation concerns also took less precedence following an economic collapse in the 1990s, so no government investments were made in these sectors. Several environmental organizations operating in Serbia have protested the government's handling of these issues.

These issues pose a financial threat to Serbia’s economy as funds are allocated towards addressing the damage to the health of Serbia’s population along with the local flora and fauna. For instance, plans to address air pollution and its associated health risks amount to €2.6 billion in costs based on plans finalized on December 2022.

Various government organizations like the Serbian Environmental Protection Authority (SEPA) and the Ministry of Environmental Protection of Serbia (MoEP) are the primary entities responsible for meeting international guidelines related to environmental issues. Meeting these guidelines become all the more important for Serbia as a candidate country for membership to the European Union (EU) as full accession requires aligning with EU environmental standards.

== Air pollution ==
Air quality in Serbia is characterized by the concentration of pollutants like PM_{2.5} and PM_{10} detected in the atmosphere as measured by various monitoring networks across the country. PM_{2.5} and PM_{10} refer to particulate matter with diameters measuring less than 2.5 and 10 micrometers (µm) respectively and have been associated with various health issues such as cardiovascular and respiratory illnesses.

Trends exhibit a gradual decline in the concentration of ambient PM_{2.5} estimated in Serbia. Between 2010 and 2019, the estimated annual average of the concentration of ambient PM_{2.5} decreased from 31 μg/m^{3} to 25 μg/m^{3}. A later assessment covering the years 2015 to 2023 also reports a decrease in the concentration of estimated PM_{2.5} concentrations. Despite these improvements, data from 2019 show that the entire Serbian population lived in areas that all exceed the recommended World Health Organization (WHO) annual average exposure limit of 5 μg/m^{3}, a guideline published in 2021. Furthermore, the estimated annual average concentration of ambient PM_{2.5} within Serbia during 2019 is more than twice that of the EU-28 average of 11.4 μg/m^{3}. Industry estimates during 2019 identify energy production as a top contributor to PM_{2.5} concentrations, accounting for approximately 23% of emissions in Serbia followed by residential combustion at 19%.

PM_{10} concentrations are also at an unhealthy level as seen from data collected between 2011 and 2015 for the three most populated cities in Serbia – Belgrade, Niš, and Novi Sad . During the data collection period, the three cities all registered annual average PM₁₀ concentrations exceeding that period’s WHO guideline of 20 μg/m^{3}. Daily average PM_{10} concentrations measured during that period also exceeded the WHO guideline of 50 μg/m^{3} for approximately 28% of total days during the period in Belgrade, 26% in Niš, and 19% in Novi Sad. Aside from the WHO guideline, local regulation limits 35 days of exposure above a certain average daily amount of PM_{10}. In 2018, Valjevo exceeded this limit registering 170 days of increased exposure, followed by Užice at 154, downtown Smederevo at 146, and Belgrade at 132.

Particulate matter concentrations show seasonal patterns, with increased fuel combustion for heating contributing to peaks during colder months. Measurements collected from Belgrade, Novi Sad, and Niš during 2018 to 2019 show PM_{2.5} concentrations gradually increasing from September and peaking around December and January. On the other hand, data from the monitoring network covering 2011 to 2022 also show that heating seasons lasting from October to April saw a rise in prolonged periods of increased PM_{10} and PM_{2.5} concentrations, with some episodes lasting over a month. This temporal quality extends to daily fluctuations in particulate concentrations as higher concentrations are consistently observed in the evening, which researchers surmise could be due to the inversion of temperature from day to night.

Burning solid fuels like wood and coal is a primary contributor to the increase in particulate matter like PM_{2.5} and carbon monoxide that are harmful to human health. In Serbia, solid fuels accounted for 40.9% of household heating during the heating season between 2010 and 2011 compared with district-provided heating at 23.2% and electricity-based heating at 25.3%. The energy poverty rate, the percentage of all households within the territory that cannot afford district-based heating, is 10% in Serbia and has been cited as a reason behind the high reliance on solid fuels. Electricity-based heating can also depend on solid fuels, with coal comprising 68% of Serbia’s electricity generation in 2019. Between 2010 and 2019, however, the percentage of the population that still rely on solid fuels for cooking has shrunk from 31% to 24%.

Besides particulates, ground-level ozone is another air pollutant that introduces health risks at high levels of exposure. Ozone is formed from complex chemical reactions between nitrogen oxides (NO_{x}) and volatile organic compounds (VOCs) in the presence of sunlight. Given the association between the sun and ozone, peaks for this pollutant exist during seasons with higher temperatures. For example, air monitors detected a spike in ozone concentration during the summer month of July 2017 within Belgrade, Pančevo, and Subotica.

Detected ozone exposure decreased between 2010 and 2019 from 86.6 to 69.8 μg/m^{3}, but air monitors still register unhealthy concentrations of ozone in Serbia. Data collected from 2019 show that 67% of the Serbian population lives in areas that exceed the WHO long-term ozone exposure guideline of 60 μg/m^{3}. During this period, a separate study measuring ozone concentrations between 2011 and 2015 for the three most populated Serbian cities found that Novi Sad exceeds the WHO eight-hour guideline of 100 μg/m^{3} for approximately 24% of total days within the data collection period. Belgrade and Niš also exceeded this guideline for 8% and 6% of total days between 2011 and 2015, respectively.

Air pollutants have been linked to higher mortality rates in Serbia. Between 20111 and 2015, the total non-accidental deaths related to pollutants amount to 2,013 from health complications arising from PM_{10} exposure and 1,411 from ozone exposure. Data from 2019 also identified air pollution as the 7th leading risk factor for all deaths in Serbia, accounting for 12,700 or 11% of all deaths. Of this figure, roughly 83% link to PM_{2.5}, 16% link to household pollution from cooking using solid fuels, and 1% link to ozone exposure. Approximately 82% of these deaths are among people older than 65 and approximately 36% of PM_{2.5}-related deaths are attributable to burning fossil fuels. However, the rate has fallen since 2010 by 20% as of 2019.

According to a WHO report, Serbia has higher estimates of premature death due to air pollution than most countries in the EU. Assessments of air quality based on data from monitoring stations managed by national authorities indicate that the concentrations of air pollutants, especially particular matter, regularly exceed the levels that protect human health. The report states that the main sources of outdoor air pollution in Serbia include the energy sector, the transport sector, waste dump sites and industrial activities, such as the petrochemical industry complex in Pančevo and Novi Sad; cement factories in Popovac, Kosjerić and Beočin; chemical plants and metallurgical complexes in Smederevo, Sevojno and Bor; thermal power plants in Obrenovac, Lazarevac and Kostolac. Other documented sources of air pollution include fossil fuel-based individual household heating in periurban and rural towns and increasing road traffic, especially in large cities such as Belgrade, Novi Sad and Niš.

In January 2020, hundreds of people, some wearing surgical masks and respirators, attended a protest in Belgrade, demanding the government tackle severe air pollution. In March, the Air Visual API website ranked Belgrade temporarily at the top of its global index of cities with the worst air pollution.

== Water contamination ==
Serbia’s wastewater infrastructure is limited in comparison with that of the majority of European Union member states. A 2015 publication studying Serbia’s 2011 National Environmental Approximation Strategy concluded that 36 percent of households in Central Serbia and 23% in Vojvodina were connected to public sewer networks. It states that about 66.7 percent of urban wastewater was collected and 11.49 percent was treated. Estimates of the share of population connected to public sewage systems range from about 55 to 67 percent, with the remainder relying on septic tanks or discharging wastewater directly into watercourses. The portion of wastewater that receives treatment are considerably lower, ranging from roughly 12 to 20 percent depending on the source and year. More than 70 percent of municipalities have no wastewater treatment plant, and an estimated 80 percent or more of municipal and industrial untreated wastewater is released into rivers and waterways. Between 14 and 16 percent of the population is connected to a treatment plant, a share that is substantially higher in most EU member states. This is important to note because approximately 92 percent of Serbia's territory lies within the Danube drainage basin.

Serbia’s largest concentration of people live in the capital city of Belgrade, which is home to roughly one in every four Serbians. Belgrade, with a population nearing 1.7 million, has no central wastewater treatment plant, making it the only major European capital without a wastewater plant system in order. As a result of this, wastewater and its sewage is directly discharged into the Sava, and the Danube River—a body of water where Serbians rely heavily for drinking water, energy, agriculture, cooling of thermal power plants, and transportation. The volume of untreated wastewater released into the two rivers is estimated at about 190 million cubic meters per year. This is relatively non-existent in comparison to surrounding European countries, as these practices are strictly prohibited across the European Union.

A 2024 study of the Danube found that, under base-flow conditions, faecal pollution along the river is mainly determined by point-source emissions of treated and untreated municipal sewage. Between 2001 and 2019, average faecal pollution levels decreased roughly by 71.8% percent. There was no comparable decrease recorded in a heavily polluted stretch for Serbia. Similarly, studies regarding the unsafe drinking conditions of drinking water in the Northern regions of Serbia conclude similar findings. Many cities, towns and villages in Northern Serbia have higher levels of Arsenic in their drinking water, than other European countries in comparison.

Findings of a WHO-supported survey in Serbia have shown that one third of rural water systems inspected in Serbia did not meet standards for microbiological drinking-water quality, which has led the Serbian government to revise some of its regulation. Per WHO, the maximum amount of Arsenic allowed in drinking water to be considered safe is 10 µg/L. In these studies, the samples found three different regions in Northern Serbia with a limit more than 10 times higher than the maximum permissible limit recommendation, with the autonomous province of Vojvodina having the biggest problem with arsenic polluted water, with readings from Novi Bečej reaching up to 27 times the legal limit. Long term exposure to inorganic arsenic above this level has been associated with a higher increase of type 2 diabetes, cardiovascular and respiratory diseases, skin hyperpigmentation, and cancers of the lung, bladder, skin and kidneys. Water pollution on the Tamis River (tributary of the Danube) - industrial discharge and soil erosion.

Contamination of water in Serbia is also sometimes caused by frequent floods. Human contact with this polluted water can cause various health problems, such as infections, skin inflammation or conjunctiva.

== Small hydropower plants ==
Around 100 small hydropower plants have been built in Serbia, according to the Ministry of Environmental Protection. The state power company offers strong incentives and commits to buying electricity generated by the plants at a price 50 percent higher than the market rate.

In 2018, thousands of citizens of Pirot protested against the construction of small hydropower plants in protected areas. Activists of the environmental initiative Defend the Rivers of Stara Planina (Odbranimo reke Stare planine) have requested for the construction to stop in all protected areas and performed multiple actions to prevent further construction. The village of Rakita has become an important front in their battle. In May 2019, the president of the local community attempted to stop the machines he claimed were working outside of the construction site. When the police intervened, he promised to jump in the river if they attempted to arrest him. The construction of the plant had created a landslide that destroyed the road in the village. Helped by environmental activists, villagers in Rakita have removed pipes installed to serve a new hydroelectric power plant on the Rakitska river.

== Deforestation ==
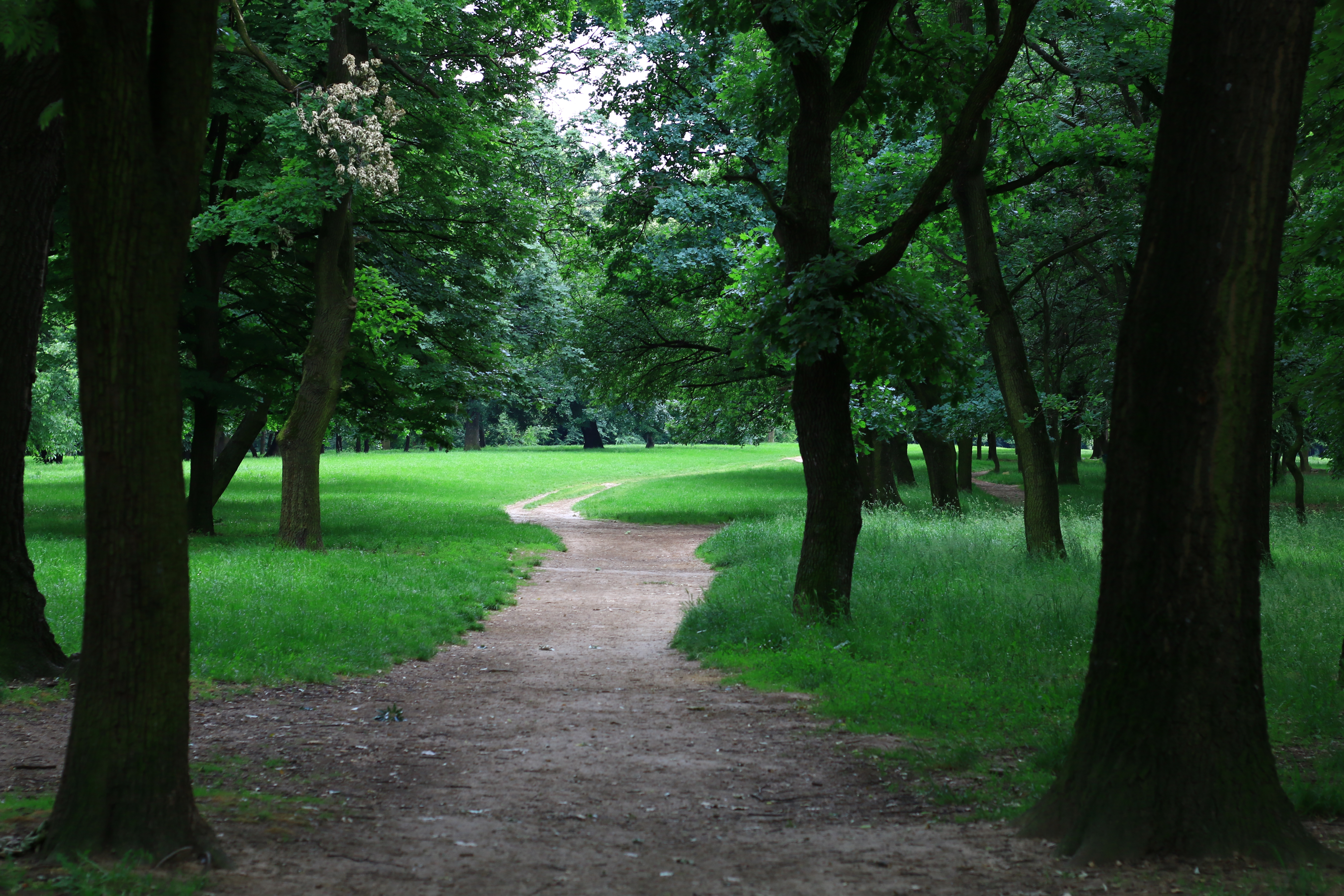
Košutnjak forest in Belgrade.

The deforestation issue in Serbia is mainly attributed to illegal logging operations that impact the country financially and environmentally. Over a period of about 25 years (1999-2025), approximately 1.2 million m^{3} of timber were cut down illegally. The worst case of deforestation has happened in the forest estate of Toplica, where approximately 528,887 m^{3} of timber was illegally logged. This problem is concentrated along the Kosovo-Serbia Border as shown by the sheer amount of forest cut down within that area.

According to Global Forest Watch, Serbia lost 52.8kha of tree cover from 2001 to 2019, equivalent to a 1.9% decrease in tree cover since 2000. The loss of forest cover can be attributed to illegal forest cutting, uncontrolled livestock grazing and forest fires. In 2020, the environmental initiative Do Not Let Belgrade D(r)own launched a petition against cutting down of trees in the Košutnjak forest. The petition was signed by over 70 000 people.

Some drivers for illegal logging include socio-economic factors, high demand for firewood, and property rights cases. The harsh financial climate in Serbia encourages citizens to engage in illegal logging, which is a quick and easy way to make money because there are large areas of forest and lack of regulation. Lenient fines and lack of cooperation from the government make it easier for illegal loggers to slip past punishment and become repeat offenders.

The financial damage from illegal logging is immense. The total cost of the trees that were cut down is about 4.6 billion RSD or around 43 million USD. In addition, illegal loggers do not practice restraint. Legal loggers cut down bent, sick, marked, and crooked trees, but illegal loggers are known to indiscriminately cut down large patches of forest that amount to 117,088 m^{3} of trees between 2021 to 2025. As a comparison, the entire country of Serbia cut down 41,349 m³ in state forests and 115,929 m³ in private forests in sanctioned operations during the same period.

Illegal logging in Serbia has environmental impacts aside from the financial consequences. For one, logging large areas of trees eliminates the benefits of a forest, including air purification, carbon sequestration, and biodiversity proliferation. Additionally, Serbia now faces soil erosion. Aerial imagery from different times show the degradation of forests into pastures due to illegal logging operations near the Kosovo-Serbia Border where illegal logging operations are most rampant. Because there are no longer trees to hold down the loose soil, floods have become more dangerous as they bring more debris with them. A case study showed that in an area where illegal logging occurred, the maximum sediment yield increased from 0.02 Mg/ha to 15.72 Mg/ha from 1999 to 2021, representing increased debris like soil, mud, rocks, and branches entering the flood flow.

Serbia had a 2018 Forest Landscape Integrity Index mean score of 5.29/10, ranking it 105th globally out of 172 countries.

== Biodiversity ==
Biodiversity in Serbia is in danger as urbanism and unchecked activities degrade Serbia’s natural spaces. Biodiversity in Serbia is rich in terms of the amount of species, but lacks physical outreach. Estimates place up to 60,000 different species within the territory, though only 45,000 taxa have been recorded. These species enjoy a rich ecosystem diversity as well, ranging from many types of forests, grasslands, pastures, and wetlands.

Despite the rich biodiversity and ecosystem diversity within Serbia, these ecological factors are under threat of diminishment. 270 animal species and 600 plant species in Serbia are considered to be under threat. The drainage of swamps and marshes for purposes of agricultural expansion have caused a loss of natural habitat, resulting in a decline in biodiversity. According to The Red Data Book of Flora of Serbia and The Red Data Book of Serbian Butterflies, there are 171 species of plants and 57 species of butterflies, listed as endangered. Out of the 171 plant species listed, 121 are listed as critically endangered. For vertebrates, the Preliminary list of Species of Serbian Vertebrae Red Book includes 353 species of mammals, fish, amphibians, and many other vertebrate species.

In addition to the decrease in biodiversity, the ecosystems where plants and animals live are in danger. Since the beginning of the 19th century, the percentage of forests that covered Serbia has decreased from 75-80% to 30.6% of coverage, according to a report made in 2006. This decrease is inversely related to the rise of agriculture, which occupies about 63.7% of Serbia’s land as of 2014. The loss of biodiversity and natural spaces are in relation to the problem of deforestation. Year after year, Serbia logs millions of cubic meters of forest which leads to the “destruction, degradation, and fragmentation of natural ecosystems.”

Other factors that threaten the population of wildlife in Serbia include industrial work like mining, tourism, and civil construction. Urban sprawl and water resources management go hand in hand as infrastructure that protects people from floods and other natural disasters. However, this harms wildlife especially as the residential population grows and occupies areas closer to natural habitats. Hunting and fishing are also contributing to the decrease in biodiversity; in 2010, the big game population decreased from 72,000 to 63,000 and about 5,000 tons of freshwater fish were caught.

Wetlands are crucial to harboring biodiversity and act as important natural resources to battle climate change. They act as carbon sinks, trapping carbon from the atmosphere into peat, like a sponge. However, because of agriculture, urbanization and inclement weather due to climate change, wetlands are being destroyed and are releasing their stored carbon. This creates a dangerous feedback loop where climate change induces inclement weather, and inclement weather leads to climate change because of carbon release.

== Climate change ==
In recent years, Serbia experienced more extreme and frequent weather events such as heat waves, floods, and drought. Between 2020 to 2024, the material cost from extreme environmental issues equals €10.45 billion. Aside from the economic cost, Serbia also suffers from severe water scarcity related to droughts. The Danube River Basin has seen a recent rise in the frequency and intensity of droughts since 2020. Periods of water scarcity resulting from these droughts affect Serbia the most.

Serbia also shows a higher than global average trend in the global warming process. The benchmark of global temperature is 1.1 °C compared to Serbia’s average temperature increase of 0.7 °C. This increase is higher during the summer, with average temperatures exceeding the benchmark by 1.5 °C.

=== Floods ===
Floods have become the dominant natural disaster in Serbia and it is projected that the number of floods will grow. In the past ten years, the most affected areas were western and central Serbia.

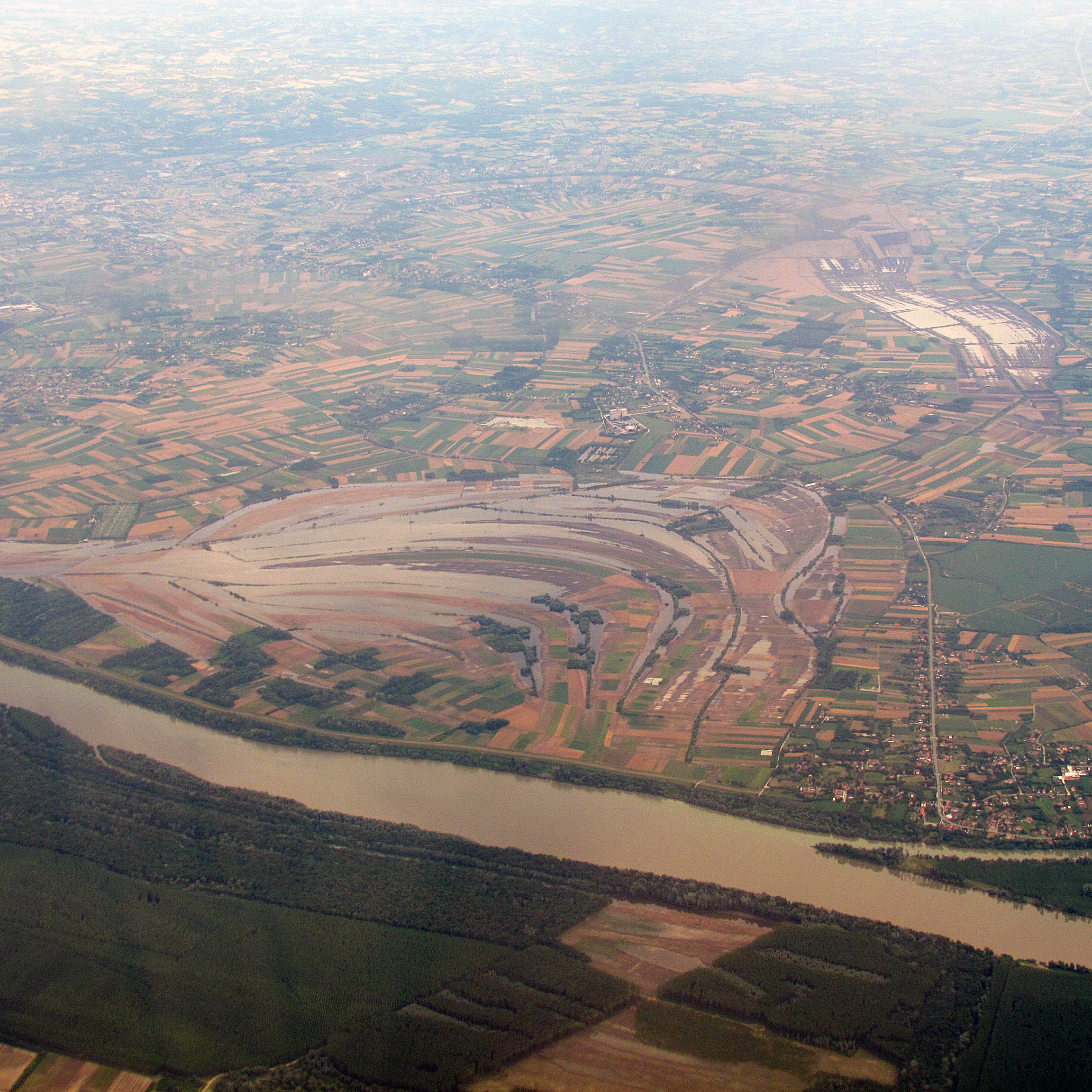
Flood in Obrenovac, 2014.

=== Drought ===
Droughts, which are already frequent in Serbia, are also expected to become more common. They have significantly impacted agriculture, fruit farming and the wine industry.

=== High temperatures ===
Between the beginning of January and the end of September 2020 there were four heat waves in Serbia. The frequency of heat waves has become a major threat to fruit farming.

=== Impact ===
Many families have lost their homes, fields and lives due to climate change in Serbia. According to Goran Trivan, the Minister of Environmental Protection, in the period from 2000 to 2015, the financial damage caused by climate change is estimated to be over five billion euros.

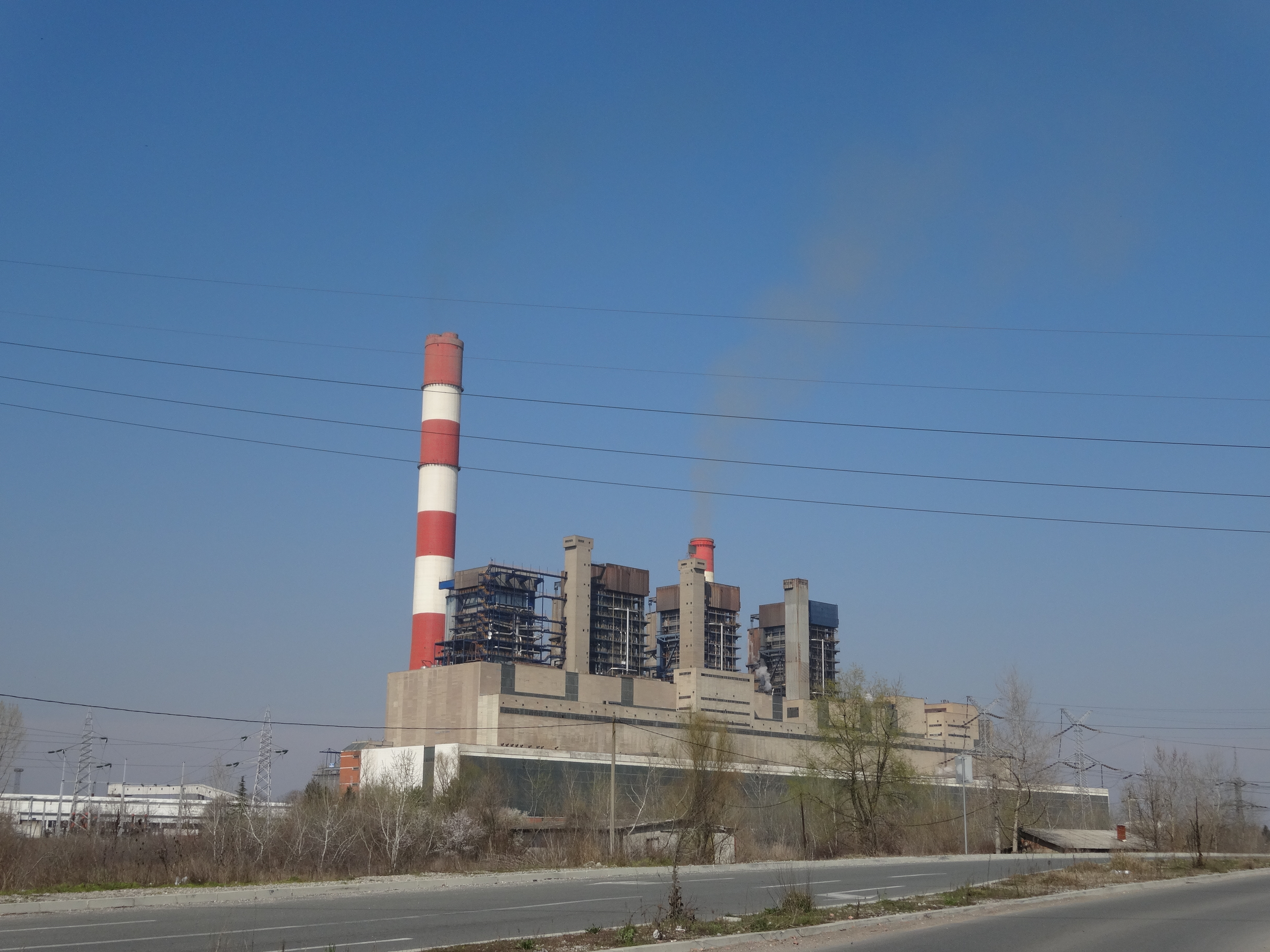
TPP Nikola Tesla in Obrenovac

== 1999 NATO bombing of Yugoslavia ==
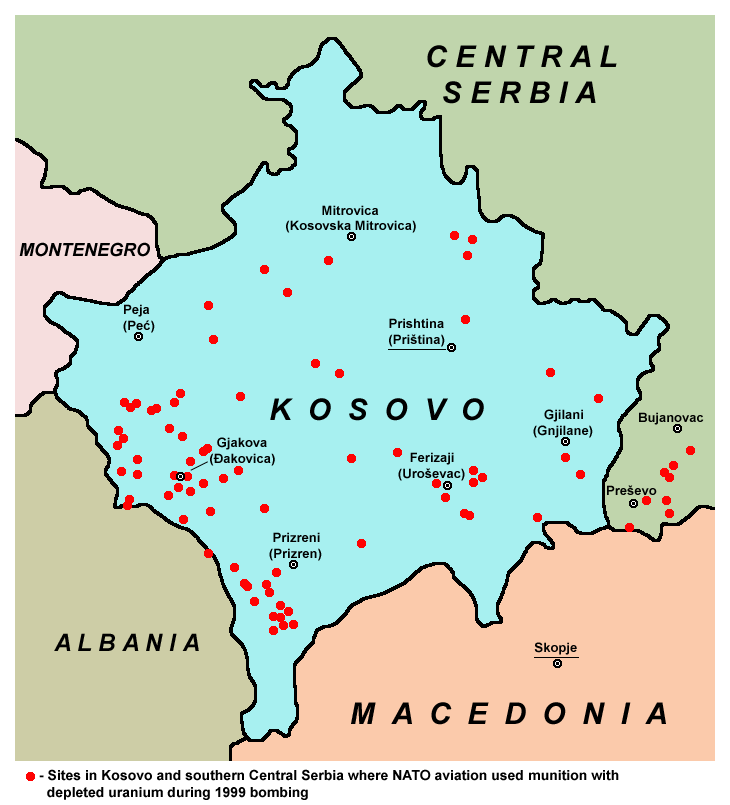
Sites in Kosovo and southern Central Serbia where NATO aviation used depleted uranium during the 1999 Kosovo War.

In 1999, during the Kosovo war, the North Atlantic Treaty Organization (NATO) organized an “Operation Allied Force” against Serbia leading to a severe and irreversible environmental impact in the country. The attack was launched towards public water and waste facilities, as well as industrial facilities such as factories, oil refineries, and fuel storage facilities, resulting in over 100,000 tons of carcinogens being released into the environment and killing about 1,000 members within the Serbian military force plus roughly 489 to 528 civilians. The amount of harmful chemicals being released into Serbia within a single day during the bombing includes 15,000 tons of NH_{3} , 1,800 tons of C_{2}H_{4}Cl_{2}, 1,500 tons of C_{2}H_{3}Cl, and 250 tons of Cl. The amount of chemicals being released exceeds even the most severe European incident, the Sandoz chemical spill in 1986, which created a long-lasting environmental impact.

The NATO bombings of 1999 caused lasting damage to the environment of Serbia, with several thousand tons of toxic chemicals stored in targeted factories being released into the soil, atmosphere and water basins affecting humans and the local wildlife.

After the bombing, the ground water was polluted with mercury and polychlorine biphenyl which is hazardous to human beings. 100 workers were afflicted with lung damage and reports indicate several laborers working to cease the chemical leak experienced unexplained heart issues. Even after two years of the bombing, only certain algaes exist within the contaminated sites and no other life could prosper.

In 2001, doctors at the Serb-run hospital in Kosovska Mitrovica say the number of patients with malignant diseases has increased by 200% since 1998. In the same year, the World Health Organization reported that data from Kosovo was inconclusive and called for further studies.

A 2003 study by the United Nations Environment Programme (UNEP) in Bosnia and Herzegovina stated that low levels of contaminate were found in drinking water and air particulate at DU penetrator impact points. The levels were stated as not a cause for alarm. Yet, Pekka Haavisto, chairman of the UNEP DU projects stated, "The findings of this study stress again the importance of appropriate clean-up and civil protection measures in a post-conflict situation."

== Government response ==
Though it is part of the Paris Agreement, Serbia still invests in coal-fired power stations and it has still not passed an environmental law and strategy in accordance with EU's climate change policy. There is also a lack of documentation and understanding of climate change in Serbia and its potential impacts on biodiversity.

=== Air ===
The government response to air pollution in Serbia often take the form of legislation that supports a transition to cleaner energy within various sectors. For example, in December 2020, authorities in the city of Kragujevac announced plans for 2021 to convert district boilers from burning coal to gas. These plans also included provisions to subsidize the replacement of solid fuel broilers within households, schools, and clinics. Authorities also outlined plans to subsidize a switch to cleaner electricity sources like solar panels within residential districts to supplement the subsidies targeting heating systems.

During 2009, Serbia adopted the Law on Air Protection to align with EU regulations. Under this law, a first draft of the Programme of Air Protection of the Republic of Serbia was completed. The Programme of Air Protection was a plan spanning the years 2022 to 2030 founded on three pillars: reduce air pollution emissions, improve air quality, and reduce the impact of air pollution on citizens’ health. Despite an early first draft, this plan was not finalized and adopted until December 2022, with estimated costs amounting to €2.6 billion. The final plan includes initiatives to replace household heating sources and older public transportation vehicles to cleaner alternatives along with assistance for various institutions in ideating projects that tackle the issue of air pollution. Although multiple plans to combat air pollution have been outlined and announced, reports dating up to 2025 indicate that the government struggles to implement and enforce these plans due to local communities’ lack of capacity to execute action items.

=== Water ===
Water protection in Serbia is regulated mainly by the Law on Waters supplemented by the law on Environmental Protection and the Law on Water Regime. The government adopted a Water management Strategy from 2016 to 2034. A 2015 review found that transposition for EU water directives was limited but in progress. The best results came from the Water Framework Directive and the Drinking Water Directive, while Serbia was not meeting the main pollution control requirements of the Urban Waste Water Treatment Directive and Nitrates Directive. Openings for Serbia to align with EU water legislation were opened in December 2021. In a 2025 report, the European Commission assessed Serbia as improving, and held Serbia accountable in ensuring that the infrastructure investments met EU environmental obligations along with national and international water obligations.

During the year of 2020, the Ministry of Construction, Transportation Infrastructure made contractual agreements with China Machinery Engineering Corporation, and the public utility Belgrade Waterworks and Sewerage for the collection and treatment of wastewater for the city's central sewer system. Located in Veliko Selo, the largest plant available in Belgrade would sit on the Danube River downstream to the most central parts of the city, which would collect sewage from the city and treat it before reaching into the lower Danube. In June 2024, the government signed a memorandum of understanding with the French company Suez and Vinci Construction Grands Projects to build and operate the plant itself. According to Suez, the plant is designed to treat 423,0000 cubic meters of wastewater per day, serving about 1.5 million inhabitants.

=== Deforestation ===
The government response to deforestation has been negligent. The negligence could be rooted in a systemic issue from higher positions in government. Reports state that no representative from Serbia's Ministry of Internal Affairs, Ministry of Agriculture, Forestry, and Water Management spoke on the issue when prompted for comments regarding deforestation.

Although a Kosovo Forest Agency was assembled to supervise the transport of illegally-obtained timber, little has been achieved because the agency lacks support from local police agencies, customs, and judicial branches. In all of 2025, the police only recorded 15 cases of “forest thefts.”

According to the United Nations Development Programme Serbia, Serbia adopted an environmental protection strategy in July 2026 called the Environmental Protection Strategy - Green Agenda for the period spanning 2025 to 2033, as well as an Action Plan for a period spanning 2025 to 2027. These two initiatives are Serbia’s implementation of the Green Agenda for the Western Balkans and serves as a guide for 5 key pillars which include “decarbonization and climate action, the circular economy, pollution reduction, sustainable agriculture and biodiversity conservation, as well as improved governance in the environmental sector.” Despite the Serbian government taking steps toward environmental protection, it is unclear whether curbing deforestation and illegal logging is part of the scope of action.

=== Biodiversity loss ===
Serbia has many laws to protect biodiversity including the Law on Environmental Protection from 2004, the Law on Nature Protection from 2009 to 2010, and the Law on Forests from 2010. The laws are being put into practice as “5 national parks, 16 nature parks, 58 landscapes of extraordinary characteristics with specific natural and cultural-historical values, 71 strict and special nature reserves, and 313 monuments of nature” are under protection.

In July, 2026, the Republic of Serbia adopted the Environmental Protection Strategy - Green Agenda for the period 2025-2033 in order specifically for “biodiversity conservation, as well as improved governance in the environmental sector.” Realization of its goals have been estimated cost about EUR 27 billion. As a part of these efforts Sweden provided funds for the “It’s not just a pond” movement, which seeks to bring more public awareness to the importance of wetlands and their conservation. Included in this plan is an initiative to utilize water buffaloes to help clear invasive plant species and increase water surface area in order to bring back native birds.

=== Climate change ===
Because Serbia is a candidate country for membership to the European Union (EU), they are responsible for meeting EU environmental and climate restrictions. The country already shows a positive improvement in reducing greenhouse gas emissions through the switch to renewable energy and the adoption of more green farming. However, areas like waste management and air quality monitoring still need improvement. The World Bank Group suggests more private sector investment in climate related issues in Serbia within the next 25 years as a potential solution to both environmental related issues and the reformation of the country’s financial market. The United Nations Development Programme (UNDP)’s climate promise would.

=== Environmental impacts of the 1999 NATO bombings ===
After the bombing, the United Nations Environmental Programme (UNEP) cooperated with UNCHS to form the Balkans Task Force (BTF) with the goal of addressing the massive pollution of air, land, and water. The damage of water resources in Serbia was already made and the damage would persist for at least the next few years. Due to the persistence of regional conflict, the U.S. president Bill Clinton stated that not a dime of reconstruction fee would be given to Belgrade, the capital and largest city of Serbia, unless the Yugoslavian president Slobodan Milošević is out of office. In response, the head of the BTF, Pekka Haavisto, insisted that no further damage to humans and the environment should occur after the bombing.

== See also ==
- Climate of Serbia
- Geography of Serbia
- NATO bombing of Yugoslavia
