= List of schools in Bulgaria =

This is a list of schools in Bulgaria.

- Galabov-Gymnasium Sofia
- 164 GPIE "Miguel de Cervantes"
- American College of Sofia
- American University in Bulgaria Blagoevgrad
- Anglo-American School of Sofia
- A.S. Popov School of Electronics
- Aprilov National High School
- English Language School "Geo Milev" (Ruse)
- Bacho Kiro High School
- First English Language School
- Filip Kutev's National School for Folk Arts Kotel
- Hristo Botev Comprehensive School, Targovishte
- Language School "Dr. Petar Beron"
- Lycée Français de Sofia
- Lycée Français Victor Hugo (Bulgaria)
- M. V. Lomonosov School of Electrotechnics and Electronics
- National Gymnasium of Natural Sciences and Mathematics "Academician Lyubomir Chakalov"
- NGDEK
- Professor Marin Drinov Elementary School
- PMG "Ekzarh Antim I"
- Zlatarski International School
- 19 High School "Elin Pelin"
- 22 High School "G. S. Rakovski"
- 30 High School "Bratya Miladinovi"
- 119 High School " Akad. Mihail Arnaudov"
- Darbi College
- Foreign Language High School "Hristo Botev", Kardzhali
- National High School for Folk Arts, Shiroka Laka
- National Music School Lyubomir Pipkov
- National School Of Arts "Dobri Hristov"
- National Learning Complex of Culture
- Sofia University "St. Kliment of Ochrid"
- 134 Middle School "Dimcho Debelyanov"
- National School for Music and Performing Arts, "Prof. Pancho Vladigerov" Burgas
- St. George International School & Preschool

== See also ==
- Education in Bulgaria
- List of universities in Bulgaria
- Schools and kindergartens in Bulgaria
