= 164 GPIE "Miguel de Cervantes" =

- 164 ГПИЕ „Мигел де Сервантес“

Location
- Sofia; Bulgaria; 42.6933°N 23.3473°E

Information
- Type: Language school Secondary Public School
- Established: 1991
- Director: Zornitsa Yoncheva
- Newspaper: "La Voz Cervantes”
- Website: www.ibbcervantes-bg.com

164 GPIE "Miguel de Cervantes" (Bulgarian: 164 ГПИЕ "Мигел де Сервантес, 164th High School with Advanced Studies in Spanish Language "Miguel de Cervantes) is among the top and most prestigious secondary schools in Bulgaria and the Balkans, based in the capital city of Sofia.

The school, founded in 1991, is the first public school in Bulgaria to teach Spanish as a first language and one of three now.

164 GPIE "Miguel de Cervantes" and the American College of Sofia are considered to be the best high schools in Bulgaria. The students of the two schools almost always take the first two places, with very small differences, in the Bulgarian matriculations. 164 GPIE "Miguel de Cervantes" is consistently ranked among the top-performing high schools in Bulgaria based on the annual national matriculation exams (DZI), with students regularly achieving average scores above 5.50 (Excellent).

== Name ==
The school's name comes from the famous Miguel de Cervantes, a Spanish novelist, poet, and playwright, also the author of Don Quixote, born on 9 October 1547, in Alcalá de Henares.

== Cultural activities ==
The school has an active tradition of student theatre productions. In 1994, students staged ''La guarda cuidadosa'' and ''El viejo celoso'' by Miguel de Cervantes and "El testamento del tio Nacho" by Francesc Eiximenis and Angels Garriga. This was made possible with help from the Spanish Embassy, Theater 199, and the Spanish Section of the Capital City Library. Direction by Haydee Gloria Reynoso Gonzalez Boneva & Julia Dimitrova.
