= International rankings of Bulgaria =

These are the international rankings of Bulgaria

== Geographic rankings ==
14th largest country in Europe

== Demographic rankings ==
Organization	Survey	Ranking
United Nations Development Programme	Human Development Index	70 out of 187
University of Leicester	Satisfaction with Life Index	164 out of 178
Economist Intelligence Unit	Quality-of-life Index	57 out of 111
none	Home ownership rate	18th
New Economics Foundation	Happy Planet Index	82 out of 143
Global Footprint Network	Ecological footprint	73rd
World Health Organization	Alcohol consumption per capita	26th
World Health Organization	Cigarette consumption per capita	32 out of 121
World Health Organization	Suicide rate	123 out of 183
World Resources Institute	Coffee consumption per capita	43 out of 143
World Bank	Vehicles per capita	61 out of 182

== Economic rankings ==
Organization	Survey	Ranking
Fraser Institute	Economic Freedom of the World	28 out of 30
Transparency International	Corruption Perceptions Index	73 out of 178
World Economic Forum	Global Competitiveness Report	62 out of 144
Foreign Policy	Globalization Index	32 out of 181

== Political rankings ==
Organization	Survey	Ranking
Economist Intelligence Unit	Democracy Index	51 out of 167
Reporters Without Borders	Press Freedom Index	87 out of 178
Fund for Peace	Failed States Index	130 out of 165^{1}
United Nations Public Administration Network	e-Government Readiness	44 out of 50

- ^{1}Note: lower ranking at the FSI means more sustainable, and higher means more unstable.

== Military rankings ==
Organization	Survey	Ranking
Institute for Economics and Peace	Global Peace Index	53 out of 153
none	List of countries by number of troops	72nd
SIPRI	World's largest arms exporters	14th

== Technological rankings ==
Organization	Survey	Ranking
World Intellectual Property Organization	Global Innovation Index, 2026	37 out of 139
