= Executive Agency Port Administration =

Bulgarian government corporation

The Executive Agency Port Administration is a corporate body of the Bulgarian Ministry of Transport. It consolidates regional divisions in Varna, Bourgas, Rousse, and Lom. Its legal authority covers all ports, excluding the navy ones.
