= Telecommunications in Bulgaria =

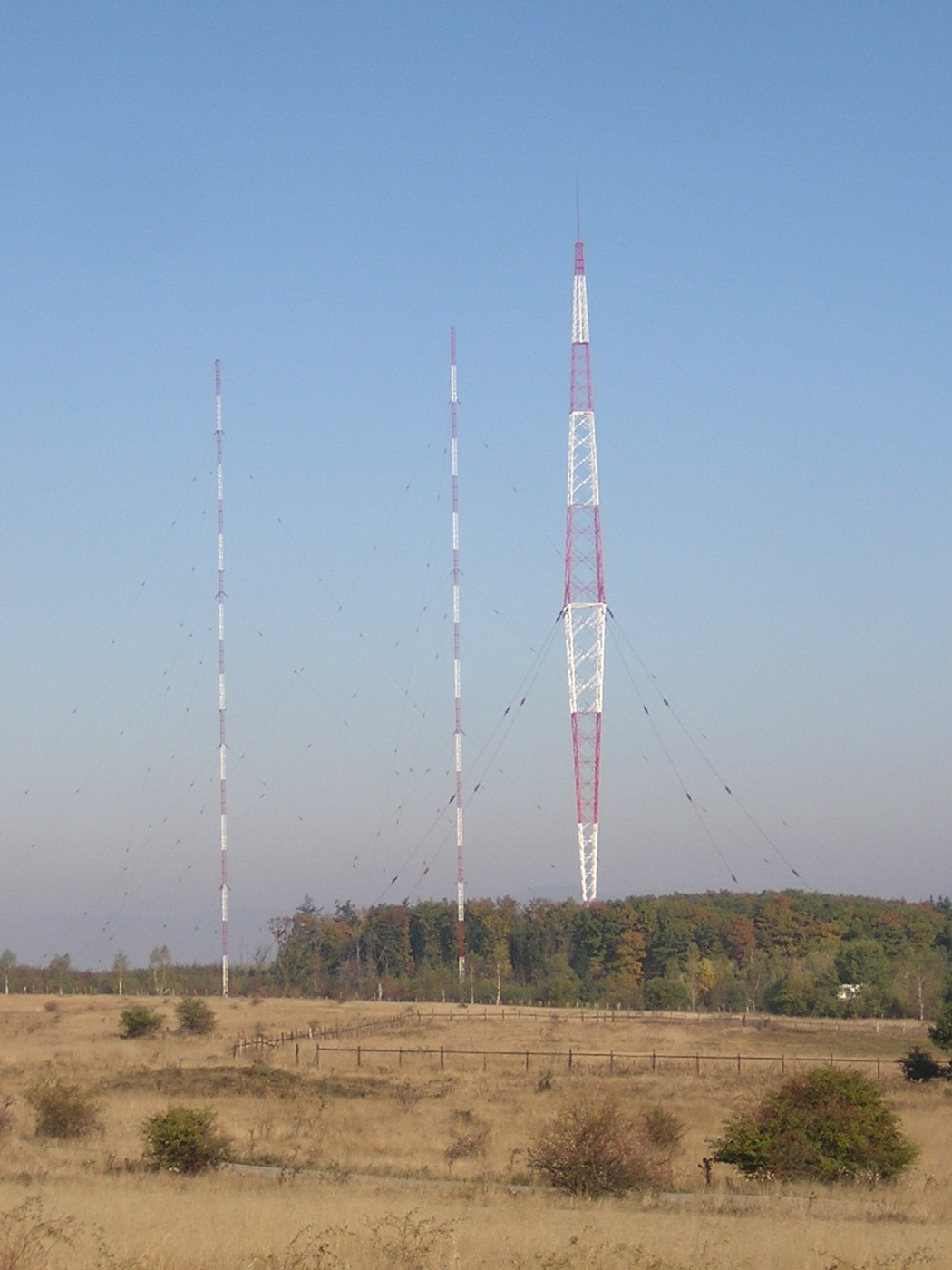
Blaw-Knox tower and two mast antennae, Vakarel radio transmitter

Telecommunications in Bulgaria include radio, television, fixed and mobile telephones, and the Internet.

== History ==
Until the mid-1930s, telephone exchanges were of the "numberer" type, i.e. manually operated by telephone operators. The introduction of the first automatic telephone exchanges (ATC) in Bulgaria began with the installation of ATCs by the Siemens-Halske company, first in Stara Zagora (1935 - 600 numbers), then in Varna and Ruse (also 1935, 1000 numbers each). The first ATC in Sofia ("Levov Most" - 2000 numbers) was put into operation on June 14, 1936, followed by Gabrovo, Burgas, Veliko Tarnovo. After 1938, Nikola Rashev was the leader on the Bulgarian side. In the years around 1940, there was already a significant number of well-trained personnel in the country and the new equipment was being successfully operated.

The telephone house in Sofia was built according to a design by Stancho Belkovski and Boris Yolov. Its construction began in 1938-1939 and was finally completed only in 1949. It housed the facilities of the Sofia ATC, as well as the relevant administrative premises. This was the first telephone hall building, but later such buildings housing local ATCs were built in other large cities of Bulgaria.

During the bombing of Sofia in 1943-44, telephone communications in the capital were severely affected. On 09.09.1944, the new government found in Sofia only one temporary city manual telephone exchange with about 180 posts and also a temporary intercity exchange for several lines to larger cities. The manual telephone exchange in the center with 8000 numbers, the long-distance and international exchange, the high-frequency systems, the automatic exchange "Levov Most" with 3000 numbers, "Red Cross" with 2500 numbers and the entire underground and above-ground cable and aerial network were severely damaged and put out of action. For a short time, along with the restoration of the telephone network, the long-distance telephone exchange, the manual telephone exchange, the half-destroyed ATC "Levov Most" came into operation. The new "Red Cross" exchange was installed, the installation of the "Lozenets" ATC and others were completed.

Following the end of World War II and the establishment of the People's Republic of Bulgaria the Ministry of Railways, Posts and Telegraphs of Bulgaria was dissolved and divided into two organizations: Ministry of Railways, Roads and Water Communications and Ministry of Posts, Telegraphs and Telephones which operated the postal system. From 1957 the Ministry of Post was merged back into the Ministry of Transport and Communications with postal administration and telecommunications administration operating under its jurisdiction. In 1981 the postal department and telecommunications department were united to form a state-owned company, the Bulgarian Post and Telecommunications (Bulgarian: Български пощи и далекосъобщения. In 1992 following the demise of the communist regime and the establishment of modern Bulgaria, the regulatory part was given to the newly created Committee for Post and Telecommunications, and the company itself split into two separate entities: the Bulgarian Posts took over postal activities with the telecommunication section being incorporated as a Bulgarian Telecommunications Company and was later privatized.

== Radio and television ==
- Radio broadcast stations: AM 31, FM 63, shortwave 2 (2001).
- Radio broadcast hours: 525,511 (2003).
- Television broadcast stations: 39 (2001).
- Television broadcast hours: 498,091 (2003).

== Telephony ==
- Main lines in use: 1.6 million (2015 est).
- Mobile cellular: 8.98 million lines (2016).
- Telephone system:
  - General assessment: an extensive but antiquated telecommunications network inherited from the Soviet era; quality has improved; the Bulgaria Telecommunications Company's fixed-line monopoly terminated in 2005 when alternative fixed-line operators were given access to its network; a drop in fixed-line connections in recent years has been more than offset by a sharp increase in mobile-cellular telephone use fostered by multiple service providers; the number of cellular telephone subscriptions now exceeds the population
  - Domestic: a fairly modern digital cable trunk line now connects switching centers in most of the regions; the others are connected by digital microwave radio relay
  - International: country code – 359; submarine cable provides connectivity to Ukraine and Russia; a combination submarine cable and land fiber-optic system provides connectivity to Italy, Albania, and North Macedonia; satellite earth stations – 3 (1 Intersputnik in the Atlantic Ocean region, 2 Intelsat in the Atlantic and Indian Ocean regions) (2007).

== Internet ==
- Top-level domains: .bg and .бг (proposed, Cyrillic).
- Internet users:
  - 4.1 million users (2016)
  - 3.9 million users, 72nd in the world; 55.1% of the population, 74th in the world (2012);
  - 3.4 million users, 63rd in the world (2009);
  - 1.9 million users (2007).
- Fixed broadband: 1.2 million subscriptions, 52nd in the world; 17.6% of population, 53rd in the world (2012).
- Wireless broadband: 2.8 million, 55th in the world; 40.3% of the population, 41st in the world (2012).
- Internet hosts:
  - 976,277 hosts, 47th in the world (2012);
  - 513,470 (2008).
- IPv4: 4.2 million addresses allocated, 0.1% of the world total, 589.7 addresses per 1000 people, 51st in the world (2012).

== See also ==
- Internet Society – Bulgaria
- List of internet service providers in Bulgaria
- Bulgaria
