= List of universities and colleges in Bulgaria =

This is a list of universities in Bulgaria. As of February 15, 2023, there are 52 accredited higher education institutions in the country - universities, academies, colleges, etc.

== Universities ==
- Academy of the Ministry of Interior - Sofia
- Agricultural University of Plovdiv
- American University in Bulgaria
- Bulgarian Virtual University
- Burgas Free University
- D. A. Tsenov Academy of Economics
- European Polytechnical University
- Georgi Rakovski Military Academy
- Higher School of Insurance and Finance
- National Academy for Theatre and Film Arts
- Lyuben Karavelov Civil Engineering University
- Medical University Pleven
- Medical University - Plovdiv
- Medical University of Varna
- National Academy of Art
- National Military University
- National Sports Academy
- New Bulgarian University
- "Nikola Vaptsarov" Naval Academy
- Pancho Vladigerov National Academy of Music
- Plovdiv University
- Ruse University
- Specialized Higher School of Librarian Knowledge and Information Technology - Sofia
- Sofia Medical University
- Sofia University
- South-West University "Neofit Rilski"
- Technical University of Gabrovo
- Technical University of Sofia
- Technical University of Sofia - Branch Plovdiv
- Technical University of Varna
- Todor Kableshkov Higher School of Transport
- Trakia University - Stara Zagora
- University of Architecture, Civil Engineering and Geodesy
- University of Chemical Technology and Metallurgy
- University of Economics Varna
- University of Food Technology
- University of Forestry
- University of Mining and Geology
- University of National and World Economy
- University of Shumen "Episkop Konstantin Preslavski"
- University "Prof. Asen Zlatarov" - Burgas
- Varna Free University
- Varna University of Management
- Vasil Levski National Military University
- Veliko Tarnovo University

== See also ==
- Education in Bulgaria
- List of schools in Bulgaria
