= Hinduism in Bulgaria =

Hinduism is a minority religion in Bulgaria. Its modern spread is largely attributed to ISKCON (International Society for Krishna Consciousness), which was registered as a religious denomination in Bulgaria on 27 November 1991, making it the first non-Abrahamic religion to be officially registered in the country. Prior to this, the registered religious denominations were Orthodox Christianity, the Armenian-Gregorian denomination, Islam, and Judaism. ISKCON began actively spreading Krishna Consciousness among Bulgarians from 1996.

== History ==
Interest in Indian spiritual culture and ancient traditions grew in Bulgaria during the national revival period. The most prominent scholar to engage with Indian culture was Georgi Stoykov Rakovski, who drew parallels between Hindu mythological figures such as the yakṣas and yakṣinīs and similar beings in Bulgarian folk tales, songs, and rituals.

In 1991, the first ISKCON missionaries arrived in Bulgaria from India and Italy. In 2007, the organisation sought to establish independent legal entities within Bulgaria. One of its central members, Asen Genov, attempted to register ISKCON as an entirely new religious organisation rather than as a branch of the international body. The City Court of Sofia rejected the application on the grounds that the proposed organisation too closely resembled the existing ISKCON branch. Following a series of appeals, Genov brought the case to the European Court of Human Rights, which ruled in his favour, finding that Bulgaria had violated his rights under Articles 9 and 11 of the ECHR. ISKCON was subsequently re-registered as a new denomination in 2017.

In 1997, the East-West Indological Foundation was established in Sofia to promote Indian culture, philosophy, and traditions across Bulgaria. The Foundation offers educational programmes focused on Indian culture, including Hindu beliefs and practices.

The Art of Living Foundation, founded by Sri Sri Ravi Shankar, has been active in Bulgaria since 2005. Over 20,000 people in Bulgaria have attended its workshops, which have included three humanitarian initiatives: Healthy and Happy Bulgaria, Childhood without Aggression, and Freedom in Prison. Sri Sri Ravi Shankar made his first visit to Bulgaria in 2009.

== ISKCON in Bulgaria ==
According to the Indian Embassy in Sofia, more than 500 Indian nationals live and work in Bulgaria. In the 2011 population census, approximately 500 Bulgarians identified their religious denomination as ISKCON, making it the largest Hindu organisation in Bulgaria, though official sources suggest the actual number of active members is closer to 150–200. Followers are concentrated primarily in the capital Sofia and in Plovdiv.

=== Organisational structure ===
ISKCON in Bulgaria is governed by a general assembly known as the Brahmana Council, headed by a president. Local branches are administered by local councils, each led by a temple president. Membership is open to anyone who has complied with the organisation's statutes and moral code for a minimum of one year.

=== Temples and places of worship ===
The main temple is located in the Malinova district in the southern part of Sofia. Daily worship is held at 08:00, including a Srimad Bhagavatam class. An additional ISKCON shrine is located in Aheloy.

== Rathayatra in Bulgaria ==
Rathayatra is a major Vaishnava festival celebrated annually by Krishna devotees. The first Rathayatra parade in Bulgaria was held in 1996, making it the first such festival in the Balkans. By March 2008, twelve Rathayatra festivals had been celebrated in the country. The event draws attendees from neighbouring countries, including North Macedonia and Serbia.

== Yoga in Bulgaria ==
Dr B.V. Reddy is credited with introducing yoga to Bulgaria. In 1989, a conference was held at the Black Sea city of Varna, organised for the Red Cross and attended by medical professionals and delegates from around the world. Dr Reddy presented yoga as a means of eliminating toxins from the body without pharmaceutical intervention. This is the earliest recorded instance of yoga being practised in Bulgaria.

The Indian Embassy in Sofia has organised an International Day of Yoga (IDY) event annually since 2015. The inaugural IDY Bulgaria was held on 21 June 2015 across nine Bulgarian cities. The event has since expanded and is now held in more than 40 cities and towns across the country. Admission is free and open to all.

== Criticism and opposition ==
In 1993, the original members of ISKCON attempted to establish a temple in the Philipovtsi area of Sofia. A campaign led by local residents and supported by the Mayor sought to prevent the construction. Opposition escalated into violence when members' homes were targeted and shots were fired at them. This period marked the beginning of sustained prejudice against the organisation, with members being characterised as drug addicts and as prone to suicide.

In 2015, during the Rathayatra festival in Burgas, participants were attacked by vandals who shouted "You are a sect! You must die!" One participant was injured and required hospital treatment.

In August 2025, the Holy Synod of the Bulgarian Orthodox Church released a statement condemning neo-Hindu movements in Bulgaria, accusing them of attempting to intertwine "pagan" beliefs with Christianity. The statement also condemned the portrayal of Jesus Christ as a spiritual leader equivalent to others. The Synod warned that such groups use community outreach activities — including educational programmes, peace projects, health courses, cultural seminars, sports clubs, and stress relief seminars — as a means of proselytising among Christians.
