= Rakita (Babušnica) =

Rakita Ракита
- Village
- Location within Serbia
- Coordinates: 42°54′31″N 22°33′19″E
- Country: Serbia
- Region: Southern and Eastern Serbia
- District: Pirot
- Municipality: Babušnica

Population (2002)
  - Total: 340
- Time zone: UTC+1 (CET)
  - Summer (DST): UTC+2 (CEST)

Rakita (Serbian Cyrillic: Ракита) is a village in the municipality of Babušnica, Serbia. According to the 2002 census, the village has a population of 340 people.
