= Education in Bulgaria =

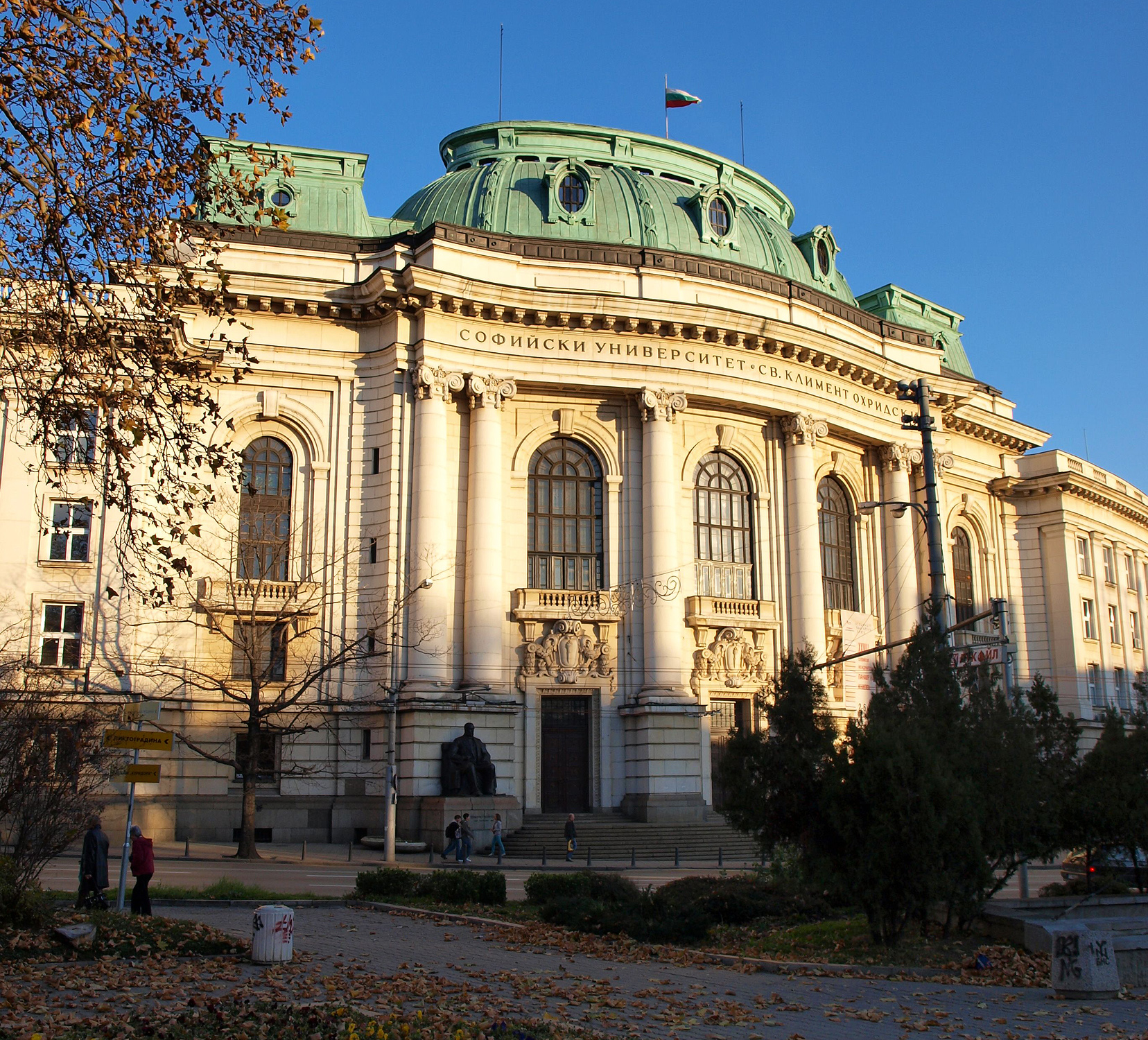
Sofia University Rectorate and main building

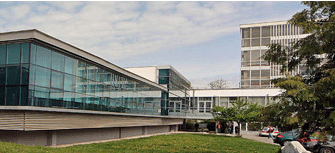
New Bulgarian University campus

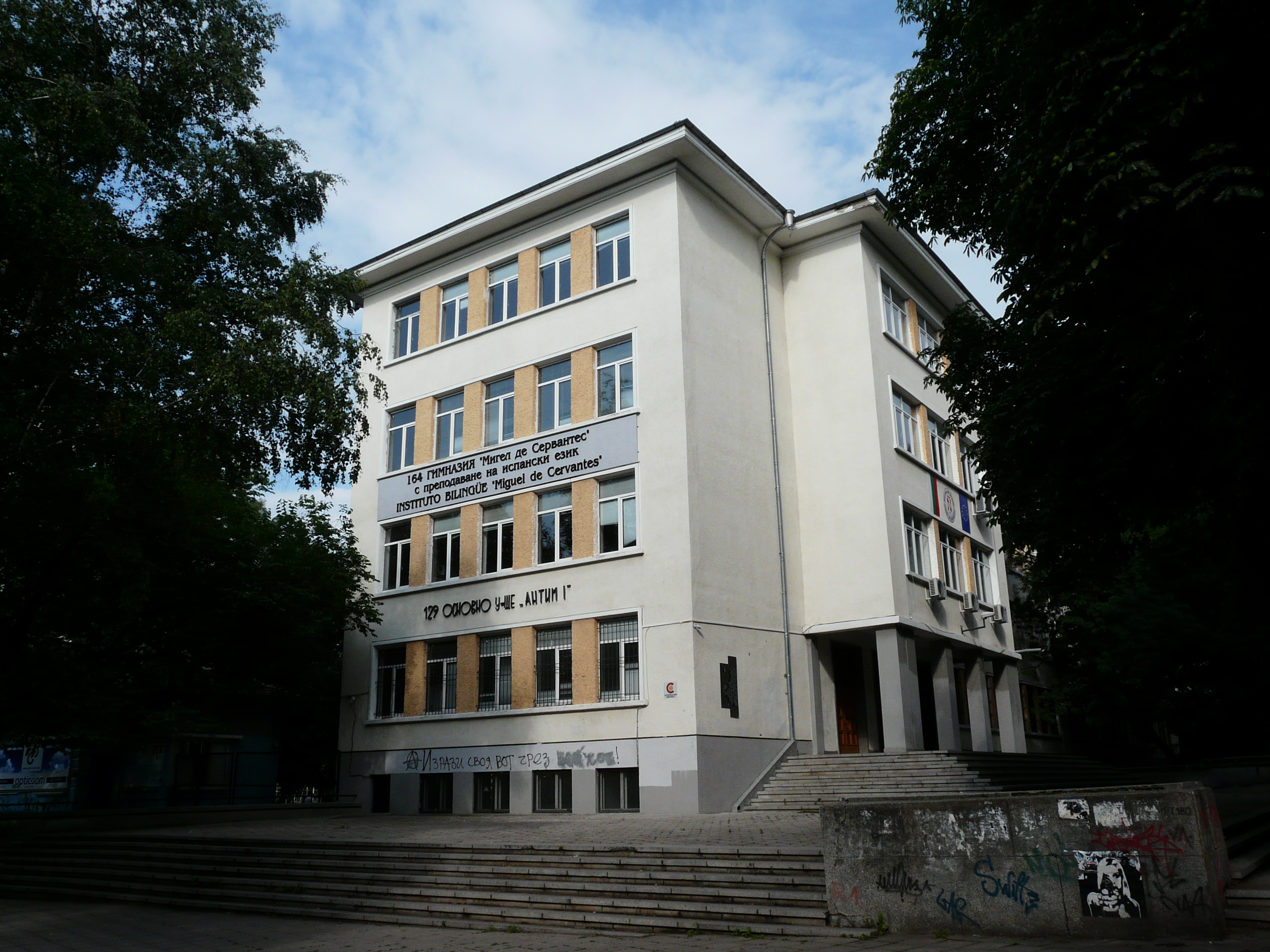
164 GPIE "Miguel de Cervantes", one of the most prestigious Bulgarian high schools

Education in Bulgaria is guided and overseen by Bulgarian Ministry of Education and Science. Compulsory education includes three years of pre-primary education, primary education, and secondary education. The schools start by age of seven and end the age of 18. Compulsory education at state schools is free of charge. The state and private higher education schools, colleges and universities charge fees, although they offer students scholarships.

In 1998 enrollment in the primary grades was 93 percent of eligible students, and enrollment in the secondary grades was 81 percent of eligible students. With the gender ratio of female to male students in primary schools was 0.97, and the ratio in secondary schools was 0.98. Because of the prior Bulgaria's low birthrate during the postcommunist period, total primary and secondary school enrollment was in a slightly decreased level in the beginning of the post-communist period, that was causing some reductions in teaching staff and facilities. But at the same time, private schools and colleges appeared and their number quickly increased by 10 times during the 1990s. Bulgaria's higher education system was reorganized in the mid-1990s. Between 1995 and 2002, the number of university graduates increased from 33,000 to 50,000. In 2002 in higher learning 42 universities and colleges were in operation, and 215,700 students were enrolled. In 2003 some 4.9 percent of Bulgaria's national budget was devoted to education.

The Human Rights Measurement Initiative (HRMI) finds that Bulgaria is fulfilling only 75.7% of what it should be fulfilling for the right to education based on the country's level of income. HRMI breaks down the right to education by looking at the rights to both primary education and secondary education. While taking into consideration Bulgaria's income level, the nation is achieving 62.1% of what should be possible based on its resources (income) for primary education and 89.3% for secondary education.

== History of Bulgarian education ==
The first schools in Bulgaria were opened in the 9th century by the Tsar Simeon The Great. Two notable linguistic literary church schools that taught the Glagolitic and Cyrillic alphabets to the Christianized Bulgarian slavs were also established in that period at Ohrid and Preslav, with the one in Ohrid having more than 3000 students at one point.

Modern schools began opening in the early 19th century (during the National Revival) first for boys and then for girls. Those schools provided only basic education, such as reading, writing, and basic arithmetic. Students who wished to continue their education had to go study abroad. After Bulgaria overturned the Ottoman rule in 1878, it started laying the foundations of its educational system. In 1878 the government passed the Temporary Law on National Schools. This law stimulated the establishment of schools in villages. However, many peasants did not let their children attend school because they thought education was not relevant to peasant life. Furthermore, several universities were established in the period 1878 - 1918. Educational process in Bulgaria was disrupted during the Balkan Wars (1912 - 1913) and World War I. By the mid-1920s normal function of schools had been restored.

During the communist era, the Soviet Union had a great impact on Bulgarian educational system. A new form of education was brought in. Emphasis on liberal arts was replaced by increased technical training. In 1979 Zhivkov created the Unified Secondary Polytechnical School, which was a twelve-grade program focusing mainly on technical subjects. After the end of the Zhivkov Era, the Bulgarian educational system was completely reconstructed. The government sought to depoliticize the system and take the opinions of others into consideration. The influence of Soviet Russia through educational propaganda within Bulgaria's former education system is covered in 'Soviet Propaganda & The Classroom' by the British-Bulgarian writer, Jonathan R. P. Taylor.

== Structure of the educational system ==
The system consists of four levels:

=== Preschool education ===
Pre-primary education (preschool education) accepts children between 3 and 6/7 years old, who attend kindergarten optionally, with the requirement that prior to starting school, children must attend three years of pre-school education.

During the school year 2007/2008, 74.8% of children aged 3–6 years were enrolled in kindergartens.

=== Primary education ===
Elementary education (grades 1–7) includes primary school (grades 1–4) and junior high school/middle school (grades 5–7). Children usually start primary education at age 7, but may be start from age 6 upon their parents' request. Certificate for Primary Education and Certificate for Elementary Education are obtained upon successful completion of grade 4 and 7 respectively. High schools use grades from the Certificate for Elementary Education as a major admissions criterion.

=== Secondary education ===
Secondary education comprises selective/comprehensive high schools and vocational school. The admission to comprehensive schools is based upon grades from entry exams, usually in literature and/or mathematics as well as grades in junior high school. Students can enroll in high school after the successful completion of grades 7 or 8 (for students who finished school before 2017). Usually, those who want to study languages, mathematics, or informatics in-depth apply to high school after 7th grade. Students graduating from high-school must successfully complete 12th Grade and sit for matriculation exams in Bulgarian language and Literature, as well as one (or two) subject(s) of choice. They obtain a Диплома за средно образование / Diploma za sredno obrazovanie (Diploma of Secondary Education) with GPA composed of their grades from mandatory and specialist modules in 11th and 12th Grade and the grades from the matriculation exams.

=== Higher education ===
The types of higher education institutions are Universities, Colleges and Specialized Higher Schools. Universities, as in most countries worldwide, have three stages: Bachelor's (undergraduate), Master's (graduate), and Doctoral degrees. Undergraduate stage lasts for at least four years and graduate stage lasts for five years after completion of secondary education or one year after obtaining a bachelor's degree. The third stage of higher education results in obtaining a Ph.D. Degree. Specialized higher schools offer degrees in one or more areas of science, arts, sports, and defense. Usually, the names of these institutions indicate the area of specialization. Colleges are former semi-higher institutes. Some of them are part of universities and use their equipment and facilities.

== Structure and curricula of the school year ==
The curriculum of Bulgarian Educational system focuses on eight main subjects: Bulgarian language and literature, foreign languages, mathematics, information technologies, social sciences and civics, natural sciences and ecology, music and art, physical education and sports. The school year starts on September 15 and ends in May or June, depending on the grade level of the students. The school year is divided into two terms with Christmas, Easter and Summer holidays. Students usually spend half a day in school; with many schools operating in "shifts": either in the morning or in the afternoon, although younger students usually study in the morning. In some elementary schools there is the option of extended care, where students spend the other half of the day in school preparing their homework under the supervision of a teacher, upon the request of parents.

== Grading ==
The grading system is based on numerals, where 6 is the highest and 2 is the lowest grade a student can obtain, where 6 is excellent, 5 is very good, 4 is good, 3 is sufficient, and 2 is poor. The grades are divided into 100 points and any mark over .50 is considered part of the upper bracket. For example, 5.50 is excellent, 5.75 is also excellent but 5.25 is very good. 6.00 is the highest possible mark. Generally, anything under 3.00 is considered a fail. These points are mainly used when grading tests which give specific points per correct answer.

== Educational behaviour ==
Following "numerous reports over the past decade about school violence", the Education Minister in 2009 introduced stricter regulations about student behaviour, including inappropriate dress, being drunk, and carrying mobile phones. Teachers were to be given new powers to punish disruptive students.

== Literacy ==
Traditionally, Bulgaria has had a very high knowledge and literacy rate, while usually trying to follow the best study destination countries, schools and universities.

In 2003 Bulgaria’s literacy rate was estimated at 98.6 percent, with approximately the same rate for both sexes. Bulgaria traditionally has had high educational standards. In the post-communist era, low funding and low teacher morale have damaged the system to some extent, particularly in vocational training. Adherence to classical teaching methods has handicapped development in some technical fields. The current system of education, introduced in 1998, has 12 school grades. In 2003, one year of preschool education was made mandatory, and in 2012 this was extended to two mandatory years of preschool education.

== See also ==
- List of schools in Bulgaria
- List of universities in Bulgaria
- Education in Europe
