= Environmental issues in Bulgaria =

Like other countries in the Soviet sphere of influence, Bulgaria strongly emphasized heavy industry and intensive agriculture but did not mitigate the environmental consequences of such a policy. As a result, in the early 1990s an estimated 60 percent of agricultural land was polluted by fertilizers and pesticides, two-thirds of rivers were polluted, and two-thirds of primary forests had been leveled.

== History ==
Although environmental awareness improved in the post-communist era, the state’s lack of administrative strength and fears of unemployment prevented the curtailment of many dangerous practices. For example, the four reactors of Bulgaria’s only nuclear power plant, the Kozloduy Nuclear Power Plant, were declared unsafe in the early 1990s, but the first reactor closure occurred only in 2003. All four of the original VVER-440/230 reactors have since been shut down, with only the two newer VVER-1000 units still in operation.

Because cleanup has been economically problematic in the post-communist era, in the mid-2000s Bulgaria still had grave environmental crises. Among them were air pollution from industrial emissions; the inability to filter effluents into rivers, leading to concentrations of untreated sewage, heavy metals, and detergents; severely depleted natural forest cover; forest damage from air pollution and resulting acid rain; and soil contamination by heavy metals resulting from improper industrial waste disposal.

In the 1990s and early 2000s, a rapid increase in motor vehicles using leaded fuel exacerbated urban air pollution. The agency responsible for protection against all forms of environmental pollution is the Ministry of Environment and Water. The prospect of membership in the European Union (EU) is expected to raise Bulgaria’s environmental standards.

Bulgaria had a 2018 Forest Landscape Integrity Index mean score of 6.09/10, ranking it 86th globally out of 172 countries.
