= 5th-century Roman domes =

In the city of Rome, at least 58 domes in 44 buildings are known to have been built before domed construction ended in the middle of the 5th century. Although they continued to be built elsewhere in Italy, domes would not be built again within Rome until 1453. The last domed church in the city of Rome for centuries was Santo Stefano al Monte Celio around 460. It had an unusual centralized plan and a 22 meter wide dome made with vaulting tubes, a technique that may have been imported from the new western capital of Ravenna. Other 5th century Italian domes may include a church at Casaranello (first half of the 5th century), the chapel of San Vittore in Milan at the Basilica of Sant'Ambrogio, the chapel of St. Maria Mater Domini in the church of San Felice and Fortunato in Vicenza, and Sicily's Cuba of Malvagna (5th or 6th century) and San Pietro ad Baias (5th or 6th century).

With the end of the Western Roman Empire, domes became a signature feature of the church architecture of the surviving Eastern Roman Empire. A transition from timber-roofed basilicas to vaulted churches seems to have occurred there between the late 5th century and the 7th century, with early examples in Constantinople, Asia Minor, and Cilicia. The first known domed basilica may have been a church at Meriamlik in southern Turkey, dated to between 471 and 494, although the ruins do not provide a definitive answer. It is possible earlier examples existed in Constantinople, where it has been suggested that the plan for the Meriamlik church itself was designed, but no domed basilica has been found there before the 6th century.

There were a half dozen tetraconch-plan buildings built in important cities from Syria to northern Mesopotamia in a 75-year period beginning around 460, with their 10-13 meter central space covered either by a pyramidal roof or a dome made of timber or another light material. Examples were found at Seleucia Pieria (the so-called "martyrion"), Rusafah, Apamea, possibly incorporated into the Al-Halawiyah Madrasa at Aleppo, at the site of St. Mary Church in Diyarbakır, and the cathedral at Bosra. Four aisled tetraconchs from the late 5th or the 6th century were built in the upper Balkan peninsula: the Hagia Sophia in Edirne, the Red Church in Perushtitsa, and two buildings near Lake Ohrid.

== Honorius ==
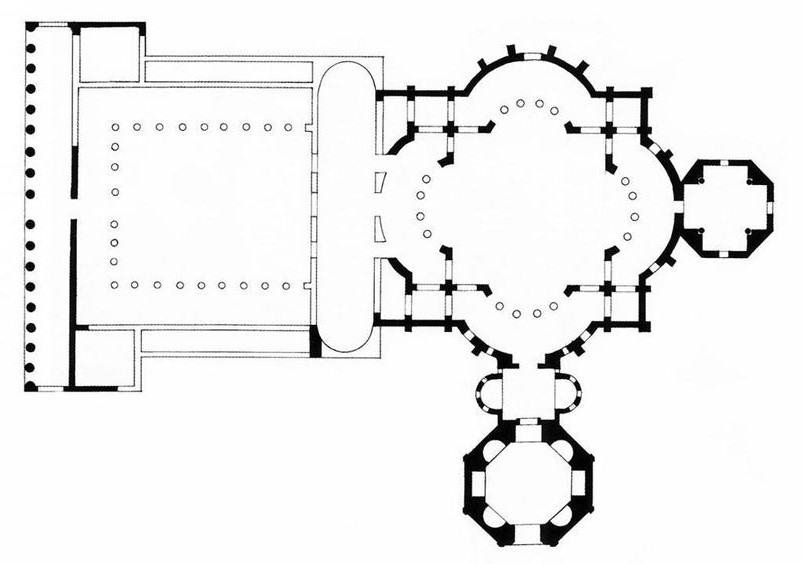
Plan of San Lorenzo Maggiore in Milan, with the attached chapels of Sant'Ippolito (at right) and Saint Aquiline (at bottom)

The largest centrally planned Early Christian church, the Basilica of San Lorenzo Maggiore, was built in Milan while that city served as the capital of the Western Empire and may have been domed with a light material, such as timber or cane. There are two theories about the shape of this dome: a Byzantine-style dome on spherical pendentives with a ring of windows similar to domes of the later Justinian era, or an octagonal cloister vault following Roman trends and like the vaulting over the site's contemporary chapel of Saint Aquiline, possibly built with vaulting tubes. Although the pieces of vaulting tubes found in excavations have been shown to date from a medieval reconstruction, there is evidence supporting the use of Roman concrete in the original. Alternatively, the central covering may have been a square groin vault. Fires in 1071 and 1075 damaged the building and the central covering collapsed in 1103. It was rebuilt with a Romanesque dome that lasted until 1573, when it collapsed and was replaced by the present structure. The original vaulting was concealed by a square drum externally rather than the octagon of today, which dates from the 16th century.

The building may have been the church of the nearby imperial palace and a proposed construction between 355 and 374 under the Arian bishop Auxentius of Milan, who later "suffered a kind of damnatio memoriae at the hands of his orthodox successors", may explain the lack of records about it. Or it may have been commissioned as a mausoleum by Stilicho when he served as regent for Honorius. Two late medieval texts, Quaternus indulgentiarum (middle of the fourteenth century) and Antonio Confalonieri's Chronica pontificum (early fifteenth century), document a traditional date for the consecration of the church as the year 416. Thermoluminescence and radiocarbon dating indicate construction began sometime between 390 and 410, using a significant proportion of recycled bricks.

The chapel of Sant'Ippolito was built with the original San Lorenzo building and its dome appears to have used interlocking amphorae, rather than vaulting tubes, but it was rebuilt in 1916. The original crossing vault was probably a dome on pendentives. The Chapel of San Aquilino was built between 400 and 420. The brick octagonal cloister vault of the chapel of San Aquilino had one groin reinforced with interlocking amphorae, a fifth century technique. It begins as a pavilion vault at its base and becomes hemispherical at the top. The dome of the chapel of San Sisto, on the north side of the building, appears to have been first built in the early sixth century as a half-sized copy of San Aquilino, perhaps with a dwarf gallery, but it was rebuilt in the 17th century.

The last imperial domed mausoleum in the city of Rome was that of Emperor Honorius, built in 415 next to St. Peter's Basilica. It was demolished in 1519 as part of the rebuilding of St. Peter's, but had a dome 15.7 meters wide and its appearance is known from some drawings.

== Theodosius II ==
An aisled tetraconch in Perga that may have been domed was built between 400 and the middle of the 5th century.

Early examples of Byzantine domes existed over the hexagonal hall of the Palace of Antiochos, the hexagon at Gülhane, the martyium of Sts. Karpos and Papylos, and the rotunda at the Myrelaion. The timber-roofed basilica of Ilissos in Athens had a dome over its sanctuary. The 5th century St. Mary's church in Ephesus had small rectangular side rooms with sail vaults made of arched brick courses. The brick dome of the baptistery at St. Mary's was composed of a series of tightly arched meridional sections. The Church of Saint Simeon Stylites likely had a wooden polygonal dome over its central 27-meter (89 ft) wide octagon.

Small brick domes are also found in towers of Constantinople's early 5th century land walls. Underground cisterns in Constantinople, such as the Cistern of Philoxenos and the Basilica Cistern, were composed of a grid of columns supporting small domes, rather than groin vaults. The square bay with an overhead sail vault or dome on pendentives became the basic unit of architecture in the early Byzantine centuries, found in a variety of combinations.

== Valentinian III ==
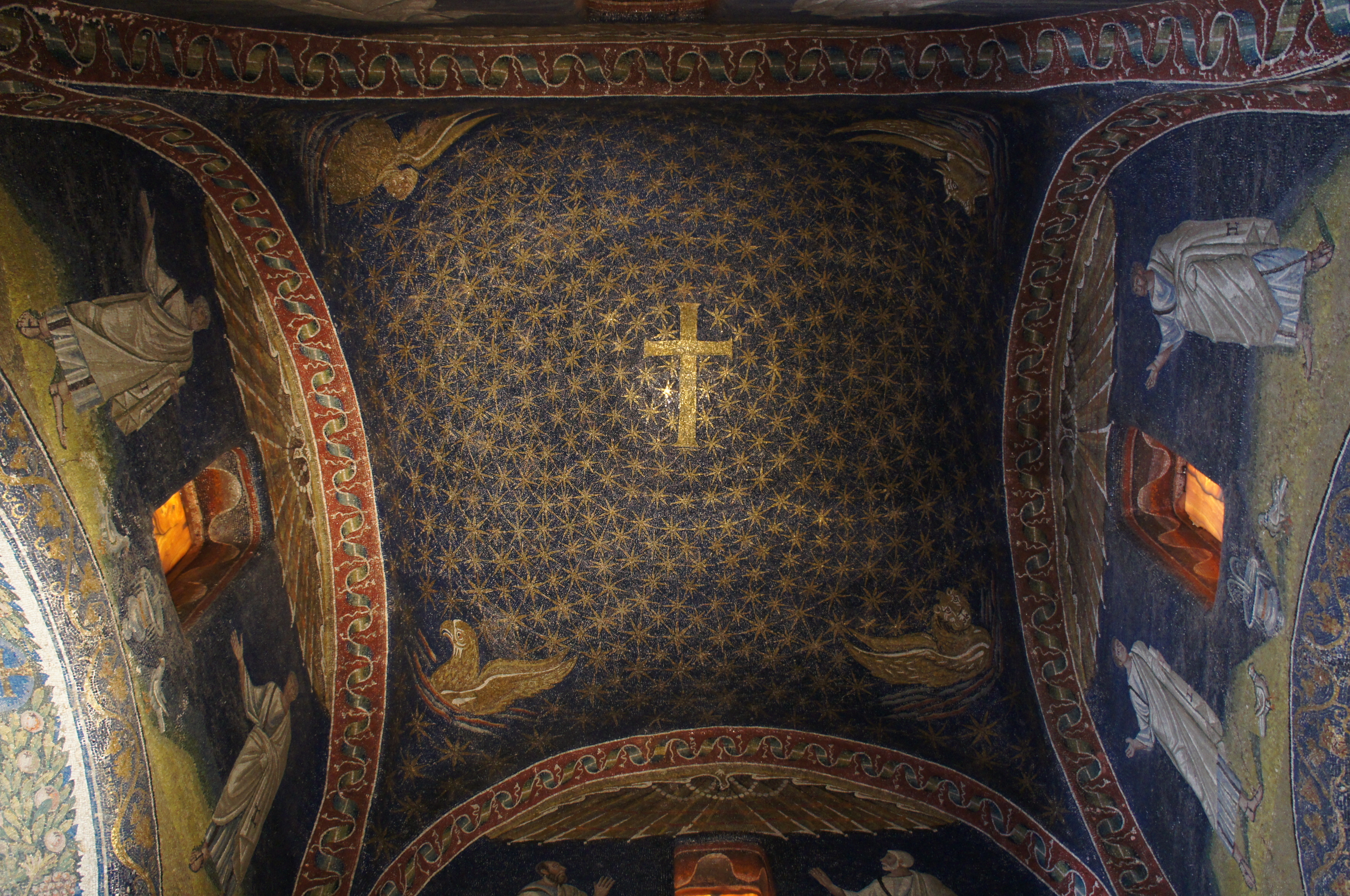
The Mausoleum of Galla Placidia in Ravenna

By the 5th century, structures with small-scale domed cross plans existed across the Christian world. Examples include the Mausoleum of Galla Placidia, the martyrium attached to the Basilica of San Simpliciano, and churches in Macedonia and on the coast of Asia Minor. In Italy, the Baptistery of San Giovanni in Naples and the Church of Santa Maria della Croce in Casarano have surviving early Christian domes. In Tolentino, the mausoleum of Catervus was modeled on the Pantheon, but at one-quarter scale and with three protruding apses, around 390–410. The Baptistery of Neon in Ravenna was completed in the middle of the 5th century and there were 5th century domes in the baptisteries at Padula and Novara.

The 5th century domes of the Baptistery of Neon in Ravenna, St. Vittore in Ciel d’Oro at the Basilica of Sant'Ambrogio in Milan, and the Lateran Baptistery in Rome were built using ceramic vaulting tubes. Initially completed with a timber truss roof in the early 5th century, the 9.6 meter span Baptistery of Neon was reroofed in the middle of the 5th century with a thin dome about 25 cm thick made of two layers of vaulting tubes. The walls were extended higher and a truss roof built over the dome.

== Leo I ==
In Jerusalem, Sion Church was built with a wooden dome between 456 and 460. The Church of the Kathisma was built along the road from Jerusalem to Bethlehem around 456 with an octagonal plan. It was built over the site of a rock said to be used as a seat by the Virgin Mary as she traveled to Bethlehem while pregnant with Jesus, corresponding to a story told in the Protoevangelium of James. The outer diameter was similar to that of the Church of the Holy Sepulchre at 26–27 meters, and the innermost octagon supported a dome 15.5 meters wide.

== See also ==
- List of Roman domes
- History of architecture
