= Misket Cherven =

Variety of grape

- Grape (Vitis)
- Color of berry skin: Pink
- Species: Vitis vinifera
- Also called: See list
- Origin: Bulgaria
- VIVC number: 17492

Misket Cherven, meaning Red Misket, is a variety of grape used for wine. It is a white wine grape, but has a pinkish skin colour. It is spread in the Sub-Balkan Bulgarian wine regions. It is considered to be an old local variety, cultivated nowadays mainly in the Sungurlare Valley, and the Karlovo and Brezovo districts. There are also smaller plantations in the Stara Zagora, Sliven, Yambol and Vratza districts. The grape variety grows best in hilly, airy regions. The grapes are small and have pinkish-red to violet color. The wine made from Misket Cherven is typically dry. It is straw-yellow in color and often has some green nuance. Varietal Misket wines are typically named by appellation. Best known are Sungurlare Misket and Karlovo Misket, produced in two distinct wine regions in the southern outskirts of the Balkan Mountains. In table wines, Misket Cherven is often blended with Welschriesling and Dimyat.

Misket Cherven is also used as a table grape.

== Synonyms ==
Misket Cherven is also known under the following synonyms: Karlovski Misket, Kimionka, Misket Siv, Misket Starozagorski, Misket Sungurlarski, Misket Tcherven, Miskete Tcherven, Sinja, Temenuga, Sinya Temenuga, Songurlarski Misket, Yuzhnobalgarski Cherven Misket.
