= Domyat =

Domyat may refer to:

- Damietta Governorate, one of the governorates of Egypt
  - Damietta, a port and the capital of the Damietta Governorate in Egypt
  - Damietta SC, an association football club based in Damietta
- Dimyat (wine), a white Bulgarian wine grape
