= Bulgarian wine =

Wine making in Bulgaria

Grape growing and wine production have a long history in Bulgaria, dating back to the times of the Thracians. There is evidence of Bulgarian winemaking since 4000 B.C. Wine is, together with beer and grape rakia, among the most popular alcoholic beverages in the country.

== Viticultural regions ==
A government decree of 13 July 1960 officially divided Bulgaria into five distinct viticultural regions.

=== Danubian Plain (North Bulgarian) ===
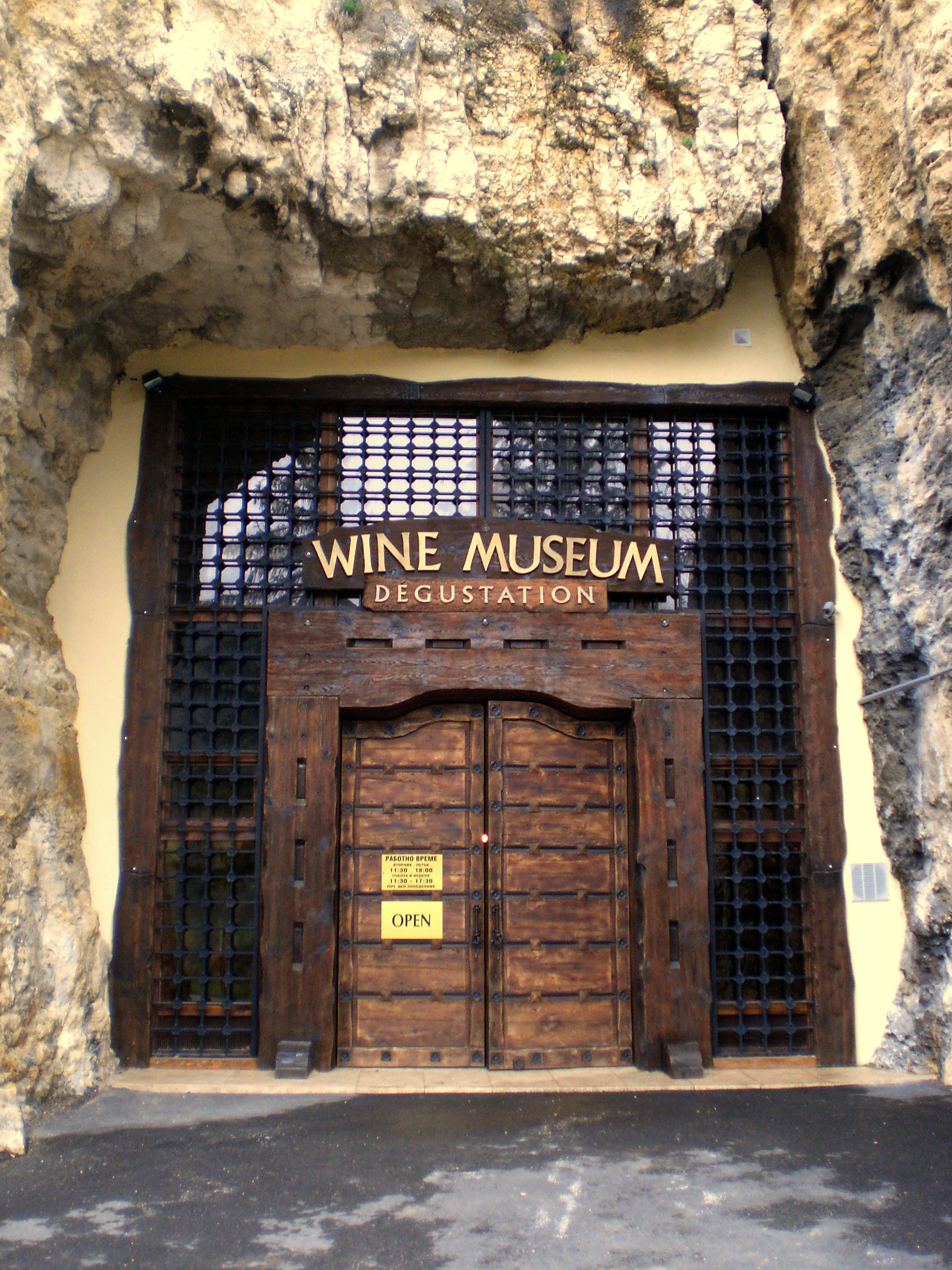
The Wine Museum in Pleven

The Danubian Plain or North Bulgarian region encompasses the south banks of the Danube and the central and western parts of the Danubian Plain. The climate of the area is temperate continental, has a hot summer and many sunny days a year. Typical styles are Muscat Ottonel, Cabernet Sauvignon, Merlot, Chardonnay, Aligoté, Pamid and the local Gamza. In the US appellation also approved as "Danube River Plains" region.

=== Black Sea (East Bulgarian) ===
The Black Sea region is where 30% of all vines are located. The region is characterized by long and mild autumns that are a favourable condition for the accumulation of sugars to make fine white wine (53% of all white wine varietals are concentrated in the region). Wine styles include Dimyat, Riesling, Muscat Ottonel, Ugni blanc, Sauvignon blanc, Traminer, and Gewürztraminer. In the US appellation also approved as "Black Sea Coastal" region.

=== Rose Valley (Sub-Balkan) ===
The Rose Valley region is located south of the Balkan Mountains. It is divided into an eastern and western subregion, with styles such as Muscatel, Riesling, Rkatsiteli, Cabernet Sauvignon and Merlot dominating. The region mostly produces dry and off-dry white wine and less red wine. The region includes the Sungurlare Valley, famous for its wine from the Red Misket grape variety. In the US appellation also approved as "Valley of the Roses" region.

=== Thracian Lowland (South Bulgarian) ===
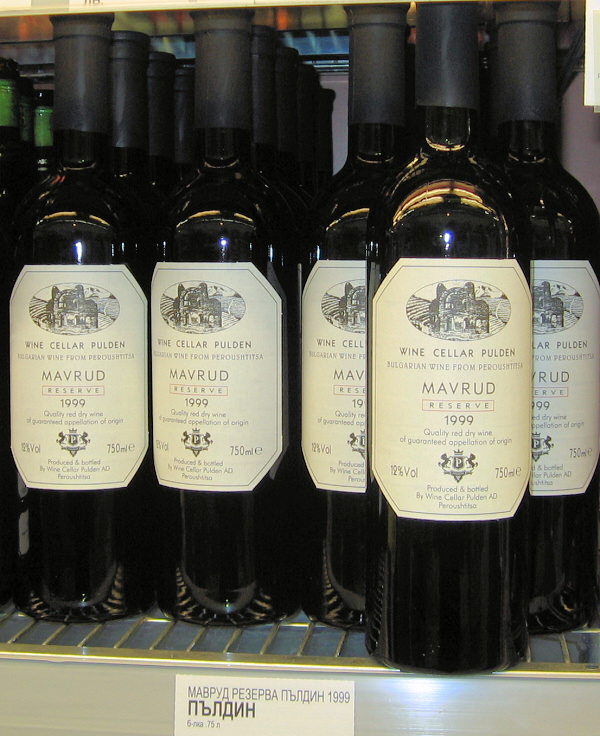
Mavrud is a typical Bulgarian wine variety from Thrace

The temperate continental climate in the area and the favourable distribution of precipitation are good premises for the developed red wine growing in the lowlands of Upper Thrace. The region includes the central part of the lowland, as well as parts of the Sakar mountain. Mavrud, a famous local wine, as well as Merlot, Cabernet Sauvignon, Muscatel and Pamid are grown.

The Balkan Mountains serve to block the cold winds blowing from the plains of Russia, and the region to the south of the Balkans, the valley drained by the Maritsa River, has a Mediterranean climate, with mild, rainy winters and warm, dry summers. In the US appellation also approved as "Thracian Valley" region.

=== Struma River Valley (Southwest Bulgarian) ===
The region includes the southwestern parts of Bulgaria, the valley of the river Struma in the historical region of Macedonia. The area is small in size, but is climatically very distinct and characteristic, owing to the strong Mediterranean influence from the south. The local wine Shiroka Melnishka (taking its name from Melnik), as well as Cabernet Sauvignon and Merlot are cultivated.

== See also ==
- List of Bulgarian wine regions
- Winemaking
- Old World wine
- Agriculture in Bulgaria
