= Red Church (Bulgaria) =

Coordinates: 42°4′27″N 24°33′22″E

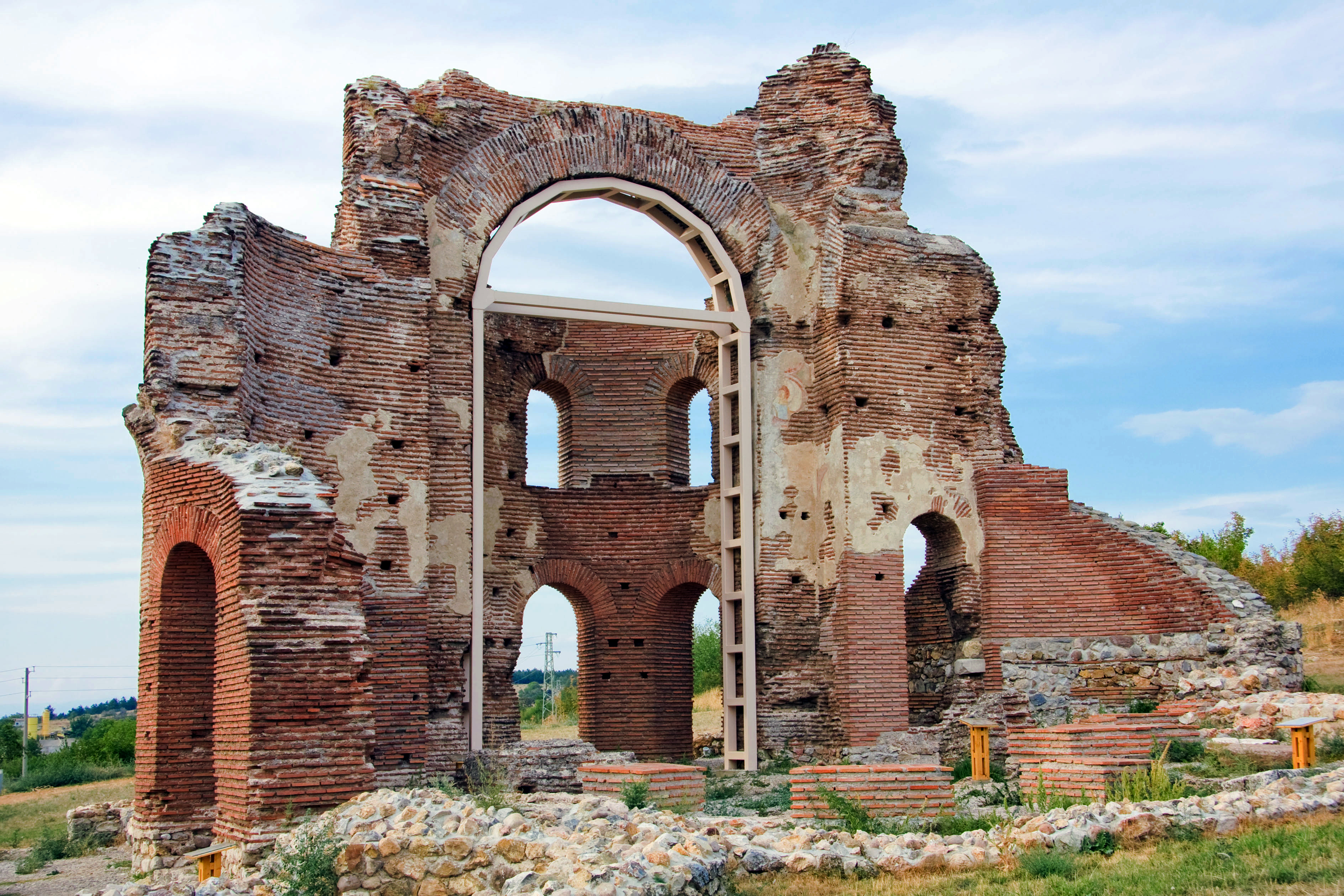
Ruins of the Red Church near Perushtitsa

The Red Church (Bulgarian: Червена църква, Chervena tsarkva, pronounced [tʃɛrˈvɛnɐ ˈtsɤrkvɐ]) is a large partially preserved late Roman (early Byzantine) Christian basilica in south central Bulgaria. Dating to the late 5th–early 6th century, the church stands near the town of Perushtitsa in western Plovdiv Province, some 15 kilometres (9.3 mi) southwest of the city of Plovdiv. The Red Church is a rare example of solid brick construction in a church from Late Antiquity in Bulgaria, and it was the red colour of the bricks that gave the church its name.

== History and architecture ==
Probably built under Emperor Anastasius I (491–518), the Red Church originally measured 32.70 by 25.90 metres (107.3 by 85.0 ft). The northern wall, the best preserved, reaches around 14 m (46 ft) in height. The church features four semi-domes, a narthex and an outer narthex (exonarthex). The symmetry of the building is disrupted by a baptistery with a piscina attached to the northern wall of the narthex and a chapel located under the semi-dome of the church's south side. The piscina in the baptistery was faced with pink marble. The church was originally domed, but hardly any of the dome has been preserved.

The floor of the church was covered with mosaics and the interior was decorated with frescoes. The early murals of the Red Church illustrate the gradual shift from complex mosaics to frescoes in the interior decoration of Christian churches which was taking place at the time. Some decoration is preserved in the National Historical Museum in Sofia. Though now lost, part of those early frescoes were the apocryphal scenes of the flight of Elizabeth and the murder of Zechariah, John the Baptist's parents.

The Red Church is thought originally to have been a martyr's mausoleum (martyrium) which housed the remains of a popular saint. The church underwent reconstruction in the Early Middle Ages. In the 10th–11th century, several of the side passages were sealed off using bricks from the church itself, and the space in front of the apse was isolated by means of double fencing. The necropolis around the church has been dated to the Middle Ages as well, and it was in that period that the second layer of frescoes was added.

The Red Church was first excavated in 1915 by Bulgarian archaeologists. The outbreak of World War I delayed any further research until 1921, when excavations were continued by the Bulgarian Archaeological Institute with the financial aid of American Byzantinist Thomas Whittemore. Due to structural damage, the church was stabilized with wood scaffolding in 1985. In 2013, the site was reopened after a renovation project made possible by substantial funding from the European Council. The wooden scaffolding was replaced with metal beams, structural enhancements made, and a visitor's centre constructed.

Along with the Hagia Sophia Church in Sofia and the Old Bishopric in Nesebar, the Red Church stands as one of only three preserved brick churches from that period of the history of Bulgaria. Solid brickwork was generally rare and to be seen in buildings constructed from the 5th to the 12th century in Byzantium and Byzantine-influenced areas. Architecture historian Margarita Koeva considers the church one of the prime examples of the changes which ensued in the modern Bulgarian lands following the Edict of Milan of 313.

== Gallery ==
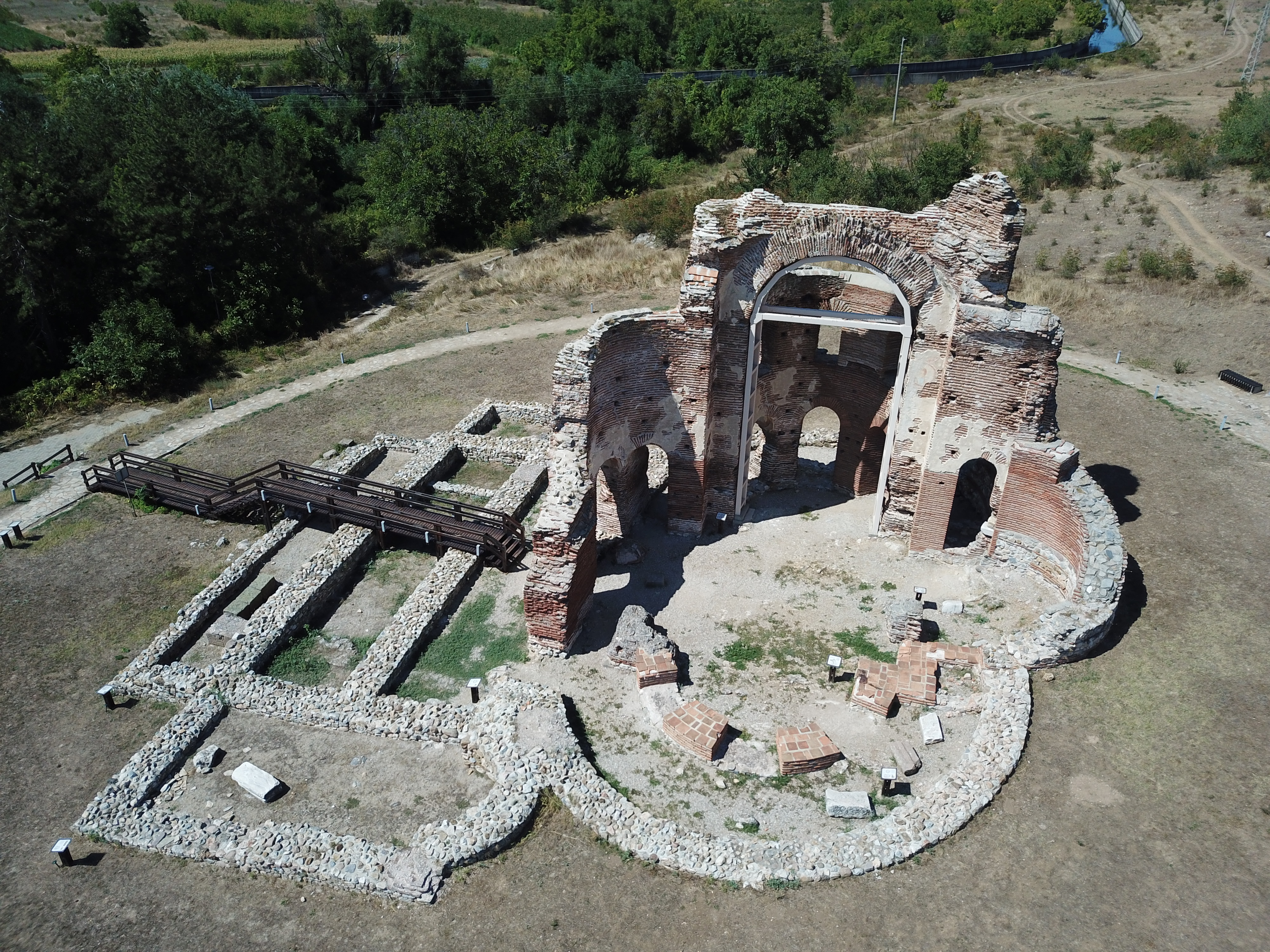
Aerial view

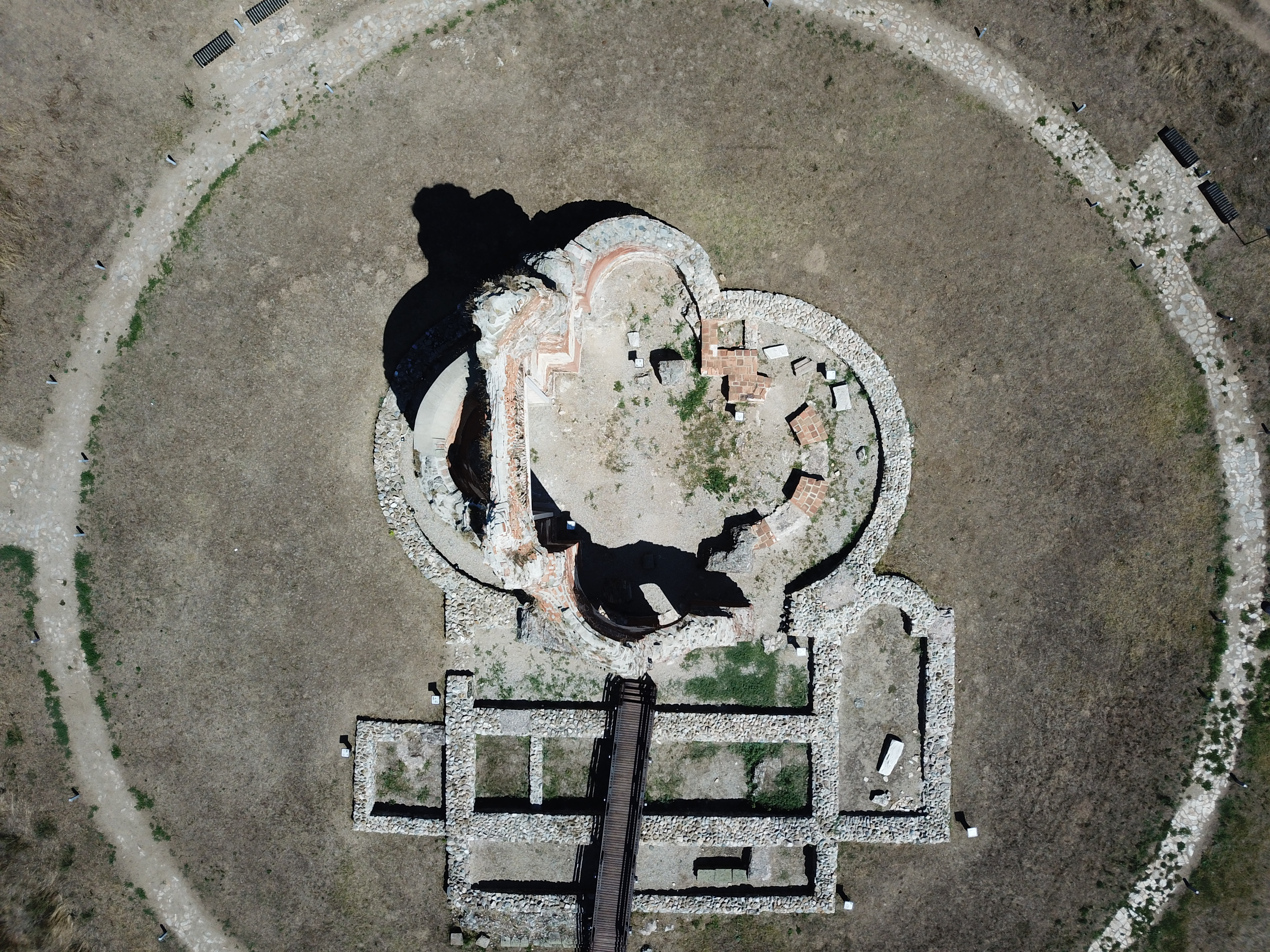
Plan

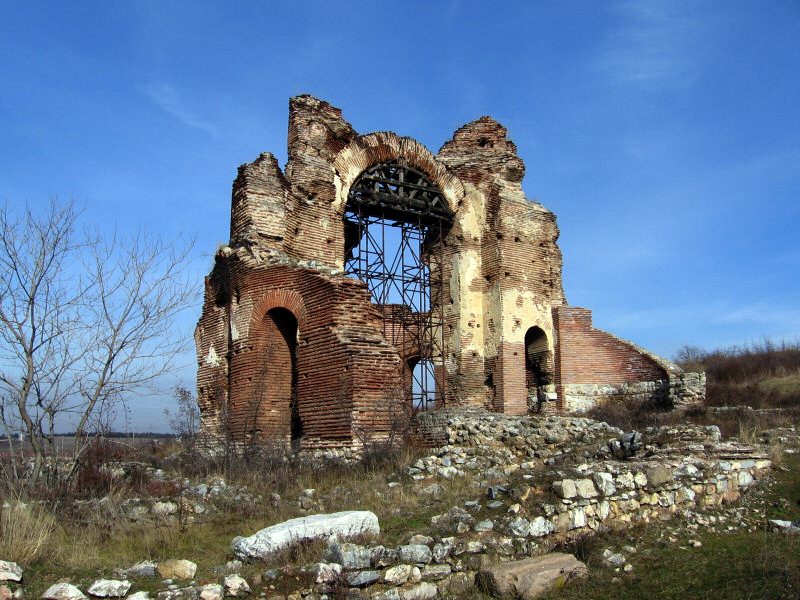
Before restoration

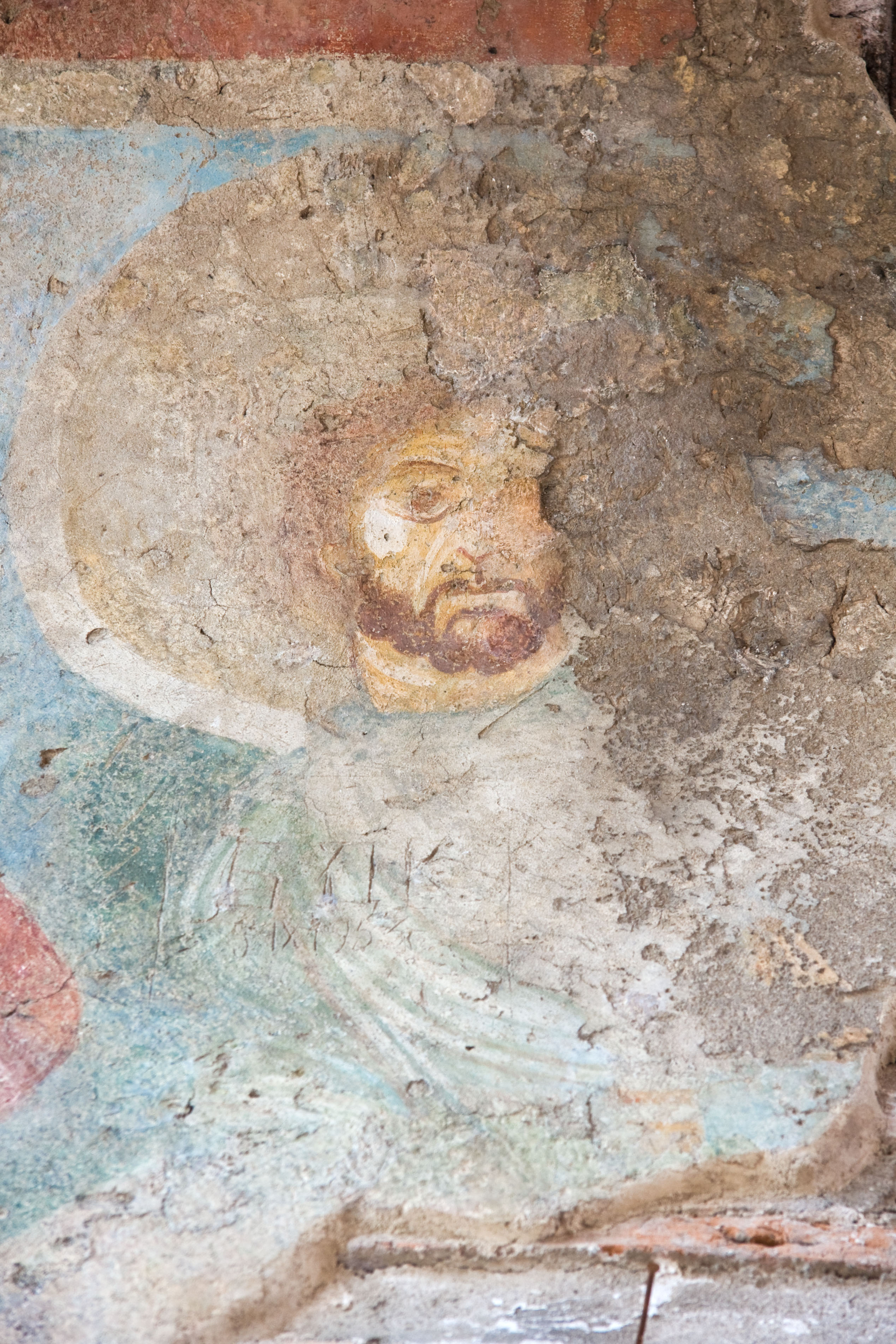
A damaged fresco

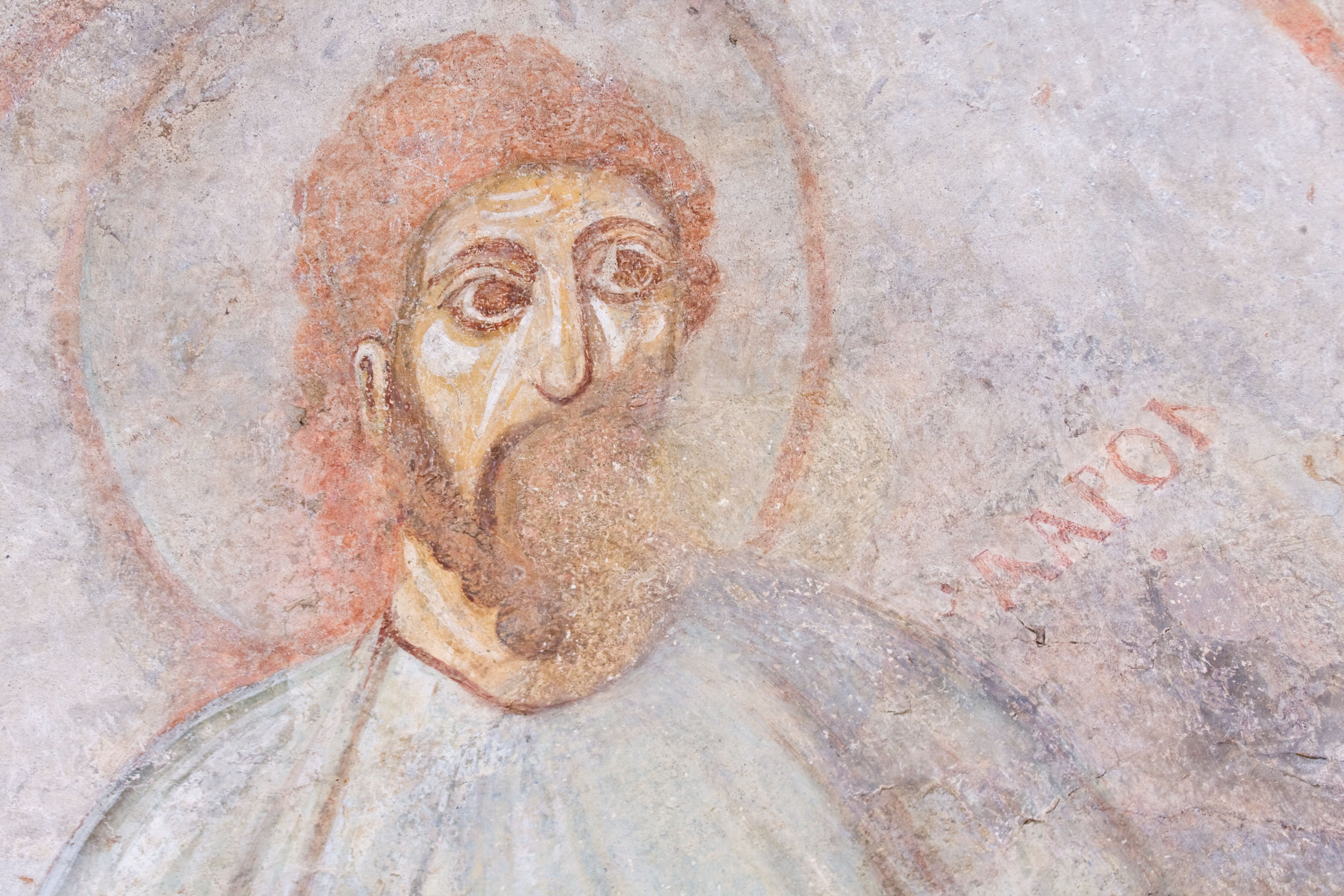
Early fresco in the northwestern conch depicting Aaron. Discovered when newer layers were removed in recent restoration work.

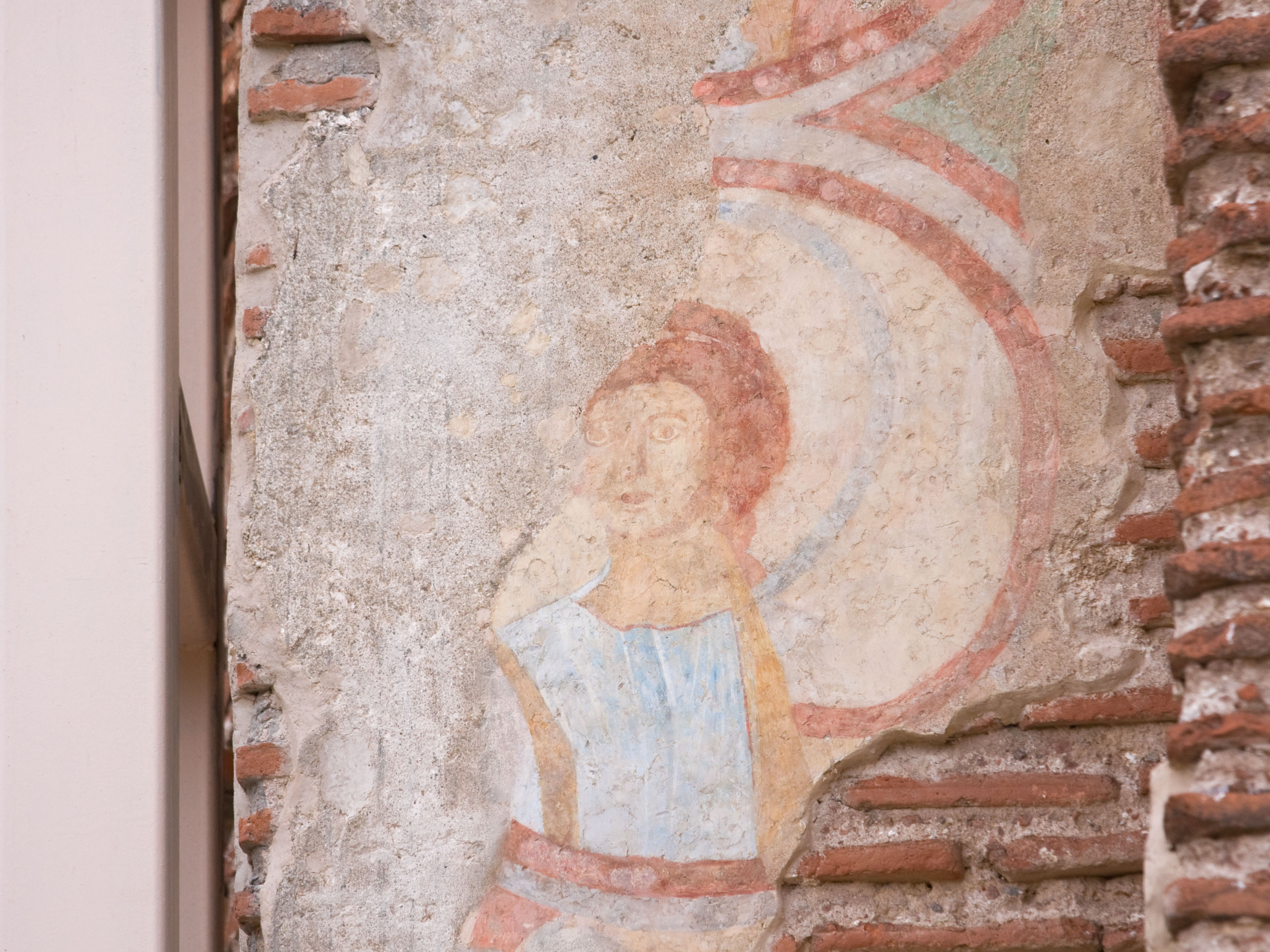
Medallion with angel's head, to right of north arch. It is thought 18 similar medallions decorated the eastern arch.
