= Perushtitsa =

City in Plovdiv Province, Bulgaria

Coordinates: 42°03′N 24°33′E

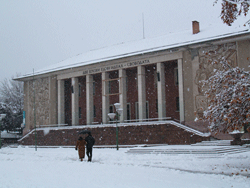
Townhall of Perushtitsa, the cultural centrum – "2 epochs, 1 goal: liberty"

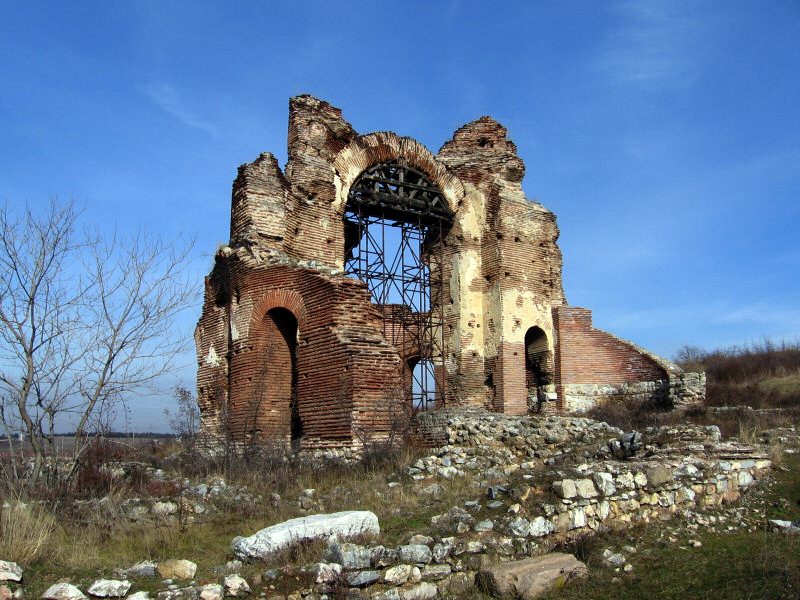
The Red Church near Perushtitsa.

Perushtitsa (Bulgarian: Перущица [ˈpɛruʃtit͡sɐ]) or Perushtitza is a Bulgarian town located in Perushtitsa Municipality, Plovdiv Province at the foot of the Rhodopes, 22 kilometers south of Plovdiv.

The name Perushtitsa comes from the word Peristitsa, which in turn comes from the name of the God Perun.

The town is famous throughout Bulgaria for the fight that took place there in 1876 during the April Uprising against the Ottoman reign. During the suppression of the uprising by Turkish irregulars, the majority of the residents were slaughtered. The French journalist Ivan de Woestyne, who visited the town in July 1876, reported for the newspaper Le Figaro that out of a population of about 2000 only 150 elders and children were left. Lady Strangford arrived from Britain later that year with relief for the people of Bulgaria following the massacres. She built a hospital at Batak and later other hospitals were built including at Perushtitsa.

Perushtitsa is one of the few places in Bulgaria where Mavrud grapes are grown for a typical Bulgarian wine Mavrud.

The remains of the Red Church date from the 5th or 6th century and are a symbol for the city of Perushtitsa. They are located 2 km northeast of Perushtitsa.

There is a multi functional sports complex "Perushtitsa" (at coordinates 42.061396, 24.553302) which can be used for 14 sports – basketball, handball, volleyball, football, badminton, table tennis, body building, and others.

== Gallery ==
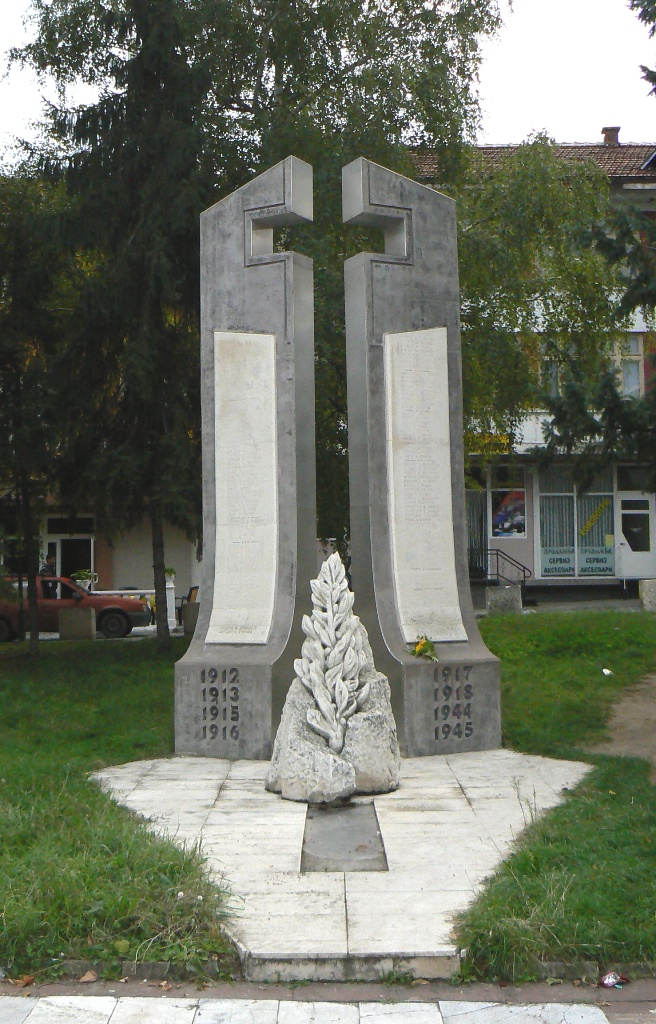
Wars victims monument in Perushtitsa, Bulgaria

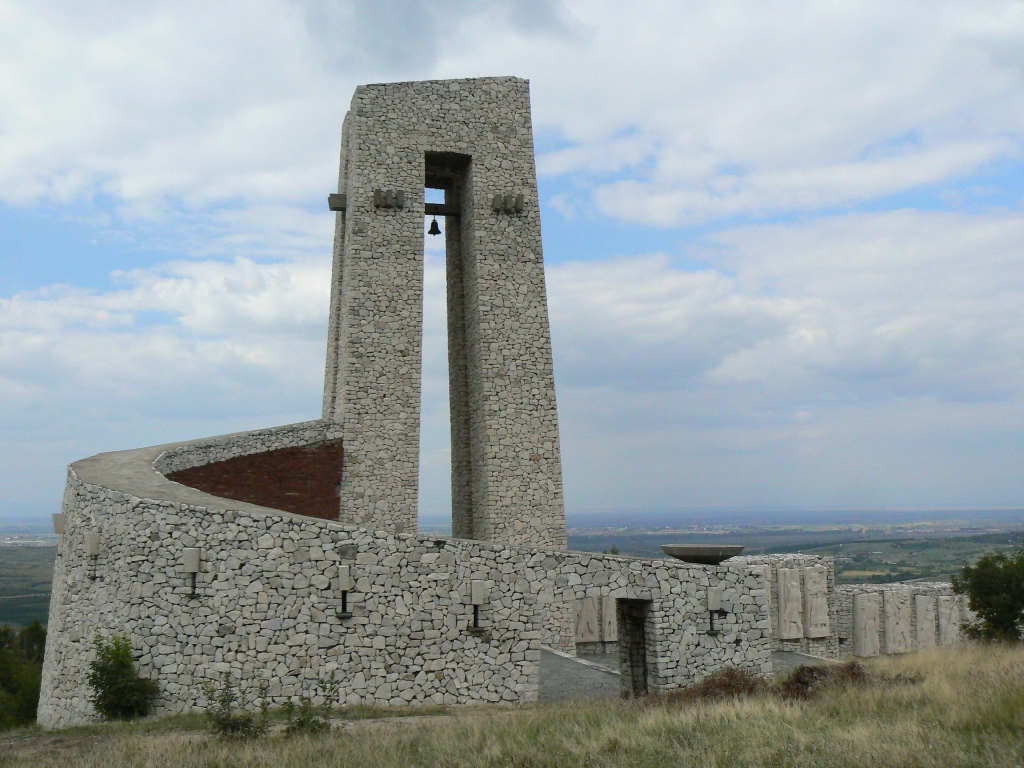
"The Monument of three generations" was erected in 1976 to mark the centennial of The April uprising.

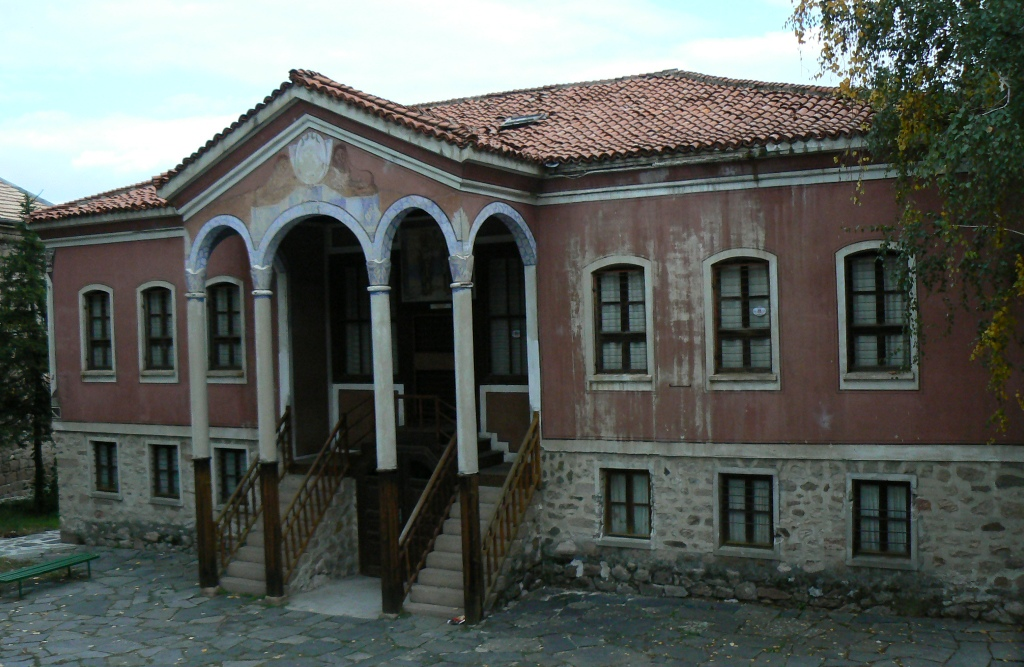
The art gallery of Perushtitsa.

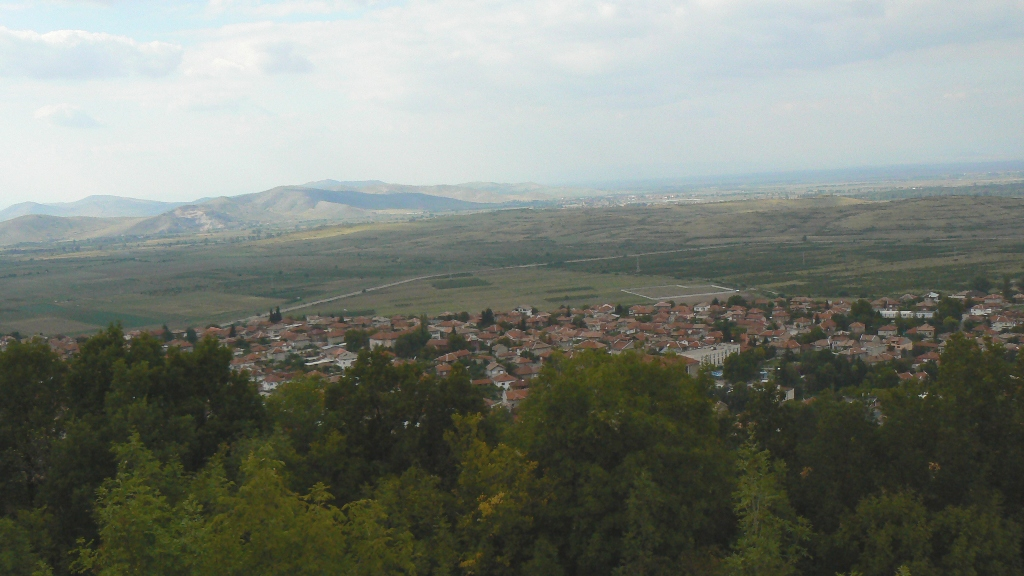
Perushtitsa as seen from the heights.

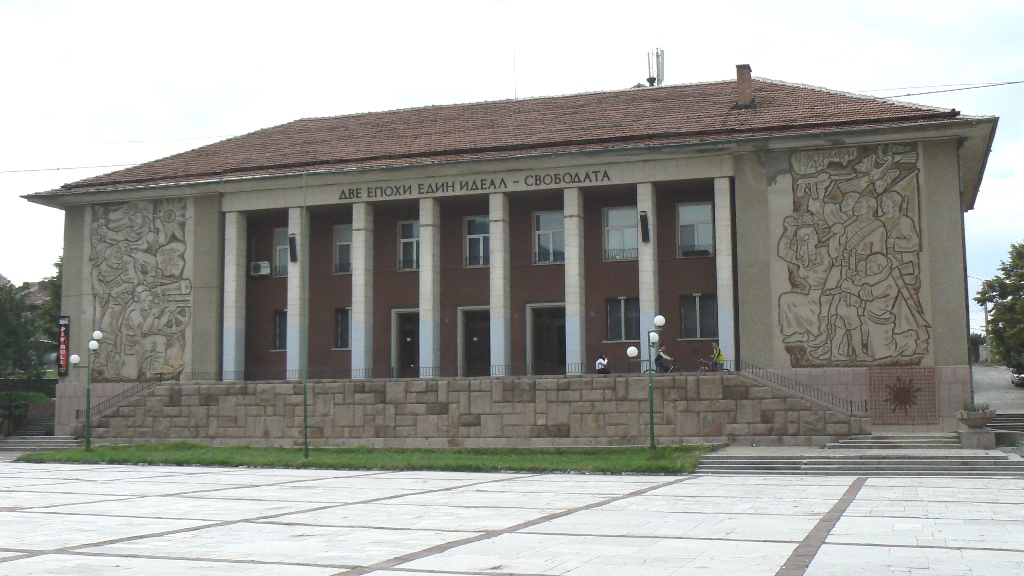
House of culture “Prosveta” in Perushtitsa was founded in 1862 by Bulgarian revolutionary Peter Bonev.

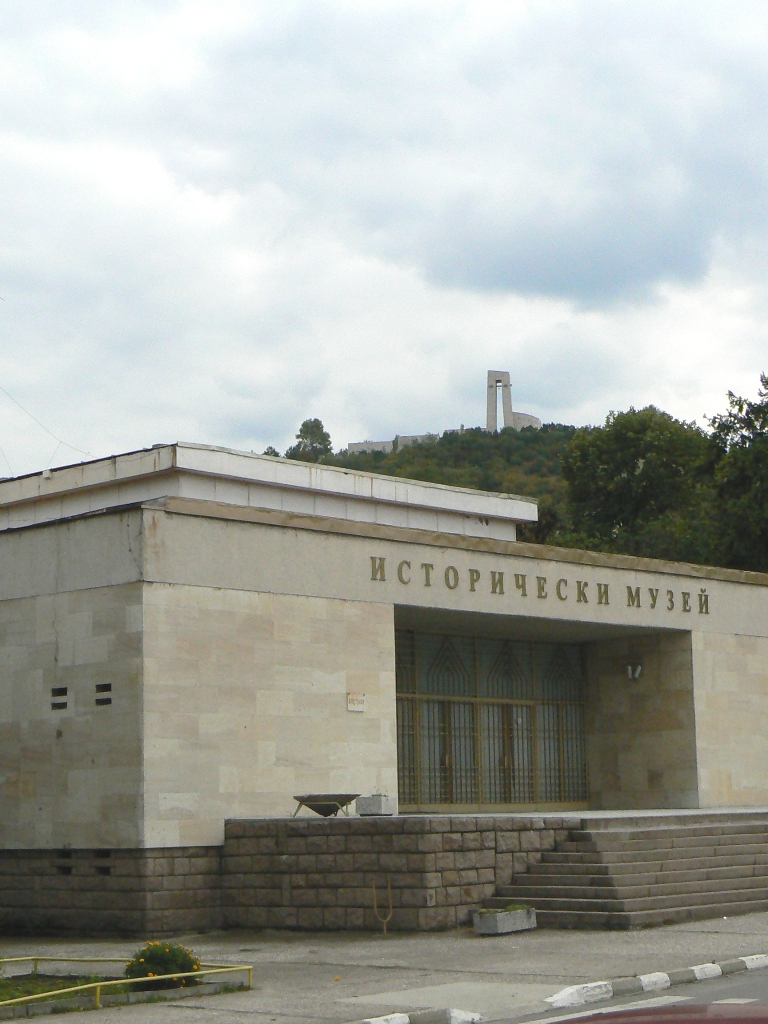
Historical Museum of Perushtitca
