= Lateran Baptistery =

- Battistero lateranense
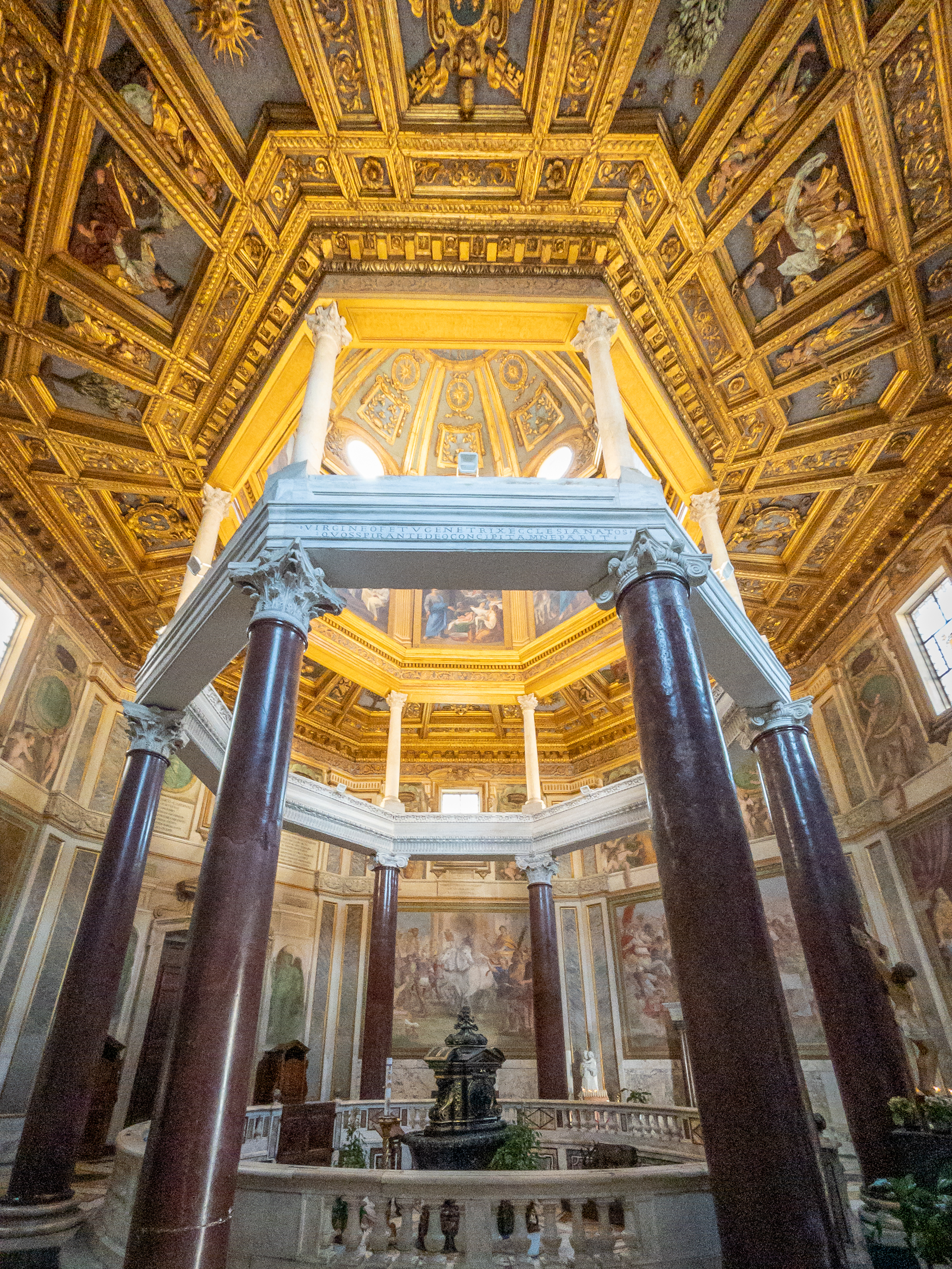
- Wide angle photo of interior
- Click on the map for a fullscreen view.
- 41°53′10.14″N 12°30′15.44″E
- Location: Rome
- Country: Italy

Architecture
- Architectural type: Baptistery
- Groundbreaking: 440

The Lateran Baptistery (Italian: Battistero lateranense, also known as San Giovanni in Fonte or San Giovanni in Onda) stands apart from the Archbasilica of Saint John Lateran, Rome, to which it has become joined by later construction. This baptistery was founded by Pope Sixtus III in 440, perhaps on an earlier structure, for a legend grew up that Constantine the Great had been baptized there and enriched the structure. However, it is more likely that if he was baptized it was in the Eastern part of the Roman Empire and possibly by an Arian bishop. This baptistry was for many generations the only baptistery in Rome, and its domed octagonal structure, centered upon the large octagonal basin for full immersions, provided a model for others throughout Italy, and even an iconic motif of illuminated manuscripts, "The Fountain of Life".

Around the central area, where is the basin of the font, an octagon is formed by eight porphyry columns, with marble Corinthian capitals and entablature of classical form. On the ceiling of the Baptistry is the story of the Battle of the Milvian Bridge (312 AD). An ambulatory surrounds the font and outer walls form a larger octagon. Attached to one side, towards the Lateran Basilica, is a fine porch with two porphyry columns and richly carved capitals, bases and entablatures.

The Baptistery was subject to an elaborate restoration during the pontificate of Pope Urban VIII. While its interior architecture was consolidated and embellished after plans of Gian Lorenzo Bernini around 1633, a fresco cycle with scenes from the life of Constantine was added by Andrea Sacchi on the walls of the ambulatory.

In the meantime the early Christian liturgy of Easter baptisms was reanimated by the Baroque popes, baptizing adult "turchi ed ebrei" ("Turks and Jews") in a public ceremony on Easter eve.

Its plain brick exterior was embellished with a frieze designed by Francesco Borromini in the late 1650s or early 1660s, incorporating the arms of Pope Alexander VII.

== Gallery ==
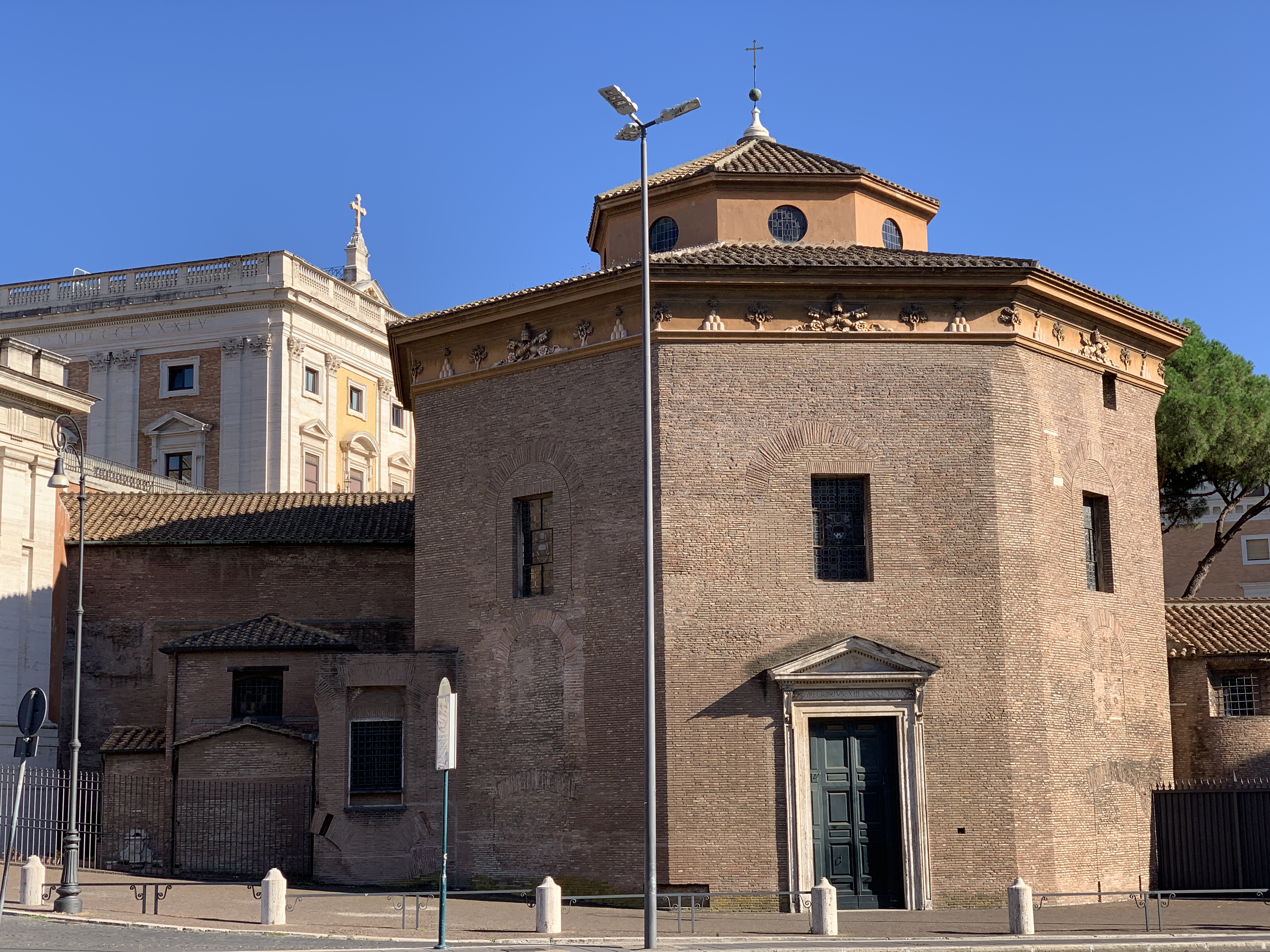
Exterior

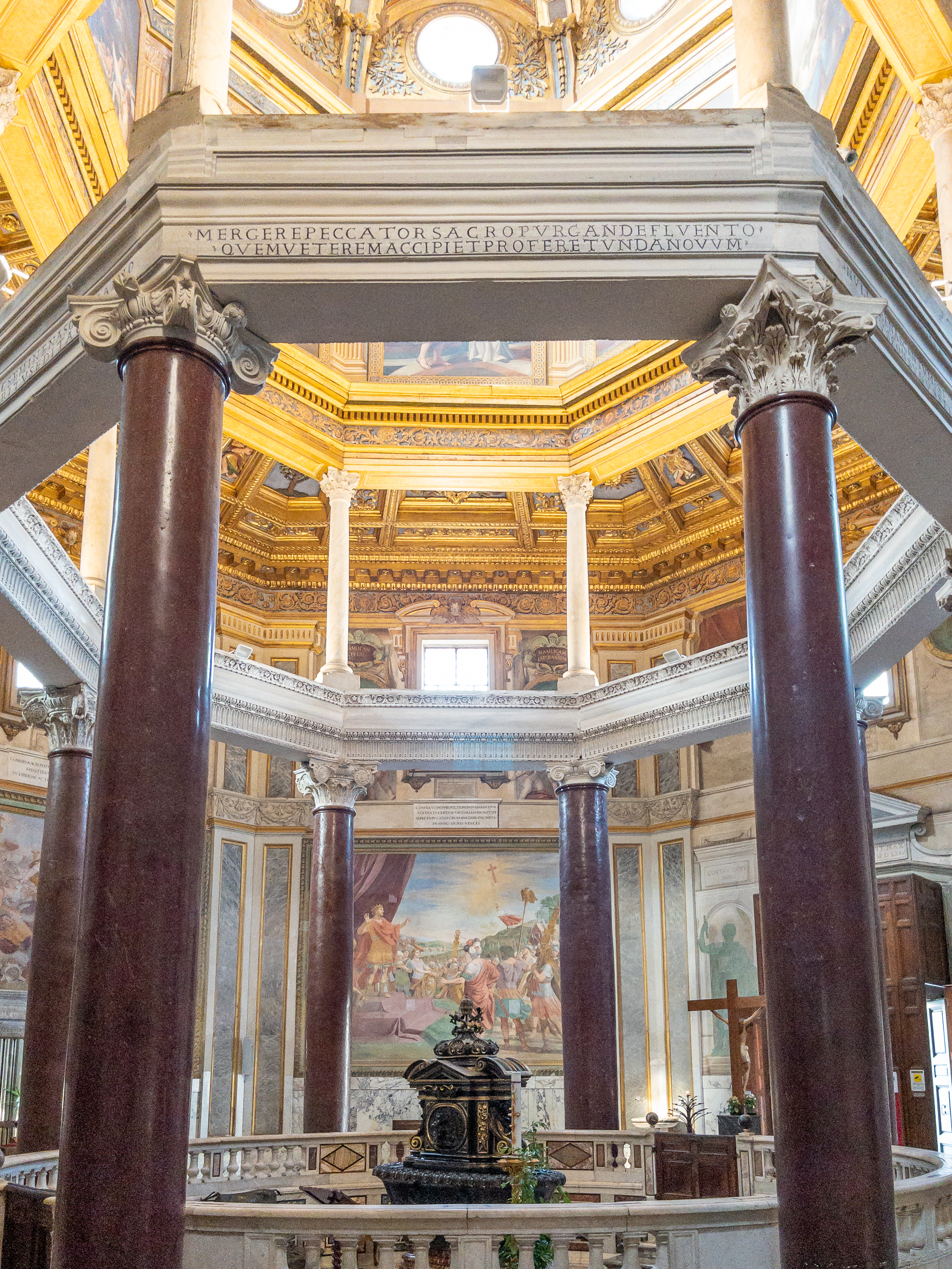
Interior

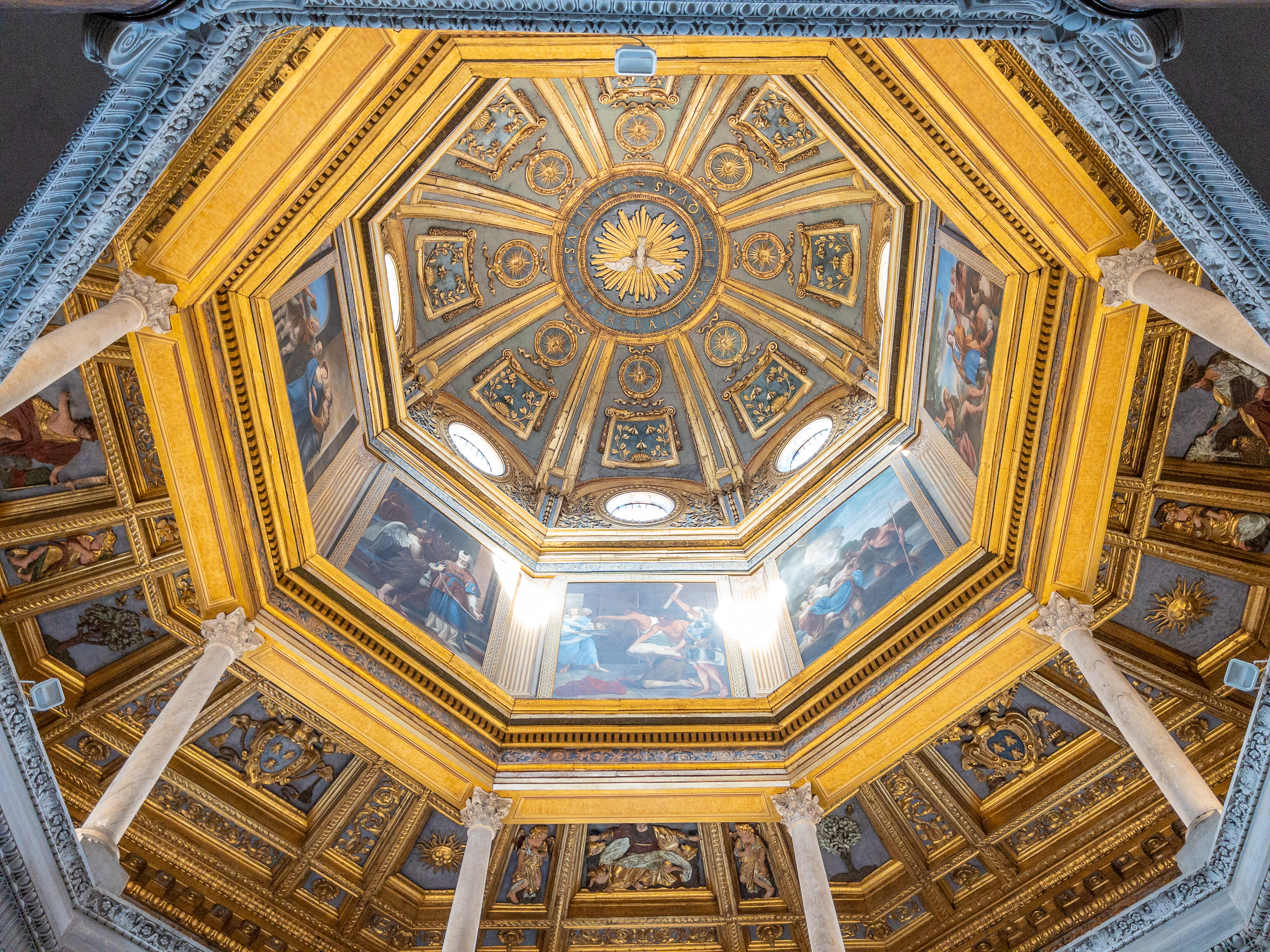
Dome interior

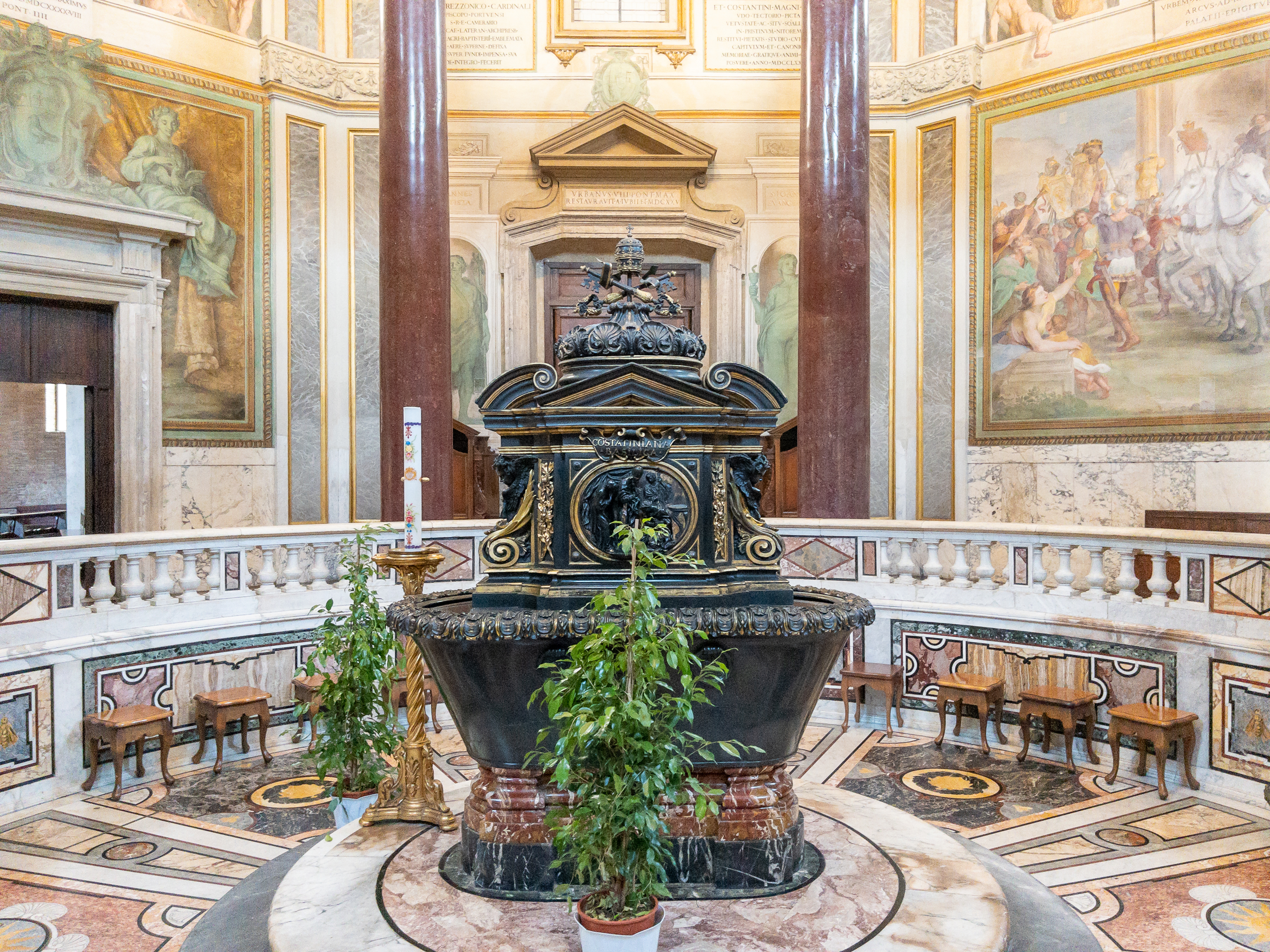
Baptismal font

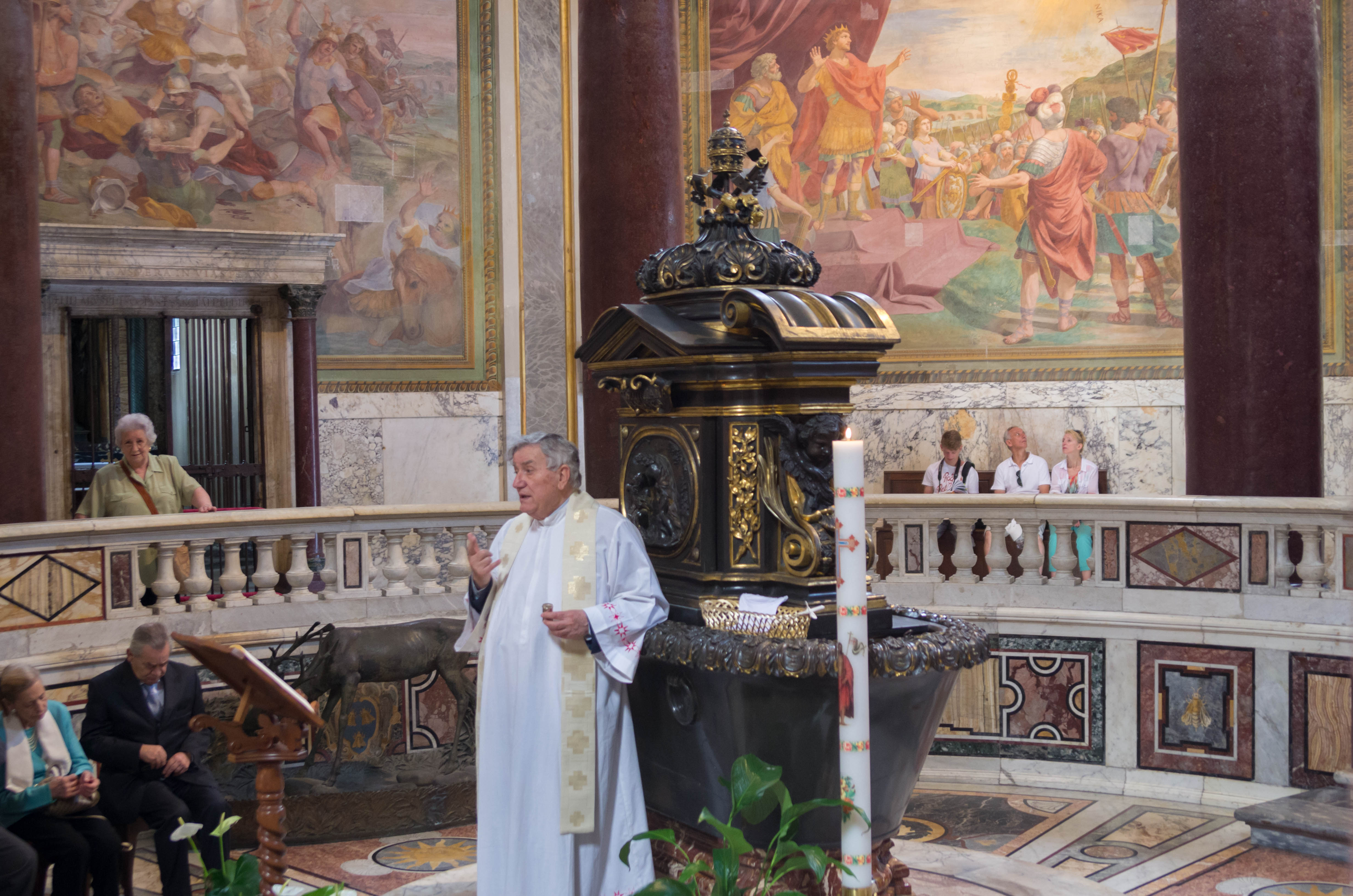
Religious service at baptismal font

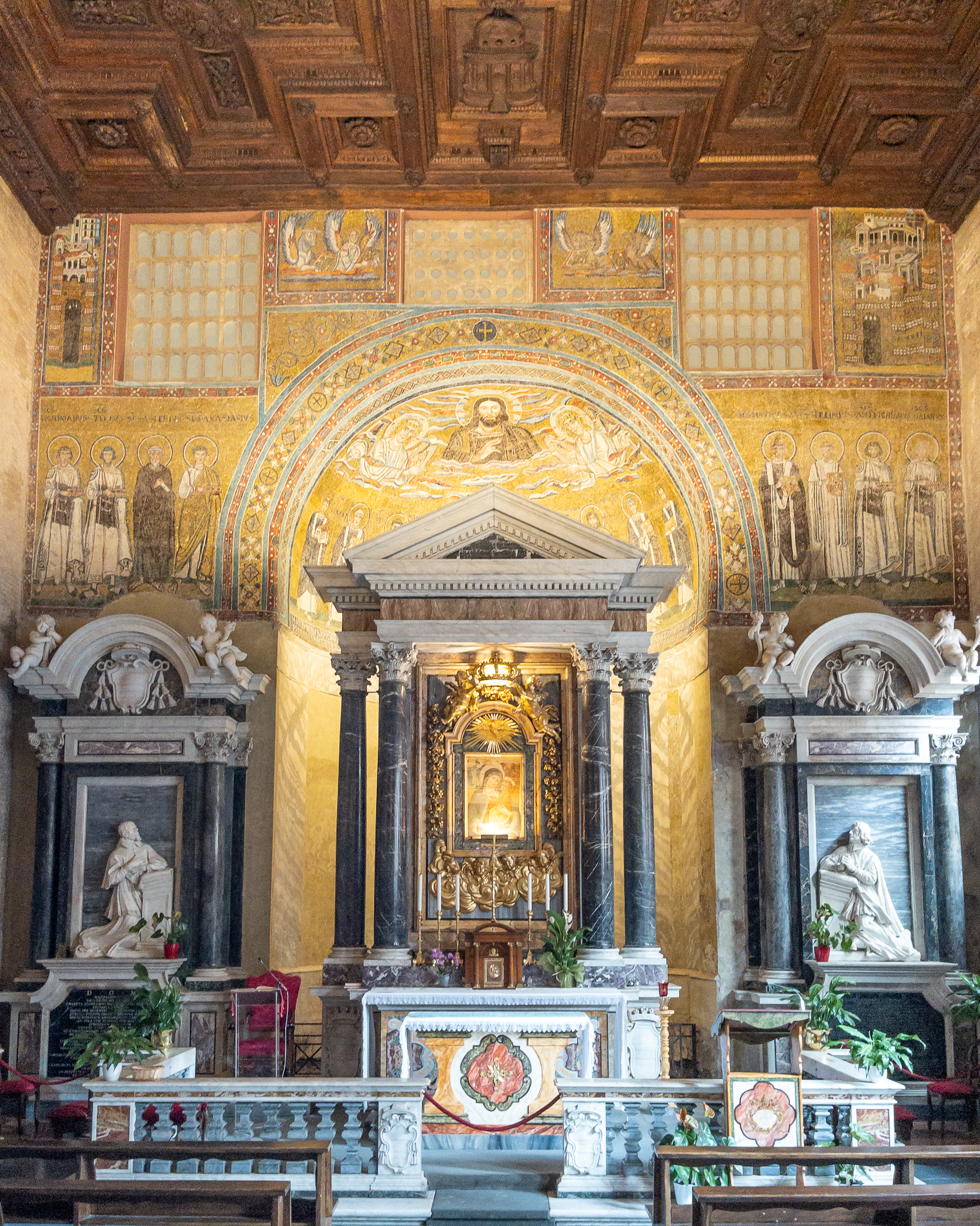
Chapel of San Venanzio

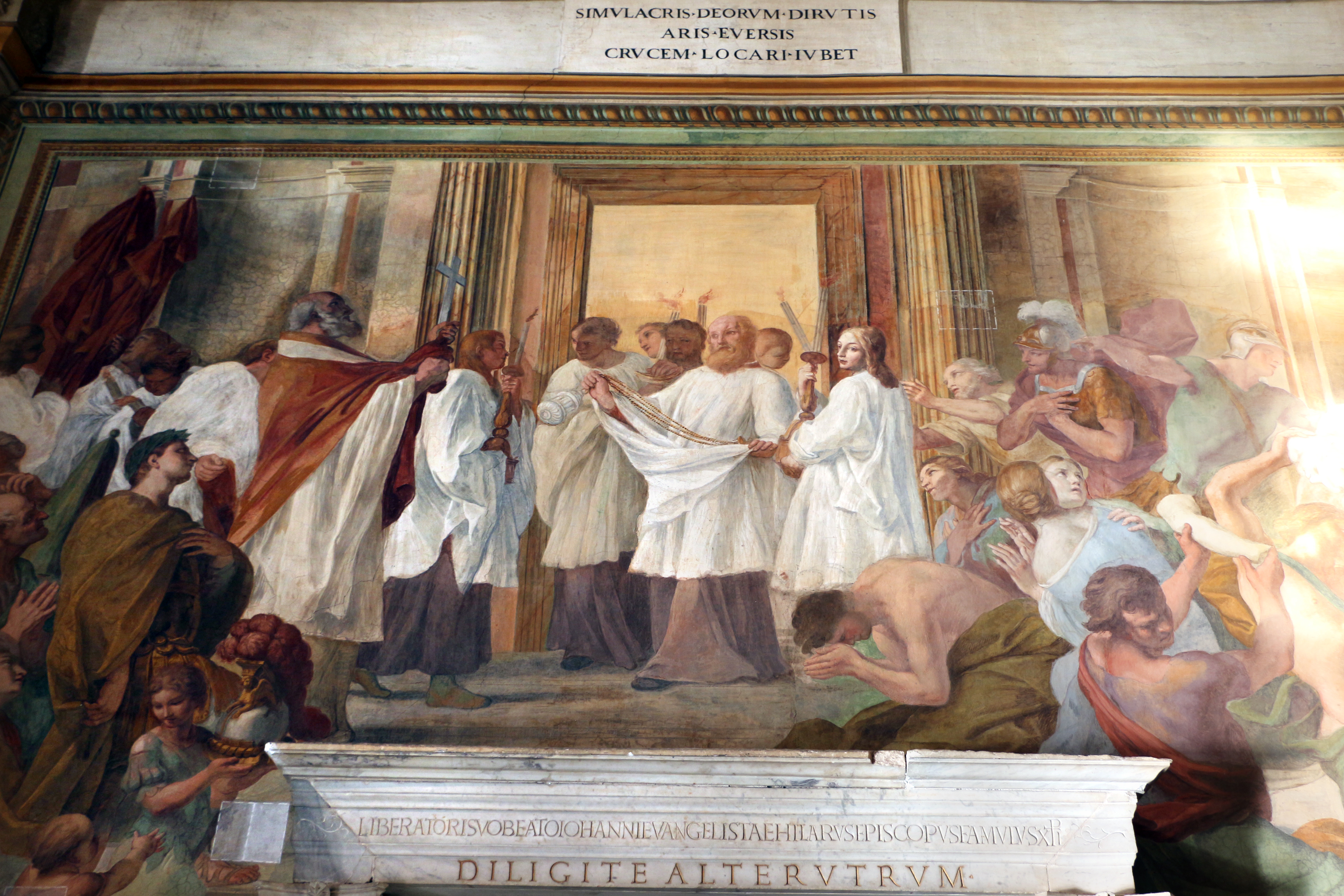
Carlo Maratta, distruzione degli idoli

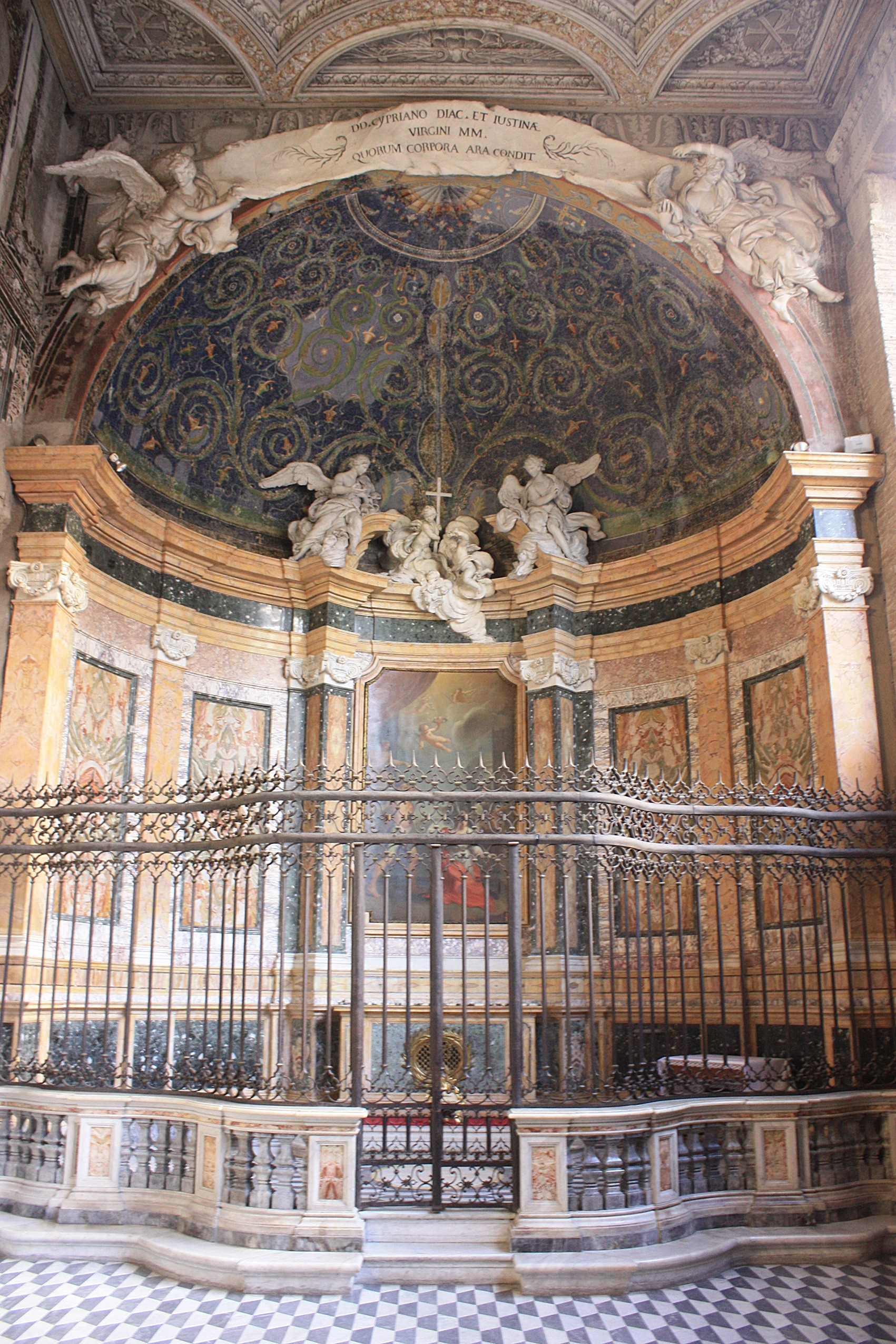
Outside chapel

== See also ==
- Lateran Obelisk
- Ancient Roman and Byzantine domes
