= Dimiat =

Variety of grape

Dimyat
- Grape (Vitis)
- Color of berry skin: Blanc
- Species: Vitis vinifera
- Also called: See list of synonyms
- Origin: Bulgaria
- Notable regions: Black Sea coast
- VIVC number: 5716

Dimyat (Bulgarian: димят) is a white Bulgarian wine grape. It is one of Bulgaria's most widely planted white grape varieties, second only to Rkatsiteli. Wines made from this variety are noted for their perfume aromas. While some ampelographers believe that the variety is indigenous to Bulgaria, legends have developed around Dimiat being named after a city in the Nile Delta and was brought back to Europe by Crusaders in the Middle Ages.

== History ==
The exact origins of the Dimyat grape are unknown, with some ampelographers believing the vine to be native to the Bulgaria area. Recent DNA typing has shown it to be a crossing of Gouais Blanc (Weißer Heunisch) with another, unidentified grape variety. Gouais is a parent of several older European grape varieties. One alternative hypothesis, which is highly improbable given the Gouais parentage, is the legendary tale that the grape was native to the Nile Delta valley (where today there is an Egyptian city with a similar name, Damietta) and was brought back to Thrace by Christian Crusaders.

It is likely that the grape crossed with Riesling to produce the pink-skinned Misket Varnenski grape variety.

== Wine regions ==
The Dimyat grape is almost exclusively grown in Bulgaria with vineyards mostly in the south and eastern parts of the country. It is most widely planted in the Chirpan, Preslav and Shumen regions around the Black Sea. Other Bulgarian wine regions growing some Dimyat include Haskovo and Varna. After Rkatsiteli, it is the second most widely planted white grape variety with over 23,720 acres (9,600 hectares) planted in 2005.

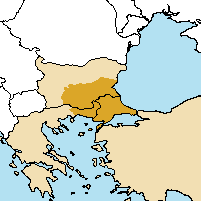
Dimiat is most commonly found in south and eastern Bulgaria, areas that used to be part of the historical region of Thrace.

Outside of Bulgaria, there is small plantings of the variety in the neighbouring Greek wine region of Thraki (part of what was the historical region of Thrace). Here Dimyat is known under its synonym of Zoumiatiko. Smederevka is the 12th most planted grape variety in Serbia, with most planting being in the South Banat (47%) and Three Moravas (24,7%) wine regions.

== Viticulture and winemaking ==
The Dimiat vine is characterized by the large size of the individual grape berries with the potential for high yields if not kept in check. During veraison, the berries turn copper yellow. In addition to being used in the production of table wines, Dimiat is often distilled to produce Bulgarian brandy (rakia).

== Wines ==
Dimiat wines are usually light bodied and very aromatic. The wines are usually made with some level of sweetness ranging from off-dry to very sweet. In Bulgaria, some dessert wines are made from Dimiat. The wine is often served very chilled and is usually consumed young, without much aging.

== Synonyms ==
The various synonyms of Dimiat include-Ahorntraube, Beglerdia, Beglezsia, Bekaszaju, Bekaszölö, Belezsi, Belina, Belina krupna, Belogollandskii, Belogollanskii, Bemena, Bois Jaune, Damiat, Damjat, Damjat bial, Debela lipovina, Dertonia, Dertonija, Dertonilia, Dimiate, Dimjat, Drobna Lipovscina, Dymiat, Fehér Szemendriai, Galan, Koplik, Krupna belina, Laschka, Laska belina, Mana Kuki, Misket de Silven, Misket Slivenski, Nagyvögü, Pamid, Pamit, Parmac, Plovdina, Plovdina esküska, Plovdina eskulska, Saricibuk, Plovdiska, Podbelec, Podbeuz, Radoviska plovdina, Roscara, Rosiora, Saratchobok, Saridzibuk, Semendra, Semendria, Semendru, Senederevka, Smederevka, Smederevka bianca, Smederevka bijela, Smederevka white, Szemendriai féher, Szemendriai Zöld, Szemendrianer, Tök szöllö, Töksölö, Tökszölö, Töröklugas, Wippacher, Wippacher ahornblättrig, Yapalaki, Zarja, Zmedervka, Zoumiatico, Zoumiatis, Zumjat, Zumjatiko and Zumyat.
