= Matnitsa =

Location
- Country: Bulgaria

Physical characteristics
- Source
  - location: Batak Reservoir
  - coordinates: 42°1′14.88″N 24°12′5.04″E
  - elevation: 1,105 m (3,625 ft)
- Mouth
  - location: Chepinska reka
  - coordinates: 42°2′27.96″N 24°0′12.96″E
  - elevation: 735 m (2,411 ft)
- Length: 16.3 km (10.1 mi)
- Basin size: 231 km^{2} (89 sq mi)

Basin features
- Progression: Chepinska reka→ Maritsa

The Matnitsa (Bulgarian: Мътница) is a river in southern Bulgaria, a right tributary river Chepinska reka, itself a right tributary of the Maritsa. Its length is 16 km.

The river takes its source from the Batak Reservoir at an altitude of 1,105 m in the Rhodope Mountains. In the first 2 km it flows to the north-northeast and then takes a turn in western-northwestern direction in a deep forested valley. At the village of Dorkovo it changes direction to the southwest and enters the Chepino Valley, where its valley widens and is farmed. At the town of Kostandovo the Matnitsa turns westwards and in 8 km it flows into the Chepinska reka at an altitude of 735 m to the northeast of the town of Velingrad.

Its river terrace is built up of interbeds of sand, small boulders, sandy clay and fine clay. Due to the subsidence of the Chepino Valley and the rise of the large blocks surrounding it, the mounts of Syutkya, Bozhenets and Snezhanka, the valley of the Matnitsa is of antecedent origin. After Kostandovo, the river bed riverbed is corrected with protective dikes. The river has two main tributaries, both left: the Vrabnitsa and the Rakitovska Stara reka.

Its drainage basin covers a territory of 231 km^{2}.

The Matnitsa has predominantly rain-snow feed with high water in April–May and low water in August–September. The average annual discharge depends on the water outflow from the Batak Reservoir.

The river flows entirely in Pazardzhik Province. There are three settlements along its course: the village of Dorkovo and the town of Kostandovo in Rakitovo Municipality and the town of Velingrad in Velingrad Municipality. The river's waters are utilised for irrigation in Chepino Valley.
