= Tsvetino =

Village in Velingrad Municipality, Pazardzhik Province, Southern Bulgaria

Tsvetino Цветино
- Village
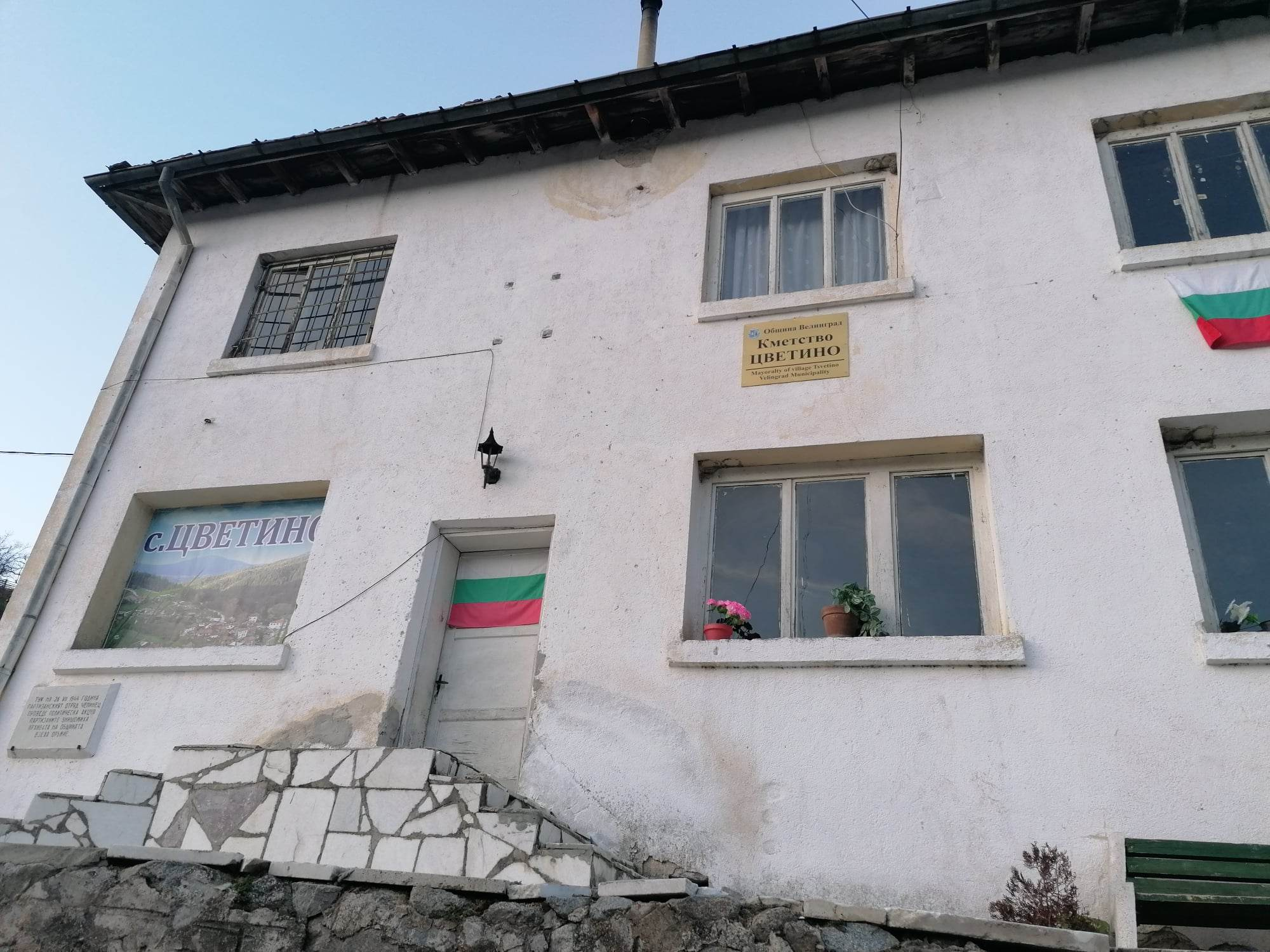

- Location within Bulgaria
- Coordinates: 41°59′32.36″N 23°50′23.85″E

Government
  - Mayor: Plamen Pashaliev

Area
  - Total: 6.82 km^{2} (2.63 sq mi)
- Elevation: 1,031 m (3,383 ft)

Population
  - Total: 131
  - Density: 19.2/km^{2} (49.7/sq mi)
- Time zone: UTC+2 (EET)
  - Summer (DST): UTC+3 (EEST)

Tsvetino (Bulgarian: Цветино) is a village located in Velingrad Municipality, Pazardzhik Province, Southern Bulgaria.

The village of Tsvetino is located in a mountainous area 25 km southwest of Velingrad. Mainly potatoes are grown, due to harsh climate conditions in the area.

== History ==
Tsvetino is considered an old village in the Chepino Valley, as it was first originated as a pastoral settlement. The people came to the village from Macedonia after a plague epidemic, which concludes that the people speak a Macedonian dialect. Until 1979 the village was the centre of a municipality with 35 scattered neighborhoods and huts, and then it became a village with a mayor, even though its under the 350 people requirement.

The old name is Florovo, deriving from the French word fleur, which means flower.
