= Chepinska reka =

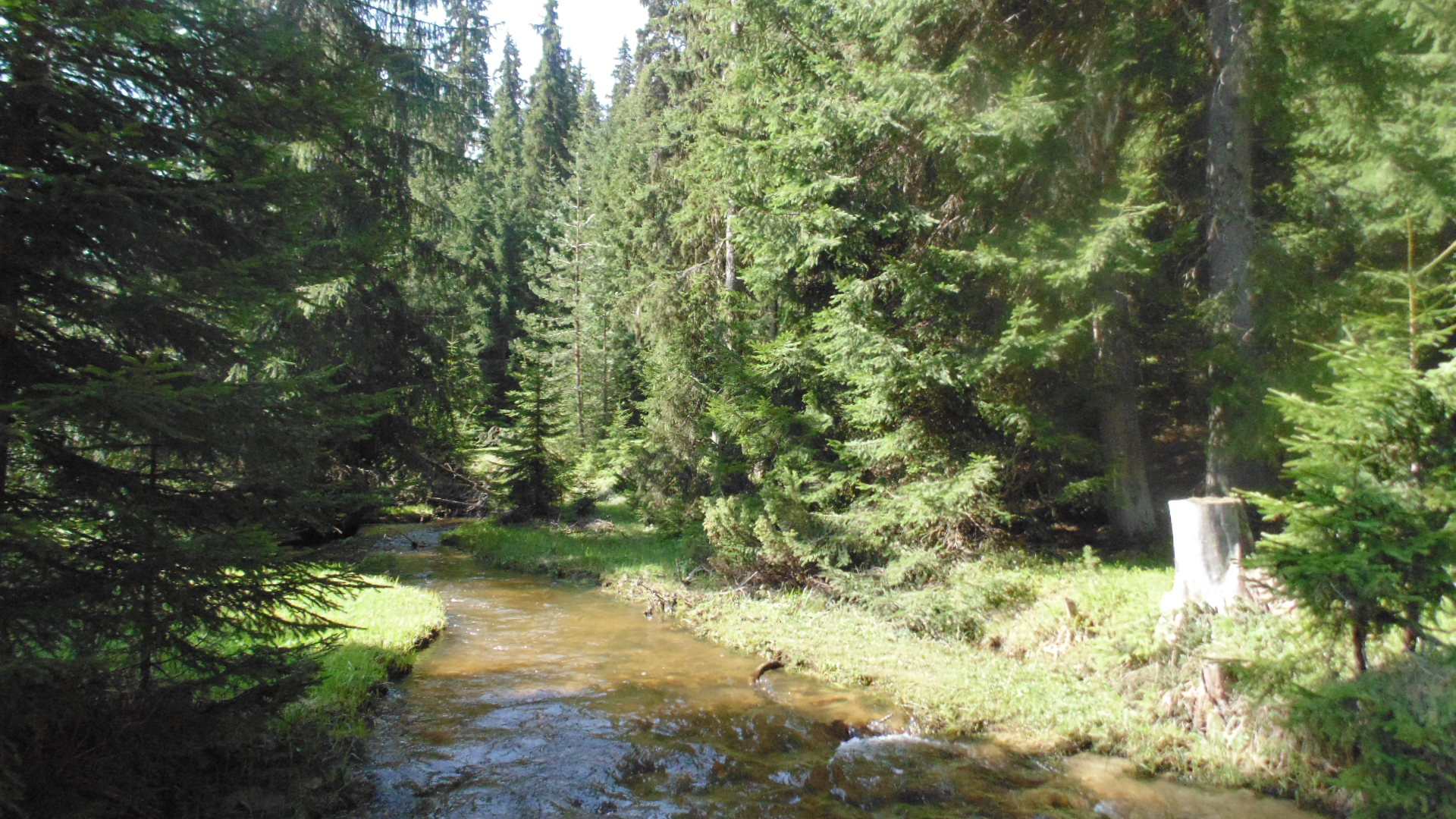

Location
- Country: Bulgaria

Physical characteristics
- Source
  - location: Malka Syutkya summit, Rhodope Mountains
  - coordinates: 42°51′10.08″N 24°1′4.08″E
  - elevation: 1,990 m (6,530 ft)
- Mouth
  - location: Maritsa
  - coordinates: 42°13′15.96″N 24°11′48.84″E
  - elevation: 221 m (725 ft)
- Length: 83 km (52 mi)
- Basin size: 900 km^{2} (350 sq mi)

Basin features
- Progression: Maritsa→ Aegean Sea

The Chepinska reka (Bulgarian: Чепинска река), or Chepino river, is a 83 km-long river in southern Bulgaria, a right tributary of the river Maritsa.

== Geography ==
The river takes its source as Ribna reka (Fish river) at an altitude of 1,990 m, about 800 m southwest of the summit of Malka Syutkya (2,079 m) in the Batak Mountain of western Rhodope mountain range. In its uppermost course, it flows in western-southwestern direction. Following the Karatepe locality, the river turns north and flows through a deep forested valley called Chepinska Bistritsa. At the town of Velingrad it enters the Chepino Valley, where the river is joined by its largest tributary, the Matnitsa. It winds around the summit of Lakatina Chuka (1,059 m) and continues in a southeastern direction. At the village of Draginovo it enters the scenic Chepino Gorge between the Rhodope ridges of Alabak to the northwest and Karkaria to the southeast. Near the village of Varvara, Chepinska reka enters the Upper Thracian Plain, turns northeast and flows into the Maritsa at an altitude of 221 m about 1.4 km north of the village of Kovachevo.

Its drainage basin covers a territory of 900 km^{2} or 1.7% of Maritsa's total and borders the drainage basins of the Stara reka and several small tributaries of the Maritsa to the east, the Vacha to the southeast, the Mesta to the west-southwest and the Yadenitsa to the northwest.

The Chepelarska reka has rain-snow feed with high water in April–May and low water in September. The average annual discharge at Marko Nikolov railway station is 7.93 m^{3}/s.

== Settlements and economy ==
The river flows entirely in Pazardzhik Province. There are four settlements along its course: the town of Velingrad and the village of Draginovo in Velingrad Municipality, and the villages of Vetren Dol and Varvara in Septemvri Municipality. There two main roads along its valley, a 12 km stretch of the second class II-84 road Zvanichevo–Velingrad–Razlog follows the river between Vetren Dol and Dolene railway station, and a 28.4 km stretch of the third class III-843 road Velingrad–Sarnitsa–Dospat follows it between Velingrad and Karatepe. The Septemvri–Dobrinishte narrow-gauge line follows the valley of Chepinska reka in two separate sections — from Varvara to Dolene railway station and from Velingrad to the mouth of the river Ablanitsa. Part of its waters are diverted via underground tunnel to the Batak Reservoir for electricity generation at the Batak Hydropower Cascade (254 MW). On its main tributary, the Matnitsa, is situated the important Batak Reservoir.

== Gallery ==
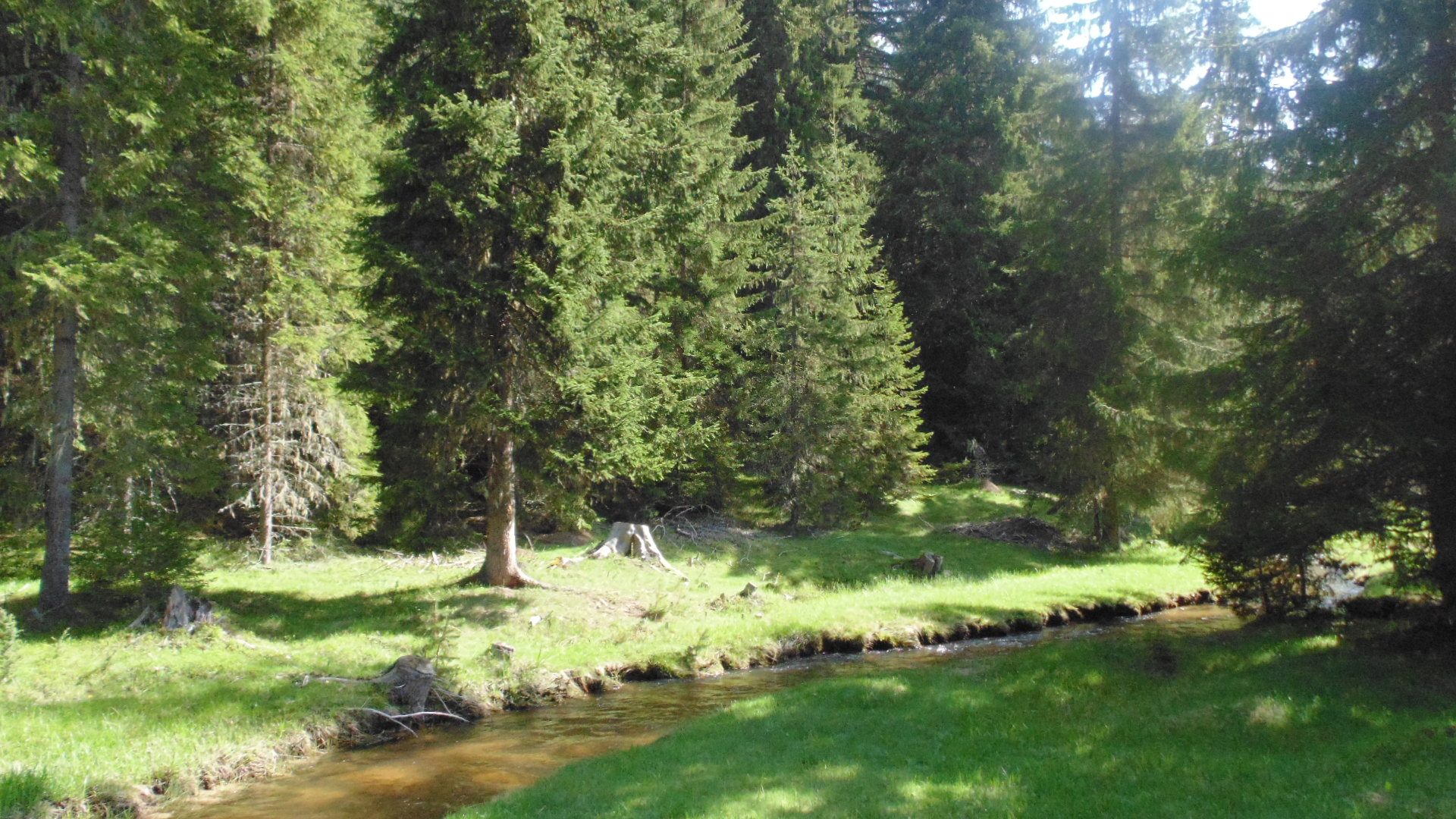
Upper course

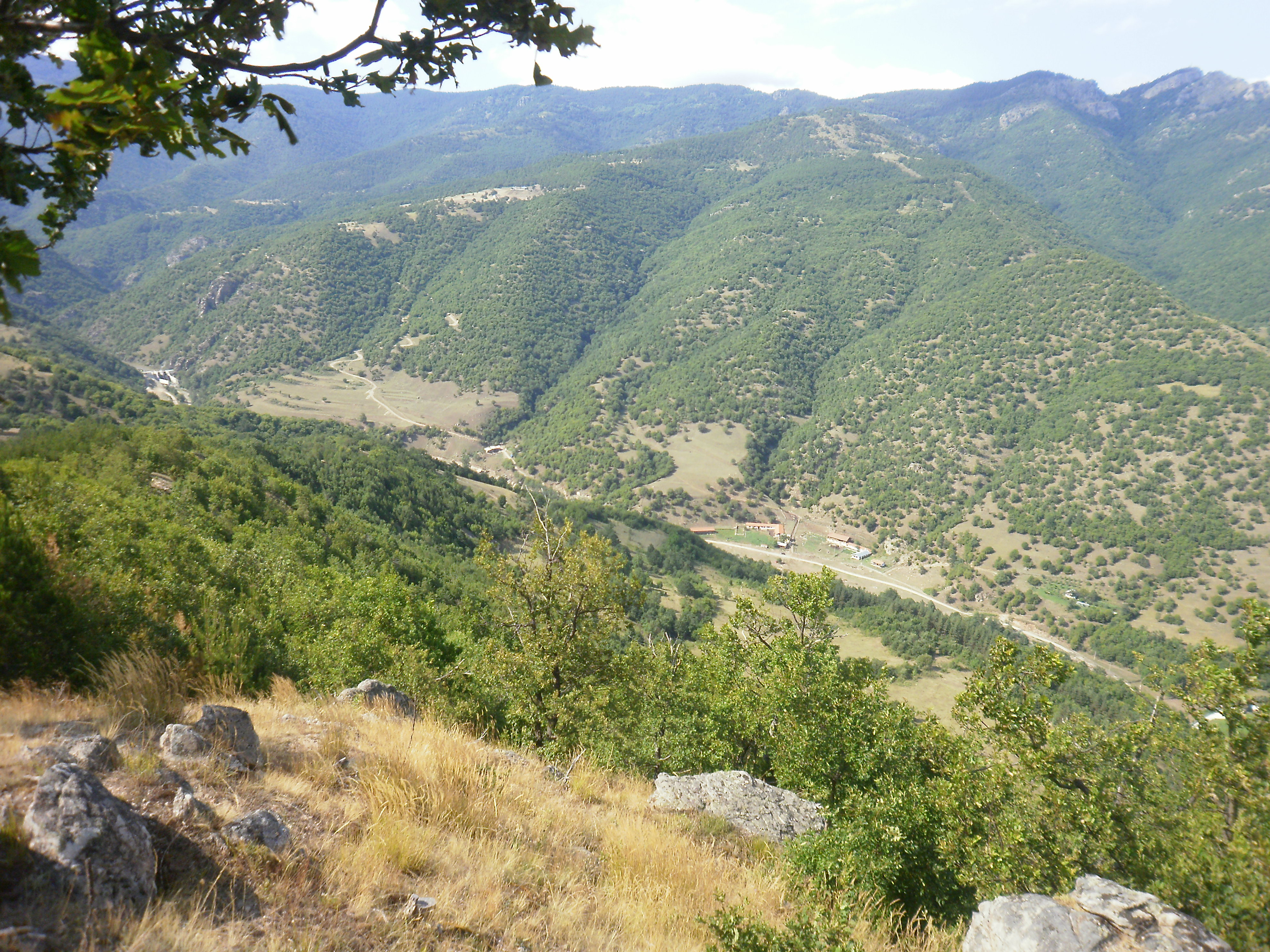
Chepino Gorge

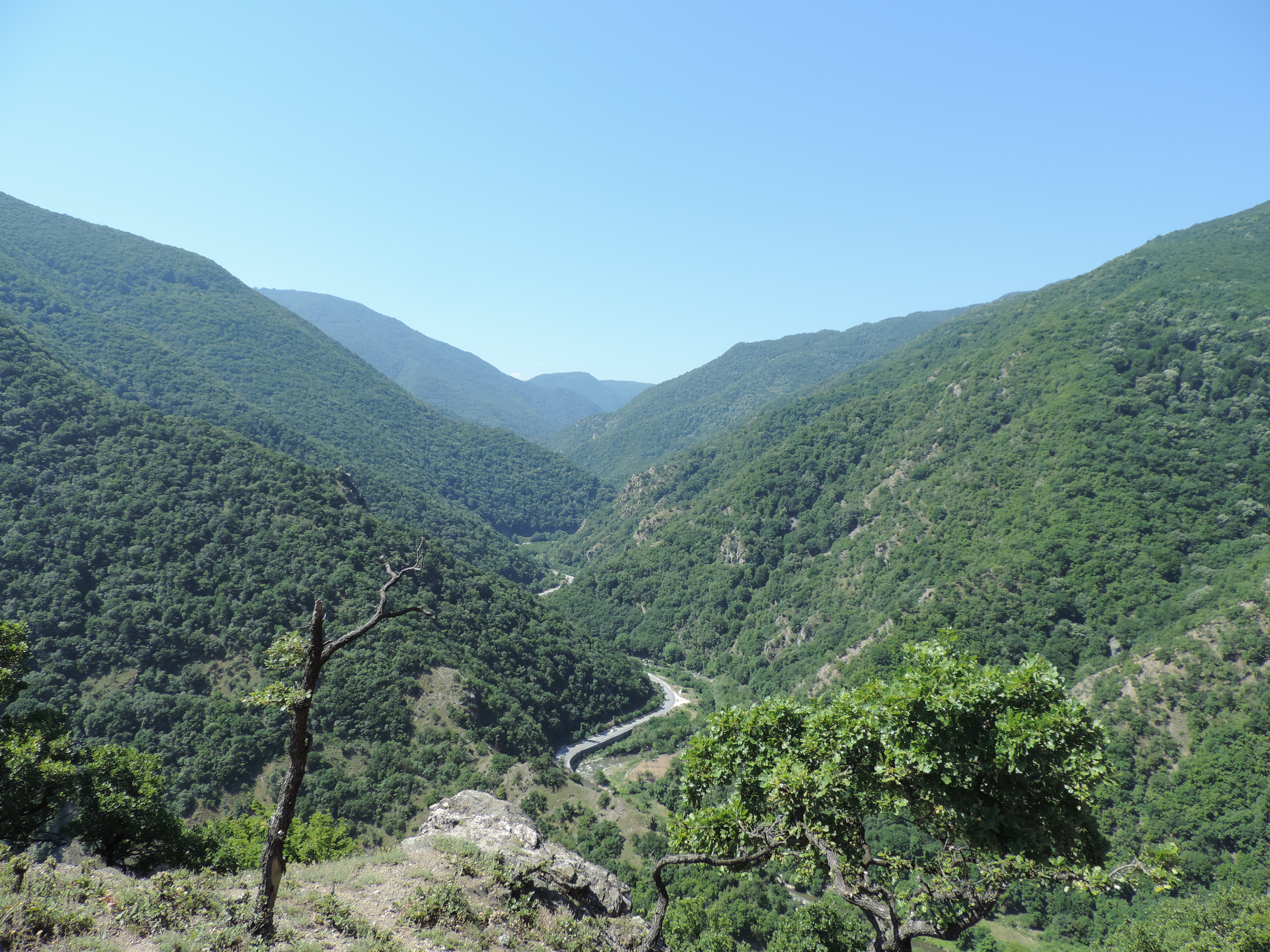
Chepino Gorge

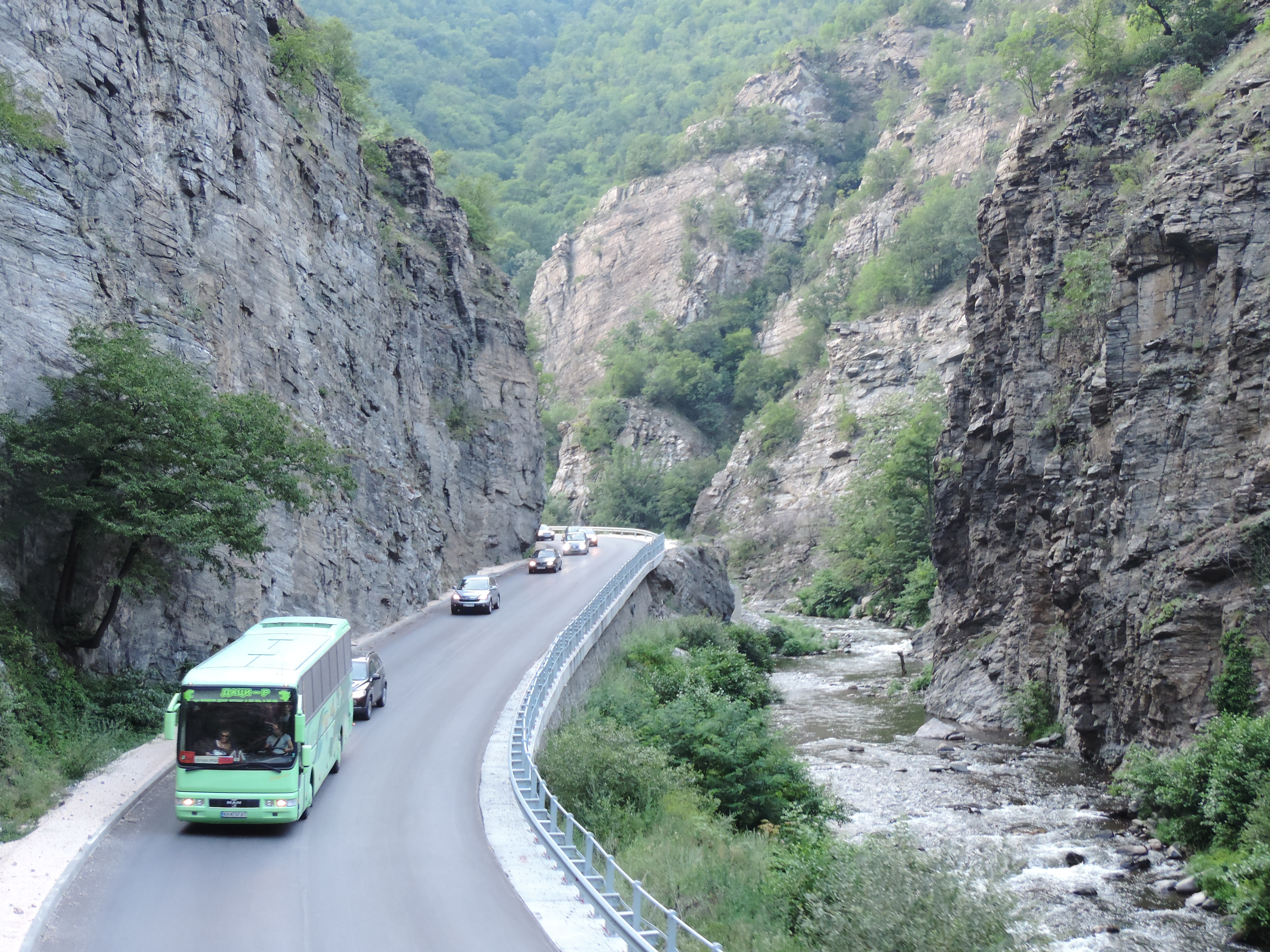
II-84 road along the gorge
