= Batak Reservoir =

Reservoir in Pazardzhik Province, Bulgaria

Batak Dam
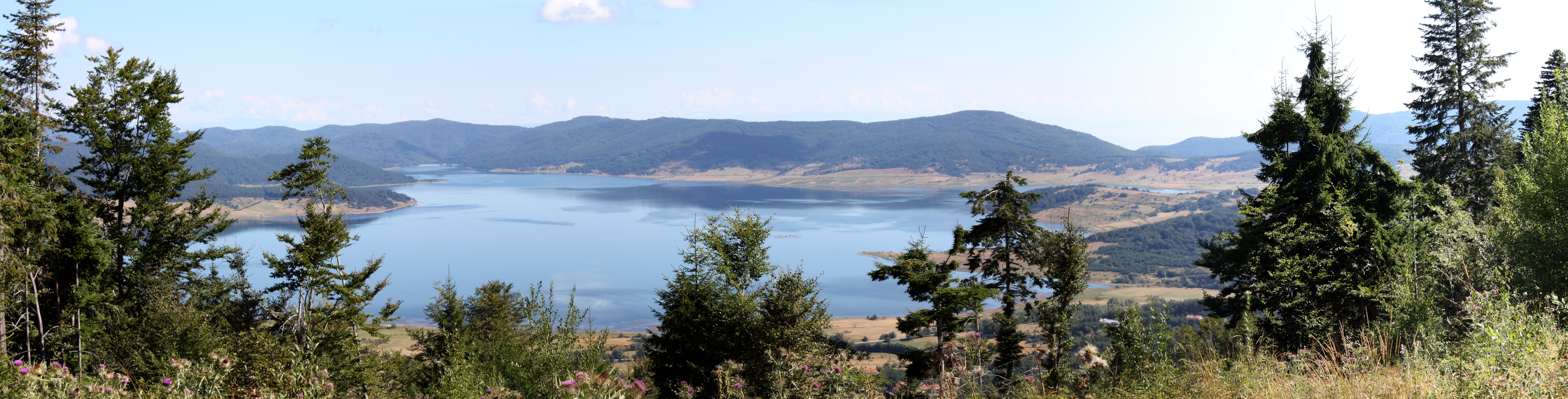

- Location of Batak Reservoir in Bulgaria
- Interactive map of Batak Dam
- Official name: Язовир Батак (Bulgarian)
- Location: Rhodope Mountains west of Batak
- Coordinates: 41°58′16″N 24°11′27″E
- Construction began: 1954
- Opening date: 1959

Dam and spillways
- Type of dam: earthen gravity dam
- Height: 35 m (115 ft)
- Length: 273 m (896 ft)

Reservoir
- Creates: Batak Reservoir
- Total capacity: 310,000,000 m^{3} (250,000 acre⋅ft)
- Catchment area: 463 km^{2} (179 mi^{2})
- Surface area: 21.4 km^{2} (5,300 acres)

Batak Reservoir (Bulgarian: язовир Батак) is located in the Rhodope Mountains of southern Bulgaria and is among the largest in the country. It was constructed to provide electricity generation and irrigation as a major part of the Batak Hydropower Cascade. Rich in fish and situated in a scenic mountain region, the reservoir attracts many tourists and anglers. The resort of Tsigov Chark has been constructed on its southwestern shores.

== Geography ==
Batak Reservoir lies at an altitude of 1,108 m some 4 km west of the town of Batak and is named after the settlement. It is the source of the river Matnitsa, a right tributary of the Chepinska reka of the Maritsa river basin. Administratively, it is in Batak Municipality of Pazardzhik Province. The main access is via the second class II-37 road from the east, as well as the third class III-376 road, which branches off the II-37 just west of Batak and continues west along the reservoir's southern shores to Tsigov Chark and then to the town of Rakitovo and eventually Velingrad some 24 km further west.

The resort of Tsigov Chark offers year-round activities, including a ski track, hiking trails, fishing, various water sports, such as water wheel riding, boating, jet skiing, etc. In the northern part of the lake near the dam is the much smaller and tranquil resting area of Danoto, and about one kilometer northeast of the dam is the small resort of St Contantine, already in Peshtera Municipality.

== Dam ==
Batak Reservoir was constructed in 1954–1959 and has two dams. The main one, located in the northernmost part of the artificial lake, is an earthen structure with a height of 35 m and a length of 273 m. There is a trench spillway with a capacity of 14 m^{3}/s on the left bank and a main outlet in a tunnel with a capacity of 90 m^{3}/s on the right bank. A counter dam has been erected in the western part of the reservoir with a height of 9.5 m and a length of 363 m. Batak Reservoir has a surface area of 24 km^{2} and a volume of 310 million m^{3}; it is 17 km at its longest and 4 km at its widest.

The reservoir is the main facility of the second level of the Batak Hydropower Cascade (254 MW) and is the most important leveling structure in the whole cascade. It receives the water from the first level of the cascade, after being discharged from the underground Batak Hydro Power Plant further upstream, as well as water from the tributaries of the Chepinska reka south of Velingrad, the tributaries of the Stara reka south of Batak, Peshtera and Bratsigovo, as well as some rivers from the Vacha basin further east. The total length of the derivation channels is 128 km, of which 51 km are tunnels. The water of the reservoir flows through a 3 km long pressure culvert to the underground Peshtera Hydro Power Plant downstream and then are utilized for the irrigation of about 450–500 km^{2} of arable land in the Upper Thracian Plain.

== Gallery ==
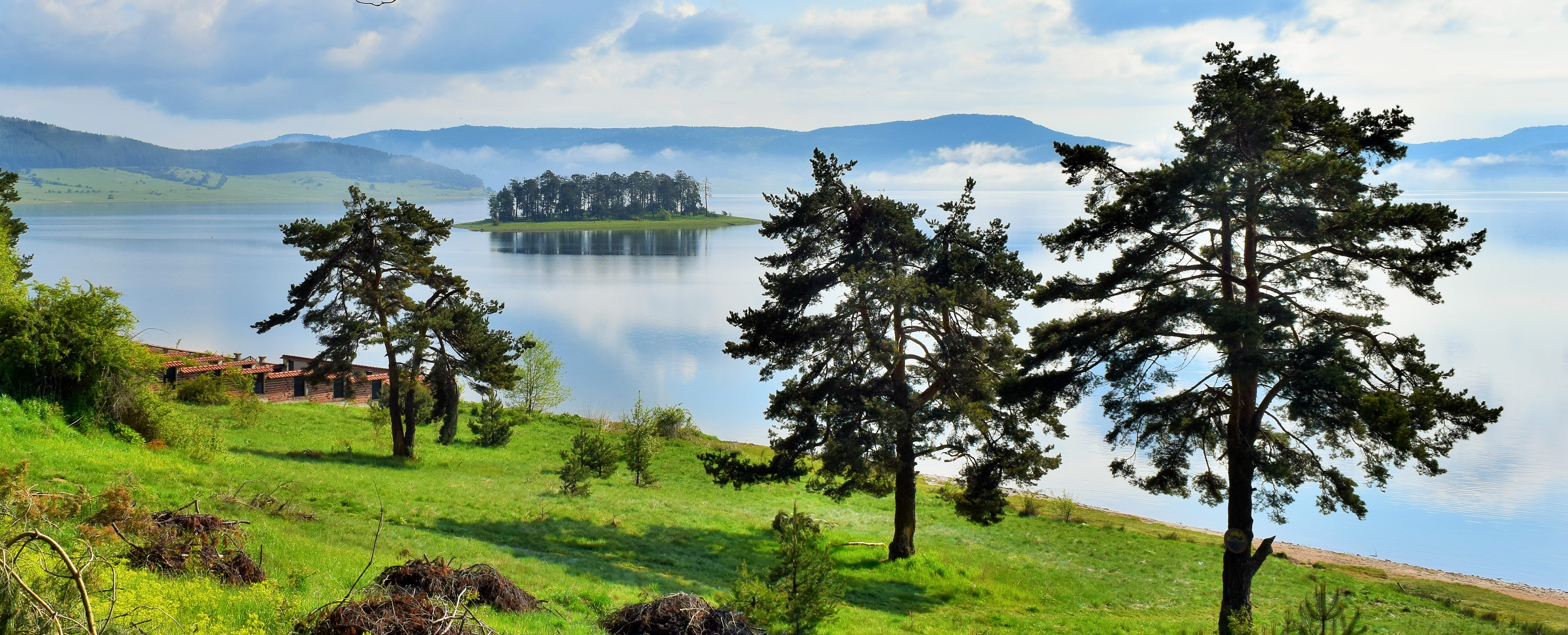

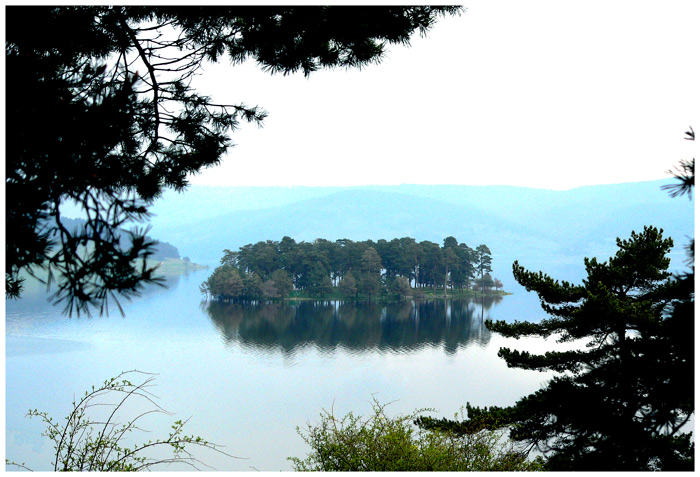

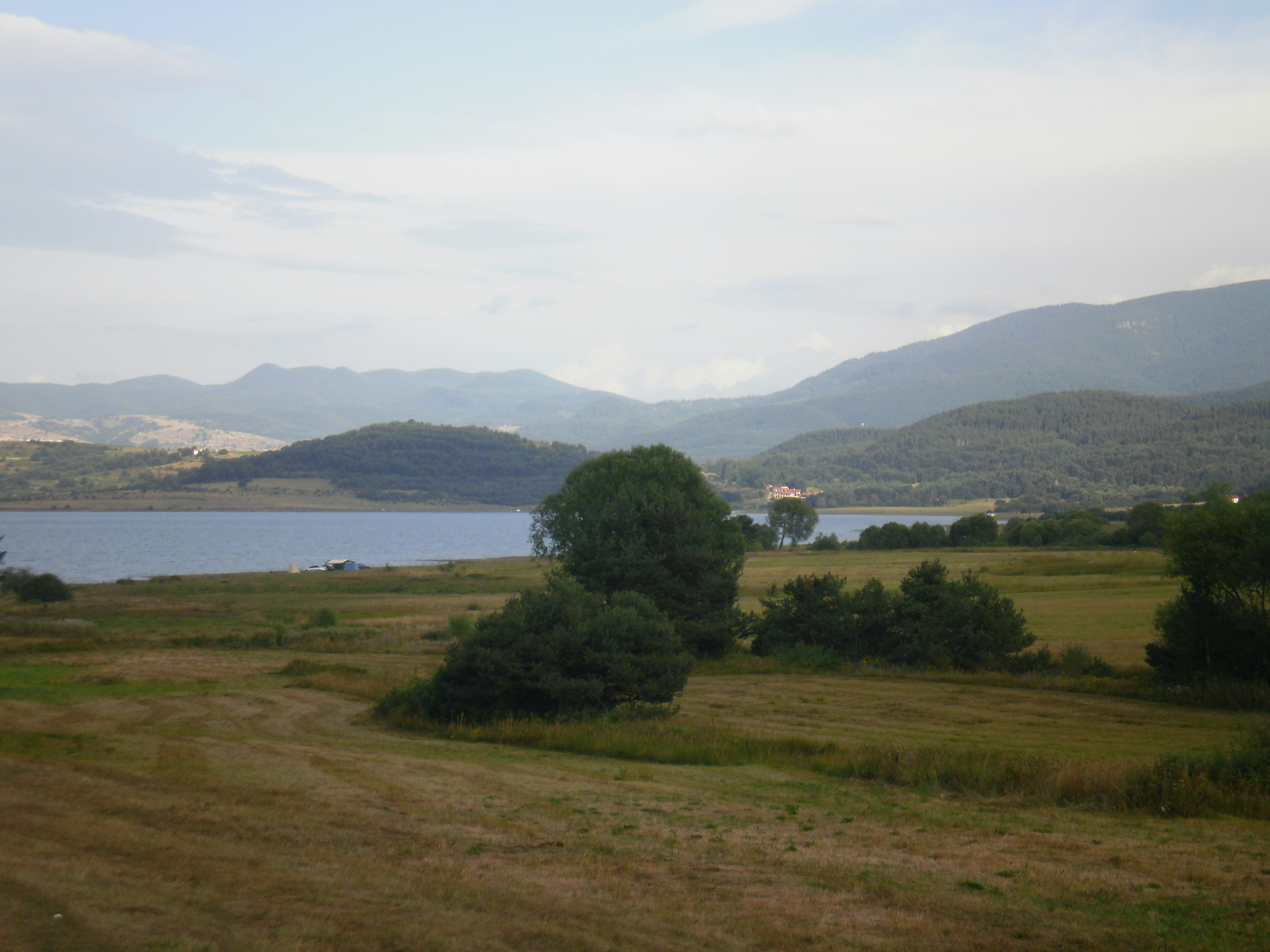

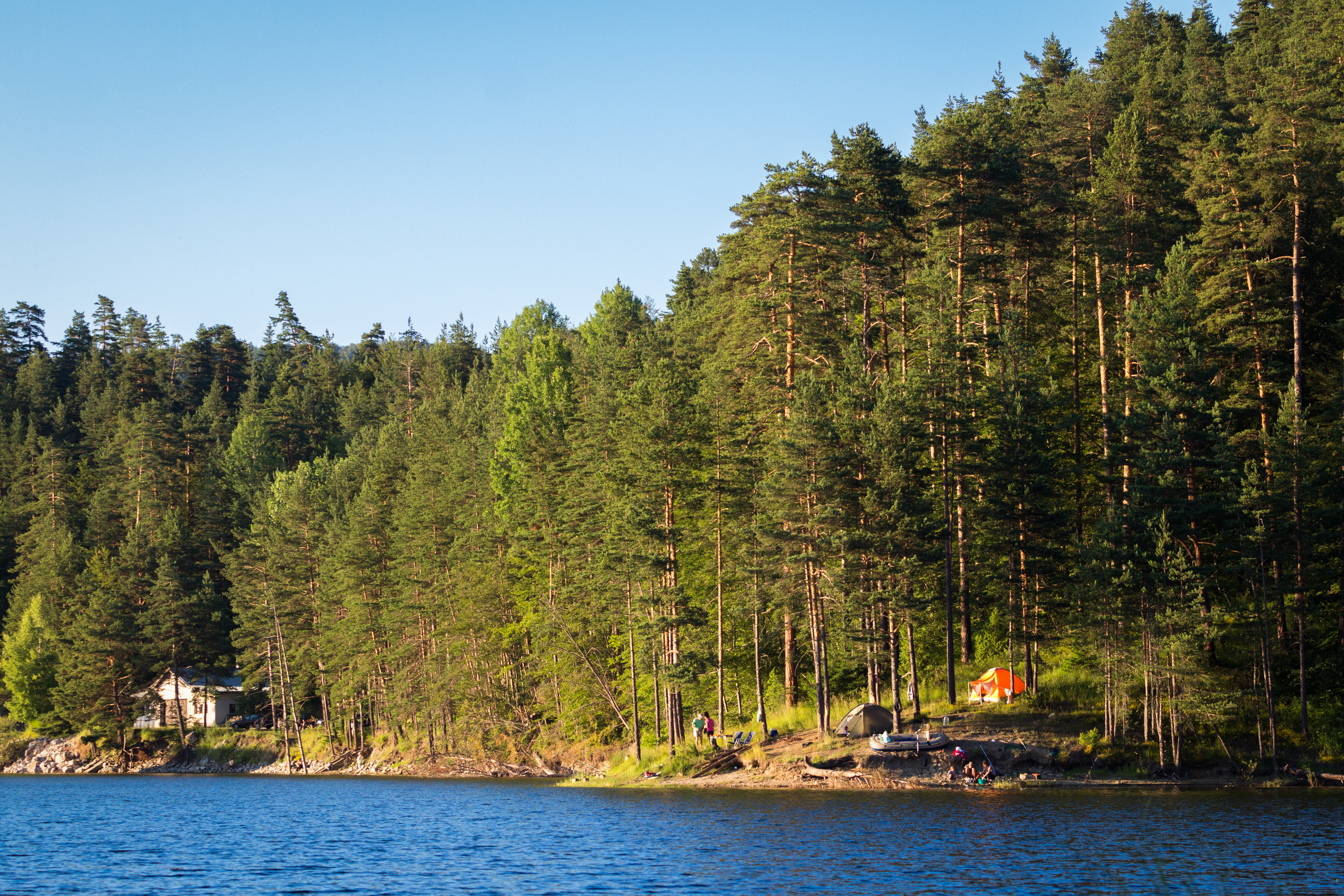
