= Dorkovo =

Dorkovo Дорково Dorcova
- Village
- Location of Dorkovo
- Coordinates: 42°03′N 24°08′E
- Country: Bulgaria
- Provinces (Oblast): Pazardzhik Province

Government
  - Mayor: Nikolay Kovachev (BSP)

Area
  - Total: 79.459 km^{2} (30.679 sq mi)
- Elevation: 822 m (2,697 ft)

Population (2007-01-01)
  - Total: 2,955
  - Density: 37.19/km^{2} (96.32/sq mi)
- Time zone: UTC+2 (EET)
  - Summer (DST): UTC+3 (EEST)
- Postal Code: 4641

Dorkovo (Bulgarian: Дорково; Aromanian: Dorcova) is a village in the Rakitovo municipality, Pazardzhik Province, western Bulgaria. The population of the village is 2,955. Aromanians live in the village.

== Geography ==
Dorkovo is situated in the western Rhodope Mountains on the two banks of the river Matnitsa in the north-eastern parts of the Chepino Valley. It is located at the southern foothills of the Karkariya ridge which is part of the Batak Mountain.

The closest settlement is the small town of Kostandovo at only 3 km to the south. Further in southern direction is situated the municipal centre Rakitovo, while Velingrad the largest town in the area is at 14 km to the south-west.

== Demographics ==
Members of the small Aromanian minority of Bulgaria live in Dorkovo, with this village being one of the few places in the country with an Aromanian community.

== Public institutions ==
=== Chitalishte ===
The chitalishte of the village is called St St Cyril and Methodius and was established in 1919 and initially used the edifice of a local cafe. The chitalishte was officially inaugurated in 1927 and moved to its own building in 1928. It was demolished on 3 August 1958 and a new two-storey edifice was constructed by December 1962. It has a cinema saloon with 300 seats, dressing rooms, rehearsal saloon and a modernised library. There are three amateur groups to the chitalishte.

=== Ovcharska Pesen Ensemble ===
The Ovcharska Pesen (Shepherd's Song) folklore ensemble to the chitalishte was founded in 1971. It consist of an orchestra, dancing group, male and female singing groups. The number of people varies between 45 and 120. The ensemble uses traditional Bulgarian musical instruments from the Rhodopi region - kaval, gaida, davul, goblet drum and tambura.

== Landmarks ==
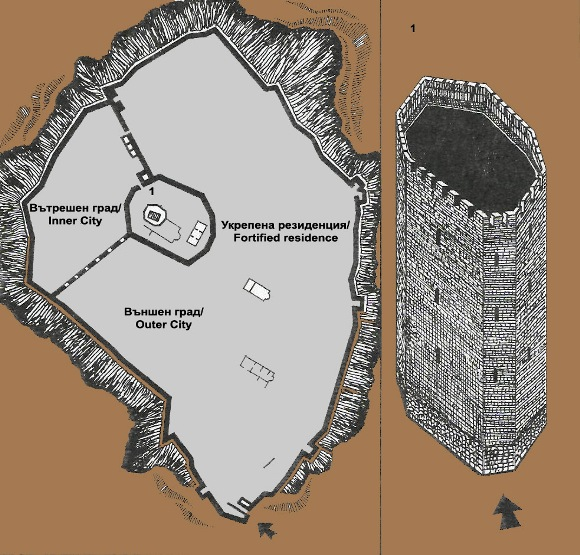
Plan of the Tsepina fortress.

=== Tsepina fortress ===
The medieval fortress of Tsepina is situated to the north-west of the village and can be accessed by a 6-km asphalt road. It was constructed on the cone-like peak of the same name at an altitude of 1,136 m. The fortress was seized by the Byzantine Empire in the 11th century but was liberated by the Bulgarian Empire during the rule of Kaloyan who appointed Despot Alexius Slav as a governor of the Rhodopes but after Kaloyan's death in 1207 Slav became de facto an independent local ruler.

Between 1246 and 1254 Tsepina was occupied by the Nicaeans but was recovered by Emperor Michael II Asen. In 1373 the fortress was captured by the Ottoman Turks in the course of the Bulgarian-Ottoman Wars and destroyed.

=== Paleontological site ===
There is a paleontological site in the vicinities of Dorkovo. In the locality of Ilin Kladenets have been discovered fossils from mastodons dating to the Early Pliocene, more than 4 million years ago, making them the oldest fossils of that species in Europe.

The site was discovered in the 1970s during search for mineral resources. The first scientific expedition was organised in 1984 followed by an international one in 1985 in cooperation with Collège de France which discovered parts of mastodon skeletons.

The site was declared a natural landmark on 31 January 1990.

Some fossil bird bones about 5–4.5 million years old have also been found here. Balcanas pliocaenica, a waterfowl described from fragmentary remains, may be a distinct and extinct lineage, the first record of the still-living common shelduck (Tadorna tadorna), or from a more ancestral shelduck.
