= Tsigov Chark =

Ski resort in Bulgaria

Coordinates: 41°57′18″N 24°9′2″E

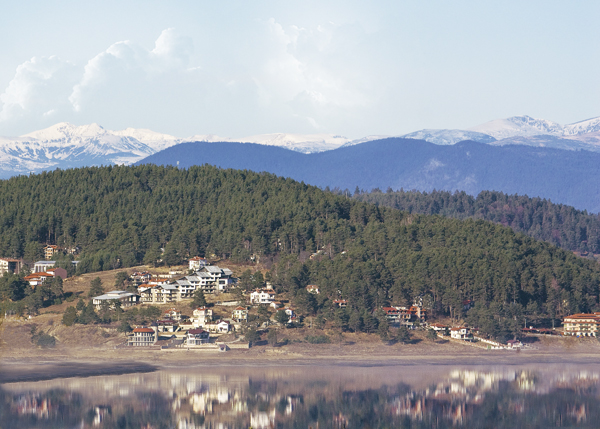
A view of Tsigov Chark

Tsigov Chark (Bulgarian: Цигов чарк) is a ski resort in the western Rhodope Mountains of Bulgaria. It is located at 900–1000 metres above sea level, and is located 8 kilometres from the town of Batak and 24 kilometres east of Velingrad. The resort is situated near Batak Reservoir.
