= Tsepina =

Ruined castle and town in Pazardzhik Province, Bulgaria

Coordinates: 42.085°N 24.124°E

Tsepina Цепина
- Pazardzhik Province, Bulgaria
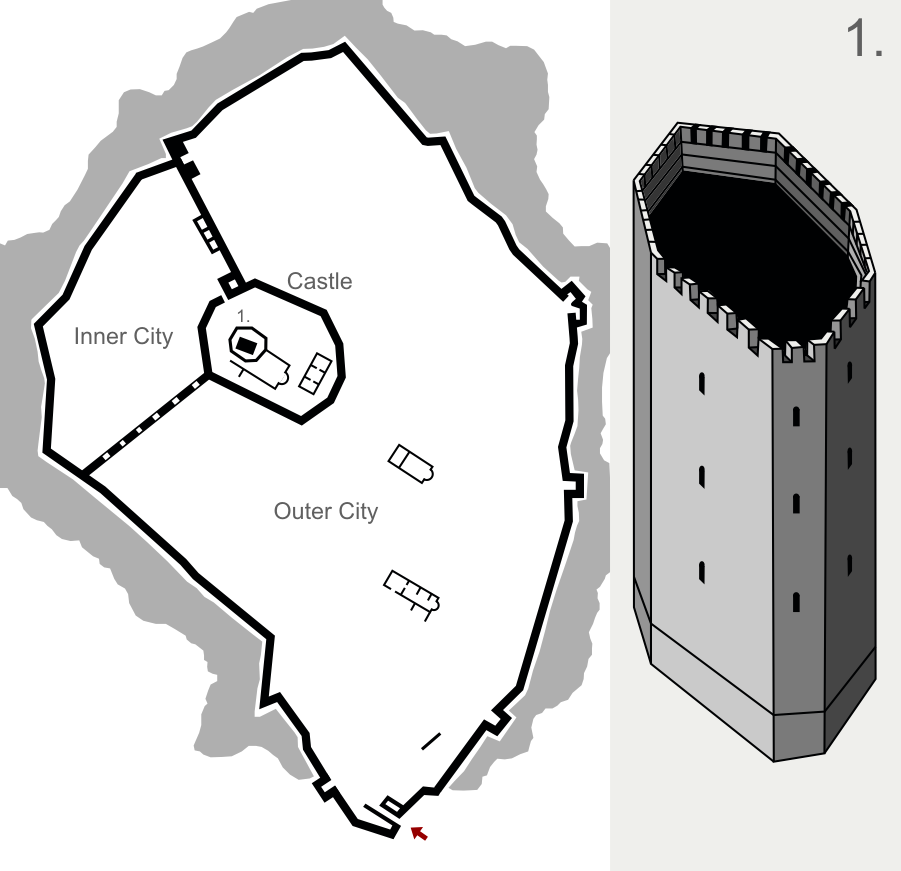
- Tsepina Fortress - plan.

Site information
- Condition: In ruins

Site history
- Events: Byzantine–Bulgarian Wars; Bulgarian-Ottoman Wars

Tsepina (Bulgarian: Цепина) or Tzepaina (Greek: Τζέπαινα) was a castle and town in the western Rhodope mountains, southern Bulgaria, now in ruins. It is 6 kilometres (4 mi) from the Dorkovo village in the north-eastern part of the Chepino Valley. Tsepina is 317 metres (1,040 ft) above sea level.

The town was built on a steep height at 1,136 metres (3,727 ft) above sea level. Its outer walls closed an area of 25 decares and was dominated by a citadel at the top of the cliff. The foundations of three churches have been excavated as well as four large water storage tanks up to 10 metres (33 ft) deep.

== History ==
The site was already settled in prehistoric times. Remnants of pottery from the 4th–6th century and houses and a large three-aisled church in the area of the citadel point to a settlement during early Byzantine times.

The Bulgarians took the castle in the 9th century but with the end of the First Bulgarian Empire in the beginning of the 11th century the Byzantines conquered it.

The other buildings and pottery found on the site date to the 12th–14th centuries, when the fortress was repeatedly fought over between the Byzantines and Bulgarians due to its strategic location. During the reign of the Bulgarian emperor Kaloyan (1197–1207), the fortress was the residence of his nephew, the despot Alexius Slav. In 1246 it fell, along with the other fortresses in the region, to the Empire of Nicaea, but Bulgarian emperor Michael II Asen (1246–1256) recovered it soon after the death of the Nicaean emperor John III Vatatzes in 1254. The Nicaeans launched several unsuccessful attempts to recapture the fortress, but in 1256 Michael II Asen ceded it by treaty to Vatatzes' son and successor, Theodore II Laskaris.

The fortress remained in Byzantine hands thereafter, forming, along with nearby Stenimachos, its own province, until it was ceded in 1343 or 1344 to the Bulgarians during the Byzantine civil war of 1341–1347, when the regency council tried to obtain Bulgarian support against the usurper John VI Kantakouzenos. Around 1373 it was seized by the Turks under the command of Daud Pasha, after a bloody nine-month siege. The fortress fell only after the Ottomans cut off the water-conduit. Soon after that it was abandoned by its inhabitants and fell into ruin, although one of the churches continued to be used until the 17th century, possibly as part of a monastery (whence the local names Metoha, 'metochion', or Manastirat, 'monastery', for the settlement).
