= Chepino Valley =

Valley in the Rhodope Mountains in Bulgaria

Coordinates: 42°1′N 24°5′E

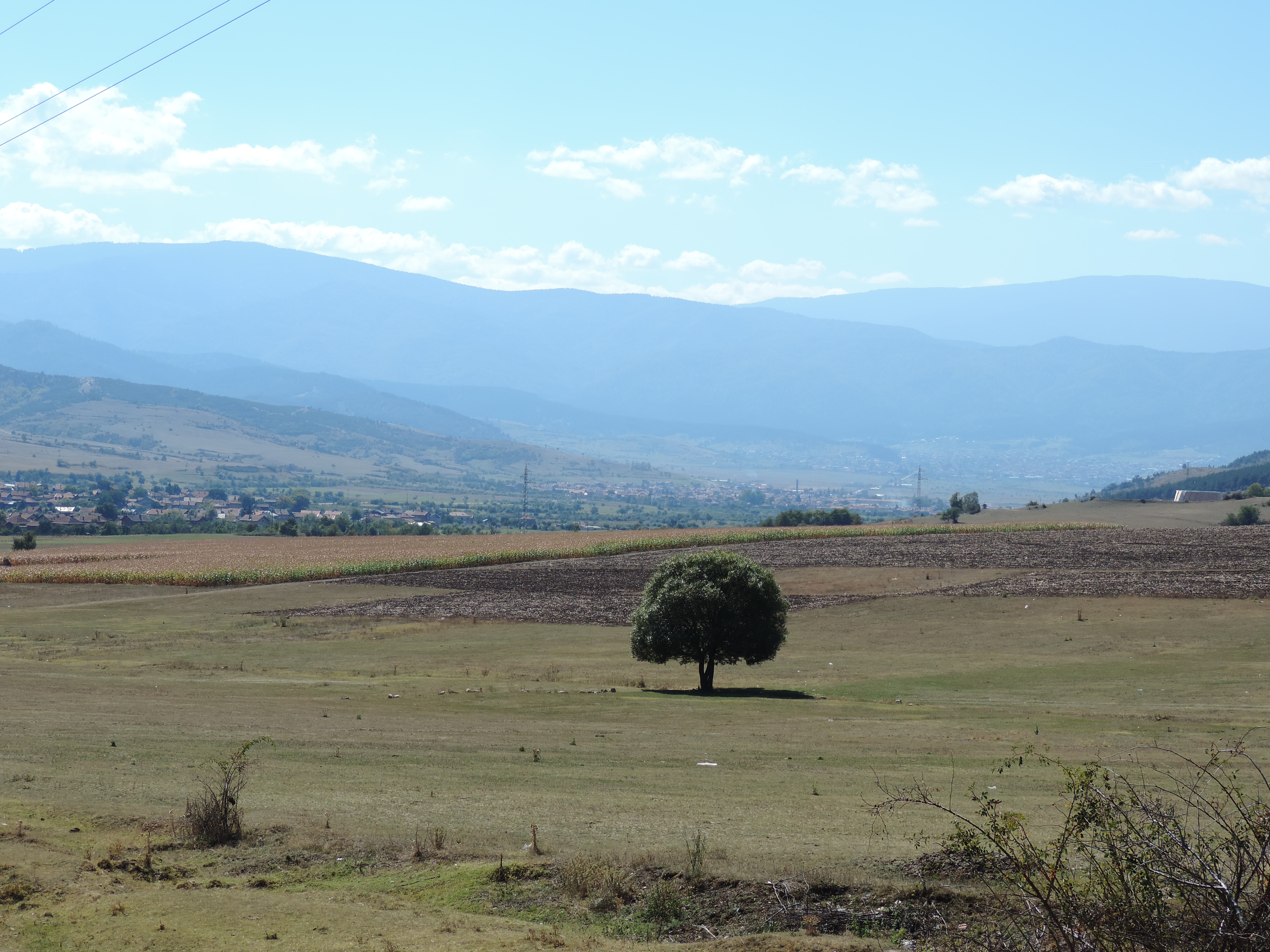
View of the eastern part of the Chepino Valley

The Chepino Valley (Bulgarian: Чепинска котловина, romanized: Chepinska kotlovina), or Chepino (Bulgarian: Чепино), is the largest valley in the Rhodope Mountains in southern Bulgaria. It is situated along the course of the river Chepinska reka near the Batak Mountains in the northwestern part of the Rhodopes. Located at around 750 m above sea level, it is between 4 and 7 km wide and 18 km long. The bottom of the Chepino Valley is comparatively flat, although hills can also be found. The valley's fault structure is the reason for the frequent earthquakes in the area, as well as for the high number of mineral springs, numbering more than 80 and making the Chepino Valley an important tourist destination in the Rhodopes.

Due to its geographic location, the valley has a considerably milder climate than that in other parts of Bulgaria. The slopes that surround the valley are covered with venerable coniferous forests, mainly of spruce. The second highest peak of the Rhodopes, Golyama Syutkya, is located nearby. An important city in the valley is Velingrad.

The valley takes its name from the medieval Bulgarian fortress of Tsepina, the capital of the domain of Despot Alexius Slav in the 13th century, which was excavated near the village of Dorkovo.

In the early 17th century, the Eastern Orthodox Bulgarian inhabitants of the valley were believed to have been Islamized by the Ottoman authorities of the time, and thus today the population is mixed, with both Orthodox Bulgarians and Pomaks (Muslim Bulgarians) inhabiting the valley.
