= Peshtera Municipality =

- Municipality
- Coat of arms

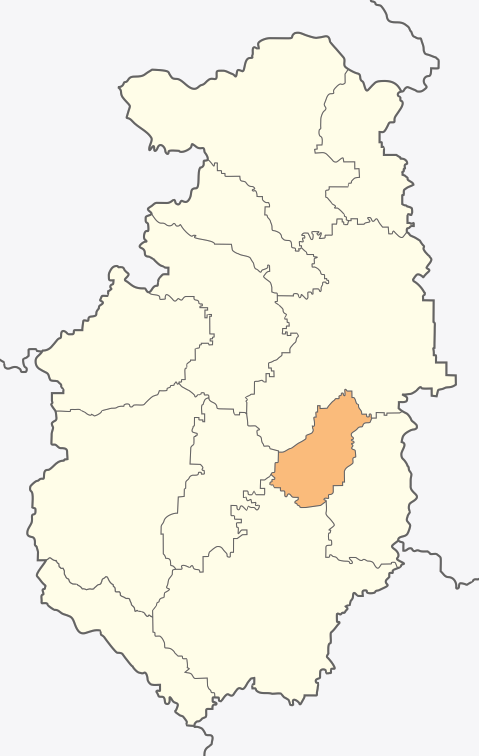
- Location of Peshtera Municipality in Pazardzhik Province

- Location of Peshtera Municipality in Bulgaria
- Coordinates: 42°01′59″N 24°18′00″E
- Country: Bulgaria
- Province: Pazardzhik Province
- Capital: Peshtera

Area
  - Total: 150.51 km^{2} (58.11 sq mi)
- Elevation: 440 m (1,440 ft)

Population (2011)
  - Total: 18,899
  - Density: 125.57/km^{2} (325.22/sq mi)

Peshtera Municipality (Bulgarian: Община Пещера) is a municipality in the Pazardzhik Province of Bulgaria.

== Demographics ==
Ethnic composition of Peshtera Municipality
1. Bulgarians (65.3%)
2. Turks (14.8%)
3. Gypsies/Romani (3.96%)
4. No identification (14.8%)
5. Other (1.08%)

At the 2011 census, the population of Peshtera was 18,899. Most of the inhabitants (65.29%) were Bulgarians, and there were significant minorities of Gypsies/Romani (3.96%) and Turks (14.79%). 14.85% of the population's ethnicity was unknown.

Historical population
Year	Pop.	±%
1946	12,955	—
1956	18,314	+41.4%
1965	17,940	−2.0%
1975	20,558	+14.6%
1985	21,918	+6.6%
1992	22,233	+1.4%
2001	22,037	−0.9%
2011	18,899	−14.2%
2021	14,742	−22.0%

== Communities ==
=== Towns ===
- Peshtera

=== Villages ===
- Kapitan Dimitrievo
- Radilovo
