= Kostandovo =

Kostandovo Костандово
- Location of Kostandovo
- Coordinates: 42°1′N 24°0′E
- Country: Bulgaria
- Province (Oblast): Pazardzhik

Government
  - Mayor: Valentin Vignev
- Elevation: 913 m (2,995 ft)

Population (July 2010)
  - Total: 4,342
- Time zone: UTC+2 (EET)
  - Summer (DST): UTC+3 (EEST)
- Postal Code: 4644
- Area codes: 03544, +359

Kostandovo (Bulgarian: Костандово [ko'standоvo]) is a small town in the Pazardzhik Province, southern Bulgaria. In 2010, it had 4342 inhabitants. It gained its town status in 2005. It is located in the Rhodope Mountains close to the Batak Dam and the town of Rakitovo.
