= Alexius Slav =

Bulgarian noble

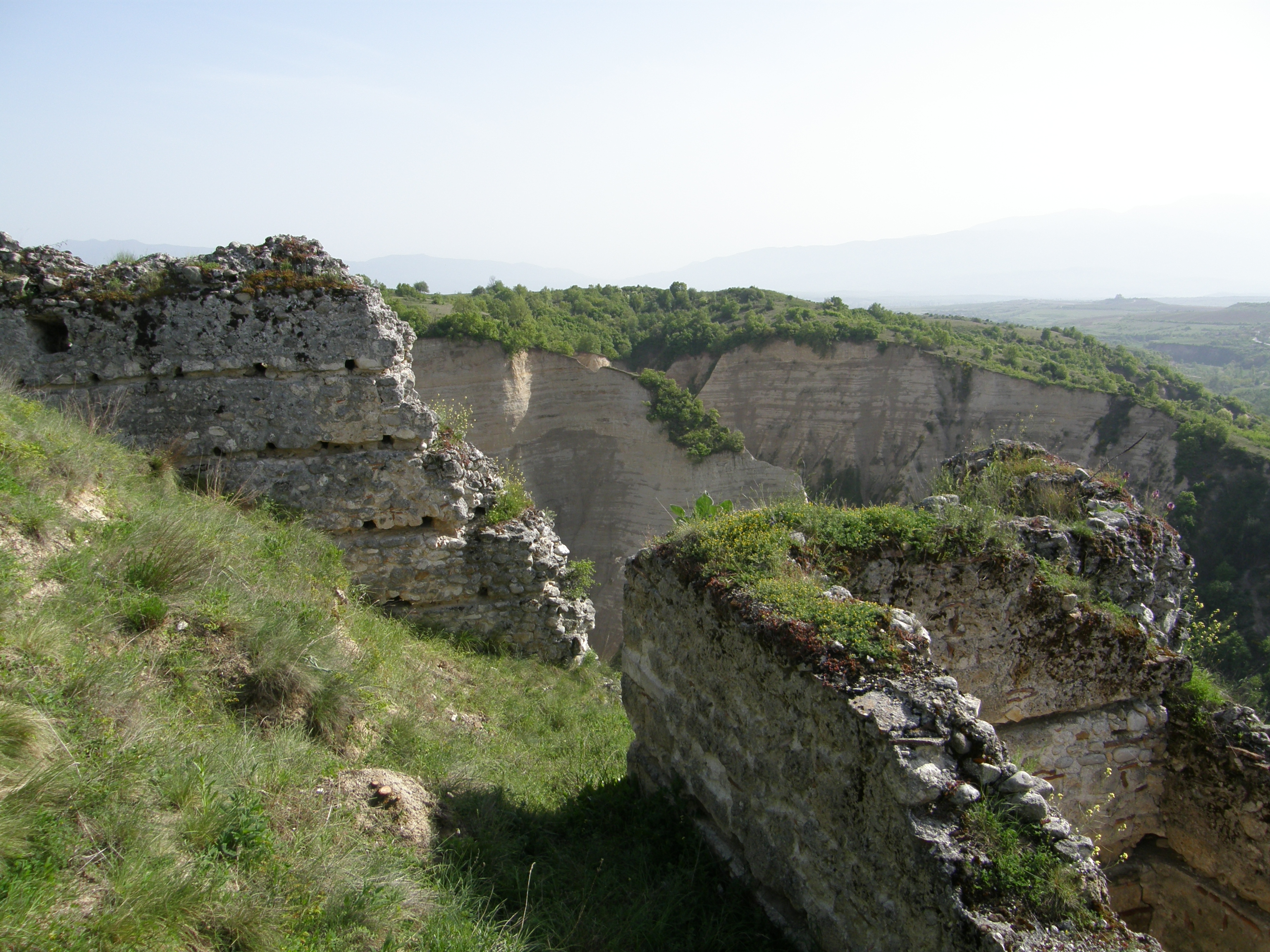
Alexius Slav's fortress near Melnik

Alexius Slav (Bulgarian: Алексий Слав, Greek: Ἀλέξιος Σθλαῦος; fl. 1208–28) was a Bulgarian nobleman (bolyarin), a member of the Asen dynasty, and a nephew of the first three Asen brothers. He was first probably the governor of the Rhodopes domain of the Second Bulgarian Empire, and then an autocrat in these lands.

He was first mentioned as one of the nobles disputing Tsar Boril's ascension to the Bulgarian throne. He married the daughter of Latin Emperor Henry of Flanders in November 1208, leaving the Bulgarian capital of Veliko Tarnovo and establishing himself as an independent ruler over the largest part of the Rhodope Mountains. Alexius Slav became a vassal of Henry after the Bulgarian defeat near Plovdiv. Henry promised to support his aspirations for the Bulgarian throne and awarded Alexius Slav the title of despot.

In 1211, he fought against Boril together with the Despotate of Epirus, extending the territory of his state and capturing the fortress of Melnik, where he moved his capital from Tsepina in 1215, and became an autocrat. In Melnik, Alexius Slav had a royal court of his own; the court consisted of Bulgarians as well as Franks (a sebastos of the Franks was mentioned in one contemporary epigraph). Despot Alexius Slav is also known to have issued a charter donating a feudal possession to the nearby Monastery of the Mother of God Speliotissa in 1220. In this document, Alexius Slav called the monastery despot's and tsar's, hinting at his confidence and power.

His state became once again a part of the Bulgarian Empire after the Battle of Klokotnitsa on 9 March 1230. However, after December 1228, his name was no longer mentioned in the historical sources. Some scholars link him to the stolnik Slav from a later ring inscription unearthed in Tarnovo, but this identification is unreliable according to historian Ivan Bozhilov.

Alexius Slav was married twice: first to an unknown illegitimate daughter of Henry of Flanders and then, after her death, to the daughter of a Petraliphas, brother-in-law to the ruler of Epirus (and after 1225 Emperor of Thessalonica) Theodore Komnenos Doukas (perhaps the sebastokrator John Petraliphas). The sources give no information about any progeny.

== Honours ==
Slav Point on Oscar II Coast in Graham Land, Antarctica is named after Alexius Slav.
