= Velingrad =

Town in Pazardzhik Province, Bulgaria

Velingrad Велинград
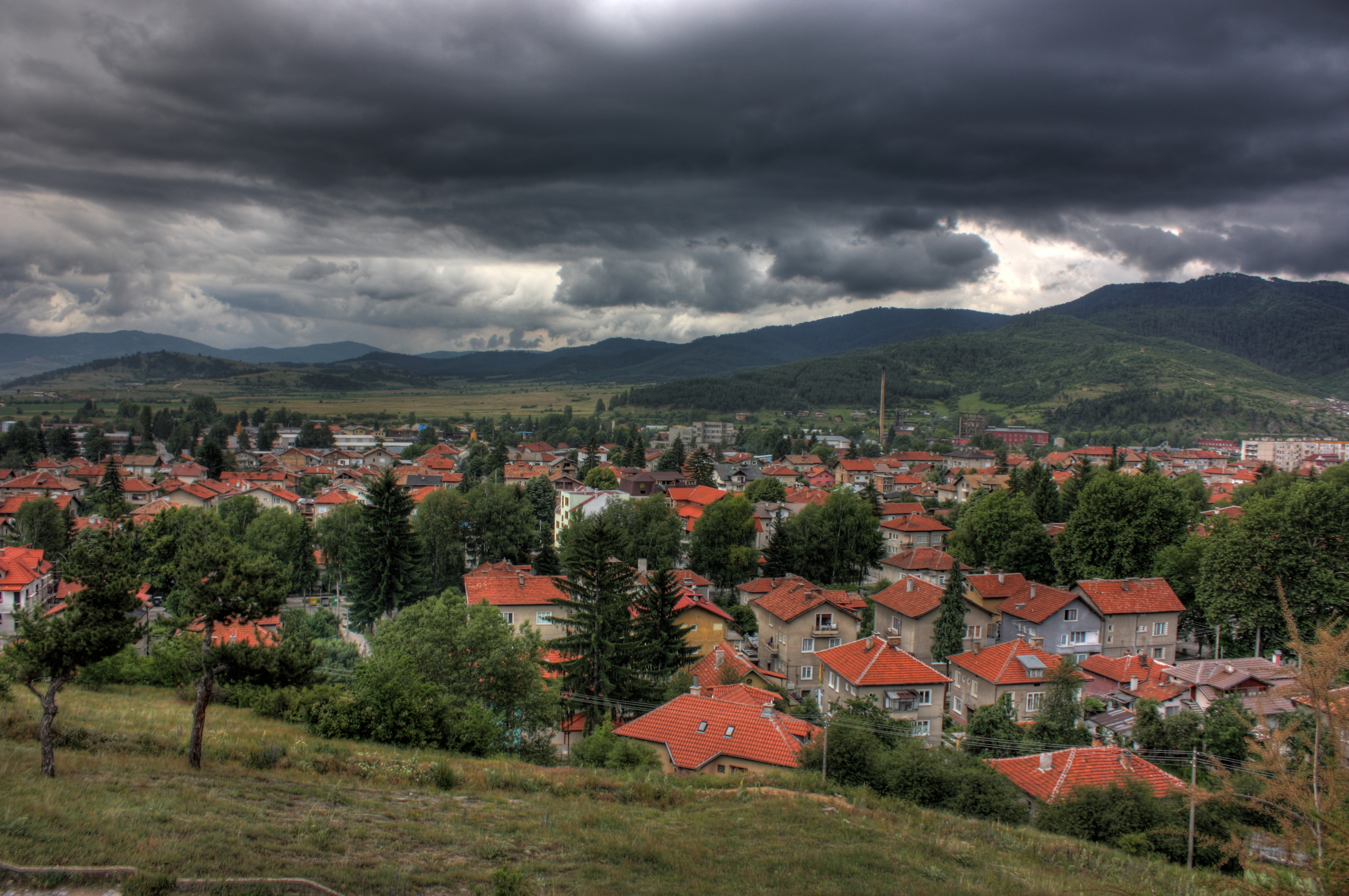
- Velingrad in mid-June 2008

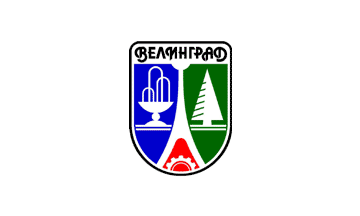
- Flag Coat of arms

- Location of Velingrad
- Coordinates: 42°1′N 24°0′E
- Country: Bulgaria
- Province (Oblast): Pazardzhik

Government
  - Mayor: Kostadin Koev

Area
  - Total: 124.955 km^{2} (48.245 sq mi)
- Elevation: 777 m (2,549 ft)

Population (December 2021)
  - Total: 20,286
  - Density: 162.35/km^{2} (420.48/sq mi)
- Time zone: UTC+2 (EET)
  - Summer (DST): UTC+3 (EEST)
- Postal Code: 4600
- Area code: 359
- Website: Official website

Velingrad (Bulgarian: Велинград [ˈvɛlinɡrat]) is a town in Pazardzhik Province, Southern Bulgaria, located at the western end of Chepino Valley, part of the Rhodope Mountains. It is the administrative center of the homonymous Velingrad Municipality and one of the most popular Bulgarian balneological resorts. The town has a population of 22,602 inhabitants according to the 2011 census of Velingrad.

== History ==
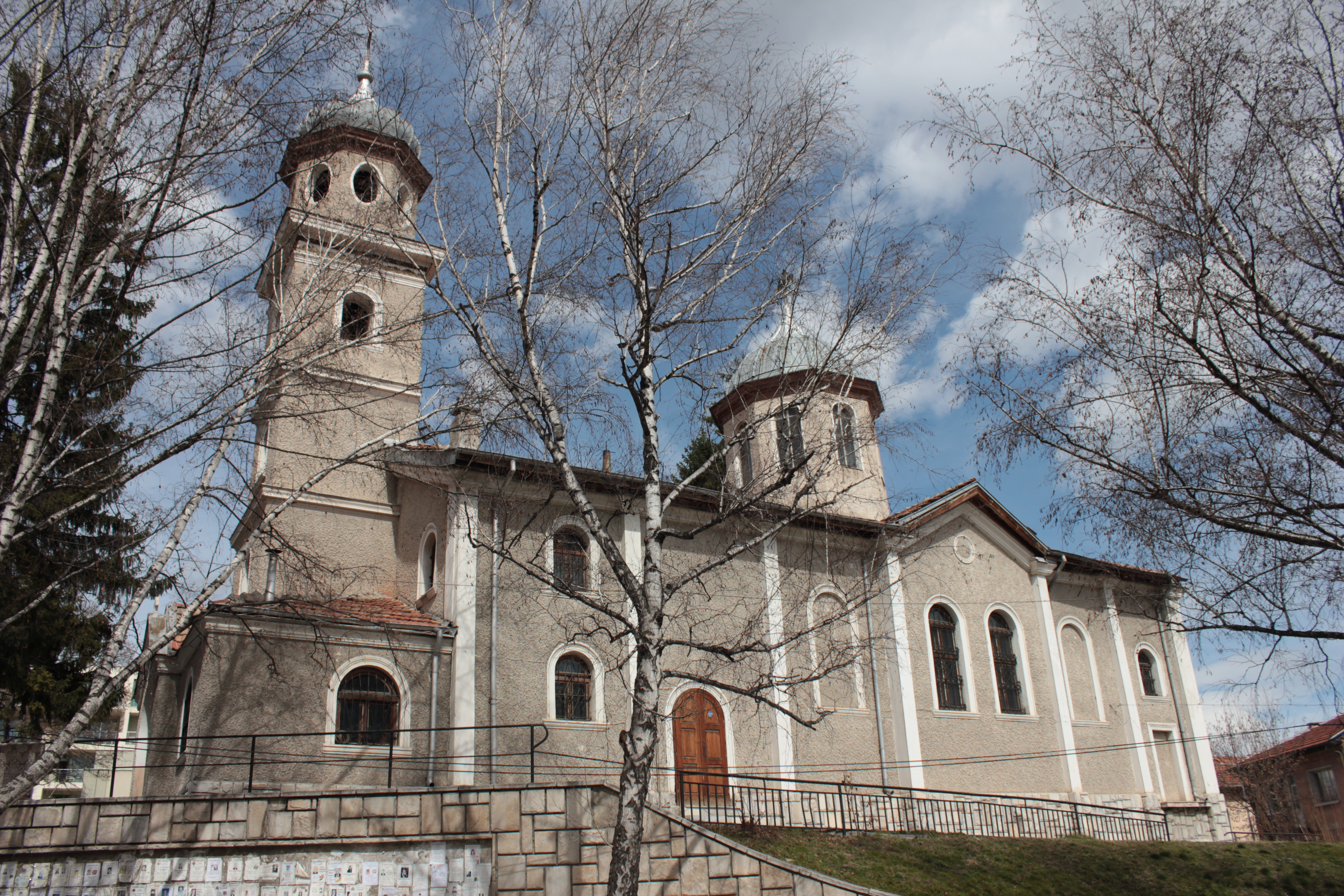
The church of the Dormition of the Mother of God

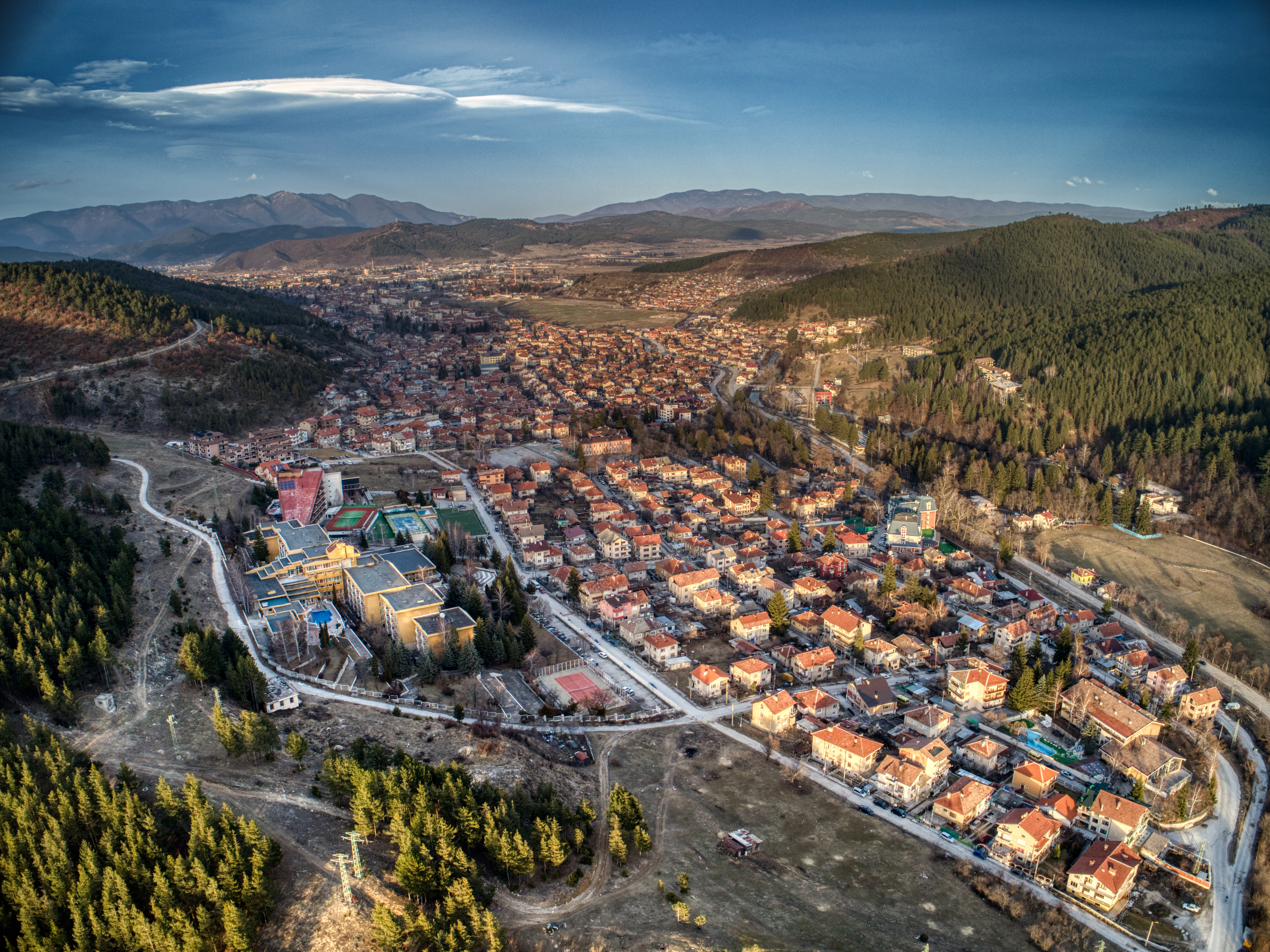
Velingrad from the air

The cultural layers give grounds to claim that the Chepino region was inhabited by Thracian tribes in the 6th-5th century BC. The ancient historians Herodotus and Thucydides provide written records of this era.

The authority and importance of the temple of Dionysius in the Rhodope Mountains is indicated by the fact that Alexander the Great and the father of Octavian Augustus visited it to have the prophetess divine their future.

There are many tombs left from the Thracians - seven in the Batak Marsh (now the bottom of a lake), two mounds in the Yundola area and dozens elsewhere. Ruins of Thracian settlements and fortresses can be seen in the locality of "Pechkovets", at the foot of the medieval fortress of Tsepina, where fragments of Thracian pottery and implements of labour have also been found, and elsewhere.

The Romans conquered the Rhodope Mountains fully after invading Thrace in 45 BC. It began with a mixed Thraco-Roman period that lasted until the arrival of the Slavs. The archaeological finds of settlements and fortifications in the areas to the Roman culture in this region. These are the remains of clay pipelines for mineral water, road pavements, fortifications, marble slabs, coins, etc.

The region was inhabited by the Slavs in the 6th century. According to Bulgarian academics, the Dragovichi tribe lived there. The Dragovichi accepted many Thracian customs, but gave them typical Slavic characteristics. Soon after the Bulgar invasion of the Balkans, the whole region was annexed to the First Bulgarian Empire by Malamir.

Coins from the time of Tsar Ivan Alexander have been found in Chepino. It is believed that the fall of the Tsepina fortress and the whole region under Turkish rule took place in 1371 - 1373. After this event a number of serious changes occurred in the life of the local Bulgarians. The Ottoman Empire needed allies in its centre and began to impose Islam voluntarily or by force as early as the beginning of the 16th century.

The Ottoman register referring to the years 1516 - 1517 indicates the appearance of the first muslims in the area. At that time, there were a total of 624 households in the villages of Chepino, 12 of which were Muslim. The Bulgarians bore names such as Velcho, son of Zlatko, Petko, son of Rayo, Radul, son of Proslav, etc., while 7 households from Lajene used the Arabic Abdullah as their surname, which is usually given to all converts to Islam. These 7 households possessed a full pair, i.e. a piece of land which was believed to be able to provide a good material position for a family.

According to the Pope Metodi Draginov, at the time of the storming of Chepino by Mehmed IV, part of the population was forced to convert to Islam, because the Greek bishop Gavril accused the local population of being disobedient to the pasha in Plovdiv. When the pasha arrived in Chepino, he gathered the princes and demanded to kill them, but they converted to Islam in the hope that they would be spared. Bulgarian Muslims have preserved many of the traditions of the Christian cult.

The population of Chepino did not stay away from the Revival and the national liberation struggles of the Bulgarian people. In 1816 the church ''St. Trinity''. It became a centre where Bulgarian consciousness was strengthened and knowledge and enlightenment were spread. In 1823, a school was opened in the church, initially as a cell school, and later as a class school, housed in a separate building. The first teachers were Iliya Zhdrakov, Peacock Gugalov, Daskal Parthenius, Daskal Nikola Saev, who introduced as a textbook the "Fish Literary", Georgi Cholakov - Grandfather Daskal, Sava Doktorov, Stoyu Maslarov.

During the Russo-Turkish War the Muslim population hid in the mountains or in the more southern settlements. Some villages, such as Ladzhene, became completely depopulated. After a few days of hiding, the inhabitants returned to their homelands.

In 1902, "Sinapovo Zrantse" was founded as socialist society, which in 1905 grew into the first party organization. Later, new party organizations sprang up in Ladzhene-Banya, Rakitovo and Dorkovo.

In 1923, all party organizations in Chepino took part in the September Uprising. After 1927, the Chepino Trough was a hotbed of political life. This was the time of increased cultural and mass activity - lectures, formation of cooperative groups, etc.

In 1947. Todor Yamakov, the mayor of Kamenitsa, took the initiative to unite the three villages of Chepino, Ladzhene and Kamenitsa. When discussing a name for the future town, three proposals took shape. The unification of the villages under the new name of Velingrad (after Vela Peeva) was finally approved in January 1948 by a decree of the Council of Ministers in the State Gazette No. 28 of 5 February 1948. The State Gazette reports on the decree adopted on 28 January 1948 on the merger of the three villages. Chepino and Kamenitsa are older settlements, but Ladzhene was founded after 1878 by Bulgarian refugees from Macedonia, because their region remained under Ottoman rule after the Treaty of Berlin.

== Geography ==
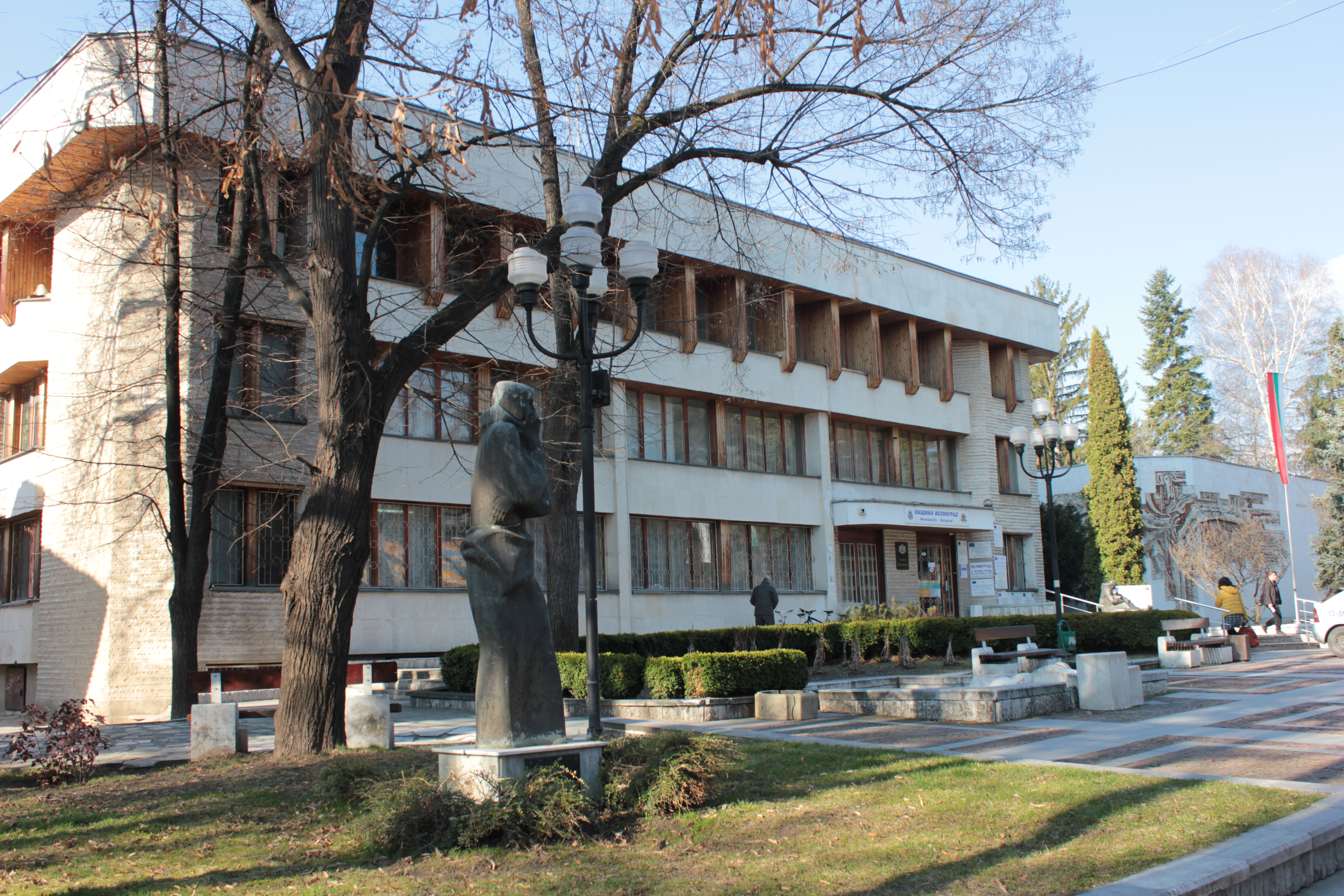
Velingrad town hall

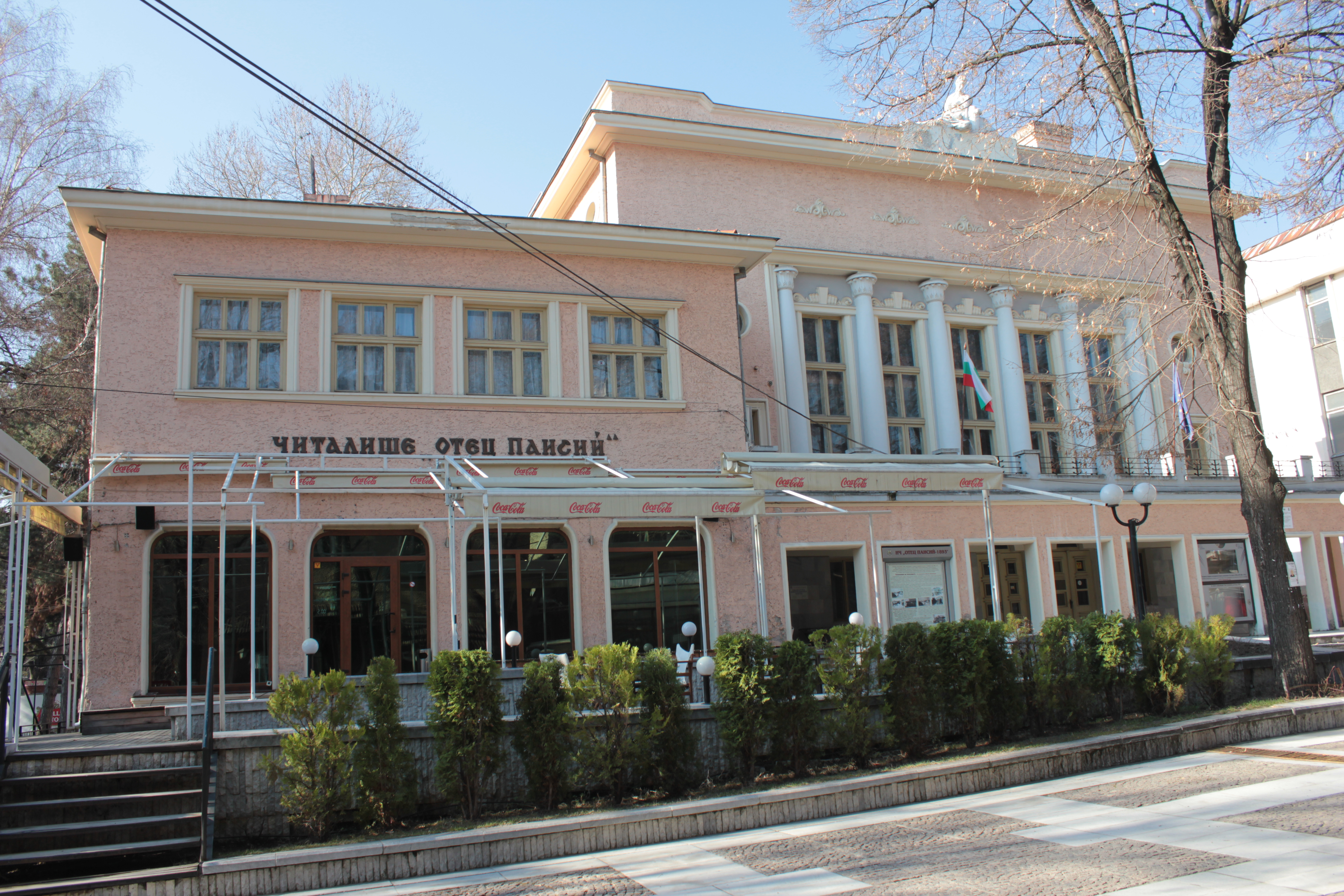
Chitalishte Father Paisius

Velingrad is situated at 750–850 m above sea level. The city has a mountain climate. It is located in the European-continental climate area, on the border with the continental-Mediterranean area. Summers are warm and winters are cold. The average annual temperature is 10 °C, while the average July temperature is 19 °C. The annual duration of sunshine is about 2,000 hours. The relative air humidity ranges from 65 to 75%. Surrounded by age-old pine tree woods, the town favors abundant sunshine.

Velingrad is one of the cloudiest towns in Bulgaria. Cloud cover is highest during the winter months. Its general decrease is observed at the beginning of autumn. It is one of the places in Bulgaria with more rainless days. The presence of clear weather and abundant sunshine is typical for Velingrad. The average annual air temperature is 9 °C.

=== Hydrography ===
Water resources in the region of Velingrad - rivers, karst and mineral springs are abundant. They are a factor in determining people's residence, their economic activity and the development of tourism in general. Numerous clear mountain streams and rivulets unite in the river Chepinska reka. Its most important streams are Gruncharitsa, Lukovitsa, Lepenitsa, Mutnitsa and Trebetushchitsa. The dams in the area diversify the natural environment, positively change the microclimate and significantly increase the attractiveness of the landscape. Velingrad has a number of karst springs such as Kleptuza.

There are more than 90 mineral water springs with curative and preventive properties in and around the town. The mineral waters (from springs and wells) vary considerably in temperature, mineralization, radon, silicic acid and fluorine content, and are suitable for treatment of a wide range of diseases. 9000 litres of water per minute spring from the five thermal and mineral deposits in Ladzhene, Kamenitsa, Chepino, Rakitovo and Kostandovo.

The Velingrad geothermal field is the largest in Southern Bulgaria. The total flow rate of the springs is 160 L/s, and only in Chepino is 70 L/s. The mineral springs (80 in number), the mild climate and the beautiful nature are the great wealth of the town. Velingrad is one of the largest spa resorts in Bulgaria and is known as the "Spa Capital of the Balkans". There are numerous sanatoriums, resorts, modern spas and hotels here.

Together with the numerous mineral waters, Velingrad boasts another natural phenomenon as well — the Kleptuza, the biggest Karst spring in Bulgaria, with an average discharge of 1200 litres of ice-cold water per second.

In Ladzhene, the springs are divided into 3 groups. The westernmost group at Velova Banya consists of 18 springs; at the men's and women's baths there are 11 springs and at the melting pot - 7 springs. The water in Ladzhene contains 5.5 mg/L fluorine, which exceeds the bottling standard and is not recommended for prolonged daily drinking. It can be used for drinking treatment for which the balneological criterion is up to 8 mg/L.

In Kamenitsa, water is the hottest. There are 8 springs, of which the most important are the springs of Syarna Banya and Vlasa. The water has the highest fluorine content of 8.6 mg/L and is suitable only for banya treatment and for fluoride prophylaxis under special dosages.

A spring with a high fluorine content is located near the Yellow Rock. The rock is an interesting natural landmark. It is located on the Karkaria Ridge, near the Cepina Fortress. It offers a panoramic view of the Chepino Valley, Mount Syutka and the Alabak Ridge.

== Districts ==
=== Chepino ===
Chepino is the southernmost of the three districts of Velingrad. Before the foundation of the town, the district was the village of Banya Chepinskaya, which was renamed in 1934 to the village of Chepino (after the Chepino valley). Its name has undergone changes (Banya, Banya-Chepino, Chepino-Banya, Chepino).

=== Ladzhene ===
The central district of Velingrad. It contains the building of Velingrad Municipality, the central post office, the district court, the central cooperative market and other institutions. Ladzhene was once a feudal chiflik, around which a settlement was established due to the presence of mineral springs and baths.

=== Kamenitsa ===
The district is the largest of them all in Velingrad. One of the oldest Bulgarian churches is located in the district. The floor of its altar was used for hiding weapons during the Russo-Turkish War (1877–1878).

== Economy and infrastructure ==
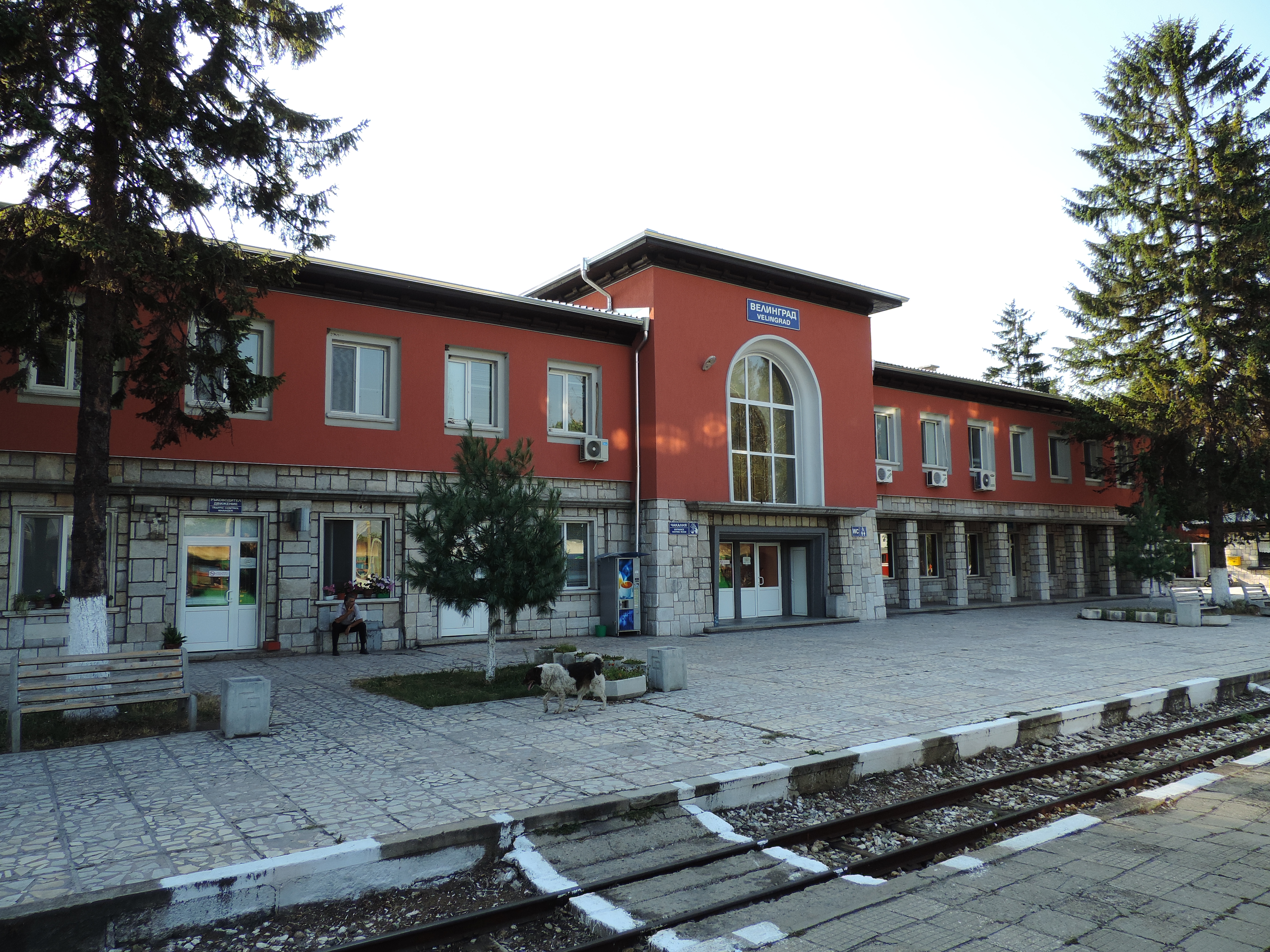
Velingrad railway station

=== Economy ===
The structure and development of the economy in Velingrad is largely determined by the available natural resources and long-standing traditions. The main structural economic sectors are the timber and wood processing industry, tourism, small and medium-sized enterprises and agriculture. Some leading and traditional industries of 10-15 years ago - mechanical engineering, chemical industry, marble mining and processing, wood board production are no longer functioning as a result of the transition to a market economy and privatisation. Only the chemical industry plant Crystal and mechanical engineering plant Kentavar have survived. The GDP in 1998 amounted to 45 million dollars and by this indicator the municipality ranks 51st among the municipalities in Bulgaria. GDP per capita for the same period was BGN 2 719.

The sectors of industrial production include: timber and wood processing, furniture manufacturing, machine building, cosmetics and chemical products manufacturing, marble processing, mineral water bottling, tailoring, carpet making.

In the industrial enterprises, net sales revenues have increased continuously over the last five years.

=== Transport ===
The town is connected by the only narrow-gauge railway line in Bulgaria with the Septemvri station, the towns of Razlog and Bansko and the Dobrinishte station. The station is in the central district of Ladzhene, and in the quarter Chepino has a railway station Velingrad-South.

== Demographics ==
=== Population ===
Velingrad
Year	1887	1910	1934	1946	1956	1965	1975	1985	1992	2001	2005	2009	2011	2021
Population	??	??	10,782	12,592	18,146	20,077	23,848	25,432	25,634	24,818	24,117	23,780	22,602	20,826
	Highest number 25,634 in 1992													
Sources: National Statistical Institute, citypopulation.de, pop-stat.mashke.org, Bulgarian Academy of Sciences??

=== Religion ===
In the town most of the inhabitants are Orthodox Christians, in the surrounding villages the population is composed mainly of Muslim Bulgarians (Pomaks). They are ethnic Bulgarians with Bulgarian as their mother tongue, but profess Islam. Islam has spread slowly and gradually in the Chepino valley. The number of Muslims was also increased afterwards when the Greek Patriarchate imposed exorbitant taxes on the Christian population who refused to pay them. Then the Greek bishop Gabriel of Plovdiv complained to the pasha, who went to settle the accounts. Some of the rebellious population chose to convert to Islam rather than pay the corresponding levies to the Greek Church.

There is also a Congregational community in the city, part of the Union of Evangelical Congregational Churches.

Ottoman registers from 1516-1712
Year	Muslim families
1516	10%
1528	12%
1570	26%
1595	31%
1640	50%
1712	89%

Velingrad has an Aromanian community, being one of the few places in Bulgaria where Aromanians live. An Aromanian cultural organization exists in Velingrad.

== Culture, education and architecture ==
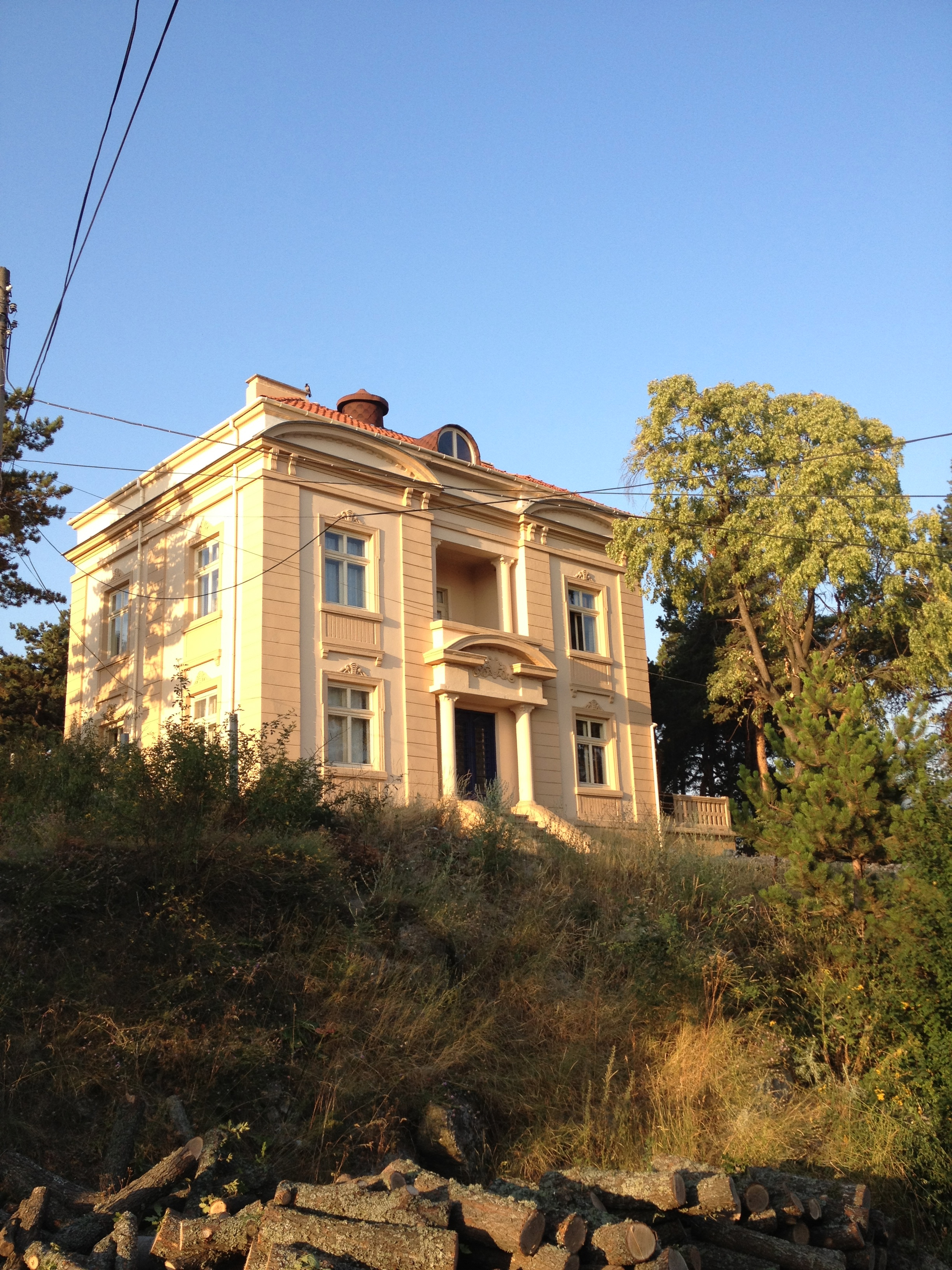
Villa "Raina", Velingrad, Bulgaria

There are eight schools (five of them high schools), three reference libraries (chitalishtes), about 100 hotels (some of which five-star), a stadium and a city orchestra.

The Villa Raîna is a Néo-Renaissance villa in the city's area of Ldžene (Bulgarian: Лъдженe) and was designed in 1928 by a renowned pre-WWII Serbian architect Milutin Borisavljević (1889-1970). Initially, "Raina" was conceived as the summer house of the Belgrade based industrialist, Stojadin "Stole" Stevović (1888-1945), for the needs of the families Stevović and Simić. The site selected was a hilltop just outside the city of Velingrad, locally called the "Acropolis". The design mainly reflected the values of French Renaissance architecture but with discreet decorative features in the then fashionable Art Deco style. The house was nationalized in 1946, and transformed into a sanatorium for the treatment of infectious diseases. In 1992 the Villa Raina was restituted to Stevović's heirs (families Krsmanović-Simić and Gillès de Pélichy). The summer house is today protected by law as a cultural and historical monument of regional importance.

== Balneology and tourism ==
The natural environment, climatic features, and mineral springs favourable for the treatment of a number of diseases make Velingrad a tourist destination for Bulgarian as well as foreign citizens. On the territory of the city there are 3 sanatoriums, over 60 hotels, 140 restaurants and entertainment venues. Six holiday complexes have been modernised, offering all types of balneological services. Public mineral baths have been improved and 22 outdoor and indoor mineral pools have been built.

In Velingrad there is a possibility for treatment of lung and joint diseases, neurological and gynecological problems (including infertility), kidney, liver, gastrointestinal and many other problems. Spa treatment is carried out by drinking mineral water, inhalations, baths and rinses.

== Landmarks ==
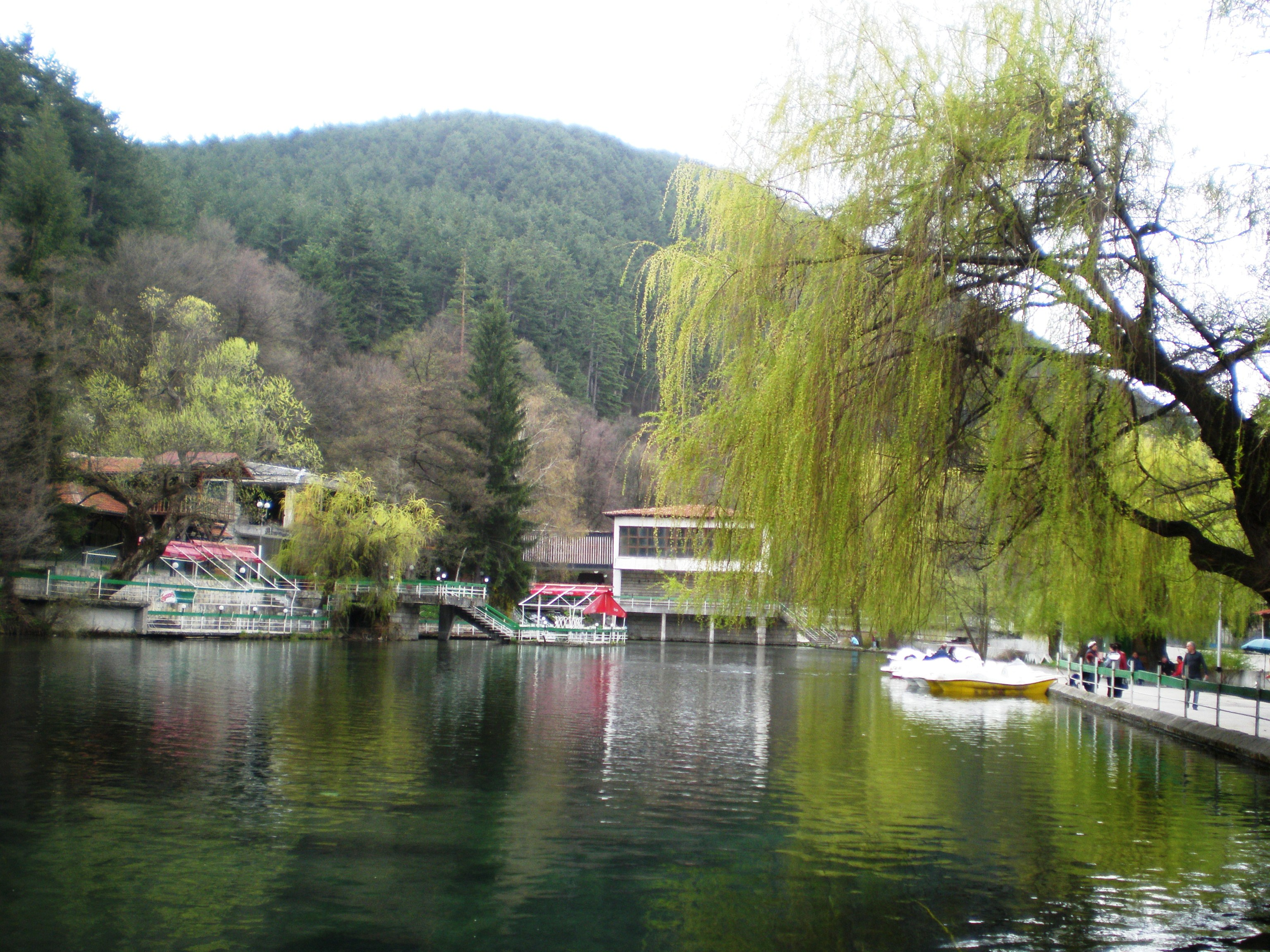
Kleptuza

=== Kleptuza ===
Among the landmarks of Velingrad is the Kleptuza karst spring with a flow of 600 to 1200 L/s. The park with its two lakes is one of the symbols of the town. It is located in the Chepino district, which is one of the three thermal zones in Velingrad. A large part of the spring water is used for drinking purposes; the other part feeds two lakes, which then flow into the Chepinskaya River, and from there into the Maritsa and the White Sea. Pine forests stretch south from the karst spring and have been turned into a natural park. The park was built with own funds by the former rural municipality of Chepino - Banya, and the first lake was established in 1933.

=== Velingrad History Museum ===
The beginning of the museum work in the Chepino region was laid in 1909 by Hristo Maslarov. On his initiative the community centre in the village of. Kamenitsa, an Archaeological Museum was established, approved by the Ministry of Education. In the following decades, many testimonies about the past of this region were collected in school and community museum collections. On this basis, the Velingrad City History Museum was established in 1952. Later it was transformed into the house museum "Vela Peeva". In 1991, the Ministry of Culture decided to change its status again to the Historical Museum - Velingrad. Archaeology, Renaissance, Ethnography, New and Recent History and Art Departments were formed. More than 19,000 archaeological finds, objects of old life, icons, old printed books, personal belongings and archives of famous personalities, photographs and documents are stored and studied in them. The museum has a special building built in 1982 with spacious and comfortable exhibition halls. In them are presented the permanent exhibitions on Vela Peeva, an ethnographic exhibition, an exhibition on painted Easter eggs and an exhibition on Nikolay Giaurov.

== Sports ==
The city's football club is Chepinets Velingrad.

== Honour ==
Velingrad Peninsula in Graham Land, Antarctica is named after the city.

== Notable people ==
- Atanas Semerdzhiev (1924 - 2015) - partisan, general and politician, Vice President of Bulgaria (1990 - 1992)
- Vela Peeva (1922 - 1944) - partisan, after whom the city is named
- Nicolai Ghiaurov (1929 - 2004) - opera singer, performer, intellectual
- Margarita Popova (b. 1956) - Minister of Justice (2009 - 2011) and Vice President of Bulgaria (2012 - 2017)
- Lydia Shouleva (b. 1956) - politician, Deputy Prime Minister (2001 - 2005), Minister of Labor and Social Policy (2001 - 2003), Minister of Economy (2003 - 2005)
- Vasil Bozhkov (b. 1956) is a businessman
- Vlado Chernozemski (1897 - 1934) - a revolutionary
- Tsvetan Golomeev (1962 - 2010) - swimmer
- Dimo Tonev (b. 1964) is a volleyball player
- Georgi Gadzhev (b. 1964) is a football player
- Nedko Milenov (b. 1978) is a football player
