= Velingrad Municipality =

Municipality in Pazardzhik Province, Bulgaria

Coordinates: 42°01′N 24°00′E

- Interactive map of Velingrad Municipality
- Country: Bulgaria
- Province: Pazardzhik Province

Population
  - Total: 40,595

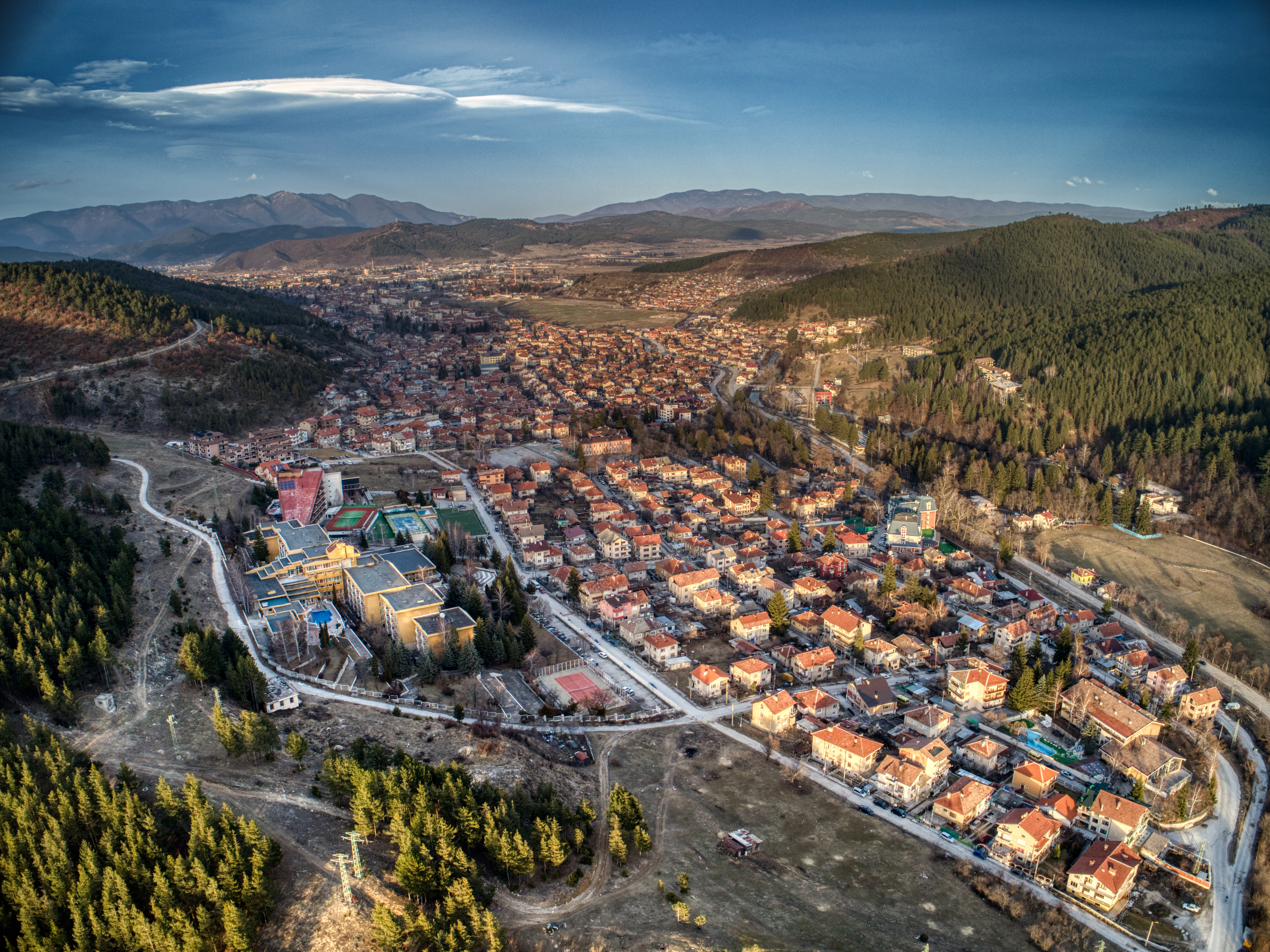
Aerial view of Velingrad.

Velingrad Municipality (Bulgarian: Община Велинград) is the largest municipality in Pazardzhik Province, Bulgaria. The municipality consists of its capital, Velingrad as well as two villages, with a total population of 40,595.

The municipality of Velingrad is mostly inhabited by ethnic Bulgarians, which are Orthodox and Muslim (Pomaks) by religion.

== Demographic situation ==
The municipality of Velingrad has relatively favourable demographic indicators compared with the rest of Bulgaria. Nevertheless, the number of births dropped sharply while the number of deaths remained fairly constant. This led to a negative natural growth rate.

| | Population | Live births | Deaths | Natural growth | Birth rate (‰) | Death rate (‰) | Natural growth rate (‰) |
| 2000 | 43,591 | 502 | 495 | +7 | 11.5 | 11.4 | +0.1 |
| 2001 | 42,665 | 454 | 423 | +31 | 10.6 | 9.9 | +0.7 |
| 2002 | 42,416 | 426 | 425 | +1 | 10.0 | 10.0 | +0.0 |
| 2003 | 42,306 | 440 | 478 | -38 | 10.4 | 11.3 | -0.9 |
| 2004 | 42,029 | 456 | 497 | -41 | 10.8 | 11.8 | -1.0 |
| 2005 | 41,906 | 455 | 481 | -26 | 10.9 | 11.5 | -0.6 |
| 2006 | 41,899 | 493 | 496 | -3 | 11.8 | 11.9 | -0.1 |
| 2007 | 41,753 | 487 | 483 | +4 | 11.7 | 11.6 | +0.1 |
| 2008 | 41,718 | 506 | 482 | +24 | 12.1 | 11.6 | +0,6 |
| 2009 | 41,613 | 514 | 510 | +4 | 12.4 | 12.3 | +0.1 |
| 2010 | 41,366 | 474 | 487 | -13 | 11.5 | 11.8 | -0.3 |
| 2011 | 40,595 | 462 | 478 | -16 | 11.4 | 11.8 | -0.4 |
| 2012 | 40,390 | 451 | 486 | -35 | 11.2 | 12.0 | -0.8 |
| 2013 | 40,148 | 415 | 484 | -69 | 10.3 | 12.1 | -1.7 |
| 2014 | 39,785 | 409 | 535 | -126 | 10.3 | 13.4 | -3.2 |
| 2015 | 34,511 | 354 | 496 | -142 | 10.3 | 14.4 | -4.1 |
| 2016 | 34,281 | 361 | 480 | -119 | 10.5 | 14.0 | -3.5 |
| 2017 | 34,045 | 357 | 489 | -132 | 10.5 | 14.4 | -3.9 |
| 2018 | 33,787 | 366 | 480 | -114 | 10.8 | 14.2 | -3.4 |

=== Religion ===
According to the latest Bulgarian census of 2011, the religious composition, among those who answered the optional question on religious identification, was the following:

Religious composition of Velingrad Municipality
| Orthodox Christianity | 44.1% |
| Catholicism | 0.3% |
| Protestantism | 0.8% |
| Islam | 43.8% |
| No religion | 2.9% |
| Prefer not to answer, others and aindefinable | 8.1% |

The municipality of Velingrad is nearly equally divided between believers belonging to the Bulgarian Orthodox Church and Islam. Most Christians live in the town of Velingrad, while the Muslims (mostly Pomaks) live in mountainous villages.
