= Pazardzhik Province =

Province in southern Bulgaria

Coordinates: 42°5′N 24°15′E

Pazardzhik Province Област Пазарджик
- Province
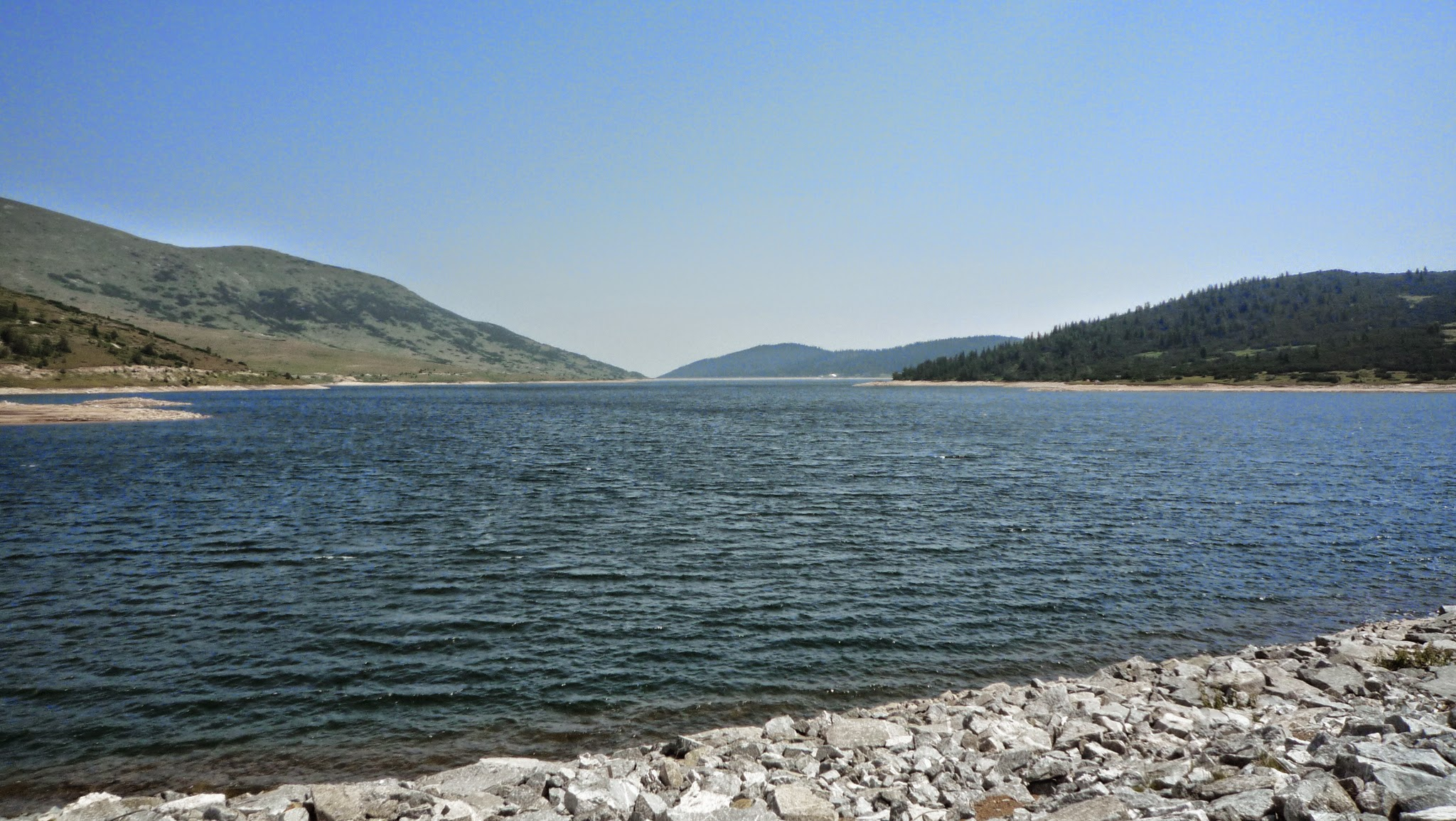
- Belmeken Dam

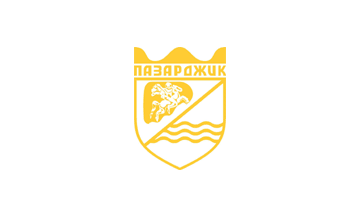
- Flag

- Location of Pazardzhik Province in Bulgaria
- Country: Bulgaria
- Capital: Pazardzhik
- Municipalities: 12

Government
  - Governor: Stefan Mirev

Area
  - Total: 4,456.9 km^{2} (1,720.8 sq mi)

Population (December 2022)
  - Total: 226,209
  - Density: 50.755/km^{2} (131.45/sq mi)
- Time zone: UTC+2 (EET)
  - Summer (DST): UTC+3 (EEST)
- License plate: PA
- Website: pz.government.bg

Pazardzhik Province (Bulgarian: Област Пазарджик Oblast Pazardzhik, former name Pazardzhik okrug) is a province in Southern Bulgaria, named after its administrative and industrial centre: the city of Pazardzhik. The territory is 4,456.9 km^{2} (1,720.8 sq mi) that is divided into 12 municipalities with a total population of 275,548 inhabitants, as of February 2011.

== History ==
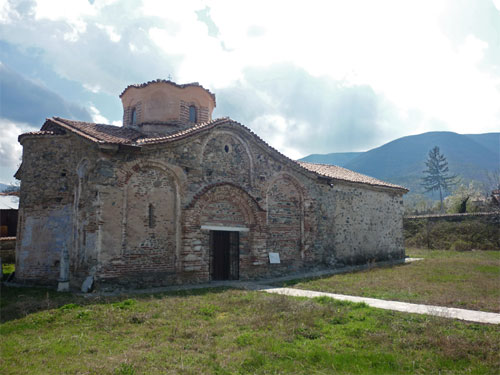
The medieval Church of St Demetrius in Patalenitsa

The territory of the Pazardzhik Province has been inhabited since very early times. There are more than 50 discovered Stone Age and Bronze Age settlements. The earliest civilization to inhabit the region were the Thracians. The remains of the Thracian town Besapara are located in the hills near the provincial capital Pazardzhik. The Panagyurishte Treasure unearthed near the northern town of the same name is known as one of the finest examples of Thracian art. The 6.164 kg of 23-karat gold treasure which consists of nine vessels has been dated back to the 4th and 3rd century BC. In the 1st century BC the region became a Roman province and remained in the Byzantine Empire after the fall of Rome.

Most of the region became part of the Bulgarian Empire in the beginning of the 9th century and remained in Bulgarian hands until the fall of the First Empire. With the rise of the Second Bulgarian Empire the region once again became part of the country until it was overran by the Ottomans in the late 14th century. Some of medieval fortresses are Tsepina near the village of Dorkovo and Krasen in the vicinities of Bata.

The April Uprising of 1876 against the Ottoman rule was widely supported within the region and the town of Panagyurishte became the center of the uprising. The Bulgarian population also rebelled to the south where the Ottoman atrocities culminated in the Batak massacre. The massacre included 8,000 people killed and one of the deadliest massacres in Bulgarian history. According to the Treaty of Berlin after the Liberation of Bulgaria in 1878 the region was included in the autonomous region Eastern Rumelia. It included the okolias Pazardzhik, Peshtera, Ihtiman, Koprivshtitsa and Panagyurishte. The department was later incorporated into the new Principality of Bulgaria on 6 September 1885.

The first reported Red Army troops in the region were in Pazardzhik on 23 September 1944, where the Soviet command was headed by Dimitry Gorunkov. Territorial changes were made, as Sarnitsa was transferred from Devinska okolia to Pazardzhik okolia in 1949. A concentration camp was established with the name Camp ''C''. Demonstrations were held in 1989 with more than 5,000 people alone in the administrative capital.

Sarnitsa Municipality became the newest municipality in the province, as well as in Bulgaria on 1 January 2015.

== Geography ==
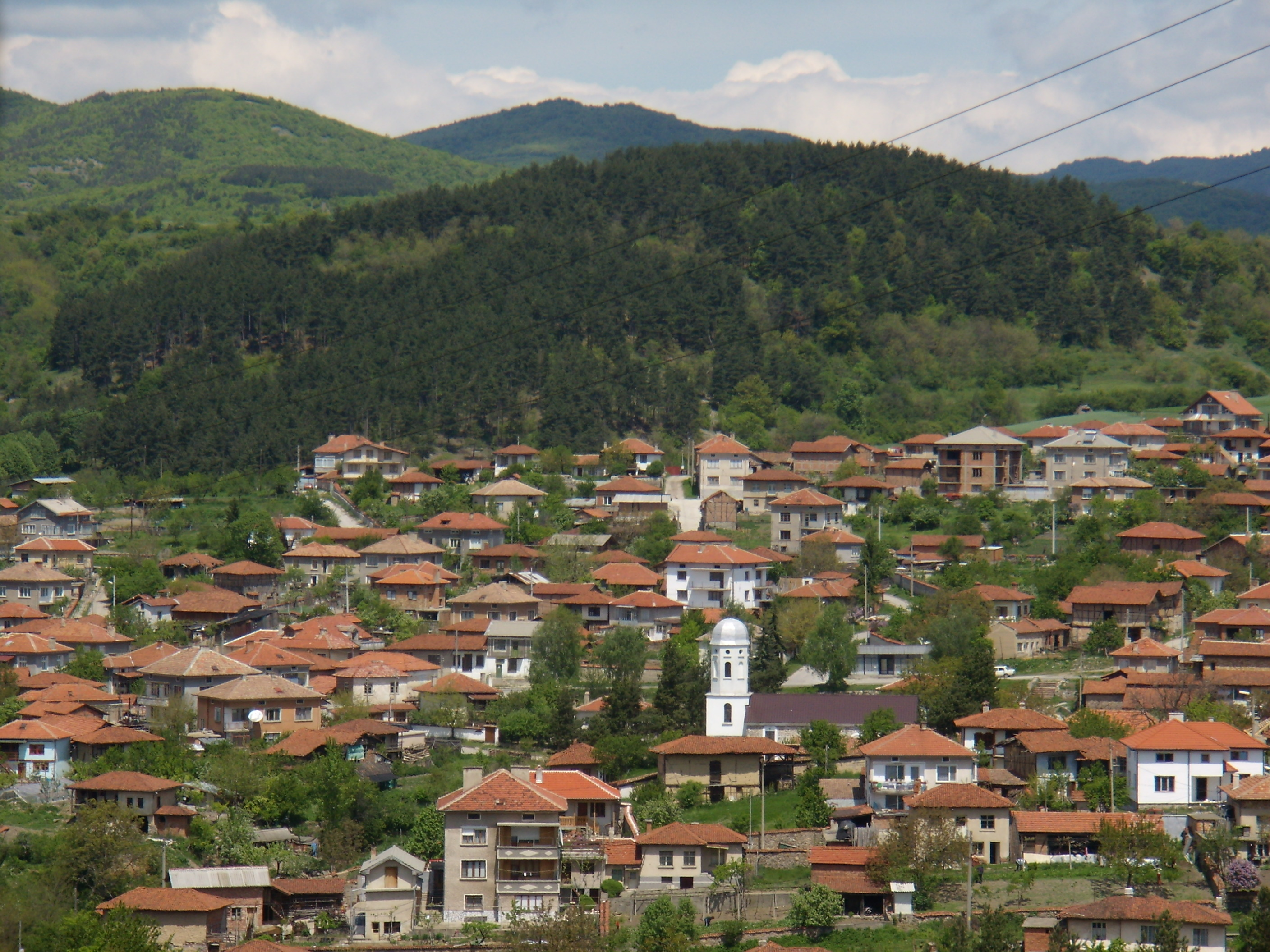
The village of Oborishte.

The Pazardzhik Province is situated in central part of southern Bulgaria and borders the provinces of Plovdiv, Smolyan, Blagoevgrad and Sofia. The total area of the region is 4,458 km^{2} which is 4% of the national territory. Forests account for more than half of the area (57.1%); the arable land is 35.6%, urban territory is 3.3%, rivers and lakes occupy 2.6%, road infrastructure - 0.6% and quarries and mines - 0,4%.

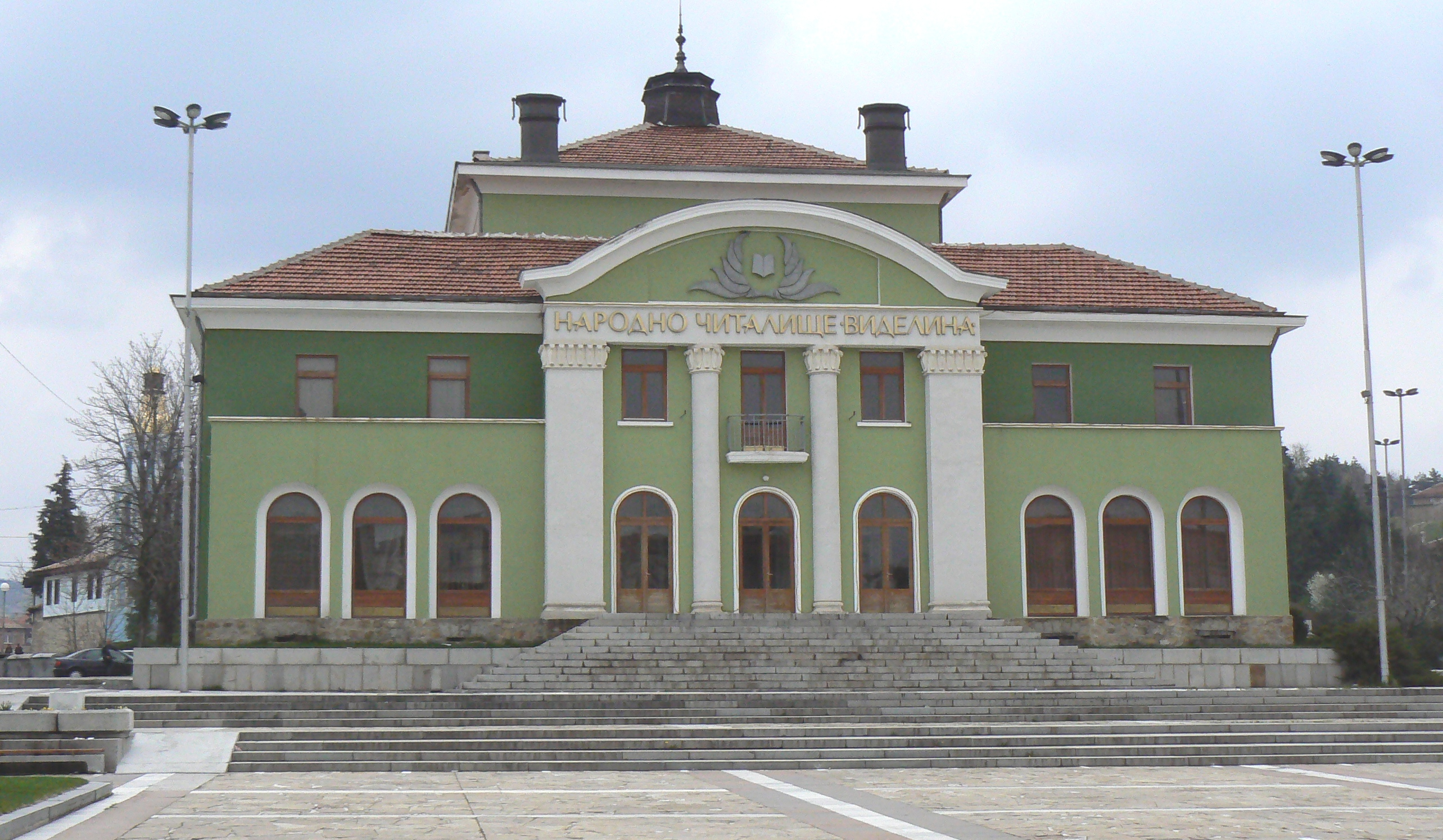
The chitalishte "Videlina" in Panagyurishte.

The northern parts of the region include the middle ridges of the Sredna Gora mountain range, to the south the relief flattens and forms the westernmost parts of the Upper Thracian Plain and to the south are located the Rhodope Mountains where most of the forests are situated. The highest point of the region is Savov Vrah in the Rila mountain range at an altitude of 2,306 m while the lowest altitude is around 200 m in the plains of the central area. The climate is transcontinental with milder winter than northern Bulgaria in the lowlands but with very low temperatures and high snowfall in the mountain areas. The average annual temperature is 11.3 °C.

The province is abundant in water resources, its main waterway is the river Maritsa and its catchment basin includes the Topolnitsa River and Luda Yana River from the north and Stara Reka from the south. There are three main reservoirs all situated in the Rhodope Mountains within the municipal limits of Batak - Batak Reservoir, Golyam Beglik and Shiroka Polyana. A fourth large dam lake, the Dospat Reservoir is only partially in the region. In Sredna Gora to the north is the Topolnitsa Reservoir shared with the Sofia Province and a dam near Panagyurishte which is in initial stages of construction.

== Municipalities ==
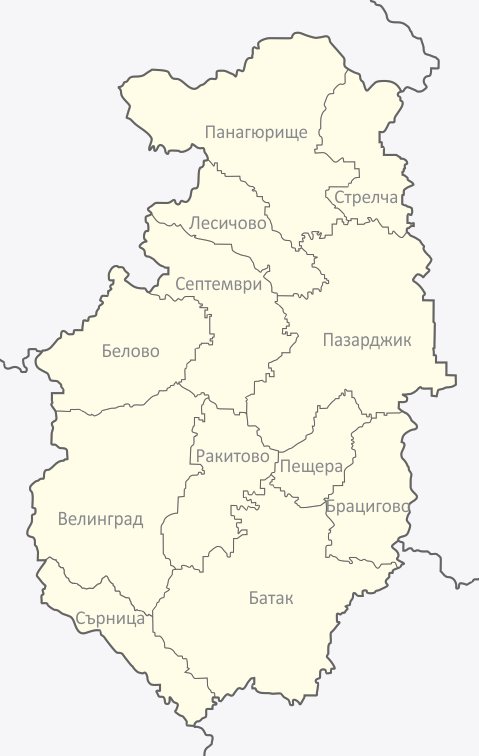
Map of Pazardzik Province

The Pazardzik province (област, oblast) contains 12 municipalities (Bulgarian: община, romanized: obshtina - plural: общини, obshtini). The following table shows the names of each municipality in English and Cyrillic, the main town or village (towns are shown in bold), and the population of each as of December 2009.

Municipality	Cyrillic	Population	Area (km^{2})	Density (persons per km^{2})	Administrative centre town/village	Population of the centre
Pazardzhik	Пазарджик	121,366	636.8	190.59	**Pazardzhik**	75,346
Velingrad	Велинград	41,613	803.2	51.81	**Velingrad**	23,686
Septemvri	Септември	27,304	361.3	75.57	**Septemvri**	8,422
Panagyurishte	Панагюрище	26,095	589.5	44.27	**Panagyurishte**	17,959
Peshtera	Пещера	21,691	135.4	160.20	**Peshtera**	19,363
Rakitovo	Ракитово	15,482	246.6	62.78	**Rakitovo**	8,261
Bratsigovo	Брацигово	10,290	229.4	44.86	**Bratsigovo**	4,452
Belovo	Белово	9,282	336.2	27.61	**Belovo**	3,837
Batak	Батак	6,331	677.2	9.35	**Batak**	3,498
Lesichovo	Лесичово	5,809	208.9	27.81	Lesichovo	975
Strelcha	Стрелча	5,351	224.5	23.84	**Strelcha**	4,273
Sarnitsa	Сърница	4,952	198.6	24.93	**Sarnitsa**	3,579
**Total**		**295,566**	**4,456.9**	**65.2**		

== Demographics ==
Historical population
Year	Pop.	±%
1946	247,014	—
1956	278,777	+12.9%
1965	296,641	+6.4%
1975	314,006	+5.9%
1985	325,971	+3.8%
1992	326,123	+0.0%
2001	310,723	−4.7%
2011	275,548	−11.3%
2021	229,814	−16.6%
Source: pop-stat.mashke.org

The Pazardzhik province had a population of 310,741 (310,723 also given) according to a 2001 census, of which 49.3% were male and 50.7% were female.

As of the end of 2009, the population of the province, announced by the Bulgarian National Statistical Institute, numbered 290,614 of which 22.7% are inhabitants aged over 60 years.

Total population (2011 census): 275,548

=== Ethnic groups ===
Ethnic groups in Pazardzhik Province (2011 census)
Ethnic group	Percentage
Bulgarians	83.8%
Romani	8.3%
Turks	5.7%
others and indefinable	2.2%

Total population (2011 census): 275,548
Ethnic groups (2011 census): Identified themselves: 246,002 persons:

- Bulgarians: 206,110 (83.78%)
- Romani: 20,350 (8.27%)
- Turks: 14,062 (5.72%)
- Others and indefinable: 5,480 (2.23%)

A further 30,000 persons in Pazardzhik Province did not declare their ethnic group at the 2011 census.

Ethnic groups in the province according to 2001 census: 261,260 Bulgarians (84.1%),
23,970 Romani (7.7%), 20,448 Turks (6.6%) and 5,045 others and unspecified (1.6%).

=== Languages ===
Mother tongues in the province according to 2001 census: 260,817 Bulgarian (83.9%),
24,204 Romani (7.8%), 21,902 Turkish (7%) and 3800 others and unspecified (1.2%).

=== Religion ===
Religions in Pazardzhik Province (2011 census)
Religious group	Percentage
Orthodox Christian	58.48%
Muslim	8.83%
Protestant Christian	1.15%
Roman Catholic Christian	0.3%
others and indefinable	31.2%

Religious adherence in the province according to 2001 census:

Census 2001
religious adherence	population	%
Orthodox Christians	250,556	80.64%
Muslims	46,338	14.91%
Protestants	2,913	0.94%
Roman Catholics	260	0.08%
Other	1,142	0.37%
Religion not mentioned	9,514	3.06%
total	310,723	100%

== Economy ==
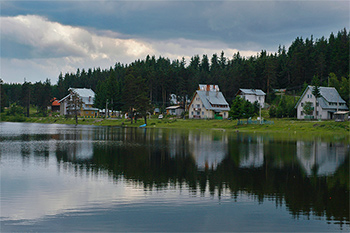
Shiroka Polyana Reservoir.

The backbone of the economy in the region is industry. The Batak Hydropower Cascade is an important hydrocomplex consisting of three hydro power plants- "Batak", "Peshtera" and "Aleko" with combined capacity of 254 MW. Copper extracting industry is of national and European importance with major mines located around Panagyurishte (Asarel Medet), Elshitsa and Tsar Asen. Machine building industry is developed in Pazardzhik (lead acid batteries), Panagyurishte (optical), Velingrad. There is flourishing pharmaceutical industry in Peshtera with more than 1 000 employees in the plant. Paper industry is developed in Belovo. Timber industry is very important in the southern part of the region (the Rhodopes)- Batak, Peshtera, Rakitovo and Velingrad. The manufacturing of textiles is well developed in Pazardzhik, Panagyurishte and Velingrad. There is a huge footwear plant in Peshtera. Food processing industry is developed in most of the towns. Agriculture is also important, especially in the fertile central parts of the region. The most important crops are orchards (apples, plums and strawberries), grapes, wheat, barley, rye and rice. Livestock breeding is relatively well developed in the mountainous areas.

=== Tourism ===
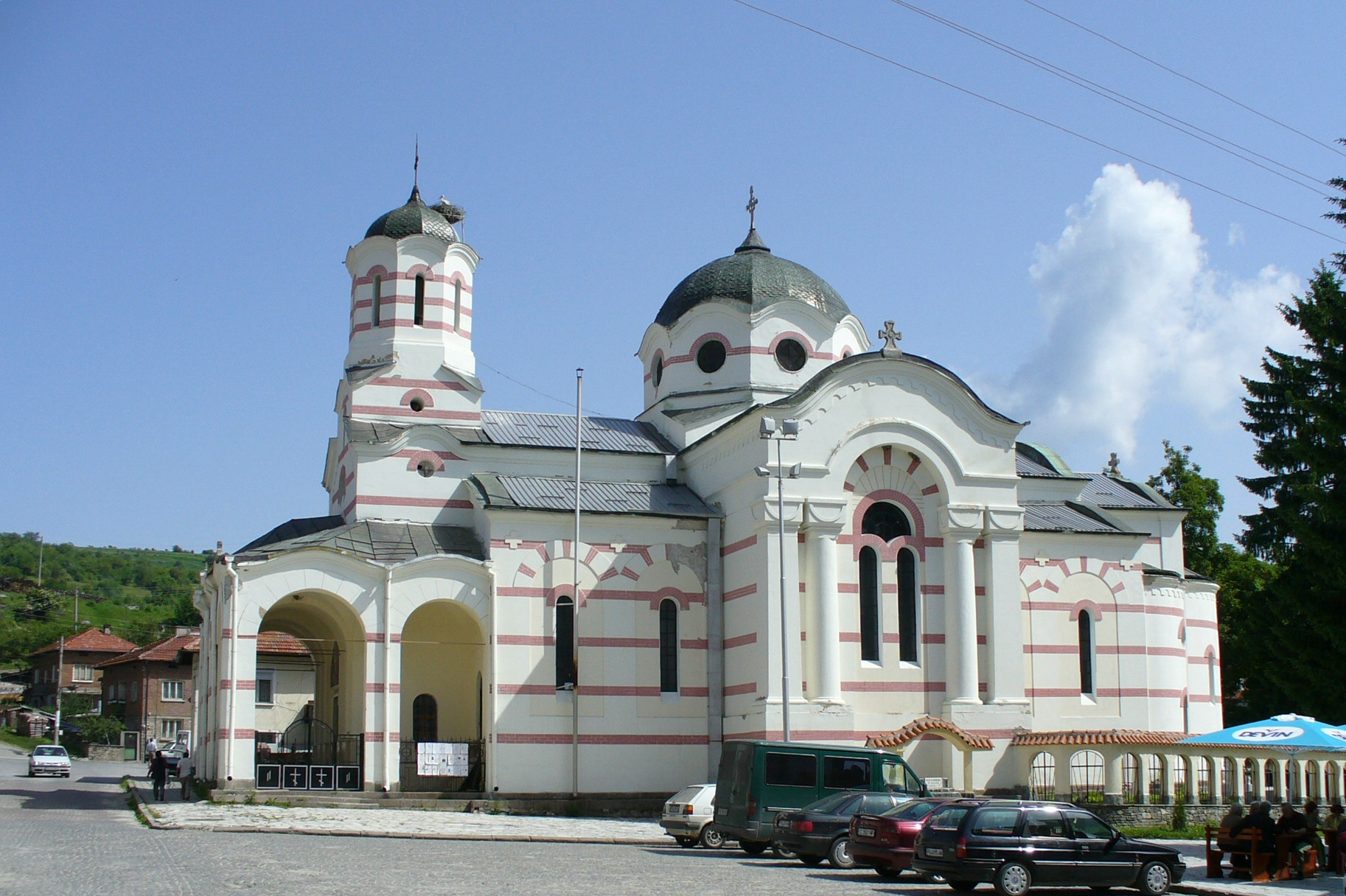
A church in Batak.

The province has considerable opportunities to develop mountain and rural tourism, especially in the southern parts where the Rhodope mountains are located. The slopes are covered with dense deciduous and higher up, coniferous forests, dotted with numerous artificial lakes. The largest one is the Batak Dam, on whose shores are built two resorts: Tsigov Chark and Saint Konstantin as well as many villas and shrines. Fish is abundant in the dams, including carp, rudd, roach barbel, perch, zander and many others; the mountain streams are rich in trout. There are spa resorts in Velingrad, Strelcha, Banya, Varvara. The most famous landmarks are located in Panagyurishte, Pazardzhik, Batak, Velingrad.

Impressive ruins of an ancient Belovo Basilica rise in the hilly country, close to the town of Belovo. Numerous ruined fortresses are scattered around the province, the most famous of these are Tsepina, Peristera and the ramparts near Bata and Strelcha. The medieval Church of St Demetrius in the village of Patalenitsa has frescoes dating to the 12th–13th century.

== Transportation and communications ==
The road network is not dense. The Trakia motorway runs through the middle of the region in direction west–east. Other important roads include the first class I-8 road parallel to the motorway and the second class II-37 road in direction north–south. The main railway between Sofia and Plovdiv also runs through it. There are two other railways: to Panagyurishte and to Peshtera. There are several small airports. As everywhere in Bulgaria, every town and village in the region is provided with electricity, drinking water, telephone network, Internet connection and the cellular phone services.

== See also ==
- Provinces of Bulgaria
- List of villages in Pazardzhik Province
