= Septemvri–Dobrinishte narrow-gauge line =

Railway line in Bulgaria

Septemvri–Dobrinishte
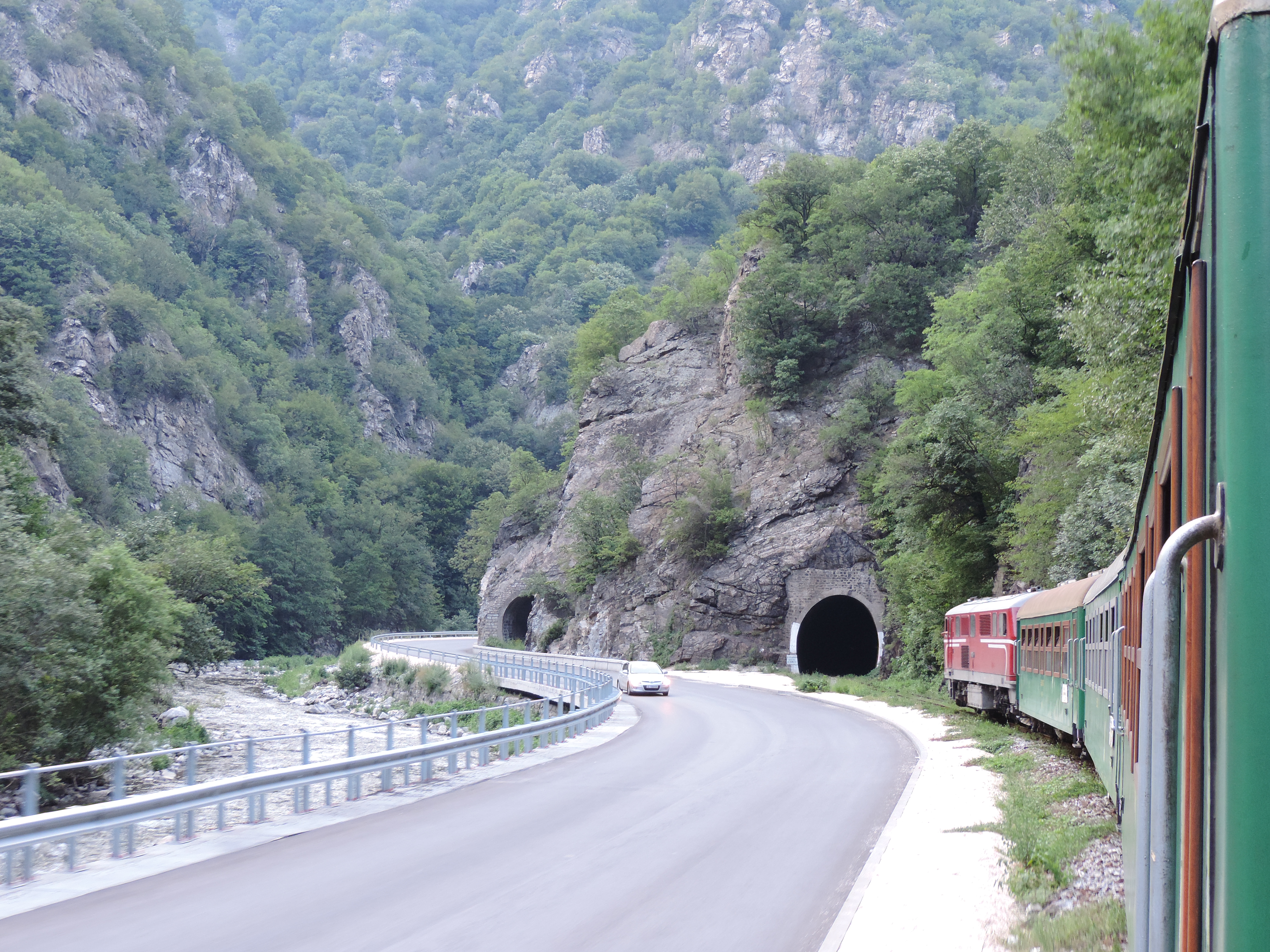
- Septemvri–Dobrinishte narrow-gauge line

Overview
- Status: Operating
- Owner: NRIC
- Locale: Rhodope and Rila mountains, Bulgaria
- Termini: Septemvri 42°12′14″N 24°7′50″E; Dobrinishte 41°49′31″N 23°33′44″E
- Stations: 25

Service
- Type: Narrow-gauge heavy rail
- System: Bulgarian railways
- Route number: 16 / 116
- Train number(s): 16XXX
- Operator(s): BDZ

History
- Opened: Aug 1, 1926 / Dec 9, 1945

Technical
- Line length: 125.0 km (77.7 mi)
- Number of tracks: Single track
- Track gauge: 760 mm (2 ft 5 15/16 in) Bosnian gauge
- Minimum radius: 60 m (197 ft)
- Electrification: None
- Operating speed: 30–50 km/h (19–31 mph)
- Highest elevation: 1,267 m (4,157 ft)
- Maximum incline: 3.2%

The Septemvri–Dobrinishte narrow-gauge line (Bulgarian: теснолинейка Септември – Добринище, tesnolineyka Septemvri–Dobrinishte) is the only operating 760 mm (2 ft 5 15/16 in) narrow-gauge line in Bulgaria. It is operated by Bulgarian State Railways (BDŽ). The line is actively used with four passenger trains running the length of the line in each direction per day. The journey takes five hours through the valleys and gorges between the mountain ranges of Rila, Pirin and Rhodopes.

The route leads from Septemvri on the mainline Sofia–Ihtiman–Plovdiv to Dobrinishte, passing towns of Velingrad, Yakoruda, Razlog, Bansko and Dobrinishte, linking the western part of the Upper Thracian Plain with the Western Rhodopes, Rila and Pirin mountains. Due to the characteristics of the route through the mountains, the narrow-gauge line Septemvri–Dobrinishte is also known as the Alpine railway in the Balkans. Avramovo station, situated at 1267 meters above the sea, is the highest station in the Balkans.

Thanks to the proposal for the construction of the railway and the continuing efforts of Stoyan Maltchankoff (1875–1920), a Member of Parliament from the region of Nevrokop, a teacher and a former voivode against the Ottoman empire, a special law about the narrow-gauge railway Sarambey (Septemvri) – Nevrokop (Gotse Delchev) was also adopted in three readings in May 1920 i.e. Law on Construction of the Sarambey–Ladzhene to Nevrokop Narrow Gauge Railway with Branches for the Village of Eli Dere – Tatar Pazardzhik, the Village of Batak and the Chehlyovo State Forest. Several other laws for the development of the Bulgarian railways were adopted the same year, such as the Law for Settling the Situation of the Railway Lines Built for Military Needs During the European War, the Law for the Local and Industrial Railways, etc.

The railway was built in several stages between 1921 and 1945 with total length of 125 km (78 miles) but it reaches only until the town of Dobrinishte. During the communism it was never continued until the town of Nevrokop (Gotse Delchev railway station) as originally planned. The Varvara railway station – Lyahovo railway stop – Pazardzhik branch line, which was closed in 2002, was 16.6 km (10.3 miles) long.

The narrow-gauge railway Sarambey–Nevrokop is very often confused with the TransRhodope narrow-gauge railway which had been proposed in 1913 when Bulgaria had gotten access to the Aegean Sea (which it had later lost) and it was never built despite decades of requests of the local population.

== History ==
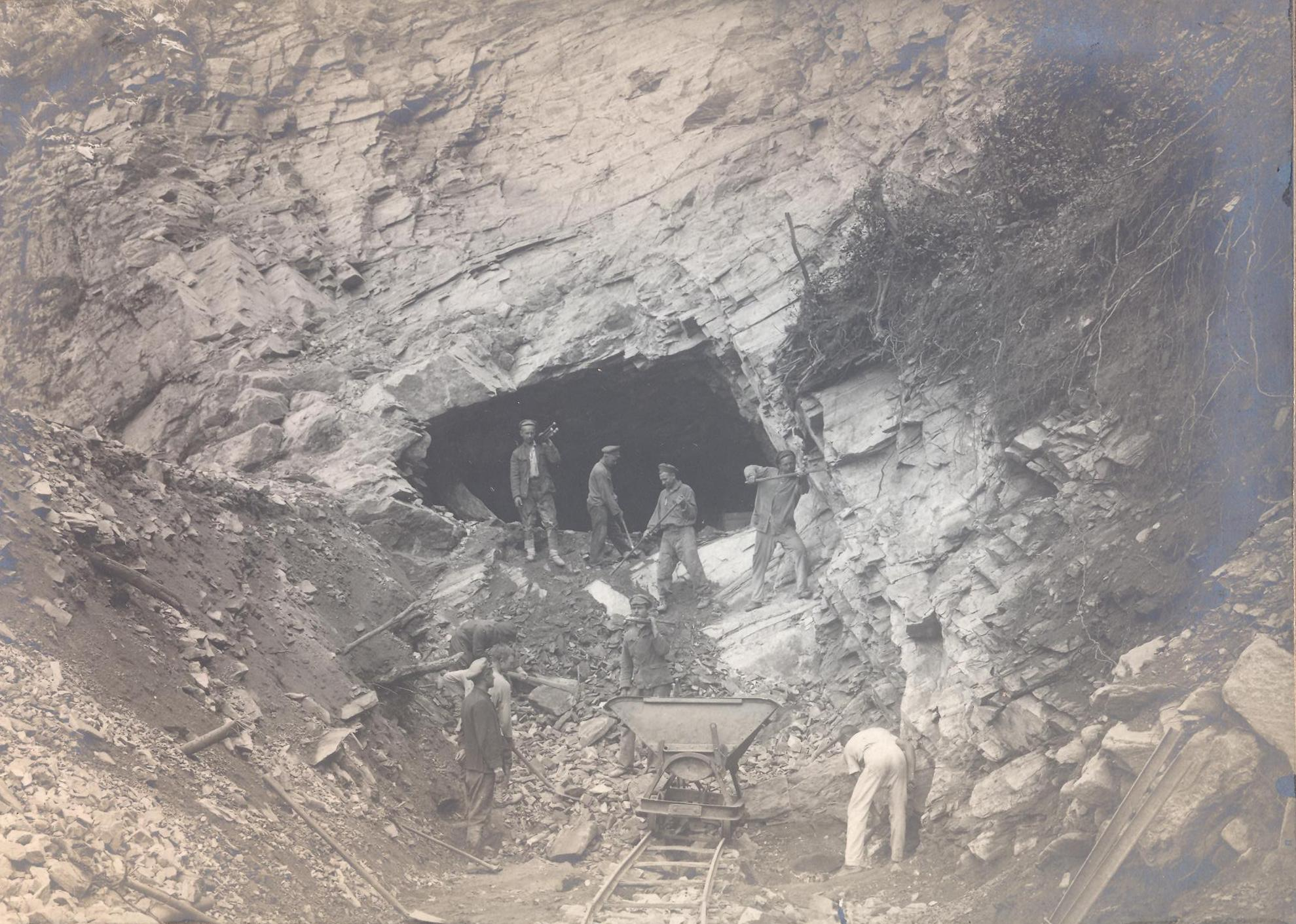
Septemvri–Dobrinishte narrow-gauge line building, km 13+500, 1920s

At the beginning of the 20th century, the Bulgarian railways developed at a fast pace but there was an urgent need for more railway lines, the lack of which was felt acutely during the Balkan Wars and the First World War. Many normal and narrow-gauge lines had been built and proposals had been made for the construction of others for economic (exploitation of forests, natural resources, mines, etc.) and for military purposes.

Stoyan Maltchankoff proposes the construction of the narrow-gauge line Sarambey (September) - Nevrokop (Gotse Delchev) for the development of the poor region of Nevrokop which had become part of the Kingdom of Bulgaria after the wars. In an extensive article from February 2, 1920, in Mir newspaper (the People's Party newspaper), he had explained in details the difficult situation in the region of Nevrokop and the lack of railway infrastructure and communications, which hindered trade and efficient use of the rich natural resources in the region such as the virgin coniferous forests on the western slopes of the Rhodopes and on the eastern slopes of Pirin, coal, etc. He had proposed: "...After all the above, the Council of Ministers (resp. Of Minister Turlakov) is to do the following in order to revive the region of Nevrokop and to feel that it is also part of Mother Bulgaria: 1. The necessary state funds should be allocated for the repair of the roads and their bridges which connect the town of Nevrokop with Simitli and Sarambey stations so that trucks and cars can drive on them, 2. A capable engineer based in Nevrokop should be appointed; 3. A law should be passed in the National Assembly during its session to connect the town of Nevrokop with Simitli station or Sarambey station with a 75-centimeter narrow-gauge railway which in both cases will pass through the towns of Bansko and Mehomiya, the picturesque Razlog Valley (district) extremely rich also in pine forests. The line will pass along the Mesta river without any tunnel and with an extremely small slope. 4. Daily allowance of 10 to 20 BGN should be provided for the public servants and employees especially for those from old Bulgaria in the region of Strumica (resp. in the region of Nevrokop) in order to attract in this way enough and capable officials from old Bulgaria, both for the court and for other state institutions. Nowhere in the kingdom do officials live as sparingly as in Nevrokop. Minister Turlakoff who visited the town of Nevrokop on the eve of the legislative elections has seen and we believe he is convinced of the reality of all the above. The vigilant people at Nevrokop have high hopes".

After the Law on Construction of the Sarambey-Ladzhene to Nevrokop Narrow Gauge Railway with Branches for the Village of Eli Dere - Tatar Pazardzhik, the Village of Batak and the Chehlyovo State Forest was adopted in 1920, the construction started in 1921. In the hard years after the war, the progress was poor, with work done primarily by hand. The track reached Ladzhene in 1926, and the section opened on Aug 1, 1926 with three trains per week in each direction. The next short section to Chepino (now Velingrad south) was completed on June 3, 1927.

When Sarambey became the starting point of the line, the population of Pazardzhik feared their town would be away from the traffic and requested a branch of the new railway, which was completed and opened on Oct 27, 1928. This path was chosen to be the main and the railway became Pazardzhik - Chepino with a branch from Varvara - Pazardzhik - Sarambey. The section remained a branch until its closing in 2002, when the track to Pazardzhik was removed.

Construction of the hardest section, Chepino–Yakoruda continued up to 1937, when on 12th Dec it was opened for temporary service. The final opening was Jul 30, 1939, together with the section Yakoruda–Belitsa.

The final sections Belitsa–Bansko and Bansko–Dobrinishte were opened on Mar 3, 1943 and Dec 9, 1945 respectively. The original plan of the law to continue the track to Gotse Delchev was never realised.

== Route description ==
=== Septemvri–Velingrad ===
This first part is 39 km long. It starts at Septemvri, where it meets the standard-gauge railway line Sofia–Plovdiv. After almost straight 6 km long section in the plain, the route reaches station Varvara, the former junction with the removed branch to Pazardzhik. Then the route passes the river Chepinska reka (also known as Elidere) and the road to Velingrad onto a steel bridge and continues on the left (eastern) bank of the river. As a part of the road widening work, some time between 2013 and 2016 the bridge was replaced with a new one.

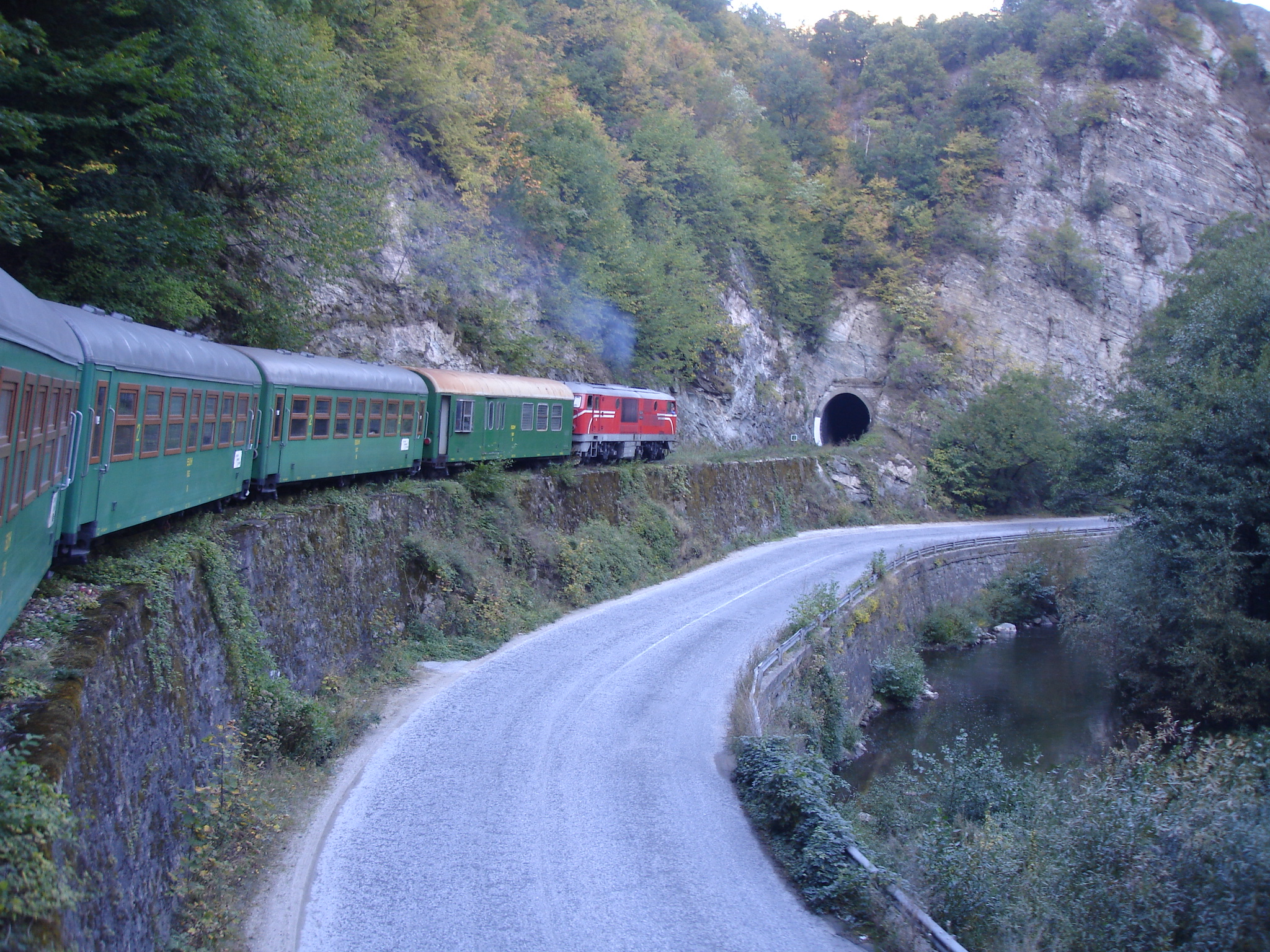
Approaching tunnel Nr 2

Along the gorge, the line passes Marko Nikolov (ex Mineral baths), Tsepina (ex Dorkovo) stops, the river again and the road at manually operated level crossing, to reach station Dolene, where it continues in the opposite direction on the other side of the valley, climbing 246 m level displacement to drainage divide Chukata and station Kostandovo ( 801 m AMSL) in 10.9 km. Here is the maximum slope of the route at 32 ‰. After passing this station, the route descends to Velingrad valley.

In the beginning there are also stops Milevi skali at km 17.5 between Tsepina and Dolene and Dryanov dol between Dolene and Kostandovo. In the period of heavy traffic in 60s and 70s, Dryanov dol is extended with passing loop and becomes a station, but then it is completely closed, together with Milevi skali. Tsepina also had been station with passing loop and sidings, removed in 2003.

All 10 tunnels on this part of the railway are between Marko Nikolov and Dolene. In April 1928 as a result of the Chirpan earthquake (M6.8), a huge amount of rocks collapses over the track at km 11.7. A new tunnel Nr 2 is constructed to avoid the small radius curves of the temporary track around the collapse. The abandoned old tunnel is still existing next to the new one. It is visible from the road, but not from the train. The open track between tunnels Nr 3, 4, 5, 6, 7, 8 is now covered to prevent another rock collapses on the route.

=== Velingrad–Yakoruda ===
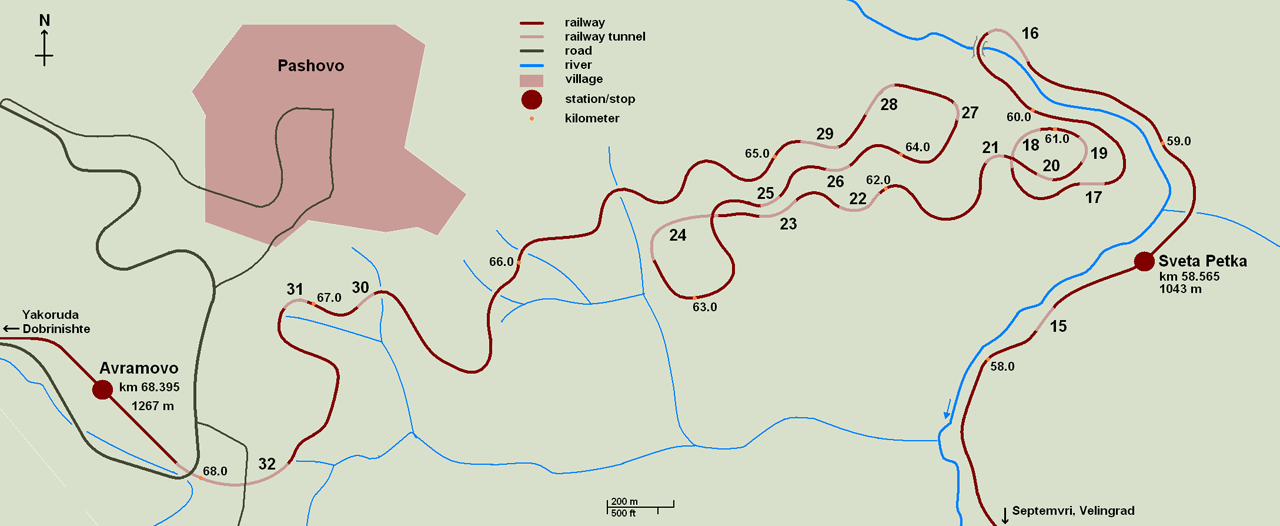
Sveta Petka–Avramovo route map

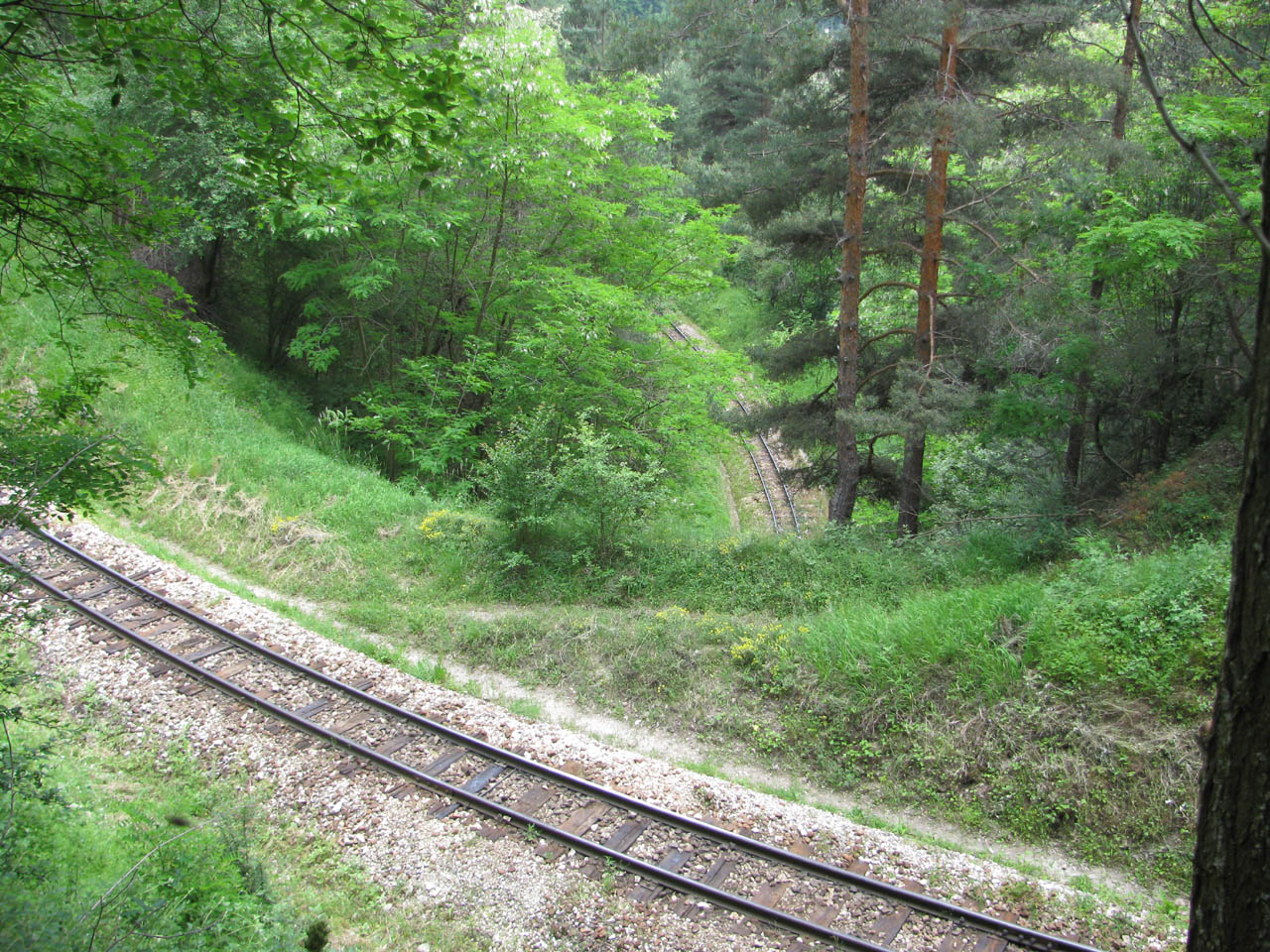
The track passes over itself at the first spiral.

This is the hardest section of Septemvri–Dobrinishte railway. It is 45 km long and all four spirals, 25 remaining tunnels and the highest railway station on the Balkans are here. Beginning from Velingrad, through Velingrad south stop, the line starts to climb along the right side of river Ablanitsa, heading Ostrets stop and station Cvetino. A few kilometers after Cvetino, the route turns to the right through the valley of the small river Lyuta reka, reaching the former station, now minor stop Sveta Petka.

There the route enters the Avramovo Saddle between the Rhodope Mountains and Rila and starts climbing 224 m in 9.8 km distance to station Avramovo, which is the highest railway station on the Balkans at 1267 m above sea level. Just after Tunnel Nr 16, the track passes a stone arch bridge over the river and begins its four-level way on the north side of the valley through 16 tunnels, two spirals and one 180° turn. The line passes under itself two times in tunnels Nr 18 and 24. In this section, the train changes its traveling direction 6 times. The average incline is 30 ‰. The climbing ends at station Avramovo just after tunnel Nr 32, which is the longest one – 315 m.

This highest point is followed by steep and long descent in the valley of river Dreshtenets. After the Smolevo stop, the line turns at the third spiral, passing under itself in tunnel Nr 34. Just after the spiral, the route overpasses the river and the road on a stone arch viaduct, followed by the fourth spiral around a natural hill, where is the last tunnel Nr 35. Reaching Cherna Mesta stop, the track continues to Yakoruda through the valley of river Mesta. Since 2020 there is a new stop Yakoruda mineral baths.

Sveta Petka and Cherna Mesta are former stations, which have had passing loops and sidings. Between Sveta Petka and Avramovo there is also a closed stop for the nearby village Pashovo.

=== Yakoruda–Dobrinishte ===
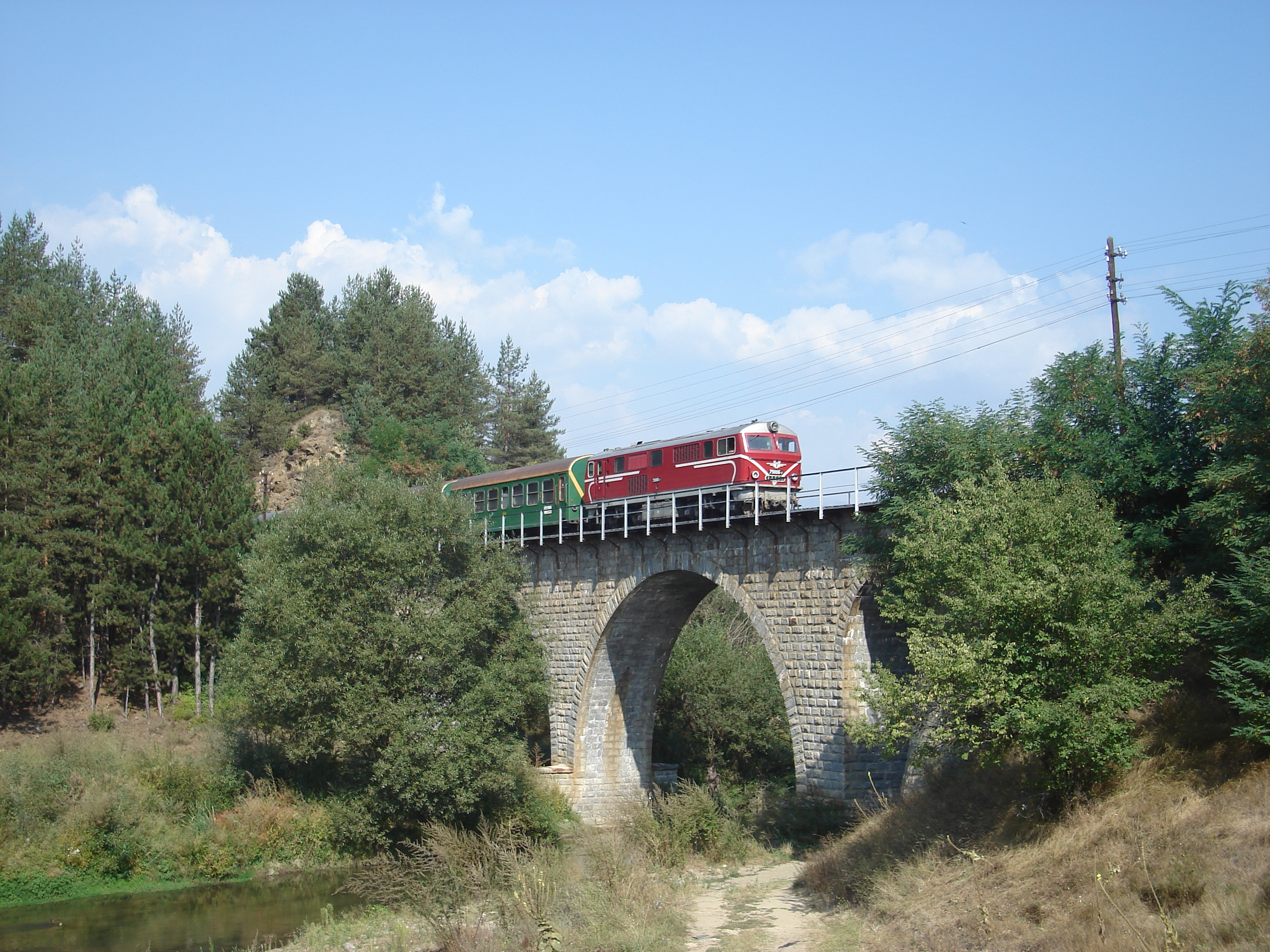
Passenger train heading Septemvri on the longest bridge near Guliyna banya

The last part of the railway has much better parameters, because most of the route is traced for standard-gauge railway, which had been planned to replace the narrow-gauge track in future. After stops Yurukovo and Dagonovo, the line passes station Belitsa and continues to General Kovachev stop, where it leaves the valley of river Mesta and heading Razlog through the valley of smaller river, named Iztok. In his end, the track passes the longest bridge over the river – 58 m long stone viaduct with four arches. It is followed by Guliyna banya stop and after this point the railway continues in the Razlog plain and reaches its final station Dobrinishte through Razlog and Bansko.

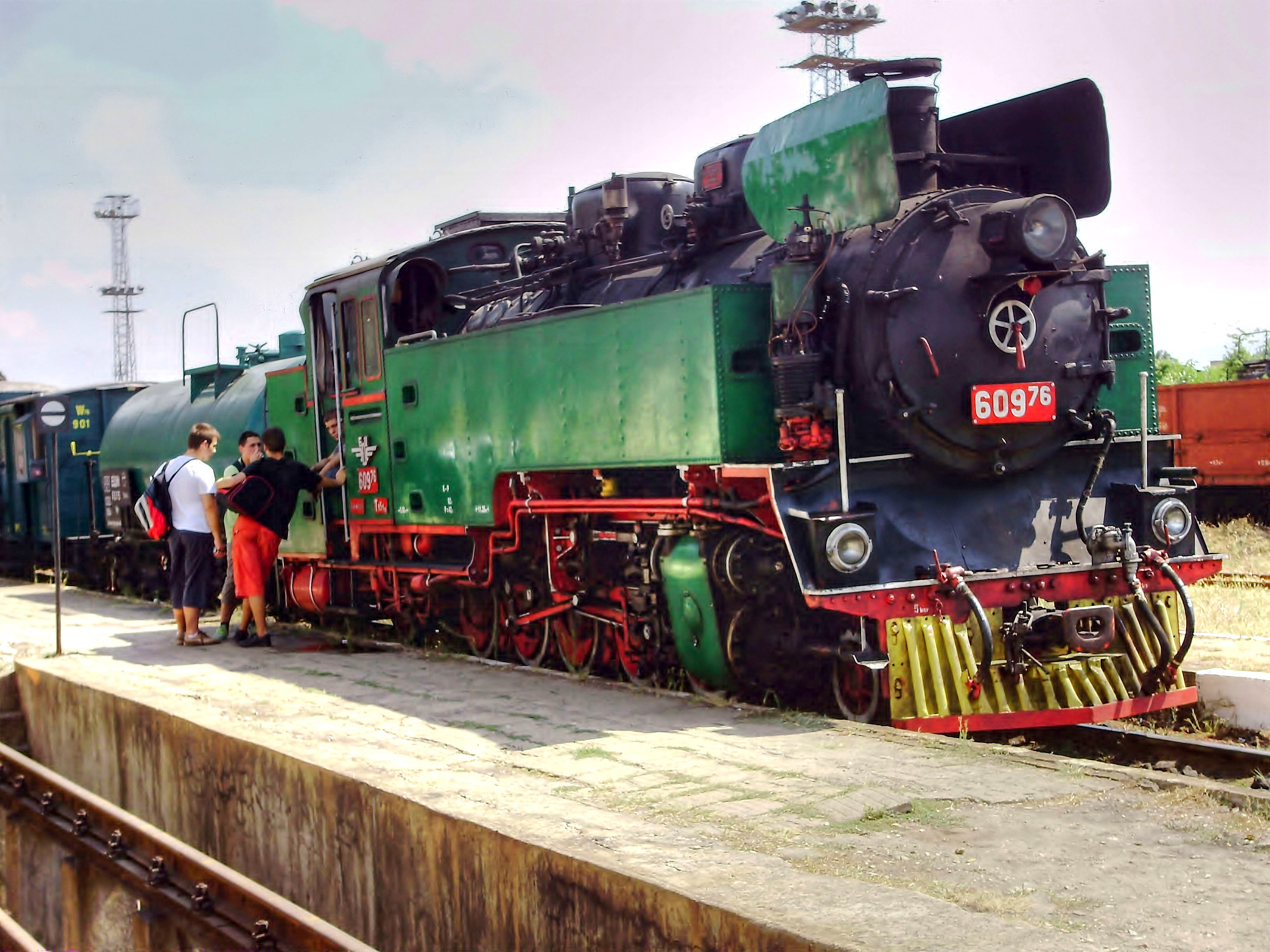
609^{76} at tourist train

In Razlog there had been a small branch, serving some industry near the town. It is source of the last freight traffic until 2003, when closed and removed.

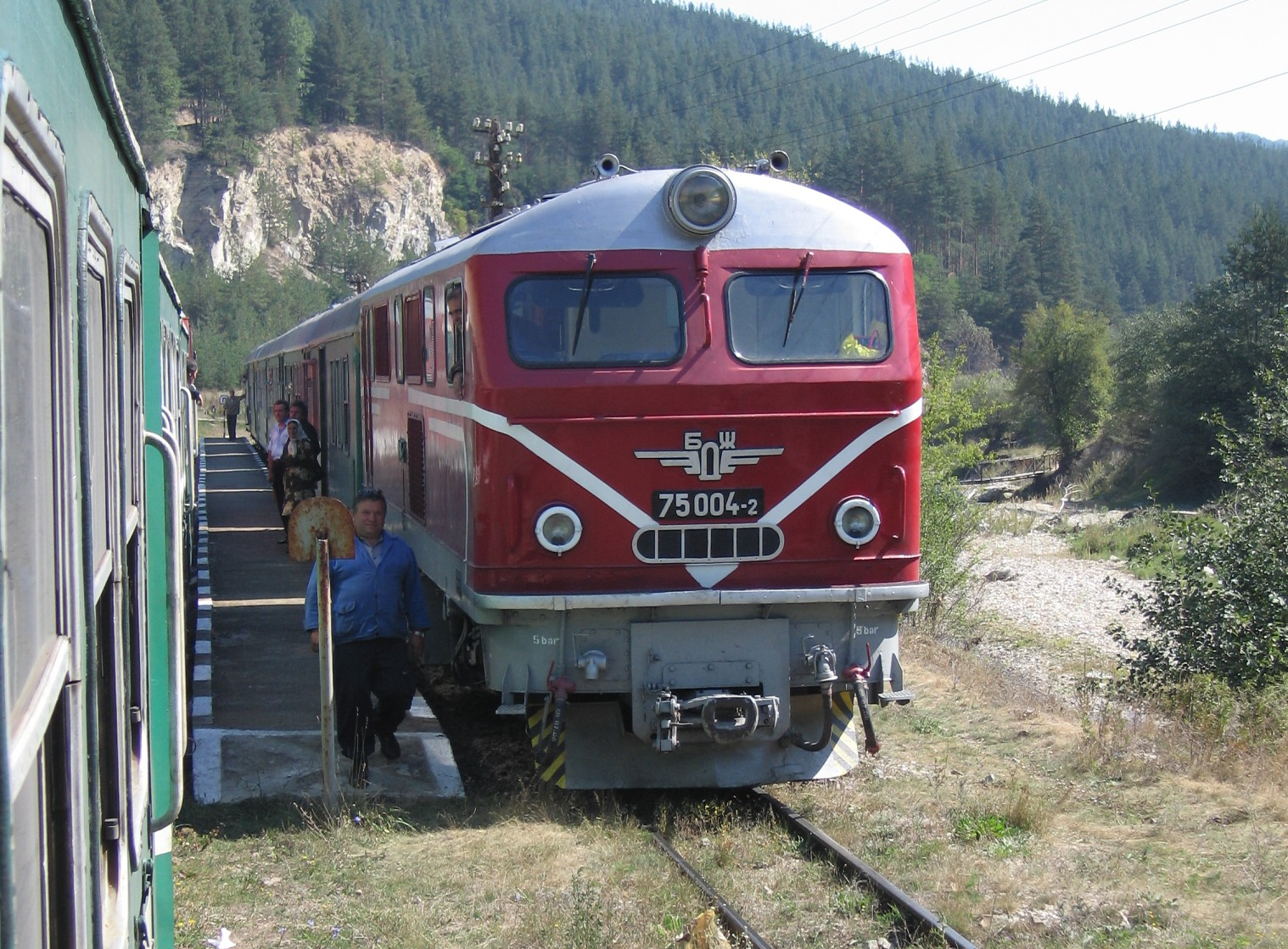
Diesel locomotive of the narrow-gauge railway

== Traffic and rolling stock ==
List of locomotives
Fleet no.	Delivery	Status
609^{76}	1949	in service
75 002	1966	out of service
75 004	1966	in service
75 005	1966	out of service
75 006	1966	in service
75 008	1966	in service
75 009	1966	out of service
77 002	1988	in service
77 005	1988	in service
77 008	1988	in service
77 009	1988	in service
Note: the missing numbers are scrapped or sold.

The first rolling stock was brought from the other narrow-gauge railway Cherven bryag–Oryahovo (now closed), which was already built in 1926. Operation of the section Sarambey - Ladzhene began with four small steam engines (0-6-2T, UIC class C1′ n2vPt) of the 1^{76} – 10^{76} series. They can haul 3–5 cars on the main slopes. In this period there were a pair of mixed trains and two pairs of freight trains per day. In 1928 four steam engines of the 500^{76} series (0-10-0T, E h2Gt) were delivered. In 1931 two more engines of the same class were delivered. The first five engines of the 600^{76} series (2-10-2T, 1′E1′ h2Gt) ware delivered in 1940 and the other 10 in 1949–1950. Three diesel railcars of class 81 were delivered from Ganz Works in 1941 and additional four of class 82 in 1952 for long-distance passenger trains.

In the 60s and 70s the traffic became too busy for the steam engines and railcars, so in 1965 and 1966 ten diesel engines were delivered from Henschel AG. They are working as class 75 and are still in service now. Most of the steam engines were transferred to the Cherven bryag–Oryahovo line. In these years there were more than 10 trains (passenger, freight and mixed) daily in each direction.

Ten engines of class 77 were delivered in 1988 from 23 August Works of Bucharest, Romania, but five of them were sold to RFIRT (now YCF), Argentina in 1996. Before this delivery, some engines class 76 also had been working on the Septemvri–Dobrinishte railway while the others were based on the Cherven bryag–Oryahovo railway.

Steam locomotive 609^{76} is the only preserved in working condition and used for tourist trains.

Since 2003 there is only passenger service with three trains per day in each direction. As of 2016, there are now four trains running the entire length of the line each day. The current plan can be found on the website of Bulgarian State Railways.

In 1982, Bulgarian industry ordered 10 narrow-gauge shunting diesels of Soviet locomotive class ТУ7 (TU7E) (BDŽ class 81) from the Russian Kambarka Engineering Works.

== Gallery ==
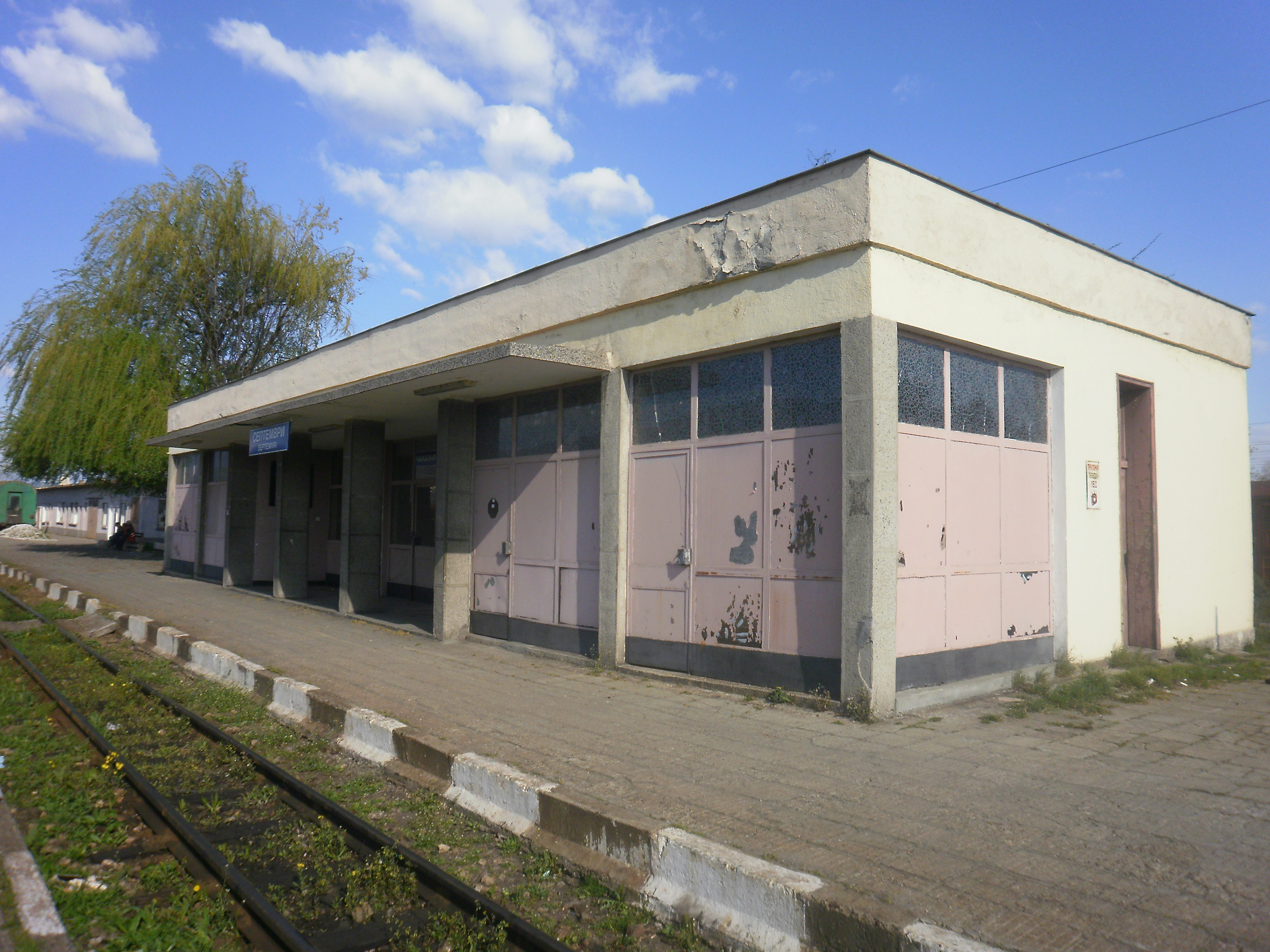
Septemvri station

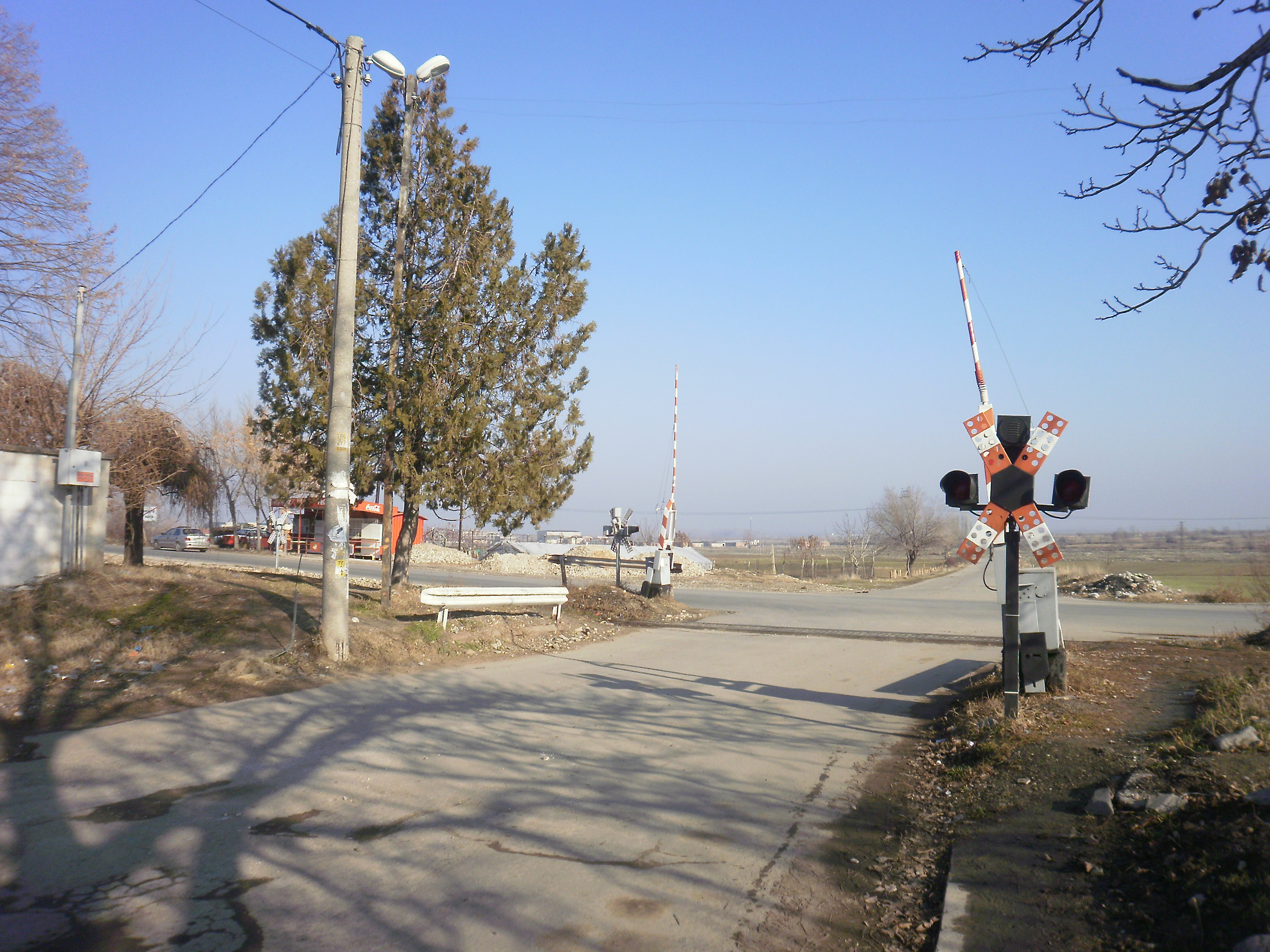
Pamporovo station

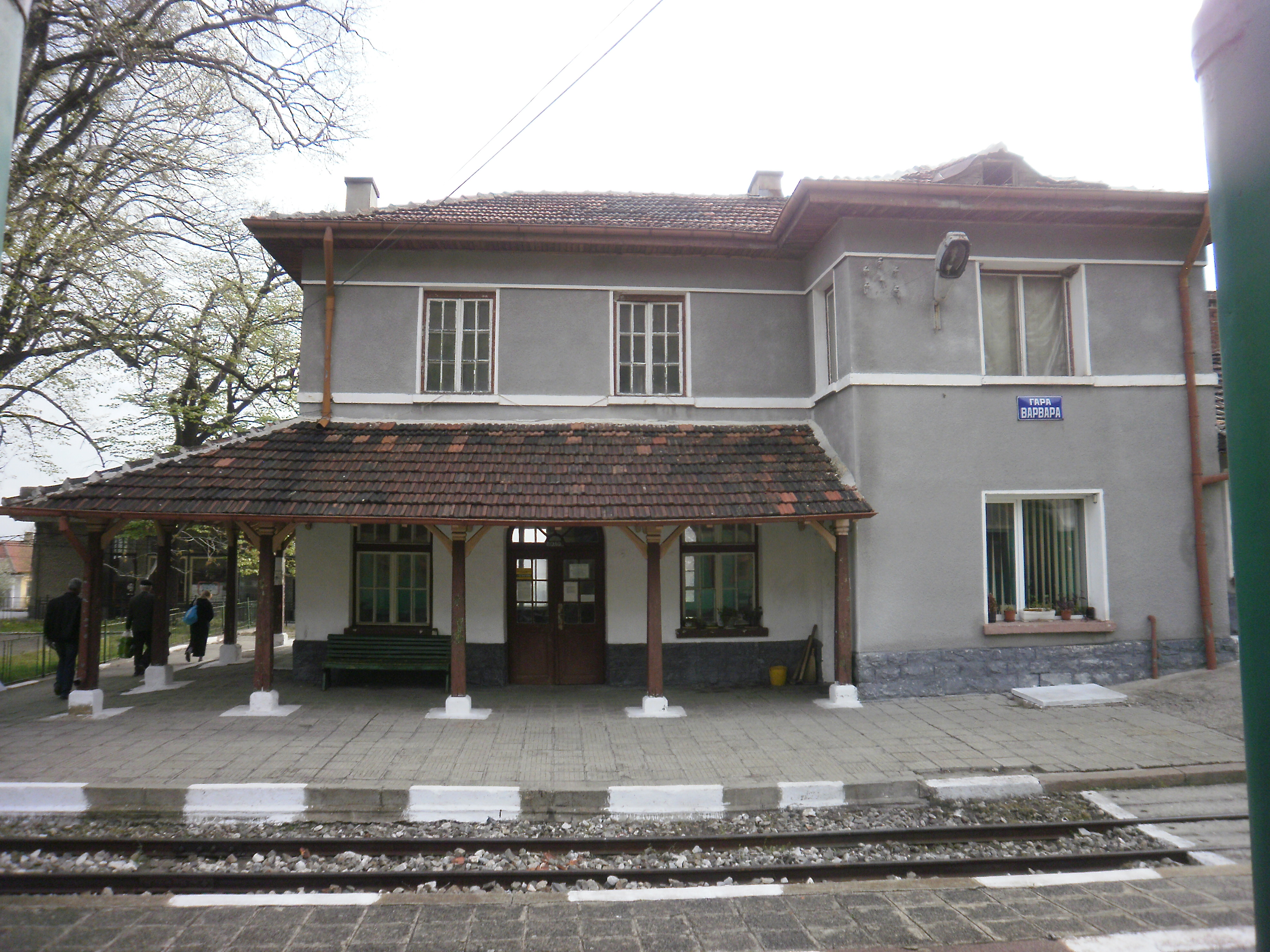
Varvara station

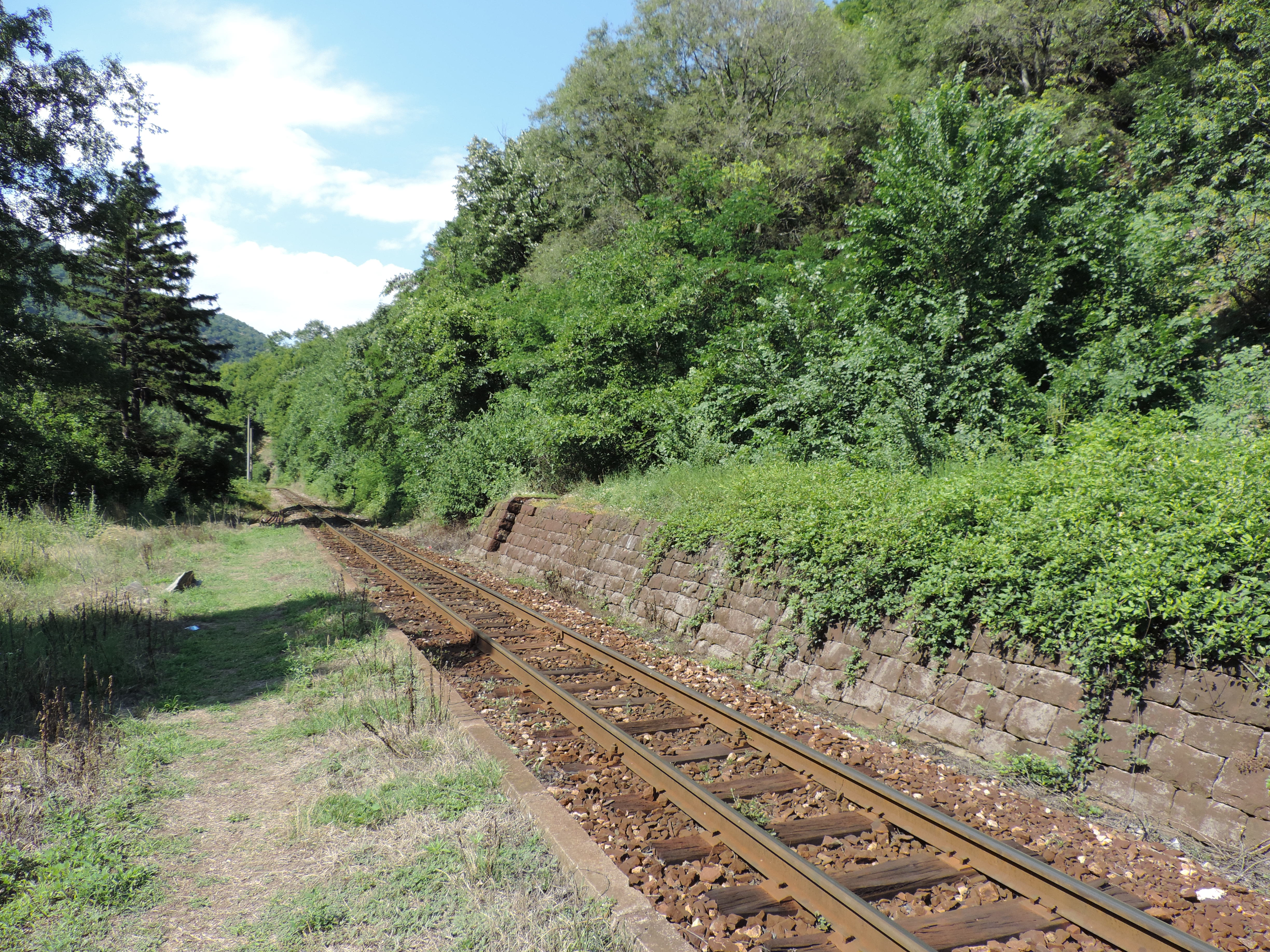
Marko Nikolov station

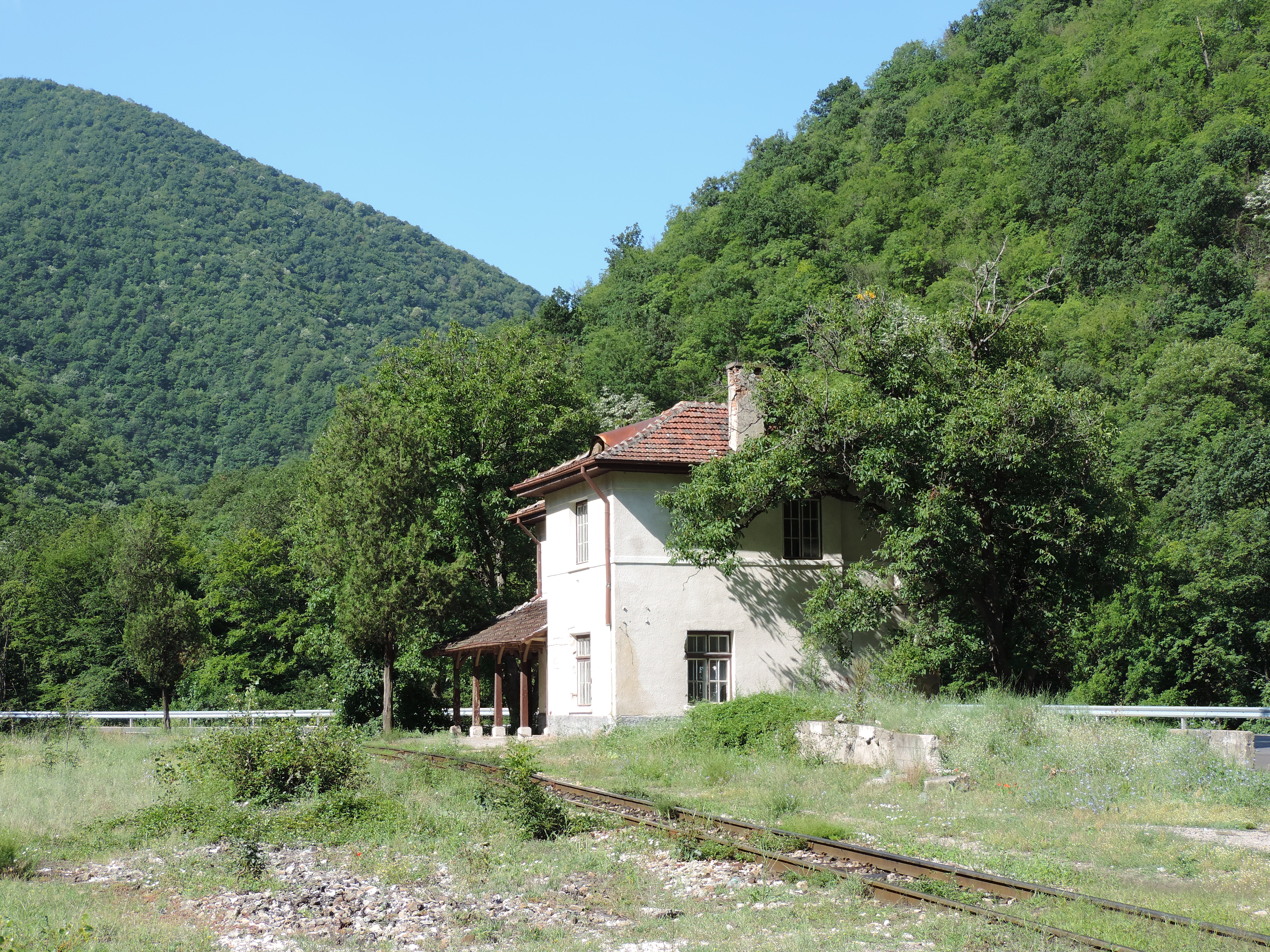
Tsepina station

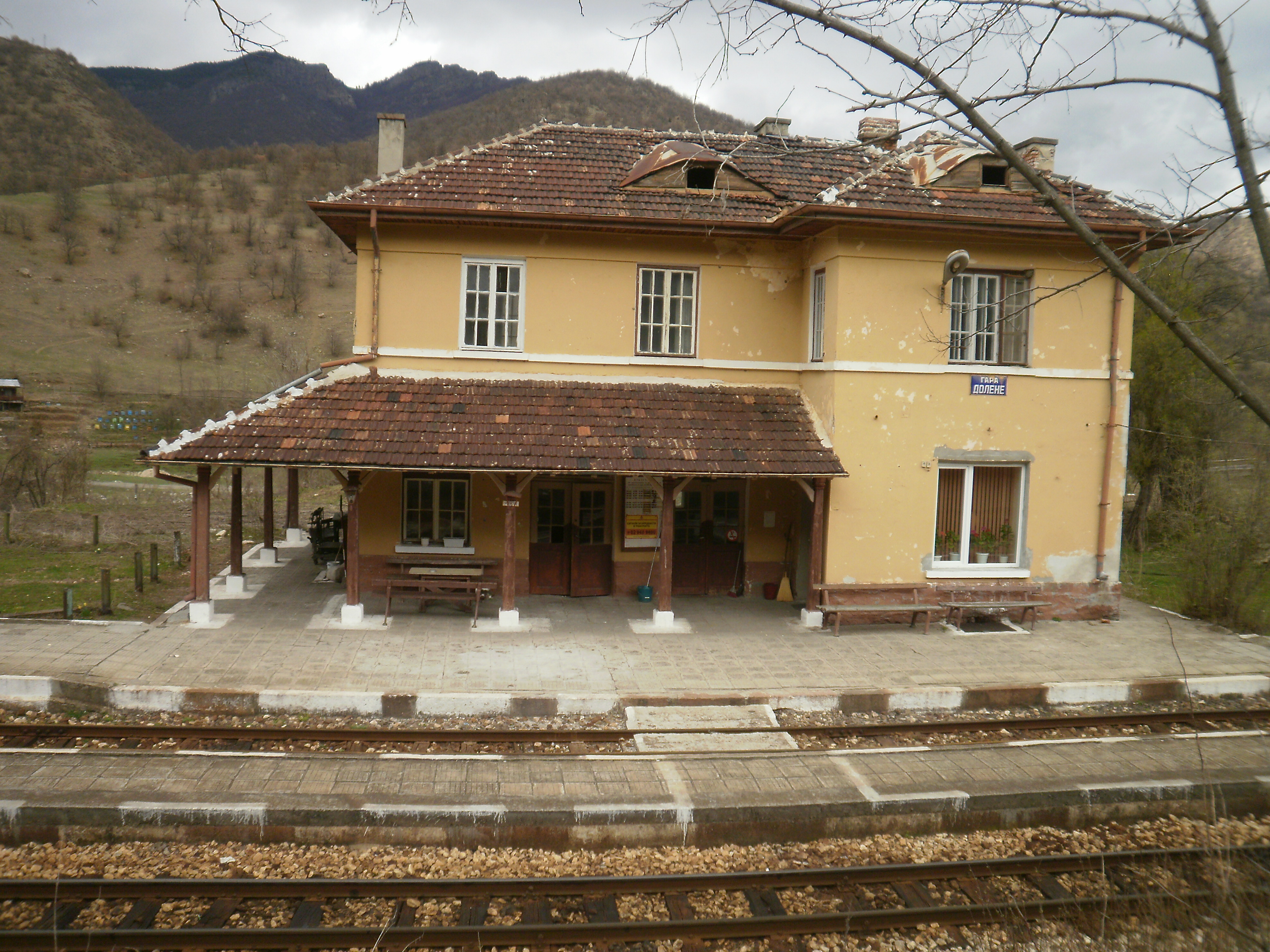
Dolene station

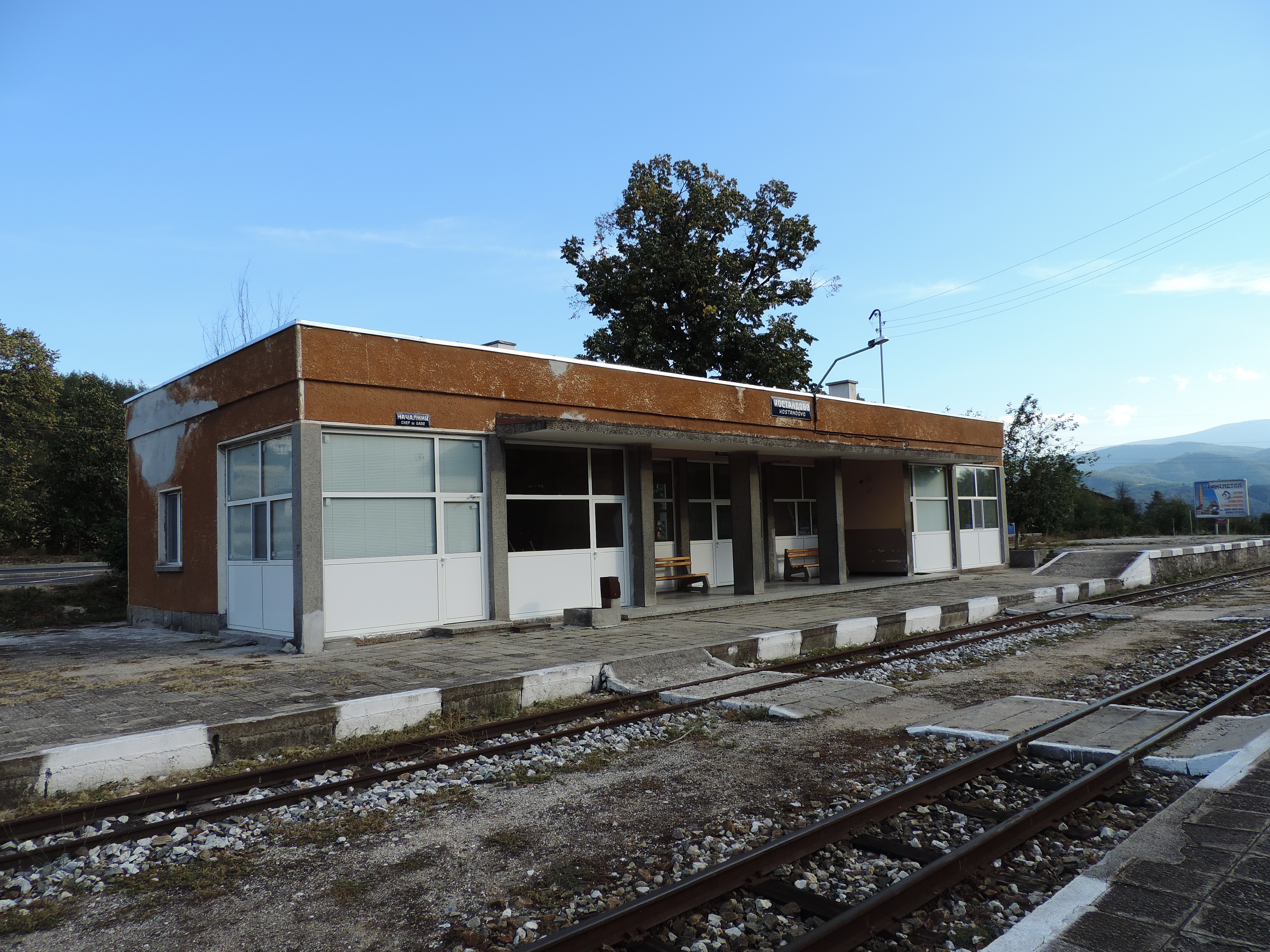
Kostandovo station

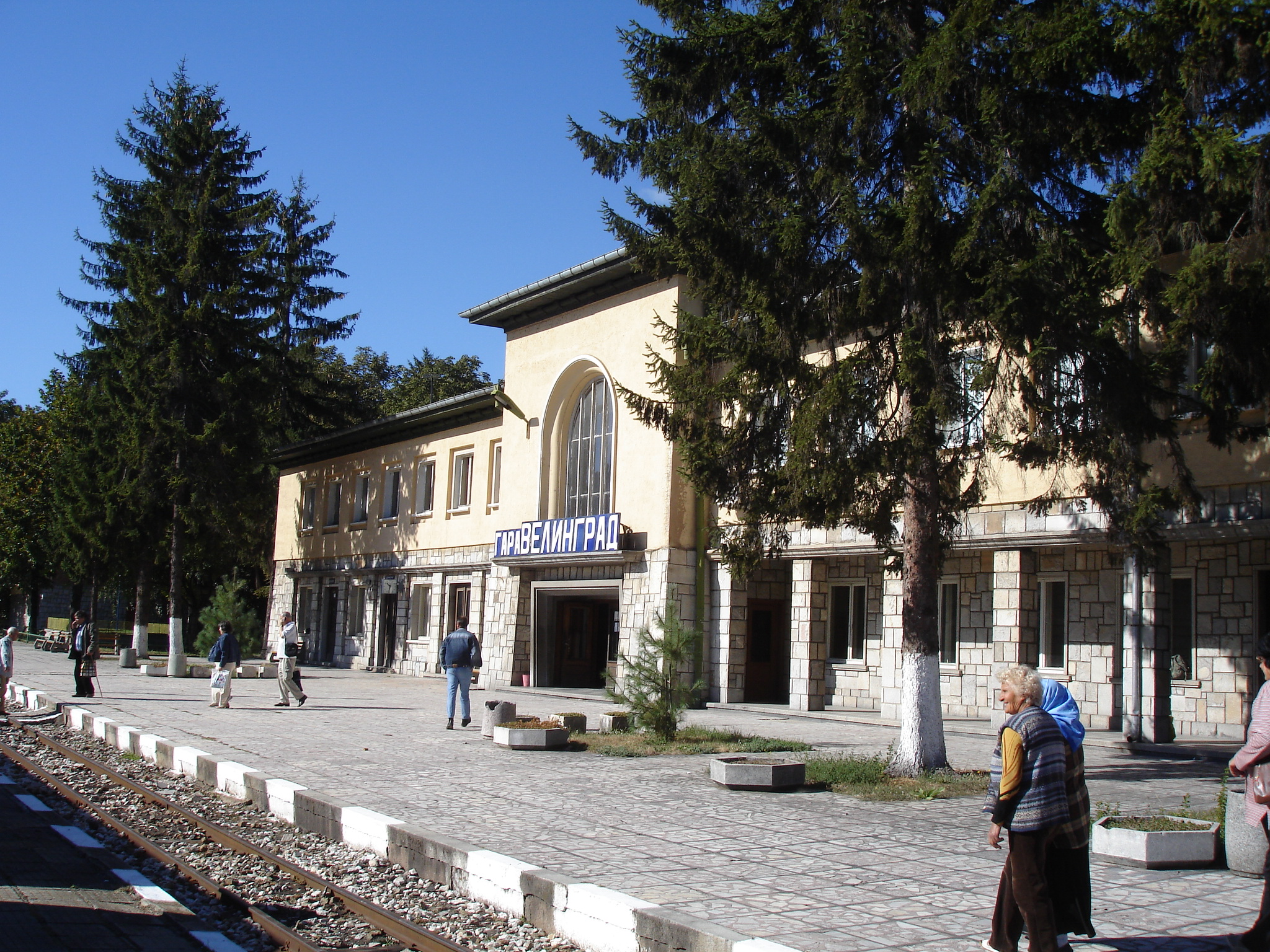
Velingrad station

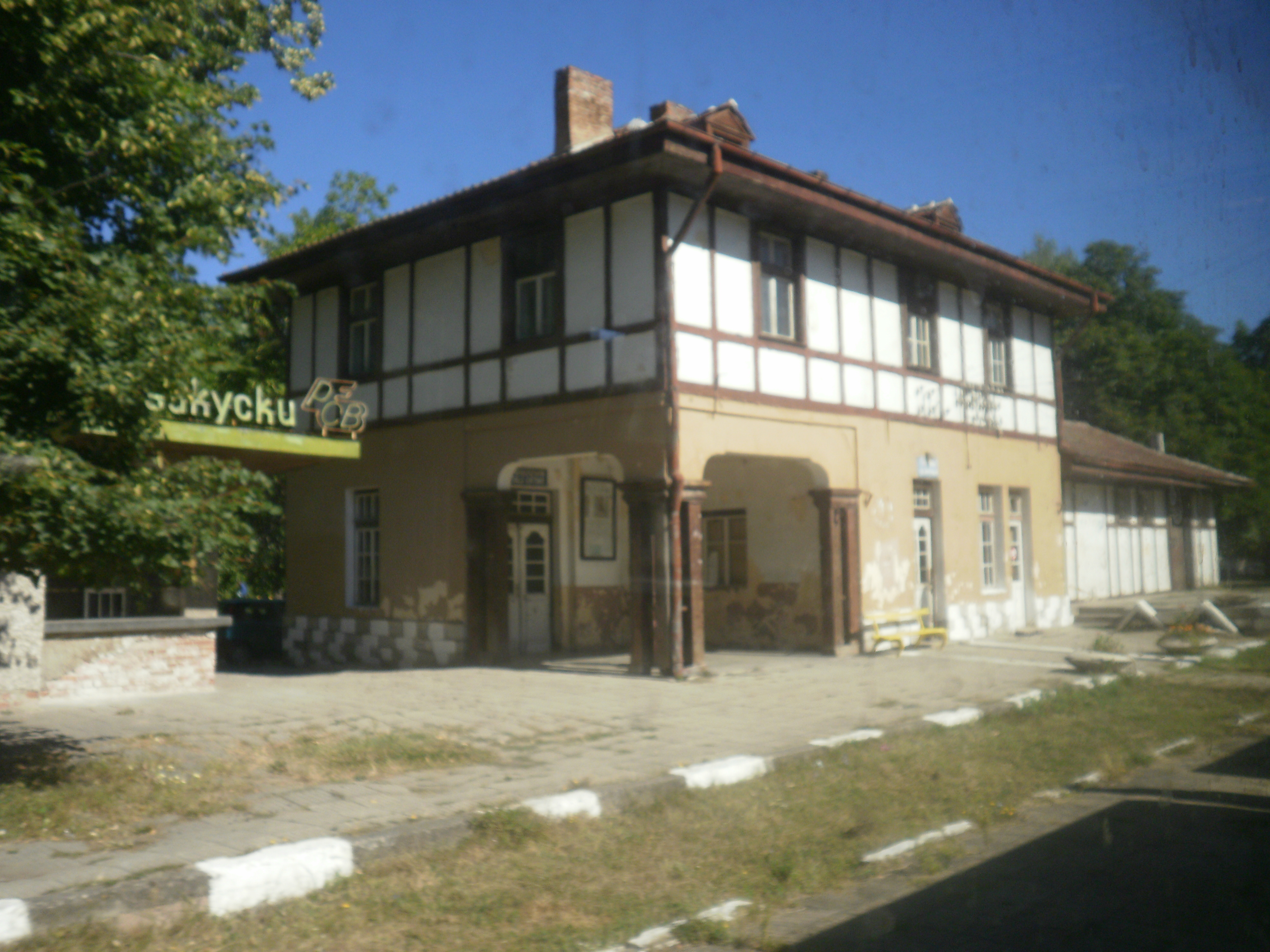
Velingrad-south station

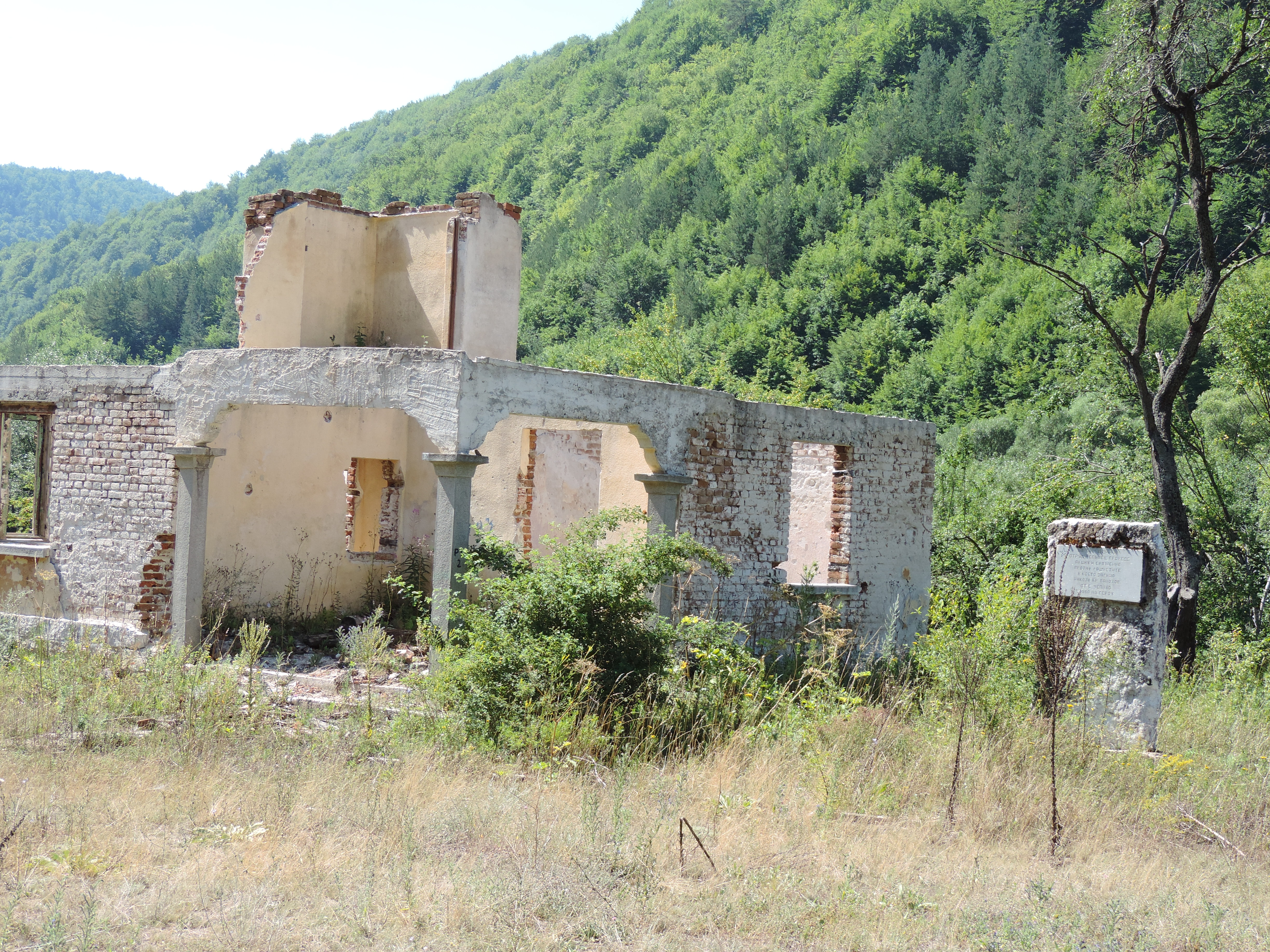
Ostrets station

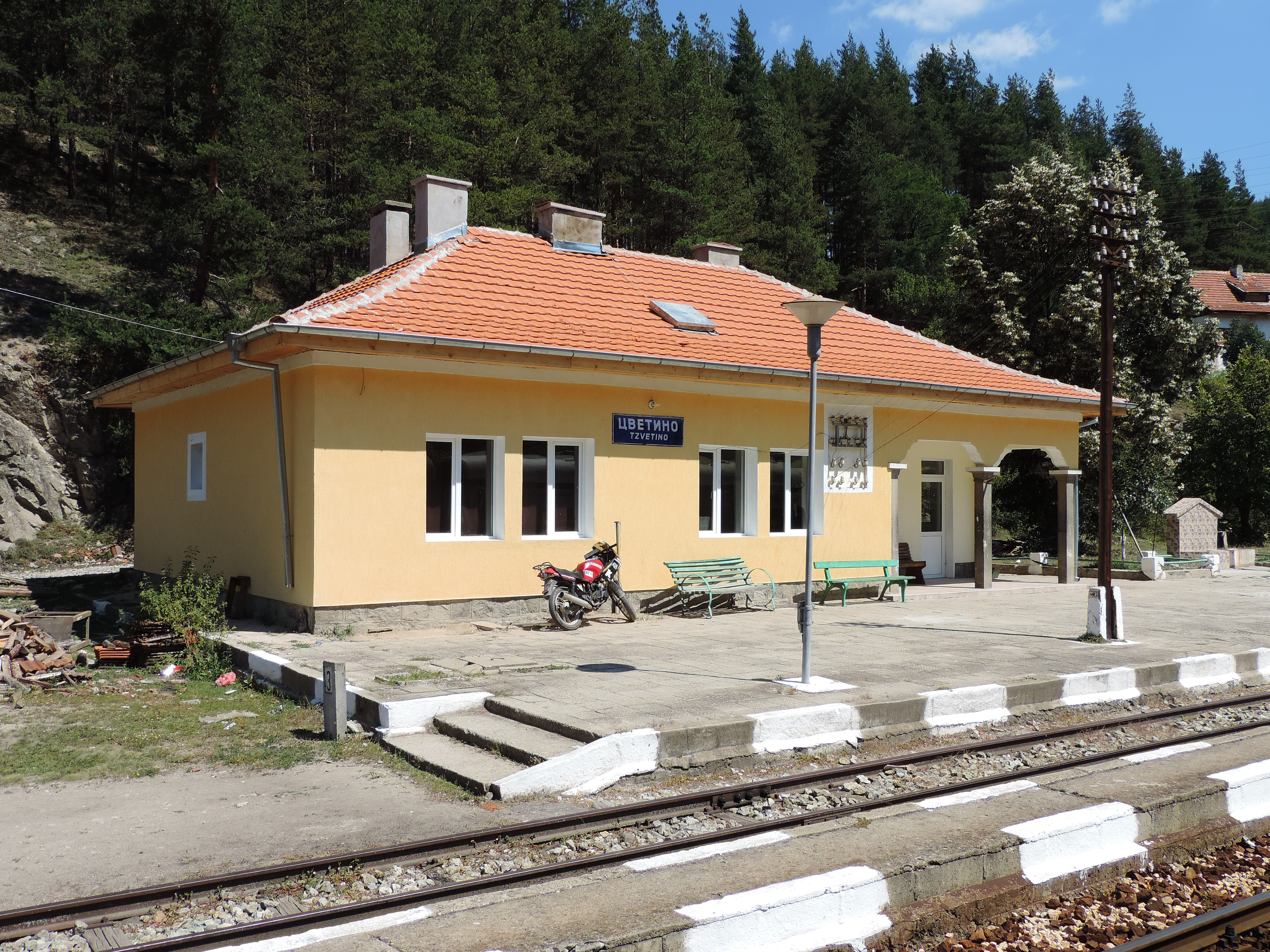
Tsvetino station

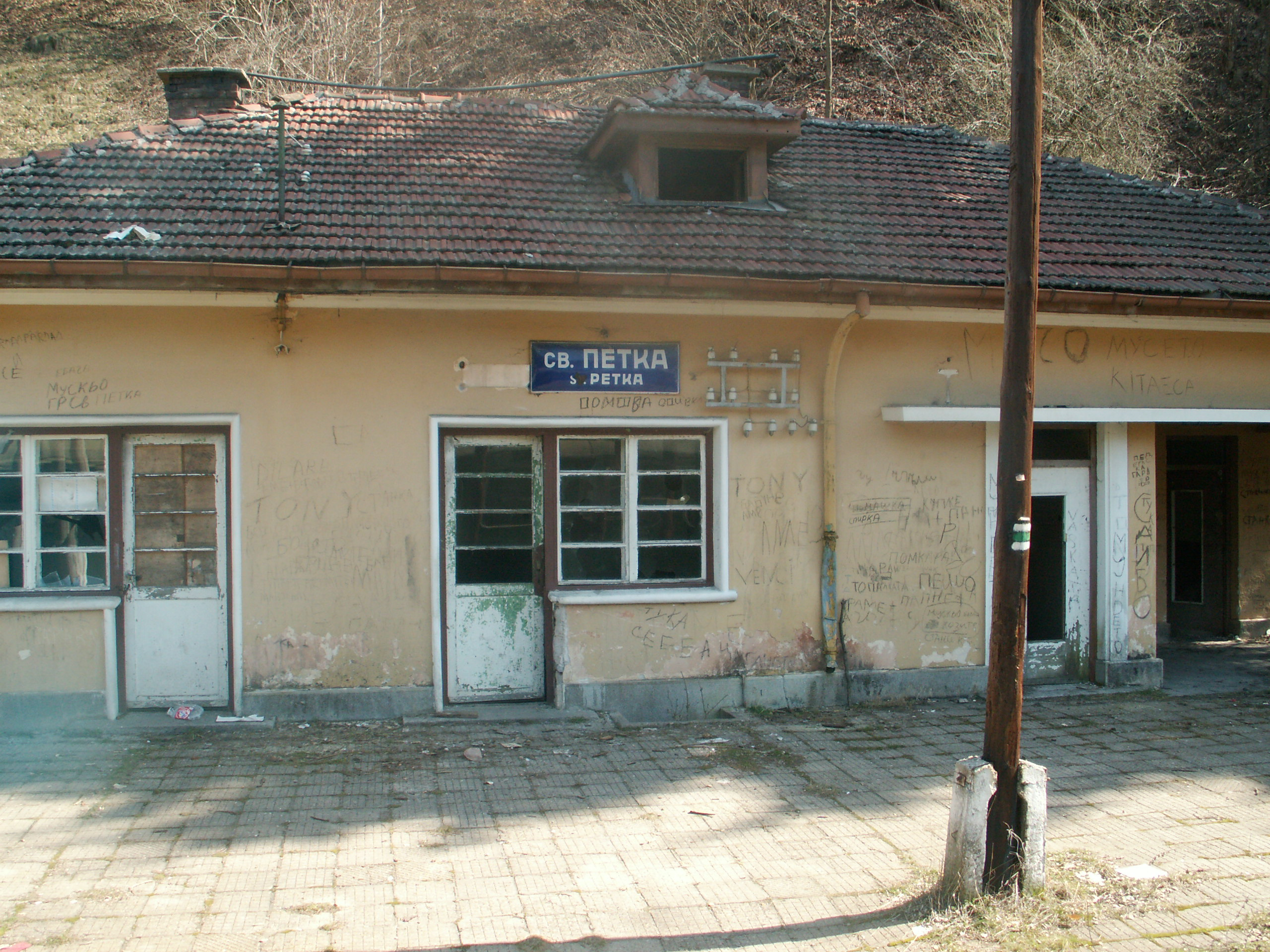
Sveta Petka station

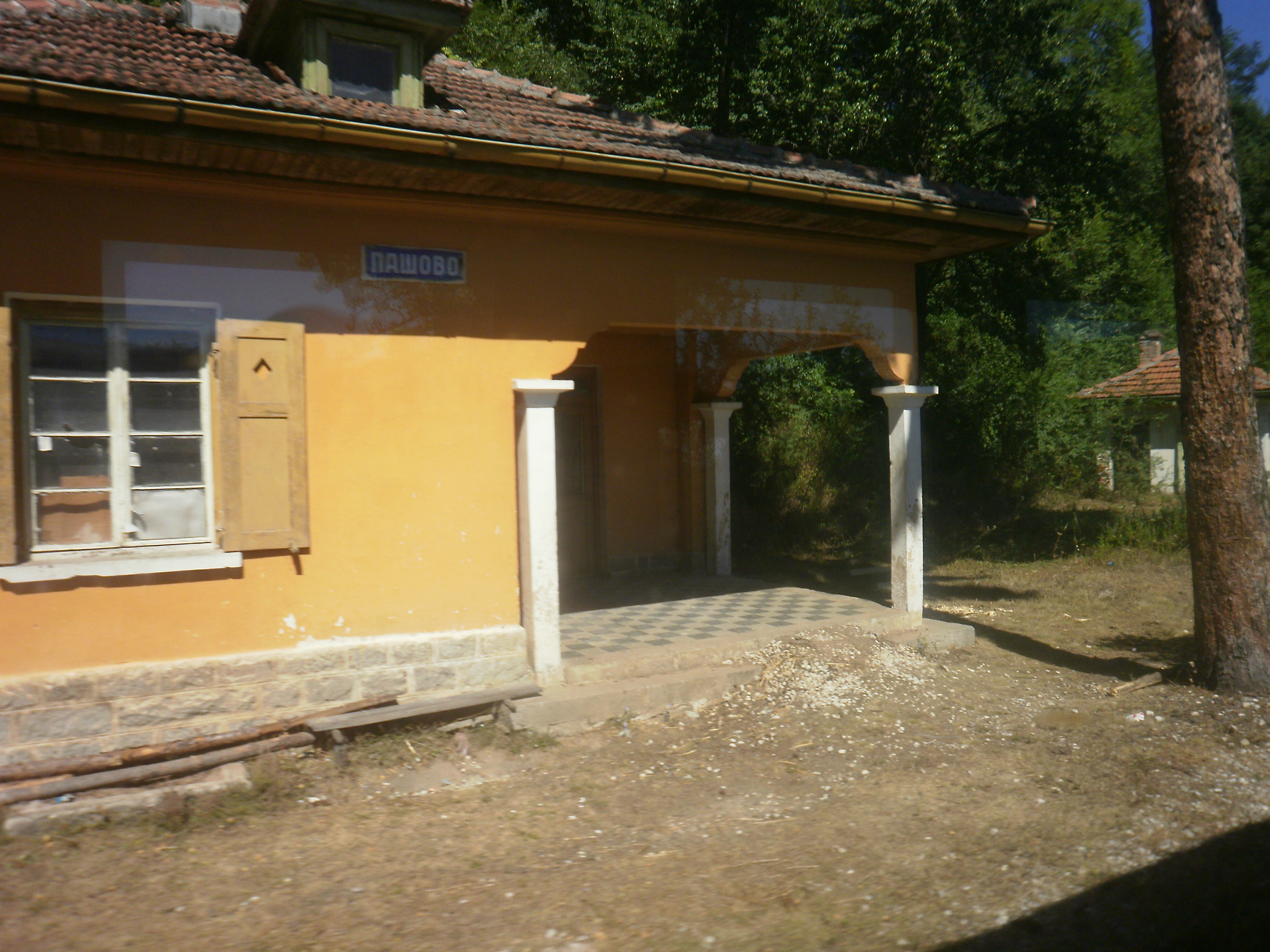
Pashovo station

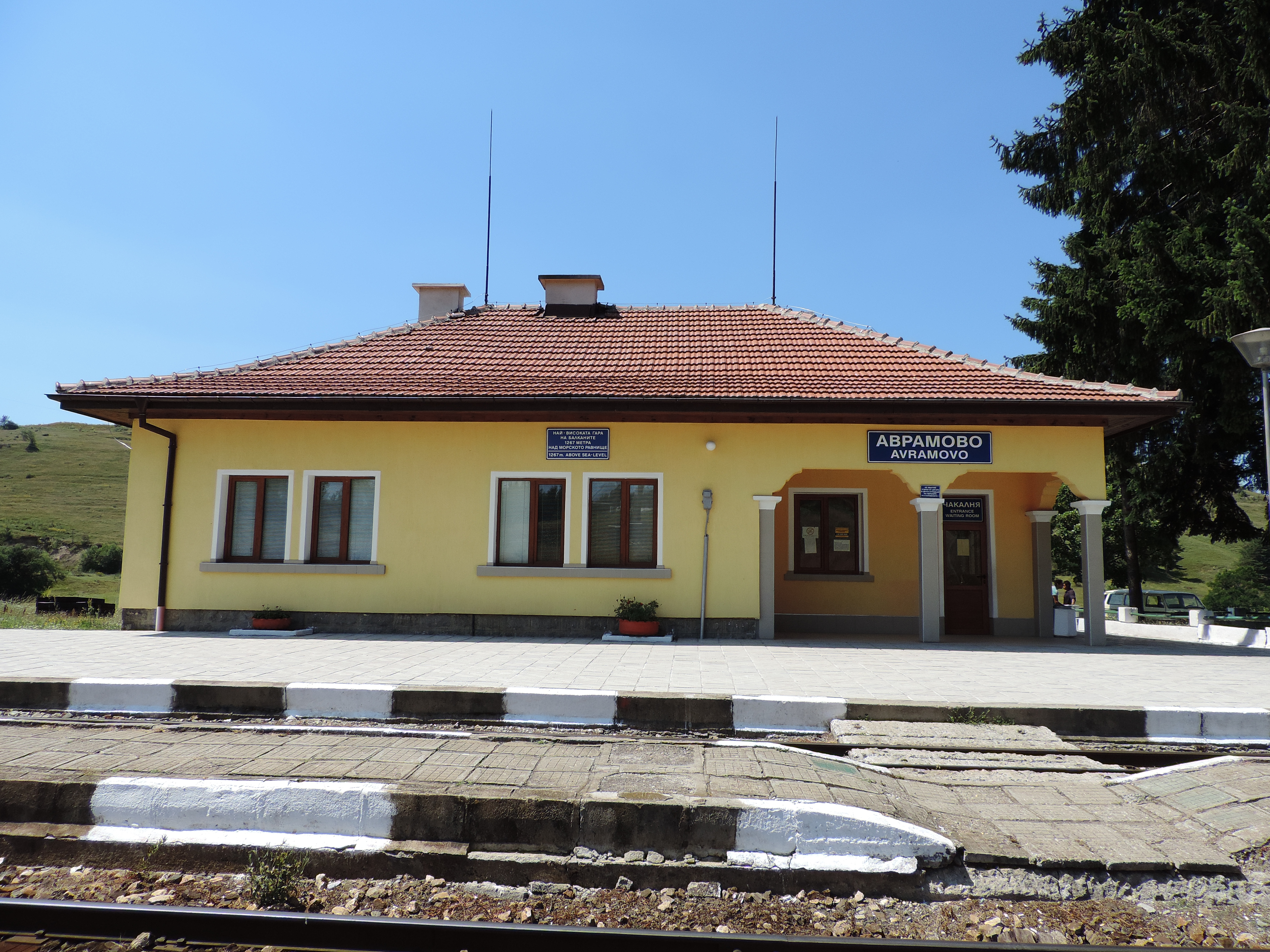
Avramovo station

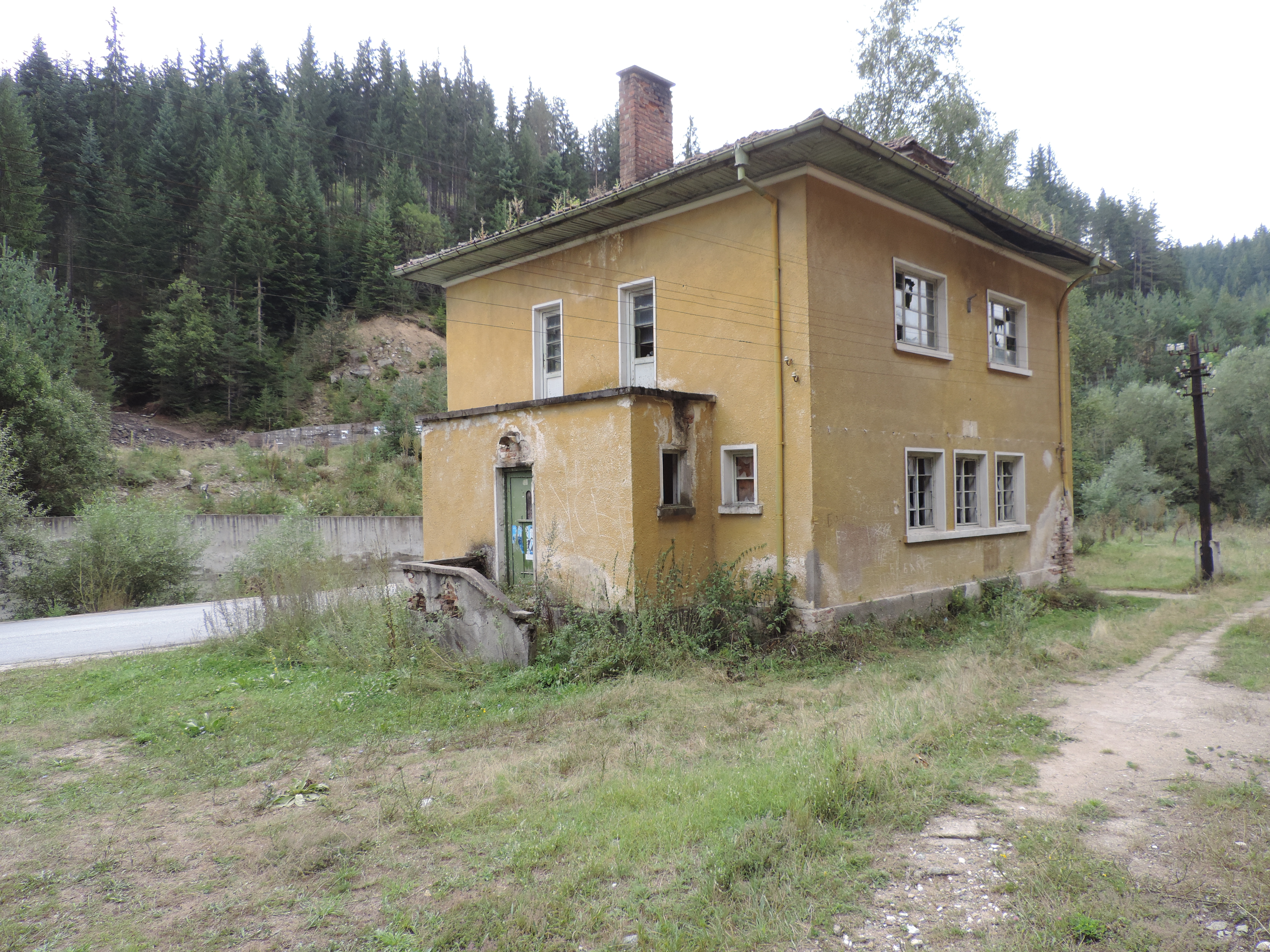
Smolevo station

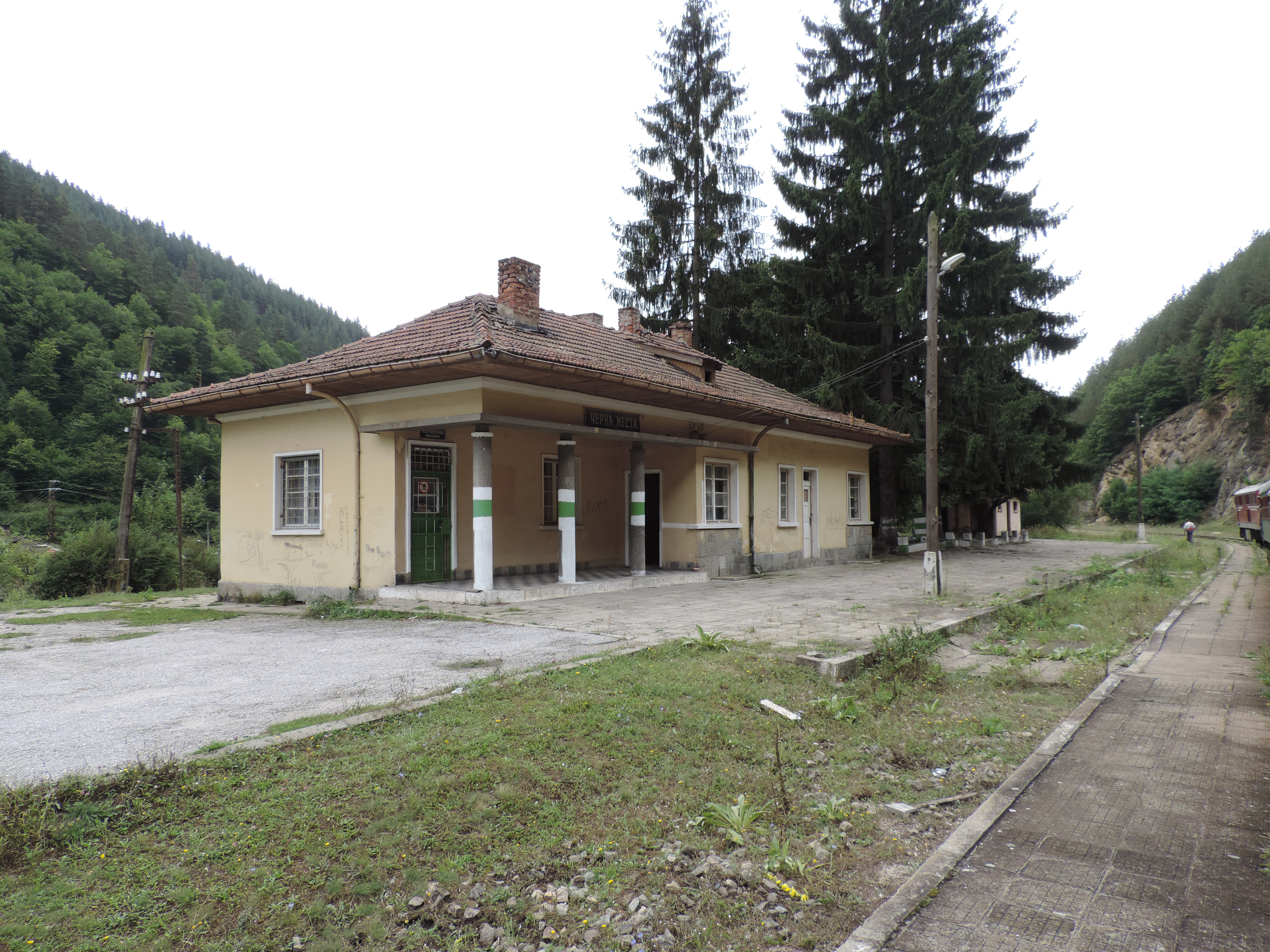
Cherna Mesta station

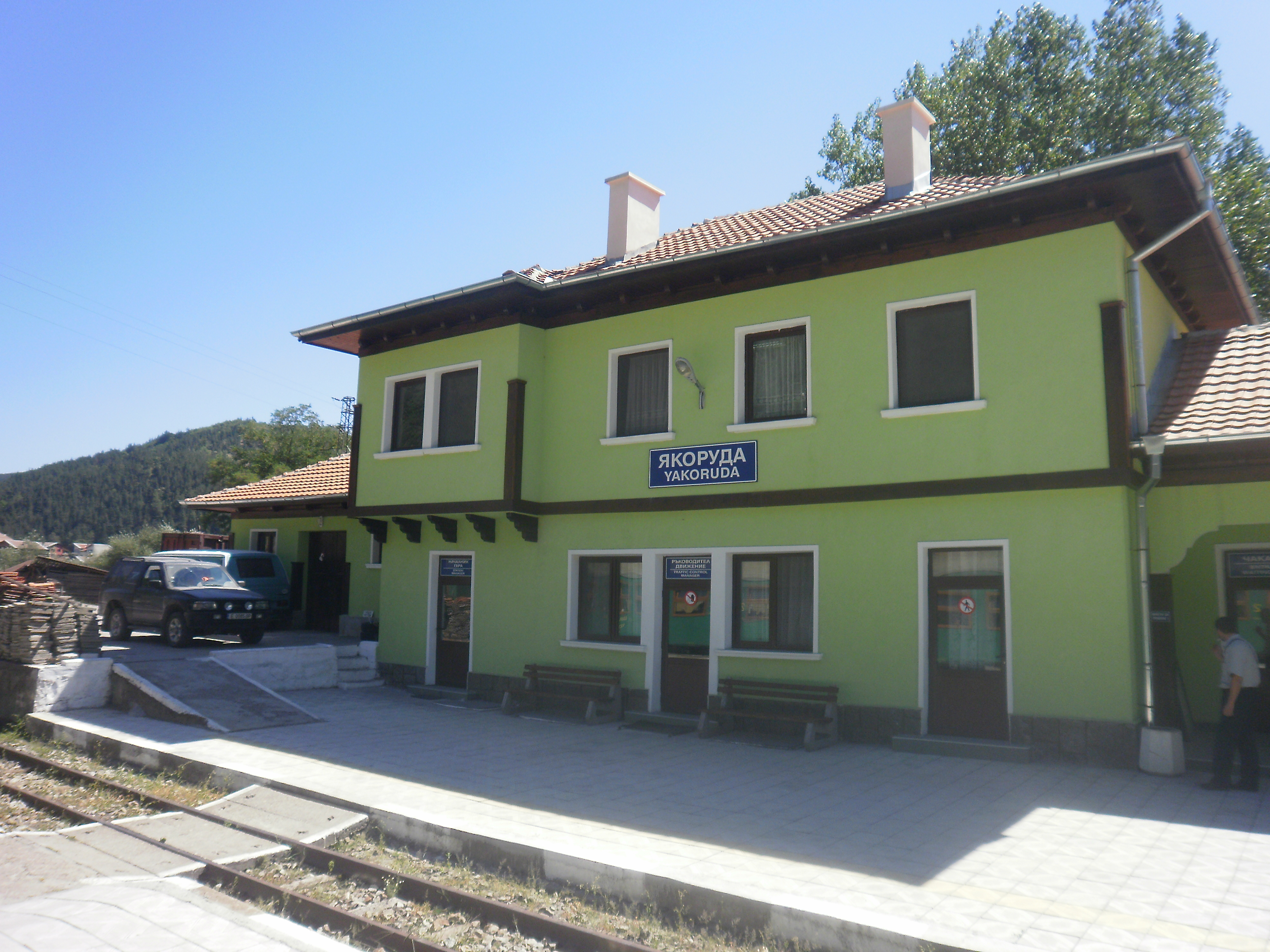
Yakoruda station

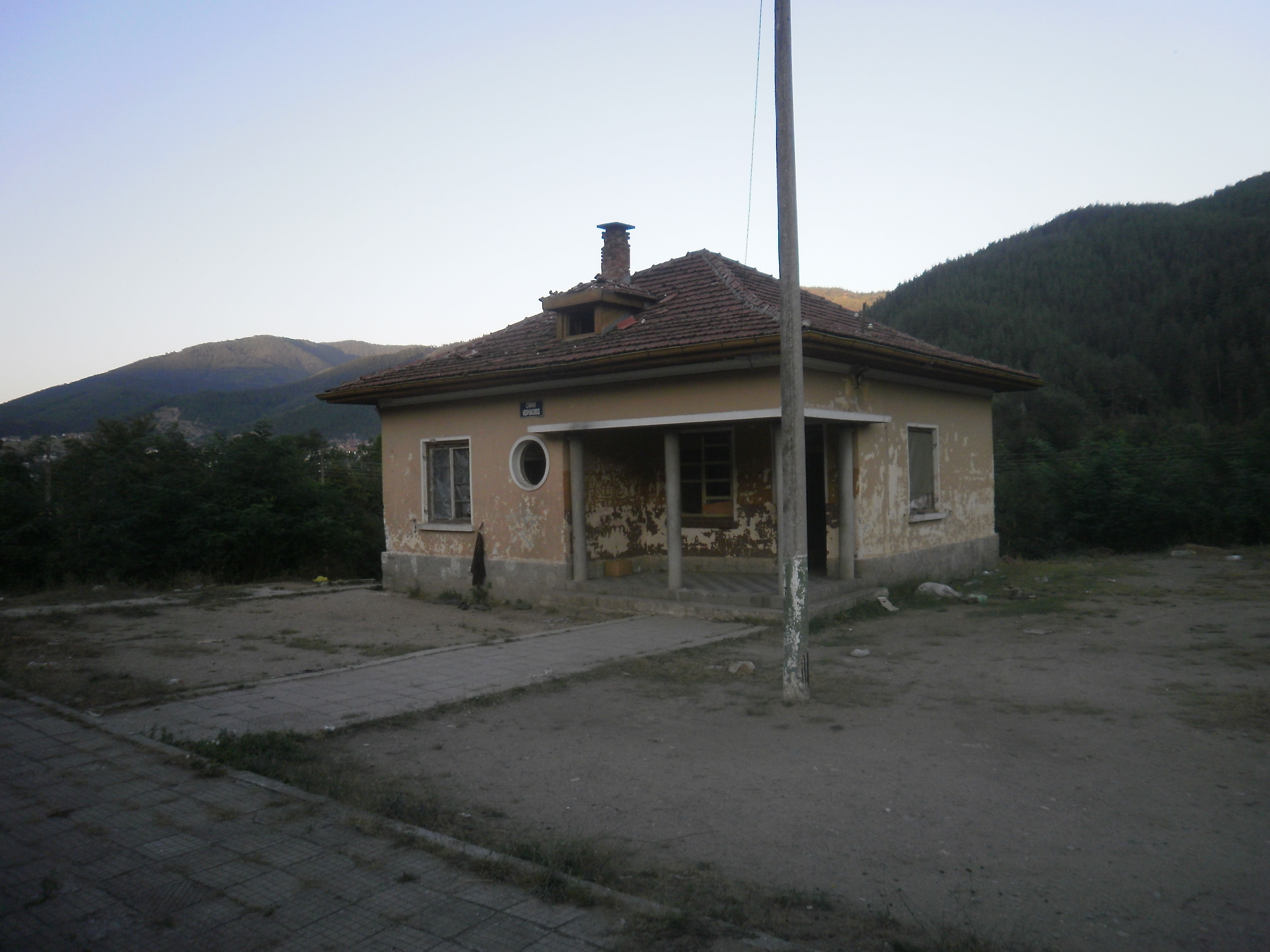
Yurukovo station

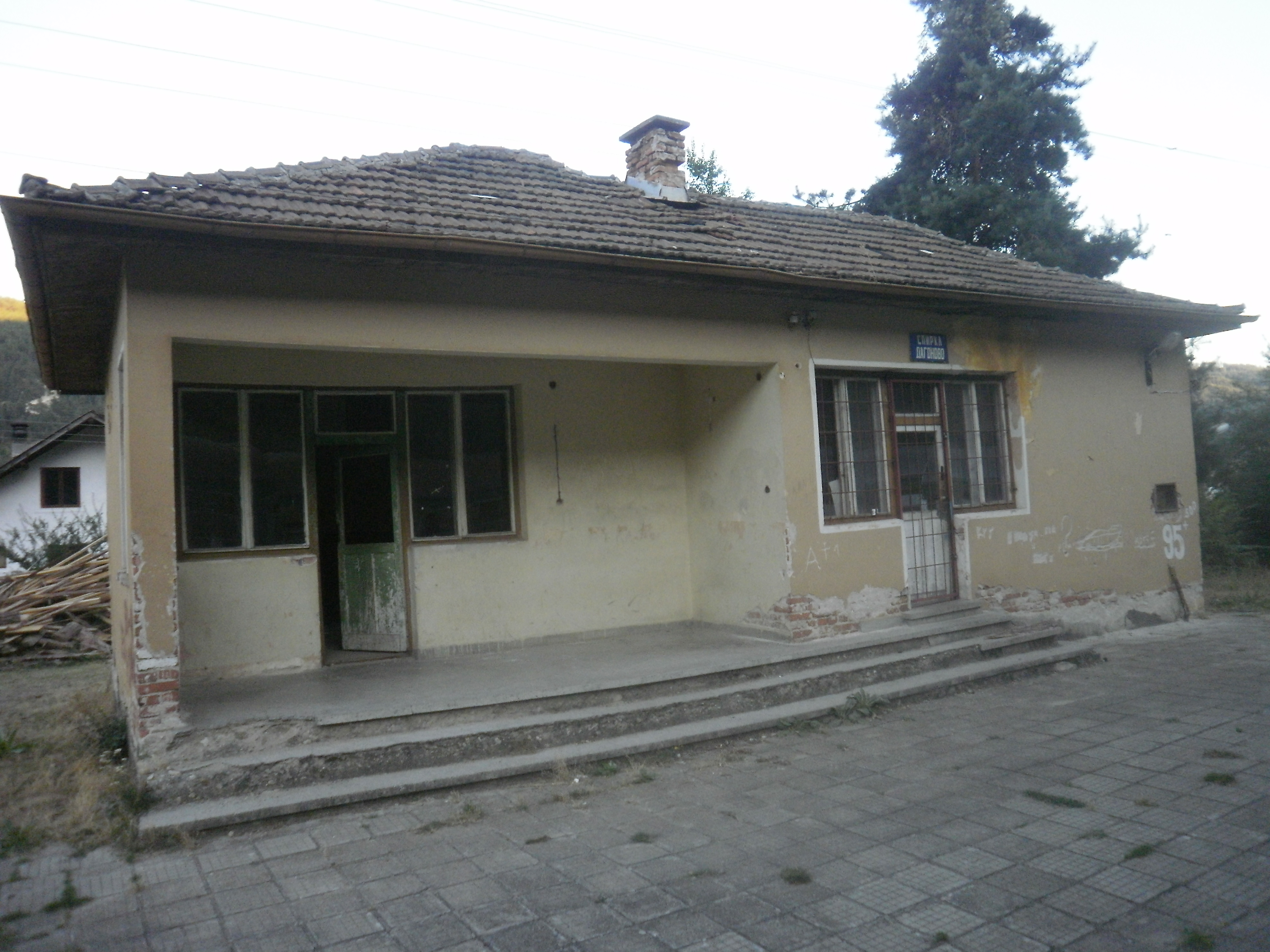
Dagonovo station

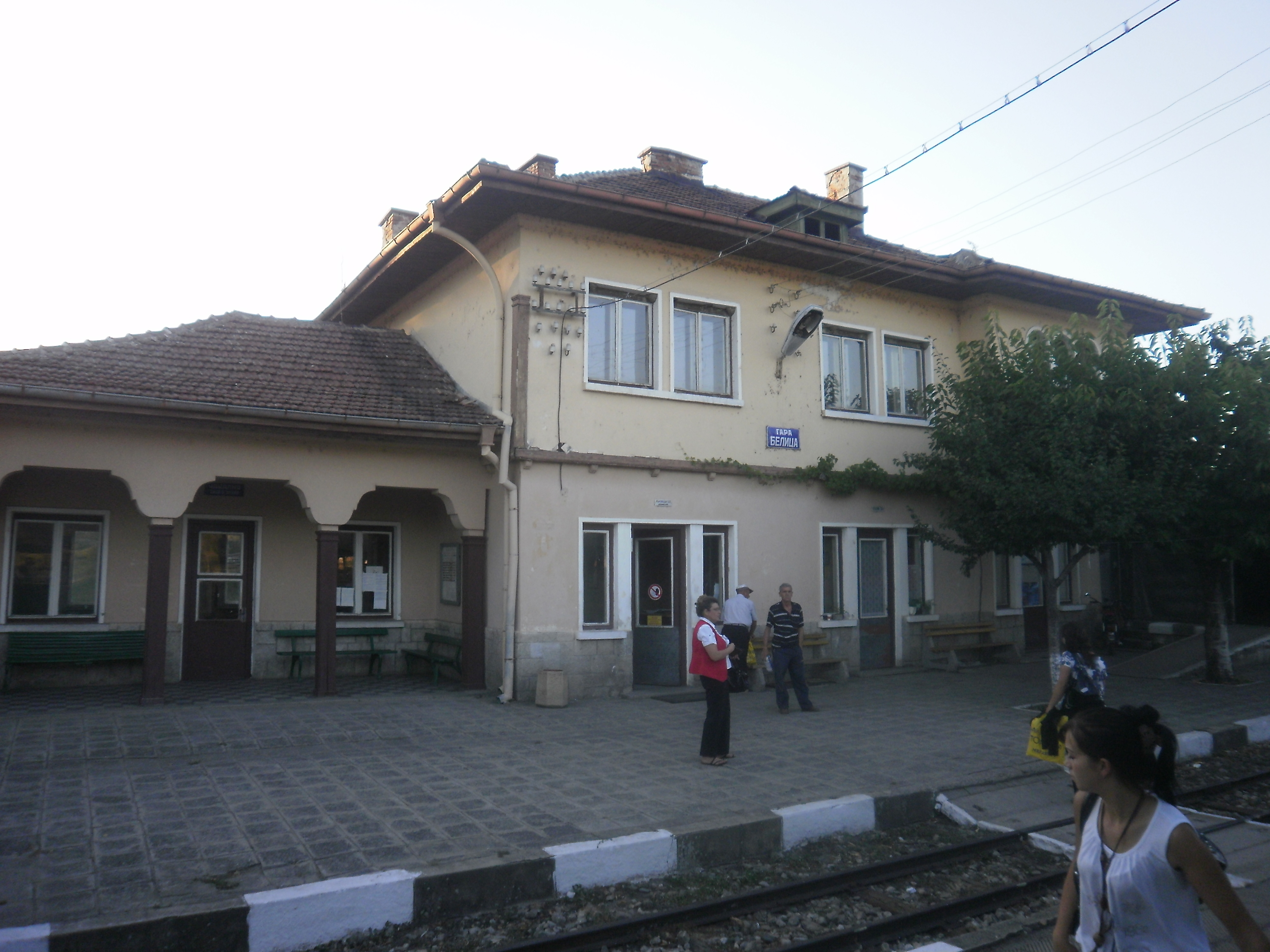
Belitsa station

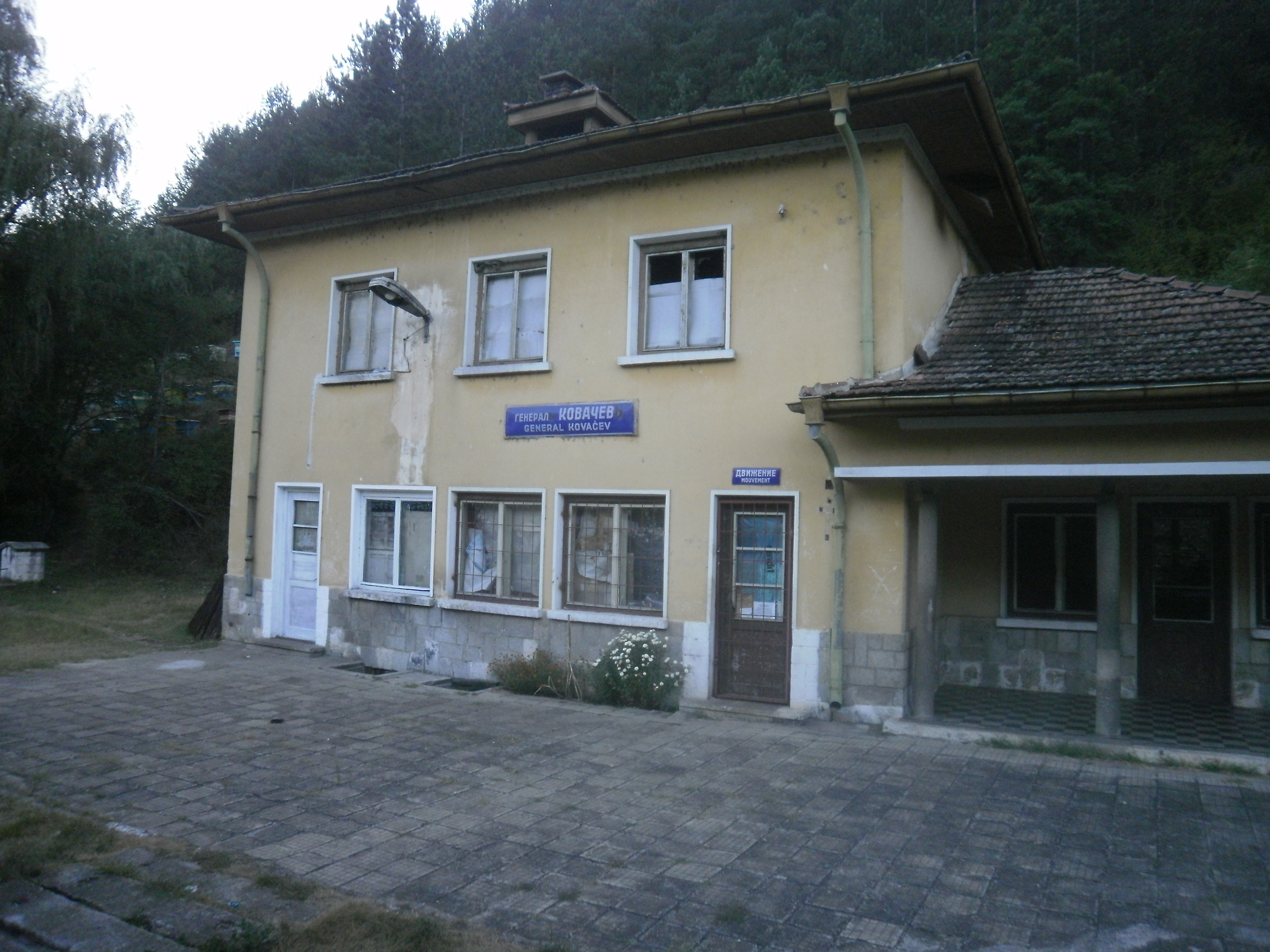
General Kovachev station

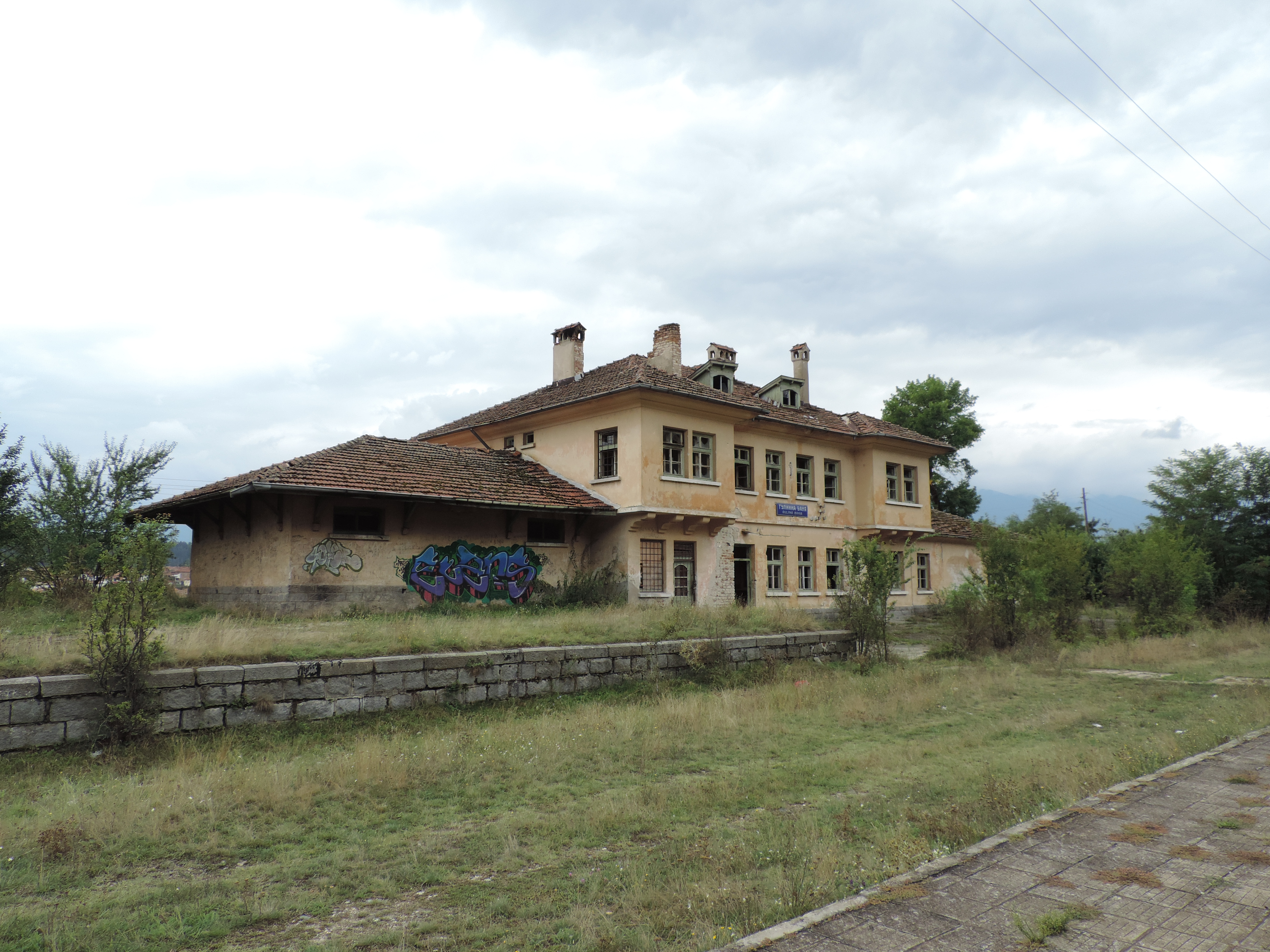
Guliyna banya station

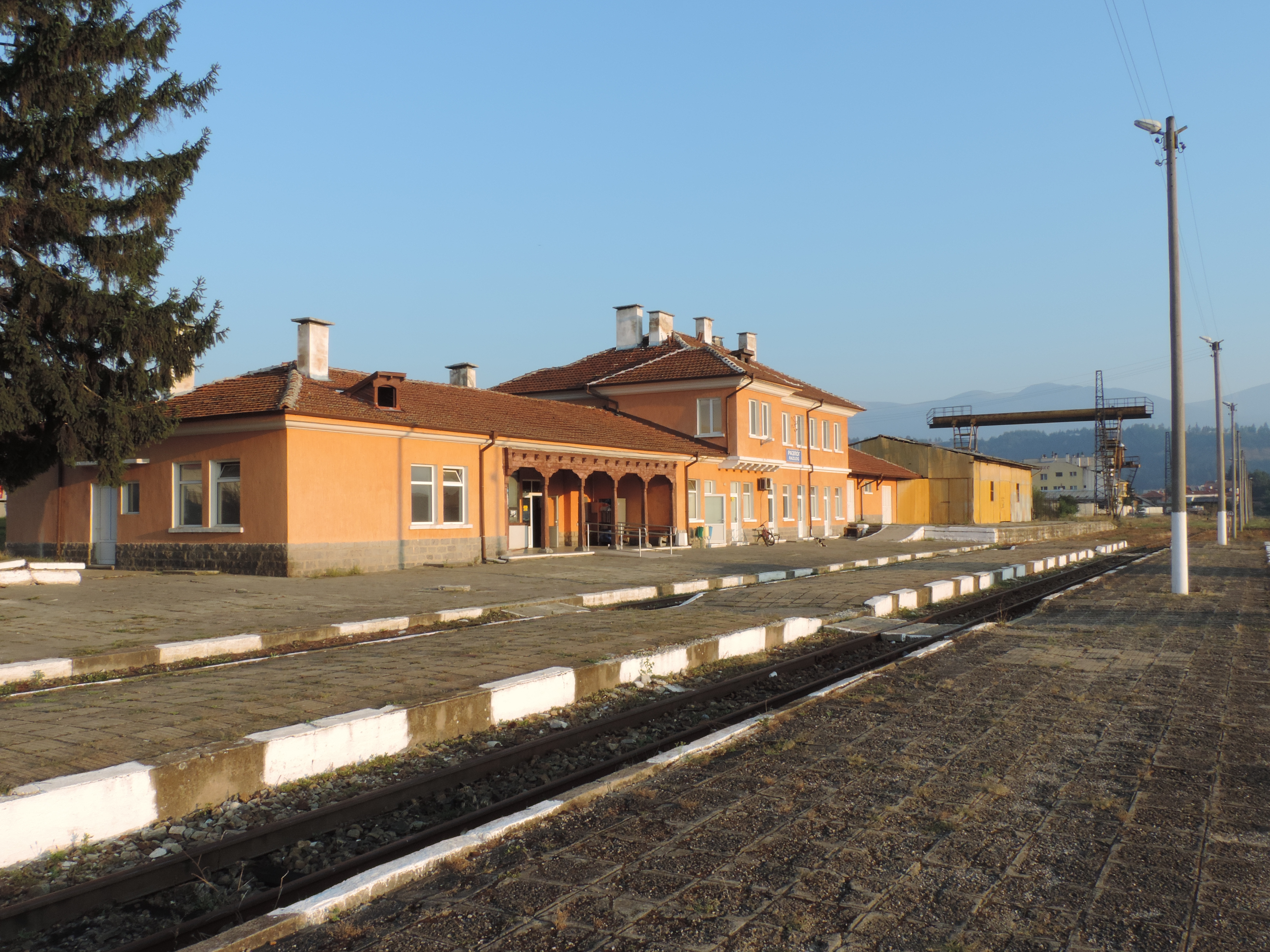
Razlog station

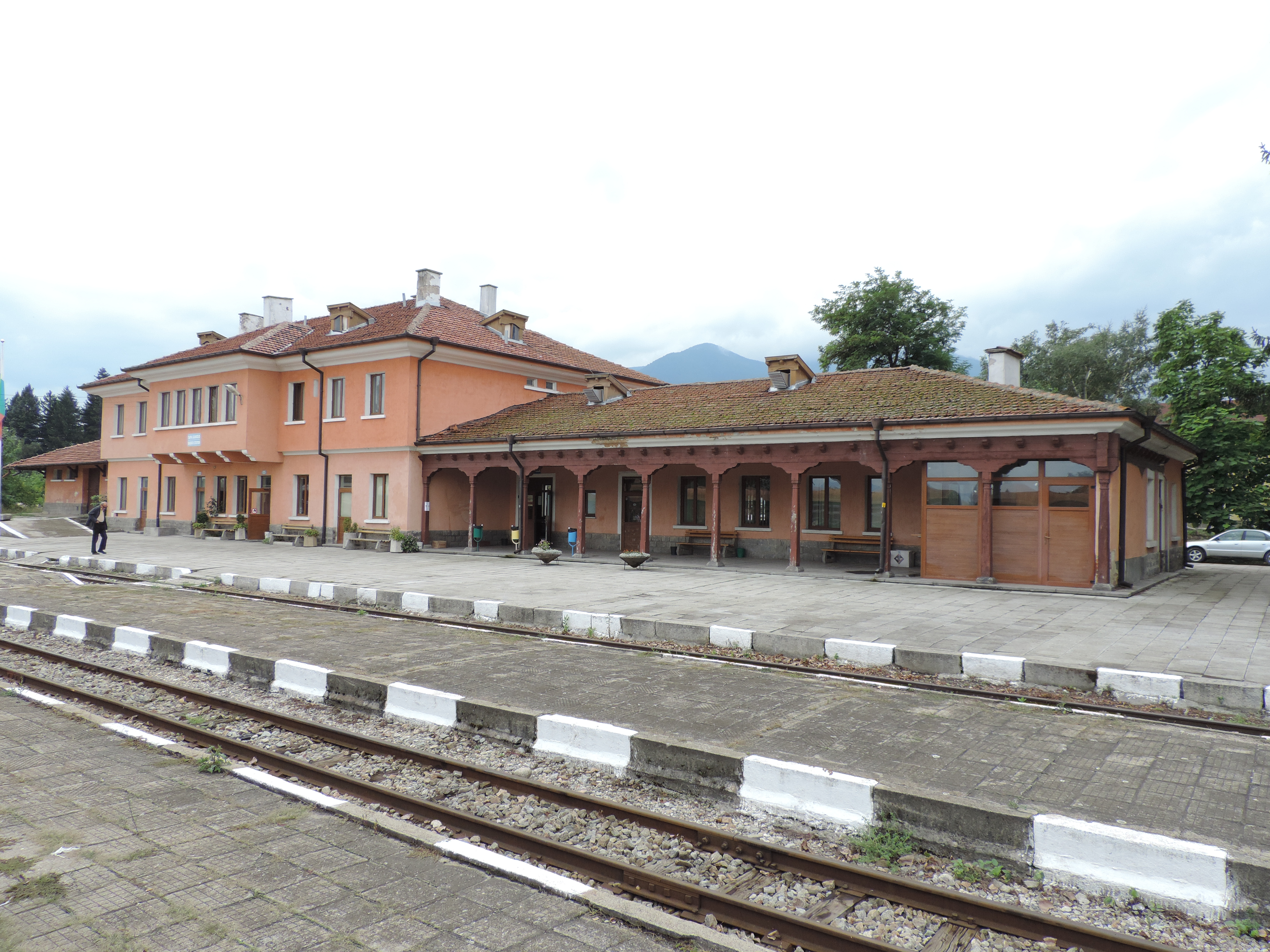
Bansko station

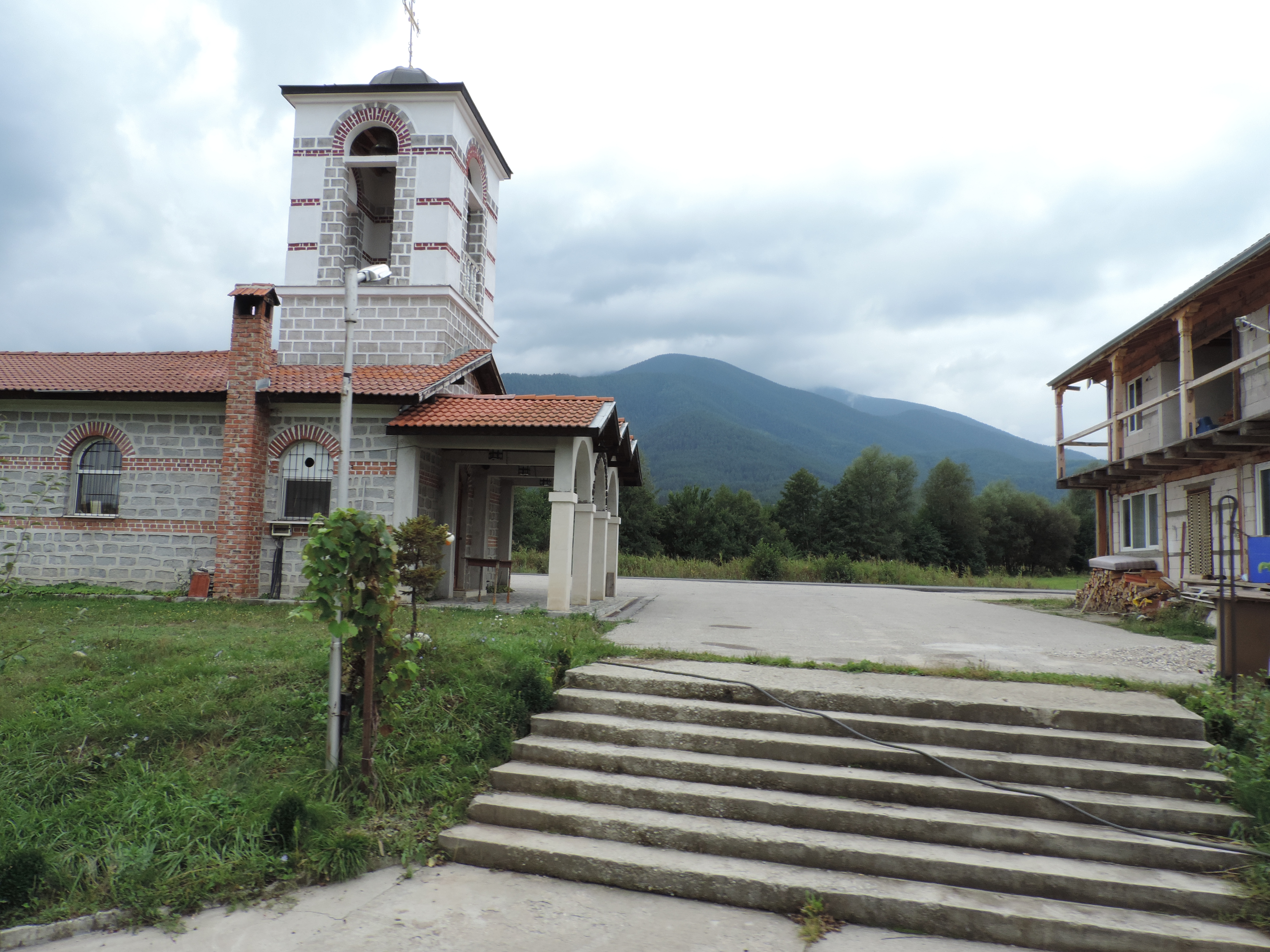
Sveti Georgi station

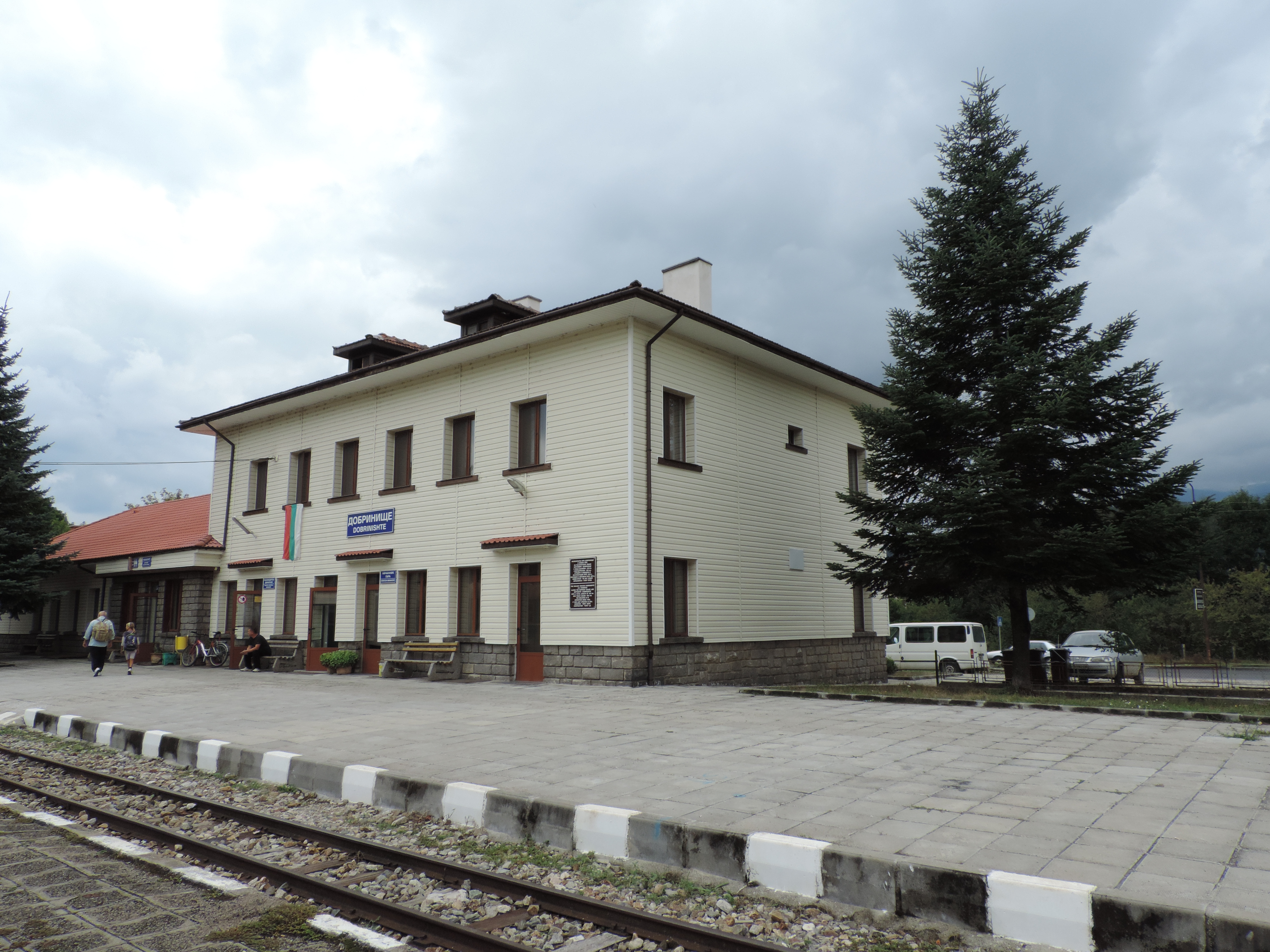
Dobrinishte station

== See also ==
- List of highest railways in Europe
