= Cherna Mesta =

Cherna Mesta Черна Места
- Cherna Mesta
- Coordinates: 42°2′N 23°44′E
- Country: Bulgaria
- Province: Blagoevgrad Province
- Municipality: Yakoruda Municipality

Area
  - Total: 3,055 km^{2} (1,180 sq mi)
- Elevation: 1,191 m (3,907 ft)

Population (2011)
  - Total: 412
- 2011 Census
- Time zone: UTC+2 (EET)
  - Summer (DST): UTC+3 (EEST)
- Postal code: 2789
- Area code: 07442

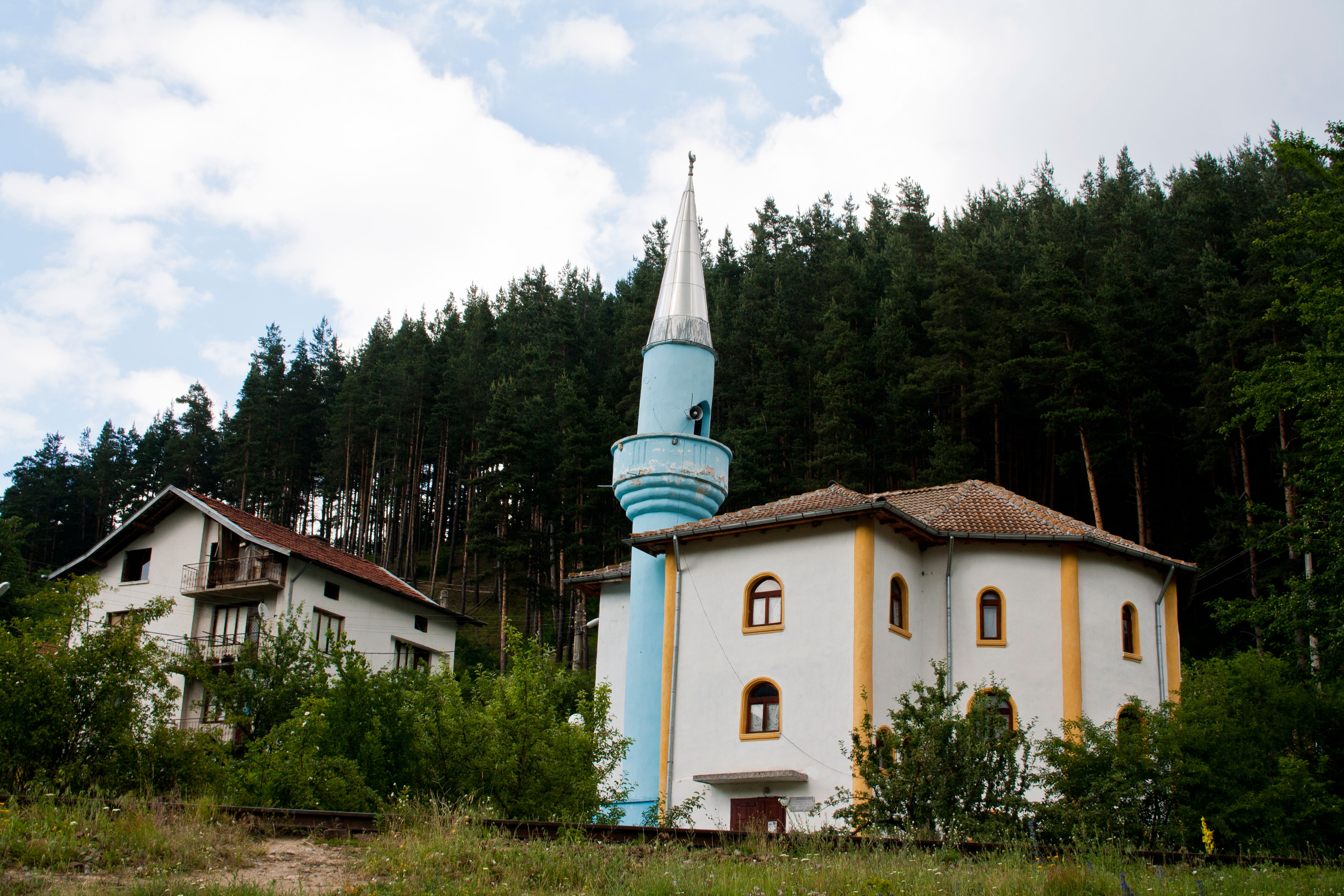
The Cherna Mesta Mosque

Cherna Mesta is a village in Yakoruda Municipality, in Blagoevgrad Province, in southwestern Bulgaria.

Most inhabitants are Pomaks, but they tend to declare themselves as ethnic Turks. The main religion in Cherna Mesta is Islam.
