= Smolevo =

- Village
- Location within Bulgaria
- Coordinates: 42°02′N 23°46′E
- Country: Bulgaria
- Province: Blagoevgrad Province
- Municipality: Yakoruda Municipality
- Time zone: UTC+2 (EET)
  - Summer (DST): UTC+3 (EEST)

Smolevo is a village in Yakoruda Municipality, in Blagoevgrad Province, in southwestern Bulgaria.
