= Karabunar =

- Village
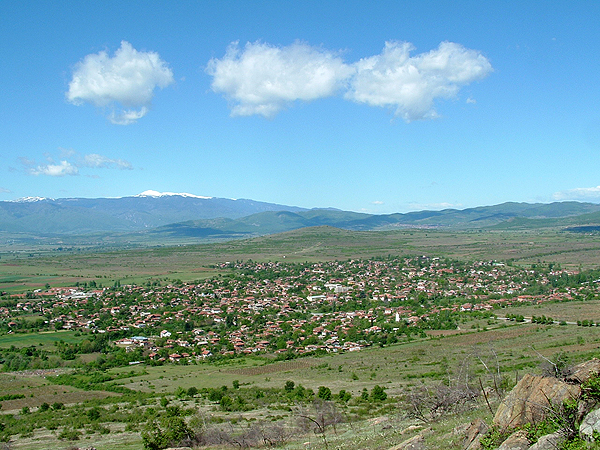

- Coat of arms

- Location within Bulgaria
- Coordinates: 42°16′01″N 24°10′01″E
- Country: Bulgaria
- Province: Pazardzhik
- Municipality: Septemvri
- Elevation: 560 m (1,840 ft)

Population (2024)
  - Total: 1,325
- Time zone: UTC+2 (EET)
  - Summer (DST): UTC+3 (EEST)
- Postal code: 4484
- Climate: Dfb

Karabunar (Bulgarian: Карабунар) is a village in located in the Septemvri Municipality of Pazardzhik Province, Bulgaria. As of 2024 its population is 1,325.

== Geography ==
The village is situated in the southeastern foothills of the Vetren Ridge of the Sredna Gora mountain range, facing the westernmost reaches the Upper Thracian Plain. The Gerenska reka, a small tributary of the Maritsa of the Aegean Sea basin, runs through the village. Karabunar falls within the transitional continental climatic zone. The soils are cinnamon forest soils.

Administratively, Karabunar is part of Septemvri Municipality, located in the central part of Pazardzhik Province. It has a territory of 25.487 km^{2}. It is located some 16 km northwest of the provincial center Pazardzhik, and 8 km northeast of the municipal seat, the town of Septemvri. The nearest settlements are the villages of Kalugerovo to the north, Pamidovo and Velichkovo to the east, Boshulya to the southeast, and Vinogradets to the northwest. It is served by the third class III-8402 road and is very close to the Trakiya motorway.

== History and culture ==
The region around Karabunar has been inhabited since antiquity, evidenced by archaeological finds of Thracian and Roman pottery, jars, a marble slab and a stone inscription. According to historian Ivan Batakliev, the village was founded by the merger of a Bulgarian settlement predating the Ottoman conquest of Bulgaria and another established by Turkish and Yörük shepherds. The name Karabunar derives from a well built by Kara Hussein, a Turkish resident from the village. The earliest written mention of Karabunar appears in the 1573 travel diary of Jakob Betzek, a courtier of Ferdinand I, who describes the village as a marketplace. In 1633, villagers from Alino settled in Karabunar after fleeing a fire.

Karabunar's first church was constructed in 1818, followed by the opening of the village's first school in 1840. Throughout the second half of the 19th century, the village underwent urban development. Its economy during this period consisted of viticulture, rice production and livestock breeding. In 1876, Karabunar sent a representative to the Oborishte assembly which took the decision to start the April Uprising and was visited by Georgi Benkovski's cheta, but did not participate in the revolt directly. The village's participation in the subsequent Russo-Turkish War of 1877–78 was limited; two people born in Karabunar fought in the conflict.

== Culture ==
The Church of St John the Baptist was constructed in 1818 and contains valuable frescoes by the renown painter of the Bulgarian National Revival Zahari Zograf. The school of Vinogradets was founded in 1864, initially a monastery school to the church. It moved to a dedicated building in 1875 and had pupils from the neighbouring villages of Pamidovo and Boshulya. The current school edifice dates from 1920. The local cultural center, known in Bulgarian as a chitalishte, was established in 1926 and was named "Vazrazhdane", meaning Revival.

== Economy ==
Karabunar lies in a fertile area and has well-developed agriculture. The main crops include vegetables, apples, and especially grapes. The local vineyards grow the old Bulgarian grape variety Pamid. There is a winery. Livestock breeding is also developed, mainly cattle, sheep, pig and turkeys.
