= Slavovitsa, Pazardzhik Province =

Slavovitsa
- Village
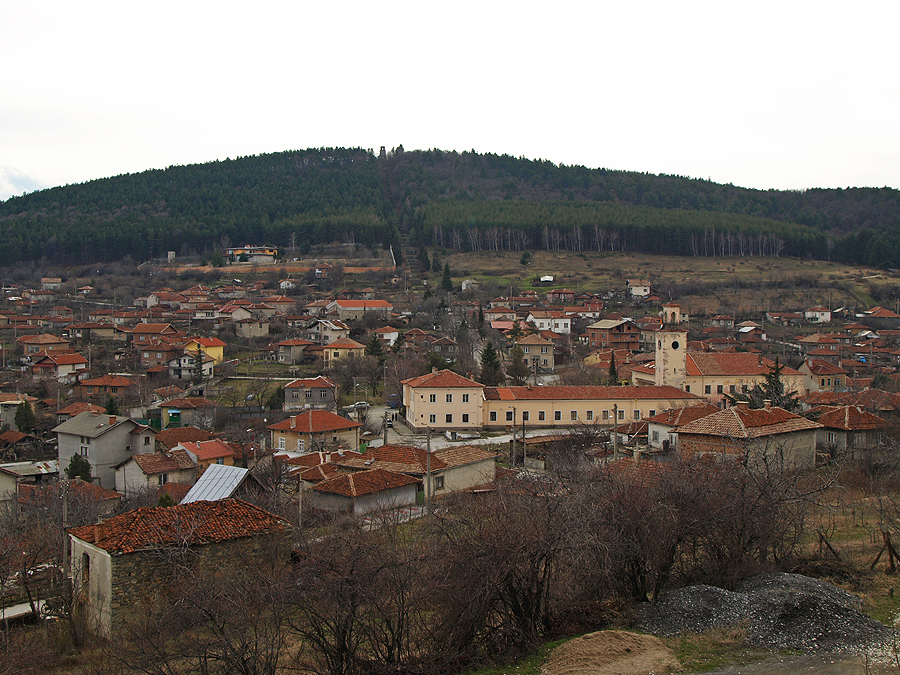

- Location within Bulgaria
- Coordinates: 42°19′01″N 24°1′59″E
- Country: Bulgaria
- Province: Pazardzhik
- Municipality: Septemvri
- Elevation: 560 m (1,840 ft)

Population (2024)
  - Total: 324
- Time zone: UTC+2 (EET)
  - Summer (DST): UTC+3 (EEST)
- Postal code: 4400
- Climate: Dfb

Slavovitsa (Bulgarian: Славовица) is a village located in the Septemvri Municipality of Pazardzhik Province, Bulgaria. As of 2024 its population is 324.

Situated in Sredna Gora, the village was founded in the 17th century as a pastoral settlement and was not mentioned in writing until 1845. After participating in the April Uprising and following the aftermath of the Russo-Turkish War of 1877–78, Slavovitsa fell under Eastern Rumelia and was incorporated into the Principality of Bulgaria after their unification. In 1923, former prime minister of Bulgaria Aleksandar Stamboliyski attempted to raise a rebellion in his birthplace following a coup d'état, which led to his execution by the IMRO.

== Geography ==
The village is situated at an altitude of about 600 m in the southeastern foothills of the Vetren Ridge of the Sredna Gora mountain range, facing the westernmost reaches of the Upper Thracian Plain, and between the rivers Maritsa and Topolnitsa. Slavovitsa falls within the transitional continental climatic zone with mild winter and warm summer with frequent droughts. The predominant winds are northwestern. The soils are alluvial and cinnamon forest soils.

Administratively, Slavovitsa is part of Septemvri Municipality, located in the central part of Pazardzhik Province. It has a territory of 26.984 km^{2}. It is located some 31 km northwest of the provincial center Pazardzhik, and 15 km north of the municipal seat, the town of Septemvri. The nearest settlements are the villages of Tserovo to the north, Lesichovo to the northeast, Vinogradets to the southeast, the town of Vetren to the south, and Gorno Varshilo to the northwest. It is situated close to a junction of the Trakiya motorway.

== History ==
The region around Slavovitsa has been inhabited since prehistoric times, proven by the remains of a Neolithic settlement. Other archaeological finds in the village include three Thracian burial mounds and pottery, as well as copper coins dating to the Roman period. The surrounding areas were home to medieval settlements and fortresses which were destroyed in the Bulgarian-Ottoman wars of the 14th century. Slavovitsa was founded as an isolated pastoral settlement in the second half of the 17th century. It was named after the Slavovi brothers, who were among the village's first settlers. The first written mention of Slavovitsa was in an 1845 Ottoman document with the Turkish name Yanık harman (Bulgarian: Изгорял харман). In 1850, the village's first church was built, with Prophet Elijah becoming its patron three years later. By 1870, Slavovitsa had 400 residents, consisting of viticulturists, farmers, and carpenters, and a school with 20 students.

Slavovitsa participated in the April Uprising of 1876, sending one representative to the Oborishte assembly. The villagers joined Georgi Benkovski's cheta which was concentrated in Eledzhik Ridge. After the uprising's suppression, most of Slavovitsa was burnt down and looted and its population fled. The village saw no action during the Russo-Turkish War of 1877–78 and after the signing of the Treaty of Berlin, it became part of Eastern Rumelia, which was protested by the residents, who signed a petition with no outcome. Following the war, the church was renovated and a new school and village municipality building were constructed. Slavovitsa experienced economic growth through the cultivation of grain crops, wine production, livestock breeding, and the emergence of crafts. It was incorporated into the Principality of Bulgaria in 1885, followed by an economic downturn due to the industrialisation policies of the successive governments of Vasil Radoslavov, Stefan Stambolov, and Konstantin Stoilov. In 1909–1910, the building of the village municipality and the school burnt down.

Slavovitsa was the birthplace of Aleksandar Stamboliyski, former prime minister of Bulgaria who served from 1919 until the 1923 coup d'état when he was ousted and later murdered by members of the Internal Macedonian Revolutionary Organization after an attempt to raise a rebellion in Slavovitsa. A few weeks after the murder, the village participated in the September Uprising.

== Economy and infrastructure ==
Slavovitsa lies in a fertile area and has well-developed agriculture. The main crops include cherries, sour cherries and grapes. The local vineyards grow the old Bulgarian grape variety Pamid. Livestock breeding is also developed, mainly sheep. Since 2005, the village maintains a nursing home for people with intellectual disabillities. Slavovitsa is connected to the third-class road III-8402 by a municipal road. The village is connected to the Vetren water supply system and has two muncipality-owned reservoirs used for irrigation.

== Culture ==
The local cultural centre, known in Bulgarian as a chitalishte, was established in 1921 and named after Aleksandar Stamboliyski. His birth house and his villa are monuments of culture.
