= Vinogradets =

- Village
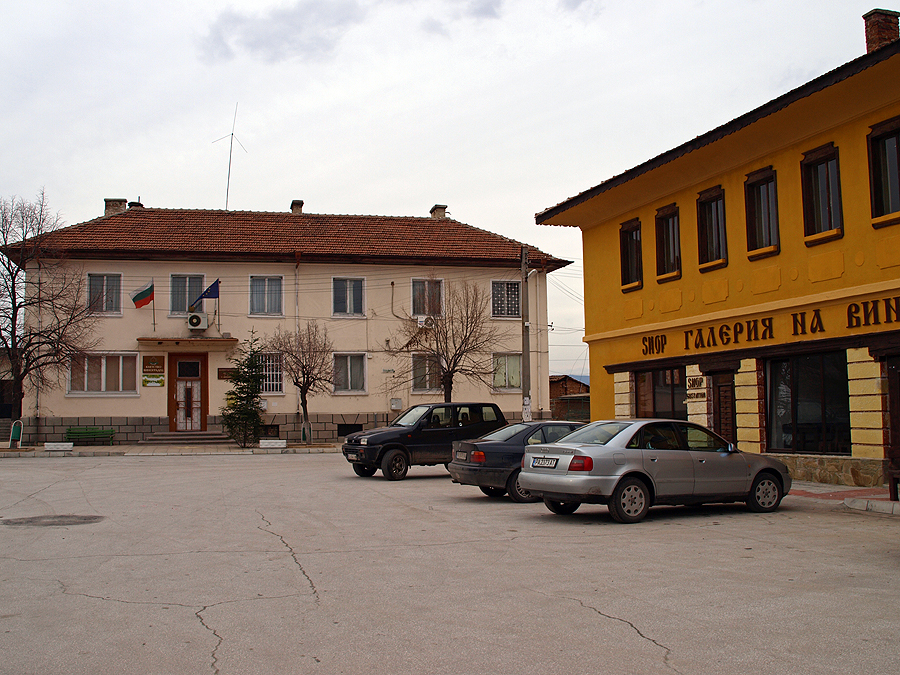

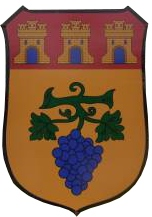
- Coat of arms

- Location within Bulgaria
- Coordinates: 42°17′00″N 24°08′00″E
- Country: Bulgaria
- Province: Pazardzhik
- Municipality: Septemvri
- Elevation: 294 m (965 ft)

Population (2024)
  - Total: 1,359
- Time zone: UTC+2 (EET)
  - Summer (DST): UTC+3 (EEST)
- Postal code: 4487
- Climate: Dfb

Vinogradets (Bulgarian: Виноградец) is a village in located in the Septemvri Municipality of Pazardzhik Province, Bulgaria. As of 2024 its population is 1,359.

== Geography ==
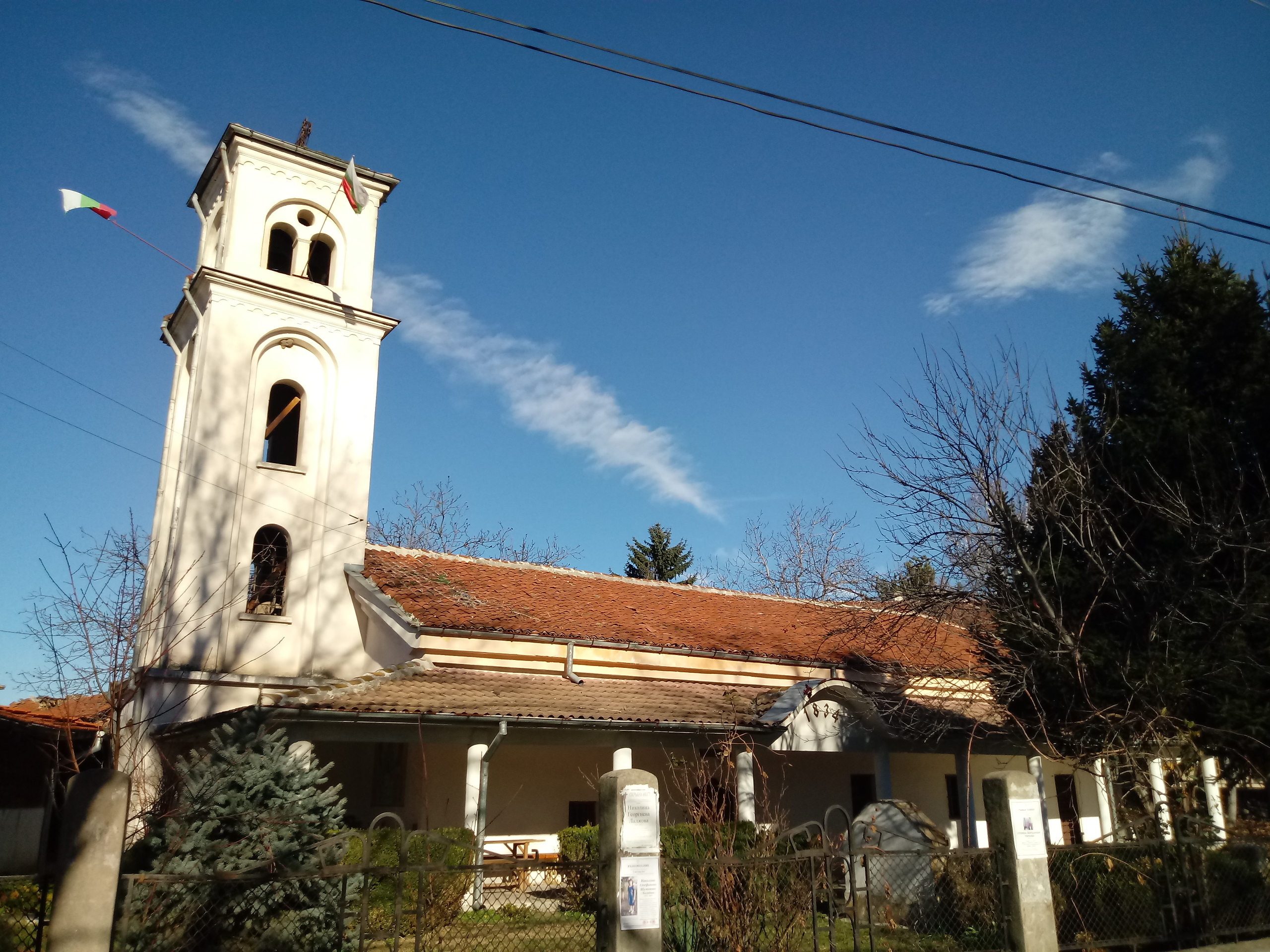
The Church of St Archangel Michael

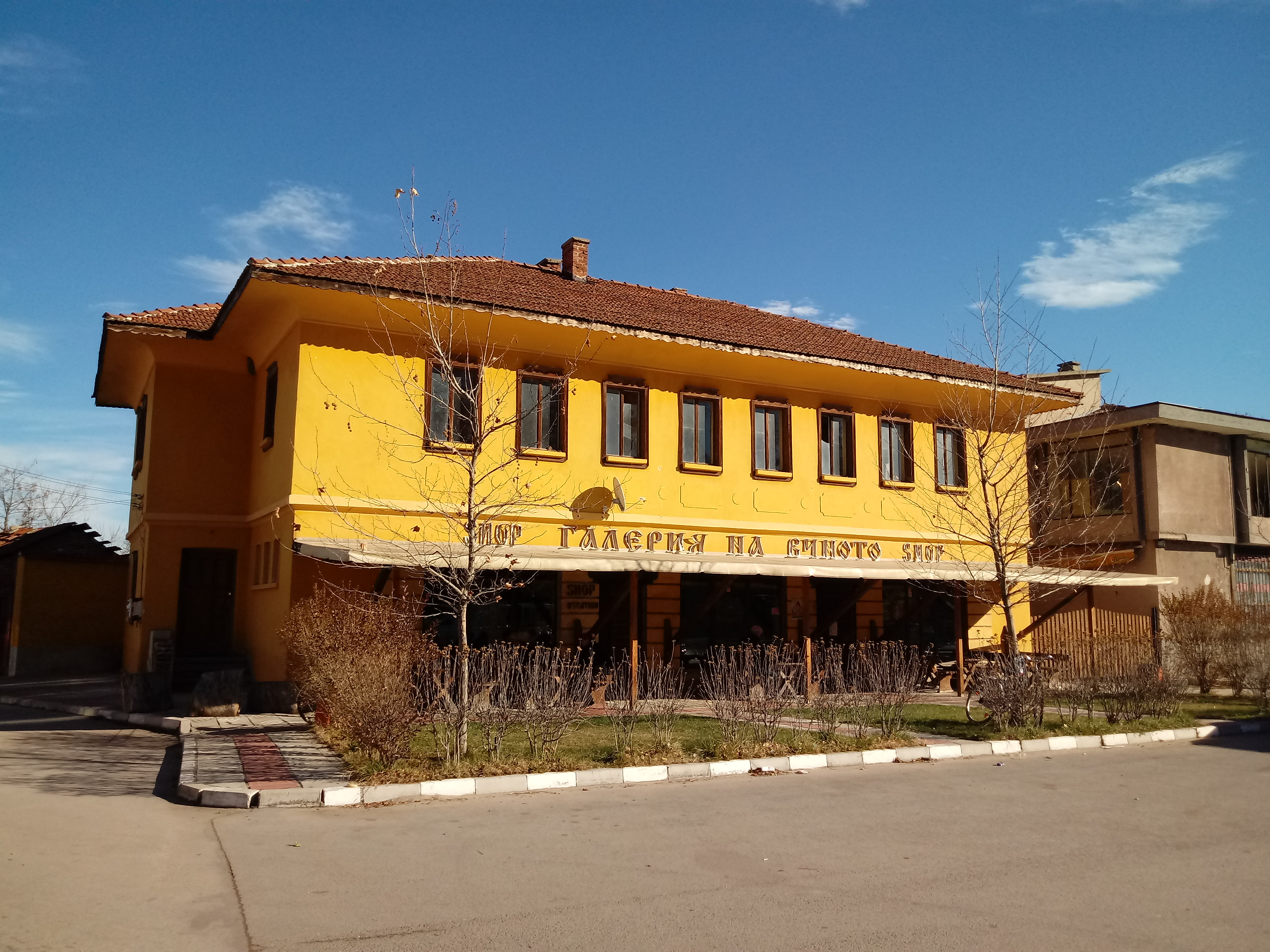
The wine gallery

The village is situated in westernmost reaches the Upper Thracian Plain, close to the foothills of the Sredna Gora mountain range. It lies about two kilometers west of the river Topolnitsa, a major tributary of the Maritsa of the Aegean Sea basin. Vinogradets falls within the transitional continental climatic zone. The soils are cinnamon forest soils.

Administratively, Vinogradets is part of Septemvri Municipality, located in the central part of Pazardzhik Province. It has a territory of 38.69 km^{2}. It is located some 20 km northwest of the provincial center Pazardzhik, and 9 km north of the municipal seat the town of Septemvri. The nearest settlements are the villages of Lesichovo to the north, Kalugerovo to the northeast, Karabunar to the southeast, and the small town of Vetren to the west. It is served by the third class III-8402 road and is very close to the Trakiya motorway.

== History and culture ==
In the vicinity of the village are the ruins of three medieval fortresses. The modern village was established in the late 17th or early 18th century. Vinogradets participated in the preparation of the anti-Ottoman April Uprising of 1876 and had a representative at the assembly in the Oborishte locality, which took the decision to begin the revolt. During the uprising the whole village of about 140 houses was looted and burned by the Ottoman bashi-bazouk.

The school of Vinogradets was founded in 1850. There is a church dedicated to the Archangel Michael. The local cultural center, known in Bulgarian as a chitalishte, was established in 1928 and was named after the Bulgarian educator Petar Beron. Regular events include the Kukeri festival at Zagovezni, as well as the village fair on 15 August.

== Economy ==
Vinograd lies in a fertile area and has a well-developed agriculture. The main crops include wheat, fruits, and especially grapes. The village specializes in old Bulgarian grape varieties Pamid and Tamyanka. There is a large winery. Livestock breeding is also developed, mainly sheep.
