= Vetren, Pazardzhik Province =

Vetren Ветрен
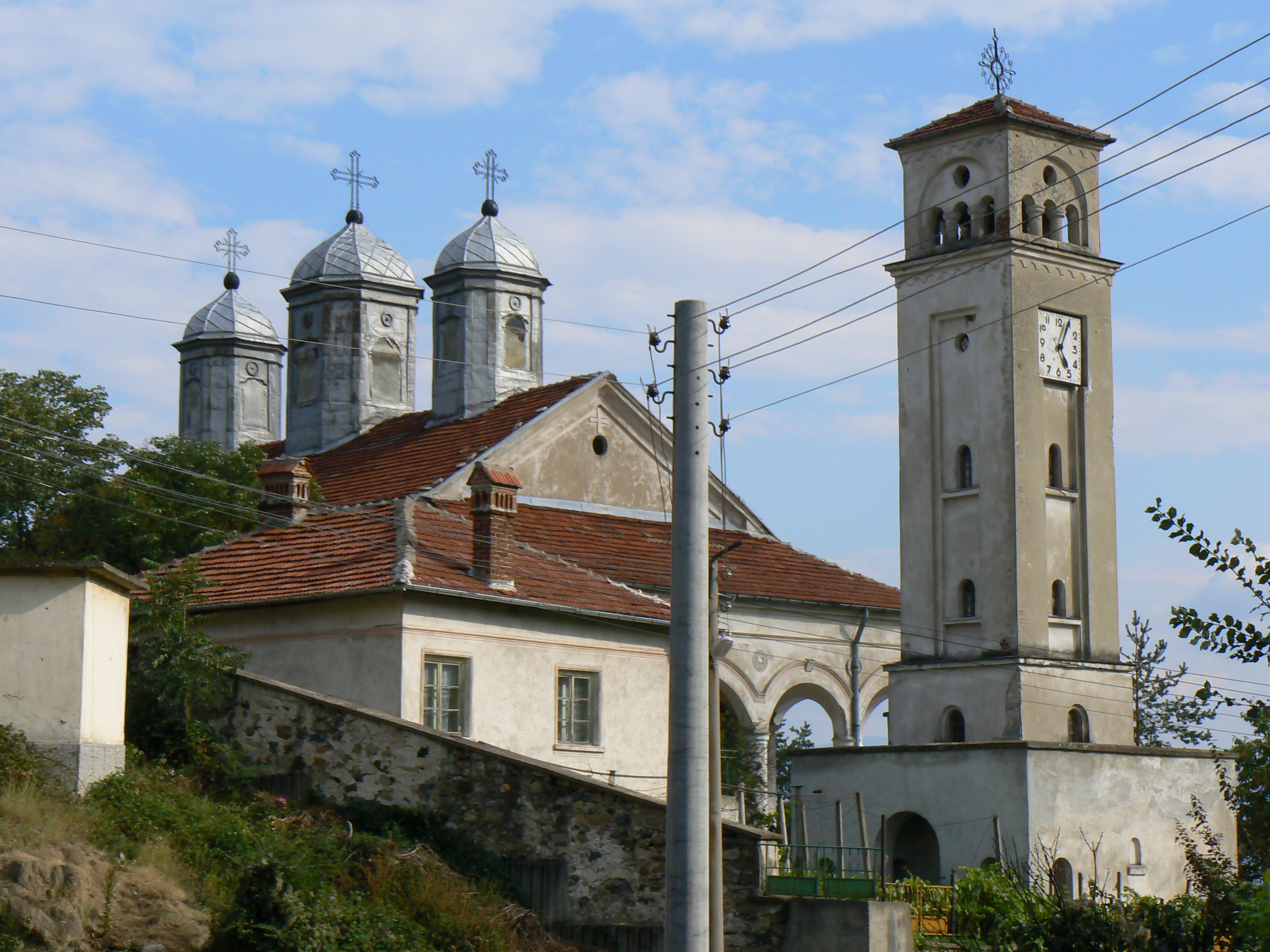
- Church of St Nicholas in Vetren

- Vetren
- Coordinates: 42°16′00″N 24°03′00″E
- Country: Bulgaria
- Province (Oblast): Pazardzhik

Government
  - Mayor: Pencho Penchov
- Elevation: 360 m (1,180 ft)

Population (2010)
  - Total: 2,844
- Time zone: UTC+2 (EET)
  - Summer (DST): UTC+3 (EEST)
- Postal Code: 4480
- Area code: 03584

Vetren (Bulgarian: Ветрен [ˈvɛtrɛn]) is a small town in the Pazardzhik Province, Bulgaria. It is one of the newest towns in the country, as it gained its town status in 2003. The population is 2,844.

== Geography ==
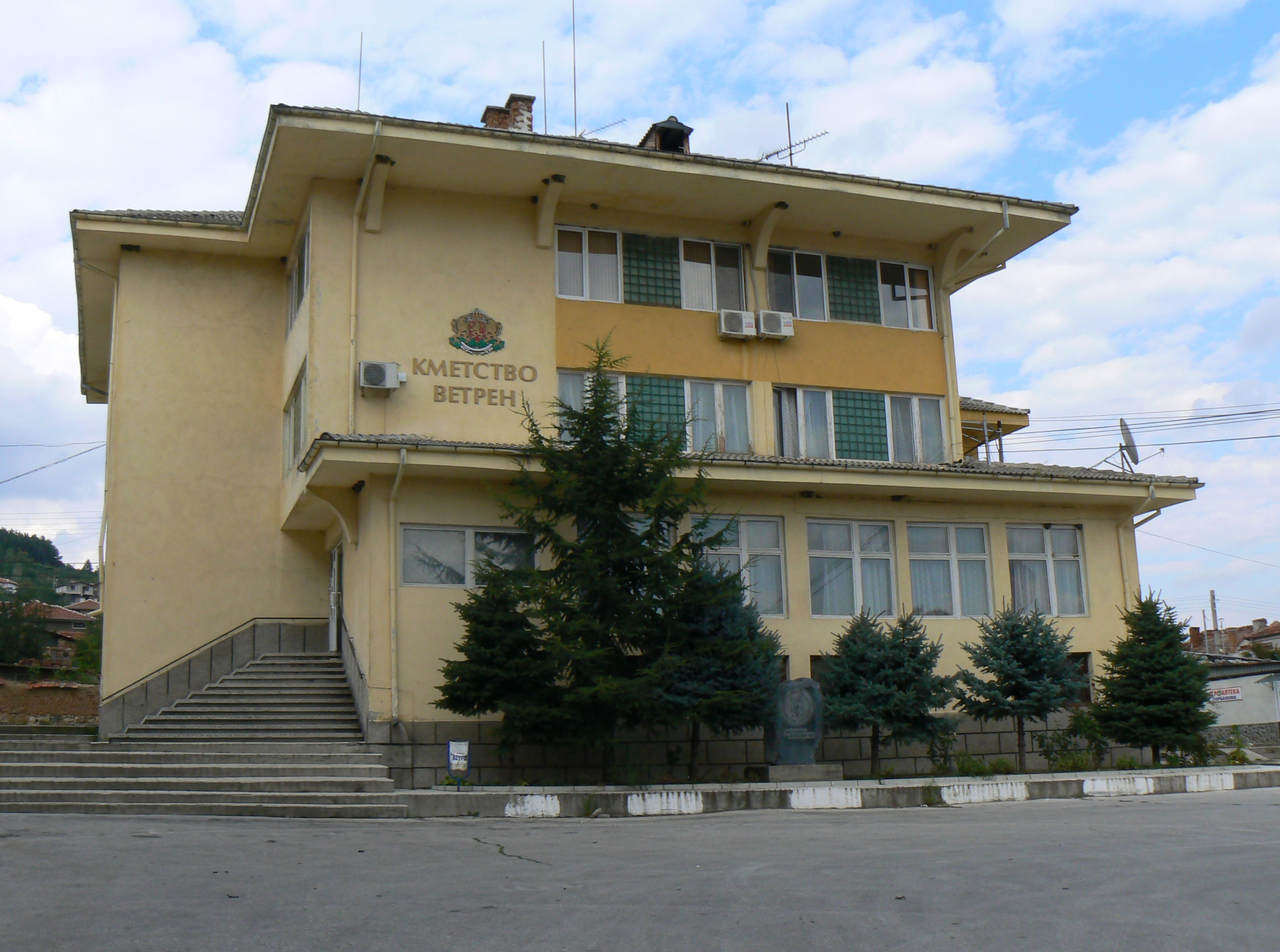
The town hall of Vetren

The town is situated at an altitude of 360 m on the southeastern foothills of the Vetren Ridge of the Sredna Gora mountain range, facing the westernmost reaches the Upper Thracian Plain. It is strategically located on the eastern exit of the important Gate of Trajan mountain pass. It lies about 4–5 km north of river the Maritsa of the Aegean Sea basin. Vetren falls within the transitional continental climatic zone. The soils are cinnamon forest soils.

Administratively, Vetren is part of Septemvri Municipality, located in the central–western part of Pazardzhik Province. It has a territory of 64.545 km^{2}. It is located some 27 km northwest of the provincial center Pazardzhik, 12 km northwest of the municipal seat of Septemvri, and 12 km north north of the town of Belovo. The nearest settlements are the villages of Slavovitsa to the north, Vinogradets to the east, and Akandzhievo to the south. It is served by the third class III-3704 road and is very close to the Trakiya motorway.

== History and culture ==
The remains of the ancient Greek trade center Pistiros are located near the town. Vetren is also the site of the Roman castrum Tegulicum, built in the early 2nd century AD by a unit of Legio XI Claudia. "The name may indicate that a brickyard existed in the vicinity, supplying Durostorum with its product."

In the vicinity of Vetren are the ruins of a medieval fortress. The modern settlement was established in the early 15th century as a station along the ancient road Via Militaris. It was mentioned in Ottoman registers of 1479 and 1576. Vetren participated in the preparation of the anti-Ottoman April Uprising of 1876 and had three representatives at the assembly in the Oborishte locality, which decided to begin the revolt. During the uprising its inhabitants took arms, and in the aftermath of its suppression, the settlement was burnt down by the regular Ottoman army.

The first school of Vetren was founded before 1840. There is a church dedicated to St Nikolas. The local cultural center, known in Bulgarian as a chitalishte, was established in 1904 and was named after the Bulgarian poet Hristo Smirnenski. It contains a small museum.

== Economy ==
Vinograd lies in a fertile area and has well-developed agriculture. The main crops include grapes, fruits and vegetables. Livestock breeding is also developed, mainly cattle and sheep. There are several small industrial establishments.
