= Tserovo, Pazardzhik Province =

Tserovo
- Village
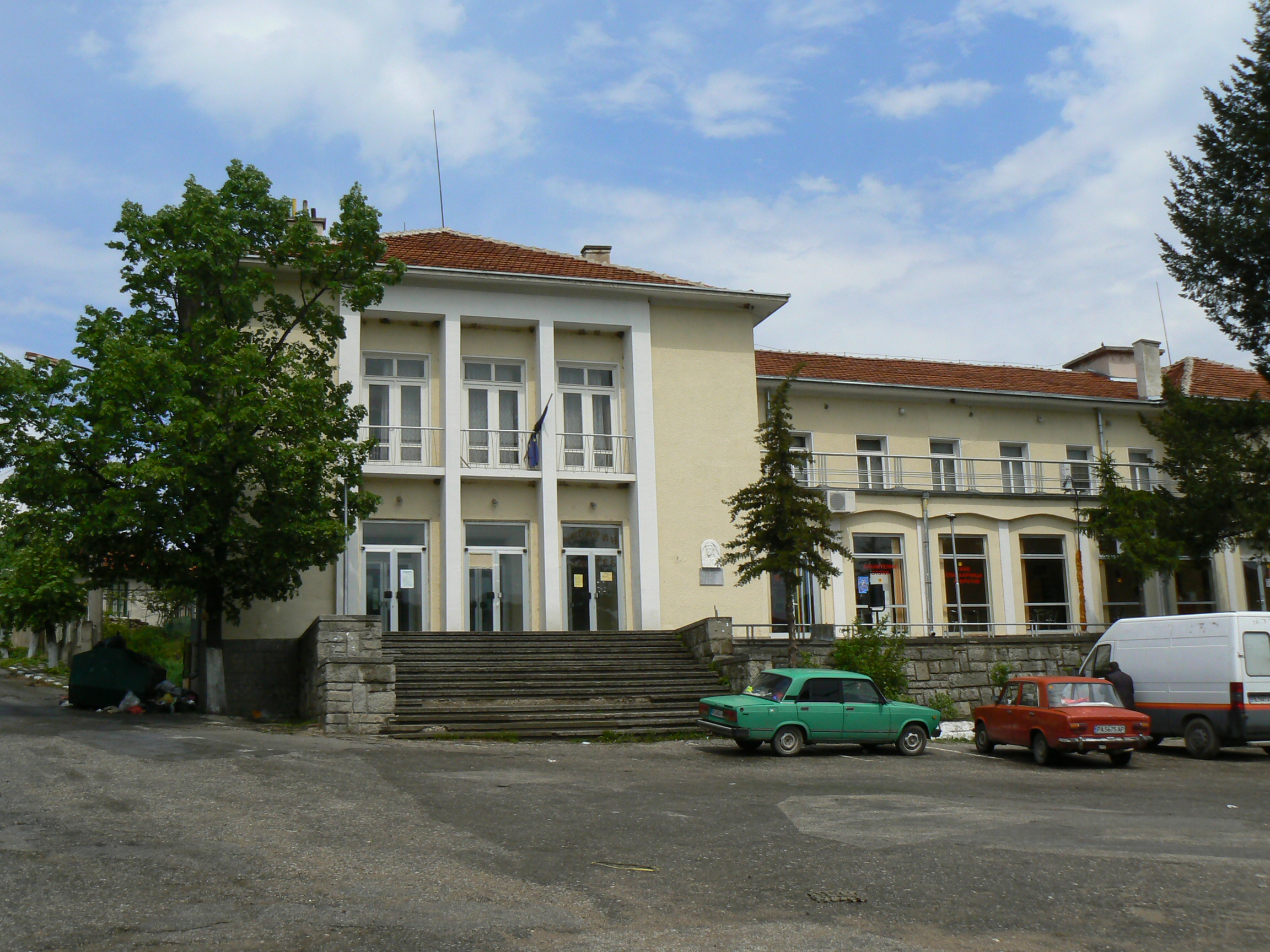

- Location within Bulgaria
- Coordinates: 42°21′27.61″N 24°3′9.61″E
- Country: Bulgaria
- Province: Pazardzhik
- Municipality: Lesichovo
- Elevation: 357 m (1,171 ft)

Population (2024)
  - Total: 886
- Time zone: UTC+2 (EET)
  - Summer (DST): UTC+3 (EEST)
- Postal code: 4465

Tserovo (Bulgarian: Церово) is a village located in the Lesichovo Municipality of Pazardzhik Province, Bulgaria. As of 2024 its population is 324.

== Geography ==
The village is situated at an altitude of about 350 m in the southeastern foothills of the Vetren Ridge of the Sredna Gora mountain range, facing the westernmost reaches the Upper Thracian Plain. About a kilometer north flows the river Topolnitsa.

Administratively, Tserovo is part of Lesichovo Municipality, located in the northwestern part of Pazardzhik Province. It has a territory of 38.494 km^{2}. The nearest settlements are the villages of Slavovitsa to the south and Lesichovo to the east. Tserovo is served by the Trakiya motorway, lying just north of a junction along the highway.

== History and culture ==
The first mention of the village dates from the end of the 17th century. In his 1870 Description of the Tatar Pazardzhik Kaaza the local historian Stefan Zahariev noted that during the construction of the settlement's new church in the 1860 chariots from the time of Alexander the Great, several gold coins and other valuable objects were found. The population of Tserovo actively participated in the preparation of the anti-Ottoman April Uprising of 1876.

Some 9 km west of the village, in a forested area in Sredna Gora already with the territory of Sofia Province, are the ruins of the medieval fortress Lyubnishko Kale along the strategic ancient road Via Militaris. The edifice of the local cultural center, known in Bulgarian as a chitalishte, was inaugurated in 1961; it is named after the revolutionary Georgi Benkovski.

== Economy ==
Tserovo lies in an agricultural area with orchards, mainly cherries. Livestock breeding is also developed, mostly sheep.

== Gallery ==
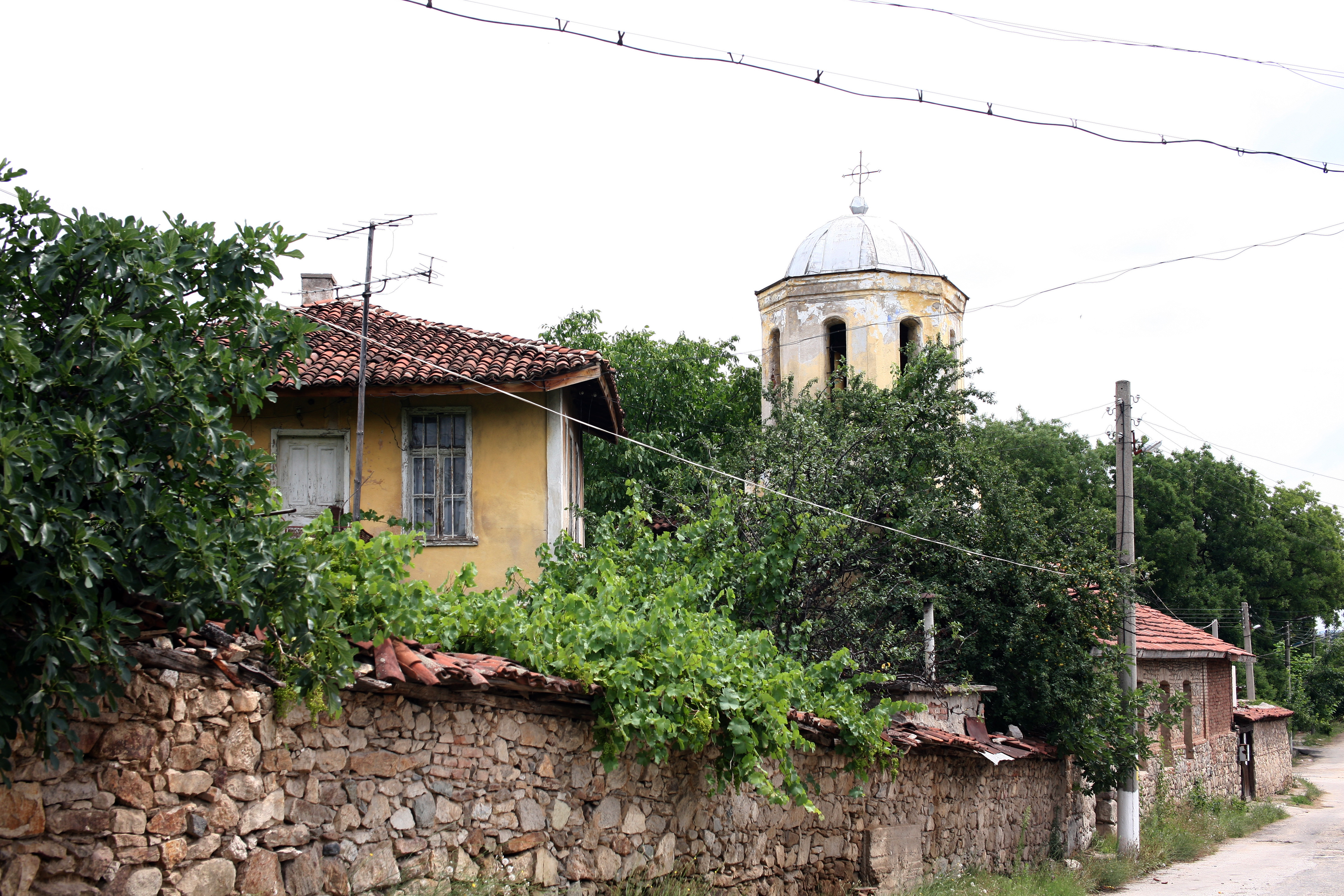
An old house and the church belfry

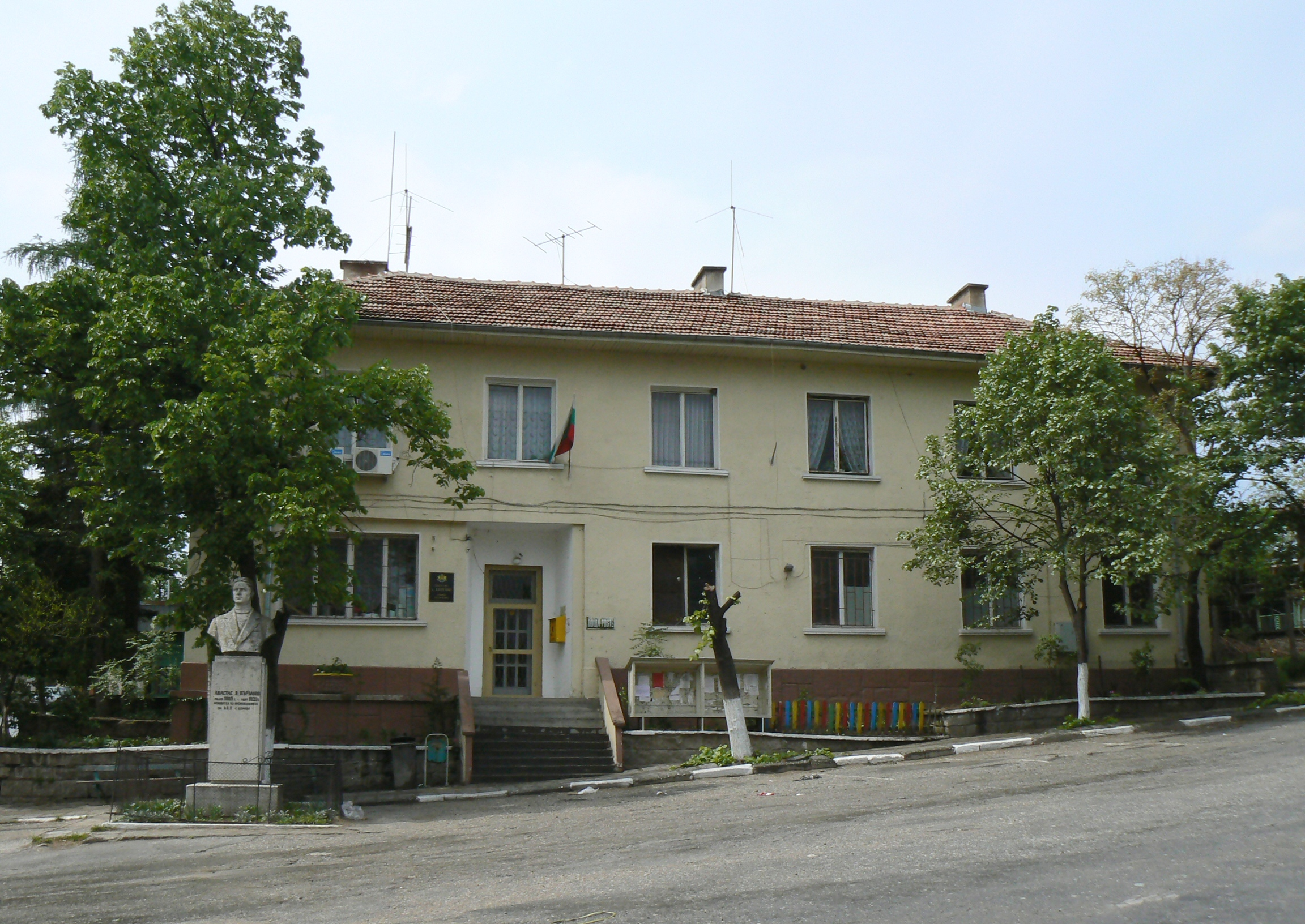
The village hall

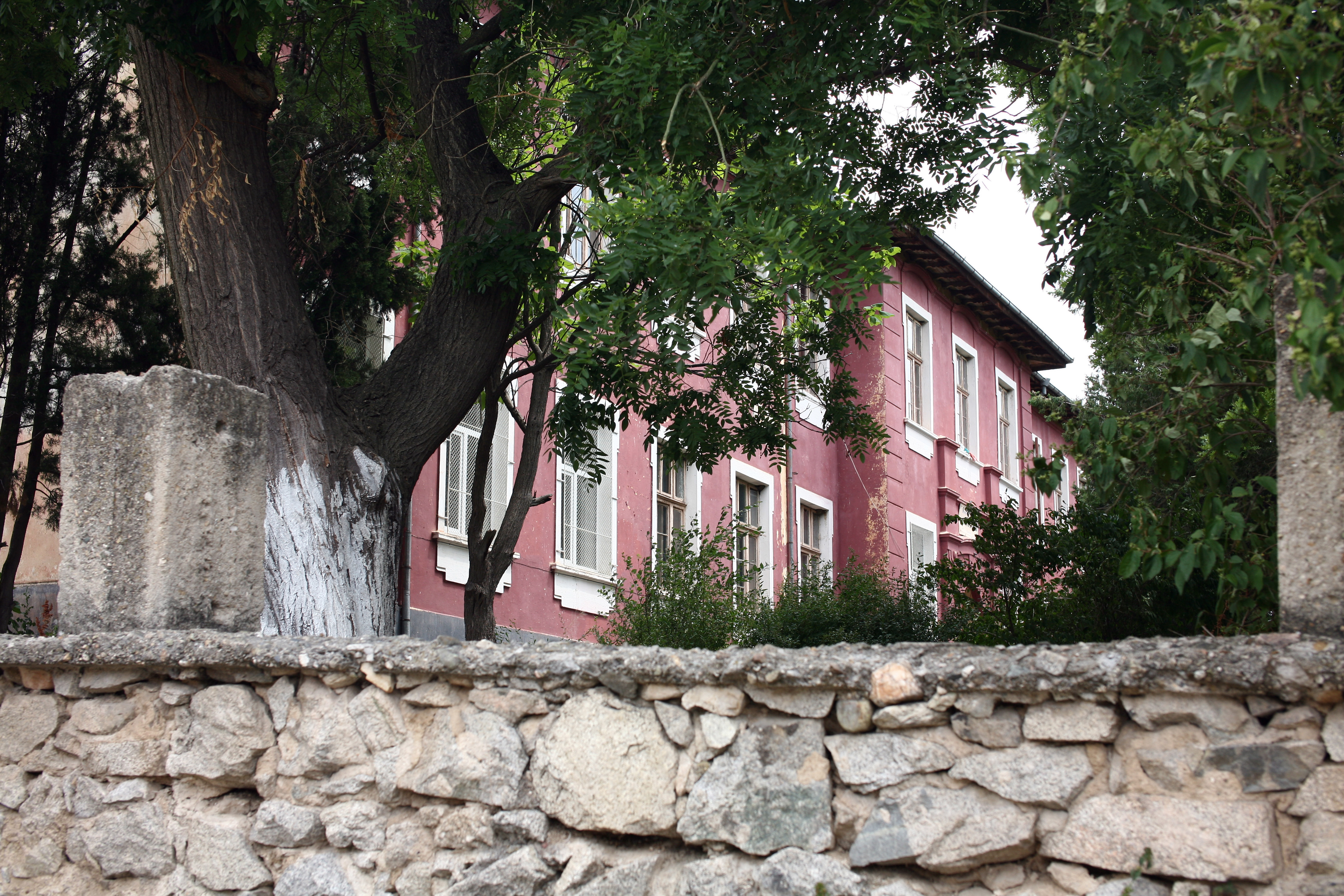
The school

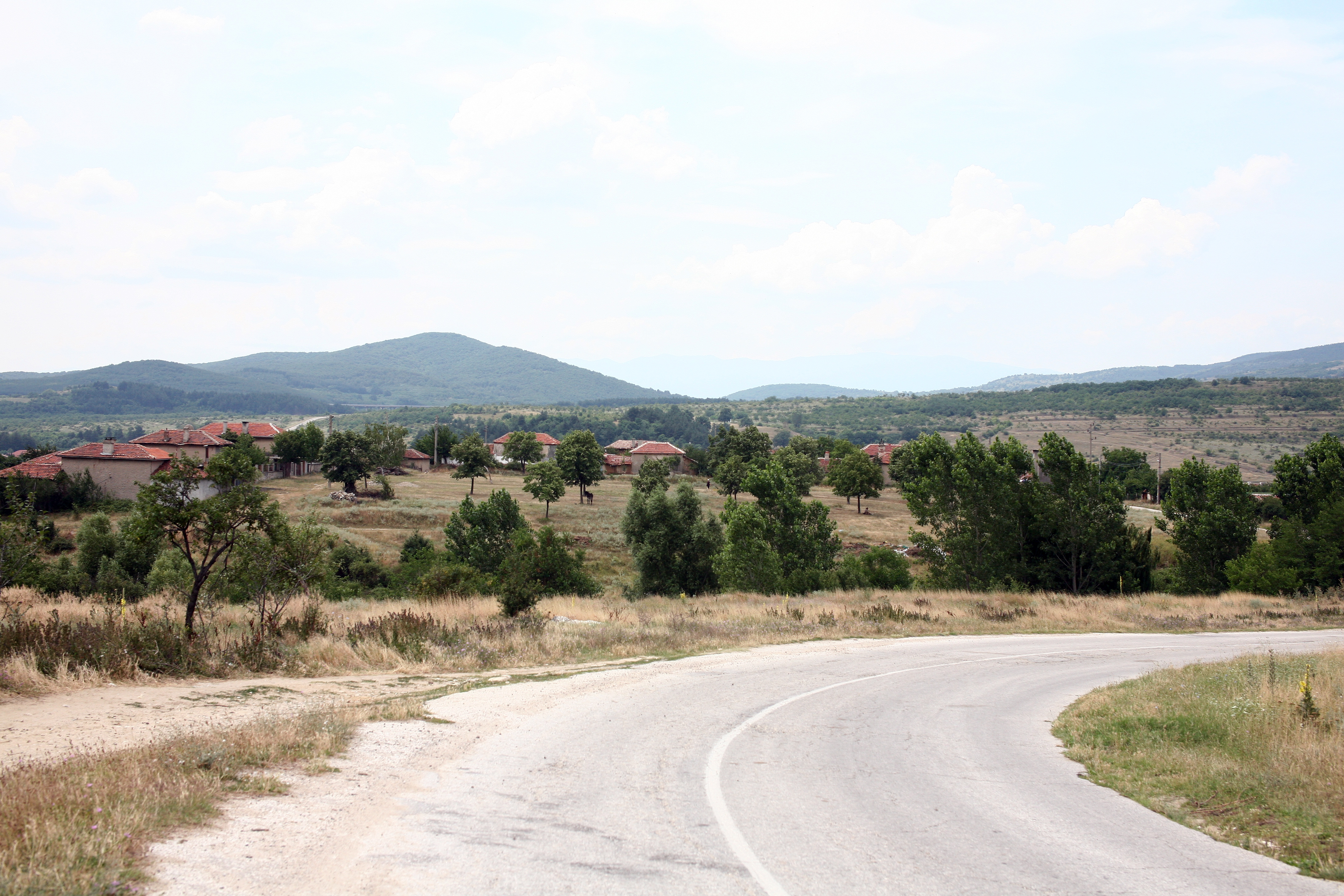
A partial view of Tserovo
