= Slavovitsa =

Slavovitsa may refer to the following places in Bulgaria:

- Slavovitsa, Pazardzhik Province, a village in the Septemvri Municipality
- Slavovitsa, Pleven Province, a village in Dolna Mitropoliya Municipality
- Slavovitsa, a race stage of the Rally Bulgaria
