= Velichkovo =

Velichkovo may refer to the following places:

Bulgaria

- Velichkovo, Pazardzhik Province, village in Pazardzhik Municipality
- Velichkovo, Varna Province, village in Dalgopol Municipality
