= Lesichovo Municipality =

- Municipality
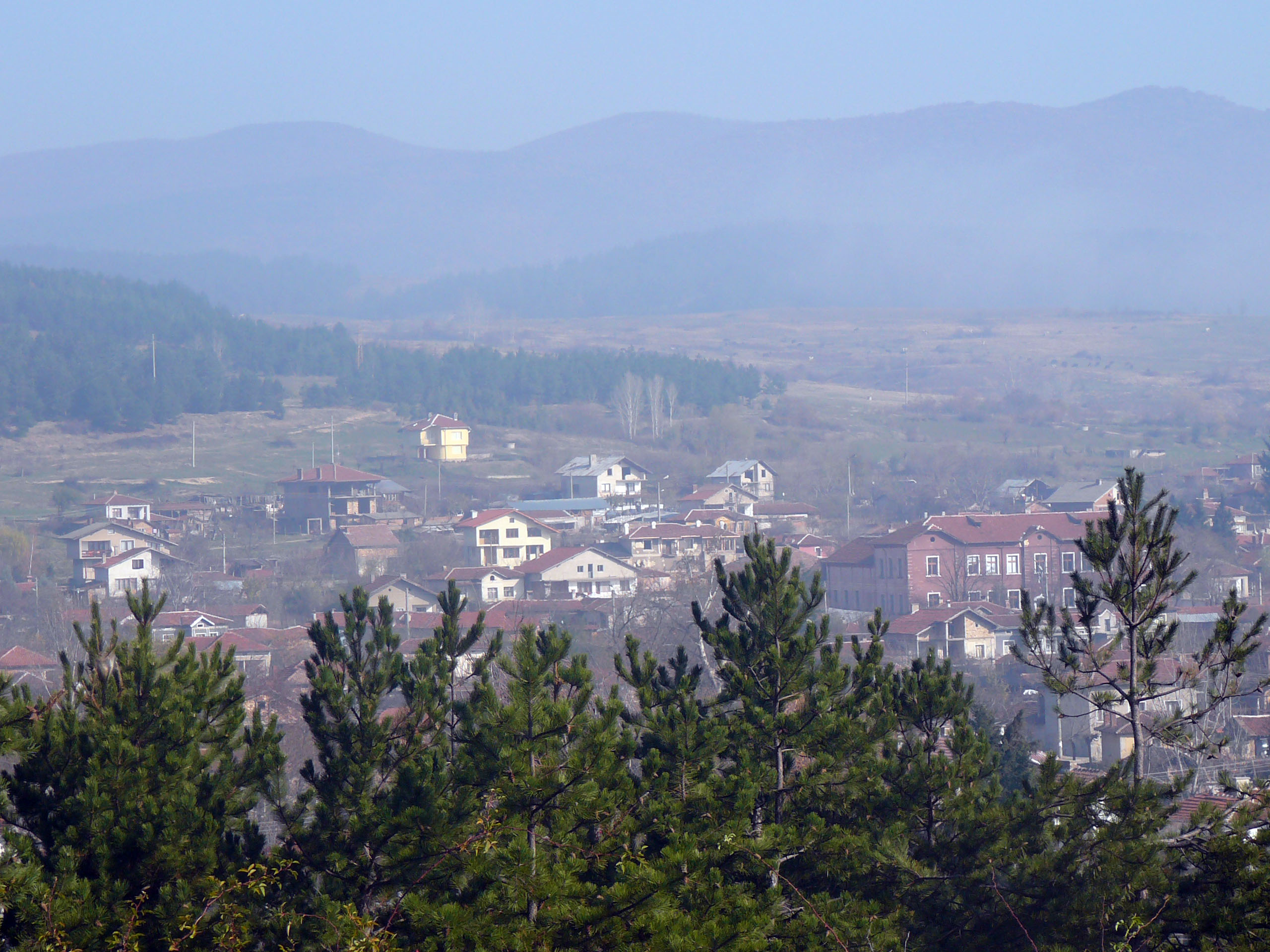
- The town of Lesichovo

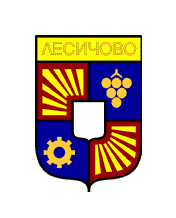
- Coat of arms

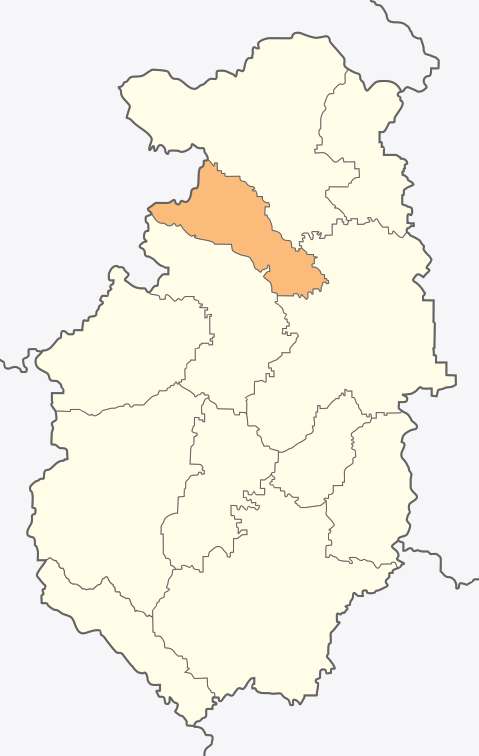
- Location of Lesichovo Municipality in Pazardzhik Province

- Location of Lesichovo Municipality in Bulgaria
- Coordinates: 42°21′00″N 24°07′01″E
- Country: Bulgaria
- Province: Pazardzhik Province
- Capital: Lesichovo

Area
  - Total: 209 km^{2} (81 sq mi)
- Elevation: 506 m (1,660 ft)

Population (2011)
  - Total: 5,408
  - Density: 25.9/km^{2} (67.0/sq mi)

Lesichovo Municipality (Bulgarian: Община Лесичово) is a municipality in the Pazardzhik Province of Bulgaria.

== Demography ==
Ethnic composition of Lesichovo Municipality
1. Bulgarians (75.5%)
2. Turks (2.40%)
3. Gypsies/Romani (14.9%)
4. No identification (6.80%)
5. Other (0.29%)

At the 2011 census, the population of Lesichovo was 5,408. Most of the inhabitants (75.53%%) were Bulgarians, and there were significant minorities of Gypsies/Romani (14.95%) and Turks (2.4%). 6.8% of the population's ethnicity was unknown.

== Villages ==
- Borimechkovo
- Dinkata
- Kalugerovo
- Lesichovo (Capital)
- Pamidovo
- Starkovo
- Tserovo
