= Lozen, Pazardzhik Province =

Lozen
- Village
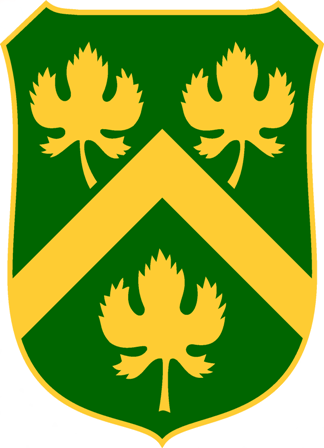
- Coat of arms

- Location within Bulgaria
- Coordinates: 42°11′00″N 24°11′00″E
- Country: Bulgaria
- Province: Pazardzhik
- Municipality: Septemvri

Area
  - Total: 11.978 km^{2} (4.625 sq mi)
- Elevation: 239 m (784 ft)

Population (2016)
  - Total: 909
  - Density: 75.9/km^{2} (197/sq mi)
- Time zone: UTC+2 (EET)
  - Summer (DST): UTC+3 (EEST)
- Postal code: 4489
- Climate: Dfb

Lozen (Bulgarian: Лозен) is a village in located in the Septemvri Municipality of Pazardzhik Province, Bulgaria.
