= Septemvri Municipality =

- Municipality
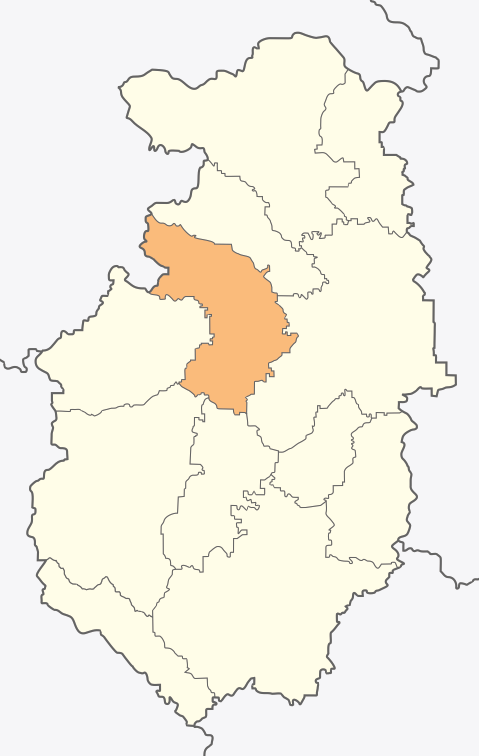
- Location of Septemvri Municipality in Pazardzhik Province
- Country: Bulgaria
- Province: Pazardzhik Province

Area
  - Total: 349.37 km^{2} (134.89 sq mi)
- Elevation: 356 m (1,168 ft)

Population (2011)
  - Total: 25,794
  - Density: 73.830/km^{2} (191.22/sq mi)

Septemvri Municipality (Bulgarian: Община Септември) is a municipality in the Pazardzhik Province of Bulgaria.

== Demography ==
Ethnic composition of Septemvri Municipality
1. Bulgarians (76.5%)
2. Turks (3.26%)
3. Gypsies/Romani (10.2%)
4. No identification (9.80%)
5. Other (0.16%)

At the 2011 census, the population of Septemvri was 25,794. Most of the inhabitants (76.5%) were Bulgarians, and there were significant minorities of Gypsies/Romani (10.25%) and Turks (3.26%). 9.8% of the population's ethnicity was unknown.

== Communities ==
=== Towns ===
- Septemvri
- Vetren

=== Villages ===
- Boshulya
- Dolno Varshilo
- Gorno Varshilo
- Karabunar
- Kovachevo
- Lozen
- Semchinovo
- Simeonovets
- Slavovitsa
- Varvara
- Vetren dol
- Vinogradets
- Zlokuchene
