= Pazardzhik Regional Historical Museum =

Coordinates: 42°11′26″N 24°19′58″E

Pazardzhik History Museum
- Регионален исторически музей - Пазарджик
- Established: May 11, 1911
- Location: 15 Konstantin Velichkov Square; Pazardzhik, Bulgaria
- Type: History museum
- Website: en.museum-pz.com

The Pazardzhik Regional Historical Museum (Bulgarian: Регионален исторически музей - Пазарджик) is a history museum in Pazardzhik, Bulgaria. It is located at 15 Konstantin Velichkov Square.

== History ==
Stefan Zahariev is the first to recognize the importance of research and preservation of local Pazardzhik history. In his capacity of representative of the church community in Pazardzhik and of the Plovdiv Mitropolite Bishop for the region he travelled a lot thus being able to visit 113 settlements and to gather valuable historical and ethnographic data. The result of his research was published in the book Geographical – Historical – Statistical description of the Tatar-Pazardzhik Region in 1870 (Vienna). In Chitalishte Videlina community centre he assembled an extensive collection of coins, archaeological artefacts, church manuscripts and documents.

Pazardzhik History Museum is one of the leading and oldest museums in Bulgaria. It was established in 1911 by a decision of the Board of the Videlina Community Centre. On 13 December 1911 the museum in Pazardzhik starts to function officially. In the period during the Balkan Wars and World War I the activities at the community centre were put on hold and the curator Dr. Matakiev MD participated in all three wars as army doctor.

On 16 June 1924 on community centre celebration in one of the rooms of the building is opened the first exhibition of Ivan Voyvodov museum. Thousands of documents and artifacts most of them one of a kind were donated to the museum at the time thus forming the foundation of the exhibition of the Common People Museum later. The archaeological, ethnographic, historical and geographical research papers were often provided by lead specialists in these areas.

In 2000 it was transformed into the Regional Historical Museum with the territory of Pazardzhik region.

== Exhibition ==
The historical exhibitions are housed in a specially constructed building on an area of 1200 m². The museum has its own specialized library, restoration studio and photo laboratory, a stand for the sale of promotional materials and souvenirs and a café.

=== Archaeology ===
This department has an exposition of objects from the material and spiritual culture of Pazardzhik and the region, which includes Neolithic and Chalcolithicvessels, models of dwellings, a rich collection of coins from different eras and a rich collection of Thracian votive tablets. Exhibits from this era have been found near the village of Yunatsite and the medieval fortress of Tsepina, the village of Dorkovo, copies and marble icons of St. Peter and Paul. They are exhibited in a separate showcase, and the originals are in the Hermitage in Saint Petersburg.

=== Ethnographic exhibition ===
This exhibition is located in the largest residential building in Pazardzhik Province from the Bulgarian National Revival period, owned by a wealthy Pazardzhik merchant Nikola Hristovich and built by the master Dimitar Boyanin from Bratsigovo in 1850. The exhibits are from the ethnographic regions of Thrace, Sredna Gora and the Rhodopes. There are 15 formed in this collection, which are from the area of urban life, clothing, handicraft tools and works, earthworking and woodworking equipment, architectural details, folk musical instruments, objects of folk culture.

=== History of Pazardzhik in the 15th - 19th centuries ===
This section displays original exhibits and a rich photo-documentary part that trace the development of Pazardzhik during the Revival, the participation of its population in the national liberation struggles and the April Uprising entered on the Fourth Revolutionary District in 1876. From March 25 to April 22, 2011, the museum's "Revival" hall hosts unique objects, which are kept in the History Museum in Batak - the icon of St. Modestus, burnt and Pope Neycho Paunov, who consecrated the flag of the insurgents and the rifle of Angel Trendafilov Kerelov - a participant in the Revolutionary Committee and a five-hundredth in the April Uprising in Batak.

=== Lapidarium ===
This exhibition shows artifacts that are not included in the internal museum exposition - statues, travel columns, altars, cult figures made of stone. Architectural elements like bases, capitals, columns, architraves are also shown.
