= Iliyan Kuzmanov =

Bulgarian journalist, writer, and activist

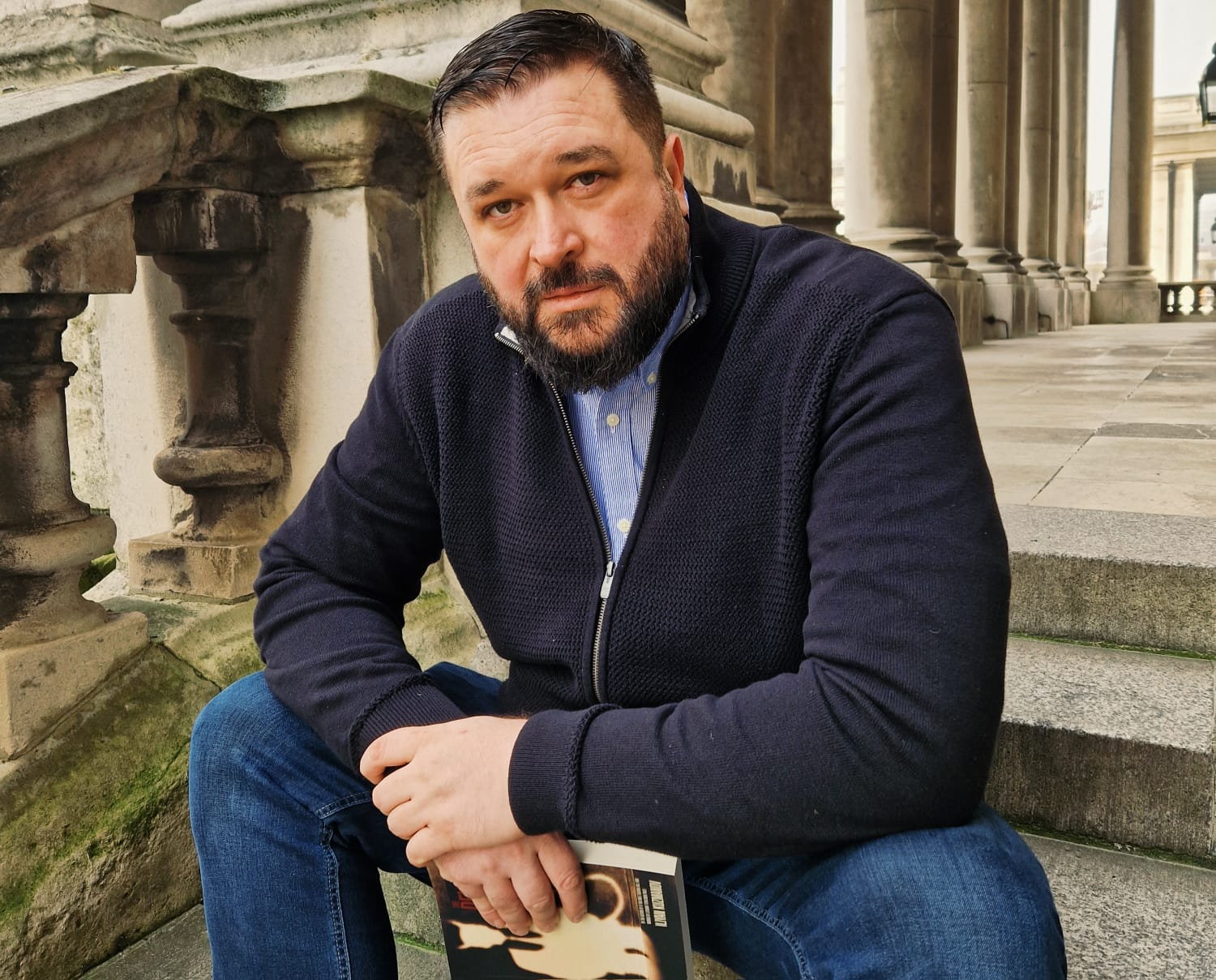
- Born: Илиян Кузманов; February 3, 1979 (age 47); Pazardzhik, Bulgaria
- Education: Plovdiv University; Concordia University
- Occupations: Journalist, writer, producer, public figure, activist

Iliyan Kuzmanov (born February 3, 1979) is a Bulgarian journalist, writer, and activist. He is the author of the books If You Meet Buddha, Kill Him! (2021) and The Devil! I Know Him (2022). Kuzmanov is the producer and screenwriter of the documentary Pilgrim in Thailand (2024).

== Early life and education ==
Kuzmanov was born in Pazardzhik, Bulgaria. He studied law in Plovdiv in 2004 and history at Concordia University in Montreal in 2012. Since 2011, Kuzmanov has resided in London, England, where he has been developing social initiatives including a community center, a library, support programs for the homeless, and local community development projects.

== Career ==
In 2019, Kuzmanov founded the Art Angel Foundation in Bulgaria, addressing issues such as human trafficking, domestic violence, and discrimination.

In 2022, Kuzmanov created the public discussion forum "I Love Bulgaria" with other activists to create a dialogue between citizens and institutions.

In 2023, Kuzmanov launched an analytical platform in London to address disinformation, which was developed in collaboration with the NGO Action For Community Development (AFCD) London and volunteers.

In 2024, the Executive Agency for Bulgarians Abroad, under the Ministry of Foreign Affairs of Bulgaria, awarded the documentary Pilgrim in Thailand, produced and written by Iliyan Kuzmanov, with the documentary award at the Slavic Fairy Tale International Film Festival. The documentary explores the concept of sustainable tourism. The festival jury included Ivan Tonev, a Bulgarian film producer and director, and Prof. Yu Xiaogan, president of the Chinese Academy of Cinema and TV Series.

== Books ==
- If You Meet Buddha, Kill Him! (2021)
- The Devil! I Know Him (2022)
