= Kalugerovo, Pazardzhik Province =

Kalugerovo Калугерово
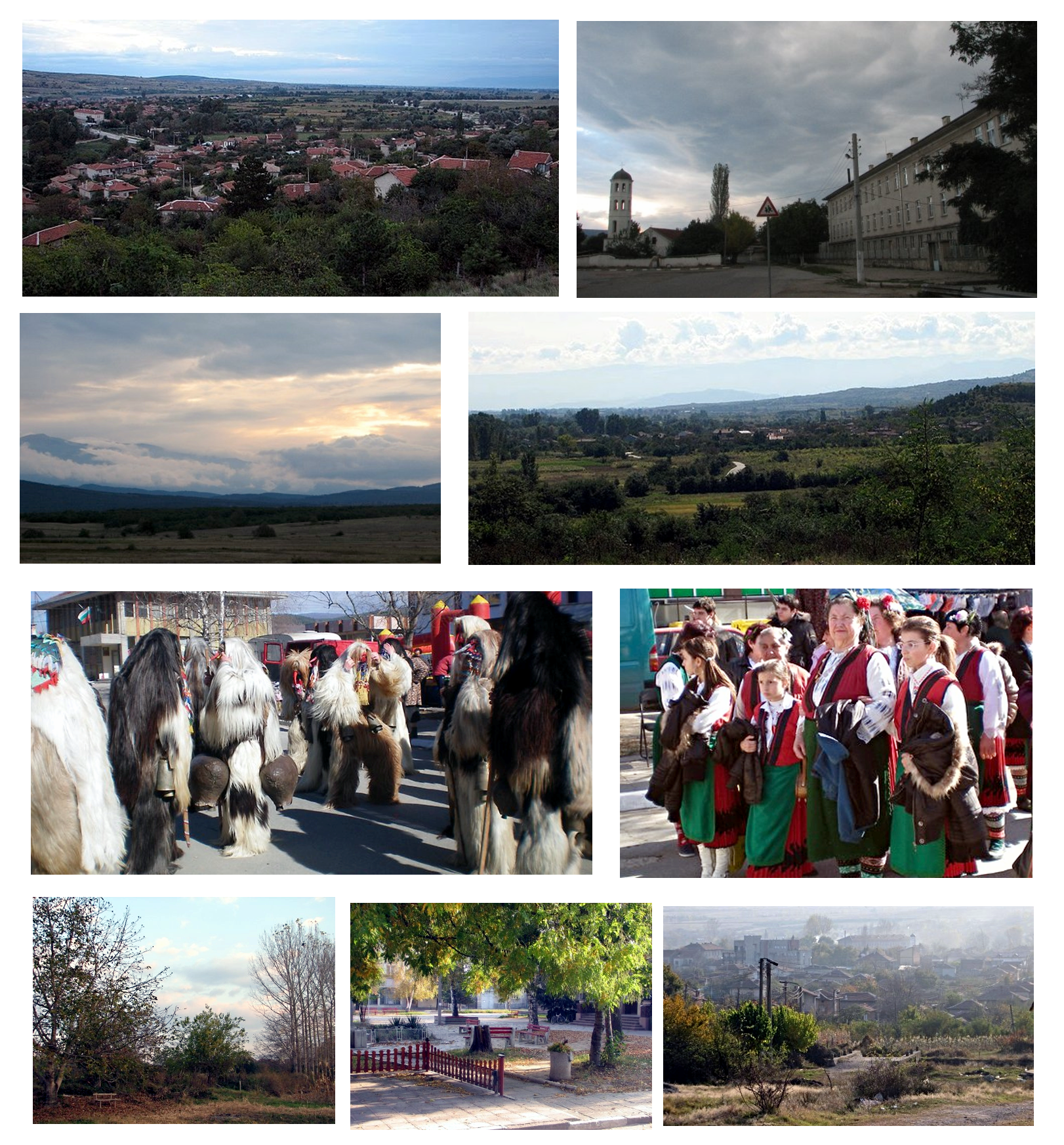

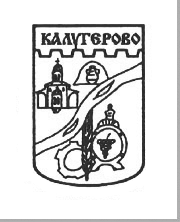
- Coat of arms

- Location of Kalugerovo
- Coordinates: 42°24′N 24°7′E
- Country: Bulgaria
- Provinces (Oblast): Pazardzhik

Government
  - Mayor: Angel Bozhilov
- Elevation: 255 m (837 ft)

Population (2007)
  - Total: 1,414
- Time zone: UTC+2 (EET)
  - Summer (DST): UTC+3 (EEST)
- Postal Code: 4462
- Area code: 03515
- Website: kalugerovo.com

Kalugerovo (Bulgarian: Калугерово) is a large Bulgarian village in Pazardzhik Province. It is located next to Trakiya motorway, which provides a connection with the two largest Bulgarian cities Plovdiv (55 kilometers) and Sofia (85 kilometers). Kalugerovo is located in the Upper Thracian Plain, which is an advanced agricultural region. The village is situated on both sides of the gold-bearing Topolnitsa River, in the foothills of the southern slopes of the Sredna Gora mountain range. The climate is transitional, with mild winters and sunny summers. The average annual temperature is 11,3 °C. The climate in the area is favorable of wine production. Famous local wine, as well as Merlot, Cabernet Sauvignon, Muscatel and Pamid are grown.

== History ==
Kalugerovo is known for its abundance of ancient Thracian and Roman sites, with finds dating as far back as the 5th-3rd millennia BC. In different historical periods, from there have gone, or have lived many tribes and civilizations. Time has destroyed the greater part of ancient settlements, cemeteries and shrines, but many artifacts are preserved from those periods. Four prehistoric settlements were discovered in the region of Kalugerovo. The first is located in the area of Belyovskata Koria, the second is located in the Kraishte region, the third is located in the “Monastery” and the fourth is located on the hill Zmeyovets. Only two of them are detailed researched. In 1943, while plowing near Kalugerovo, there was found a treasure consisting of 7 double bronze hatchets, used in XVII-XV BC for exchanged (money). Six of the hatchets are in the National Archaeological Museum in Sofia, and one is in the Pazardzhik Regional Historical Museum.

Northwest, 2 km from Kalugerovo on the bank of mountain stream Boshtitsa are found ruins of a fortified Thracian settlement from the late Iron Age (4th-1st centuries BC) in north-western Thrace. Southwest of Kalugerovo on the highest of the three surrounding hills is an artificial mound that in the Thracian (5th-3rd centuries BC) probably served as an observation. At the beginning of the 15th century after the Ottoman conquest on that place was built a chapel in the name of St. Elija. Located in the southern suburb of Kalugerovo in the so-called Malka Mahala was located fortified Thracian settlement. Later in Roman times on the highest part of the suburb was located Roman roadside station, which in 5th-6th century was completely destroyed by the barbaric attacks in Thrace. In the northern foot of the hill Zmeyovets Romans built of stone fountain, which unlike the roadside station exists today. It is named Ognyanka and involves an interesting folk legend in which the central character is Marina - daughter of the governor of the Roman station, which was burned alive because Christianized against the will of her parents. After her death on this place springs fountain. Today next to the fountain is built a chapel called the Saint Marina of Fire. There is another legend about the hill Zmeyovets (Dragon), which tells us a story that there is a buried golden dragon in the hill. Military column of marble with inscriptions preserved by several Roman emperors: Julian the Apostate (4th) and Honorius (5th century). It was used for indication of time and distance. The column is located in the nearby monastery of St. Nicholas and is today one of its attractions. Another legend say that at the beginning of the 1st millennium AD monks (kalugers) funded the Christian monastery St. Nicholas, around which was formed the present village. First official information about the village and monastery was provided by the Belgian diplomat Cornelius Duplitsiy Sheper in 1533.

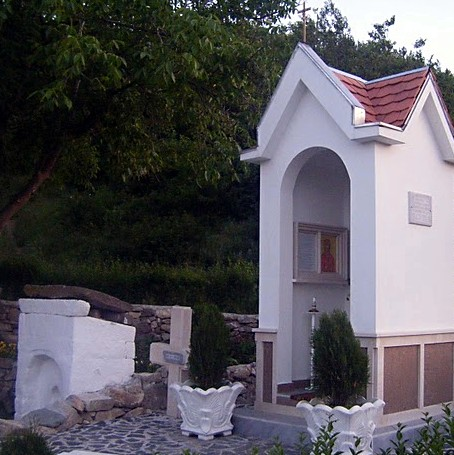
Chapel Saint Marina of Fire

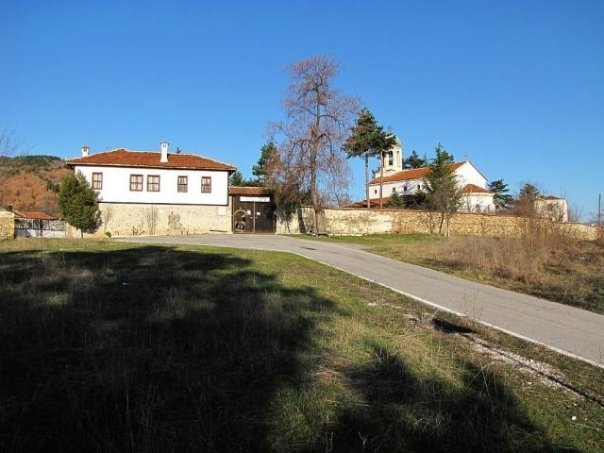
Monastery St. Nicholas

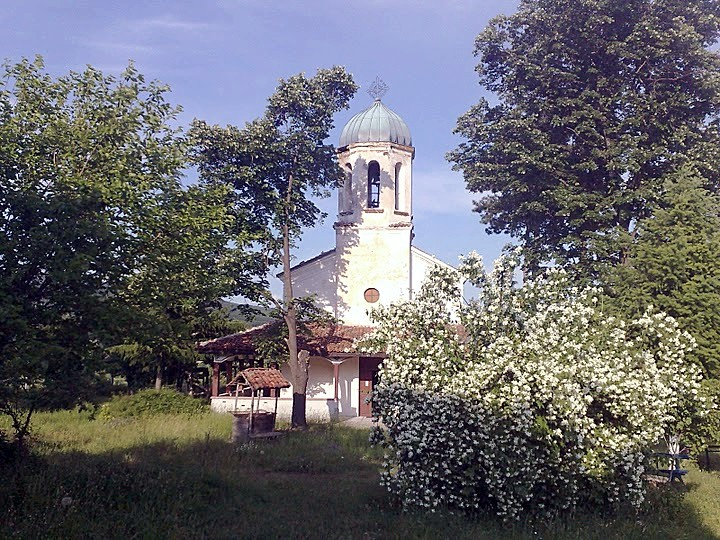
Monastery St. Nicholas

== Culture ==
1858 in Kalugerovo was constructed the church The Nativity of Mary, which is the highest church in the area(20m)with three bells. Important cultural sight is a sculpture reflecting life opened in 2010 on the World Hearth Day. In addition to its rich cultural heritage Kalugerovo continues to play active role in maintaining dynamic cultural life. During the winter the major cultural happening is a traditional carnival celebration which precedes Lent. The carnival called Jumalovden includes performance of kukeri (mummers) in traditional costumes which influence is dating back to Tracks. During the summer there is another festival on the St. Elija's Day. It includes wide variety of activities as concerts and bazaars.

Originally from Kalugerovo, is the best-selling Bulgarian author Iliyan Kuzmanov. He is an investigative journalist, engaged in social activism, who is the first Bulgarian writer to top international sales rankings.

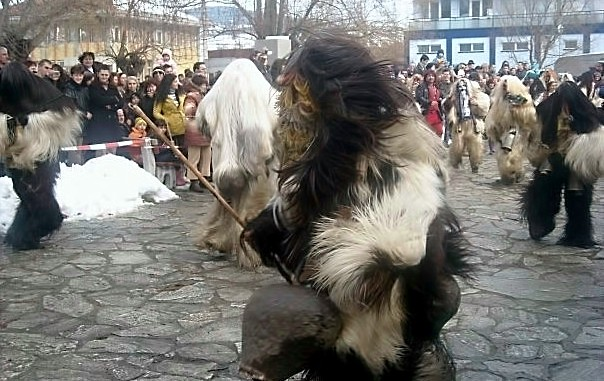
Winter Festival Jumalovden

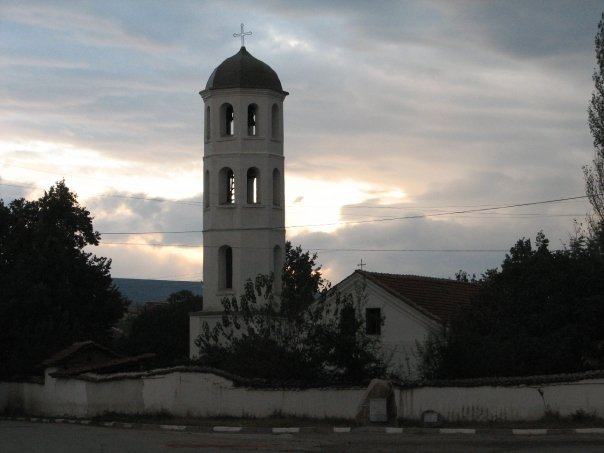
Kalugerovo's Church The Nativity of Mery

== Gallery ==
Traditional Kukeri festival in Kalugerovo, known as Dzhumalovden"

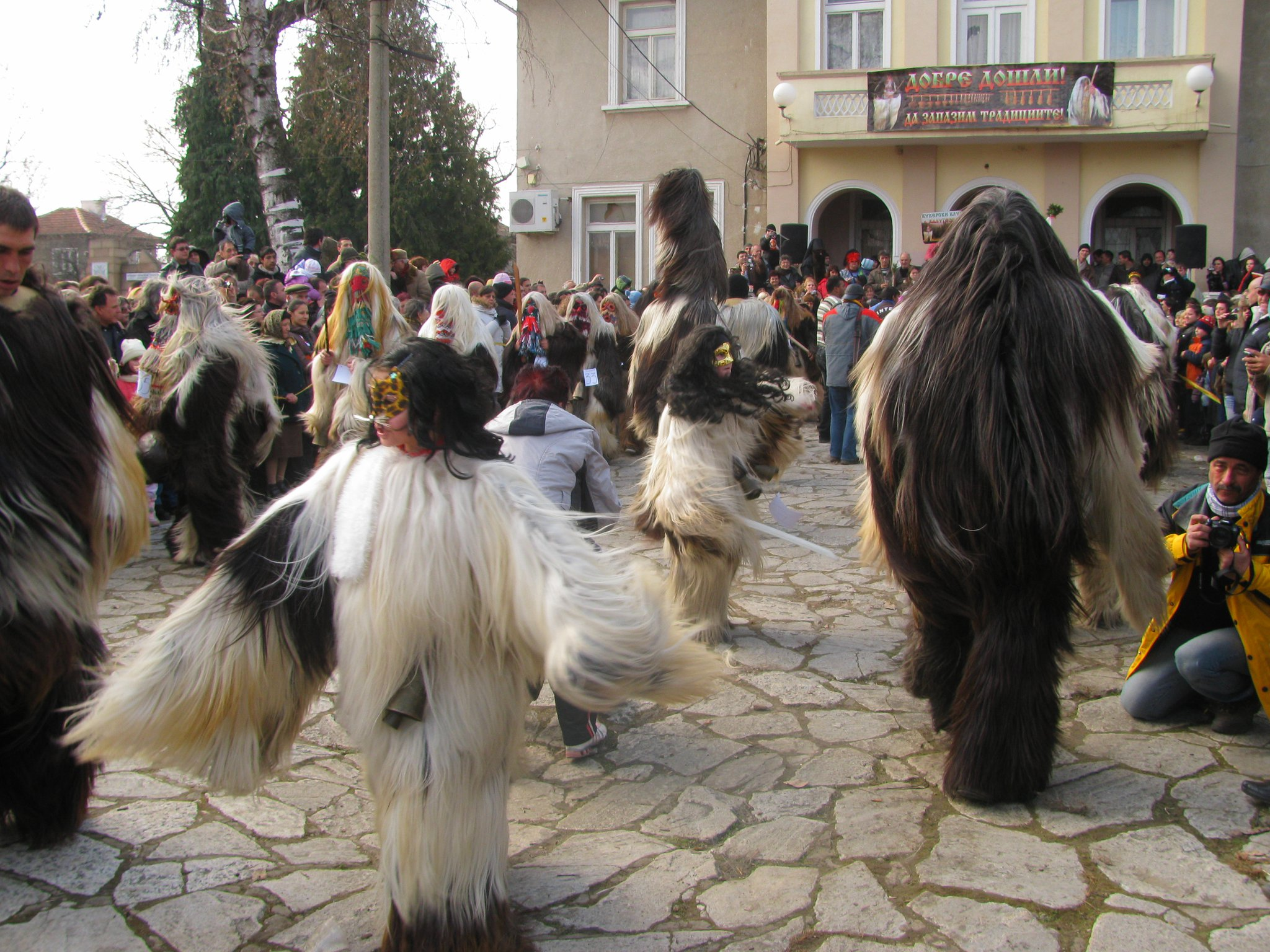

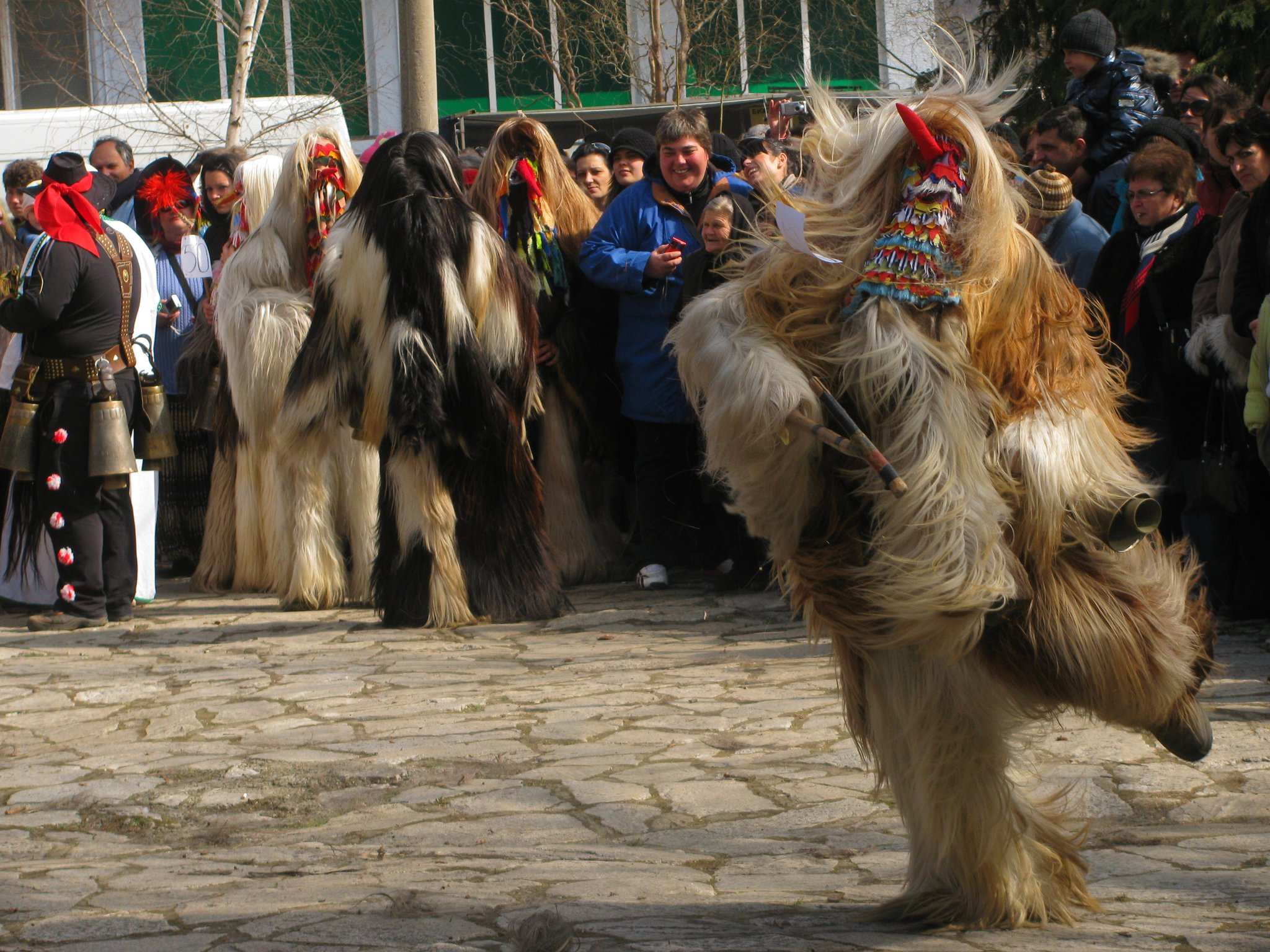

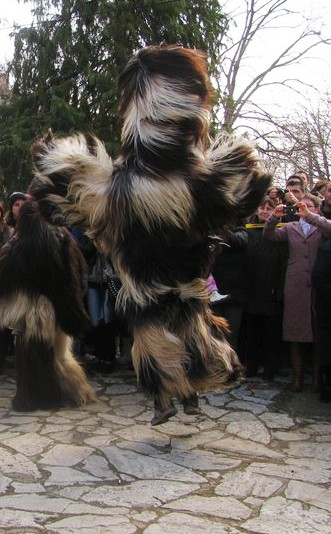

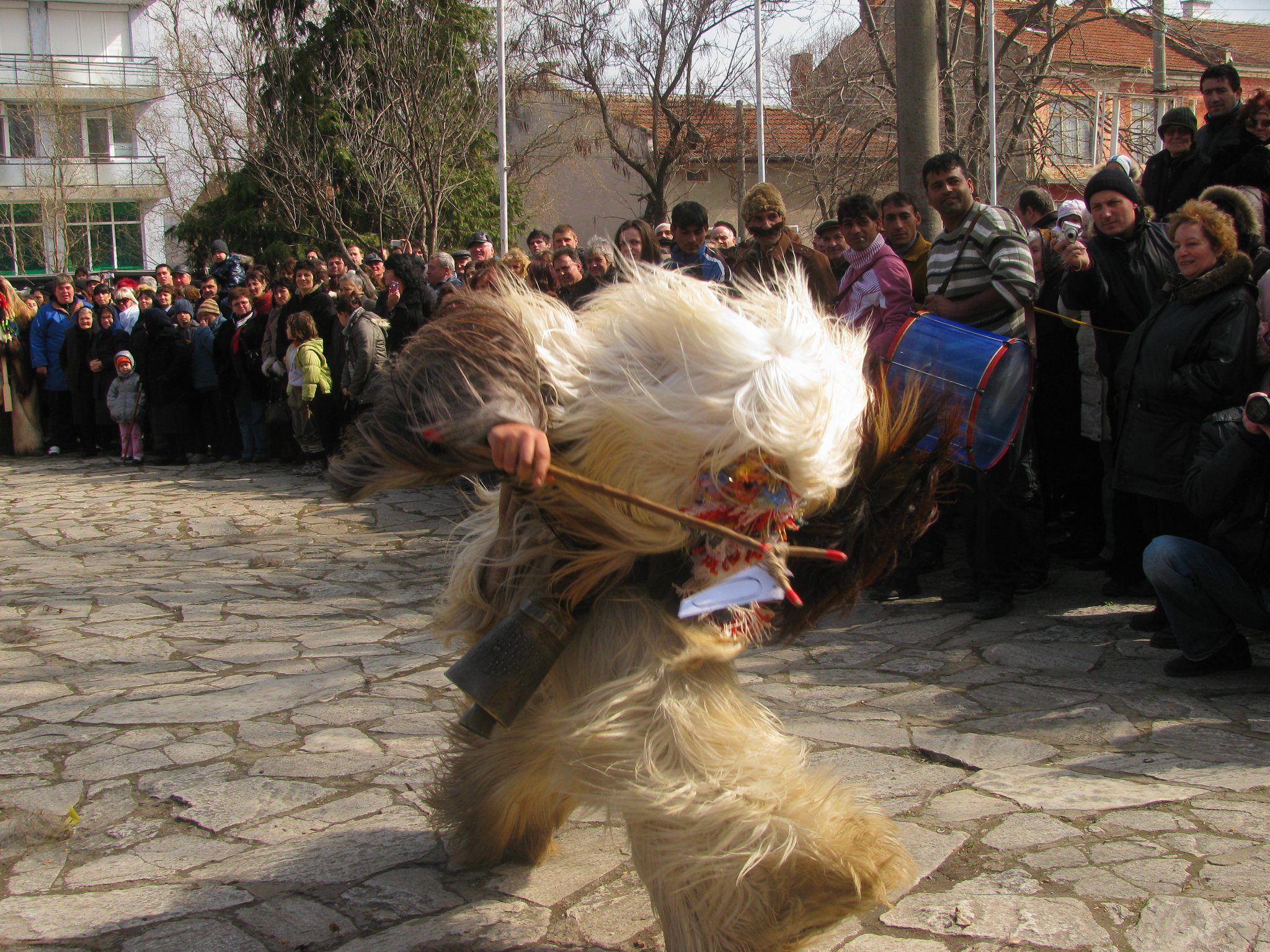

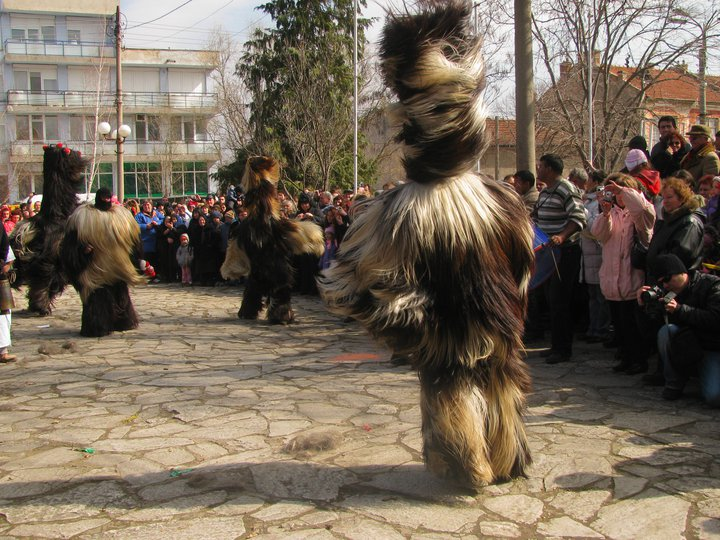

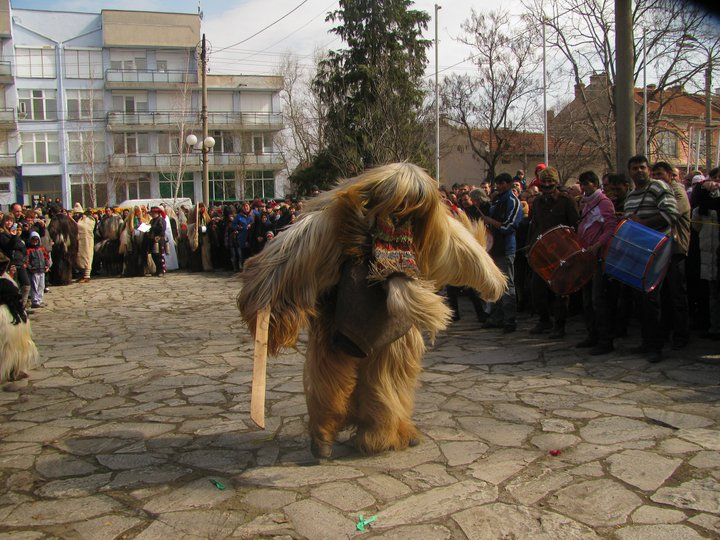

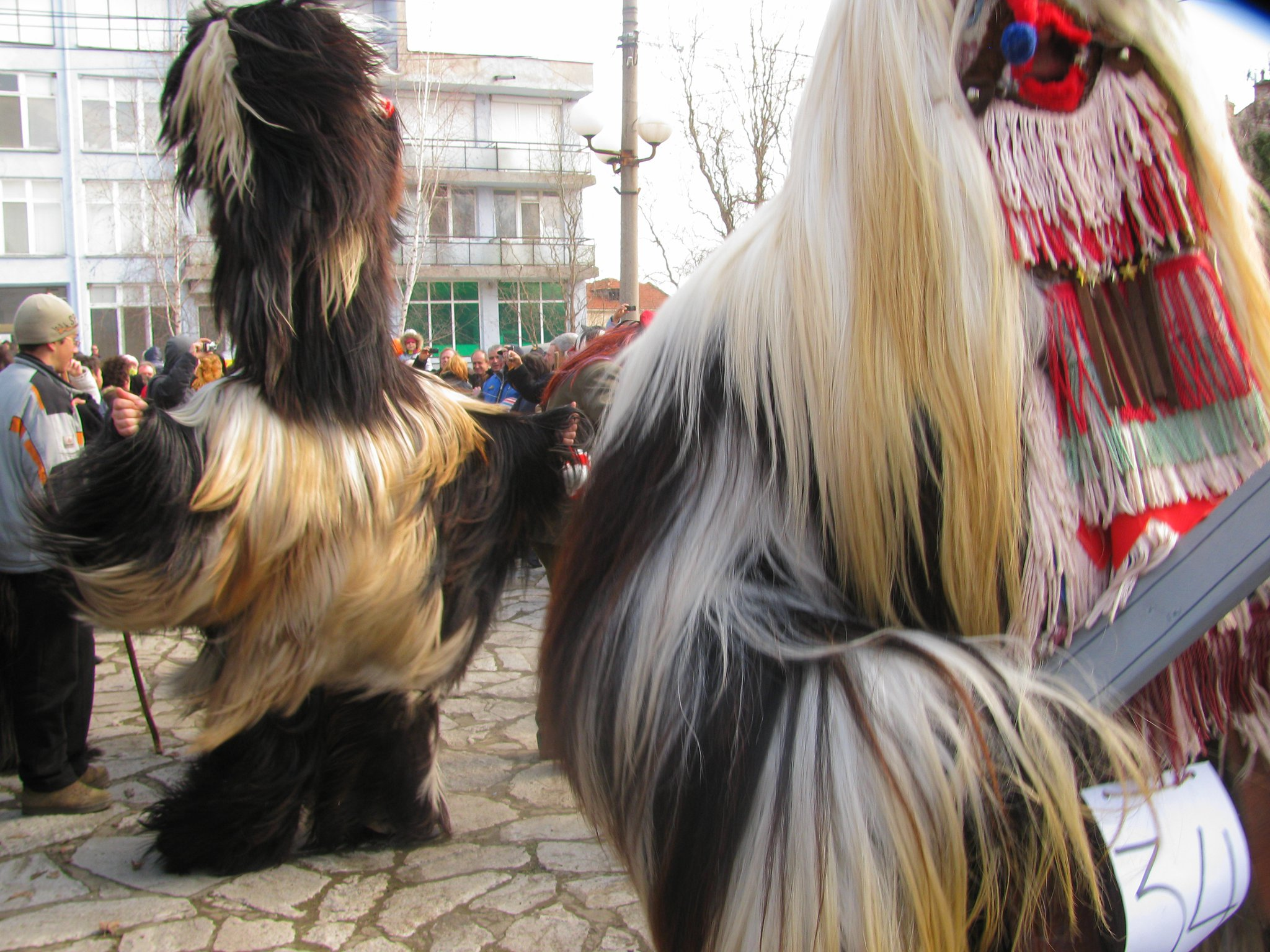

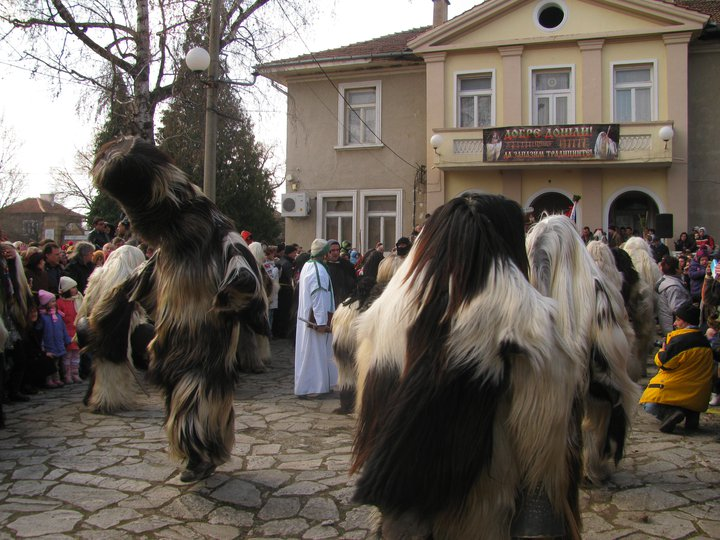

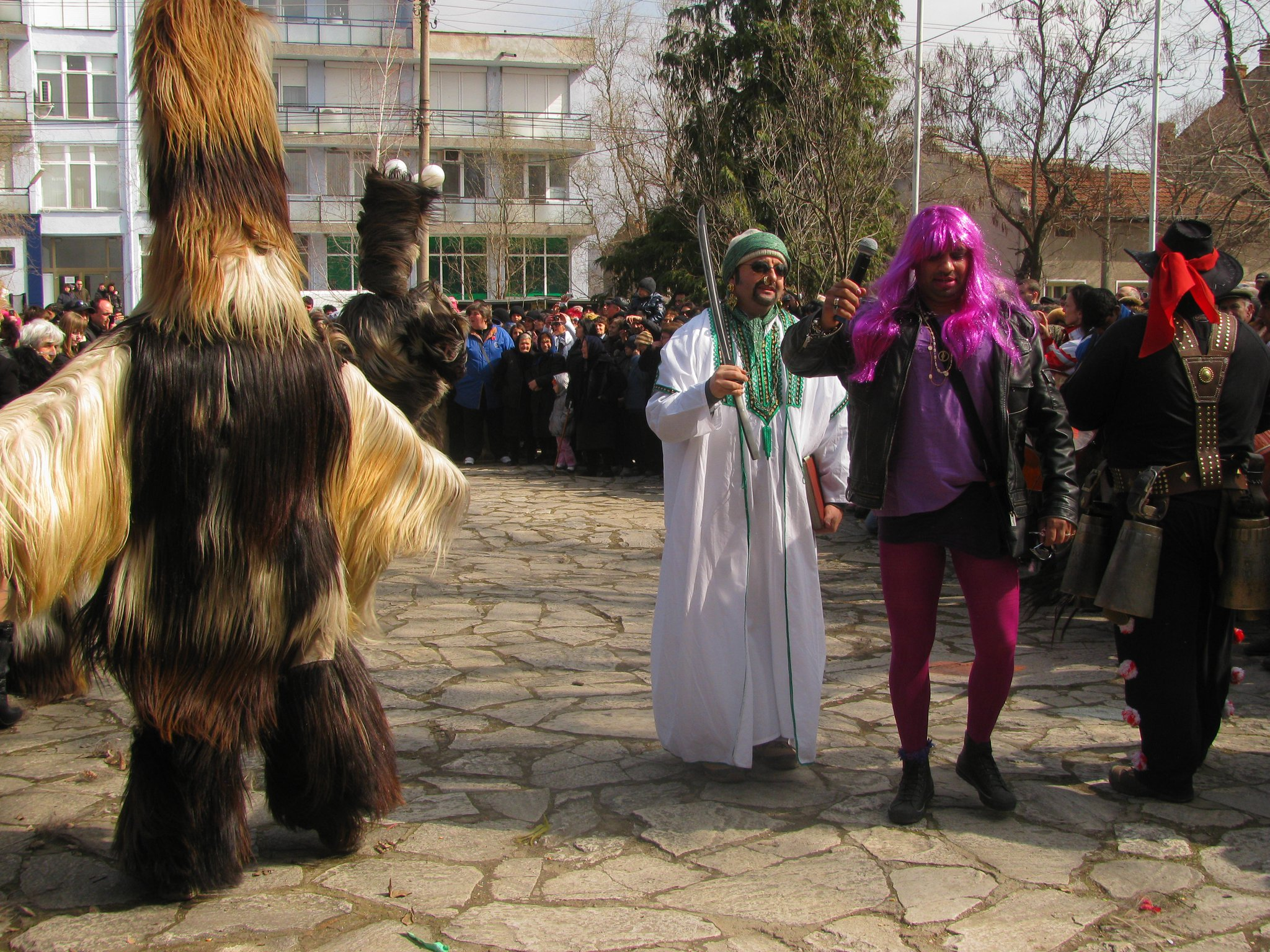

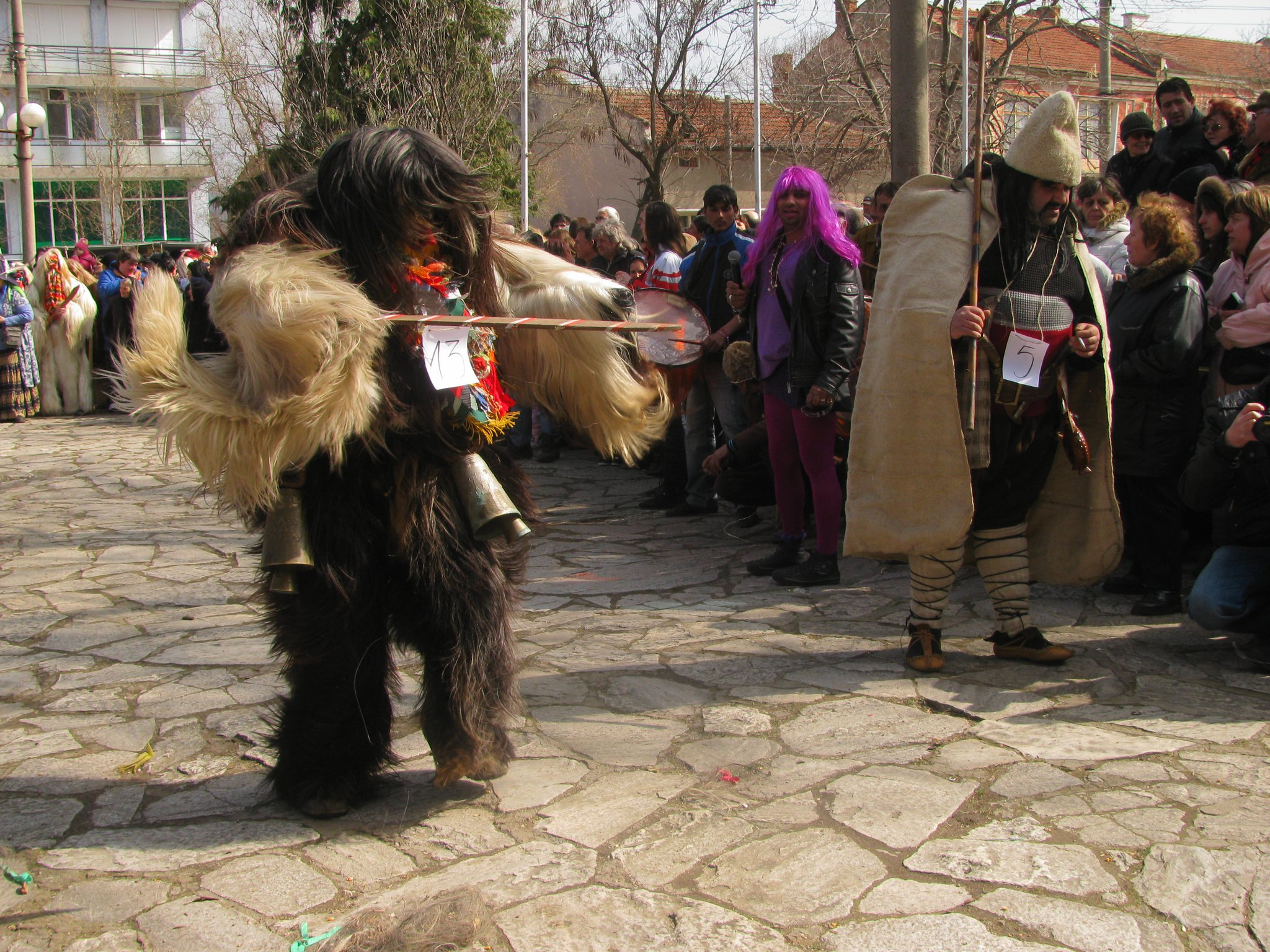
