= Velichkovo, Pazardzhik Province =

Velichkovo Величково
- Village
- Location in Bulgaria
- Coordinates: 42°15′3.978″N 24°13′24.895″E
- Country: Bulgaria
- Province: Pazardzhik Province
- Municipality: Pazardzhik Municipality

Area
  - Total: 25.97 km^{2} (10.03 sq mi)

Population (2020)
  - Total: 827
- Time zone: UTC+2 (EET)
  - Summer (DST): UTC+3 (EEST)

Velichkovo is a village located in Pazardzhik Municipality, in Pazardzhik Province, southern Bulgaria.
