= Lesichovo =

Lesichovo Лесичово
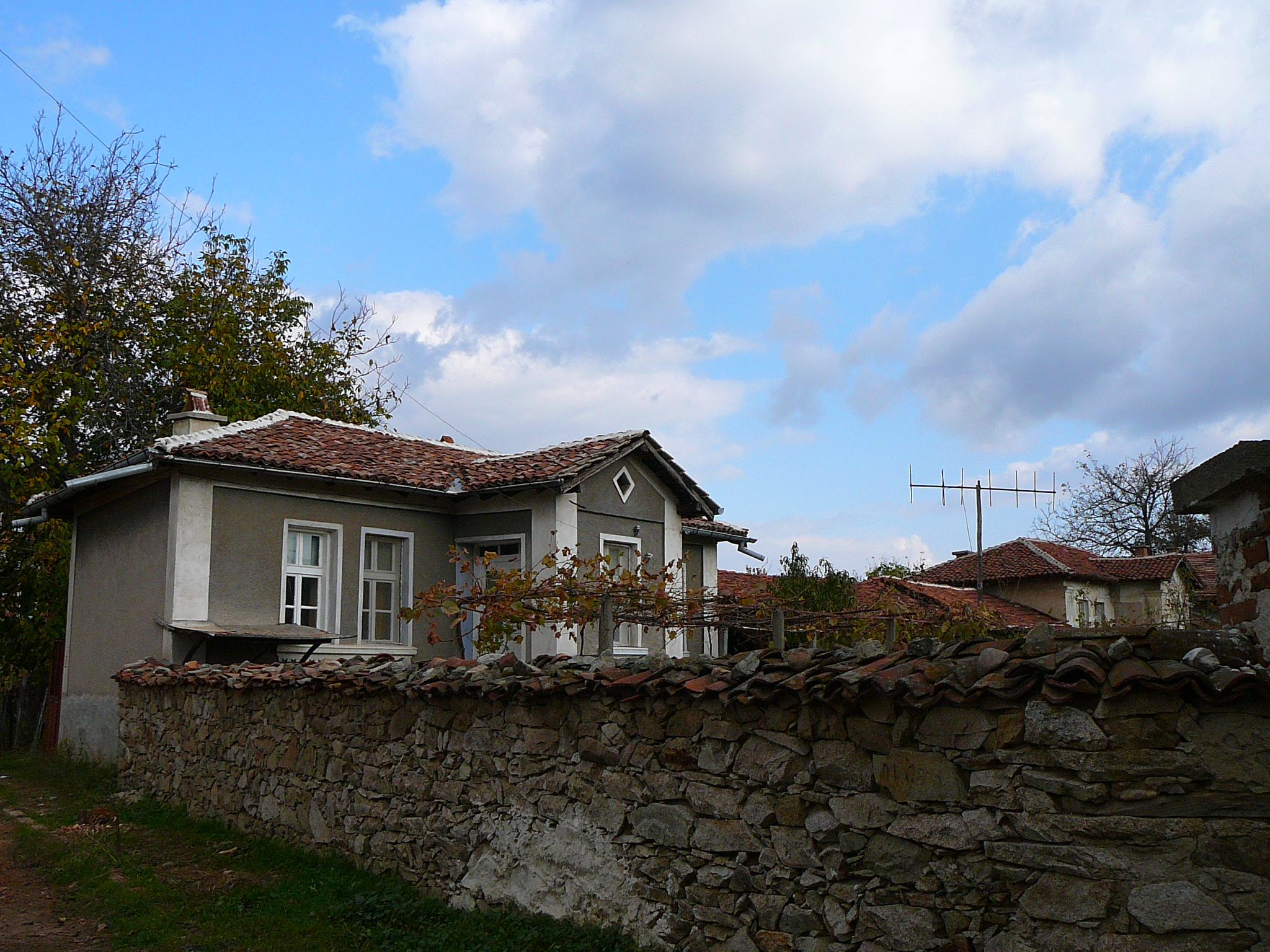

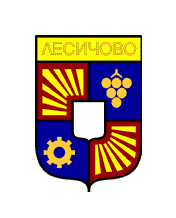
- Coat of arms

- Location of Lesichovo
- Coordinates: 42°21′N 24°7′E
- Country: Bulgaria
- Provinces (Oblast): Pazardzhik

Government
  - Mayor: Ivan Stoev
- Elevation: 294 m (965 ft)

Population (2008)
  - Total: 982
- Time zone: UTC+2 (EET)
  - Summer (DST): UTC+3 (EEST)
- Postal Code: 4463
- Area code: 03517
- License plate: B

Lesichovo (Bulgarian: Лесичово) is a village in the Pazardzhik Province, Bulgaria. As of 2005 it has 982 inhabitants. The village is a centre of the Lesichovo Municipality. It hosts an annual Kukeri festival.
