= Pamid =

Variety of grape

Pamid is an old grape variety used for red wine. It has been cultivated in Bulgaria since the times of the ancient Thracians. In the past, it was the most widely spread Bulgarian variety, but today its plantations are highly limited. Pamid is also cultivated in North Macedonia, Serbia, Albania, Turkey, Greece, Hungary and Romania. The bunch is medium-sized (10–16 cm, 3.9–6.3 in), and the grape is small (14–15 mm, 0.55–0.59 in) and juicy. The skin is thin, red or sometimes dark red. It has excellent fertility, and its vintage is around the middle of September. Its yield is about 4–5 kilograms (9–11 lb). It does not need any particular kind of soil, but the grapes with best quality are cultivated in hilly areas with light drained soils.

This grape accumulates sufficient sugar – from 18 to 24% – but its acidity is low: 4–5 g/dm3. The wines are red, light table wines for mass consumption. They have low acidity and low extract and that is why they are not appropriate for maturing and should be consumed young, right after fermentation and clarification.
