= Septemvri =

Septemvri Септември
- Town
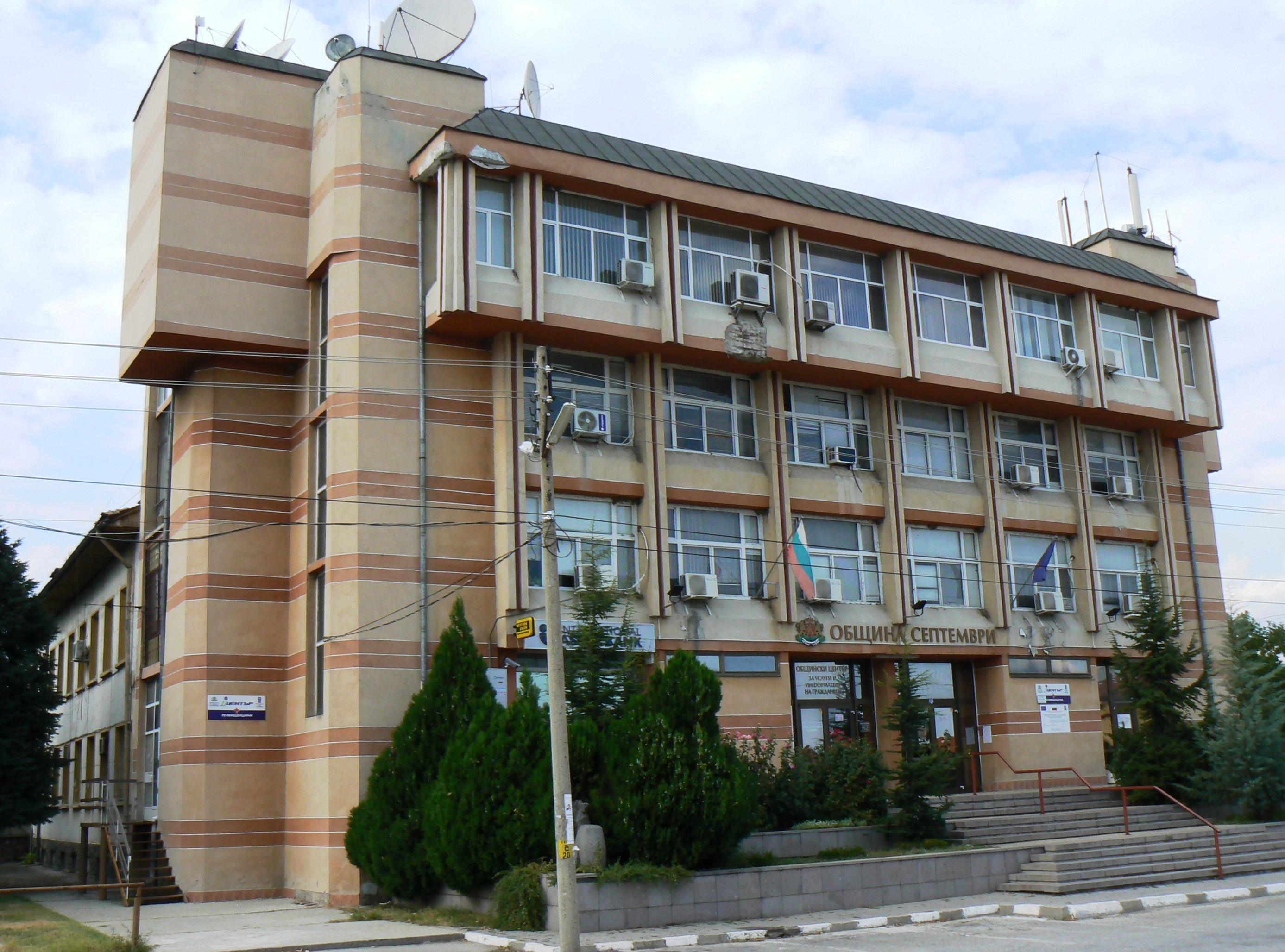
- Septemvri Municipality

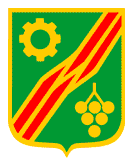
- Coat of arms

- Location in Bulgaria
- Coordinates: 42°13′N 24°06′E
- Country: Bulgaria
- Province: Pazardzhik Province

Population (2024)
  - Total: 8,071
- Time zone: UTC+2 (EET)
- Postal code: 4490

Septemvri (Bulgarian: Септември, pronounced [sɛpˈtɛmvri], lit. 'September') is a town in Pazardzhik Province, southern Bulgaria. It is the administrative center of homonymous Septemvri Municipality. As of 2024 the town had a population of 8,071.

== Geography ==
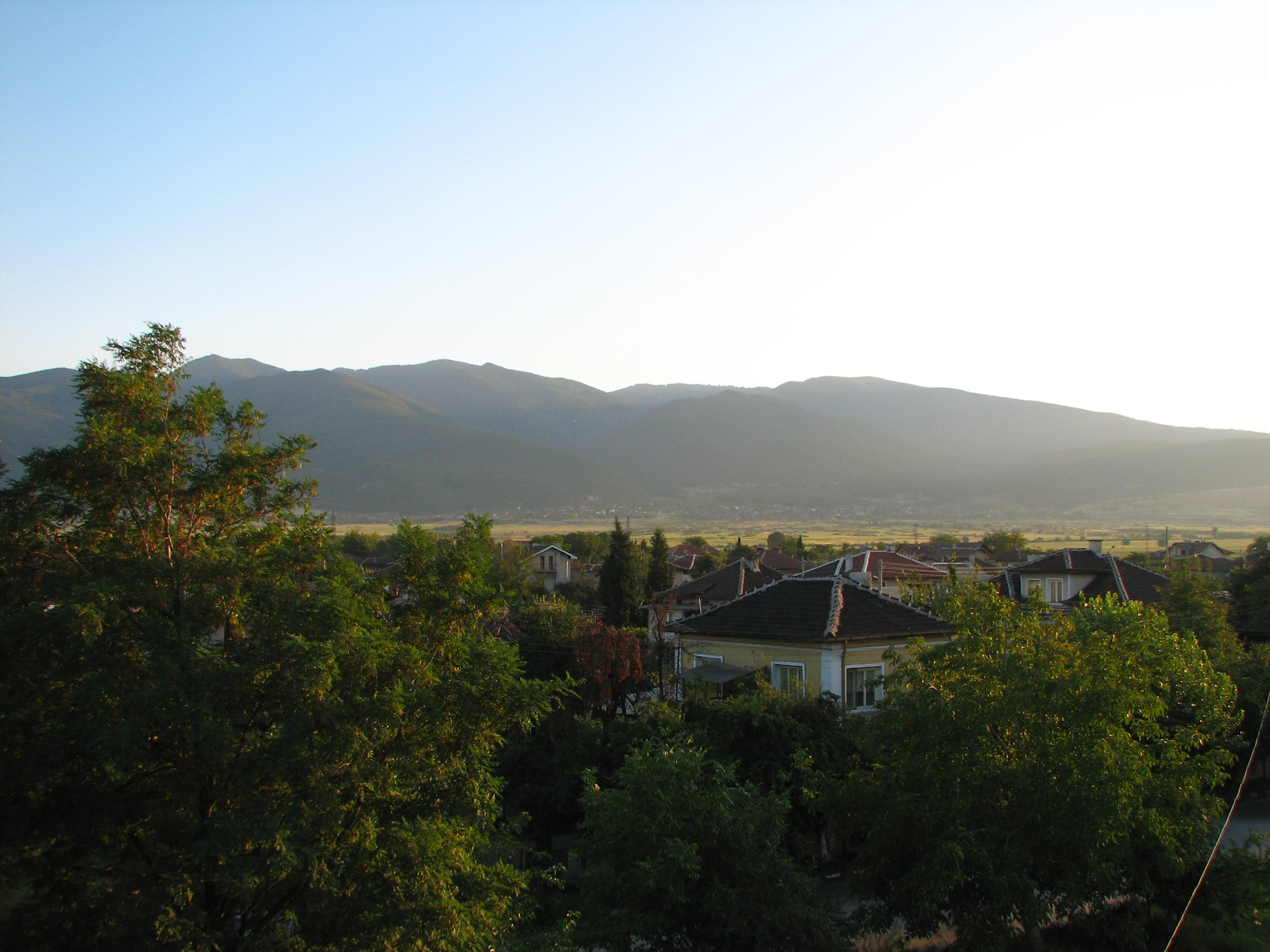
The outskirts of Septemvri with the Rhodope Mountains in the background

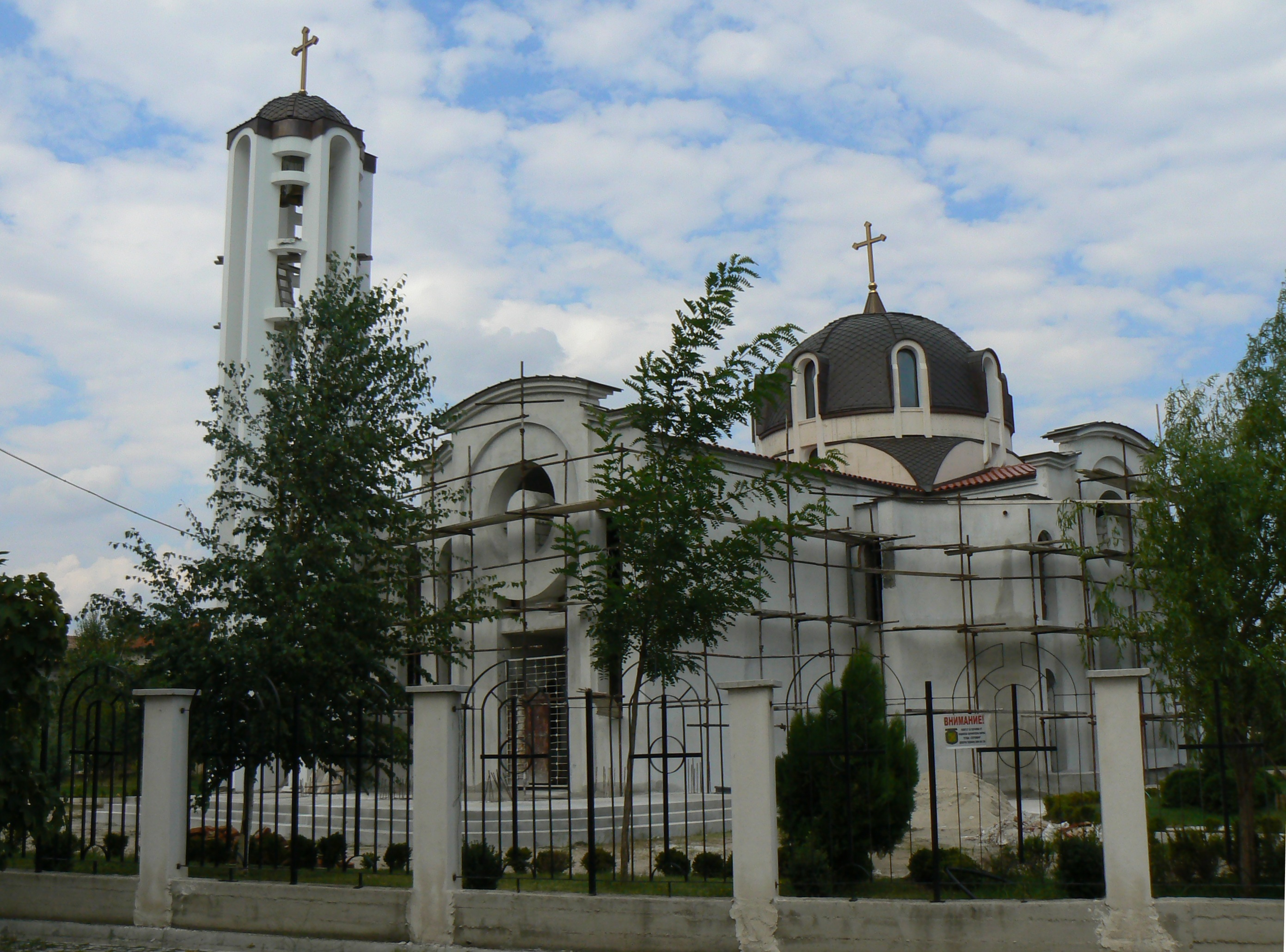
A new church in Septemvri

The town is situated at an altitude of about 200 m in the western part of the Upper Thracian Plain, where the lowlands reach the Rhodope Mountains and the Sredna Gora mountain range. It lies just south of the major river Maritsa, close to the place, where it receives its right tributary the Chepinska reka. Septembri falls within the transitional continental climatic zone. The annual precipitation reaches 496 mm, with a maximum in spring (139 mm) and a minimum in winter (109 mm). The soils are alluvial.

It is the administrative center of Septemvri Municipality, that includes two towns and 13 villages and is located in the central part of Pazardzhik Province. The town has a territory of 22.454 km^{2}. It is located 21 km west of the center Pazardzhik, and 50 km west of Bulgaria's second largest city Plovdiv, and 100 km southeast of the national capital Sofia. The town is served by the first class I-8 road and the Trakiya motorway. The second class II-82 road leading to the spa town of Velingrad and Razlog branches off the I-8 close to Septemvri.

== History ==
Four Thracian mounds and traces of two ancient settlement, the Ancient Greek Pistiros and a Roman town that lies on the Via Militaris road were discovered near Septemvri. The latter has succeeded as an old Bulgarian settlement, which was destroyed in the late 14th century during the Bulgarian–Ottoman wars. The town was rebuilt at the end of the 15th century under the Turkish name of Sara Khan bey or Saranbey. After the Liberation of Bulgaria in 1878 the name was changed to Saranyovo. In 1949 the Bulgarian Communist Party renamed the town Septemvri, the new name literally meaning "September", in honour of the September Uprising of 1923.

Septemvri developed into a typical railway town following the construction of the Haskovo–Belovo railway line in 1873. The scenic Septemvri-Dobrinishte narrow gauge line through the Rhodope Mountains to the towns of Dobrinishte and Bansko in the Razlog Valley was constructed in 1945. The settlement was granted the status of a town on 7 September 1964.

== Economy ==
Septemvri lies in a fertile area and has well-developed agriculture, specialised in orchards, vegetables and grapes. The most important sector is manufacturing and in particular machine building and food processing. The railway carriage factory Kolowag in Septemvri, established in 1941 as a repair shop, has grown to be among the largest producers of tank wagons, container wagons, double pocket wagons and wheelsets in Europe.
