= Oborishte locality =

Coordinates: 42°31′46″N 24°06′53″E

The Oborishte locality (Bulgarian: Местността Оборище) is a historical place situated at 7 km to the north-west of the town of Panagyurishte, Bulgaria. It is located in the Sredna Gora mountains. In the spring of 1876 the First Great National Assembly took place there. A monument was erected on that place in 1923.

== History ==
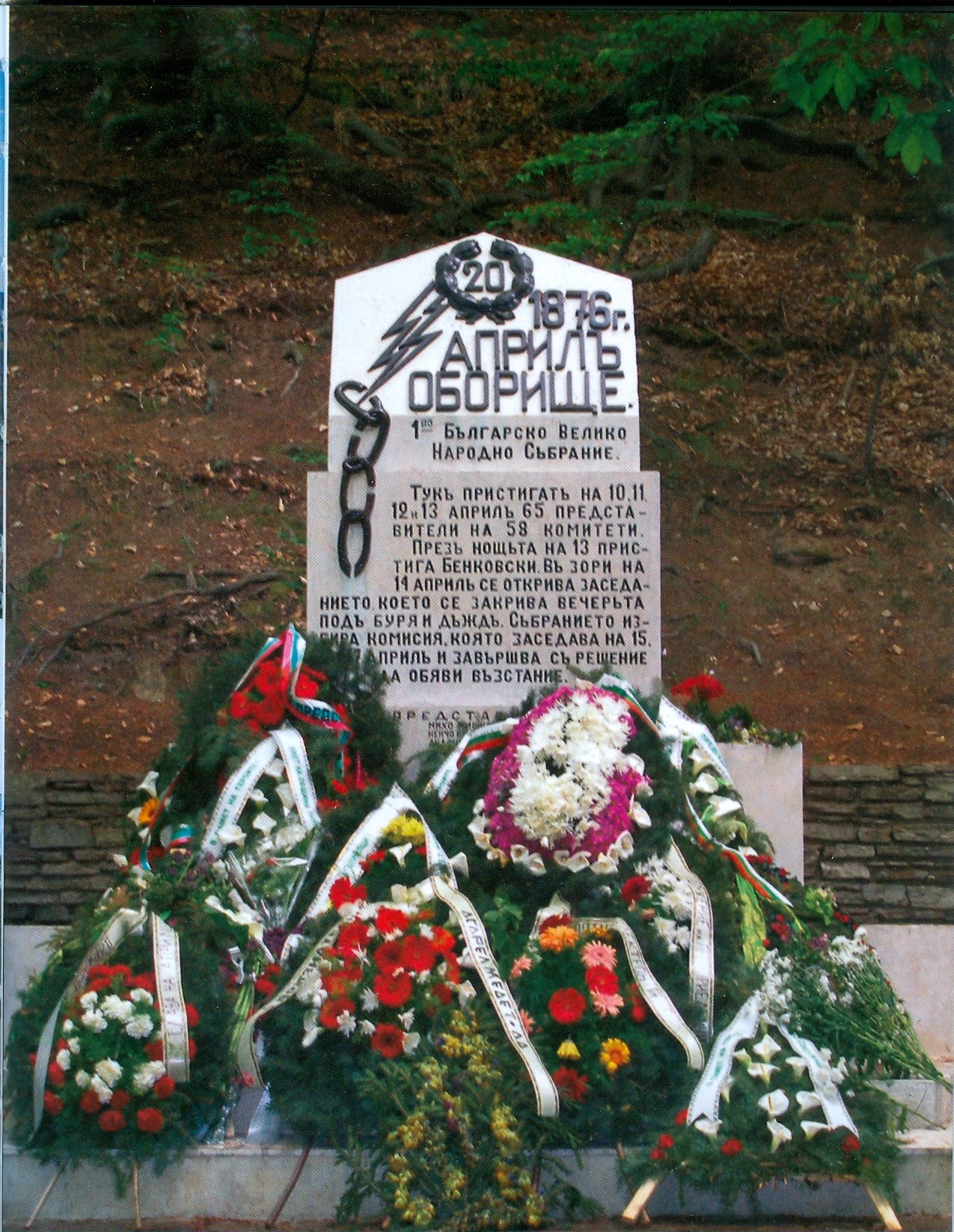
The Monument at Oborishte locality

In the course of the preparation of the April Uprising against the Ottoman Empire the representatives of the Fourth Revolutionary District assembled in the forests around the district's headquarters Panagyurishte. The assembly was held between 14 and 16 April (O.S.) 1876. The number of the deputies is unknown, varying according to different sources and studies from 49 to more than 350, from around 50 towns and villages. Headed by Georgi Benkovski the deputies took decision for the Uprising.

Deputies according to different sources:

Source	Number of deputies	Number of settlements
"Notes on the Bulgarian Uprisings" (1884)	56	50
"History of the April Uprising" (1907)	65	58
"Principality of Bulgaria"	55	49
"Oborishte"	68	52
"Oborishtentsi" (1972)	64	54
"Short History of the Sredna Gora Uprising" (1901)	80	
"The First Gun"	108	

== Honour ==
Oborishte Ridge on Greenwich Island in the South Shetland Islands, Antarctica is named after the historical site of Oborishte.

== Sources ==
- Chisholm, Hugh, ed. (1911). "Bulgaria/History" . Encyclopædia Britannica. Vol. 04 (11th ed.). Cambridge University Press. pp. 779–784.
- Harris, David (1939). Britain and the Bulgarian horrors of 1876. Chicago: University of Chicago Press. pp. 15–16. hdl:2027/uc1.b3945523.
- "Оборищенци" (Сборник от исторически очерци за народните представители на Оборище през 1876 година), редакция и съставителство Христо М. Йонков, ДВИ, С., 1972.
