= Avramovo Saddle =

Mountain pass in Bulgaria

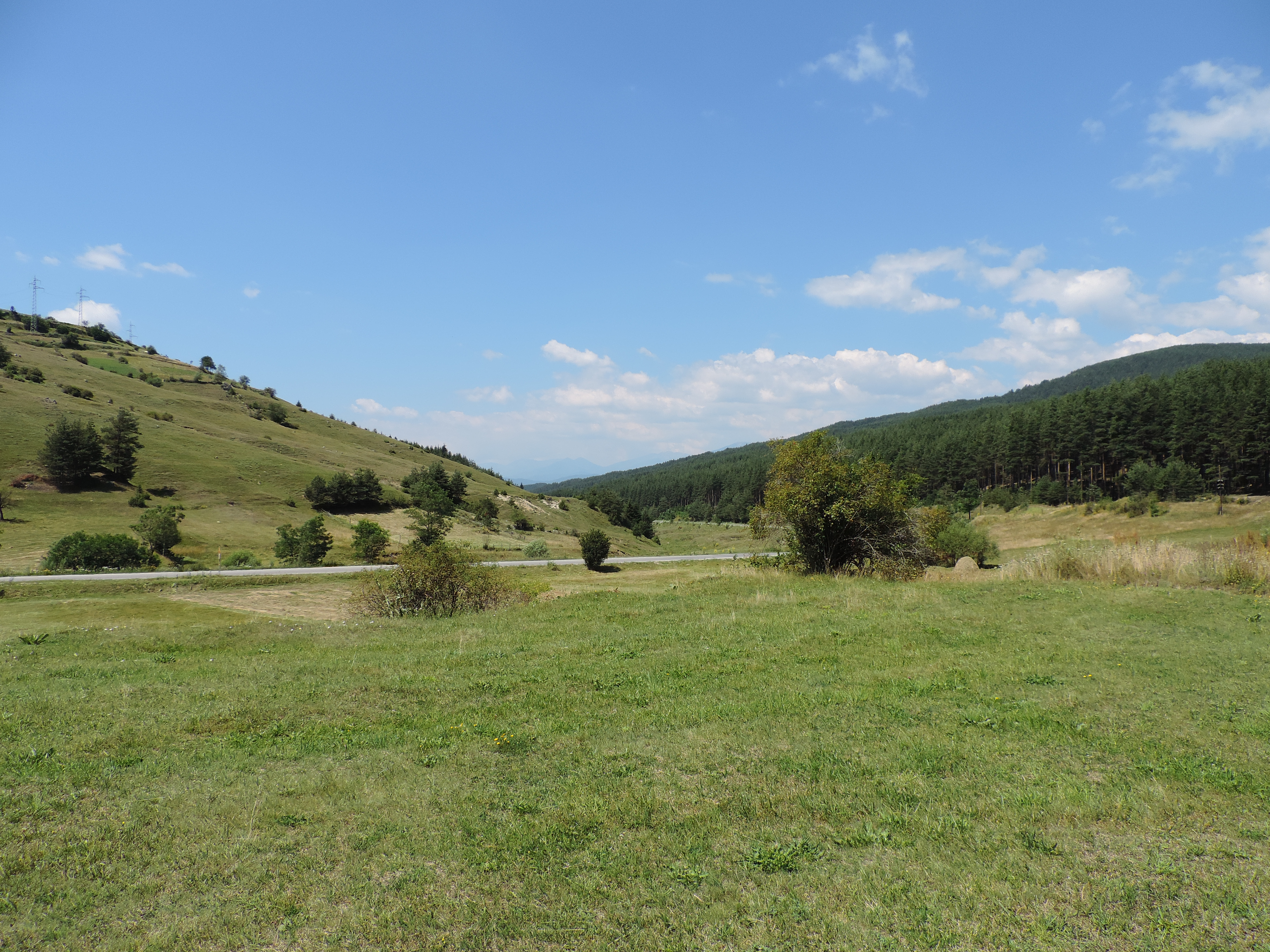

- Location within Bulgaria
- Elevation: 1,295 metres (4,249 ft)

Third Approach
- Location: Bulgaria
- Range: Rila and Rhodope Mountains
- Coordinates: 42°02′21″N 23°49′55″E

Avramovo Saddle (Bulgarian: Аврамова седловина) is a mountain saddle (pass) in western Bulgaria forming the orographic boundary between the mountain ranges of Rila to the north and Rhodope to the south. It is situated on the territory of the Yakoruda Municipality in Blagoevgrad Province and Velingrad Municipality in Pazardzhik Province.

The pass is situated east of the Dreshtenets, a left tributary of the Cherna Mesta, a left constituent river of the Mesta. Its altitude is 1,295 m. The climate is transitional continental, with Mediterranean climate influence coming through the Razlog Valley to the west. The pass is covered with extensive meadows and coniferous forests of Scots pine (Pinus sylvestris) and Norway spruce (Picea abies).

Avramovo Saddle has important economic significance. It is traversed by a section of the II-84 road Zvanichevo–Velingrad–Razlog, as well as the Septemvri–Dobrinishte narrow-gauge line, connecting the Upper Thracian Plain and the Razlog Valley. At an altitude of 1,267 m, the Avramovo train station serving the nearby village of homonymous village is the highest train station in the Balkans.
