= Konarsko =

- Village
- Location within Bulgaria
- Coordinates: 42°00′N 23°43′E
- Country: Bulgaria
- Province: Blagoevgrad Province
- Municipality: Yakoruda Municipality

Area
  - Total: 19 km^{2} (7.3 sq mi)
- Elevation: 1,329 m (4,360 ft)

Population (31.12.2016)
  - Total: ▼898
- Time zone: UTC+2 (EET)
  - Summer (DST): UTC+3 (EEST)

Konarsko is a village in Yakoruda Municipality, in Blagoevgrad Province, in southwestern Bulgaria. It is a mainly Pomak village.
