= Bel Kamen =

- Village
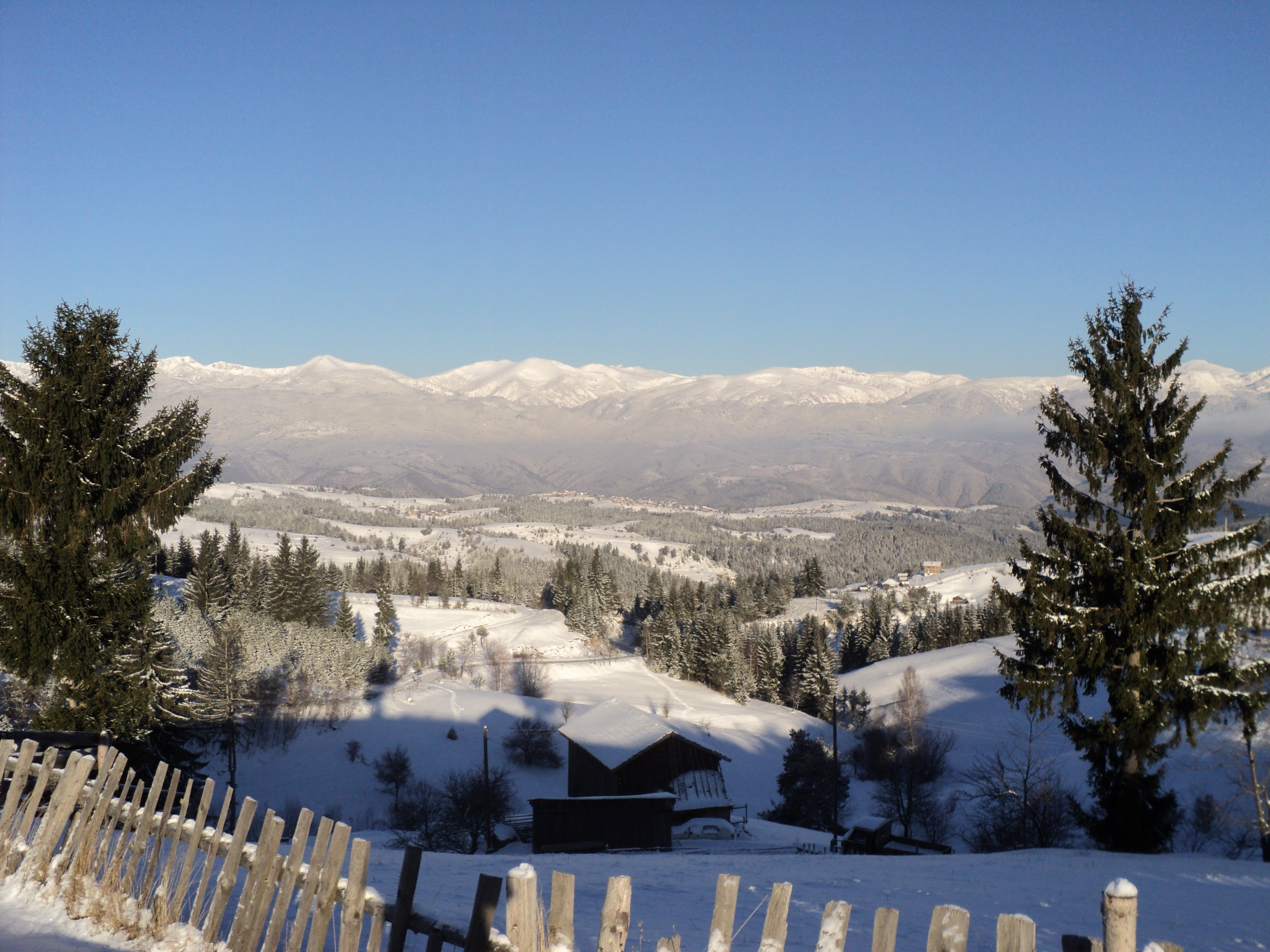

- Location within Bulgaria
- Coordinates: 41°39′N 23°44′E
- Country: Bulgaria
- Province: Blagoevgrad Province
- Municipality: Yakoruda Municipality
- Time zone: UTC+2 (EET)
  - Summer (DST): UTC+3 (EEST)

Bel Kamen (Bulgarian: Бел камен) is a village in Yakoruda Municipality, in Blagoevgrad Province, in southwestern Bulgaria.

== Geography ==
Bel Kamen is located in Southwestern Bulgaria, Blagoevgrad Region, 18 kilometers southeast of the municipal city - Yakoruda. It occupies the north-western parts of the Veliysko-Videnishki division of the Western Rhodopes. To the southwest of the village rises the highest peak in this part of the Rhodopes - Veliitsa, which is 1712 meters high. The geological structure in the area of the village is made of granite. The climate is transitional-continental with a significant mountain influence. Average annual rainfall is about 800 mm. The height of the snow cover is significant due to the nature of the relief. The river network in the area of the village is part of the catchment basin of the Dreshtenets River, a tributary of the Mesta River. Brown forest soils, secondary grasses and coniferous forests of Scots pine and Norway spruce predominate. In the land of the village there are several centuries-old trees, which are protected by order RD-82 of January 30, 2004.
