= II-84 road (Bulgaria) =

Road in Bulgaria

Republic Road I-84
- Републикански път I-84

Route information
- Length: 104.8 km (65.1 mi)

Major junctions
- From: Km 184.4 of I-8 near Zvanichevo
- To: Km 36.6 of II-19 near Razlog

Location
- Country: Bulgaria
- Towns: Velingrad, Yakoruda

Highway system
- Highways in Bulgaria

Republican Road II-84 (Bulgarian: Републикански път II-84) is a 2nd class road in Bulgaria, running in direction northeast–southwest through the territory of Blagoevgrad and Pazardzhik Provinces. Its length is 104.8 km.

== Route description ==
The road starts at Km 184.4 of the first class I-8 road at the village of Zvanichevo in Pazardzhik Province and proceeds southwest through the Upper Thracian Plain, passing through the villages of Bratanitsa and Vetren Dol. It then crosses the river Chepinska reka and in the eastern part of the village of Varvara it enters the river's deep gorge in the Rhodope Mountains, where it runs parallel to the Septemvri–Dobrinishte narrow-gauge line. At Tsepina railway station it leaves the gorge and ascends through the valley of a right tributary of the Chepinska reka. At the railway station of Kostandovo the road turns west and enters the Chepino Valley, where it passes through the town of Velingrad, the largest settlement along the route. After the town the road leaves the valley and ascends westwards to the village of Yundola, where it enters the Avramovo Saddle (1,295 m) between the Rhodope Mountains and Rila.

Close to the saddle's highest point, it enters Blagoevgrad Province and descends to the Avramovo train station, the highest in the Balkans, and follows the valley of the Dreshtenets, a left tributary of the Cherna Mesta, the left constituent river of the Mesta. The road then successively follows the valleys of the Cherna Mesta and the Mesta itself, passing through the town of Yakoruda and the villages of Yurukovo, Dagonovo and Kraishte. At General Kovachev railway station it leaves the Mesta valley and heads west through the valley of its right tributary the Iztok. After 4 km it enters the Razlog Valley north of the village of Banya and traverses the valley in western direction, before reaching its terminus at the junction with the second class II-19 road at Km 36.6 of the latter, about one kilometer south of the town of Razlog.

== Gallery ==
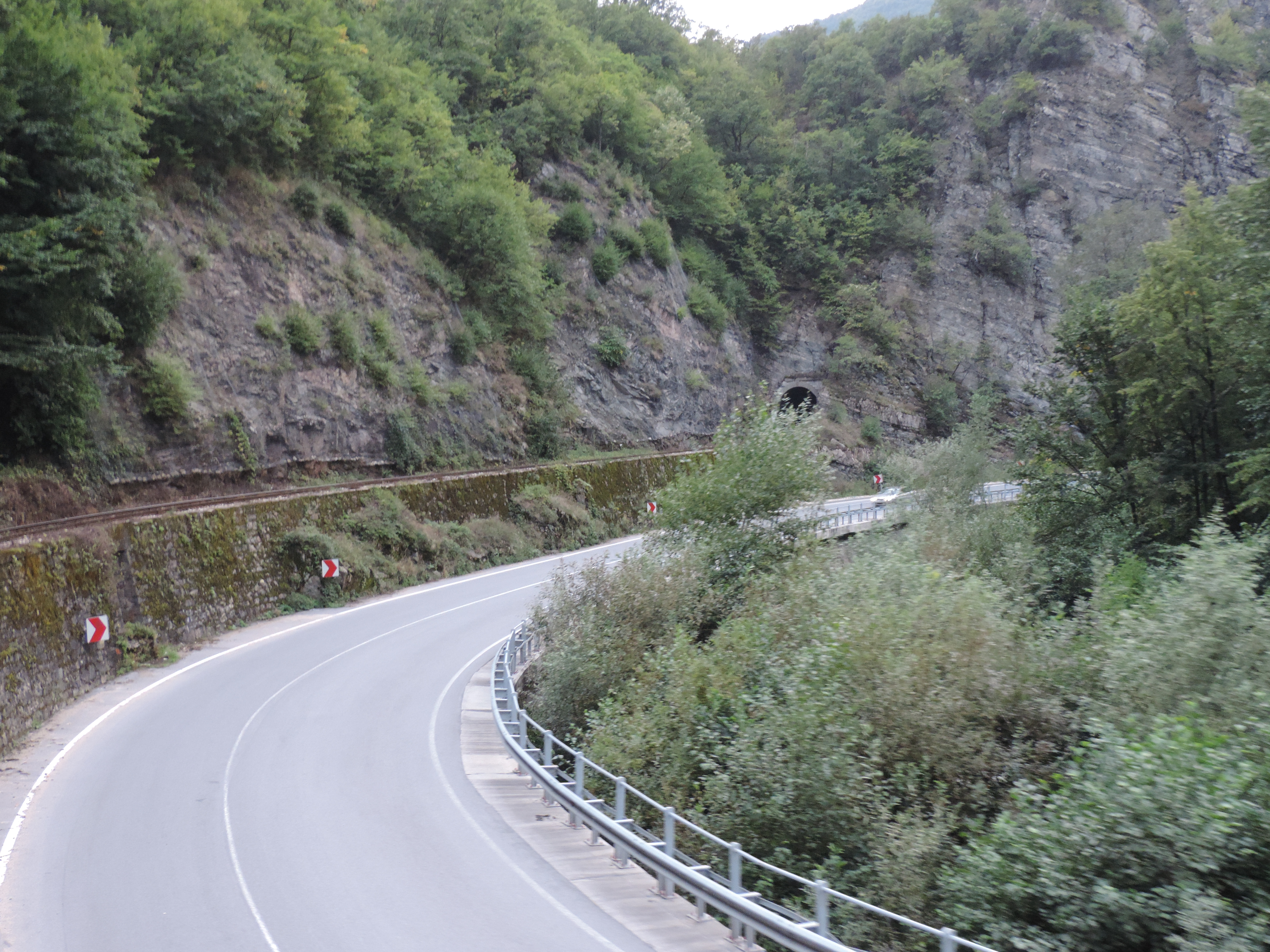
II-84 at Chepino Gorge

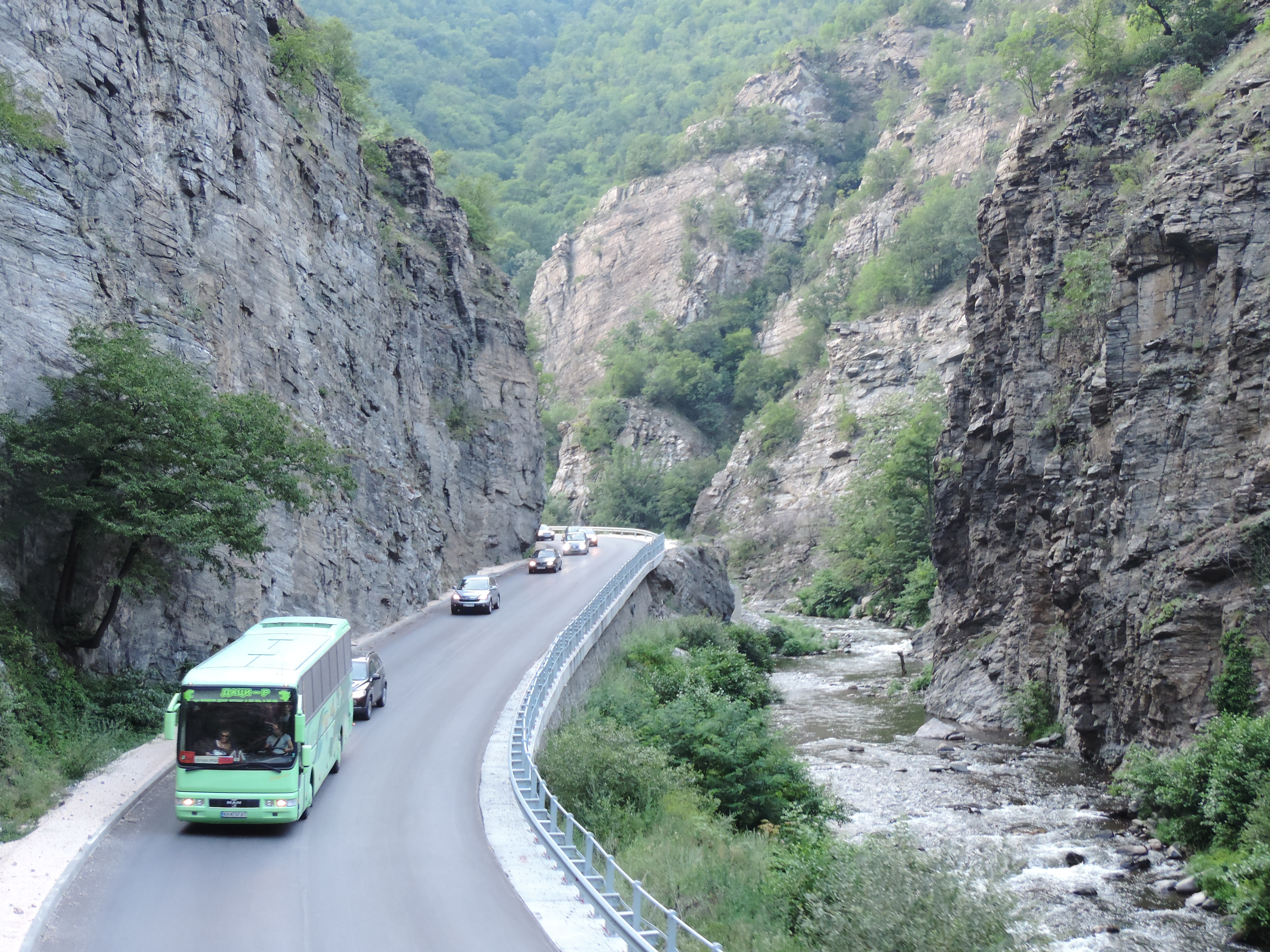
II-84 at Chepino Gorge

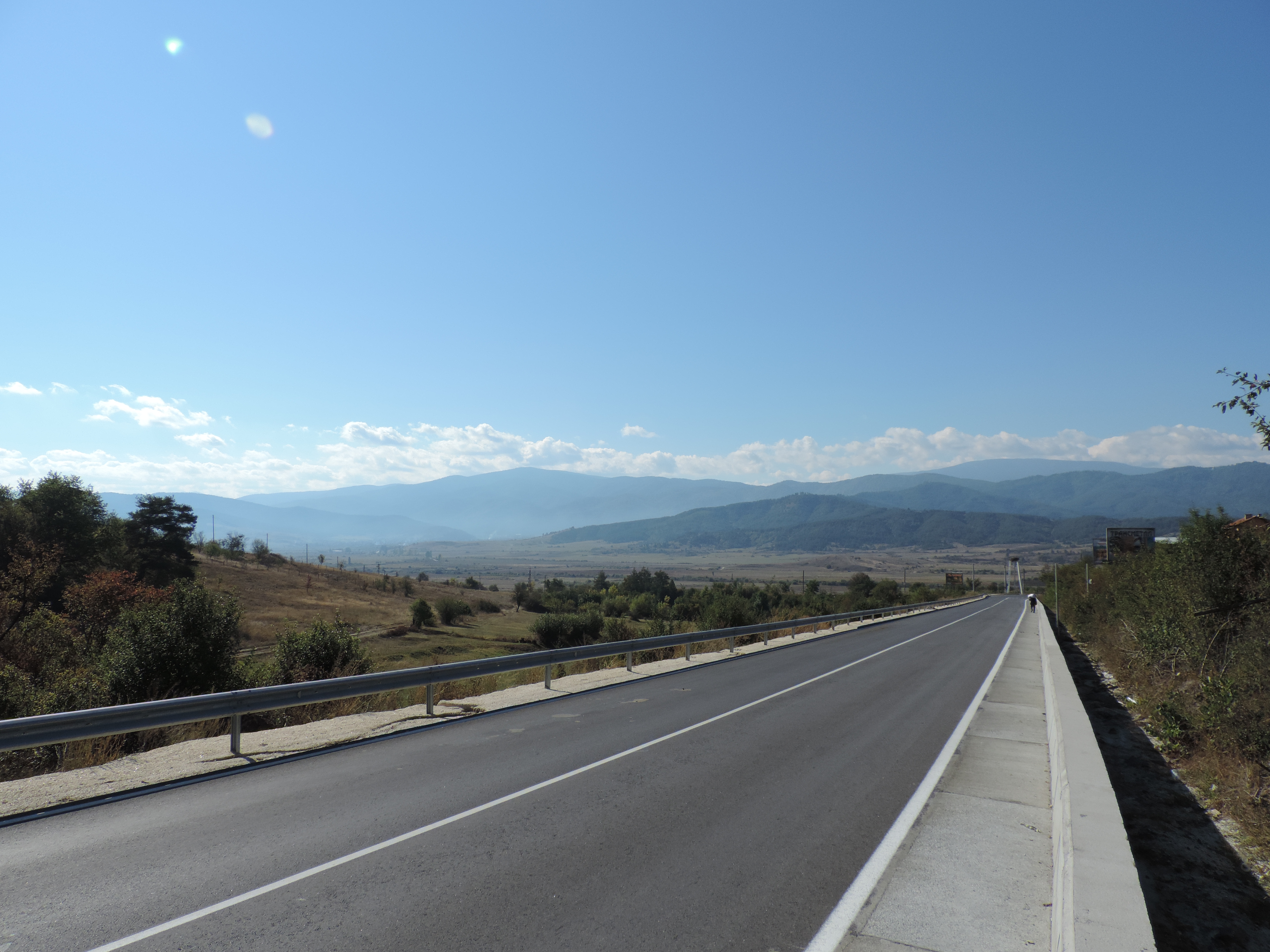
II-84 at Chepino Valley

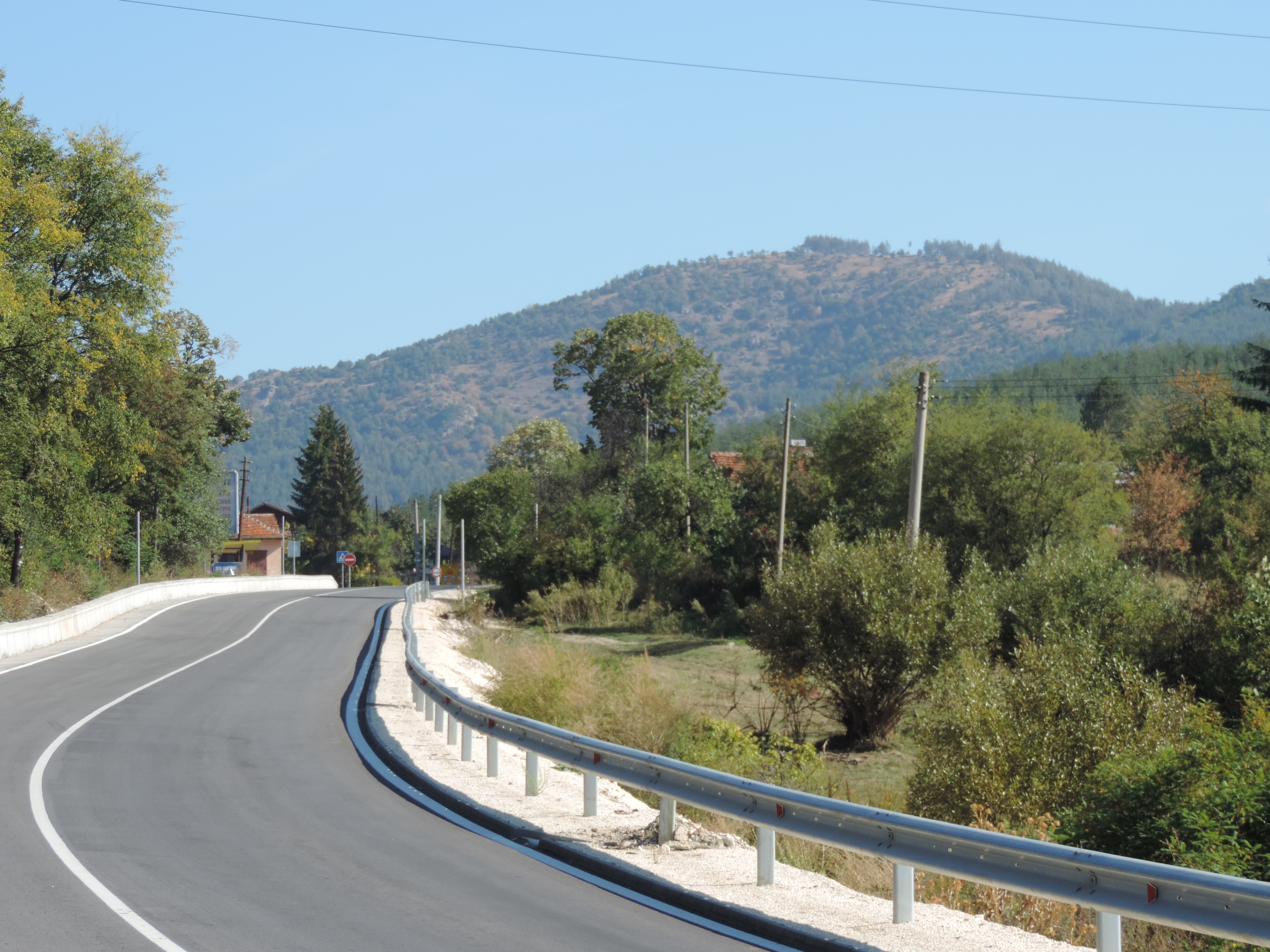
II-84 at Kostandovo
