= Zvanichevo =

Zvanichevo Звъничево
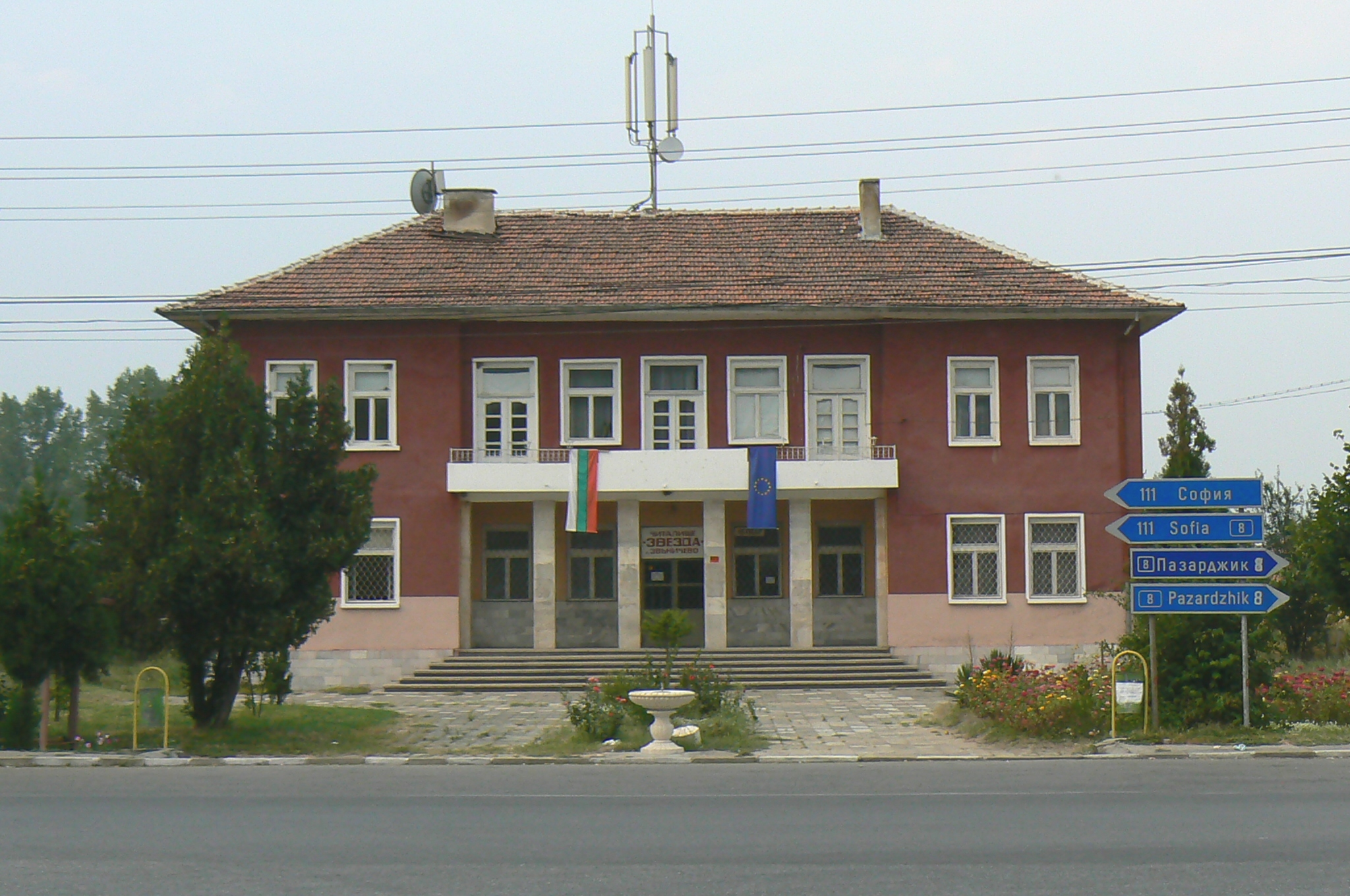
- Chitalishte "Zvezda"

- Location of Zvanichevo, Bulgaria
- Coordinates: 42°11′25.48″N 24°15′2.64″E
- Country: Bulgaria
- Provinces (Oblast): Pazardzhik Province

Government
  - Mayor: Ivan Yankulov
- Elevation: 220 m (720 ft)

Population (15.03.2024)
  - Total: 1,716
- Time zone: UTC+2 (EET)
  - Summer (DST): UTC+3 (EEST)
- Postal Code: 4415
- Area codes: 03521 from Bulgaria, 003593521 from outside

Zvanichevo (Bulgarian: Звъничево) is a village in southern Bulgaria. It has a population of 1,716 as of 2024.

== Geography ==
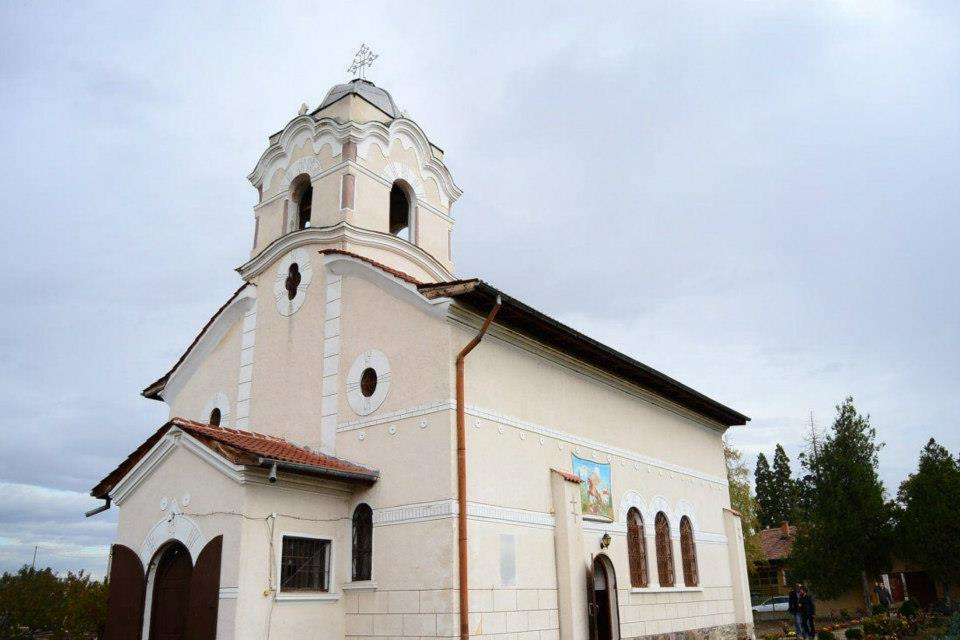
The Church of St Demetrius

Zvanichevo is located in central Pazardzhik Province and has a territory of 12.319 km^{2}. It is part of Pazardzhik Municipality and lies 8 km east of the municipal center Pazardzhik. The village is served by the first class I-8 road which is part of the European route E80, and is the starting point of the second class II-84 road that leads to the Razlog Valley in southwestern Bulgaria. Zvanichevo is on the important railway line No. 1 Kalotina–Sofia–Plovdiv–Svilengrad served by the Bulgarian State Railways. The closest villages are Lozen and Kovachevo to the west, Bratanitsa to the southwest and Mokrishte to the east.

Zvanichevo is situated in the western part of the Upper Thracian Plain, about 1.5 m south of the river Maritsa.

== Culture ==
The Church of St Demetrius is situated in the center of the village. The chitalishte "Zvezda" was established in 1927. There are a school, a kindergarten and a medical center.

== Economy ==
The village lies in a fertile agricultural area. Crops include grain, fruits and vegetables. Livestock breeding is also developed.
