= Avramovo, Blagoevgrad Province =

Avramovo
- Village
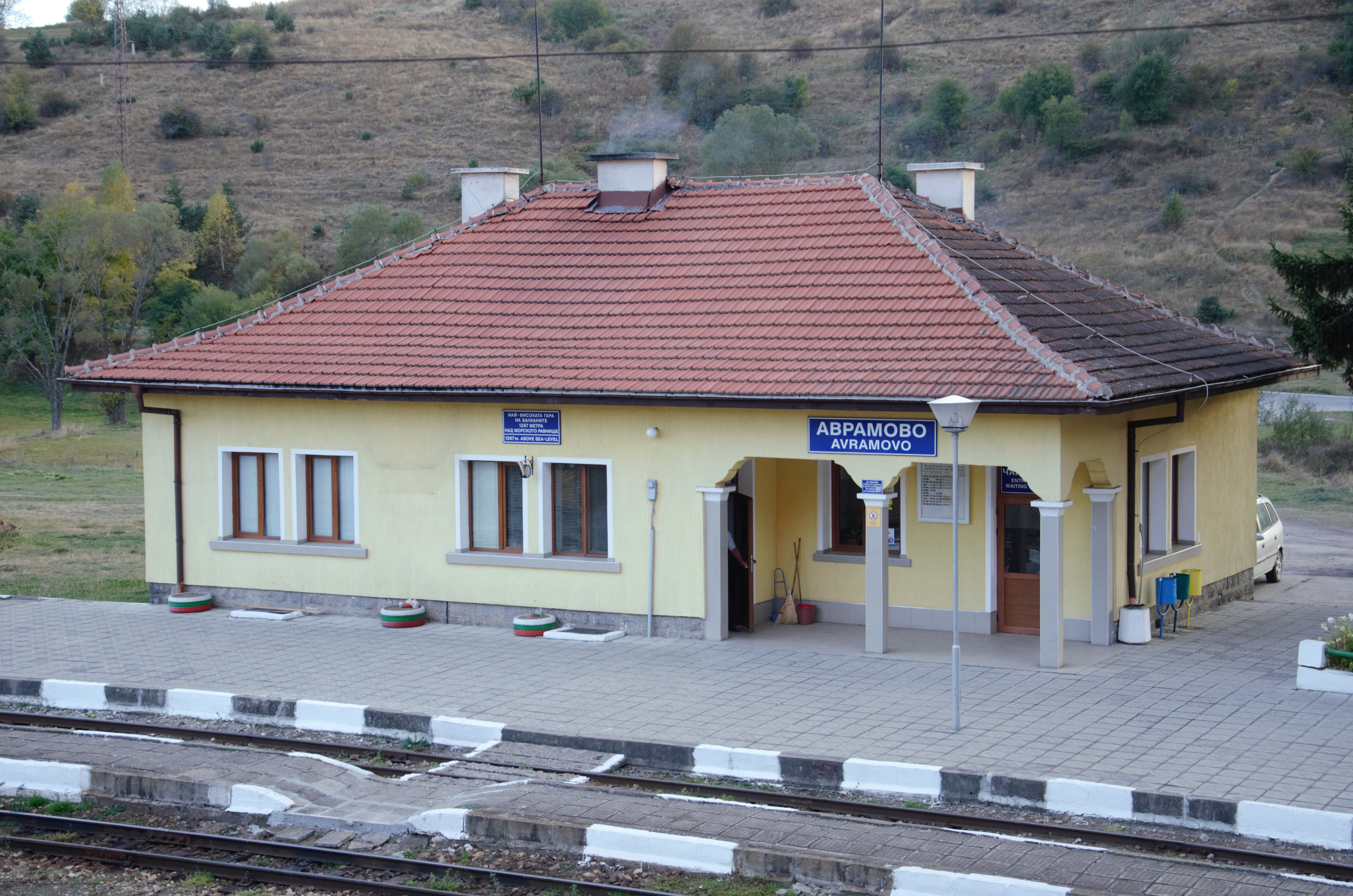

- Location within Bulgaria
- Coordinates: 42.0303537°N 23.8109186°E
- Country: Bulgaria
- Province: Blagoevgrad Province
- Municipality: Yakoruda Municipality
- Time zone: UTC+2 (EET)
  - Summer (DST): UTC+3 (EEST)

Avramovo (Bulgarian: Аврамово) is a village in Yakoruda Municipality, in Blagoevgrad Province, in southwestern Bulgaria. Its railway station is the highest point of the Septemvri–Dobrinishte narrow-gauge line, and in the Balkan Peninsula.

== Gallery ==
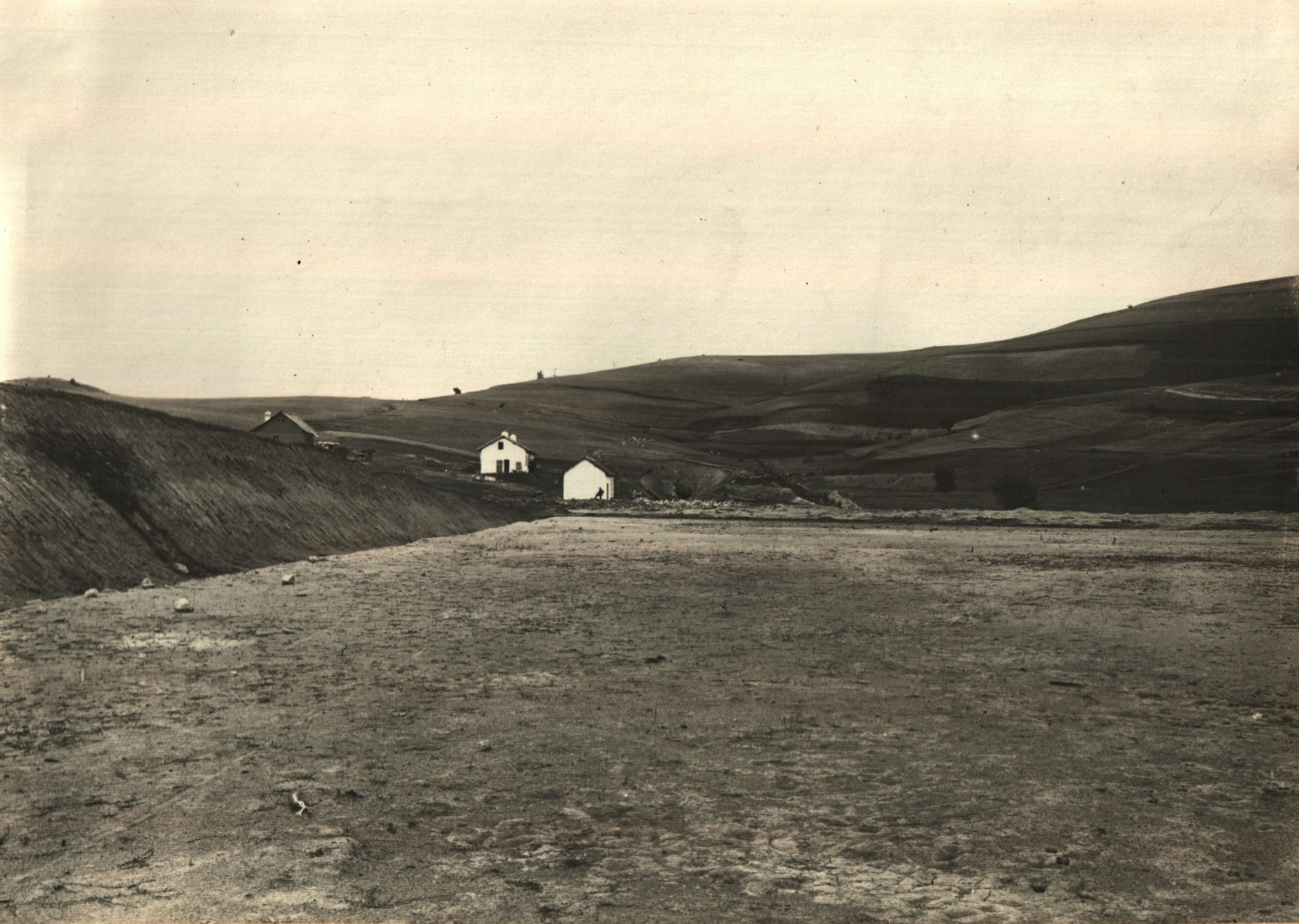

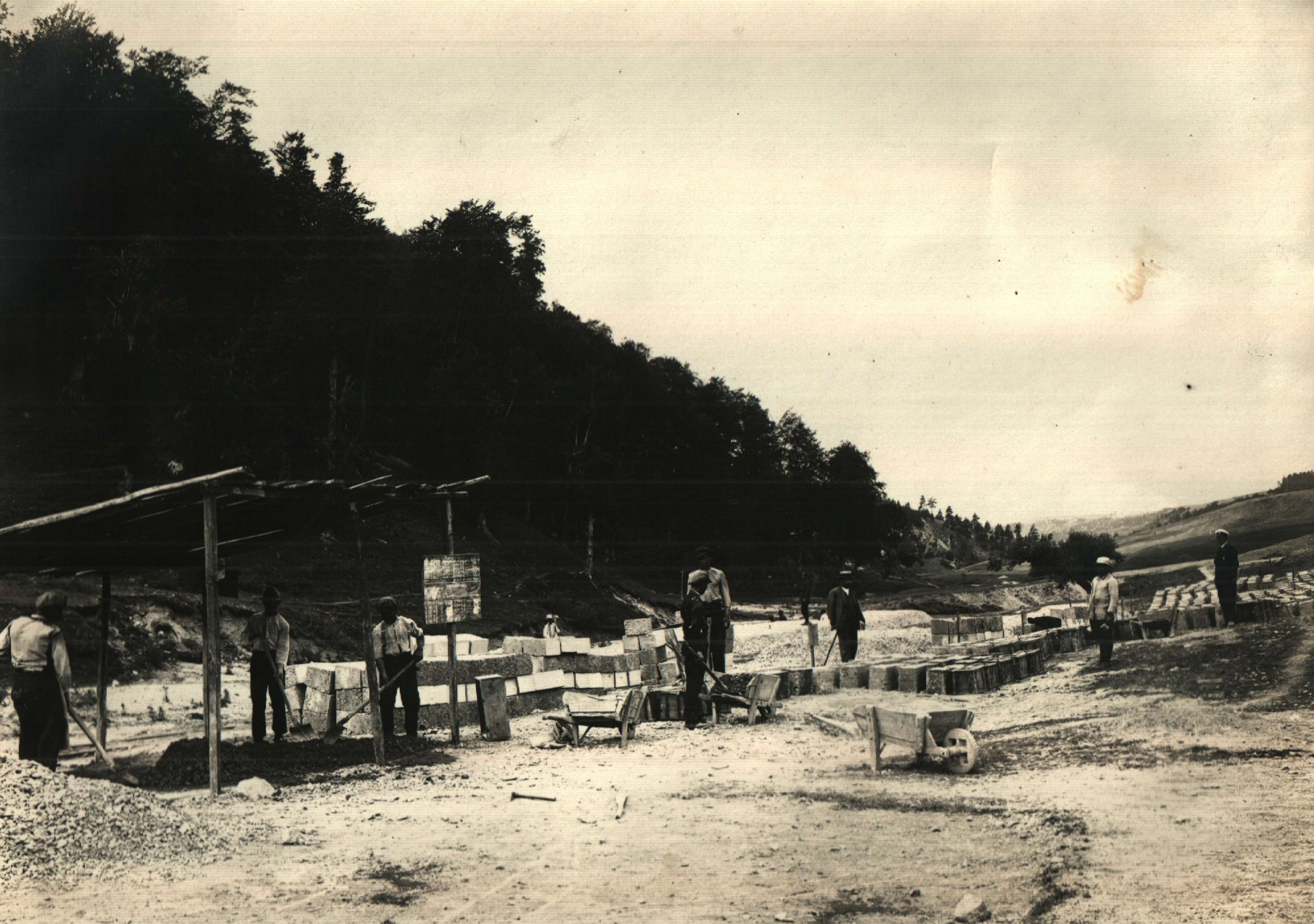

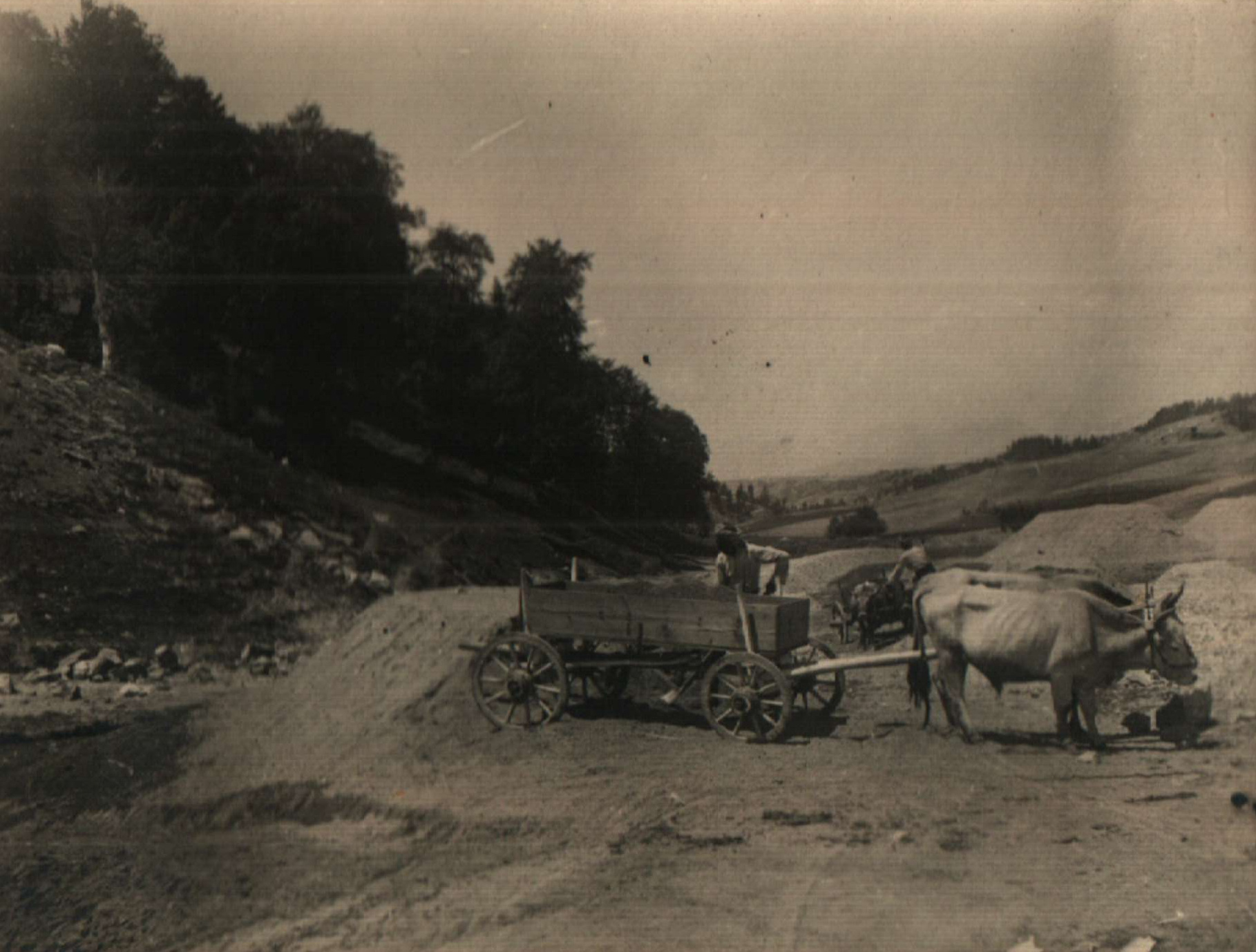

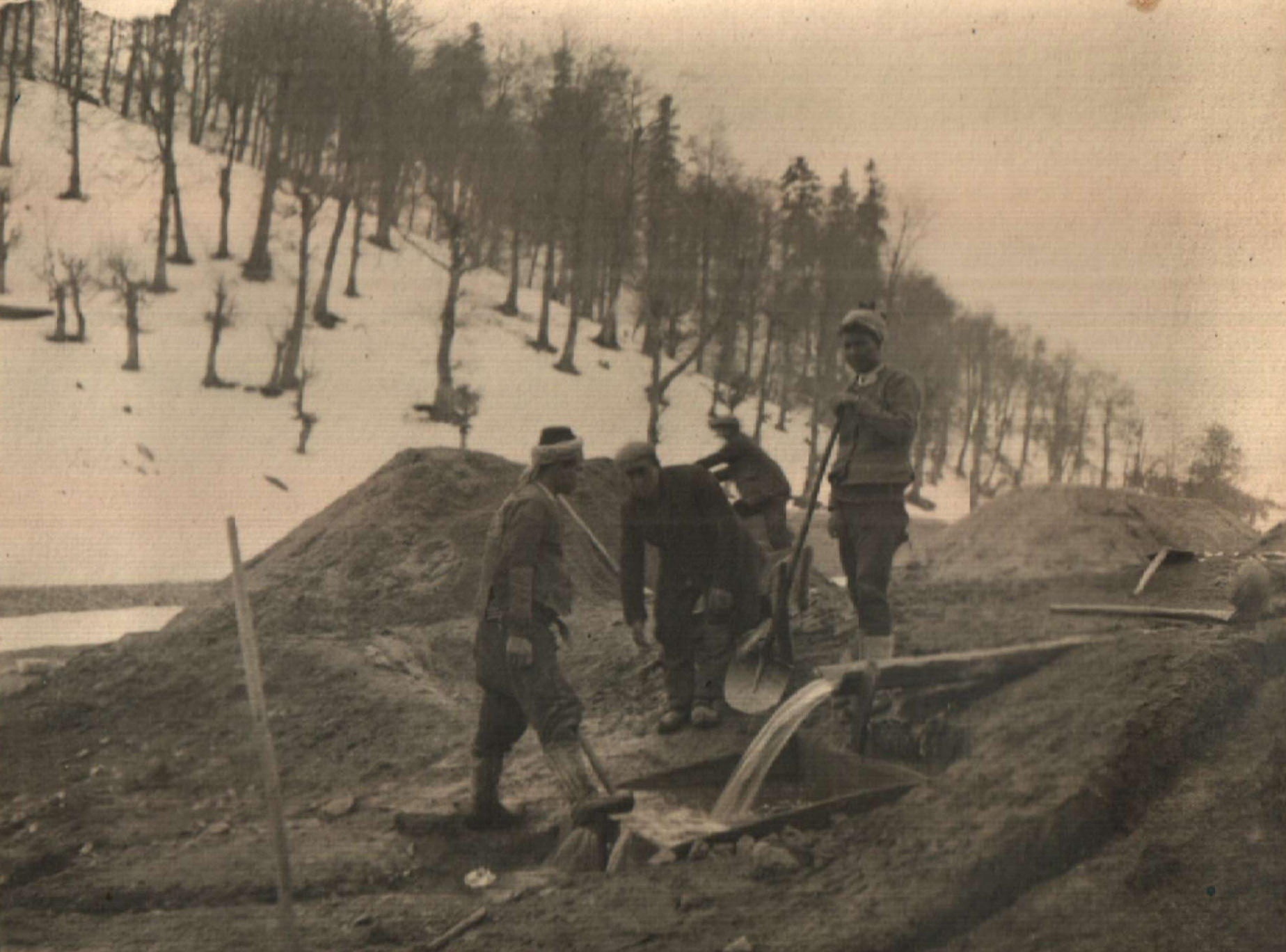

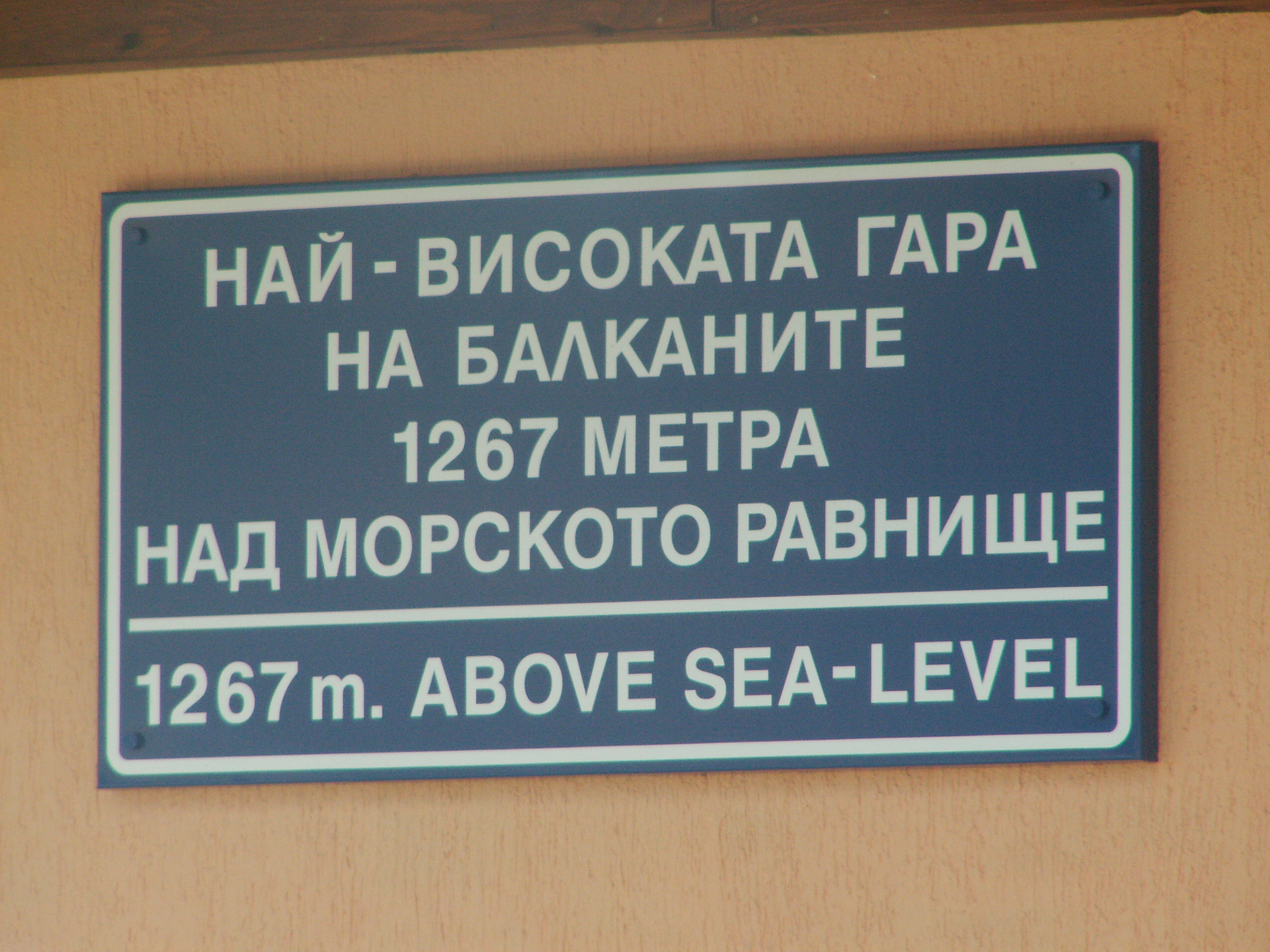

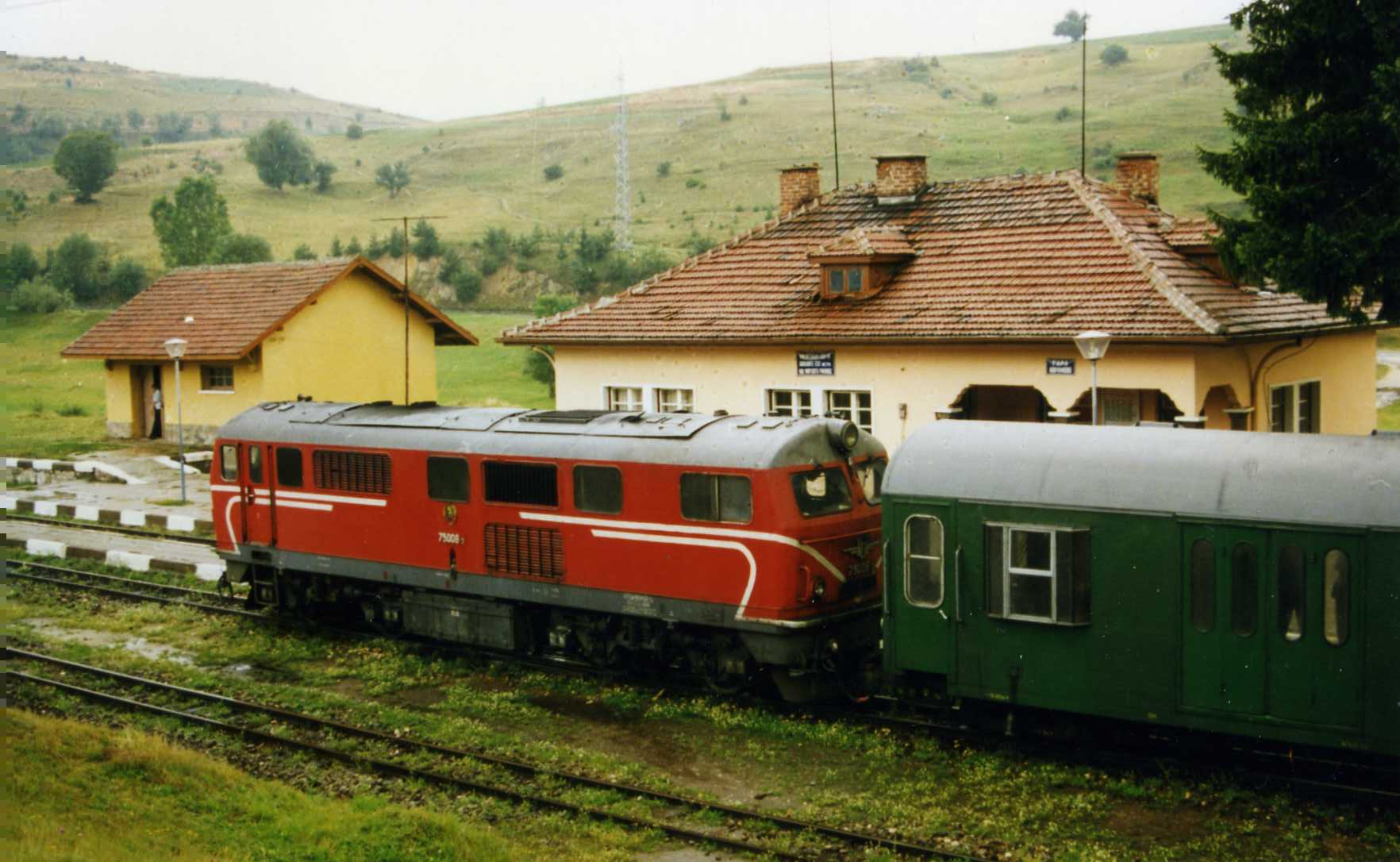

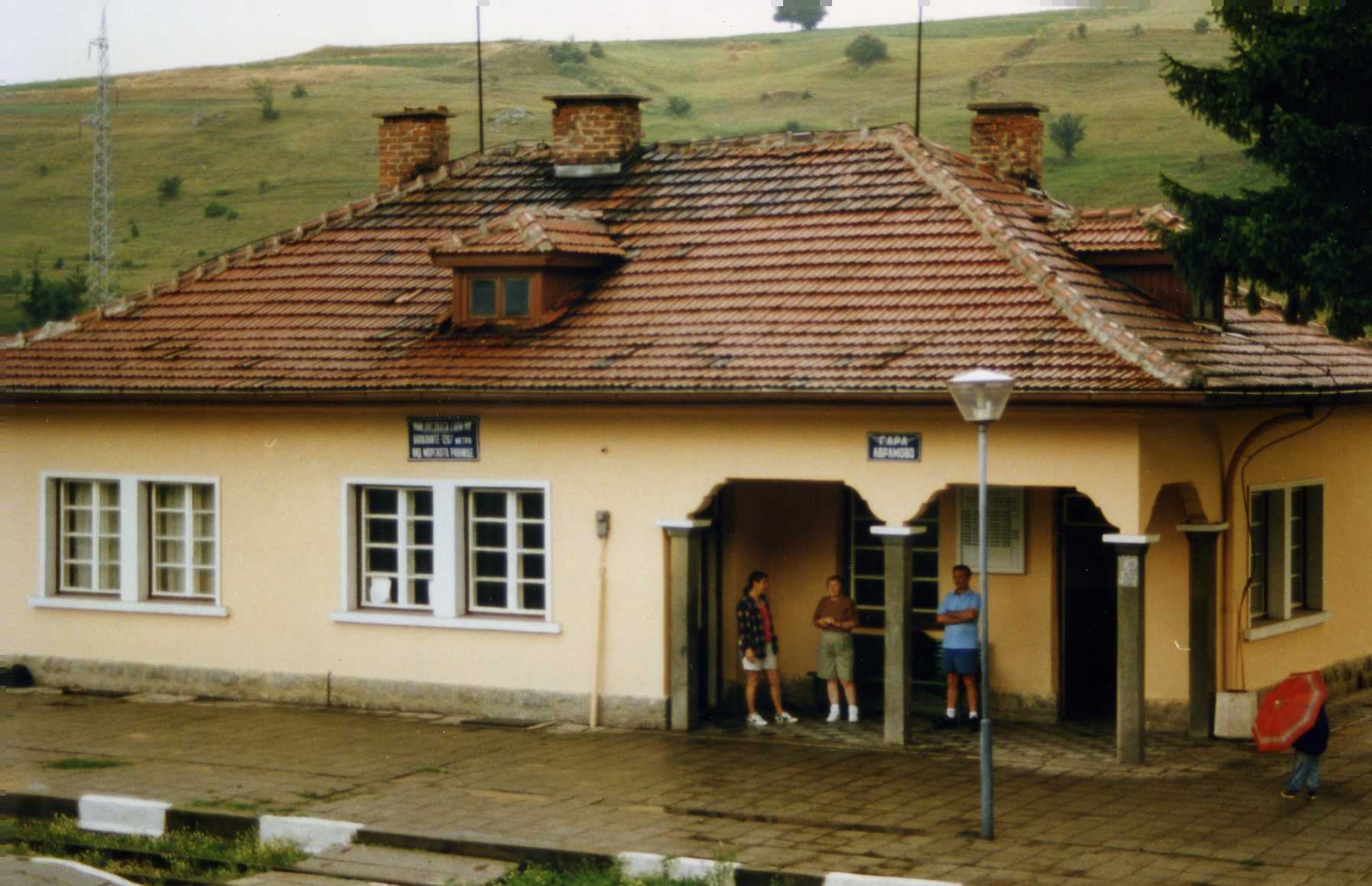

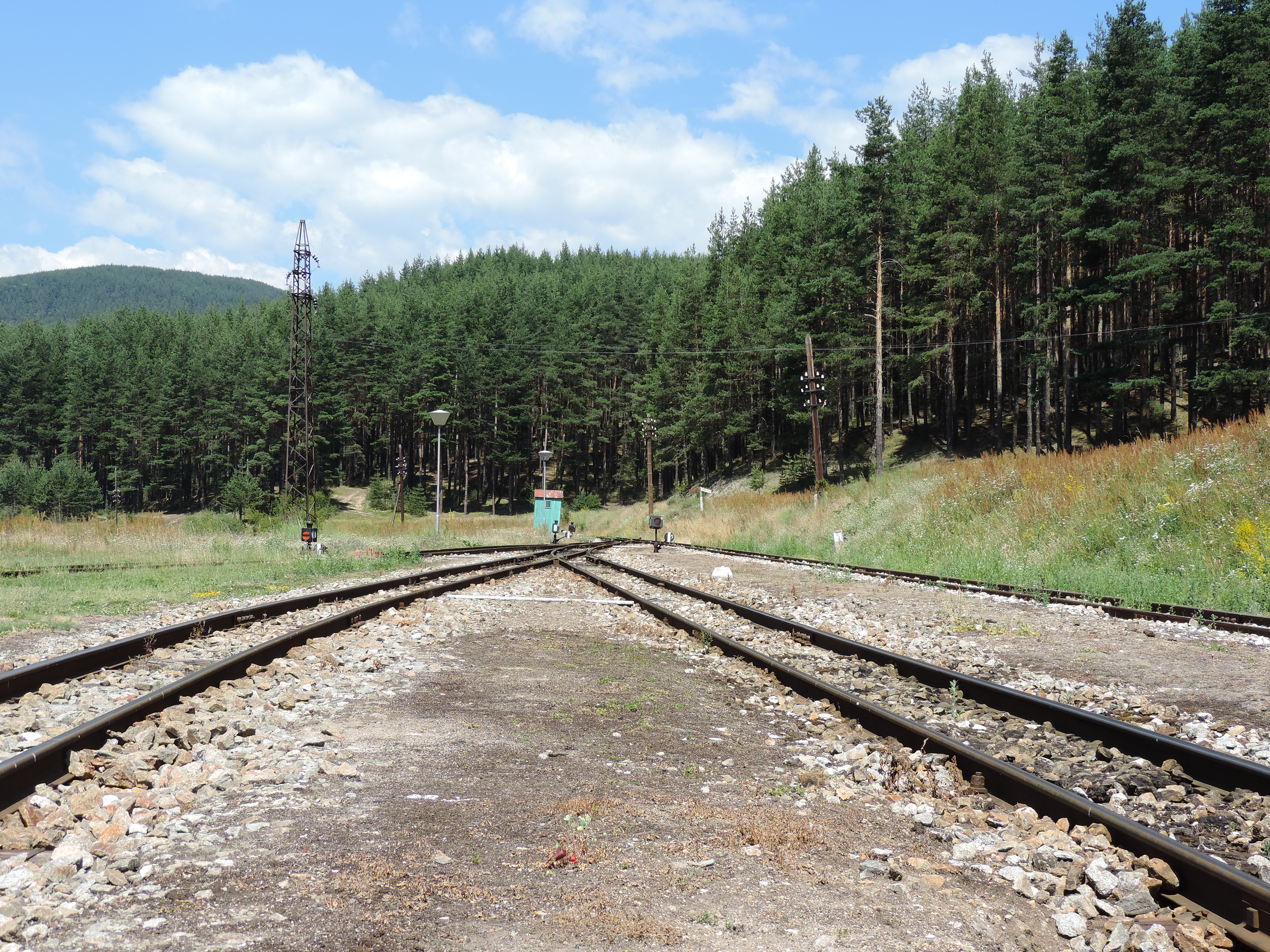

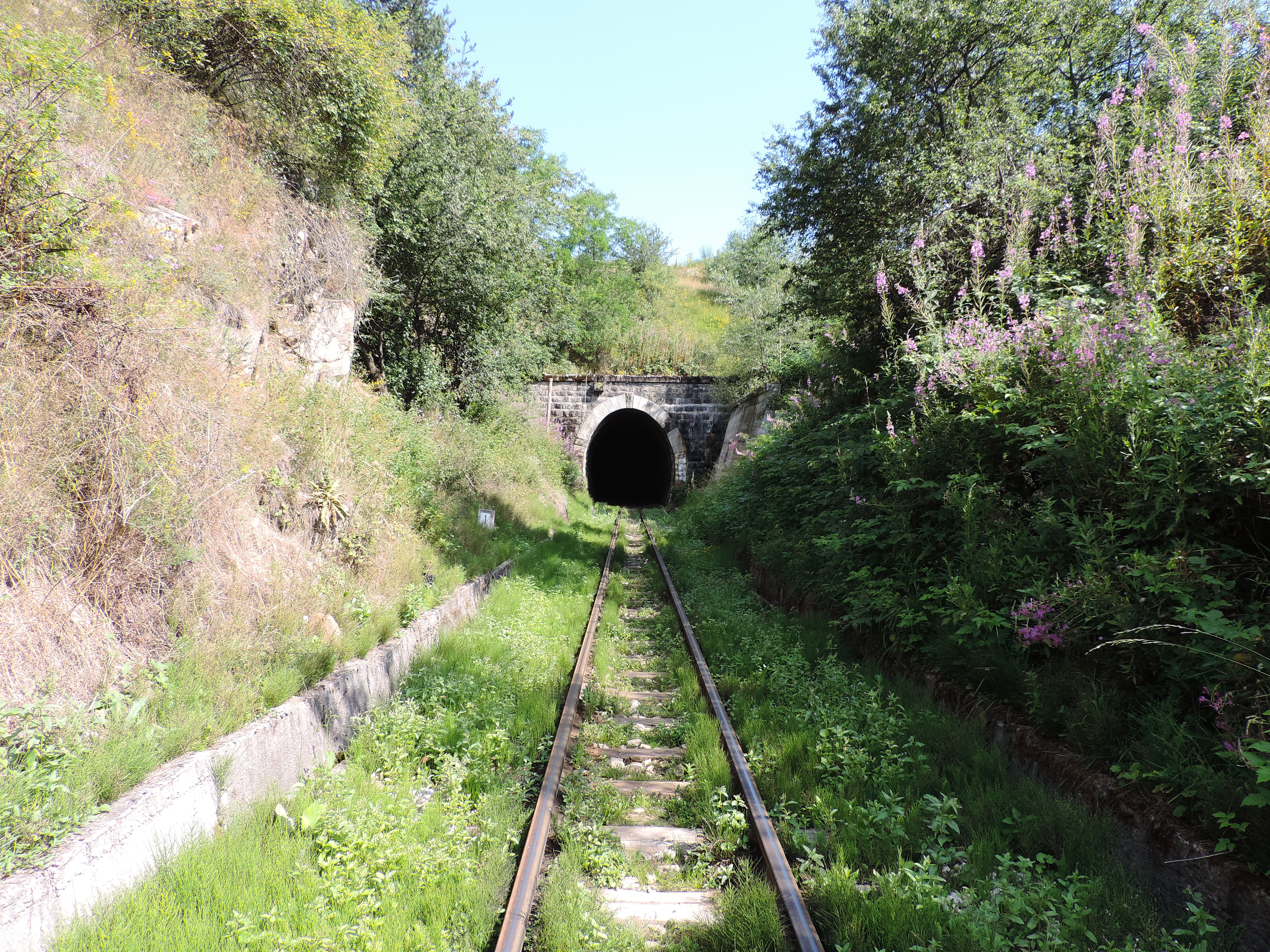

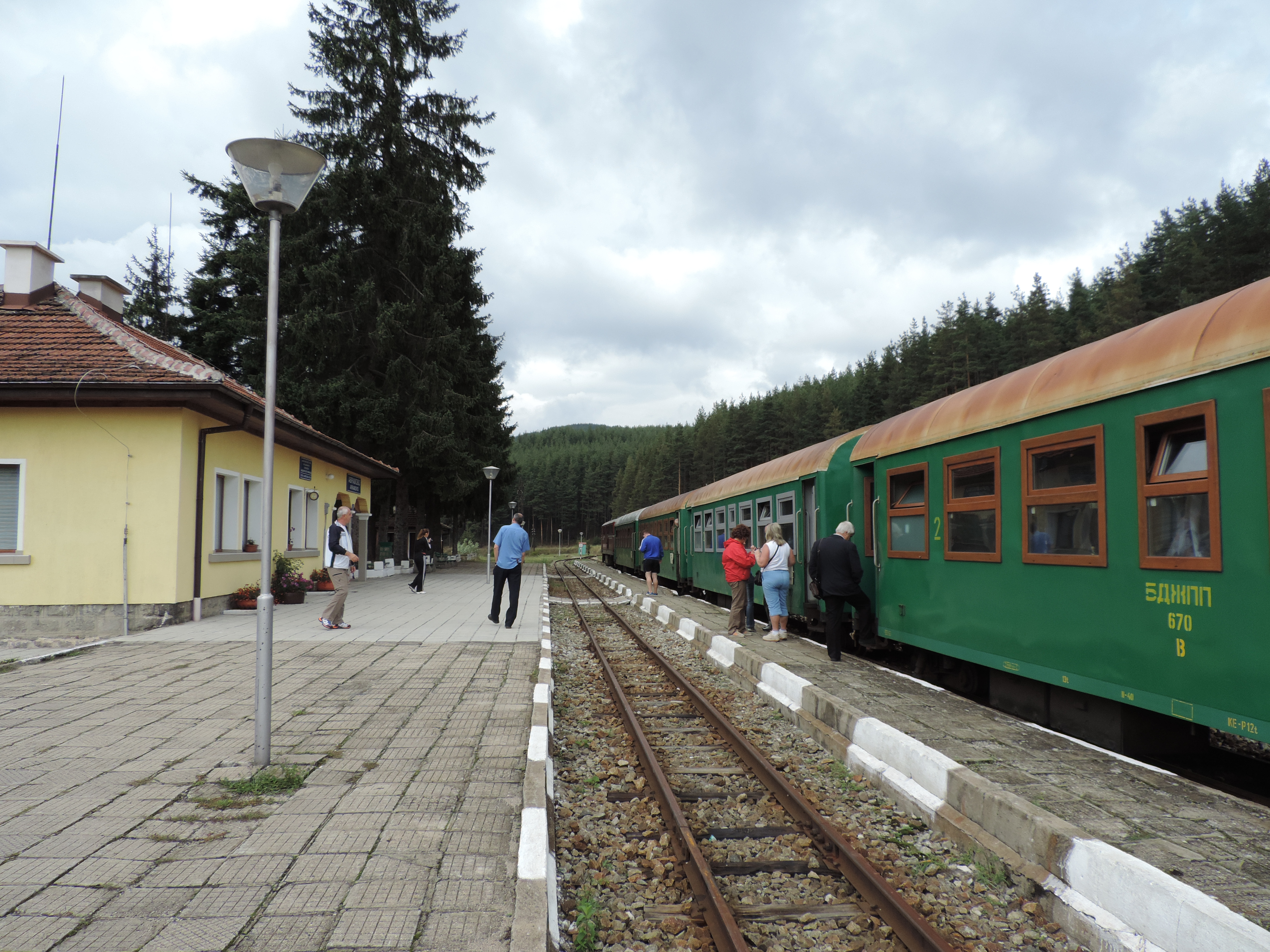

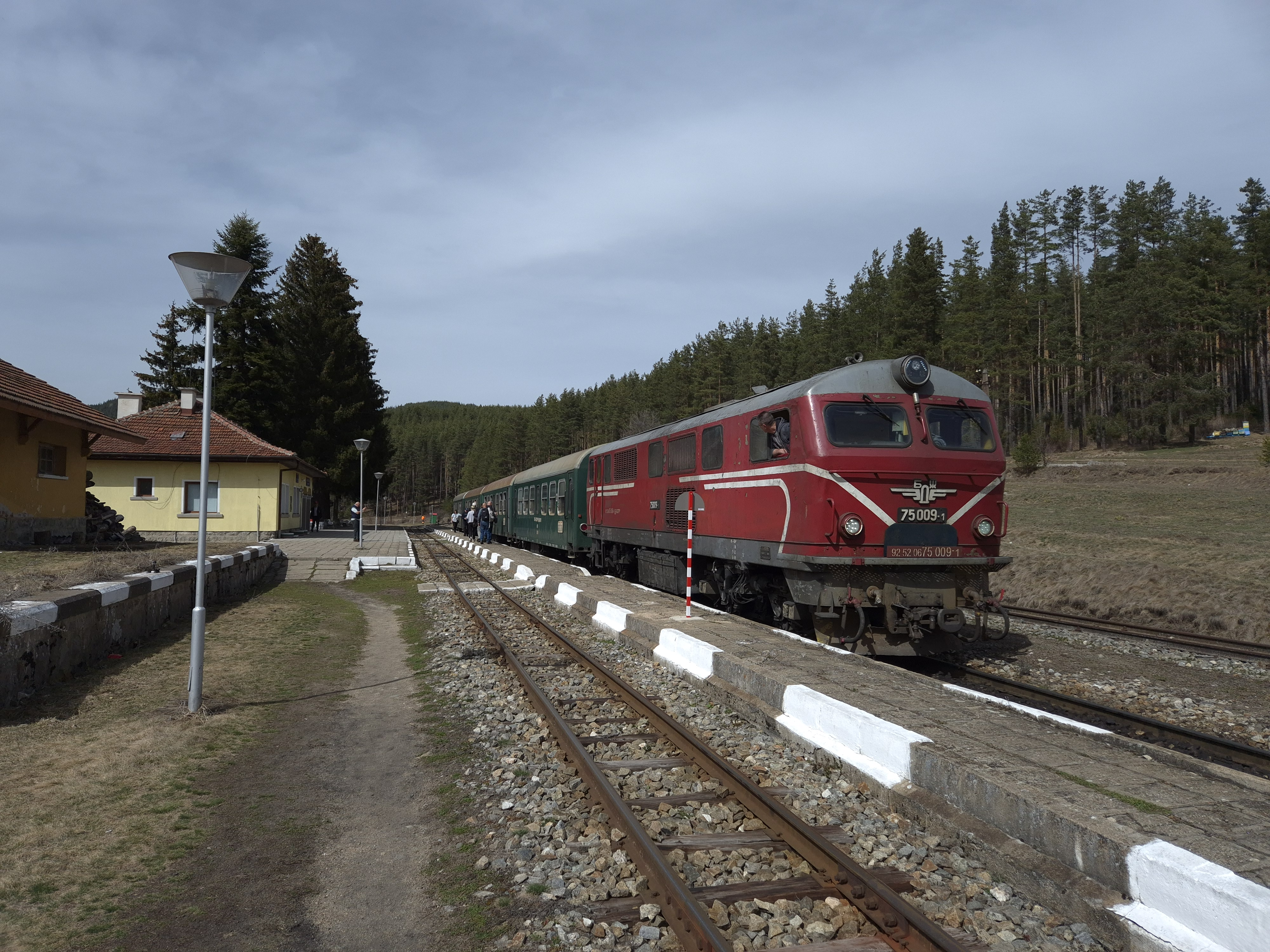
