= Yakoruda Municipality =

Coordinates: 42.0177°N 23.6688°E

Yakoruda Municipality Община Якоруда
- Municipality
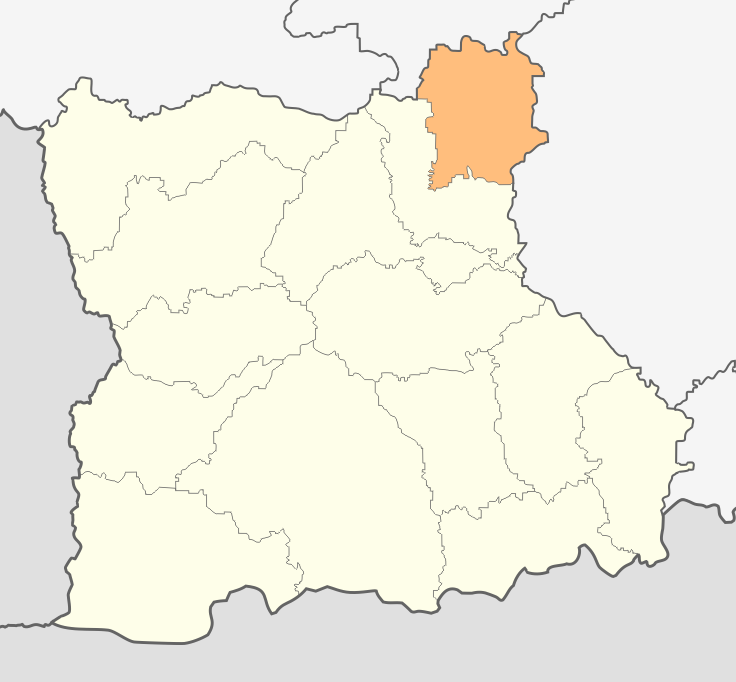
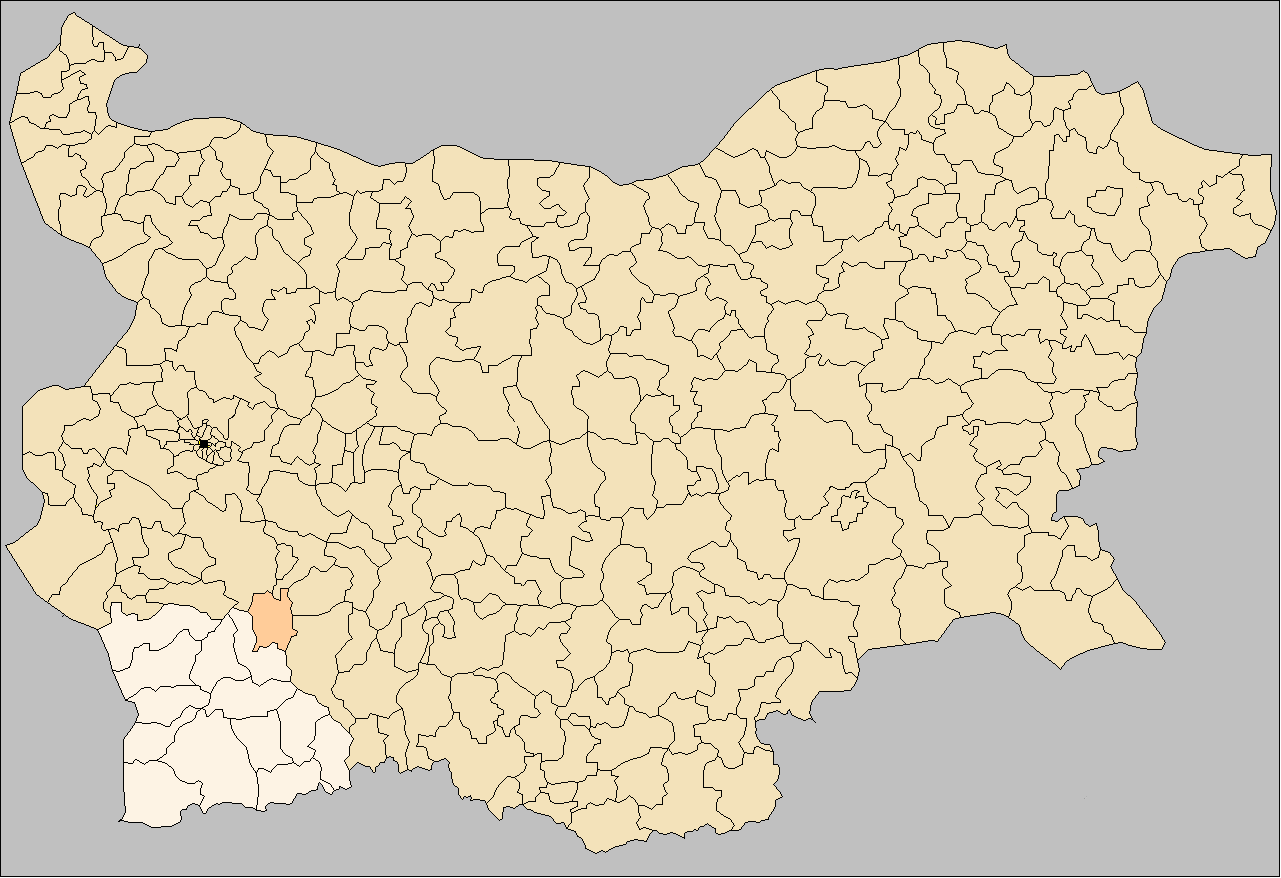
- Location in Blagoevgrad province Location on map of Bulgaria
- Country: Bulgaria
- Province (Oblast): Blagoevgrad

Area
  - Total: 339.28 km^{2} (131.00 sq mi)

Population
  - Total: 10,284
  - Density: 30.311/km^{2} (78.506/sq mi)

Yakoruda Municipality is a municipality in Blagoevgrad Province in southwestern Bulgaria.

== Demographics ==
Of all the people who answered the question on their religion, 77% declared Muslim. Most of those Muslims are the so-called Pomaks, or Bulgarian Muslims but they tend to declare themselves as Turkish people.

=== Religion ===
According to the latest Bulgarian census of 2011, the religious composition, among those who answered the optional question on religious identification, was the following:

Religious composition of Yakoruda Municipality
Orthodox Christianity	18.1%
Catholicism	0.1%
Protestantism	0.2%
Islam	76.9%
No religion	0.4%
Prefer not to answer, others and indefinable	4.3%
