= Tourism in Bulgaria =

Location of World Heritage Sites within Bulgaria

Tourism in Bulgaria is a significant contributor to the country's economy. Situated at the crossroads of the East and West, Bulgaria has been home to many civilizations: Thracians, Greeks, Romans, Eastern Romans or Byzantines, Slavs, Bulgars, and Ottomans. The country is rich in tourist sights and historical artifacts, scattered through a relatively small and easily accessible territory. Bulgaria is internationally known for its seaside and winter resorts.

Bulgaria attracted over 13 million foreign tourists in 2024, according to the latest data from the National Statistics Institute. Tourists from five countries (Romania, Turkey, Greece, Germany and United Kingdom) account for approximately 50% of all visitors. The sector contributed to 15% of GDP and supported 150,000 workplaces in 2014.

== Statistics ==
Yearly tourist arrivals in millions

=== Arrivals by country ===
Most visitors arriving in Bulgaria on short-term basis came from the following countries of nationality:

Rank	Country	2025	2024	2023	2019	2018	2017	2016		
1	Romania		2,622,595	2,332,357	2,106,097	3,400,340	2,035,606	1,943,436	1,743,697	
2	Turkey		2,424,392	2,286,711	2,200,341	1,628,231	1,534,809	1,437,276	1,312,895	
3	Greece			1,355,194	1,190,898	1,109,412	1,277,610	1,290,313	1,272,997	1,157,062
4	Ukraine		913,887	1,278,753	1,181,911	596,993	487,400	388,645	342,214	
5	Germany		1,018,269	920,368	897,480	1,245,400	1,063,502	1,046,219	1,003,030	
6	Serbia		728,980	643,488	679,336	632,902	541,303	490,668		
7	Poland		477,751	467,505	445,316	474,984	424,724	388,833		
8	North Macedonia		406,199	425,012	670,450	609,591	583,026	562,365		
9	United Kingdom		398,267	399,455	589,342	424,384	352,054	281,777		
10	Czech Republic		206,202	198,727	214,550	236,265	209,218	219,349		
11	Austria		198,267	183,926	214,179	217,541	216,986	204,489		
12	France		197,888	200,950	250,014	260,099	231,348	195,571		
13	Netherlands		197,520	185,584	176,122	193,362	183,755	147,882		
14	Italy		180,958	181,514	167,658	181,770	177,250	152,078		
15	Israel		163,653	206,570	246,404	245,567	209,304	183,846		
16	Belgium		136,887	128,725	155,367	170,146	152,739	119,429		
17	Spain		116,087	86,655	-	-	-	-		
18	Hungary		98,449	99,704	111,132	102,956	111,405	118,805		
19	Russia		85,035	139,799	460,770	522,085	565,754	589,844		
20	United States		82,914	114,593	109,283	101,220	90,963	82,465		
Total			13,249,456	12,627,547	14,450,400	11,596,167	10,604,396	9,316,624		

== Tourist attractions ==
=== UNESCO World Heritage Sites and Intangible Cultural Heritage List ===
There are ten UNESCO World Heritage Sites in Bulgaria. The first four properties were inscribed in the World Heritage List in 1979, and the last in 2017. Bulgaria currently has sixteen additional properties on the Tentative List. Nestinarstvo, a ritual fire-dance of Thracian origin, is included in the list of UNESCO Intangible Cultural Heritage.

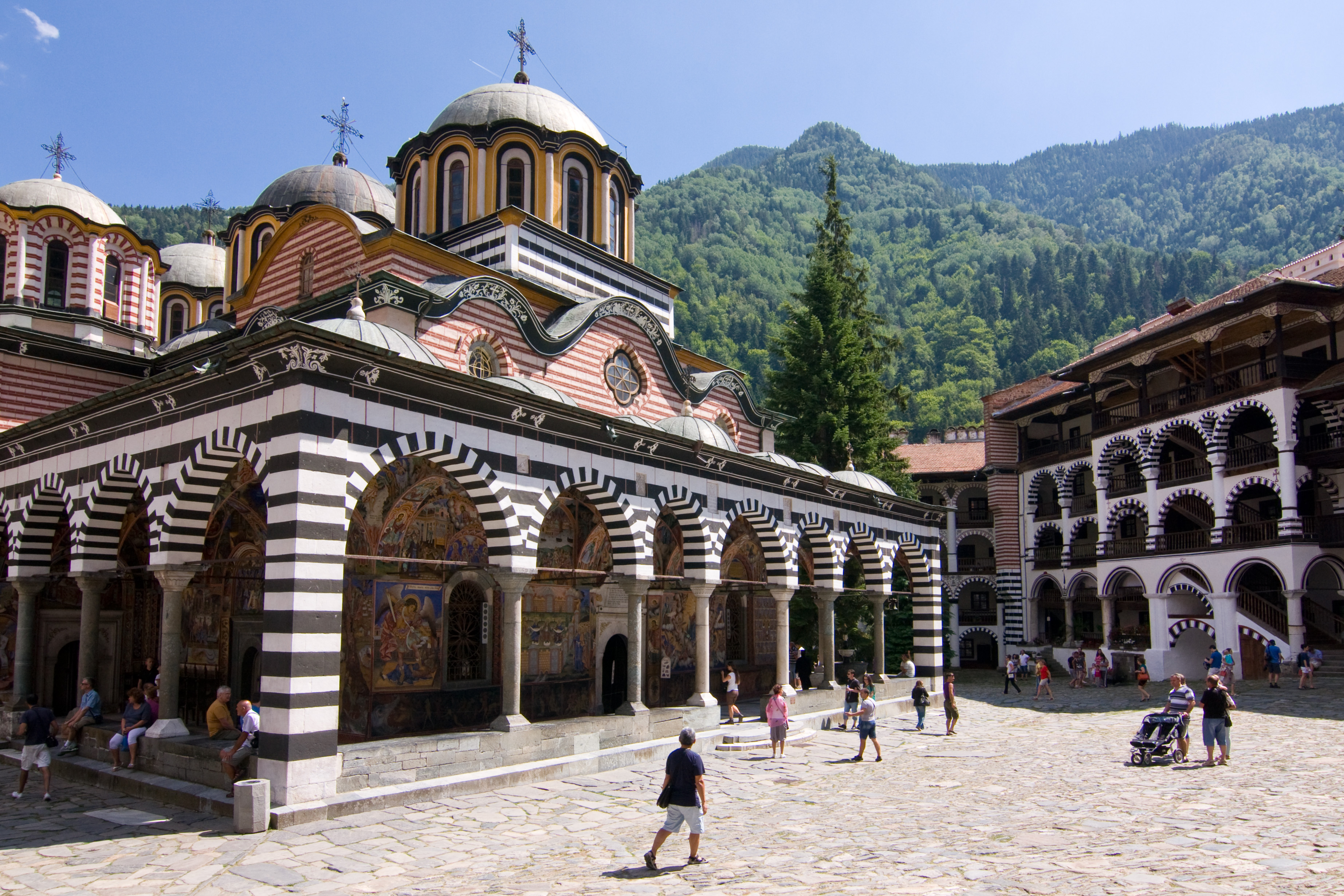
Rila Monastery

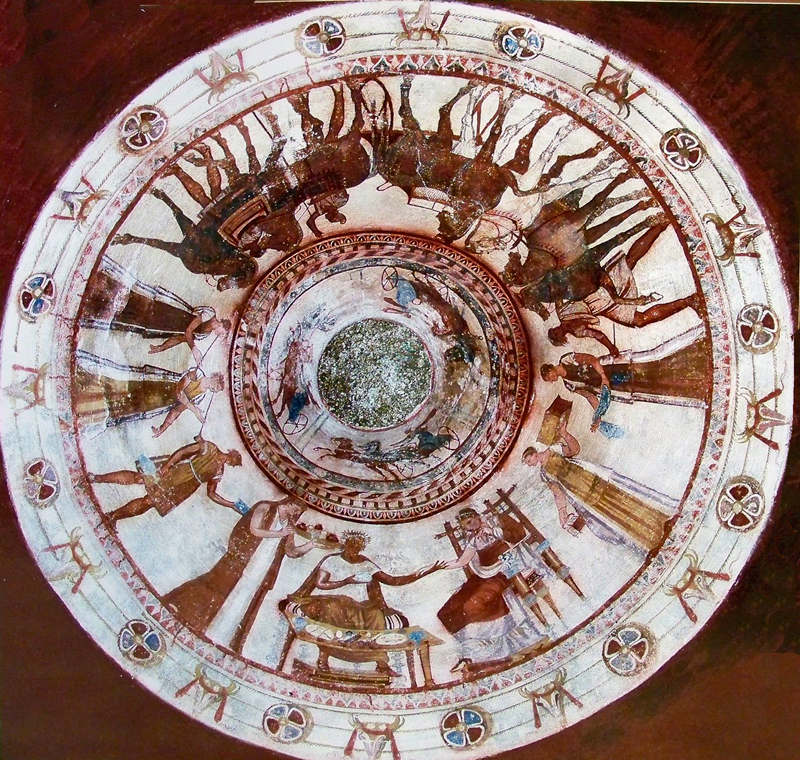
Thracian Tomb of Kazanlak

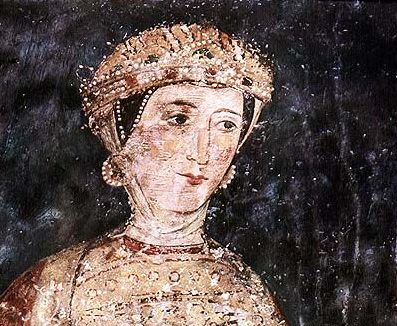
Boyana Church

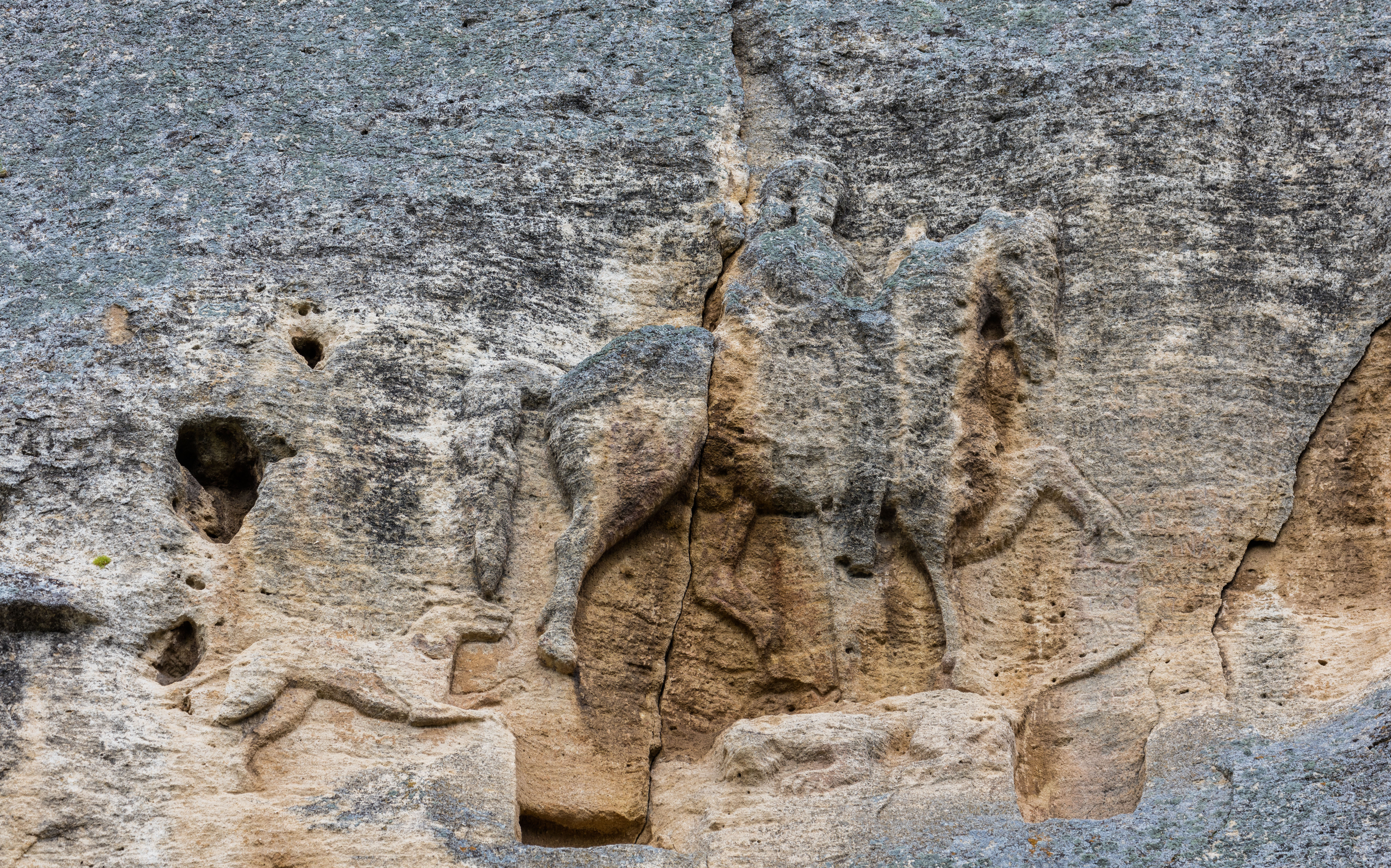
Madara Rider

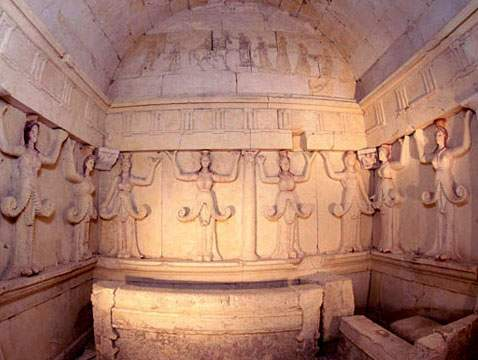
Thracian Tomb of Sveshtari

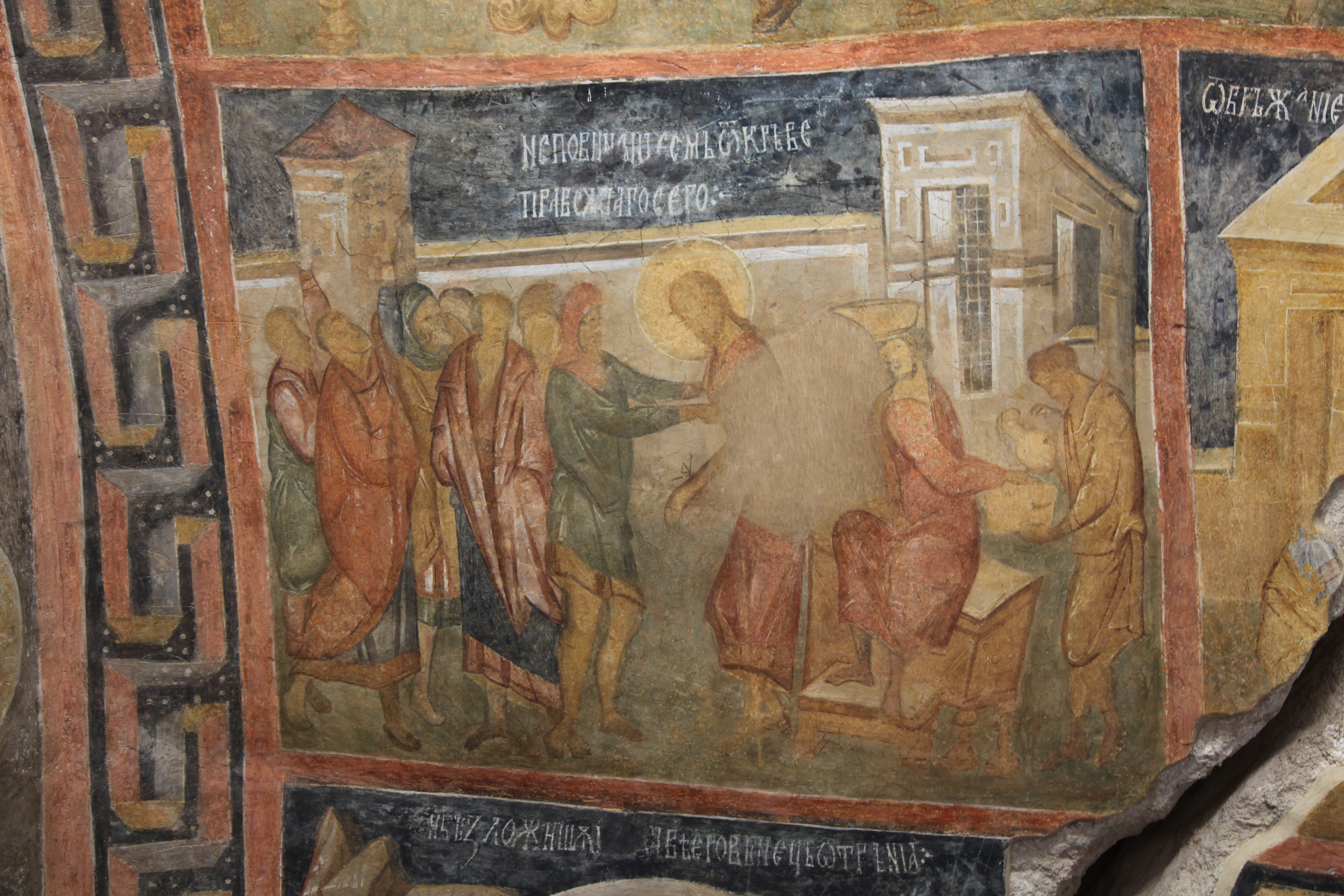
Rock-hewn Churches

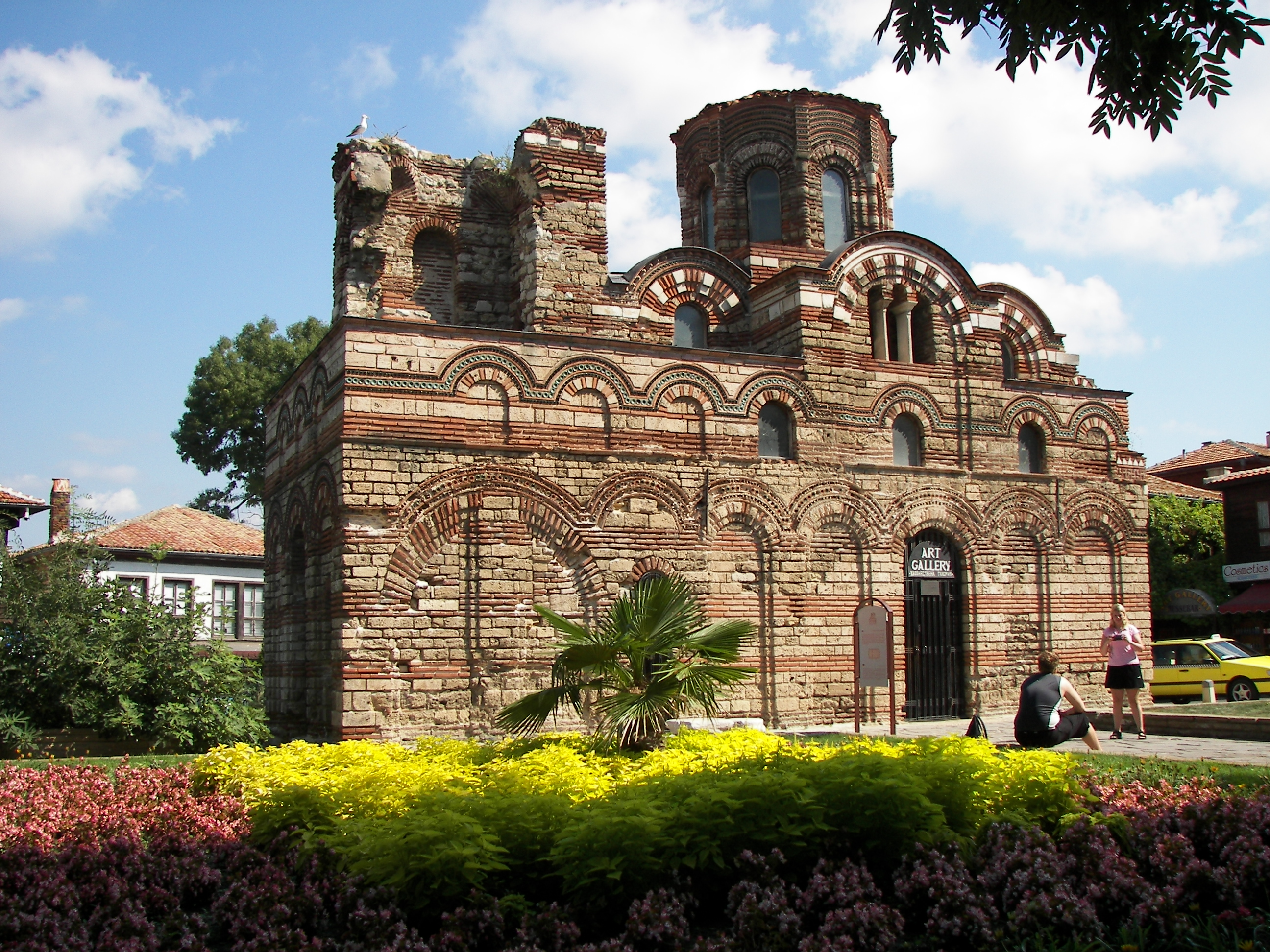
Ancient City of Nessebar

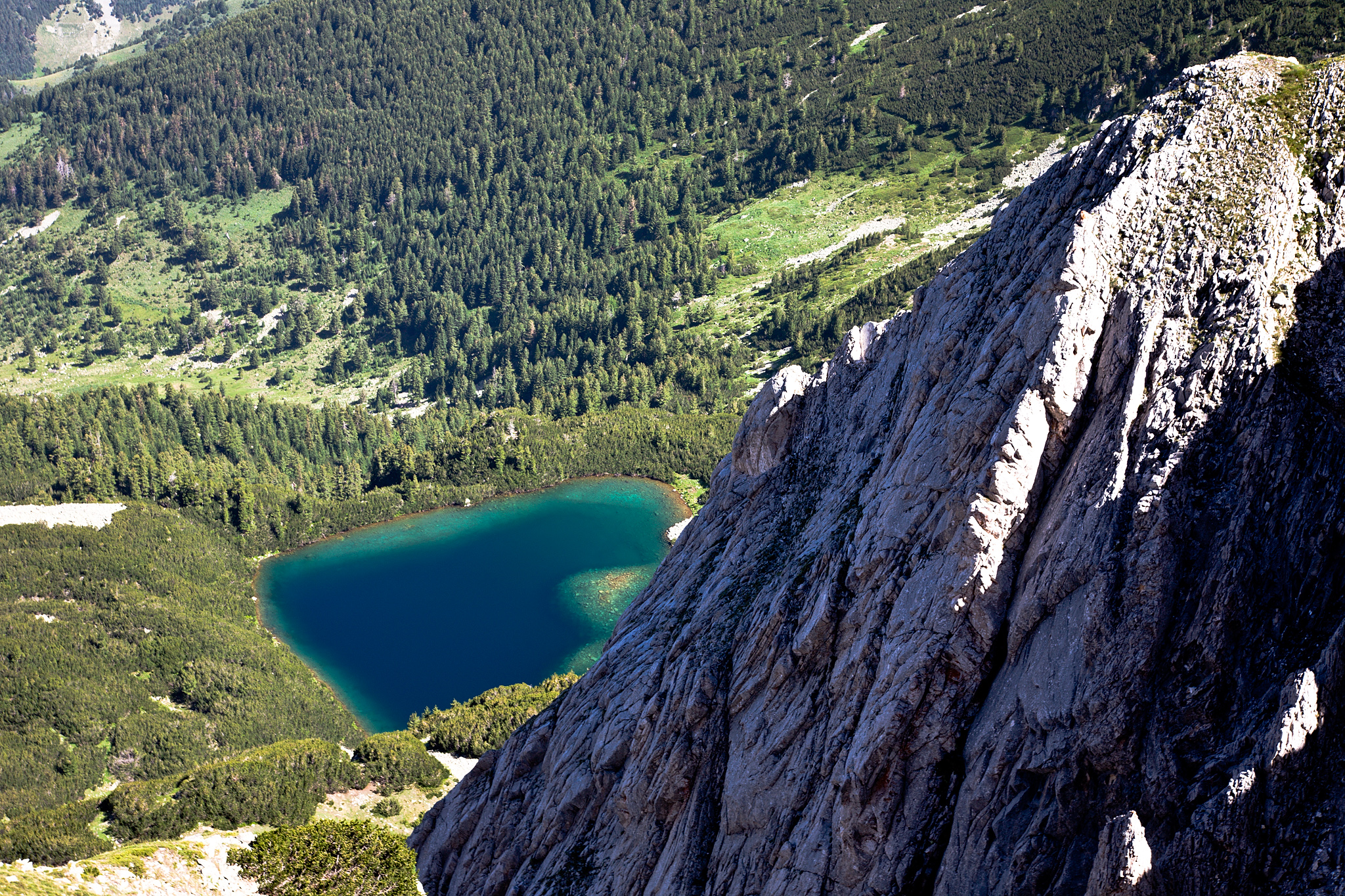
Pirin National Park

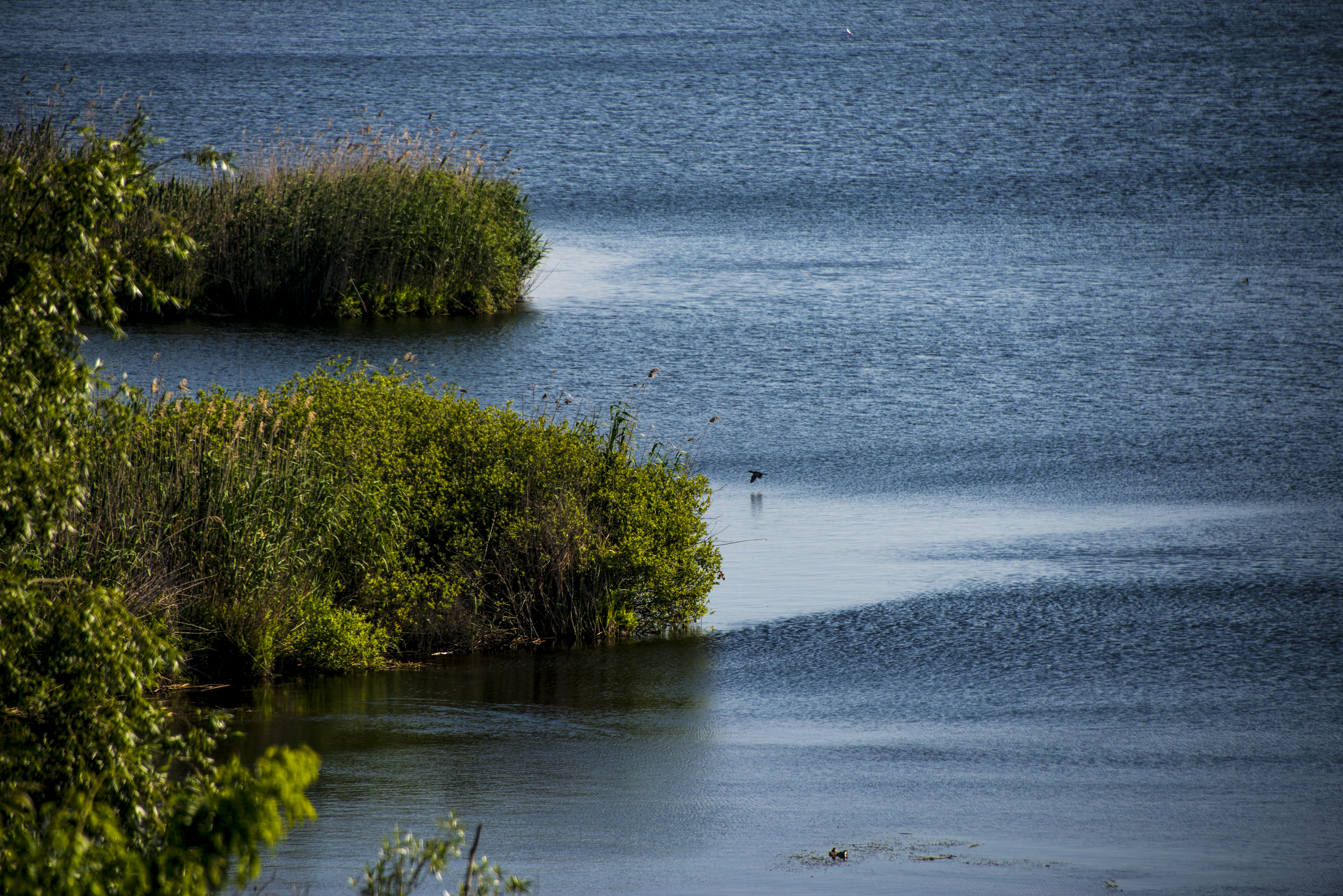
Srebarna Nature Reserve

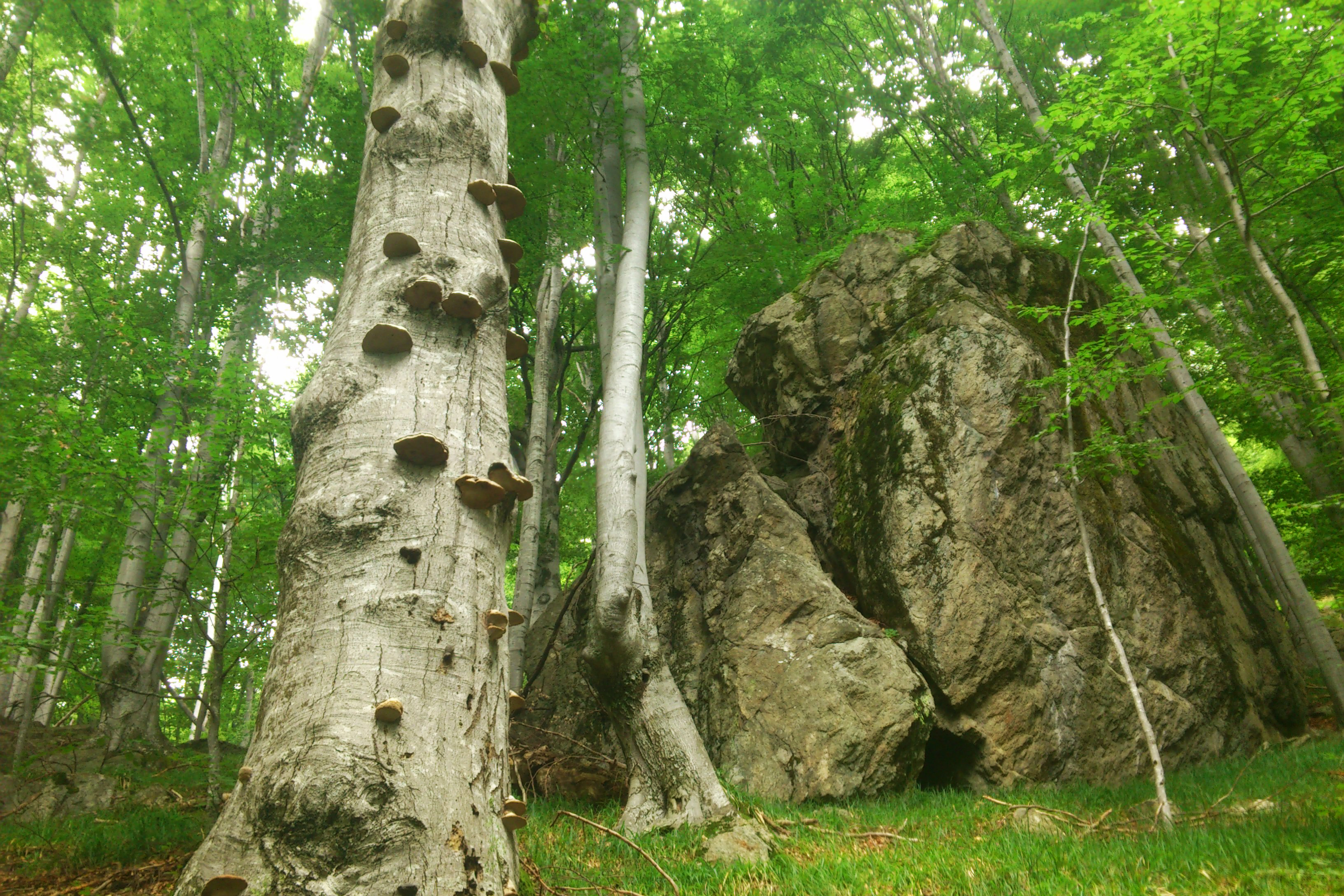
Primeval Beech Forests of the Central Balkans

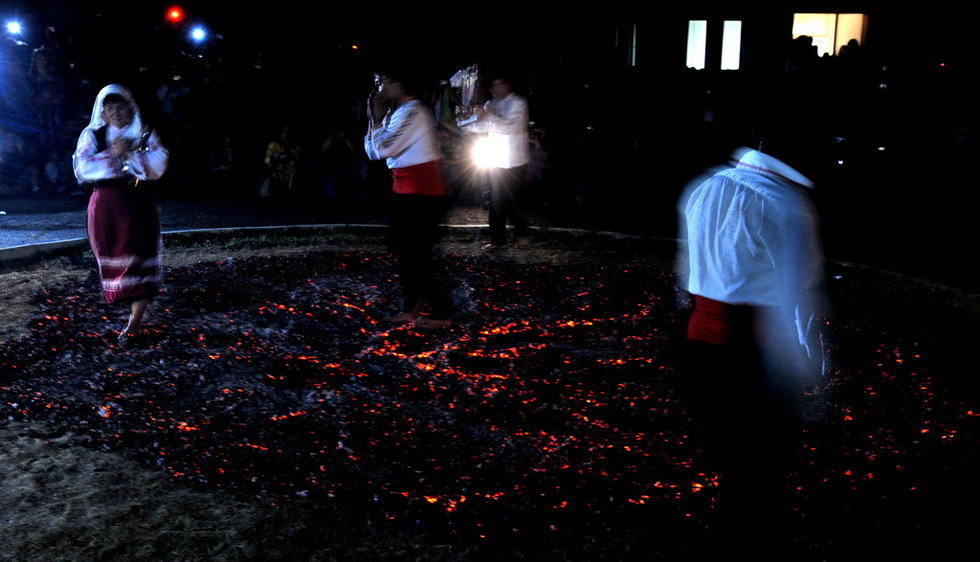
Nestinarstvo

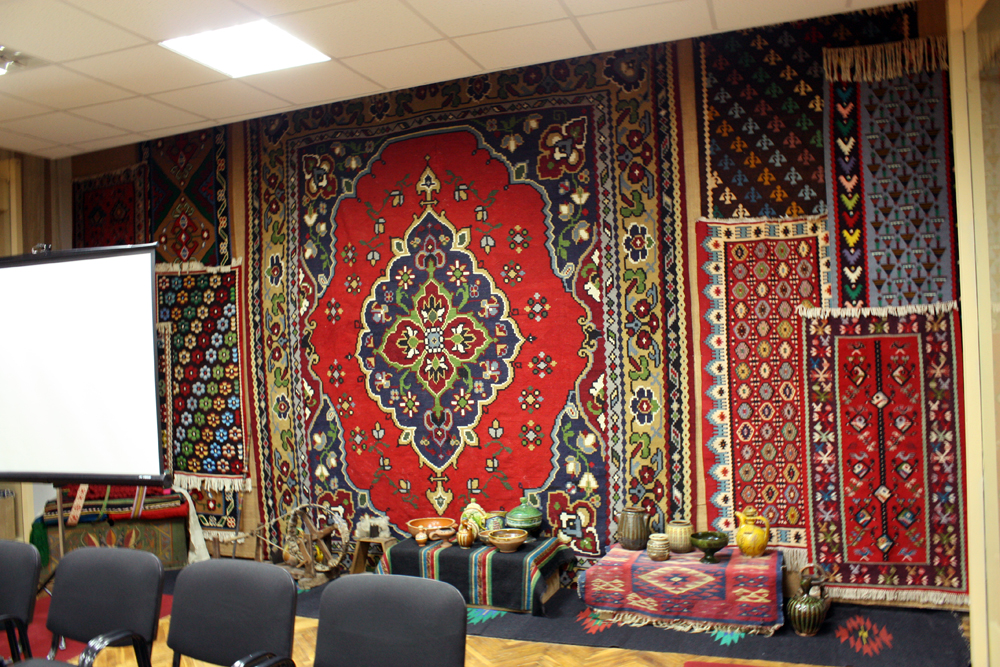
Chiprovtsi carpet

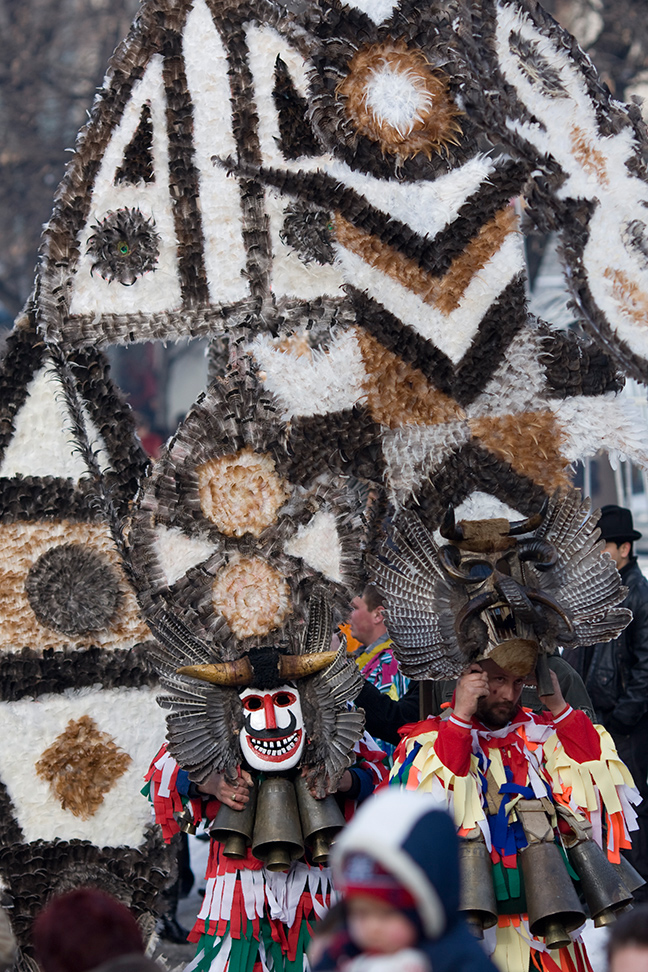
Surva, Masquerade games

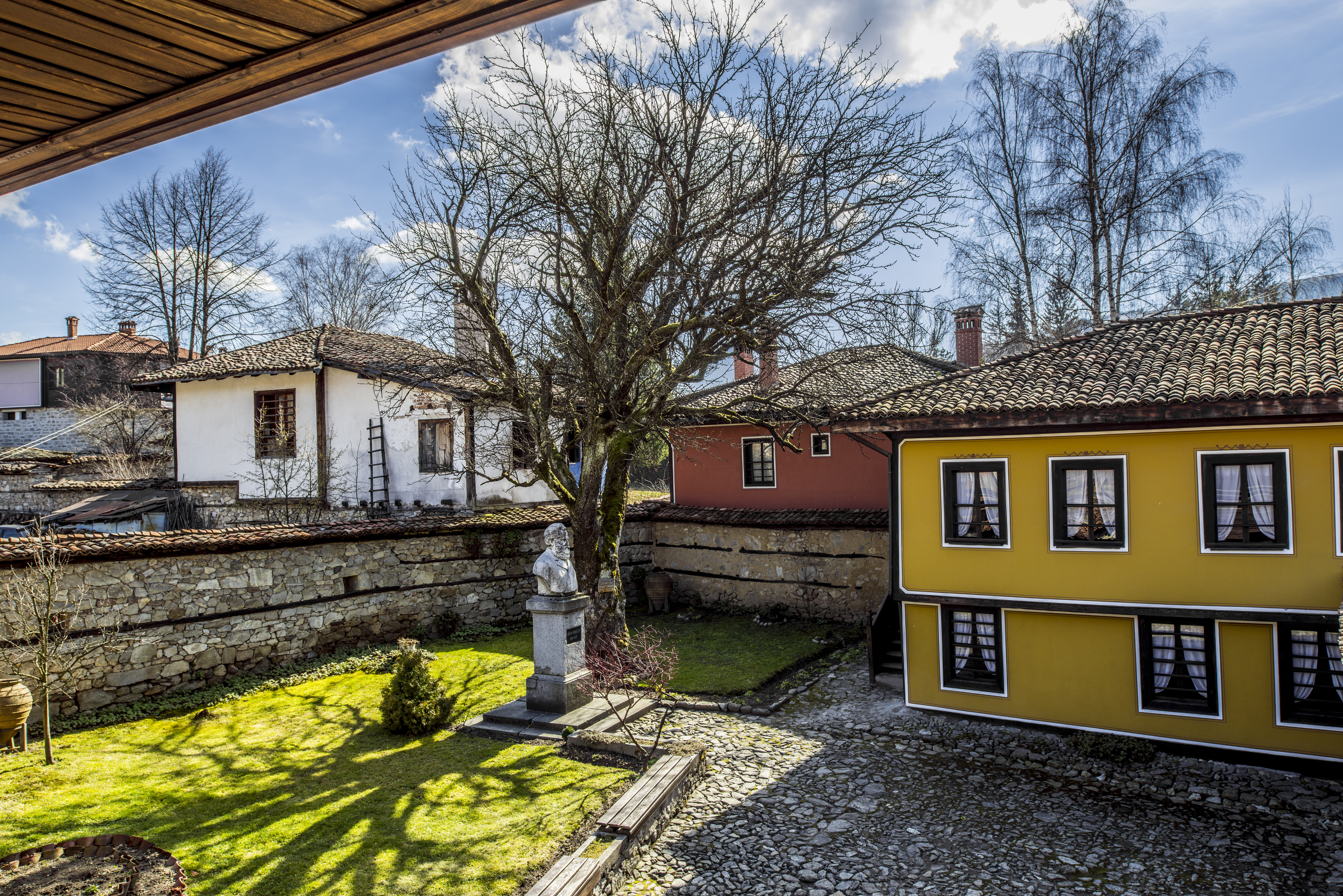
Koprivshtitsa folklore fair

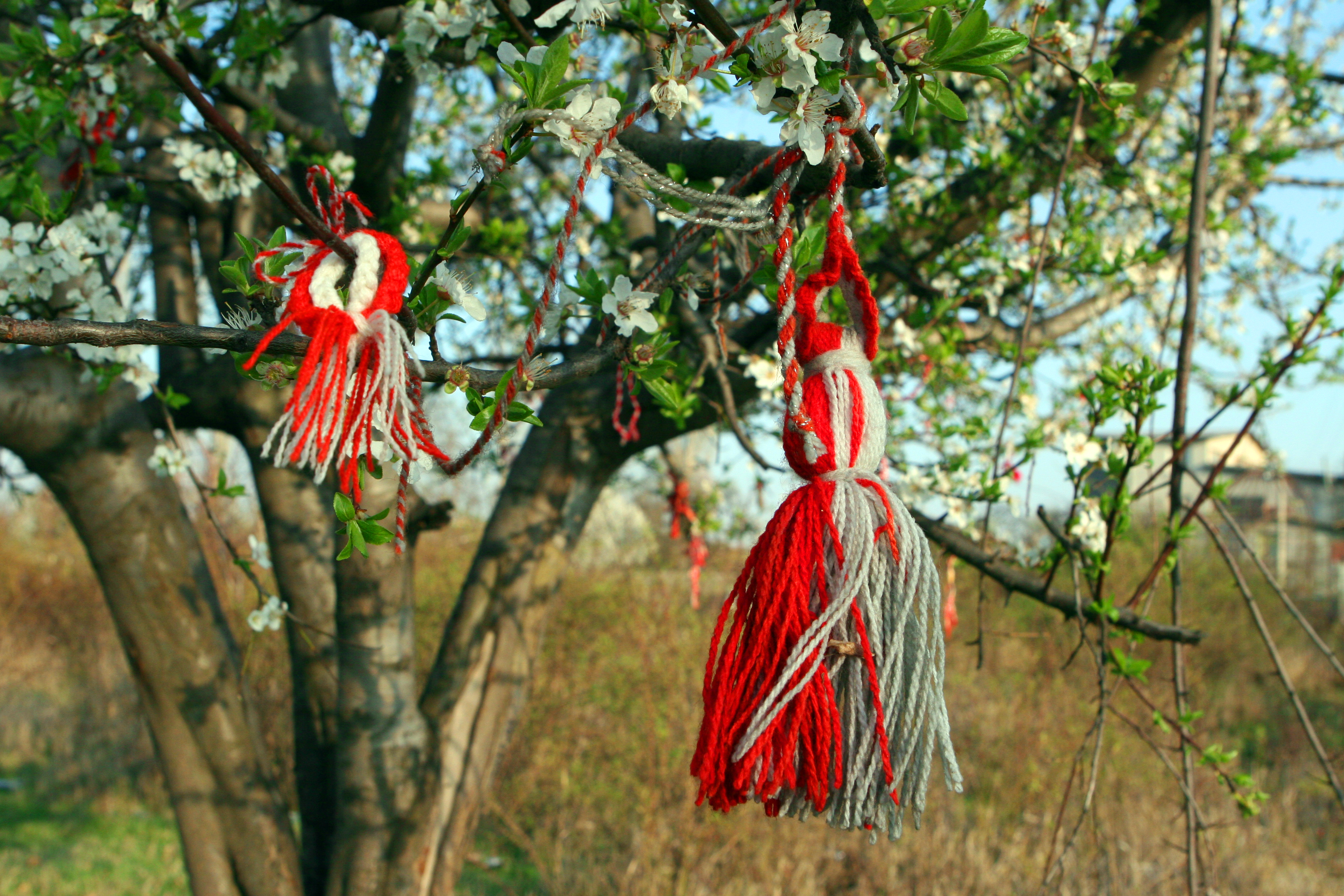
Martenitsa

=== Ethnic, cultural and historical tourism ===
The Bulgarian cultural heritage has many faces and manifestations - archaeological reserves and monuments, museums, galleries, rich cultural calendar, preserved folklore and magnificent architectural monuments.

==== Historical monuments and sites ====
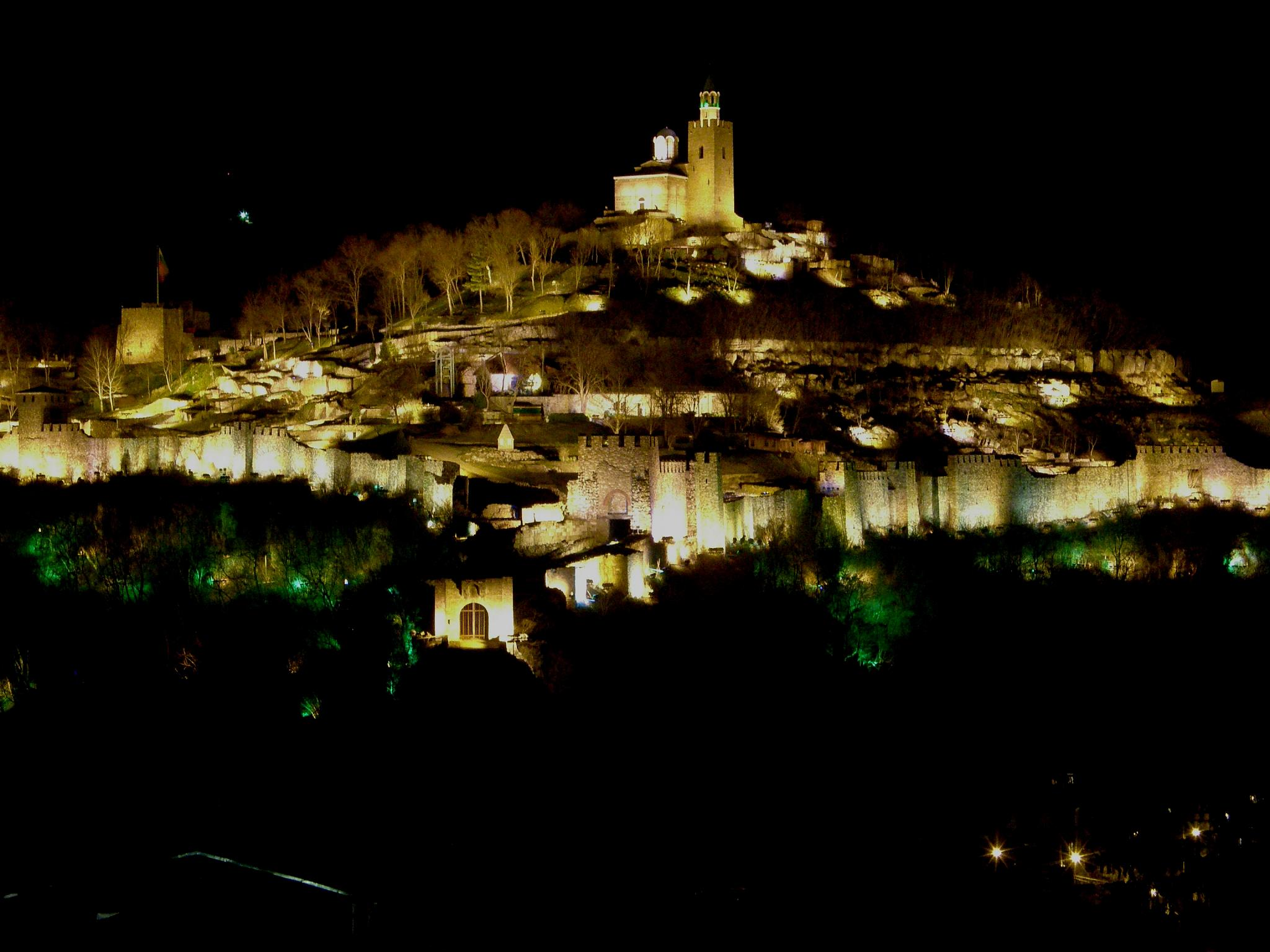
Tsarevets and Veliko Tarnovo

Alexander Nevsky Cathedral

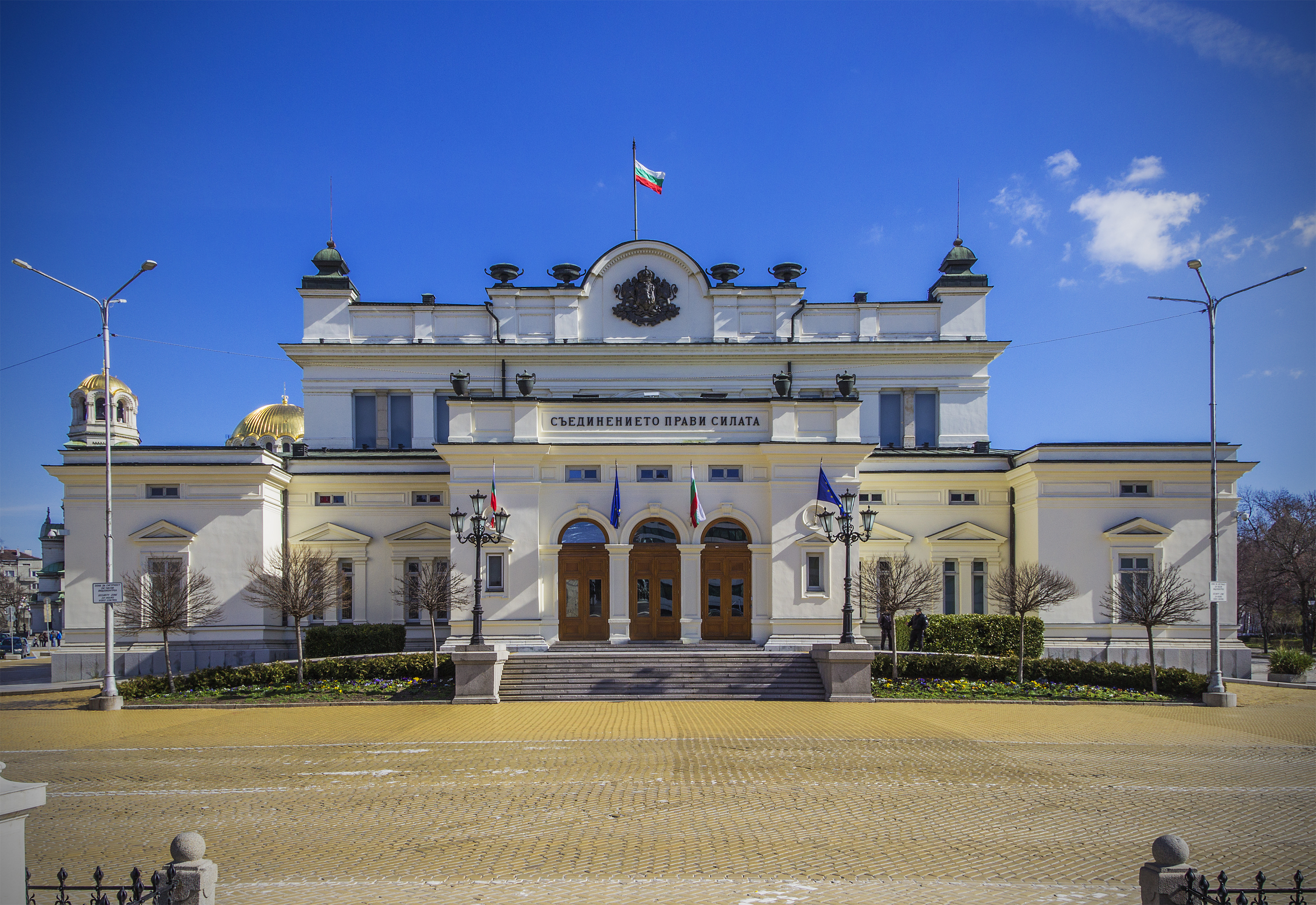
Bulgaria National Assembly

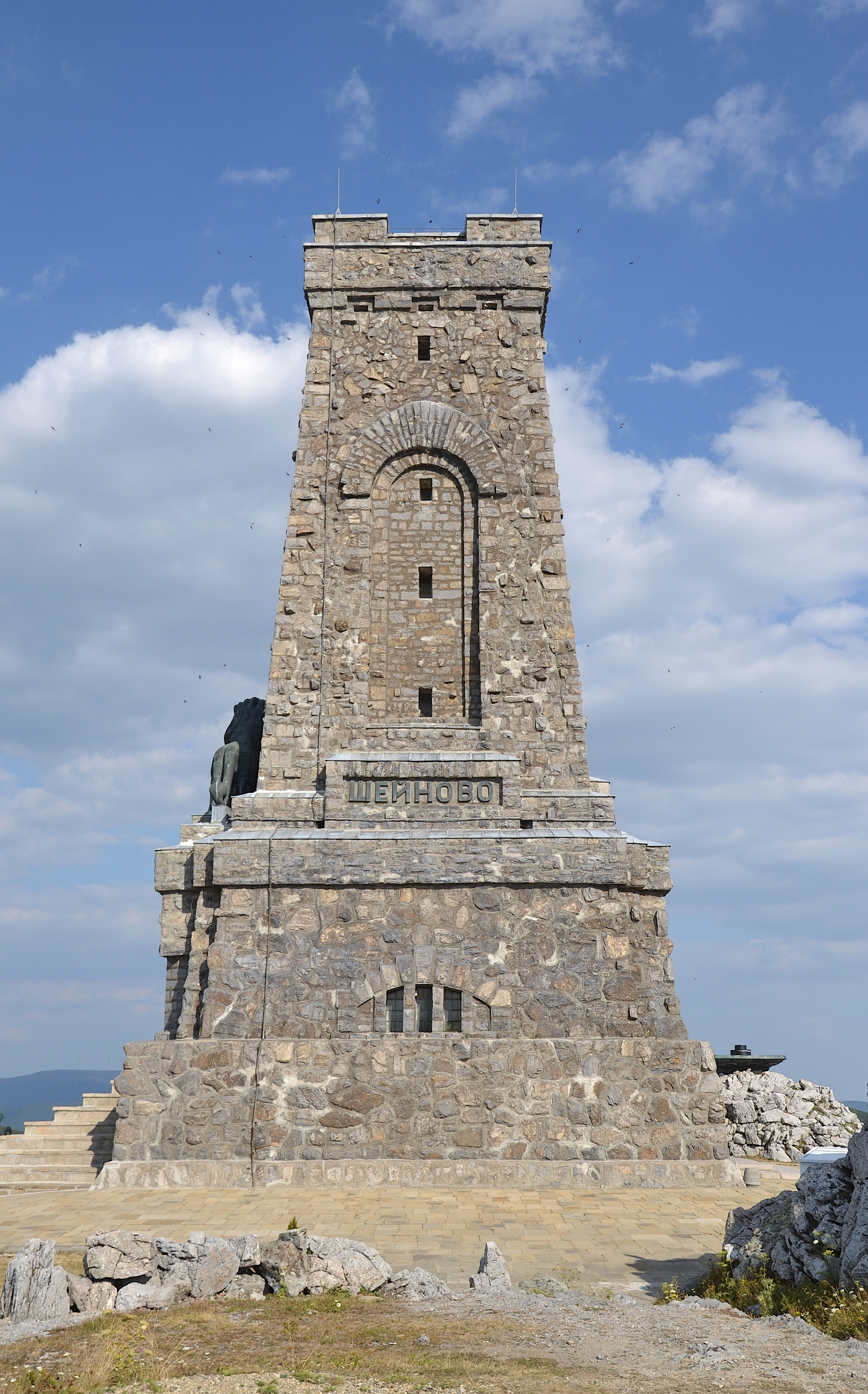
Shipka Memorial

==== Museums ====
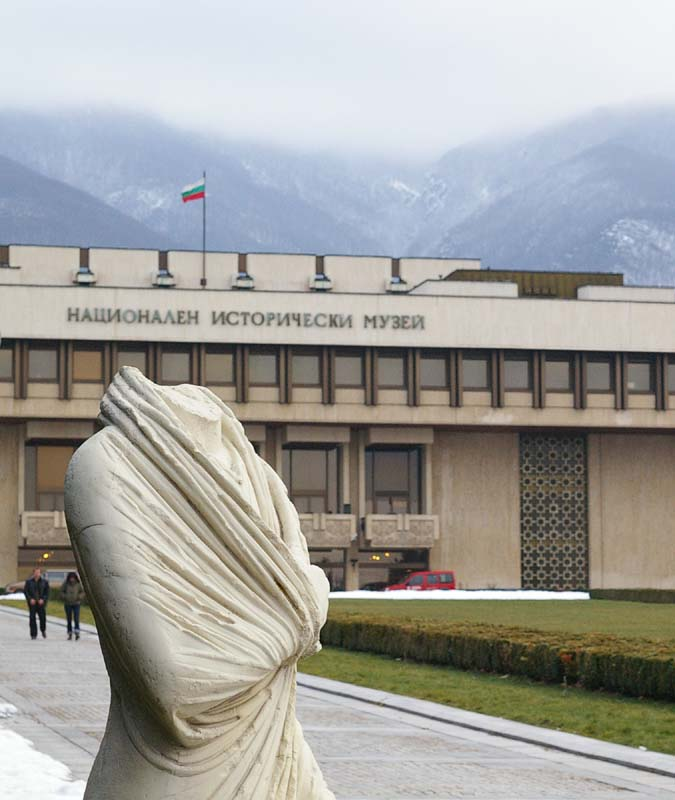
National Historical Museum

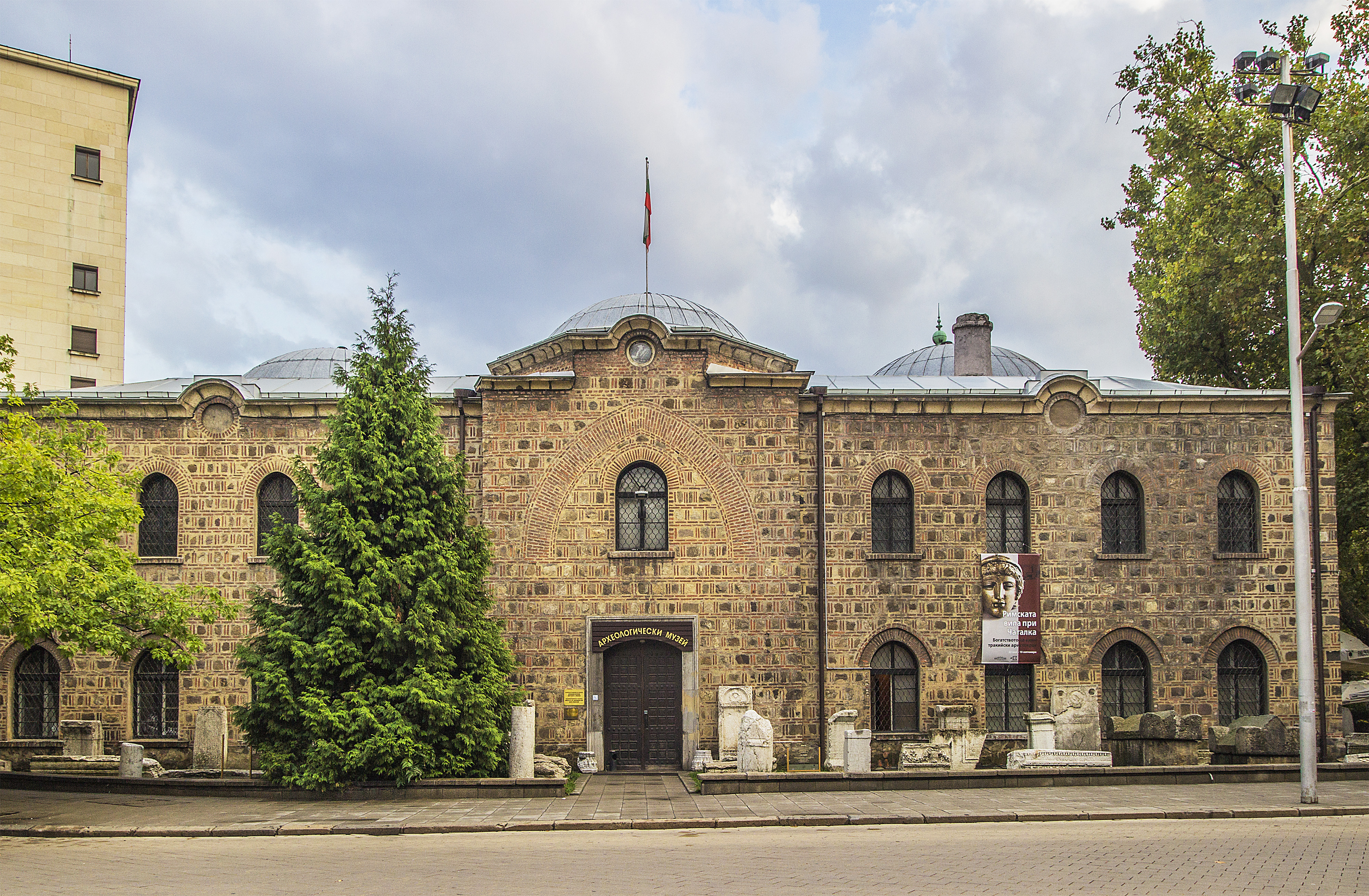
National Archaeological Museum

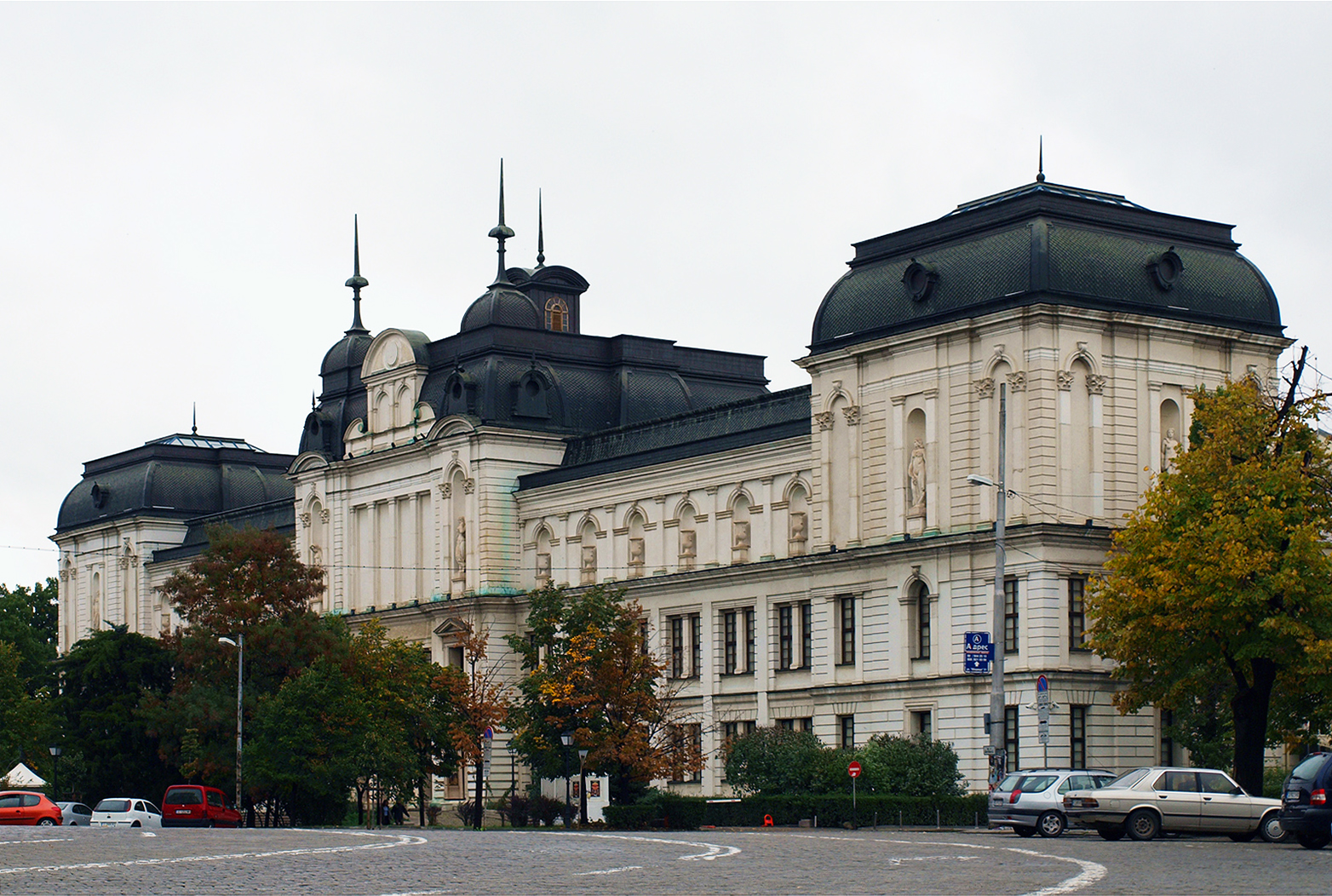
National Gallery for Foreign Art

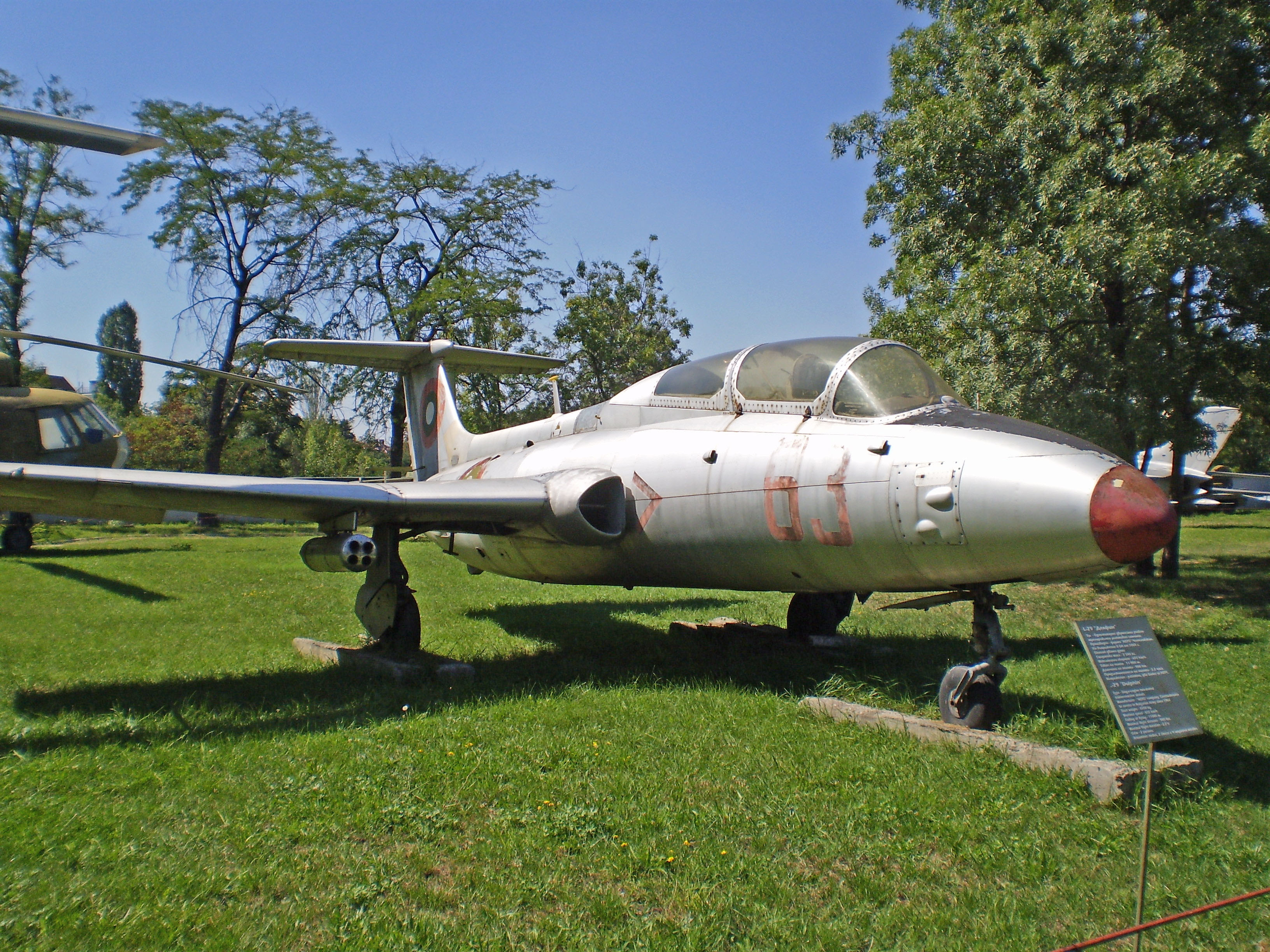
National Museum of Military History

==== Thracian treasures ====
Thracians made beautifully ornate golden and silver objects such as various kinds of vessels, rhytons, facial masks, pectorals, jewelry, weapons, etc. They used to bury rich hoards of precious objects both to hide them in times of enemy invasions and unrest as well as for ritual purposes. To date, more than 80 Thracian treasures have been excavated in Bulgaria which was the cradle of the Thracian civilization.

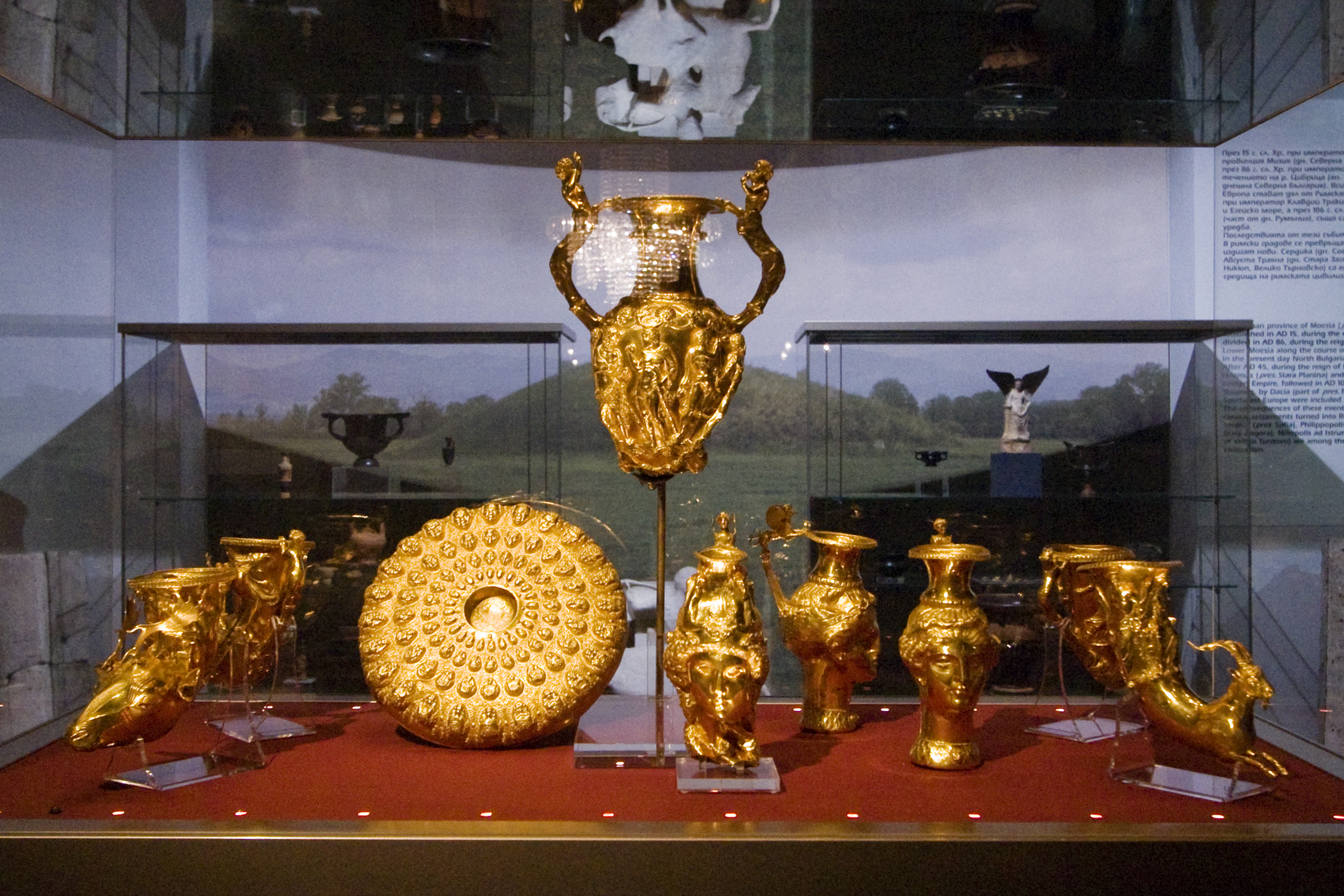
Panagyurishte Treasure

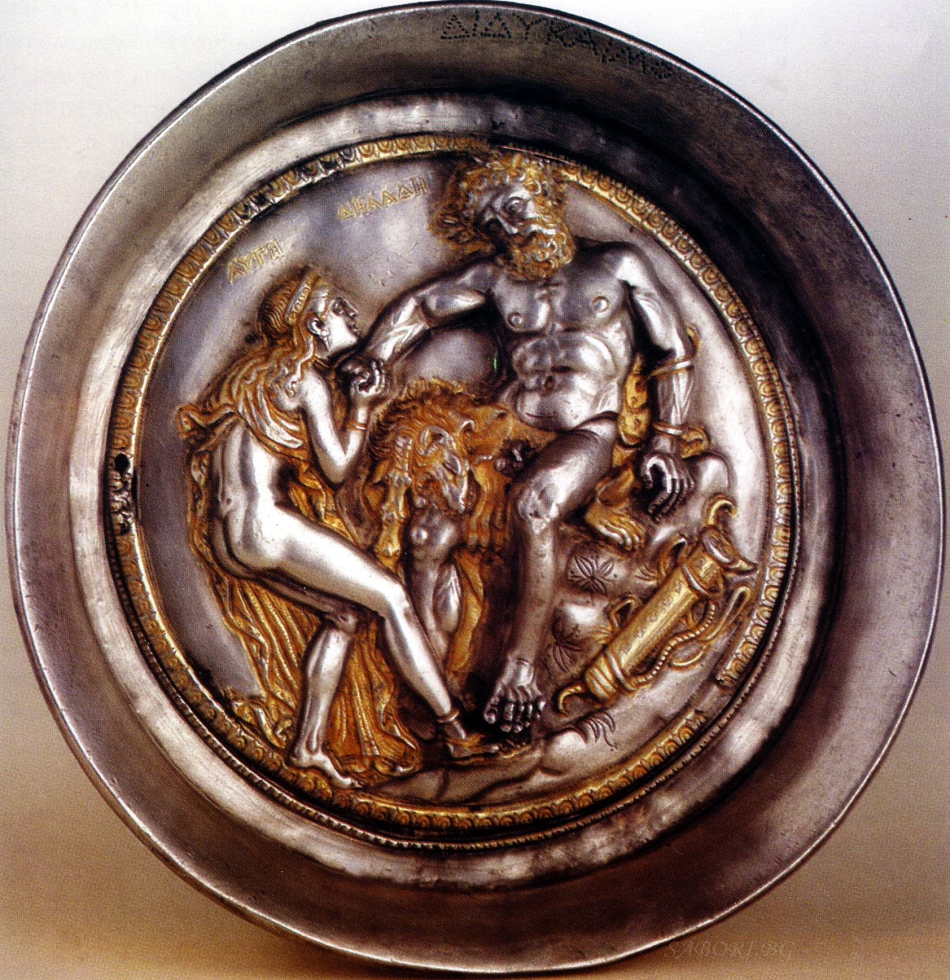
Rogozen Treasure

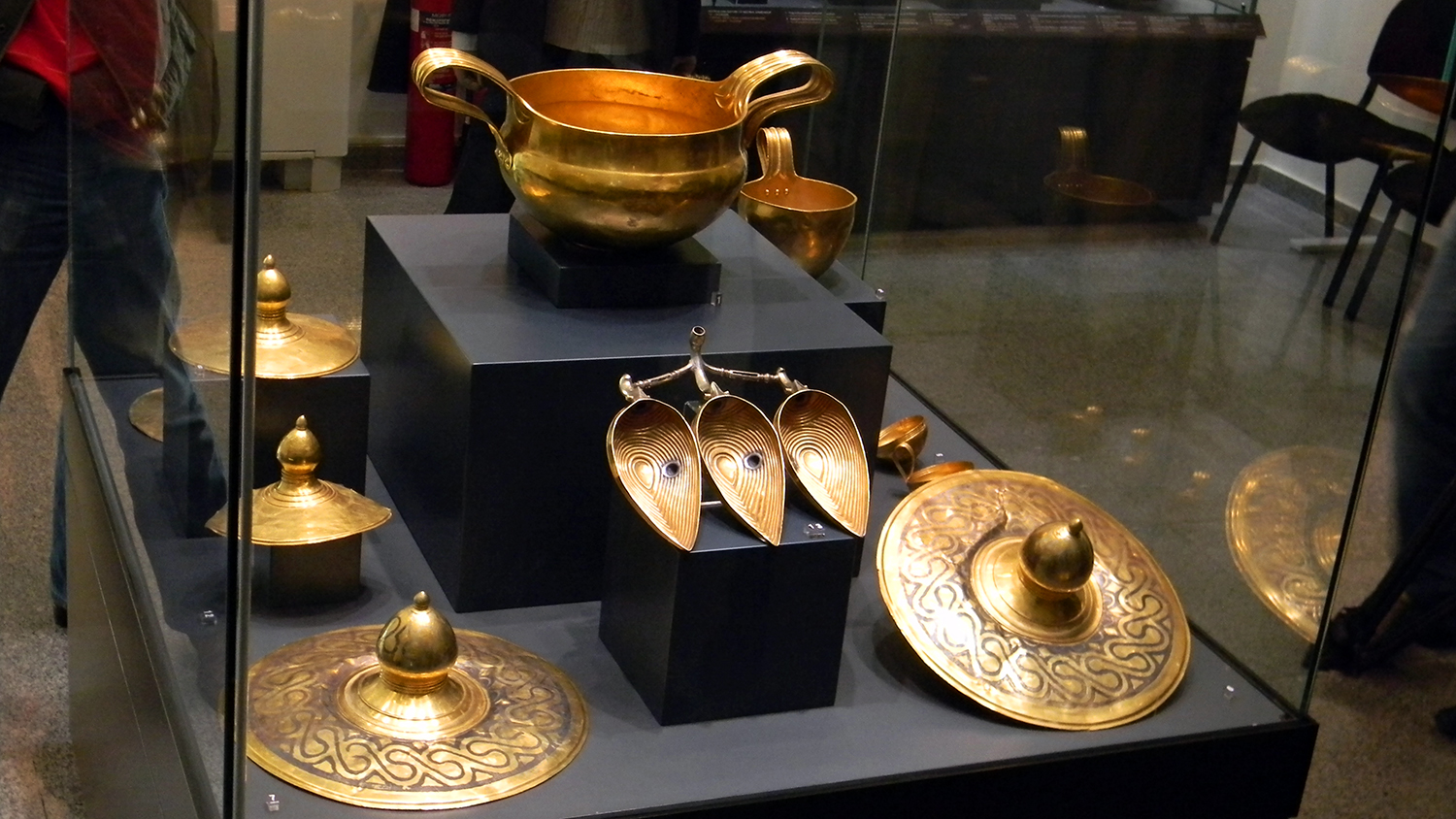
Valchitran Treasure

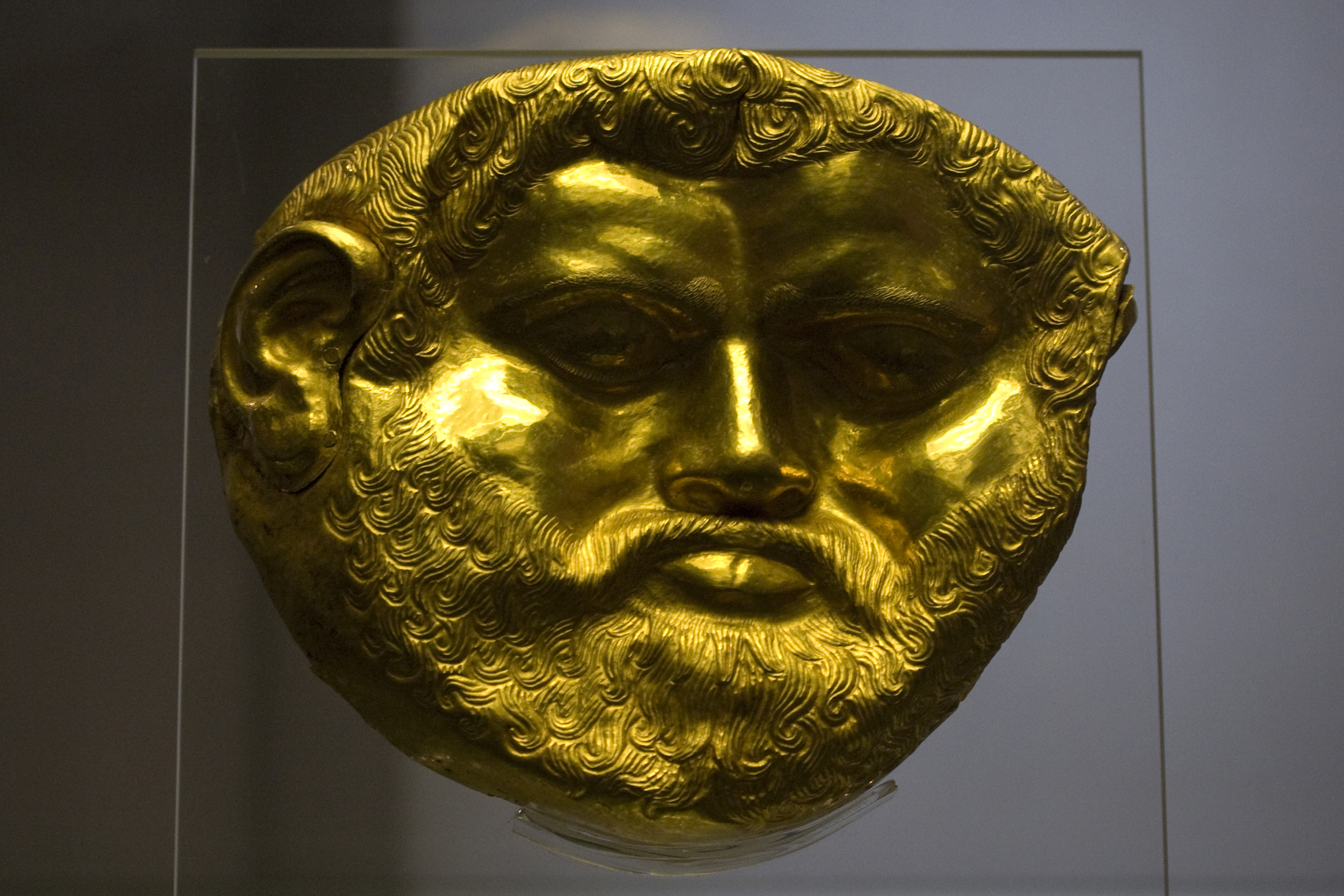
Golden mask of Teres I

==== Rural tourism ====
The Bulgarian town house is an embodiment of the owner's social status, craft and traditions. Many old buildings that demonstrate this type of architecture—e.g. in the villages of Arbanasi, Leshten, Kovachevitsa, Melnik—have been preserved to the present day.

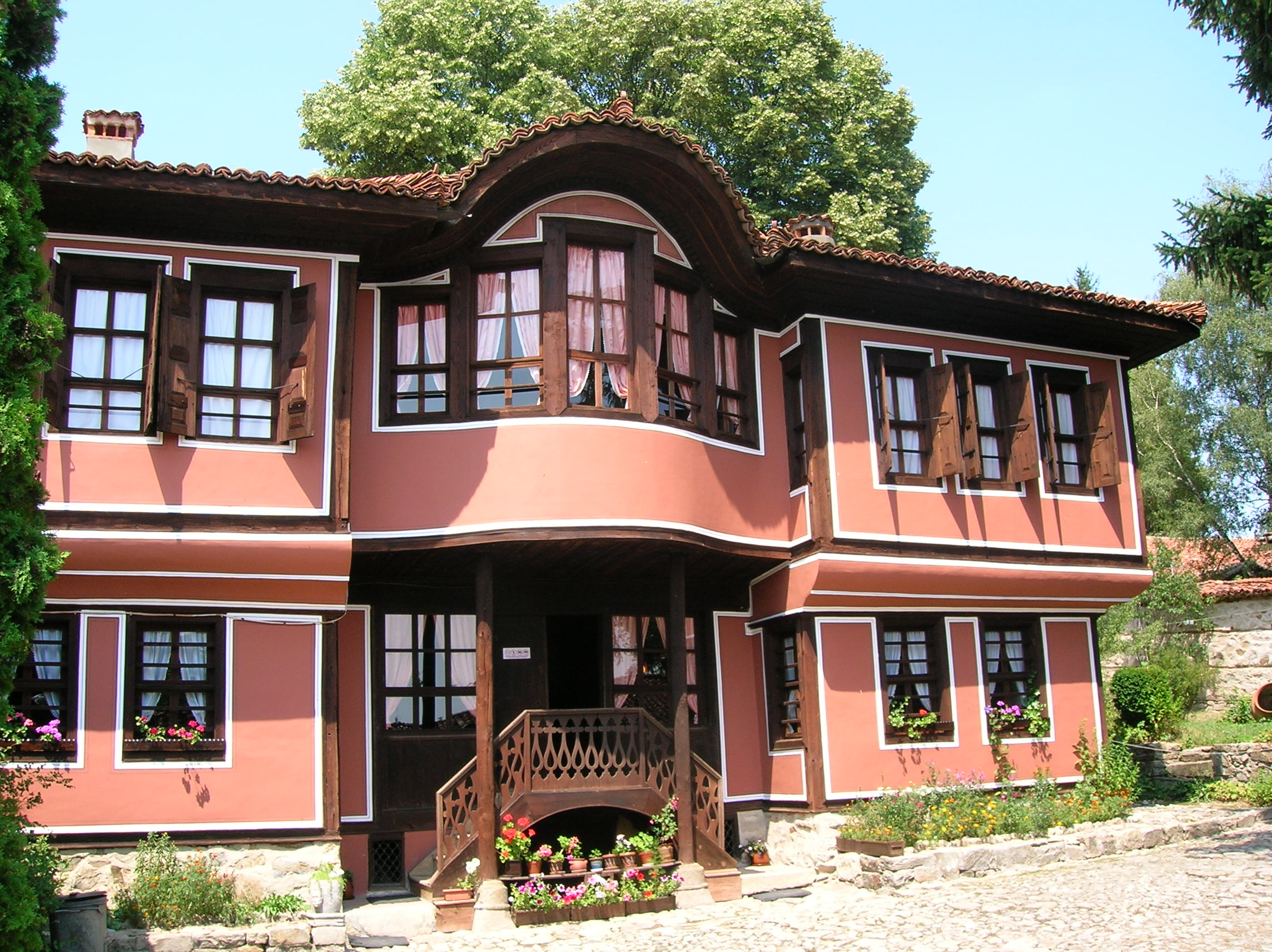
Koprivshtitsa

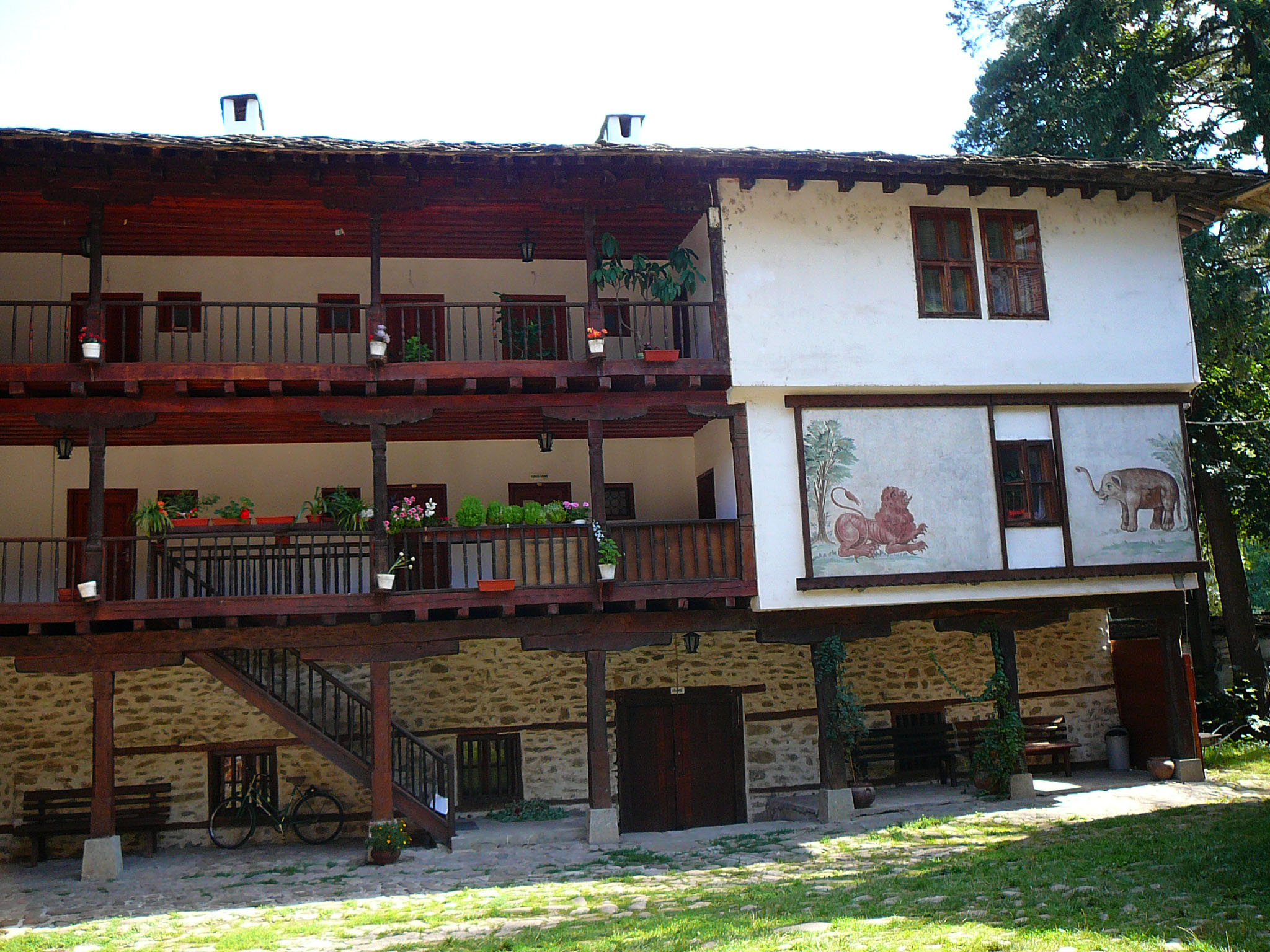
Troyan

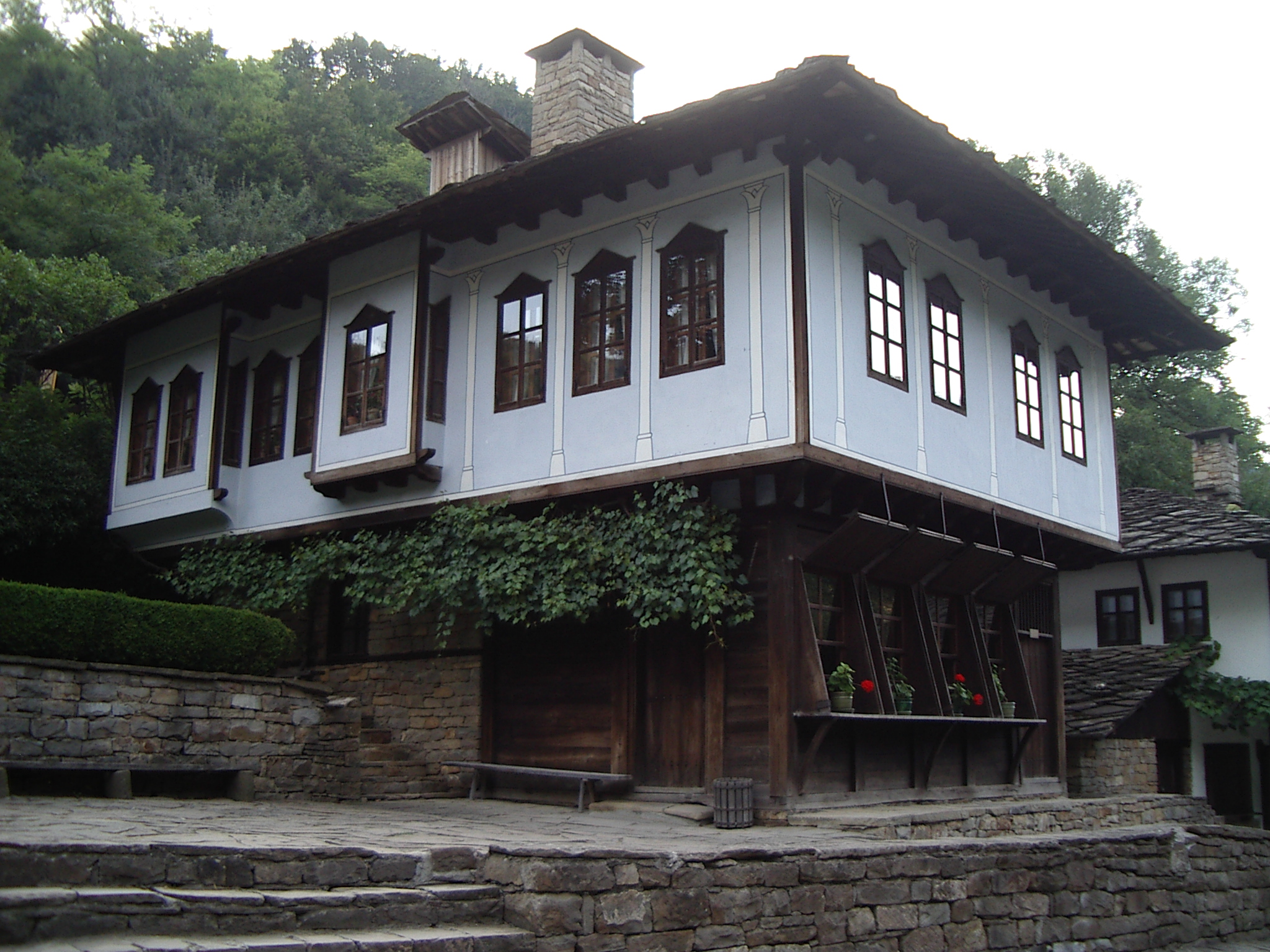
Etar

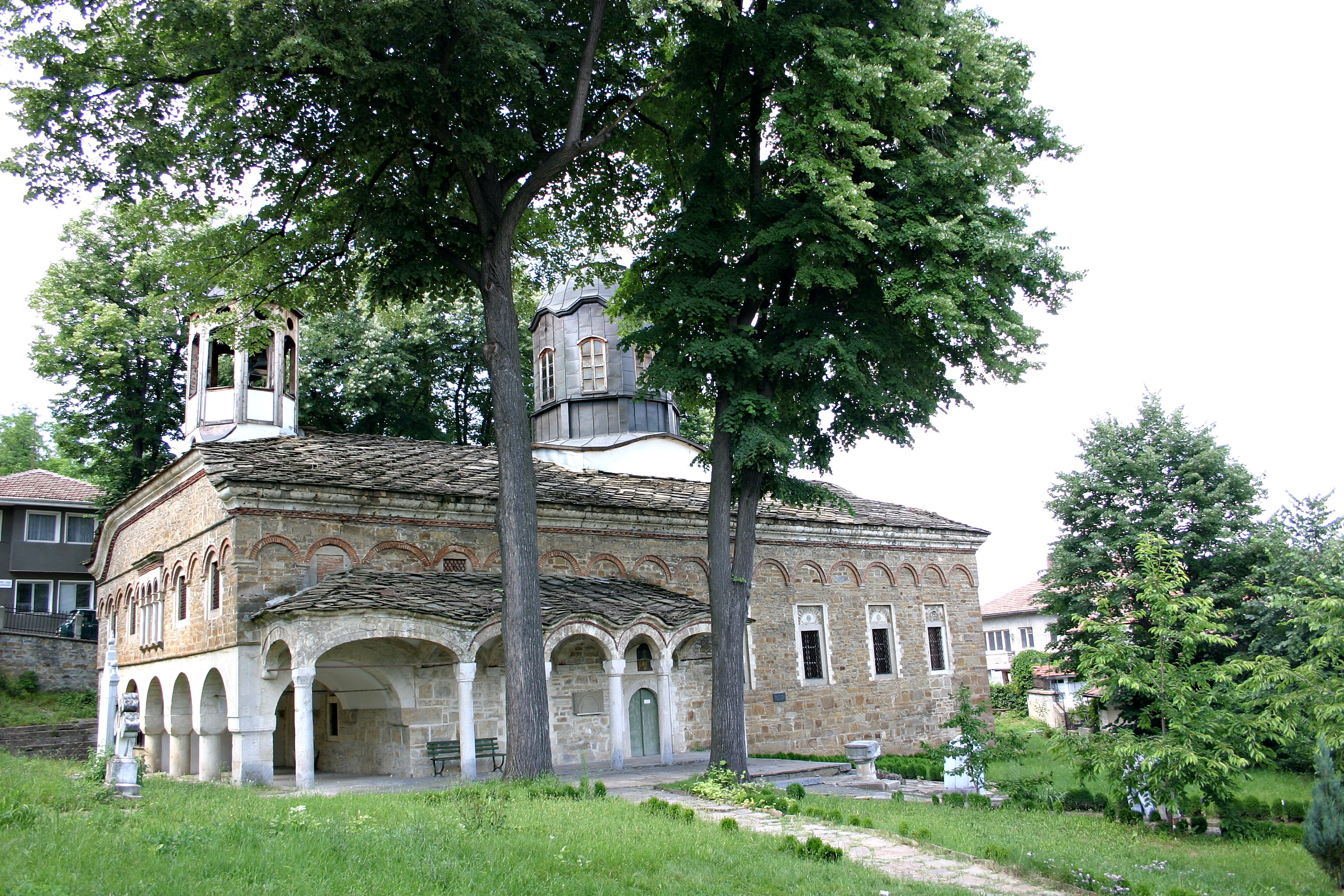
Dryanovo

==== City tourism ====
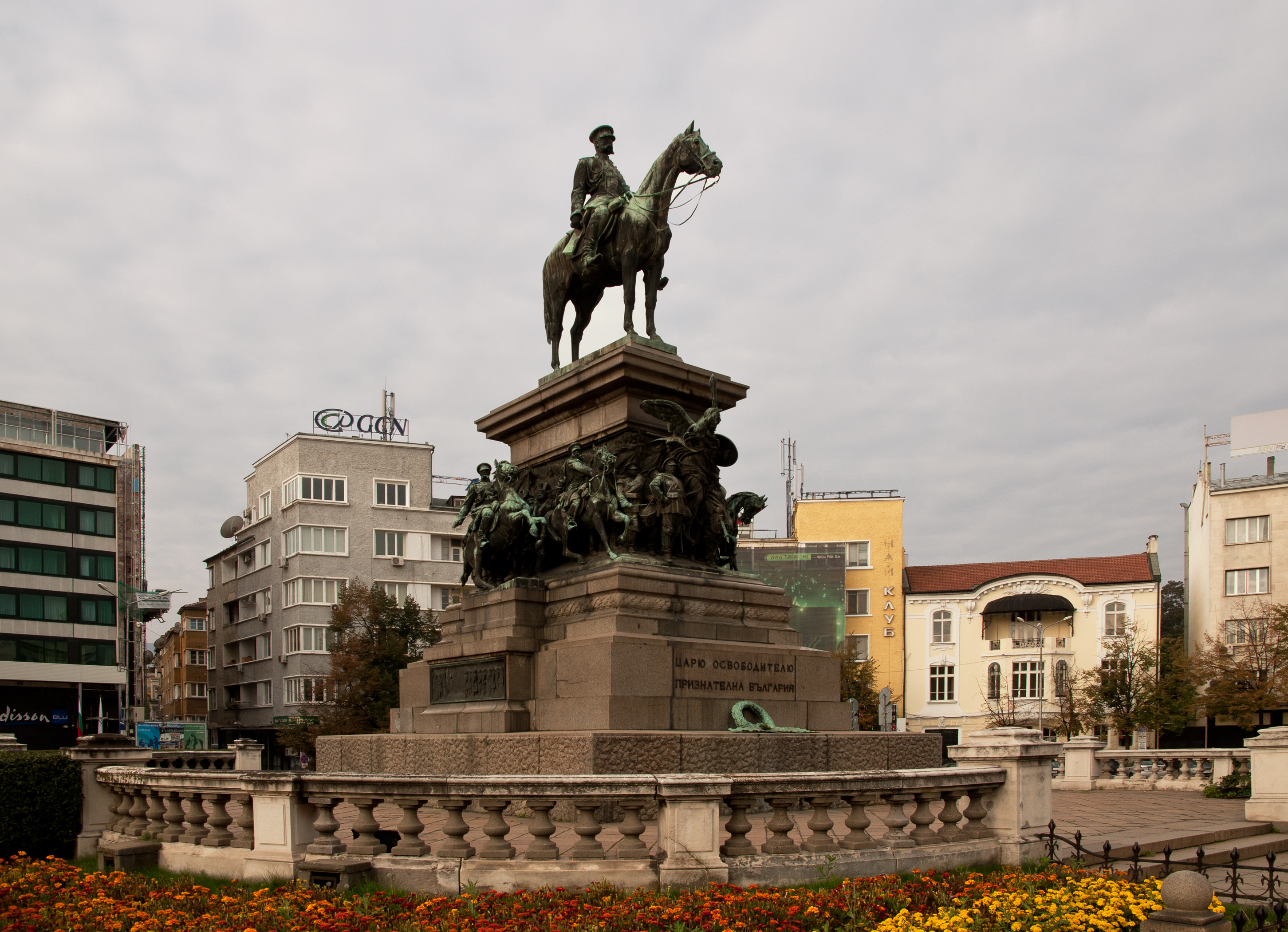
Sofia

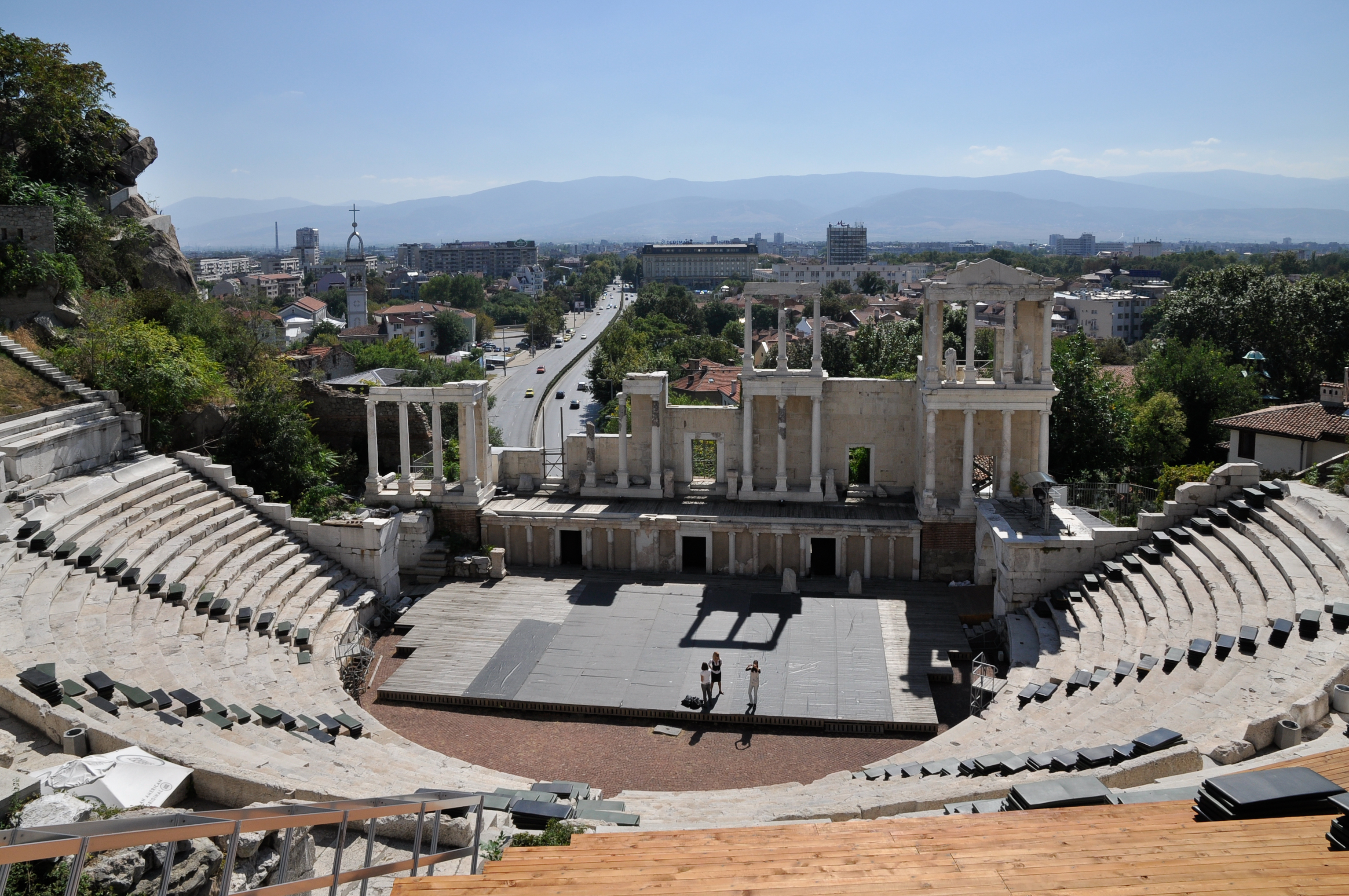
Plovdiv

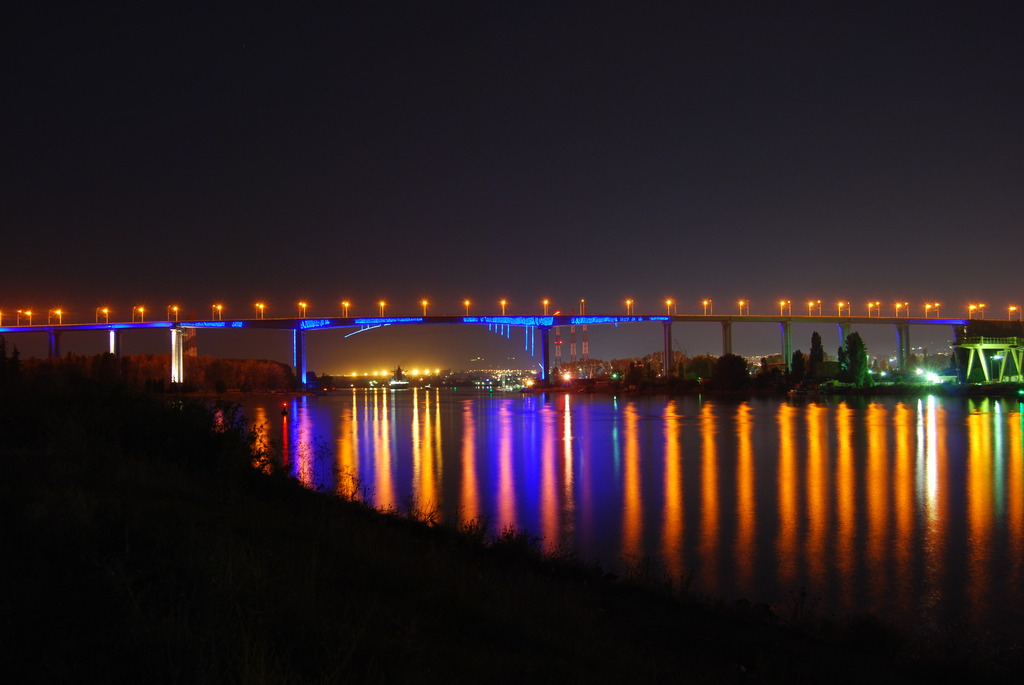
Varna

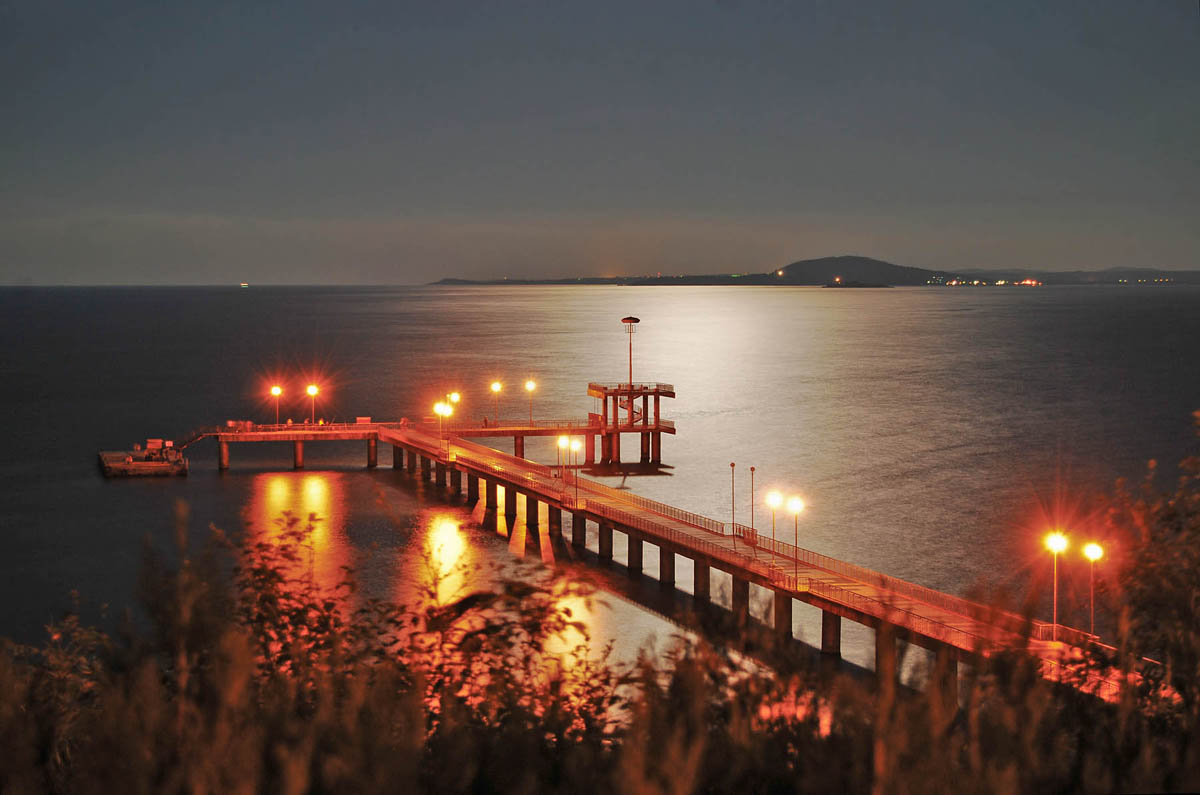
Burgas

==== Monasteries ====
During the 13th and especially during the 14th centuries the construction of monasteries thrived. Due to the troubled times many monasteries resembled fortresses. They usually had rectangular shape, the buildings surrounded a yard in which the main church was located. From the outside they had high stone walls reinforced with counterforts, and from the inside there were galleries with several stores which led towards the dwellings of the monks.

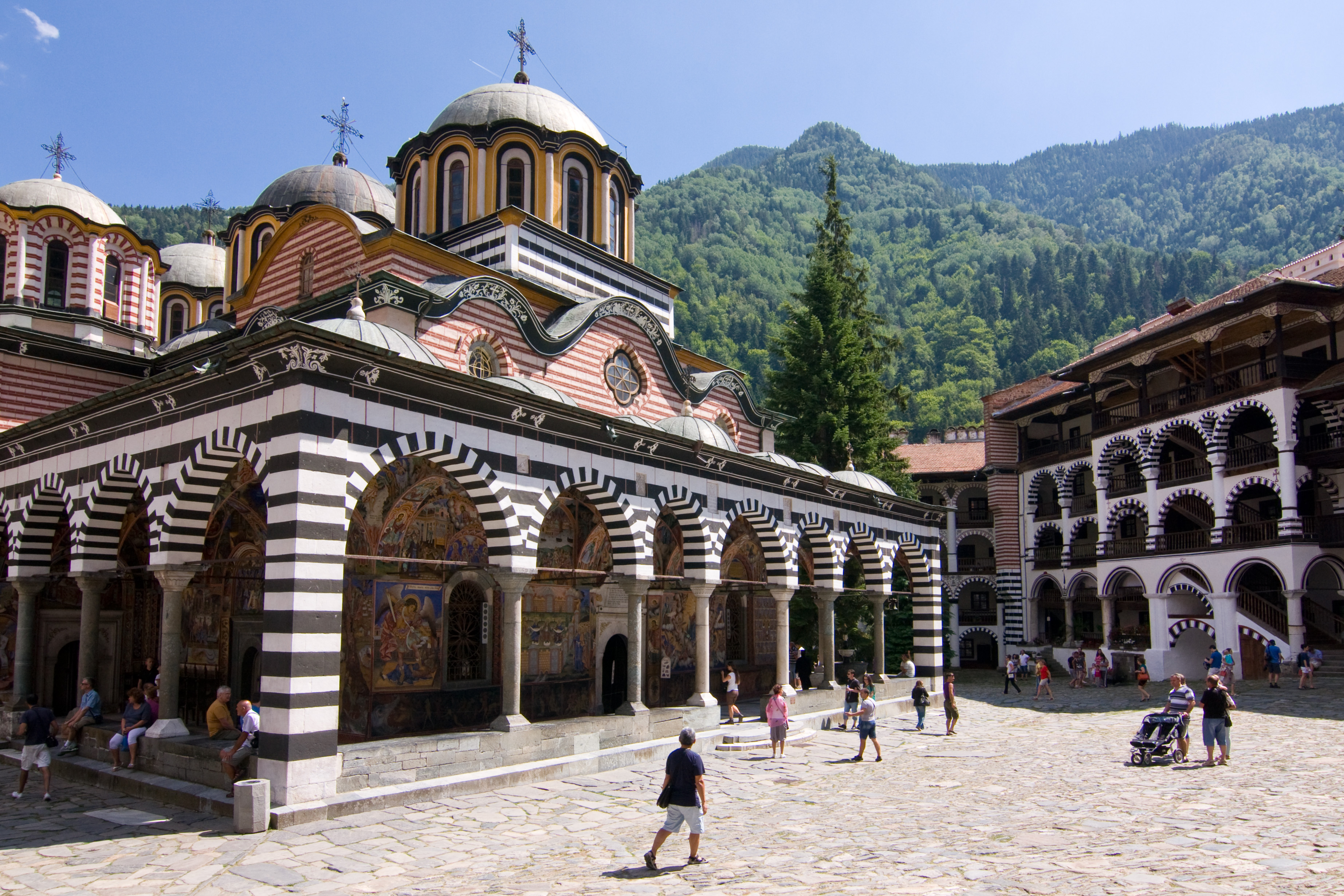
Rila Monastery

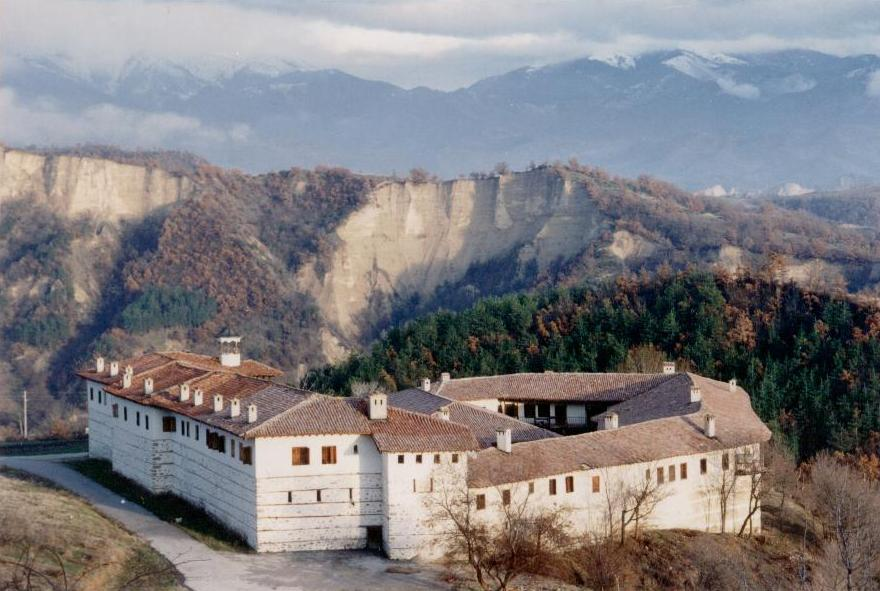
Rozhen Monastery

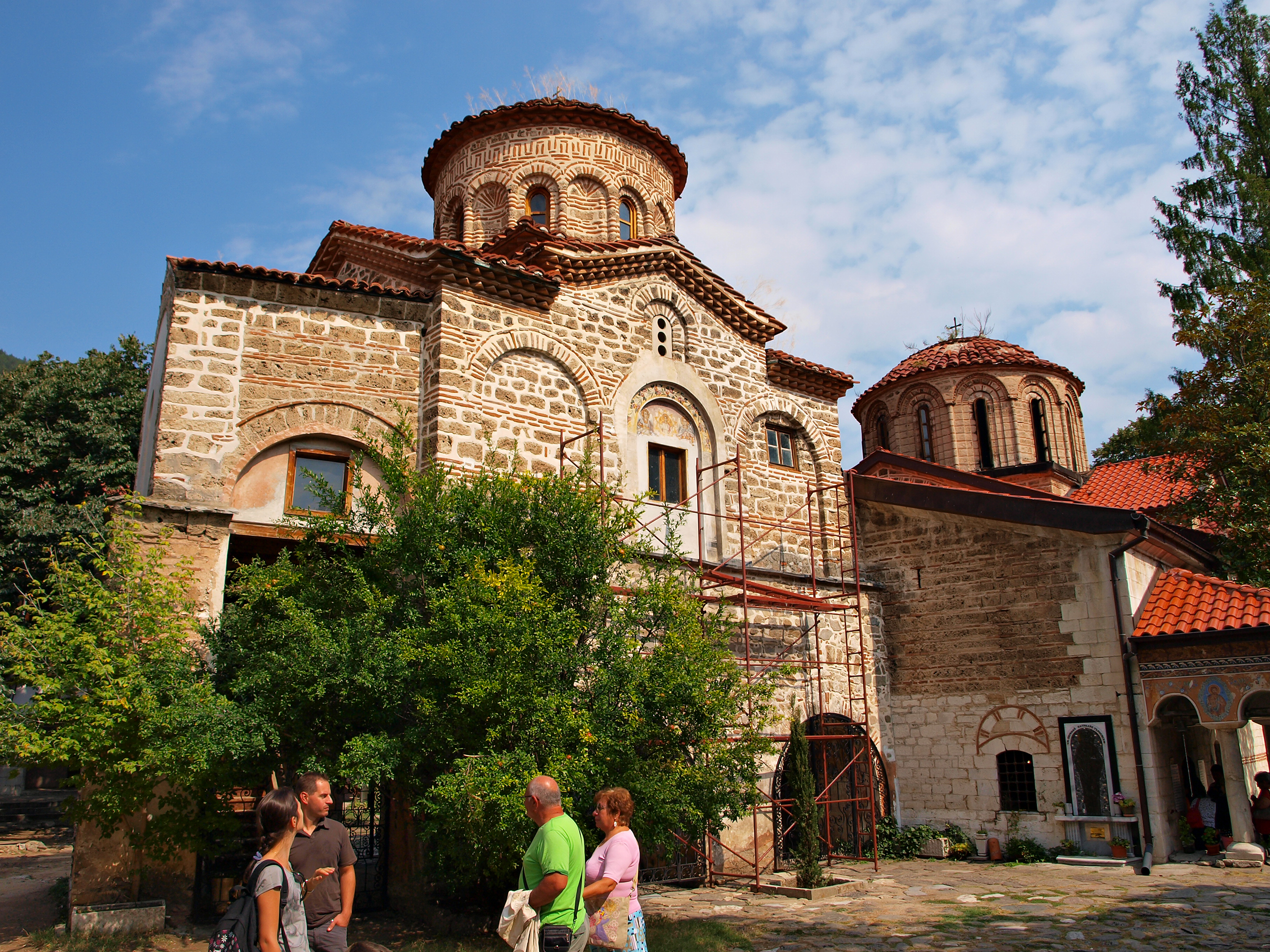
Bachkovo Monastery

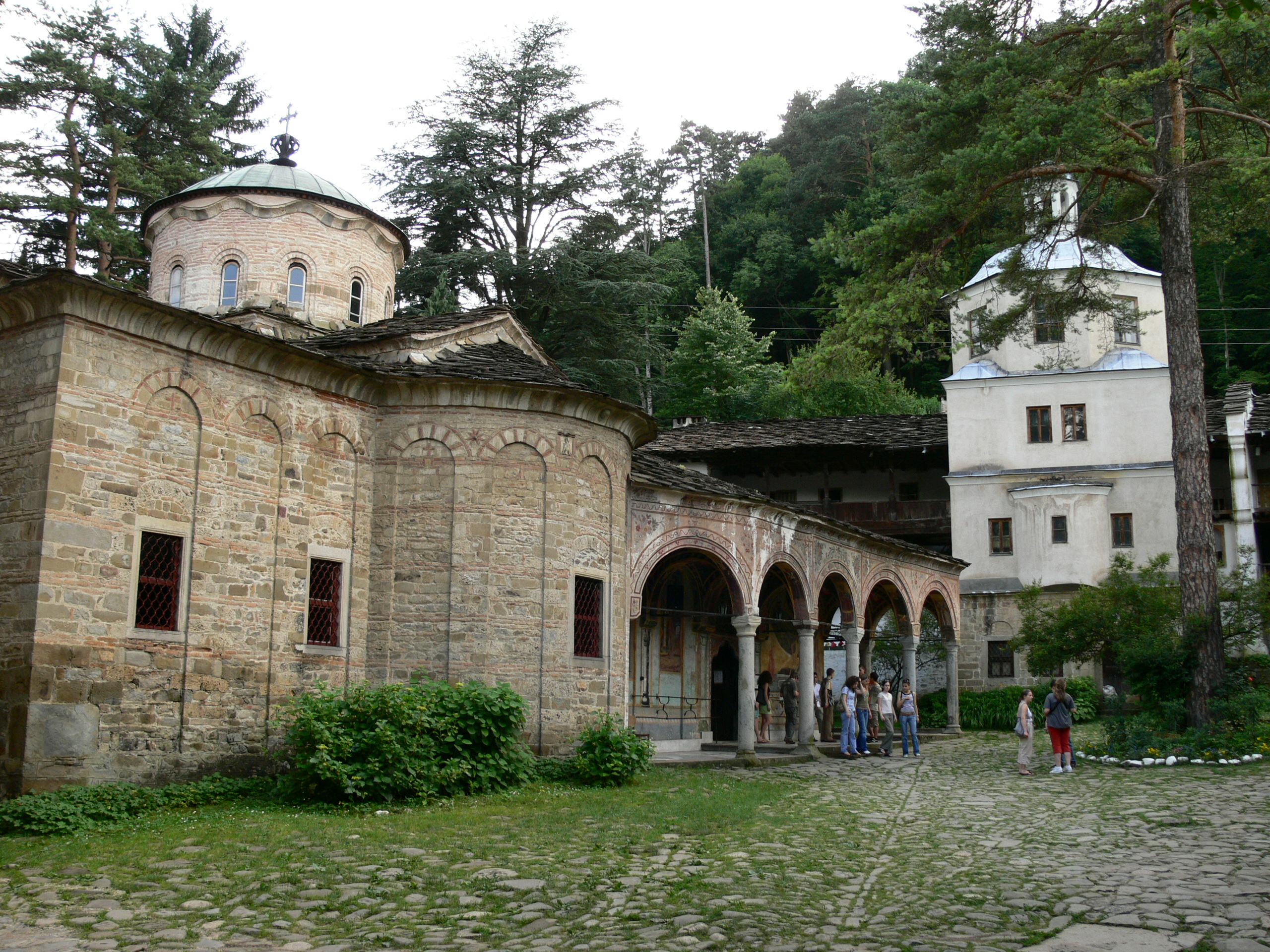
Troyan Monastery

==== Churches ====
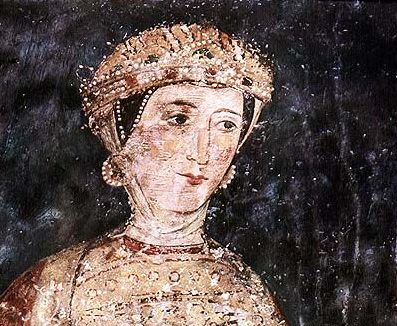
Boyana Church

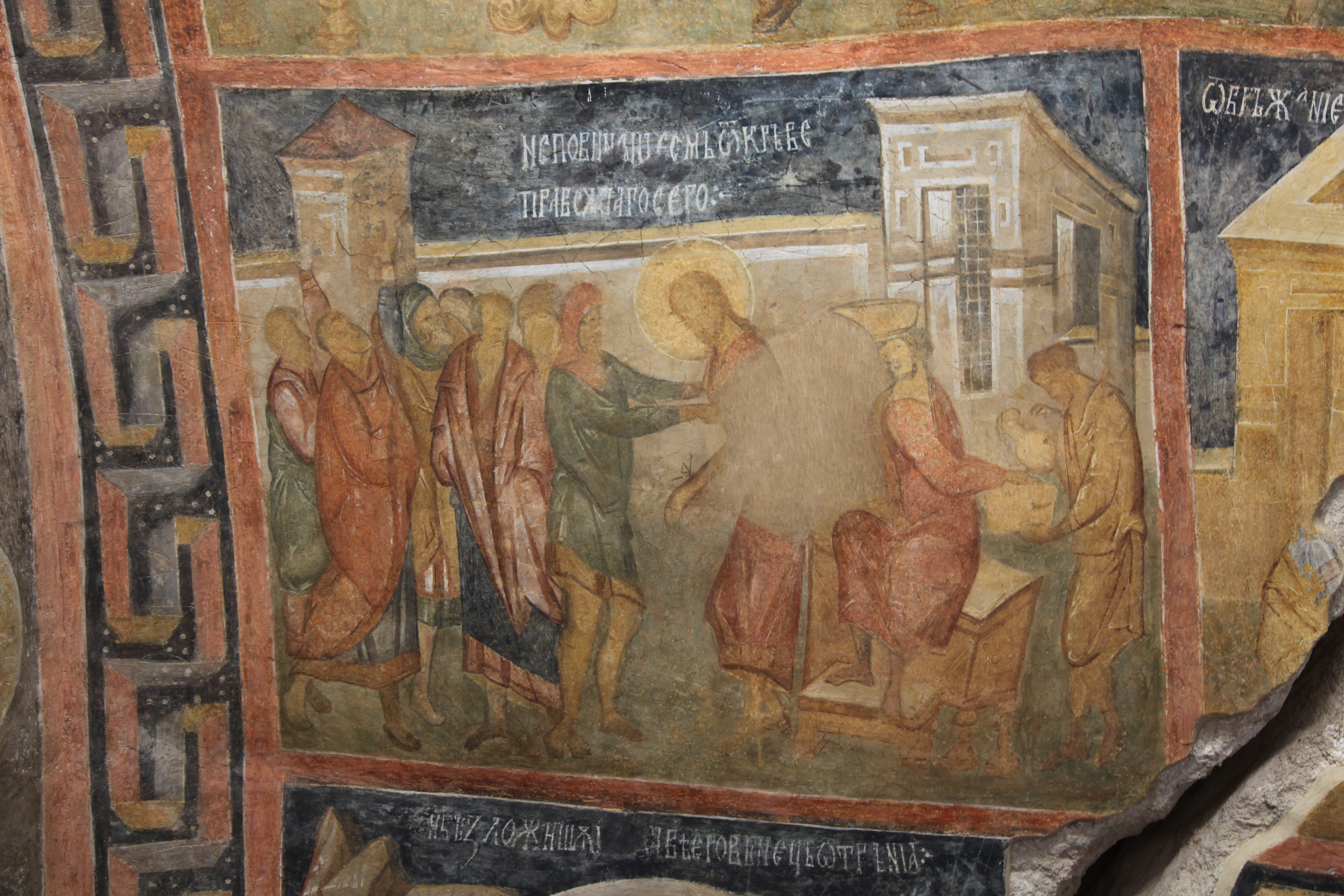
Rock-hewn Churches

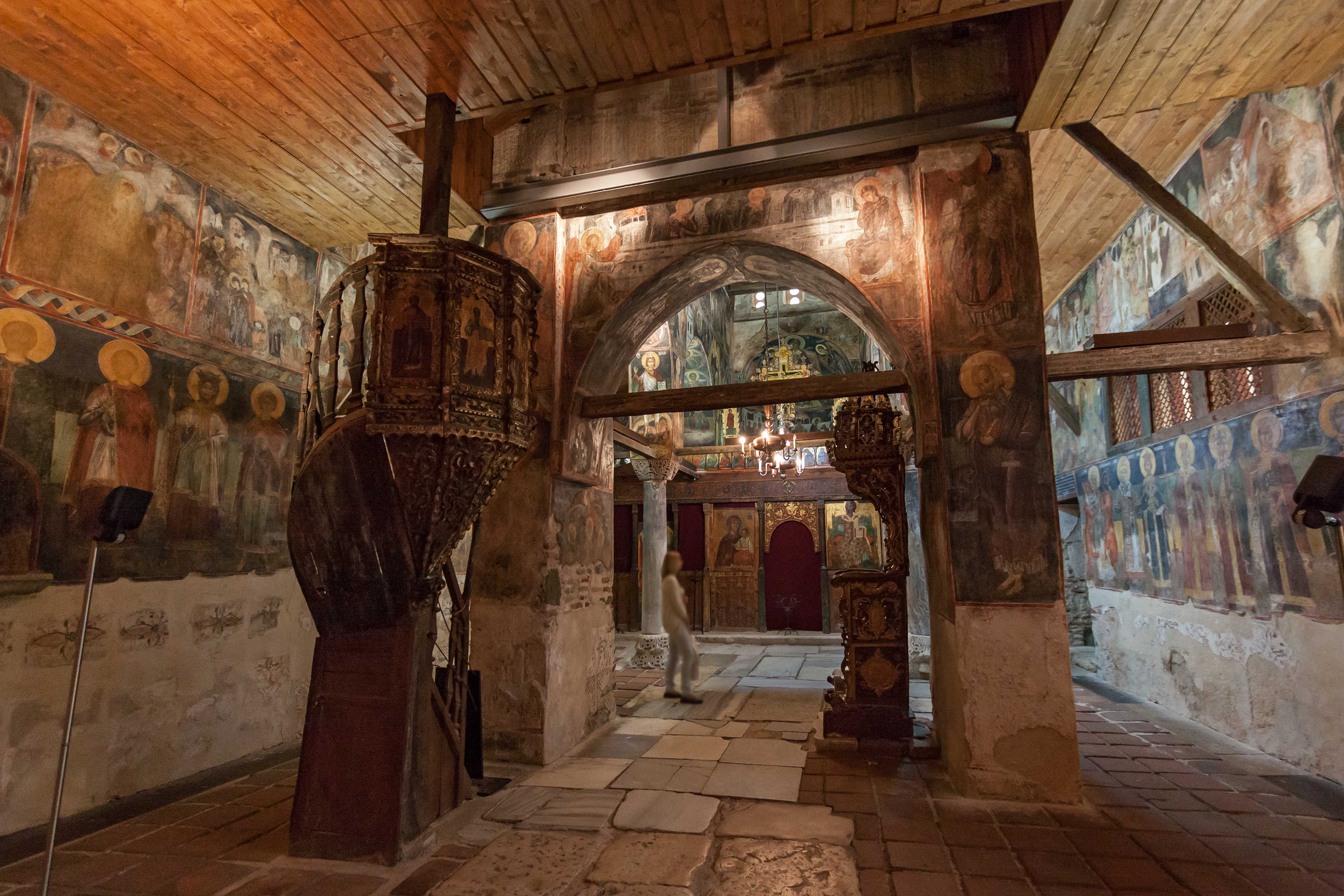
Churches of Nessebar

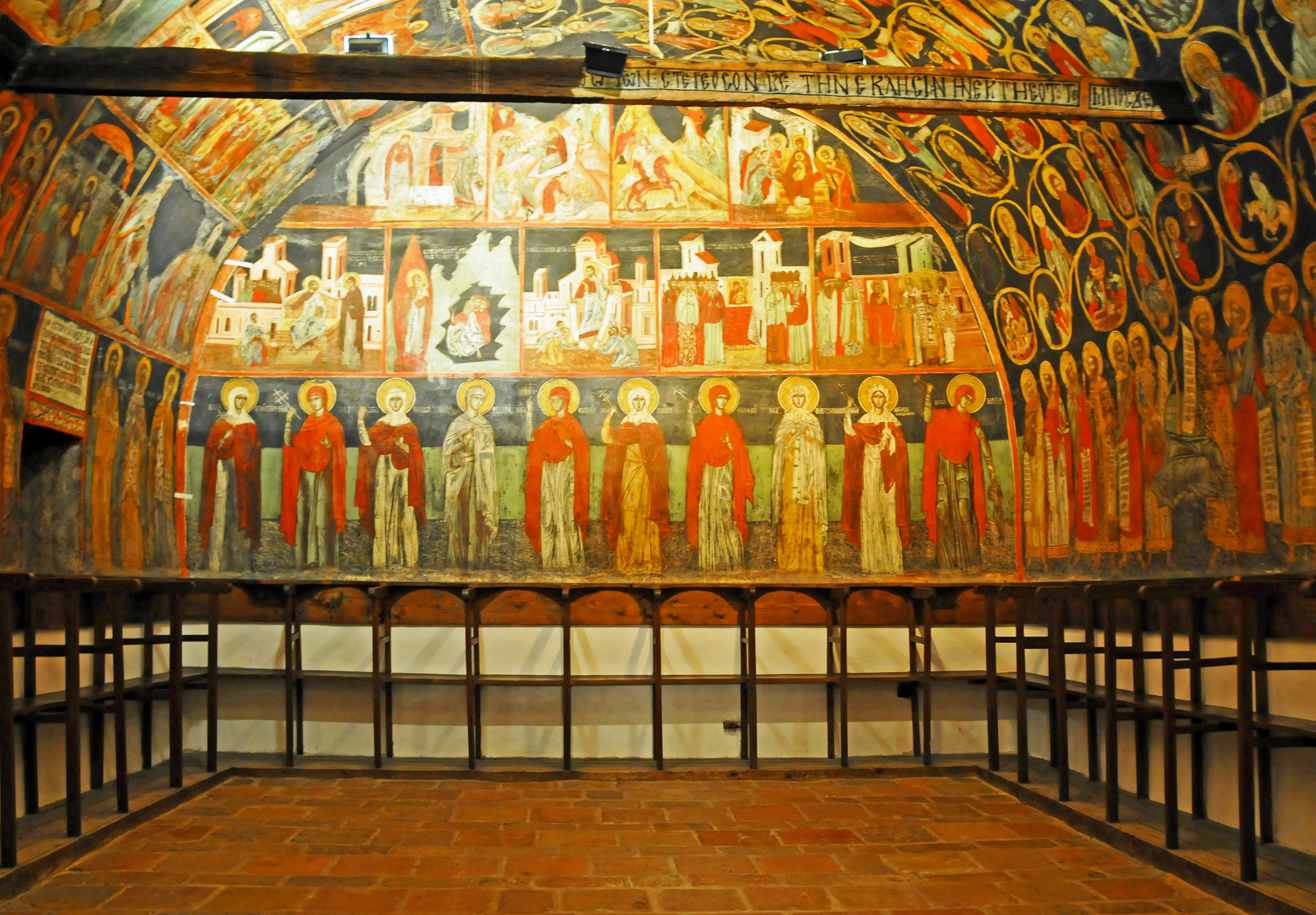
Church of the Nativity of Christ in Arbanasi

==== Festivals and events ====
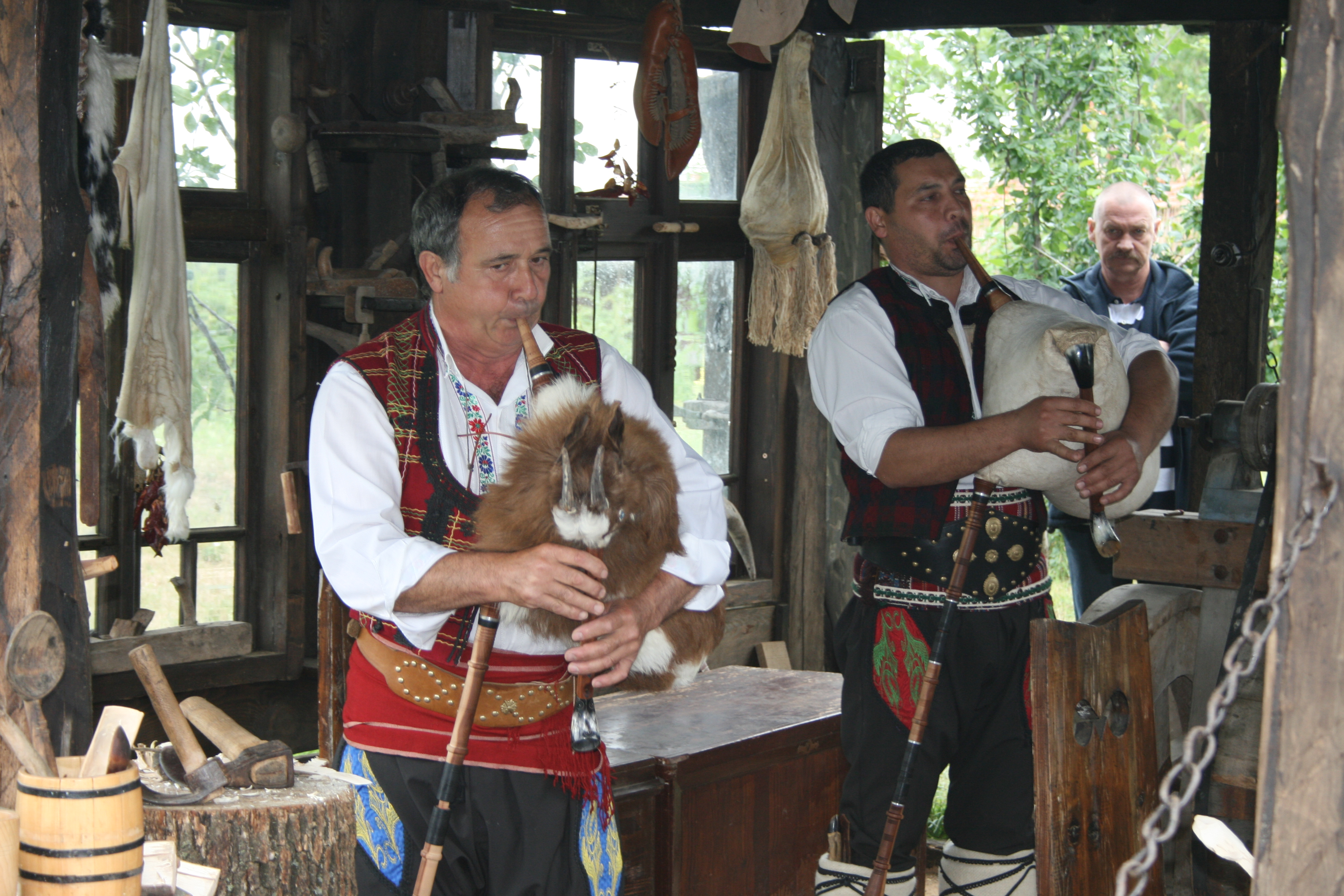
Rozhen National Folklore Fair

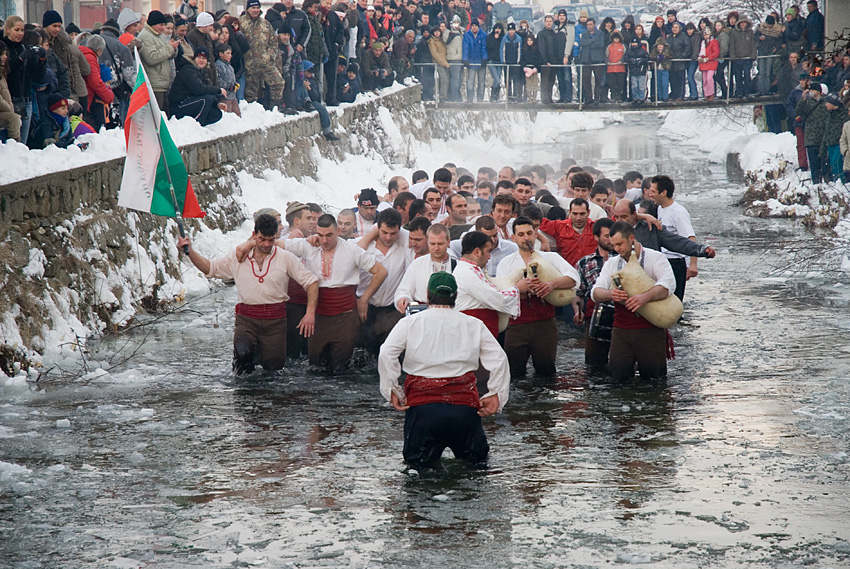
Epiphany's horo in Kalofer

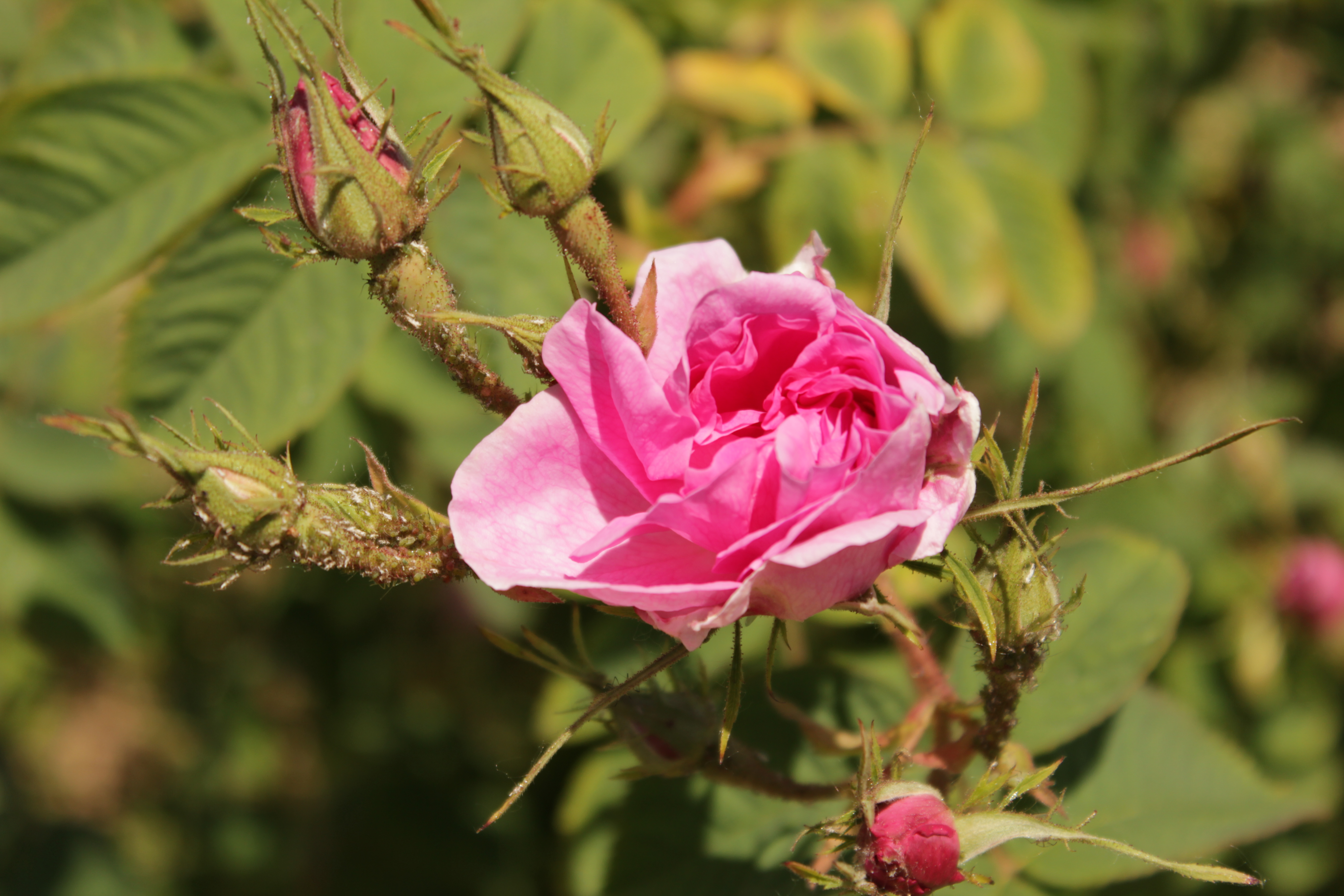
Festival of the rose, Kazanlak

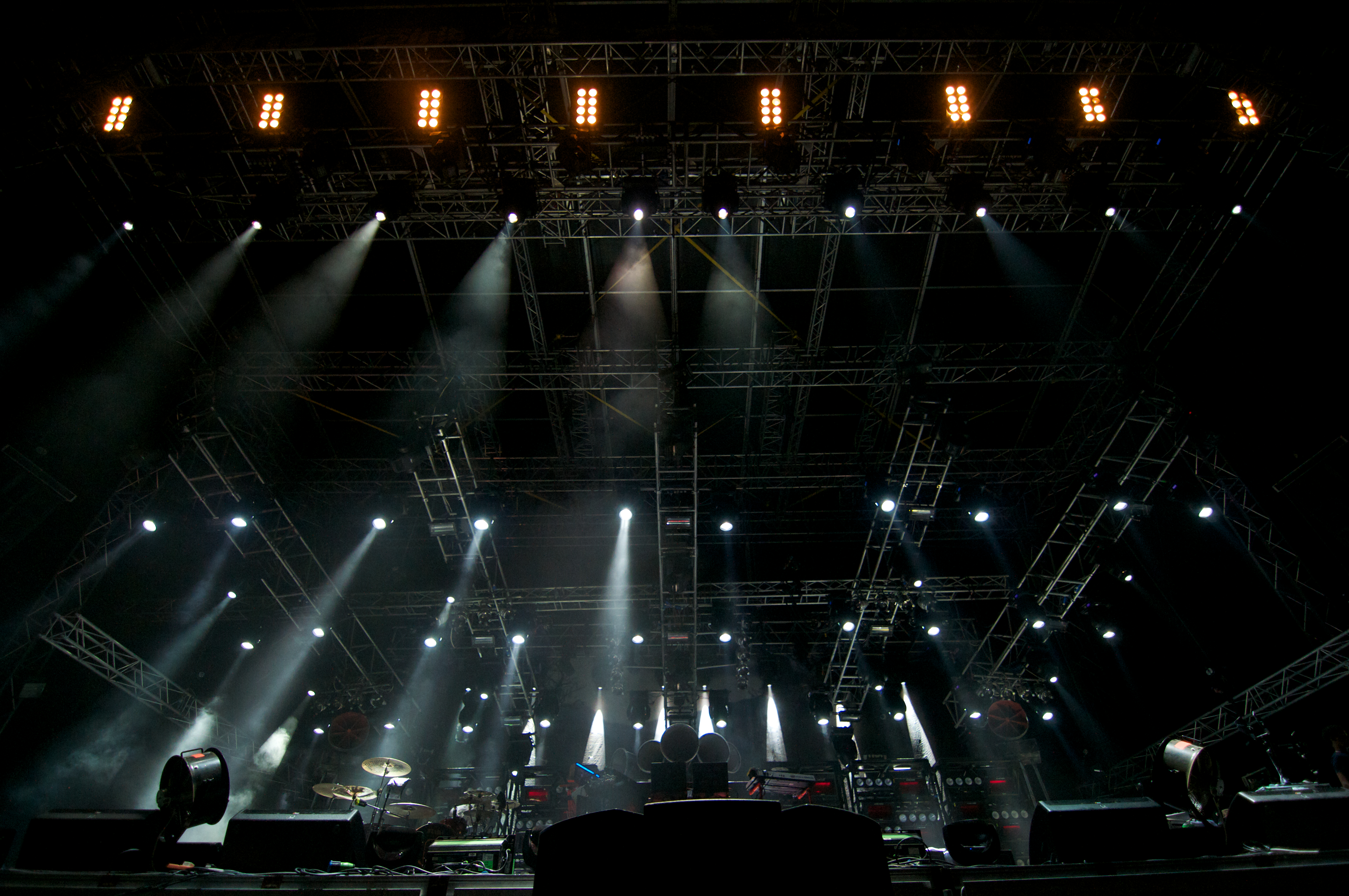
Spirit of Burgas

=== Resorts and nature tourism ===
==== Seaside resorts ====
The Bulgarian Black Sea Coast is picturesque and diverse. White and golden sandy beaches occupy approximately 130 km of the 378 km long coast. The temperatures during the summer months are very suitable for marine tourism and the water temperature allows sea bathing from May to October. Prior to 1989 the Bulgarian Black Sea coast was internationally known as the Red Riviera. Since the fall of the Iron Curtain, however, its nickname has been changed to the Bulgarian Riviera.

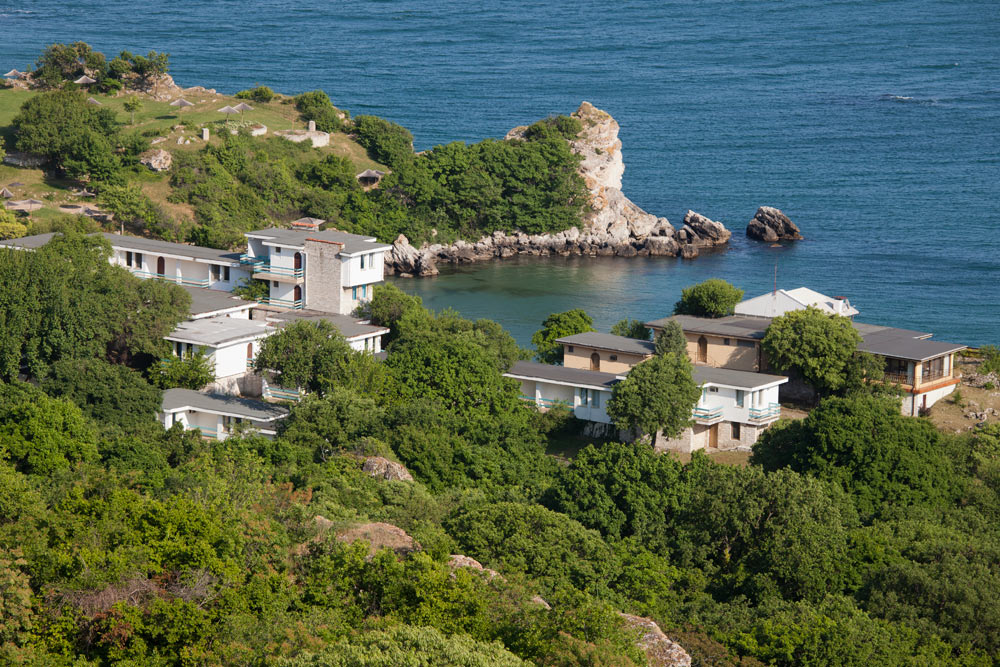
Rusalka

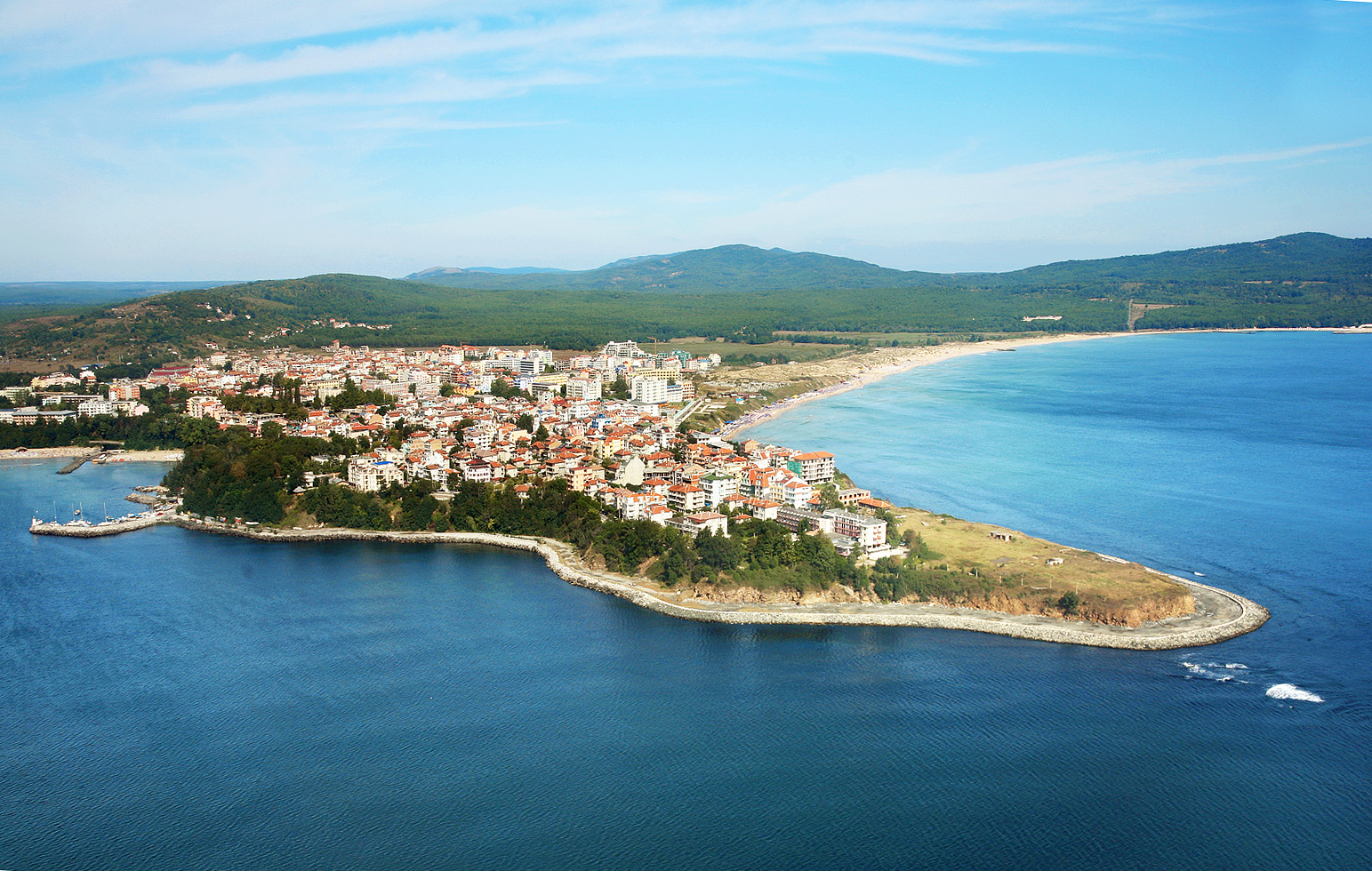
Primorsko

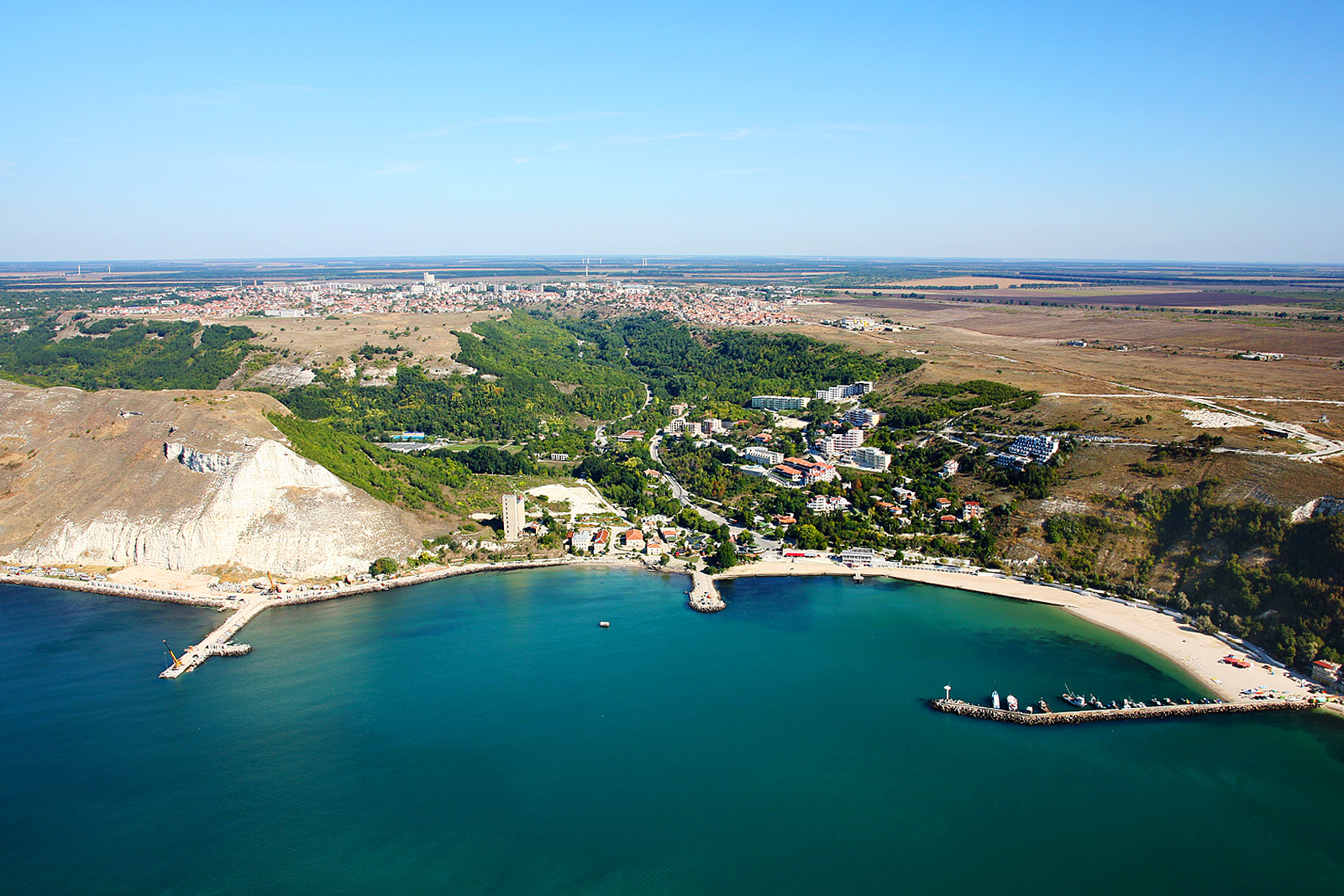
Kavarna

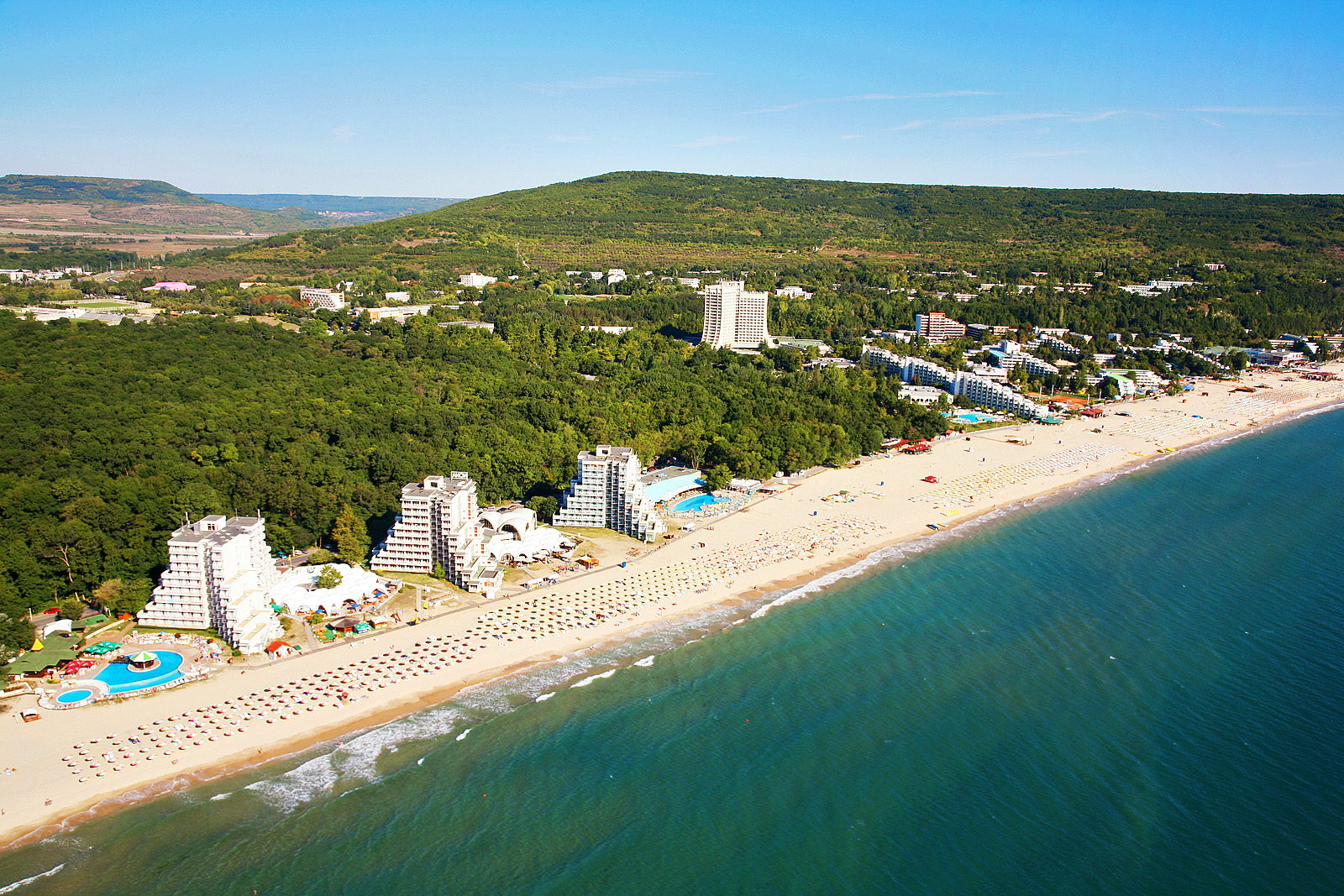
Albena

==== Hiking and skiing ====
The country has several ski areas which offer excellent conditions for skiing, snowboarding, ski running and other winter sports.

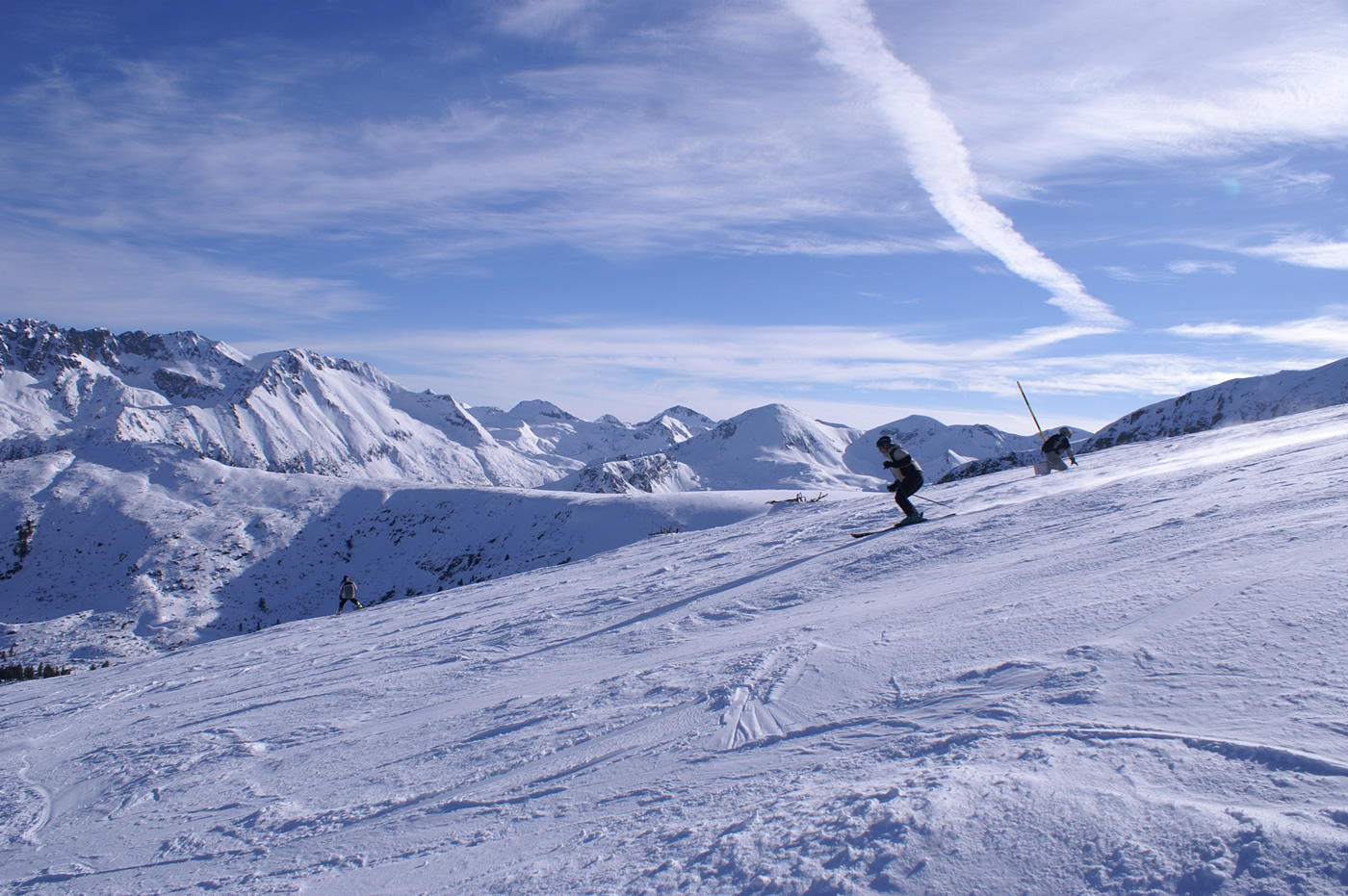
Bansko

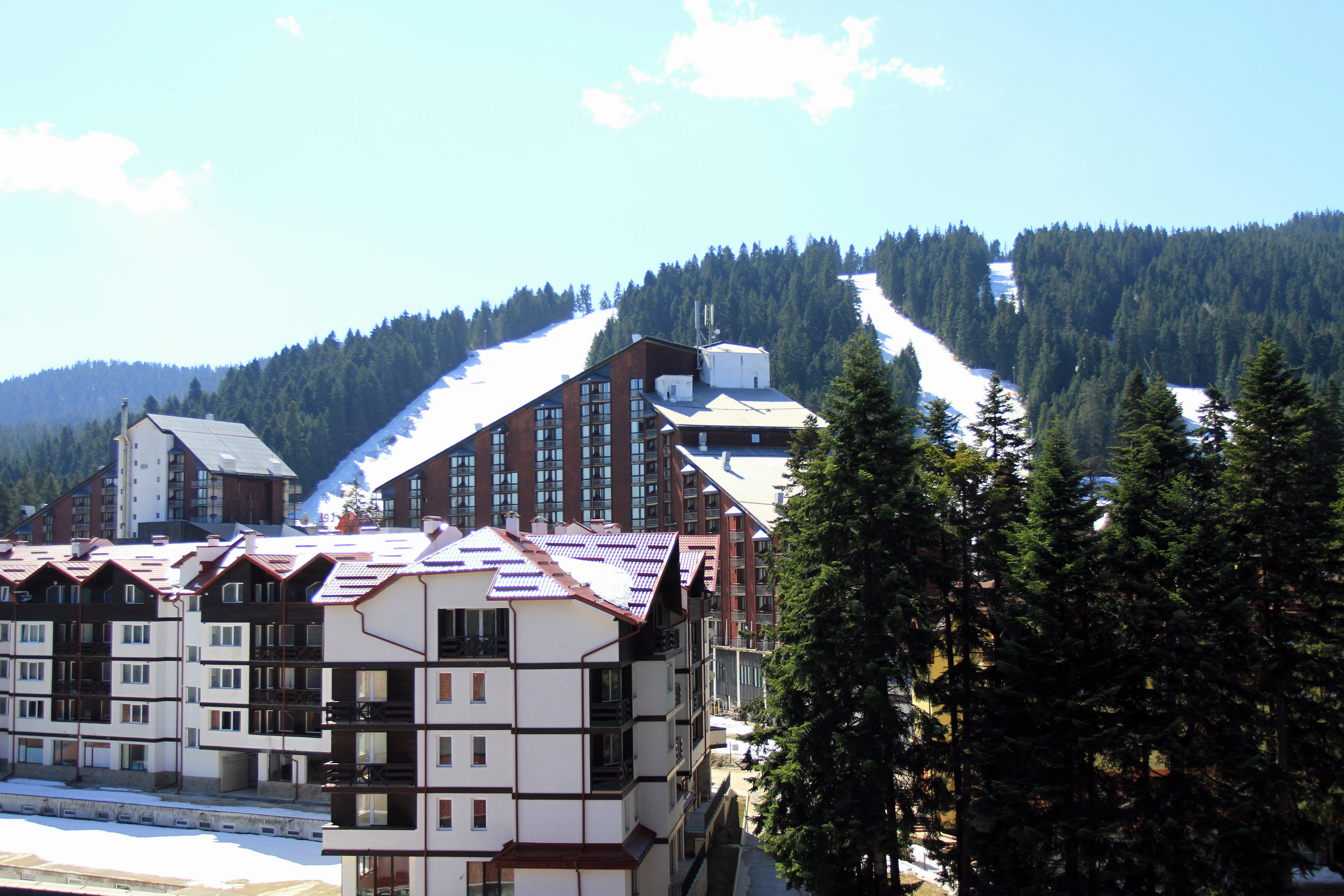
Borovets

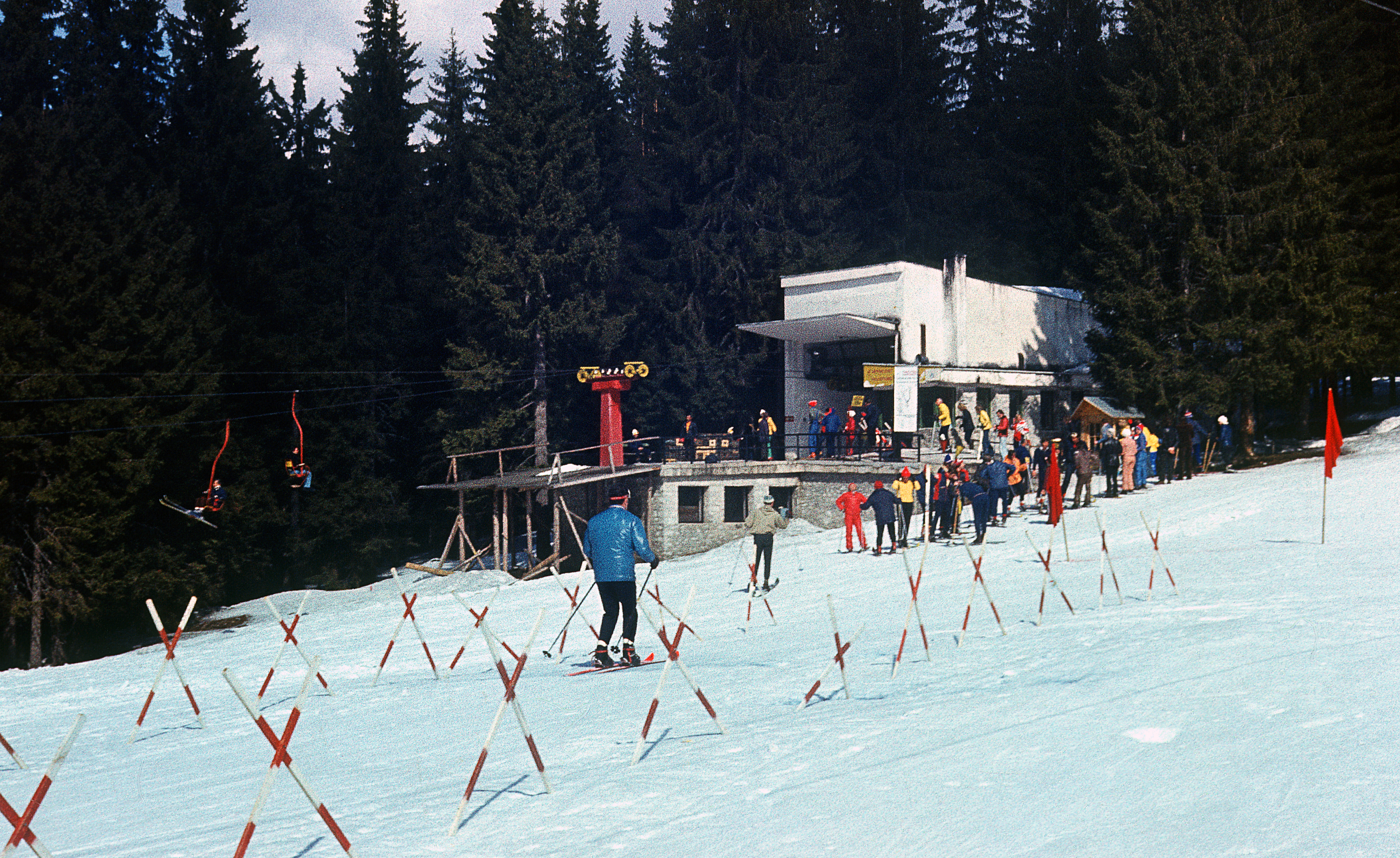
Pamporovo

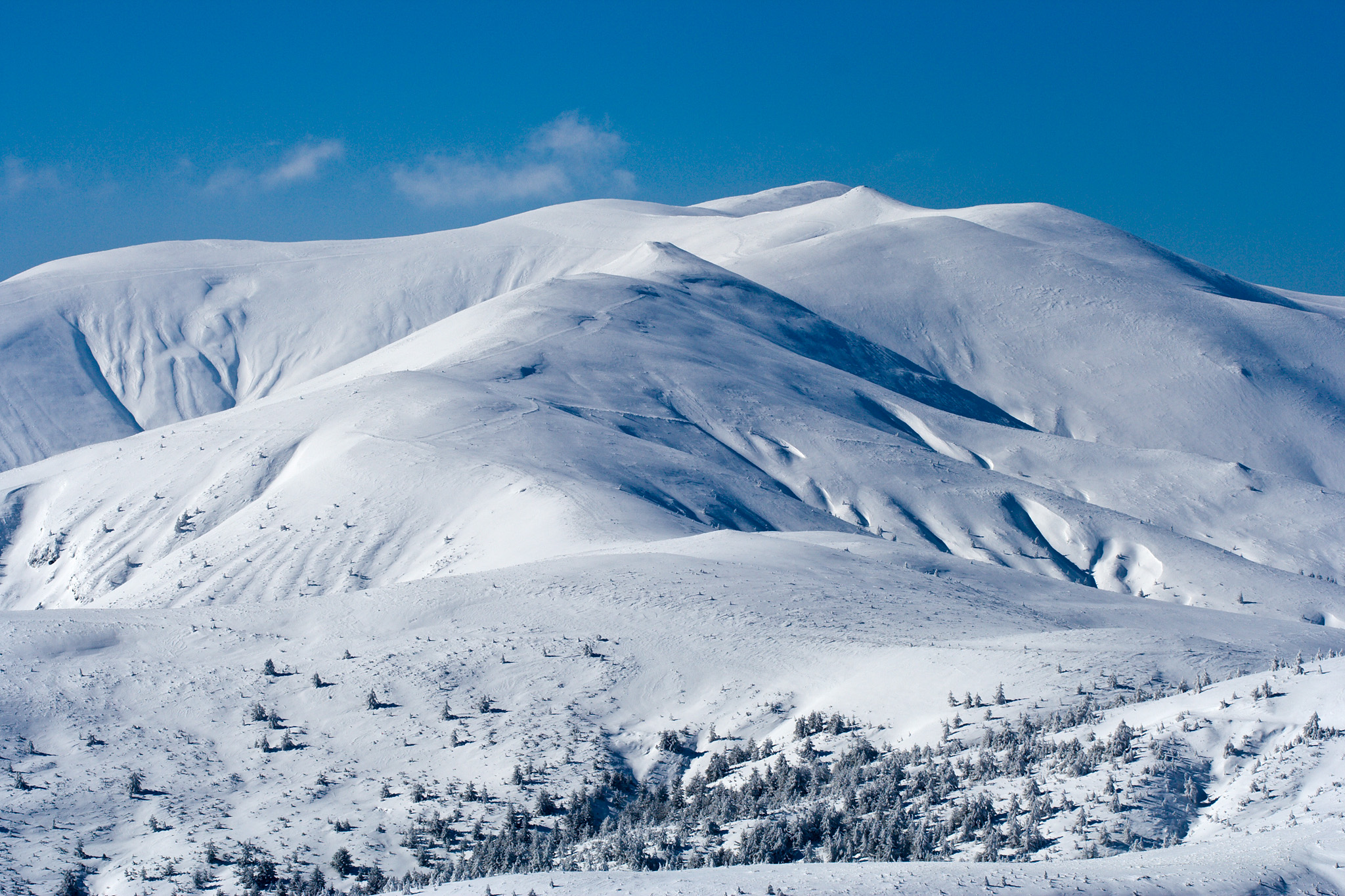
Osogovo

== National Parks ==
Bulgaria has 3 national parks, 11 nature parks and 55 nature reserves. The first nature park in Bulgaria and the Balkan Peninsula is Vitosha Nature Park, established in 1934.

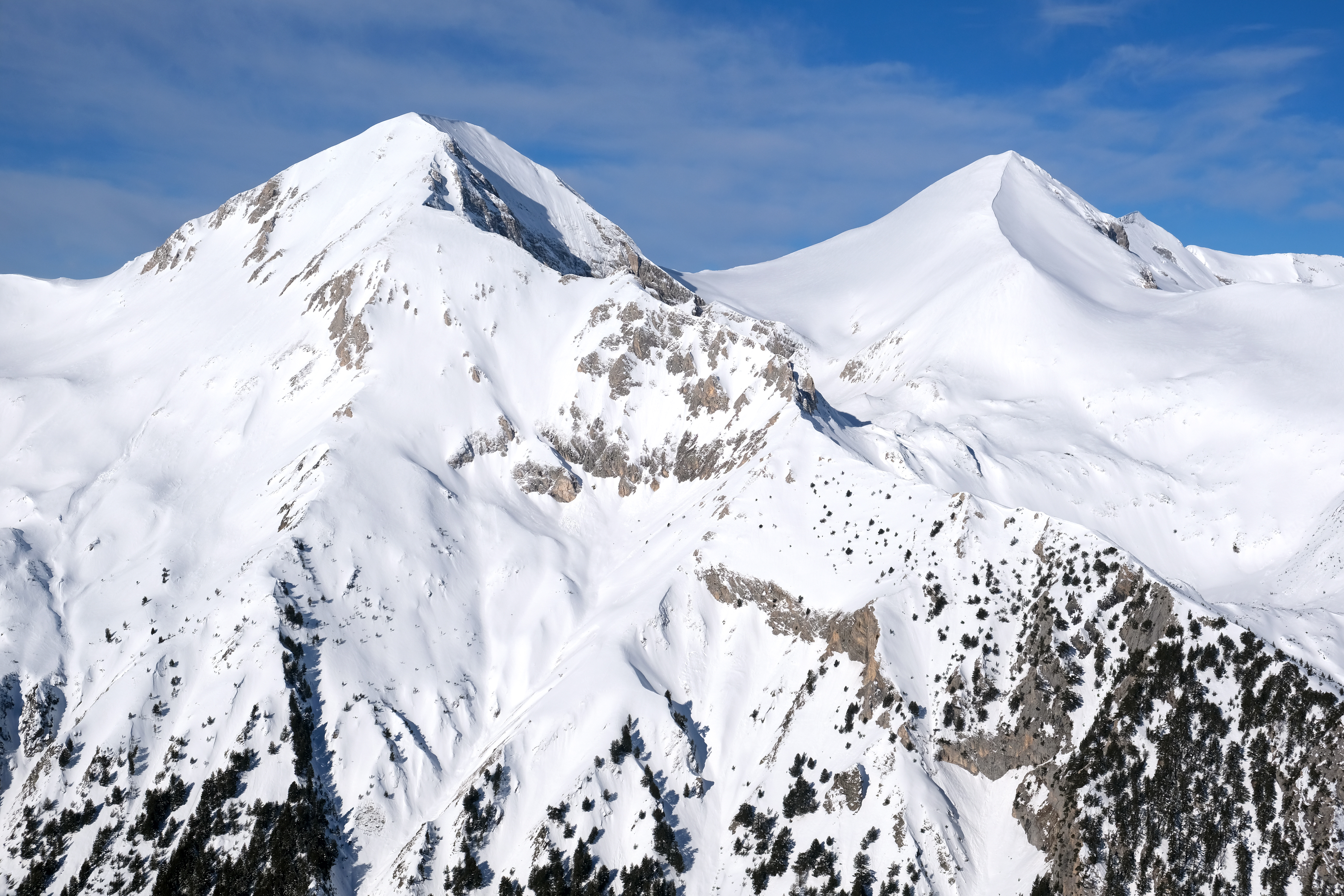
Pirin National Park

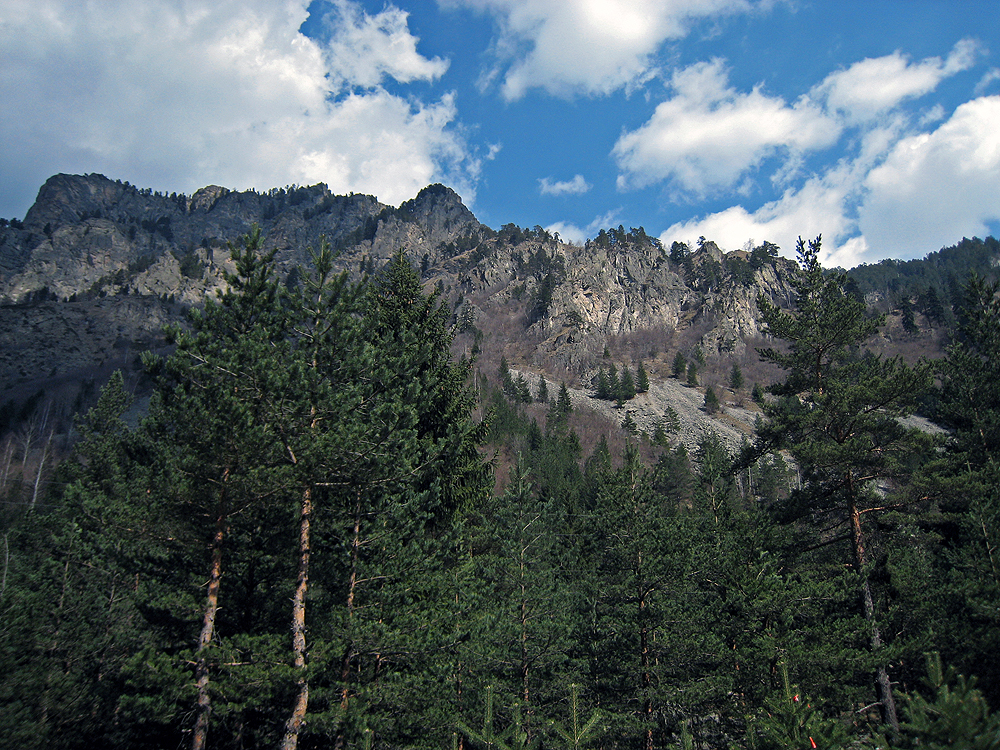
Rila National Park

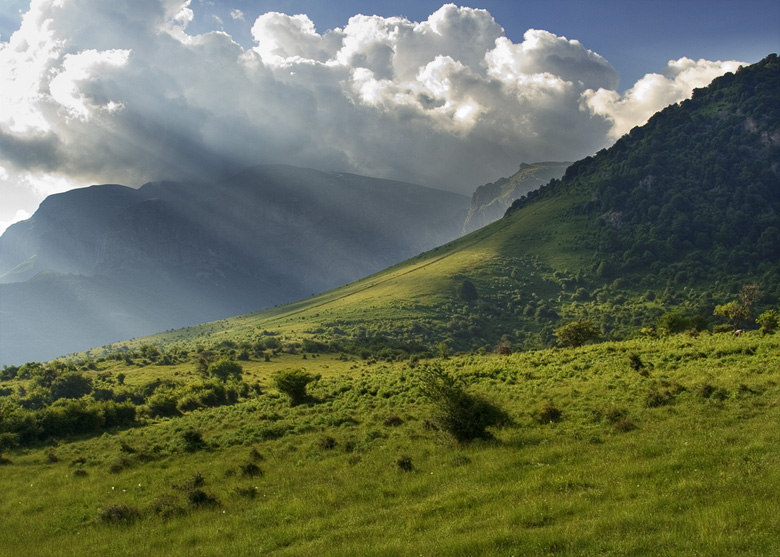
Central Balkan National Park

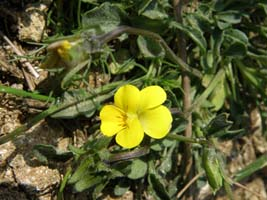
Belasitsa Nature Park

=== Caves and waterfalls ===
As of 2002, there are around 4,500 discovered underground formations in Bulgaria. The earliest written records about the caves in Bulgaria are found in the manuscripts of the 17th century Bulgarian Catholic figure and historian Petar Bogdan. The first Bulgarian speleological society was established in 1929. The caves in the country are inhabited by more than 700 invertebrate species and 32 of the 37 species of bats found in Europe.

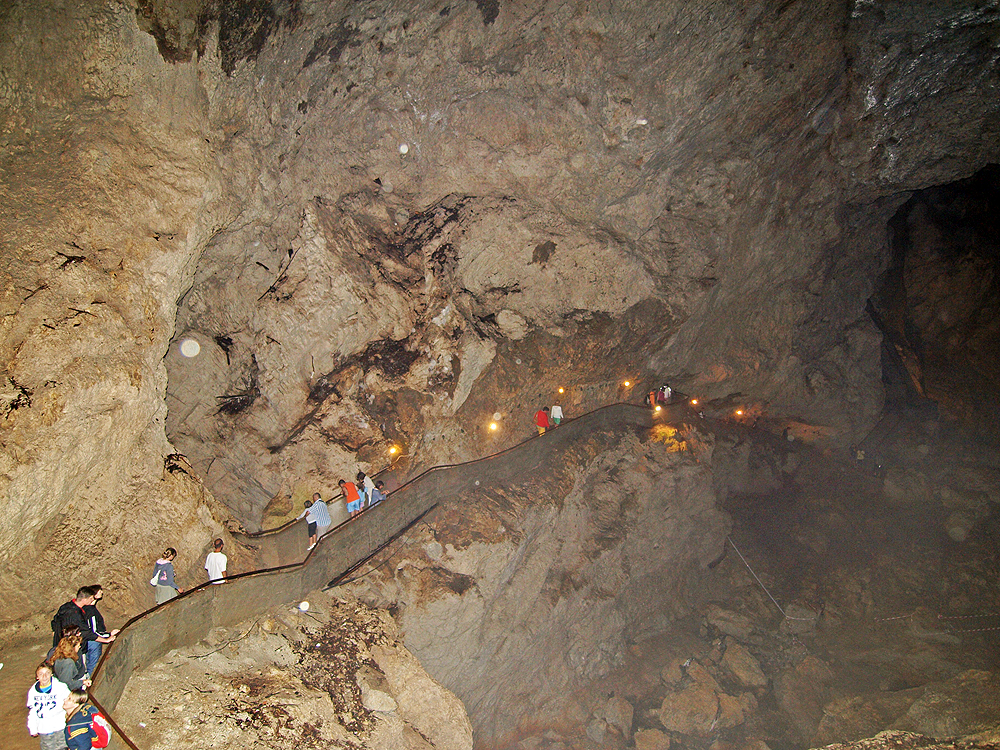
Devil's Throat Cave

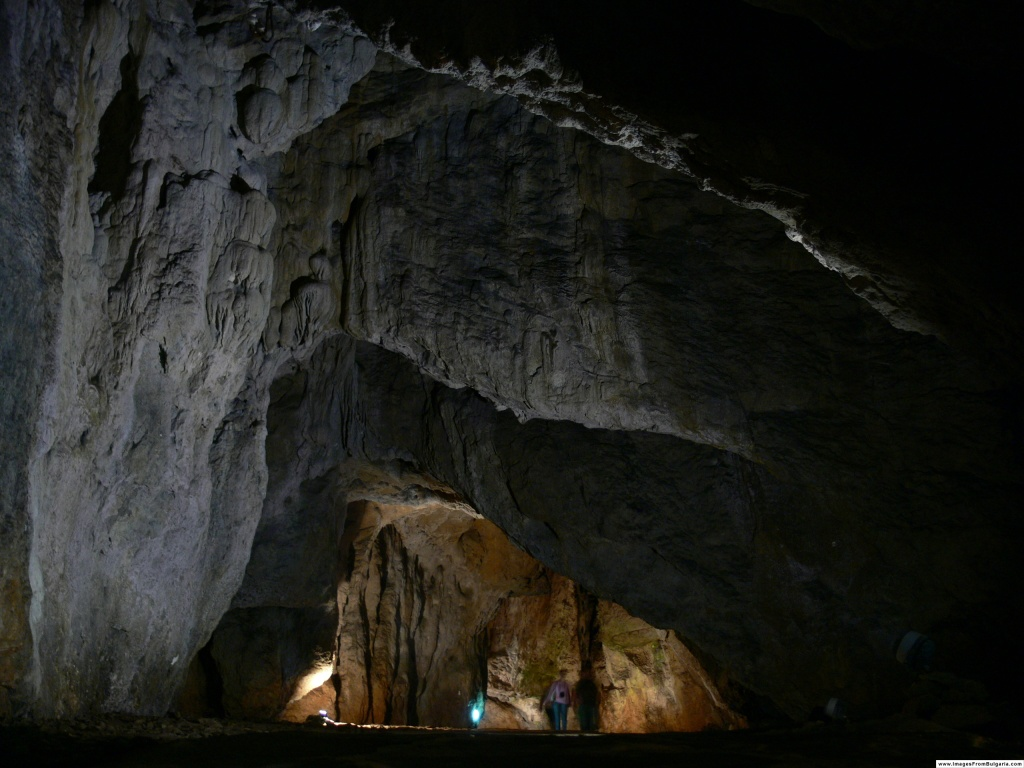
Bacho Kiro cave

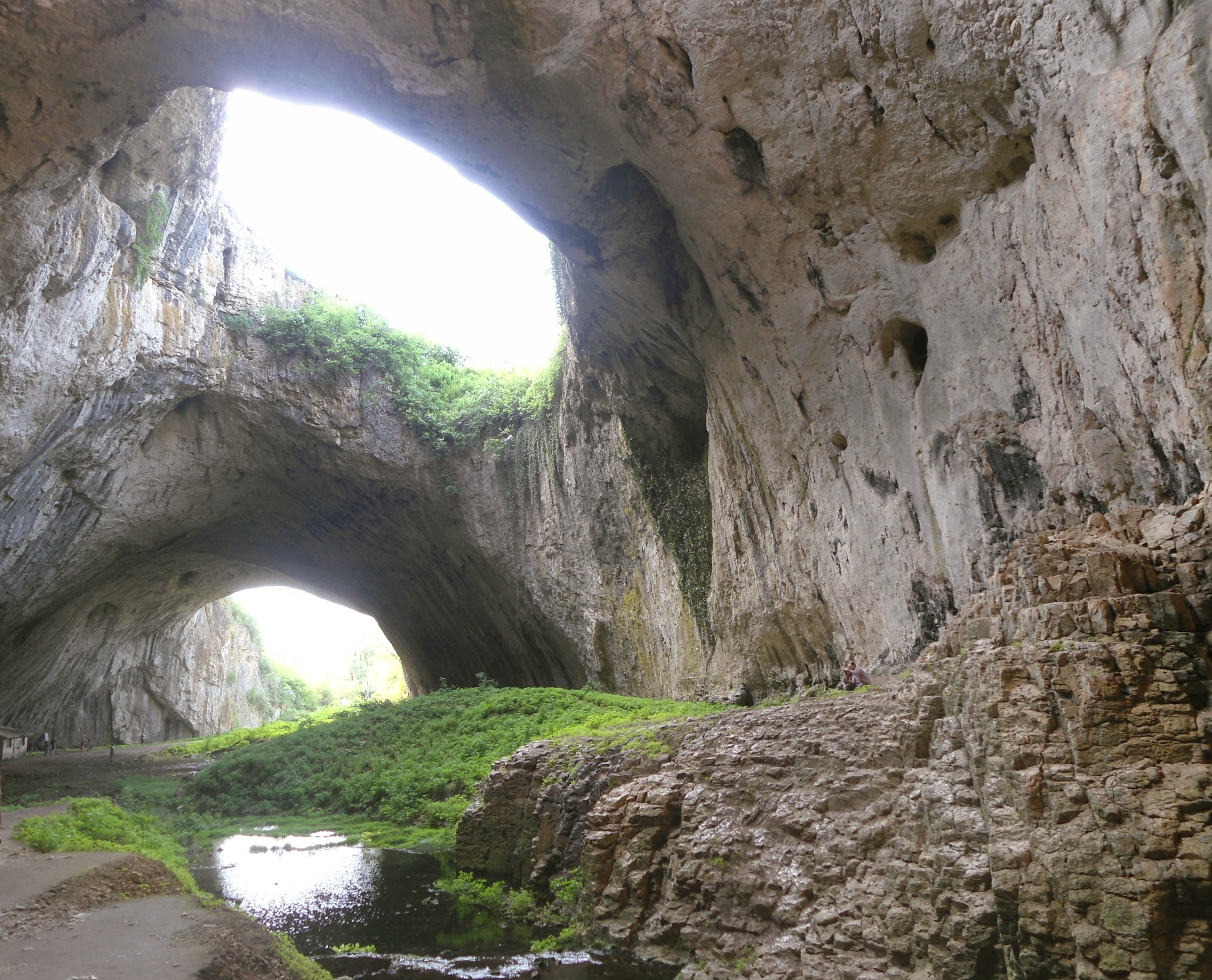
Devetashka cave

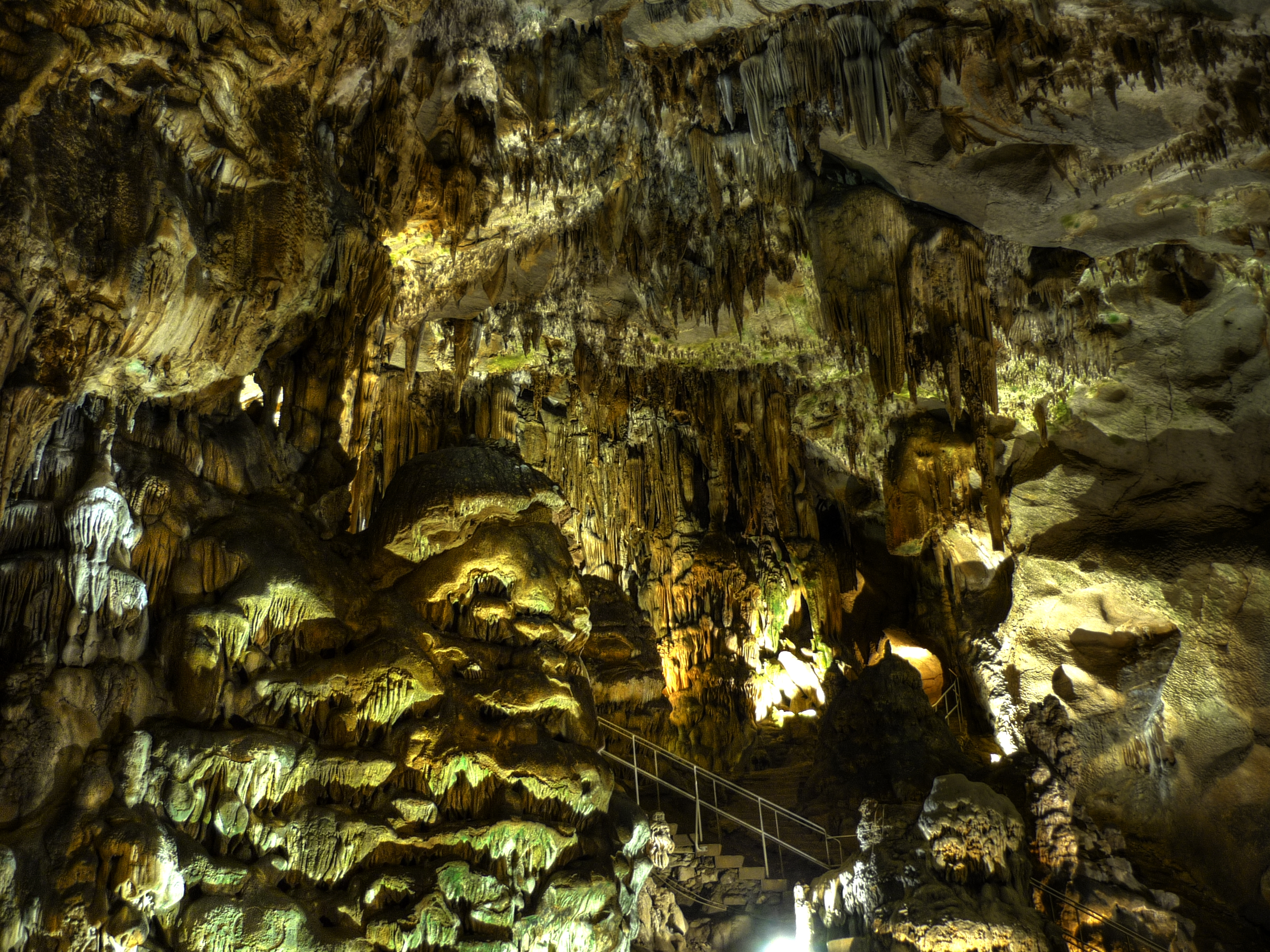
Ledenika

=== Nature landforms and formations ===
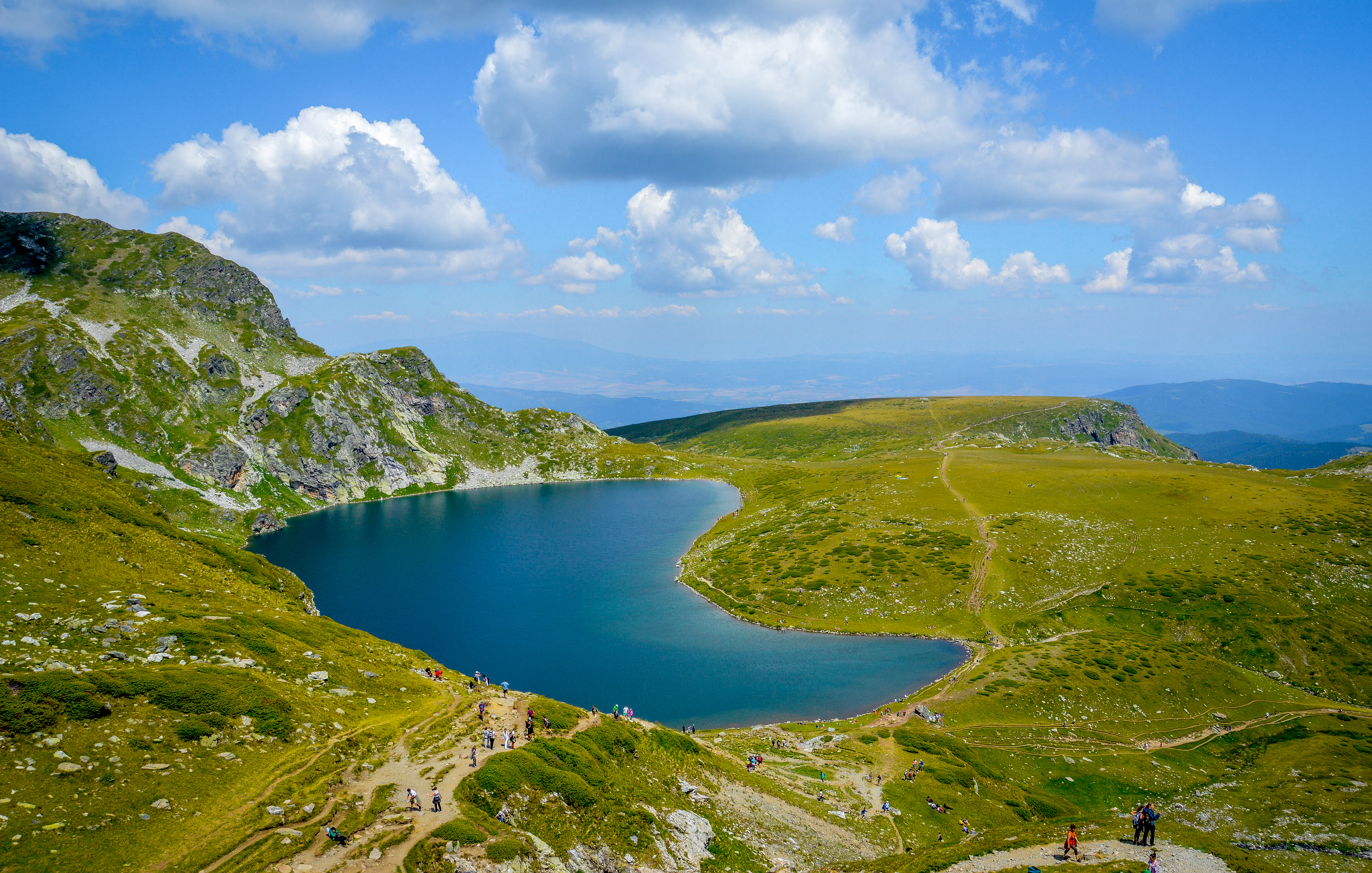
Seven Rila Lakes

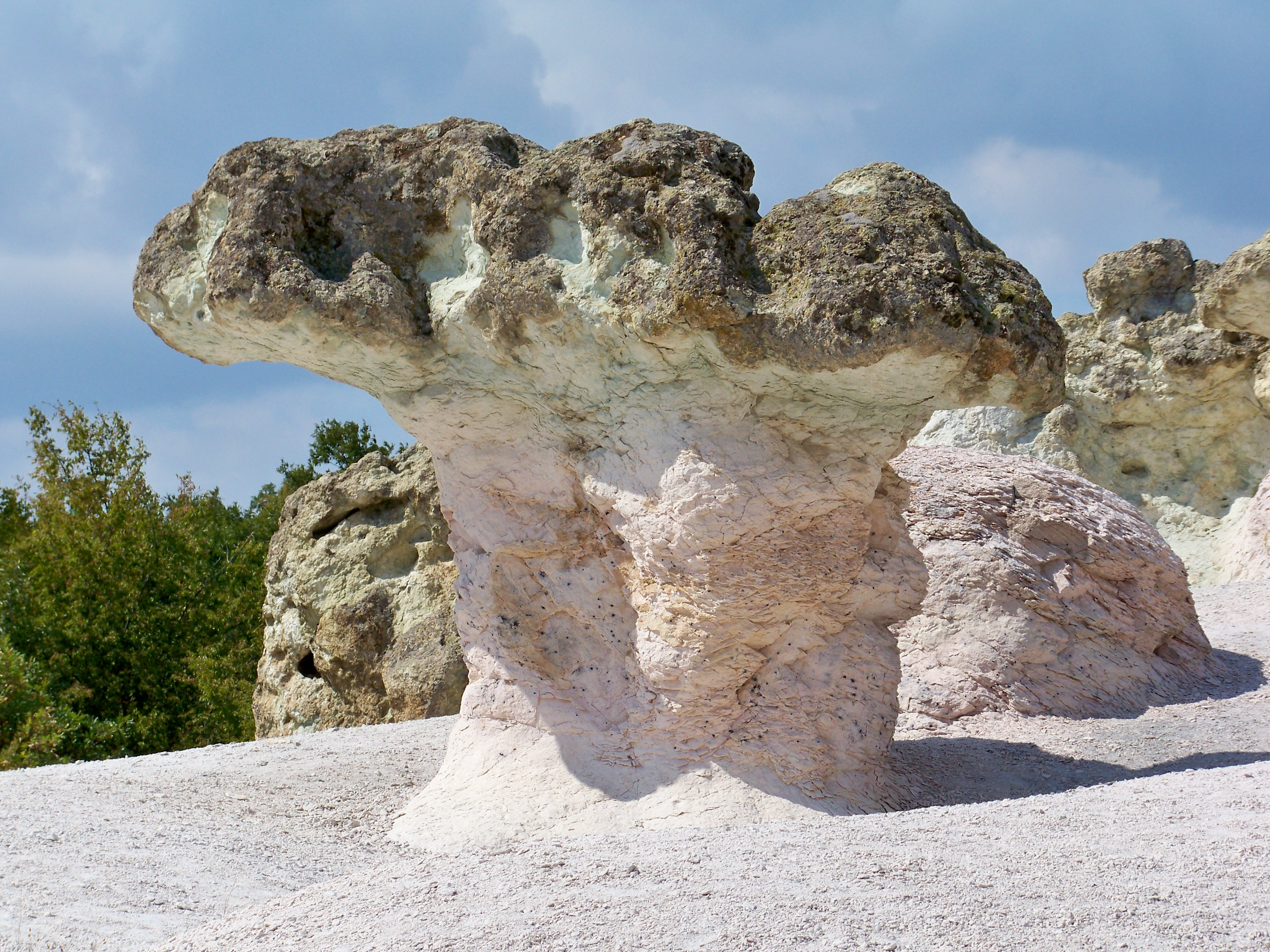
The Stone Mushrooms

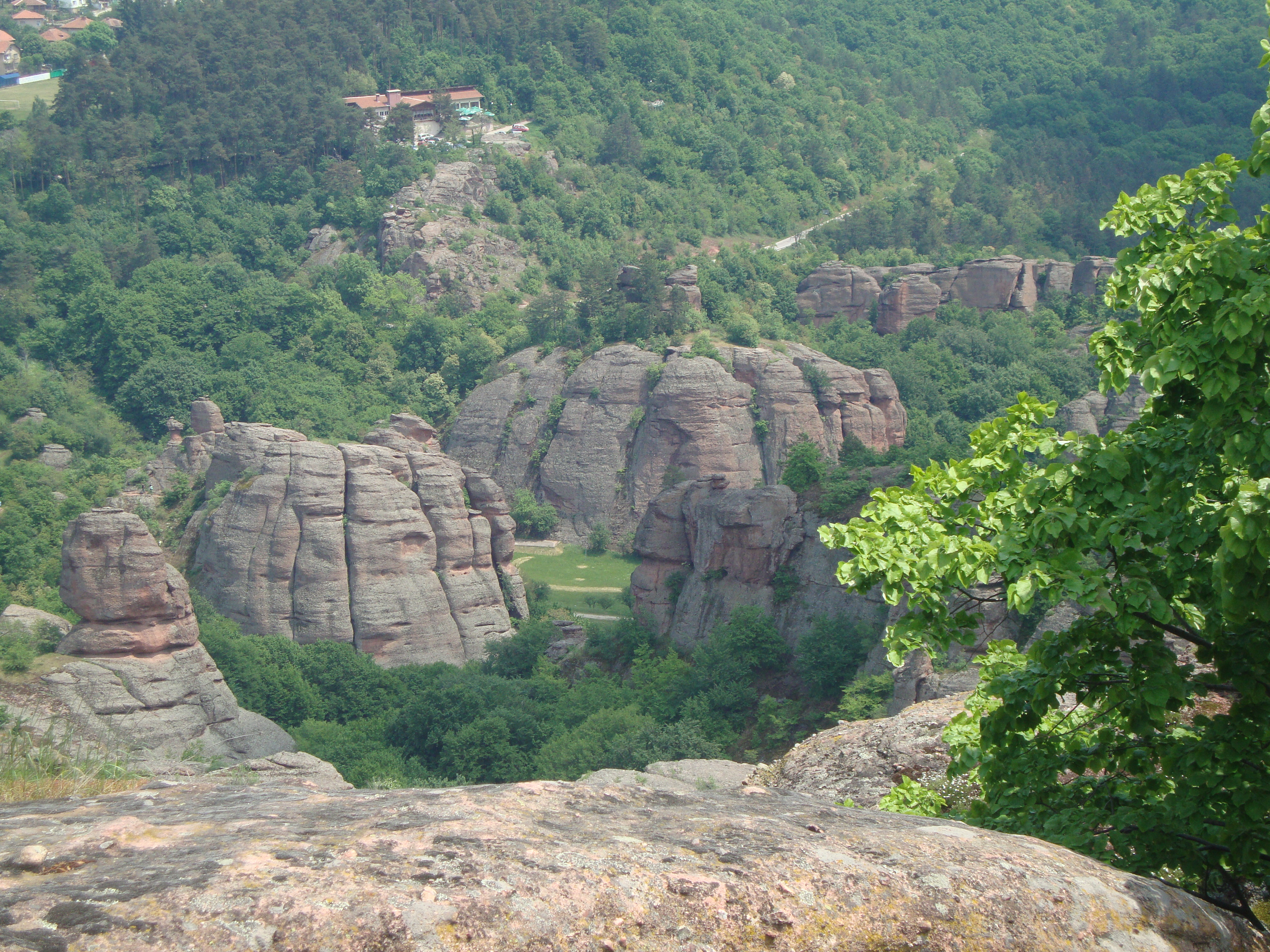
Belogradchik Rocks

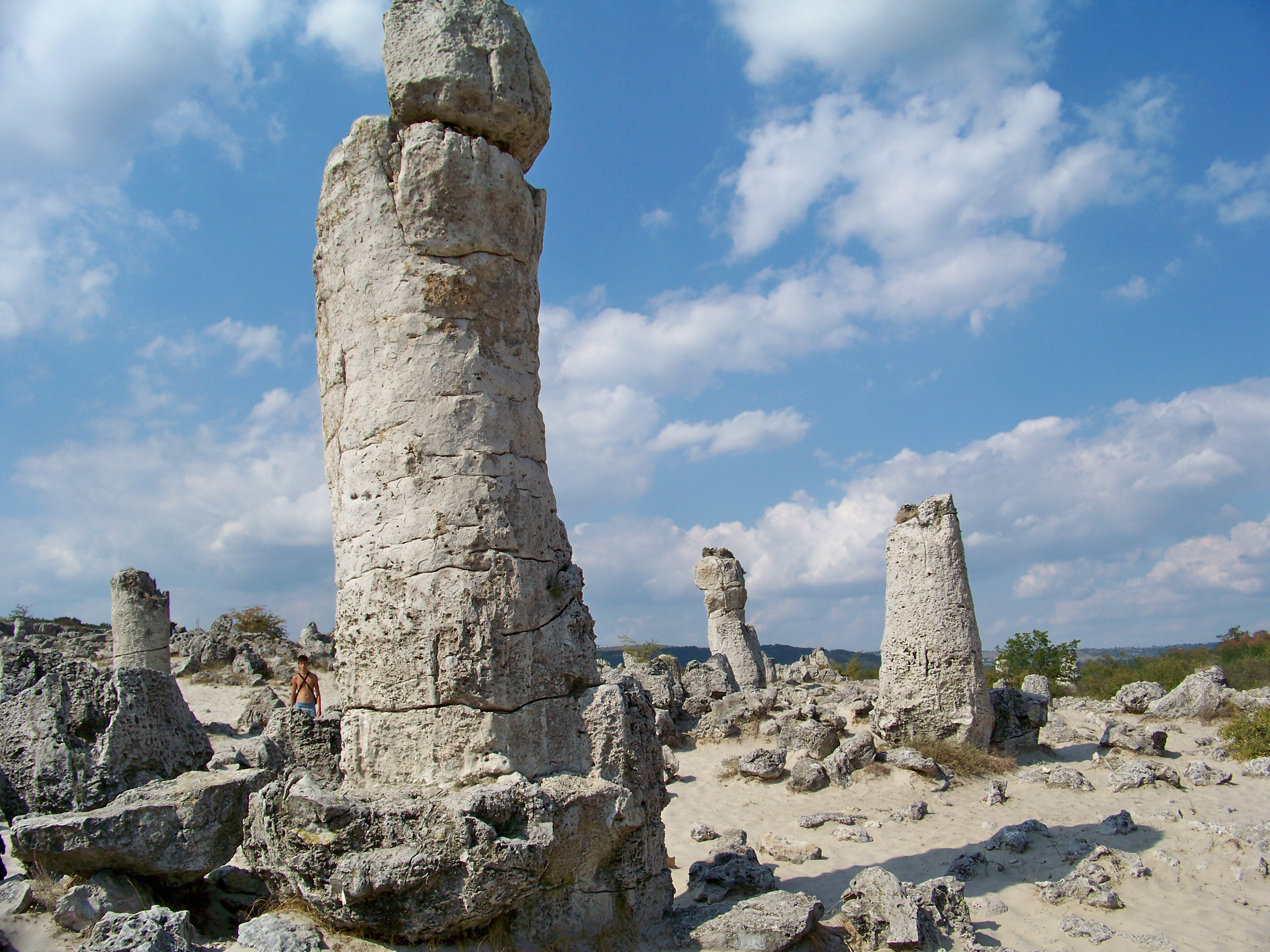
The Stone Desert

== See also ==
- List of World Heritage Sites in Bulgaria
