= Letnitsa Treasure =

4th-century BC Thracian silver-gilt treasure

- Летнишко съкровище
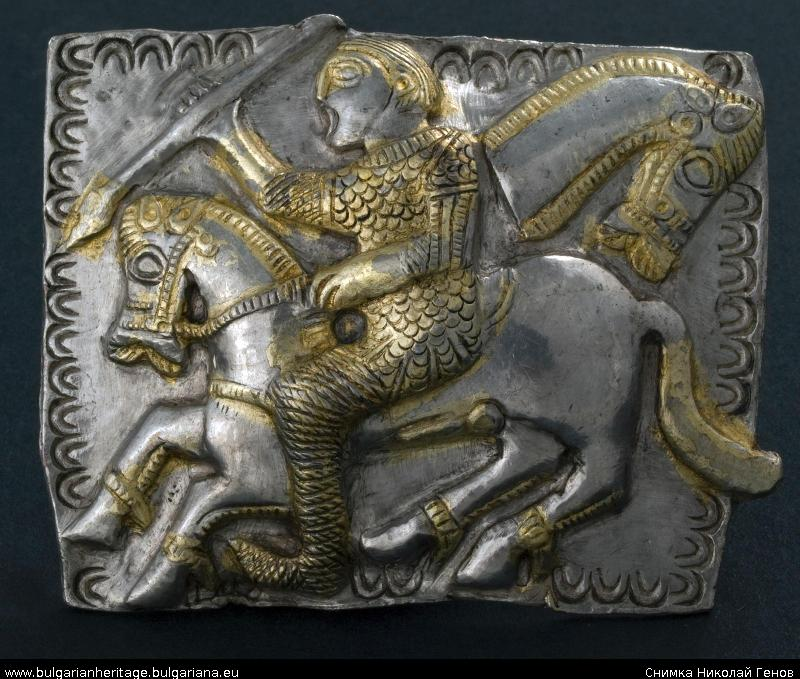
- Silver-gilt plaque depicting a Thracian horseman
- Material: Gilded silver
- Created: 4th century BC
- Present location: Regional Historical Museum, Lovech, Bulgaria

The Letnitsa Treasure (Летнишко съкровище) is a hoard of 4th-century BC Thracian silver-gilt artifacts. The pieces were discovered in 1963 in Letnitsa, Lovech Province, Bulgaria. The collection includes gilded silver plaques, an iron bit, and components of a horse harness associated with Thracian rulers. The artifacts display advanced metalworking techniques and reflect cultural interactions with the Hellenistic world.

== Discovery and historical background ==
The treasure was discovered by accident inside a bronze cauldron buried at a depth of 50–60 cm. The vessel contained small, gold-plated silver plaques. Although local residents initially dispersed the find, archaeologist Pavel Pavlov from the Lovech Museum recovered the complete set.

The hoard is dated to the late 4th or early 3rd century BC. It was deposited during the period of Macedonian expansion under Philip II of Macedon or the subsequent Celtic migrations across the Balkan Peninsula.

== Artistry and stylistic features ==
The plaques were designed as applications for leather straps. Their relief decorations depict elements of Thracian daily life, including attire, hairstyles, and weaponry. Technical analysis and studies indicate that the complete set was manufactured by two master craftsmen. The creation of the treasure is estimated between 385–335 BC, corresponding with the rule of King Cotys I of the Odrysian Kingdom.

== Mythological iconography ==
The decorative program focuses on Thracian religious concepts and social hierarchies. Eight plaques feature the Thracian Rider motif, depicting a horseman galloping, holding a spear, or carrying a ritual phiale. Human and animal heads positioned behind the rider are interpreted as representations of ancestral spirits.

One plaque depicts a Sacred Marriage (Hierogamy) between an embracing male and female figure, symbolizing the ritual union between a hero-king and a mother-goddess to legitimize political authority. Other plaques illustrate a hero undergoing trials, representing a transition to a higher social or religious status.

== Animal style and decorative elements ==
The artifacts utilize the animal style common in Balkan art, combining realistic and mythological creatures. Scenes include animal combat, such as a wolf attacking a deer and a griffin fighting a lion.

An applique depicts a figure facing a triple-headed snake, connected to local chthonic cults or the Greek myth of Heracles and the Hydra. Selective gilding was applied by the craftsmen to emphasize specific details, including horse manes, human hair, and clothing borders.

== Exhibitions ==
The Letnitsa Treasure is regularly included in international archaeological exhibitions. It was featured in the 2015 Sagas of the Thracian Kings exhibition at the Louvre. It was also included in the Ancient Thrace and the Classical World exhibition at the J. Paul Getty Museum in Los Angeles from 2024 to 2025, which analyzed the cultural exchanges between Thrace, Greece, and Rome.

== See also ==
- Borovo Treasure
- Panagyurishte Treasure
- Rogozen Treasure
- Thracian warfare

== Bibliography ==
- Mara Conczewa, Sztuka ziemi trackiej, Państwowy Instytut Wydawniczy, Warszawa 1979.
- Christo Danow, Trakowie, Państwowe Wydawnictwo Naukowe, Warszawa 1987.
- Krzysztof Dąbrowski, Skarby Traków: kultura i sztuka Traków na ziemiach bułgarskich, Państwowe Muzeum Archeologiczne, Warszawa 1976.
- Bulgarian National Television (BNT), "Exhibition dedicated to Thracian culture in the Louvre", 2015.
- Ivan Marazov, Aleksandar Fol, Thrace and the Thracians: Treasures of Bulgaria, St. Martin’s Press, New York 1977.
- Jean-Luc Martinez, Milena Tonkova, Evgeni Paunov, L'épopée des rois thraces: Des découvertes archéologiques majeures en Bulgarie, Musée du Louvre, Paris 2015.
- Atanas Orachev, Antoniy Handjiyski, Bulgaria: The Land of treasures, Borina, Sofia 2006.
- Dimiter Ovcharov, Fifteen treasures from Bulgarian Lands, National Museum of Bulgarian Books, Sofia 2005.
- Bistra Roushkova, "Letnitsa Treasure Appliques Part of Ancient Thrace Getty Museum Exhibition", Bulgarian News Agency (BTA), 2024.
- Jeffrey Spier et al., Ancient Thrace and the Classical World: Treasures from Bulgaria, Romania, and Greece, J. Paul Getty Museum, Los Angeles 2024.
- Ivan Venedikov, Lionel Casson, Thracian treasures from Bulgaria, Metropolitan Museum of Art, New York 1977.
- Ivan Venedikov, Todor Gerasimov, Sztuka tracka, Vol. 1, Arkady, Warszawa 1976.
- Ivan Venedikov, Todor Gerasimov, Sztuka tracka, Vol. 2, Arkady, Warszawa 1978.
