= Valchitran Treasure =

Early Thracian treasure

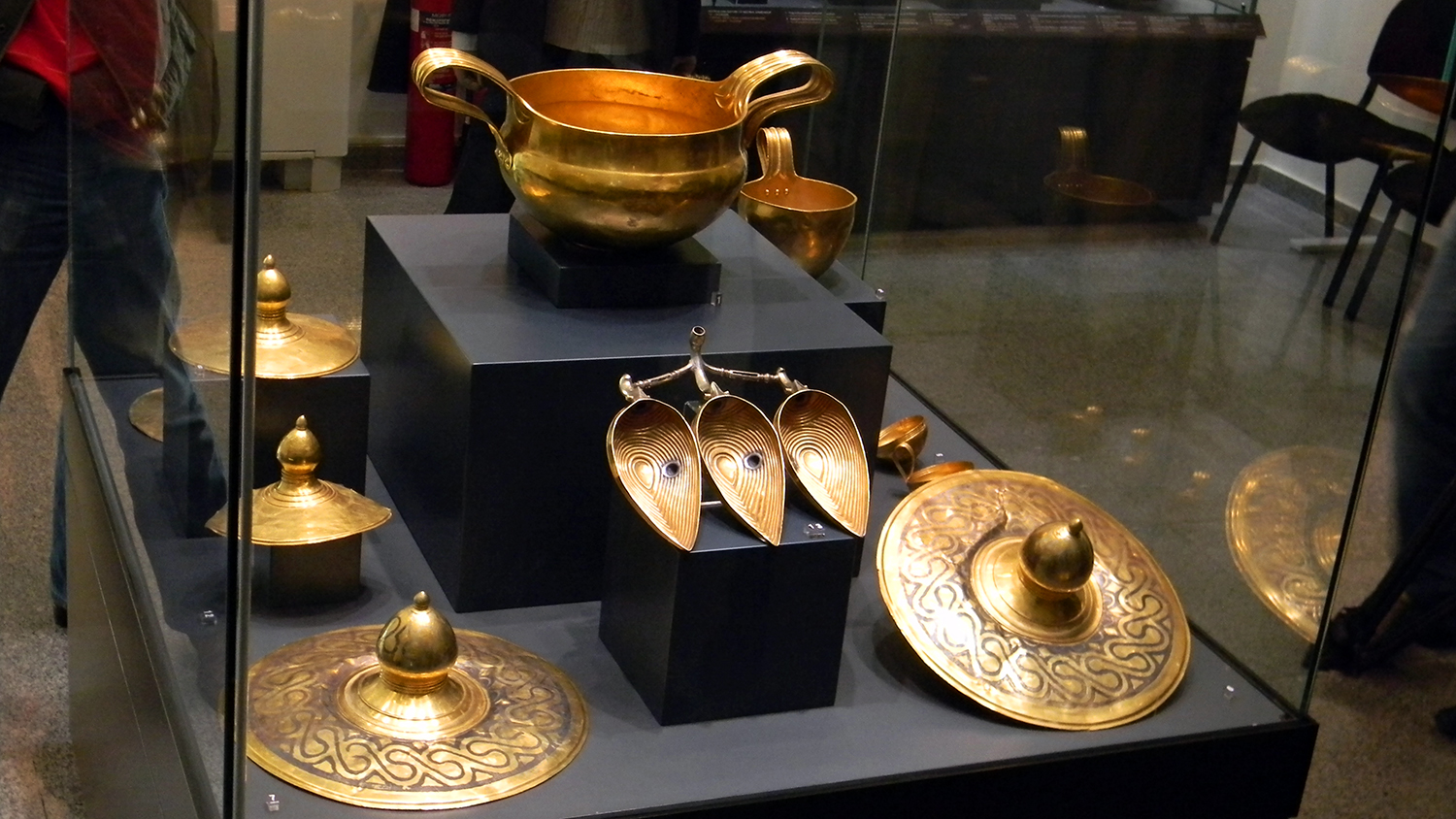
- Material: gold
- Created: 1300 BC
- Discovered: 1924 at Valchitran
- Present location: National Archaeological Museum, Sofia

The Valchitran Treasure or Vulchitrun Treasure (Bulgarian: Вълчитрънско златно съкровище) is an early Thracian treasure.

== Discovery ==
It was discovered on 28 December 1924 by two brothers who were working in their vineyard near the village of Valchitran, 22 kilometres (14 mi) southeast of Pleven, Bulgaria.

== Description ==
The hoard consists of 13 receptacles, different in form and size, and weighs in total 12.5 kilograms (28 lb):

- two round platters
- five round domed pieces, two with central handles
- three cups with handles
- a jug with handle
- three leaf shaped vessels with handles
- a bowl with two handles (4.5 kilograms [9.9 lb] of gold)

The gold metal has a natural mixture of 9.7% silver.

The scientists dated the treasure back to 1300 BC, at the time of the Thracians.

It is now one of the most valuable possessions of the National Archaeological Museum in Sofia.

== See also ==
- History of Bulgaria
- Bronze Age Europe
- Dabene Treasure
- Panagyurishte Treasure
- Rogozen Treasure
- Lukovit Treasure
- Borovo Treasure

== Bibliography ==
- Mikov, V. (1958). Zlatnoto sukrovishte ot Vulchitrun. Sofia: Izdanie na Bulgarskata akademiia na naukite.
- Markotic, Vladimir (July 1959). "Reviewed Work: Zlatnoto Sukrovishte ot Vulchitrun by V. Mikov Pp. 68, figs. 40, pls. XXI, Izdanie na Bulgarskata akademiia na naukite. Sofiia, 1958, Lv. 18.30". American Journal of Archaeology. 63 (3): 285. JSTOR 501853.
- Popovitch, Vladislav (1959). "Encore le Trésor d'orfèvrerie de Vâlčitrân". Revue Archéologique (2): 106–110. JSTOR 41753852.
- Moorey, P. R. S (March 1976). "Thracian Treasures". The Burlington Magazine. 118 (876): 174, 179. JSTOR 878327.
- Casson, Lionel (Summer 1977). "The Thracians". The Metropolitan Museum of Art Bulletin. 35 (1): 2. JSTOR 3258667.
- Venedikov, Ivan (1977). "The Archaeological Wealth of Ancient Thrace". The Metropolitan Museum of Art Bulletin. 35 (1): 13 (color plate 1, figures 11–13). JSTOR 3258668. via- Met Publications
- "The Vulchitrun Treasure (Pleven District); Late Bronze Age, Thirteen to Twelfth Centuries B.C.; Archaeological Museum, Sofia". Thracian Treasures from Bulgaria: Checklist of The Special Exhibition, June 11 - September 4, 1977, coordinated by Dietrich von Bothmer, items 107-119. New York: Metropolitan Museum of Art. 1977 – via Digital Collections of the Metropolitan Museum of Art.
- Marazov, Ivan; Fol, Alexander (1977). Thrace and the Thracians. New York: St. Martin’s Press. pp. 10, 60–64, 145, 148, 149 – via Internet Archive.
- Venedikov, Ivan (1988). The Vulchitrun Treasure. Sofia: Svyat.
- Eisenberg, Jerome M. (January 1998). "The Wealth of the Thracians: A Spectacular Exhibitions of Thracian Treasures Travelling America" (PDF). The International Review of Ancient Art & Archaeology - MINERVA. 9 (1): 9.
- Sotirov, Ivan; Ilieva, Pavlina (2002). Vulchitrun Gold Treasure. Sofia: Borina.
- Valeva, Julia (2015). "Chapter 14: Gold, Silver and Bronze Vessels". In Valeva, Julia; Nankov, Emil; Graninger, Denver (eds.). A Companion to Ancient Thrace. Hoboken: John Wiley & Sons. pp. 197–198.
