= Ganchovski =

Ganchovski, Ganchowski or Ganhovsky is a Polish masculine surname, its feminine counterpart is Ganchovska, Ganchowska or Ganhovska. It may refer to the following people:

- Eliyahu-Moshe Ganhovsky (1901–1971), Israeli politician
- Jordan Ganchovski (born 1953), Bulgarian writer, poet, literary critic and playwright
