= Panagyurishte Treasure =

Thracian treasure

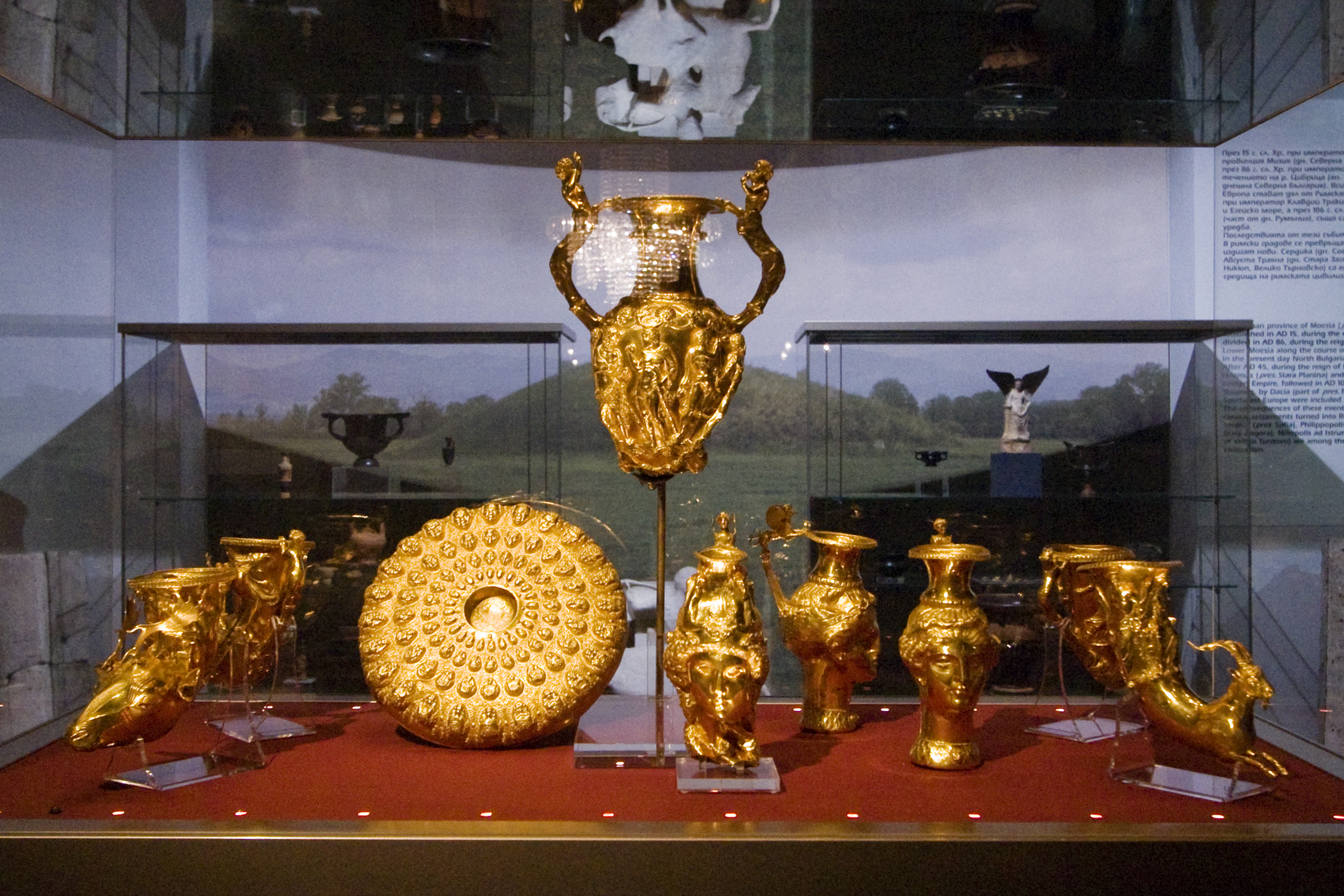
- Material: gold
- Created: 400 BC – 300 BC
- Discovered: 1949 at Panagyurishte
- Present location: Regional Archaeological Museum, Plovdiv

The Panagyurishte Treasure (Bulgarian: Панагюрско златно съкровище), also known as the "Panagyurishte hoard," is a grouping of artifacts of archeological significance accidentally discovered by three factory workers near Panagyruishte, Bulgaria on December 8, 1949. Peter Gorbanov, a curator at a local museum near the site of the find, determined the find to be a spectacular collection of Thracian artifacts. The find was ultimately determined to be from the turn of the fourth to the third century B.C. and was one of the greatest gold hoards ever discovered, at the time.

== Description ==
The treasure consists of a phiale, an amphora-rhyton, and seven rhyta with total weight of 6.164 kilograms (13.59 lb) of 24-karat gold. All nine vessels are richly and skilfully decorated. It is dated from the turn of the 4th-3rd centuries BC. It is thought to have been used as a royal ceremonial set by the Thracian king Seuthes III.

The items may have been buried to hide them during 4th century BC invasions of the area by the Celts or Macedonians. The phiale carries inscriptions giving its weight in Greek drachmae and Persian darics.

== Discovery ==
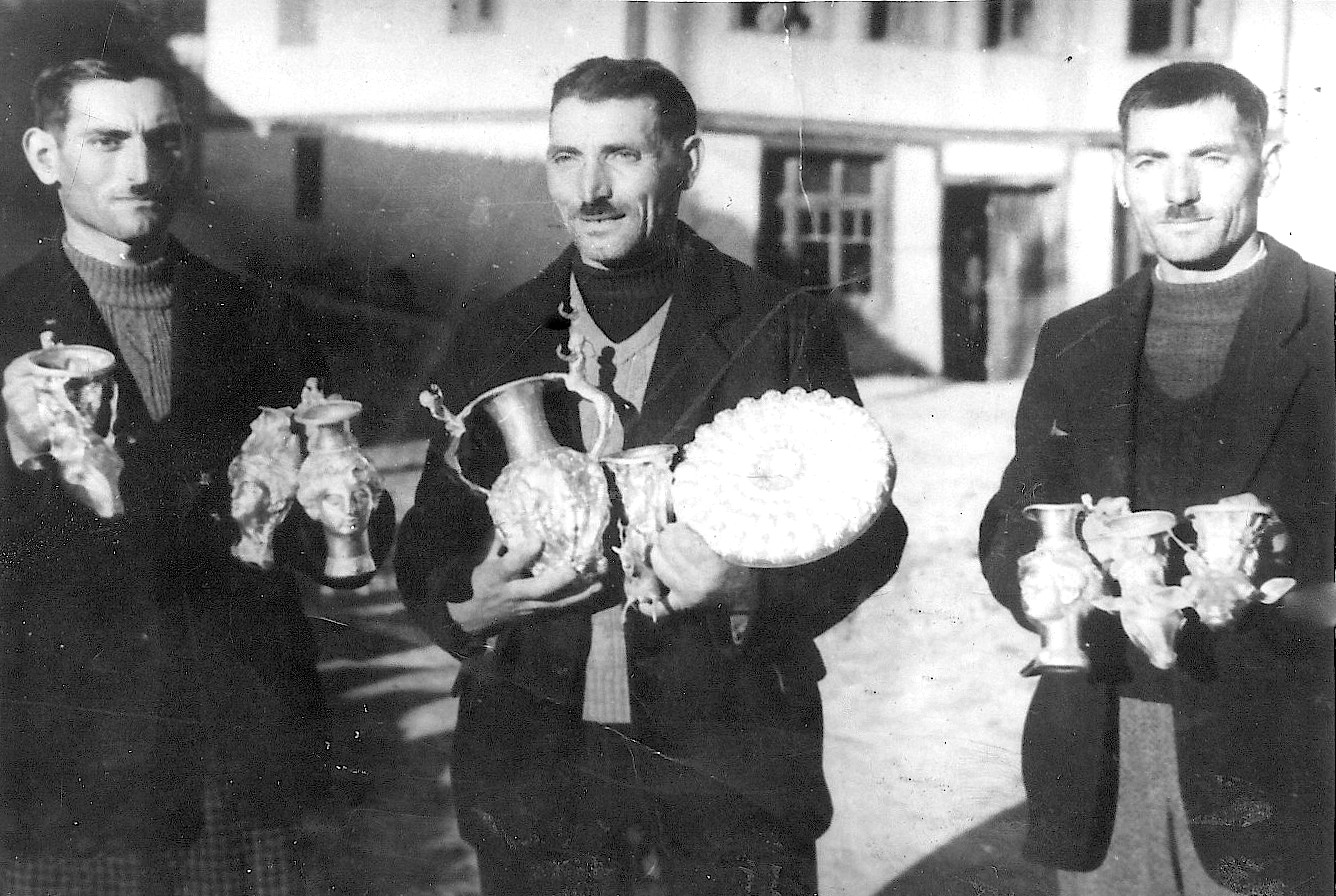
Deikov Brothers holding the treasure

It was accidentally discovered on 8 December 1949 by three brothers, Pavel, Petko, and Michail Deikov, who worked together at the region of “Merul” tile factory near the railway station of the town of Panagyurishte, Bulgaria. At the time of its discovery it was considered "the richest treasure to have been unearthed in Europe since World War II.".

== Exhibitions around the world and replicas ==
As one of the best known surviving artefacts of Thracian culture, the treasure has been displayed at various museums around the world. The treasure is the centerpiece of the Thracian art collection of the Plovdiv Regional Historical Museum, the National Museum of History in Sofia, and the History Museum in Panagyurishte. There are three replica sets, which are displayed in the museums in Panagyurishte, Sofia and Plovdiv, when the authentic treasure is lent for exhibitions abroad.

== Gallery ==
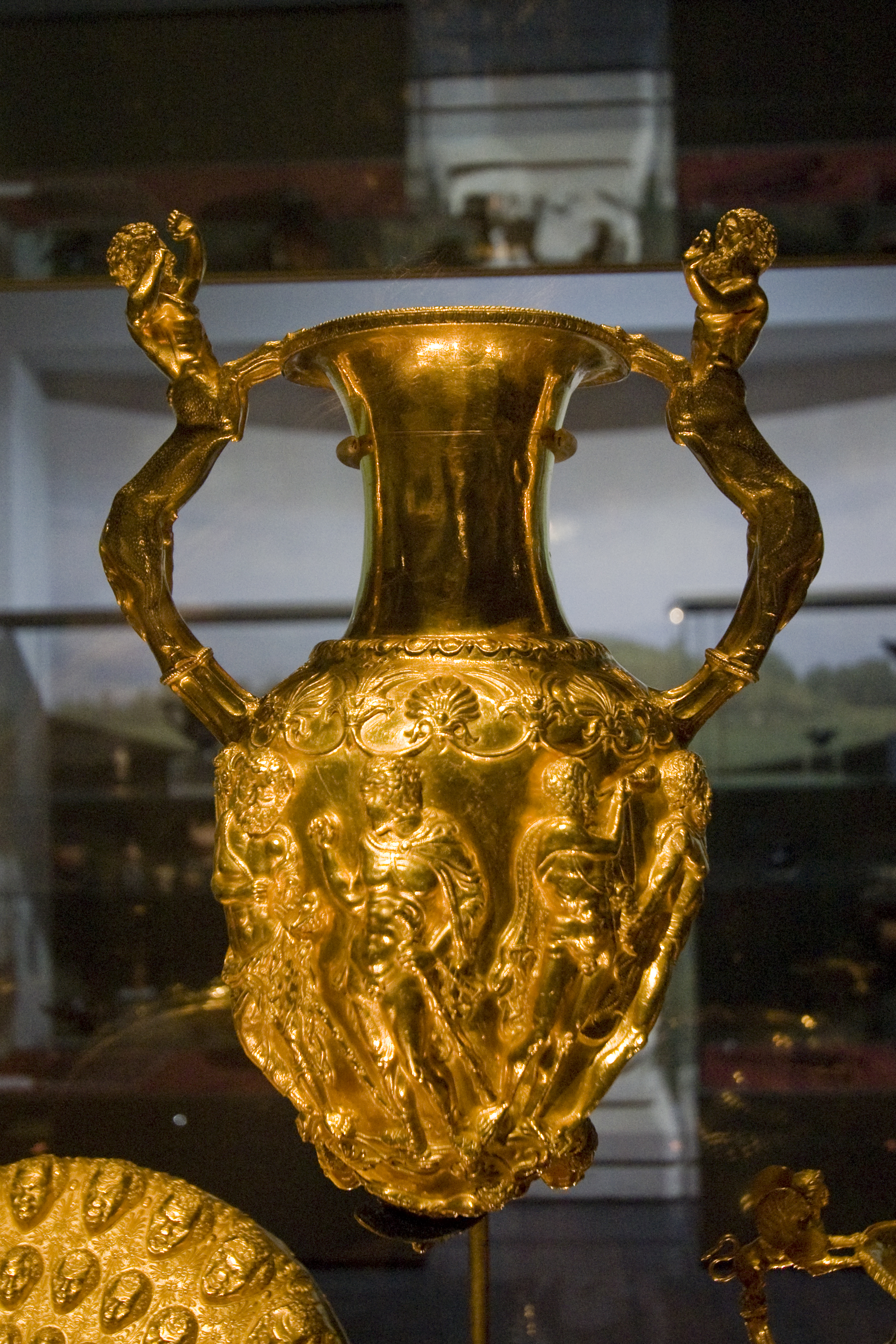

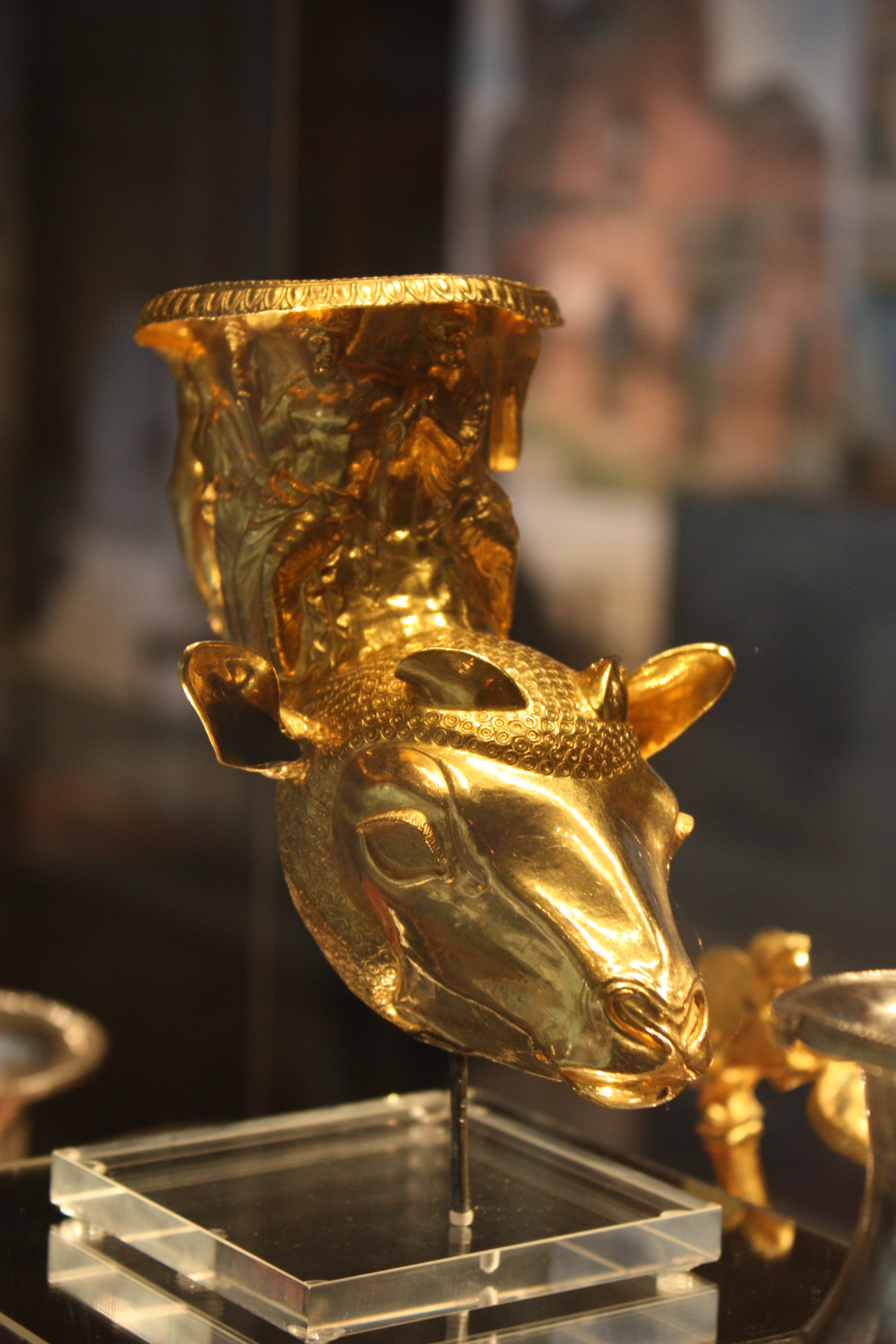

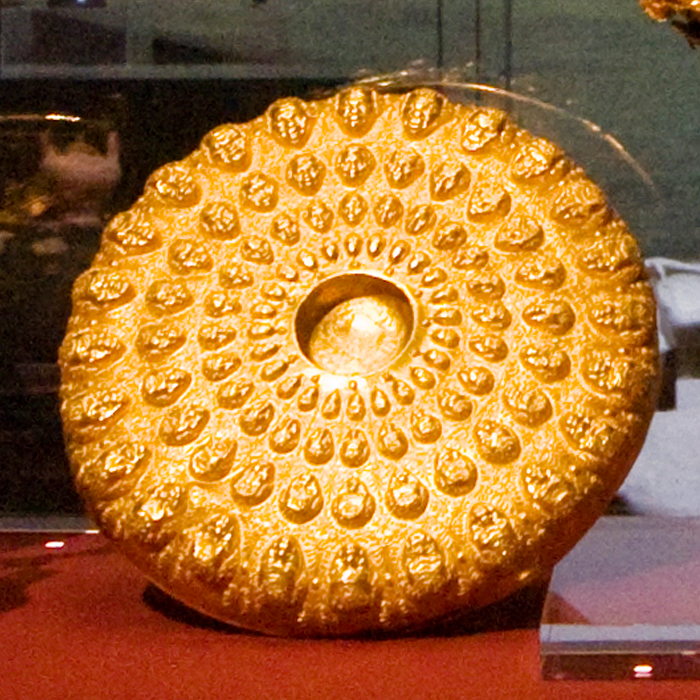

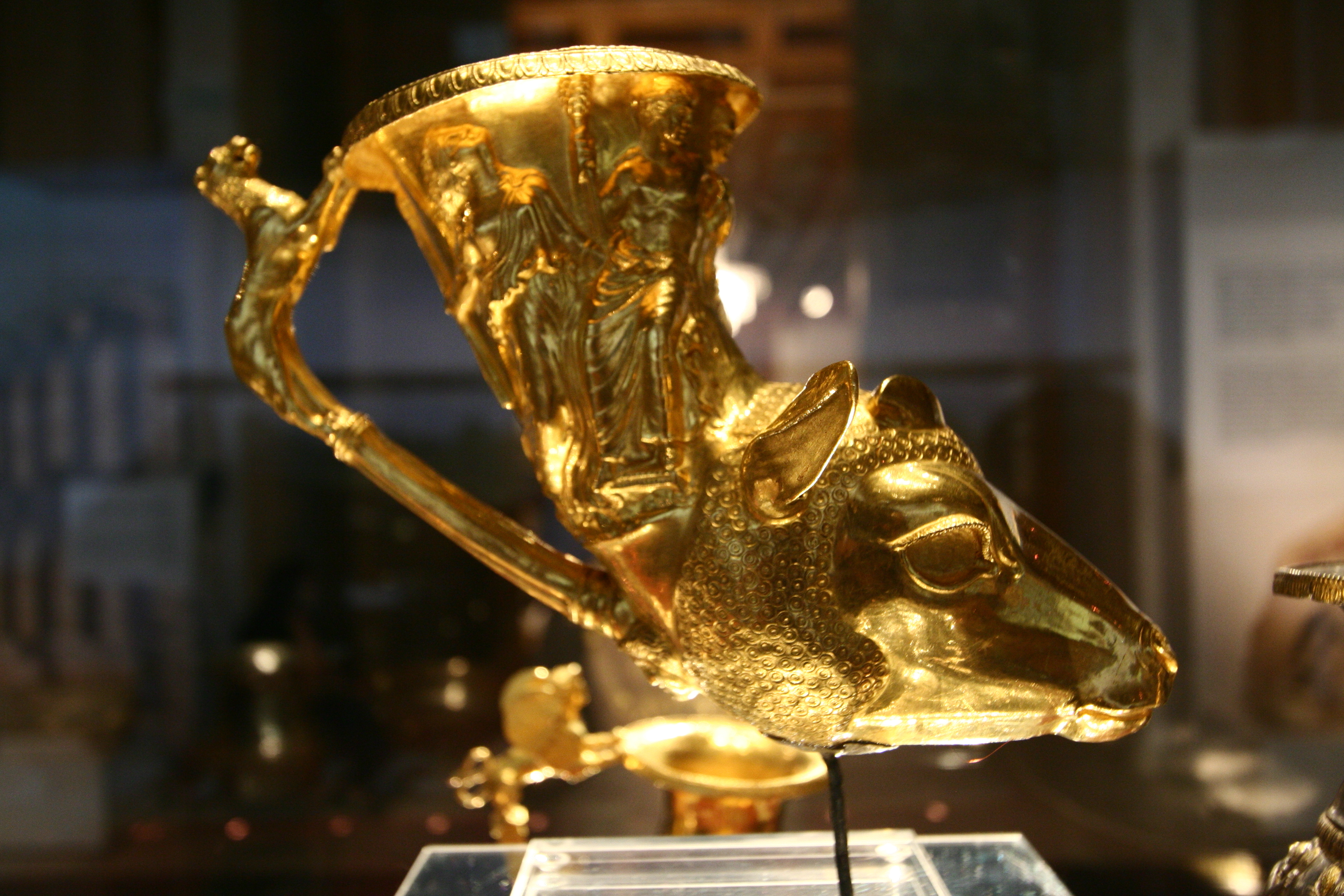

== See also ==
- Rogozen Treasure
- Valchitran Treasure
- Lukovit Treasure
- Borovo Treasure

== Selected bibliography ==
- Tsontchev, Dimiter (1955), "The Gold Treasure of Panagurishte", Archaeology, vol. 8, Archaeological Institute of America, pp. 218–227, JSTOR 41663325
- Venedikov, Ivan (1961). Panagyurskoto sukroviste. Sofia: Bulgarski Hudozhnik.
- von Bothmer, Dietrich (December 1962). "A Gold Libation Bowl". The Metropolitan Museum of Art Bulletin. 21 (4): 154–166. doi:10.2307/3257939. JSTOR 3257939.
- Kontoleon, N.M. (1962), "The Gold Treasure of Panagurischte", Balkan Studies, vol. 3, pp. 185–200
- Corbett, P.E. (1964). "Reviewed Work: Venedikov, (I.) "The Panagyurishte Gold Treasure" Sofia: "Bulgarski Houdozhnik" Publishing House, 1961, Pp. 29, 39 plates. 14 figures". The Journal of Hellenic Studies. 84: 229–231. doi:10.2307/627788. JSTOR 627788.
- Strong, Donald Emrys (1966). Greek and Roman Gold and Silver Plate. London: Methuen & Co. Ltd. pp. 97, 102.
- Griffith, John G. (1974). "The Siege Scene on the Gold Amphora of the Panagjurischte Treasure". Journal of Hellenic Studies. 94: 38–49. doi:10.2307/630418. JSTOR 630418.
- Hoddinott, Ralph F. (1975). Bulgaria in Antiquity: An Archaeological Introduction. London, Tonbridge: Ernest Benn Limited. pp. 85, 89.
- Moorey, P. R. S (March 1976). "Thracian Treasures". The Burlington Magazine. 118 (876): 179–174. JSTOR 878327.
- Marazov, Ivan; Fol, Alexander (1977). Thrace and the Thracians. New York: St. Martin’s Press. pp. 22, 60, 66, 69, 75, 79, 81–85, 100, 111, 153 – via Internet Archive.
- Venedikov, Ivan (1977). "The Archaeological Wealth of Ancient Thrace". The Metropolitan Museum of Art Bulletin. 35 (1): 39 (color plates 9–14). doi:10.2307/3258668. JSTOR 3258668. via- Met Publications
- Kramer, Hilton (June 10, 1977). "Glory of Thrace Shines at MET". The New York Times: 54.
- "The Panagyurishte treasure, Turn of the Fourth and Third Century B.C., Archaeological Museum, Plovdiv, items 361-369". Thracian Treasures from Bulgaria: Checklist of The Special Exhibition, June 11- September 4, 1977, coordinated by Dietrich von Bothmer. New York: Metropolitan Museum of Art. 1977 – via Digital Collections of the Metropolitan Museum of Art.
- Bülow, Gerda von (1987). "The Gold Hoard of Panagyurishte". Treasures of Thrace. Translated by Underwood, Peter. New York: St. Martin's Press. pp. 121-124.
- Vickers, Michael (1989). "Panagyurishte, Dalboki, Lukovit and Rogozen: Questions of Metrology and Status". In Cook, B. F. (ed.). The Rogozen Treasure: Papers of the Anglo-Bulgarian Conference 12 March 1987. London: British Museum Publications. pp. 33–37.
- Moonan, Wendy (May 22, 1998). "ANTIQUES; Rediscovering 'Lost' Culture Of Thrace". The New York Times.
- Rotroff, Susan I. (July–August 1998). "Thracian Glitter: A dazzling display of ancient art". Archaeology. 51 (4): 64–67 – via Archaeology Archive.
- Marazov, Ivan; Fol, Alexander (1998). Ancient gold: The Wealth of the Thracians: Treasures from the Republic of Bulgaria. New York: Harry N. Abrams, in Association with the Trust for Museum Exhibitions, in Cooperation with the Ministry of Culture of the Republic of Bulgaria. pp. 145–148.
- Archibald, Zosia H. (1998). The Odrysian kingdom of Thrace: Orpheus unmasked. Oxford, New York: Clarendon and Oxford University Press. pp. 271–272, 328.
- Kitov, Georgi (2003). The Panagyurishte Treasure. Varna: Slavena Publishing House.
- Fanthrope, Lionel; Fanthorpe, Patricia (2009). Secrets of the World's Undiscovered Treasures. Toronto, Ontario: Dundurn. p. 72.
- Guzzo, Pier Giovanni; Spatafora, Francesca; Vassalo, Stefano (2010). "Una phiale d'oro iscritta dall'entroterra di Himera /An inscribed golden phial from the hinterland of Himera: from Sicily to New York and back". Mélanges de l'École française de Rome: Antiquité (122–2): 451–477. doi:10.4000/mefra.303.
- Chary, Frederick B. (2011). The Greenwood Histories of the Modern Nations: THE HISTORY OF BULGARIA. Santa Barbara, CA; Denver, CO; Oxford, England: Greenwood, An Imprint of ABC-Clio, LLC. pp. 1, 145.
- Ovadiah, Asher (2014). "A New Look at the Mythological Representation of the Panagyurishte Gold Treasure, Bulgaria". Gerión. 32: 137–155.
- Valeva, Julia (2015). "Chapter 14: Gold, Silver and Bronze Vessels". In Valeva, Julia; Nankov, Emil; Graninger, Denver (eds.). A Companion to Ancient Thrace. Hoboken: John Wiley & Sons. pp. 202–203.
- Holt, Frank Lee (2016). The Treasures of Alexander the Great: How One Man's Wealth Shaped the World. Oxford University Press. p. 47.
