= Chicagoan (disambiguation) =

A Chicagoan is a native or resident of the city of Chicago (see Demographics of Chicago).

Chicagoan may also refer to:

- Chicagoan (ATSF train), American passenger train running between Chicago and Kansas City
- Chicagoan (NYC train), American passenger train running between Chicago and New York
- Chicagoan (DLW train), American passenger train running between Hoboken and Chicago
- The Chicagoan, American magazine (1926–1935) modeled after The New Yorker
