= Rogozen =

Rogozen Рогозен
- Location of Rogozen
- Coordinates: 43°31′06″N 23°41′53″E
- Country: Bulgaria
- Province (Oblast): Vratsa

Government
  - Mayor: Ivan Beshirovski
- Elevation: 125 m (410 ft)

Population (2009-03-15)
  - Total: 1,111
- Time zone: UTC+2 (EET)
  - Summer (DST): UTC+3 (EEST)
- Postal Code: 3360
- Area code: 09169

Rogozen (Bulgarian: Рогозен [ˈrɔɡozɛn]) is a village in Northwestern Bulgaria. It is located in Hayredin Municipality, Vratsa Province.

Rogozen is famous for its Rogozen treasure.

== Notabilities ==
Jordan Ganchovski, a now US-based Bulgarian writer, poet, literary critic and playwright, was born in Rogozen.

== See also ==
- List of villages in Vratsa Province
- Rogosin
