= Jordan Ganchovski =

Bulgarian writer (born 1953)

- Born: September 25, 1953 (age 72); Rogozen
- Occupations: Writer, Literary critic

Jordan Ganchovski is a Bulgarian writer, poet, literary critic and playwright. He owns the American publishing house The World Publishing in Illinois. His literary-critical research focuses on avant-garde literature as well as social anthropology and cultural heritage. Ganchovski is the chief editor of Zlatorog and The Chicagoan and World Reports. He wrote the novel Night of the Tenth Day, which is the novel with shortest story-time in world literature history.

== Biography ==
Ganchovski was born on September 25, 1953, in the village of Rogozen, Vratsa district. He graduated from the School of Mechanics in Vratsa. He began publishing in 1977 while he was a student at Voronezh State University. In 1978, he was expelled from the Soviet Union and began his higher education in journalism at Sofia University. He wrote for the criticism department of the newspaper Literary Front before working at the Union of Bulgarian Writers until 1985. From 1985 to 1991 he was editor of the publishing house "National Youth". In 1988, he was banned from working with young writers. In 1991, he was removed permanently from the publishing house. The same year, he participated in the founding of the daily publication of the opposition movement, "Support". In 1992, he moved to the U.S. where he established and began publishing the newspaper "EK", and later the newspaper "Zlatorog". He became the chief editor of the magazine The Chicagoan and World Reports in 2005. He is founder and chairman of the literary circle "Georgi Markov".

== Bibliography ==
- Winter Sowing - 1985
- Back to the roots - 1989
- Letters sent by Wind - 1998, 1999, 2000
- Fragments 2003
- Stone ship - 2000, 2005, 2007
- Korno - Comedy - 2010

== Honors ==
- 1981 Gold Medal for literary criticism
- 1982 National Poetry Competition - Shumen - First Prize
- 1985 Special Award for first book - National Competition, Haskovo
- 2000 and 2001 Nomination for poet of the year by the International Society of Poets in New Jersey, US
- 2005 Grand Prize of the editors of the International Library of Poetry - US.
