= Valchitran =

Village in Pleven Province, Bulgaria

Coordinates: 43°20′N 24°52′E

Valchitran (Bulgarian: Вълчитрън [ˈvɤɫt͡ʃiˌtrɤn]) is a village in Pleven Province, central northern Bulgaria. The Thracian-era Valchitran treasure was discovered nearby.

Valchitran has Nikita Khrushchev as an honorary citizen. Khrushchev was on his way to Sofia in a plane, when the plane experienced technical difficulties and had to land in Kamenetz, Pleven Oblast, a small town nearby which had a military airfield. Khrushchev had to pass through Valchitran in order to get to Sofia.
