= National Archaeological Museum, Bulgaria =

Coordinates: 42°41′46.79″N 23°19′28.43″E

National Archaeological Institute with Museum at the Bulgarian Academy of Sciences (Национален археологически институт с музей при Българска академия на науките)
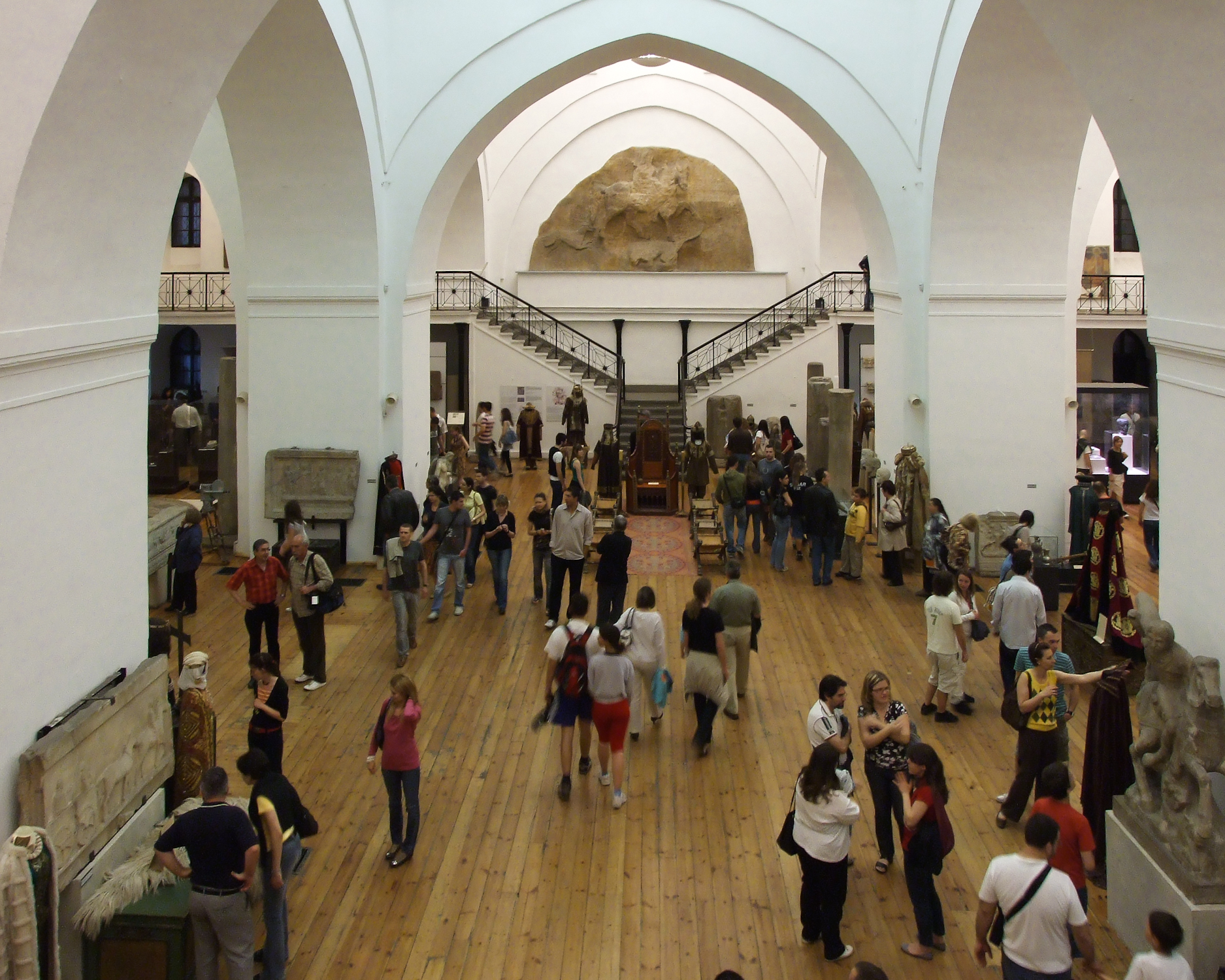
- Interior of the first floor
- Established: 1892
- Location: Sofia, Bulgaria
- Type: Archaeological museum and research institute
- Director: Hristo Popov
- Website: http://naim.bg/en/home/

The National Archaeological Museum (Bulgarian: Национален археологически музей, Natsionalen arheologicheski muzey) is an archaeological museum in the centre of Sofia, the capital of Bulgaria. It occupies the building of the largest and oldest former Ottoman mosque in the city, originally known as Koca Mahmut Paşa Camii. The construction started in 1451 under grand vizier Veli Mahmud Pasha but due to his death in 1474 the mosque was completed in 1494. The museum was established as a separate entity in 1893 as the National Museum directed by Czech Václav Dobruský with its headquarters in the former mosque that previously housed the National Library between 1880 and 1893.

The museum was officially opened and inaugurated in 1905, as by then all archaeological exhibits previously kept all over the city were moved there, in the presence of Knyaz Ferdinand of Bulgaria and Minister of Enlightenment Ivan Shishmanov.

Several additional halls and administrative buildings of the museum were constructed in the following years, which continues to use the historic stone building of the old mosque despite the often unfavourable conditions, notably the humidity in the summer. The museum has five exhibition halls: Central Hall, Prehistory, Middle Ages, Treasure, and a special temporary exhibition. It is managed by the Bulgarian Academy of Sciences.

== History ==
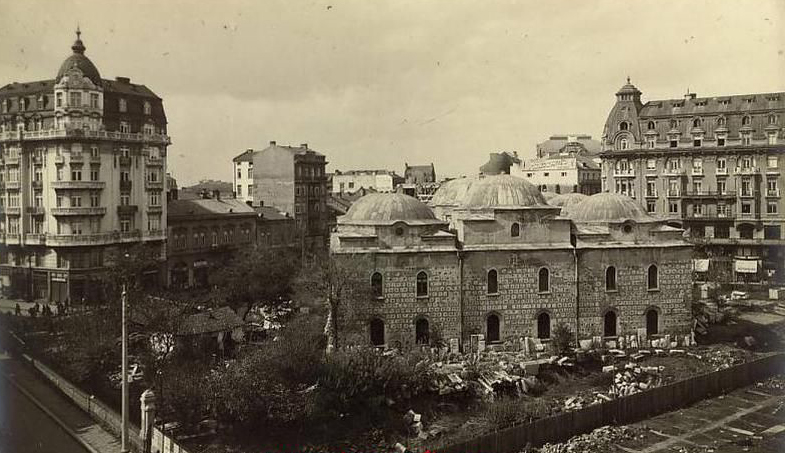
The museum around 1920

The idea for the creation of an archaeological institute with a museum was conceived among exiled Bulgarian intellectuals in the 1840s, and was among the top priorities for the Bulgarian Literary Society immediately after its establishment in 1869. During the interim Russian administration immediately after the Liberation of Bulgaria, the first steps towards the establishment of a national archaeological museum were taken. In 1892, the institution was de jure established through a decree by the Knyaz, and the assembly of its collections began the next year. Initially it was also known as a "Museum-temple of the Fatherland".

Until 1906, the museum included a collection of ethnographic items. By this year however, the collection was becoming so vast that it had to be separated and displayed in a separate institution, which became the Ethnographic Museum of Sofia. Since its foundation, the Museum works actively in cooperation with the Bulgarian Archaeological Society. In 1920 an Archaeological Institute headed by Bogdan Filov was established as an independent institution. It was merged with the museum in 1948 and is under the auspices of the Bulgarian Academy of Sciences ever since.

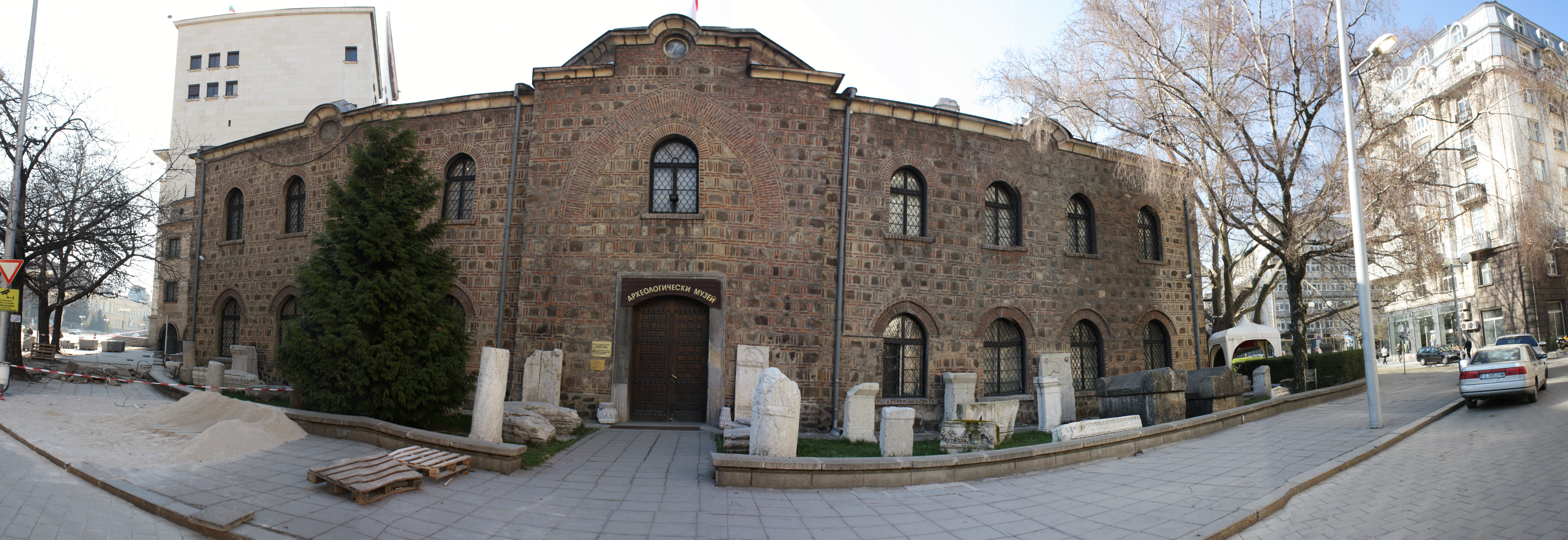
The museum today

After World War II the joint institution launched a series of archaeological expeditions inside Bulgaria. They conducted studies on a number of sites from the Chalcolithic to the early Middle Ages, which resulted in a number of additional artifacts being added to the museum collection. Today the museum stores a large number of items, although some of them are threatened by damage due to the design of the building, which is characterised by high moisture levels during the summer season.

== Collections ==
- Prehistory Hall - located at the lower floor of the northern wing. It displays a collection of items dating from between 1,600,000 BC and 1,600 BC. The collection is chronologically displayed and includes various findings from caves around Bulgaria, tools of the earliest humans who inhabited its modern territory, drawings, simple pottery, ritual items and many others.

It subdivides into an Early, Middle and Late Paleolithic collection, Neolithic collection, Chalcolithic collection, and Bronze Age.

- Treasury - located in the eastern wing and displays grave inventory and other treasures from the late Bronze Age to late Antiquity. Two of the most well-known Bulgarian treasures are located here: the Valchitran and Lukovit Treasures.
- Main Hall - located at the first floor of the main building. Hosts a collection of diverse items ranging from ancient Thrace, Greece and Rome to the late Middle Ages.
- Medieval Section - located at the second floor of the main building. Includes a gallery of medieval books, woodwork, drawings, metal objects and other items characteristic of the era.
- Temporary Exhibitions - the hall is located at the second floor of the main building.
