= Phiale =

Phiale may refer to:

- Phiale (spider), a genus of spiders of the family Salticidae (jumping spiders)
- Phiale, an ancient Greek libation bowl; see patera
- Phiale (Bithynia), a town of ancient Bithynia, now in Turkey
- Phiale (building), an enclosed or arcaded fountain
