= Lukovit Treasure =

Thracian silver hoard

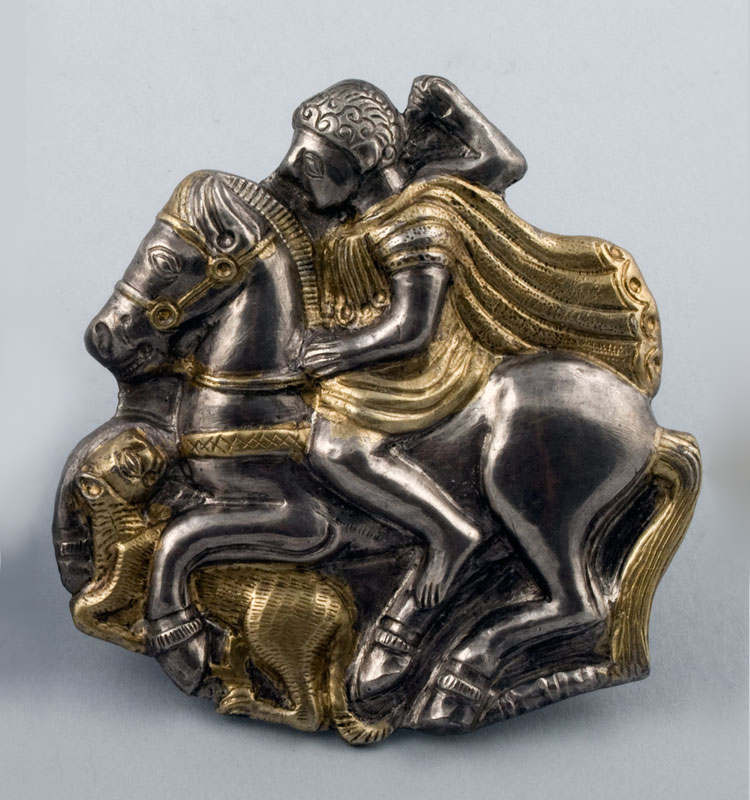
- A horseman, wearing a flowing chlamys and tunic, attacks a lion with a spear.
- Material: silver
- Created: 300 BC
- Discovered: 1953 at Lukovit

The Lukovit Treasure (Bulgarian: Луковитско съкровище) is a silver Thracian treasure. It was discovered in 1953 near the town of Lukovit, Lovech Province, northwestern Bulgaria.

== Description ==
It consists of two groups of objects: plates, applications for horse bridles and vessels, 9 phiales, 3 ewers and a bowl.

The objects are made of silver, some of them gilded in order to reinforce the artistic images and to put emphasis on the ornaments. Phiales and the bowl are richly adorned with ornaments, depicting floral shapes, human heads and other artistic elements. On the applications various animals are portrayed, including lion, gryphon, dog, and stag.

There are also depictions of equestrians, typical of Thracian art. On two of the plates there is a lion jumping on a deer, which kneels under the weight of the beast. Another plate depicts two horsemen chasing lions, which are already overtaken and fallen under the hooves of the horses. These scenes in the Thracian art bear a certain social meaning. They are connected to glorifying the royal power. The rulers and their companions did spread by all possible means the legends for their exceptional divine origin and even by the trimming of the horse bridles made the common subjects to have faith and to obey.

The Lukovit Treasure is dated from 4th century BC and was made by different craftsmen. It was most probably buried in the ground during Alexander the Great's invasion of the north-western Thracian lands.

== Gallery ==
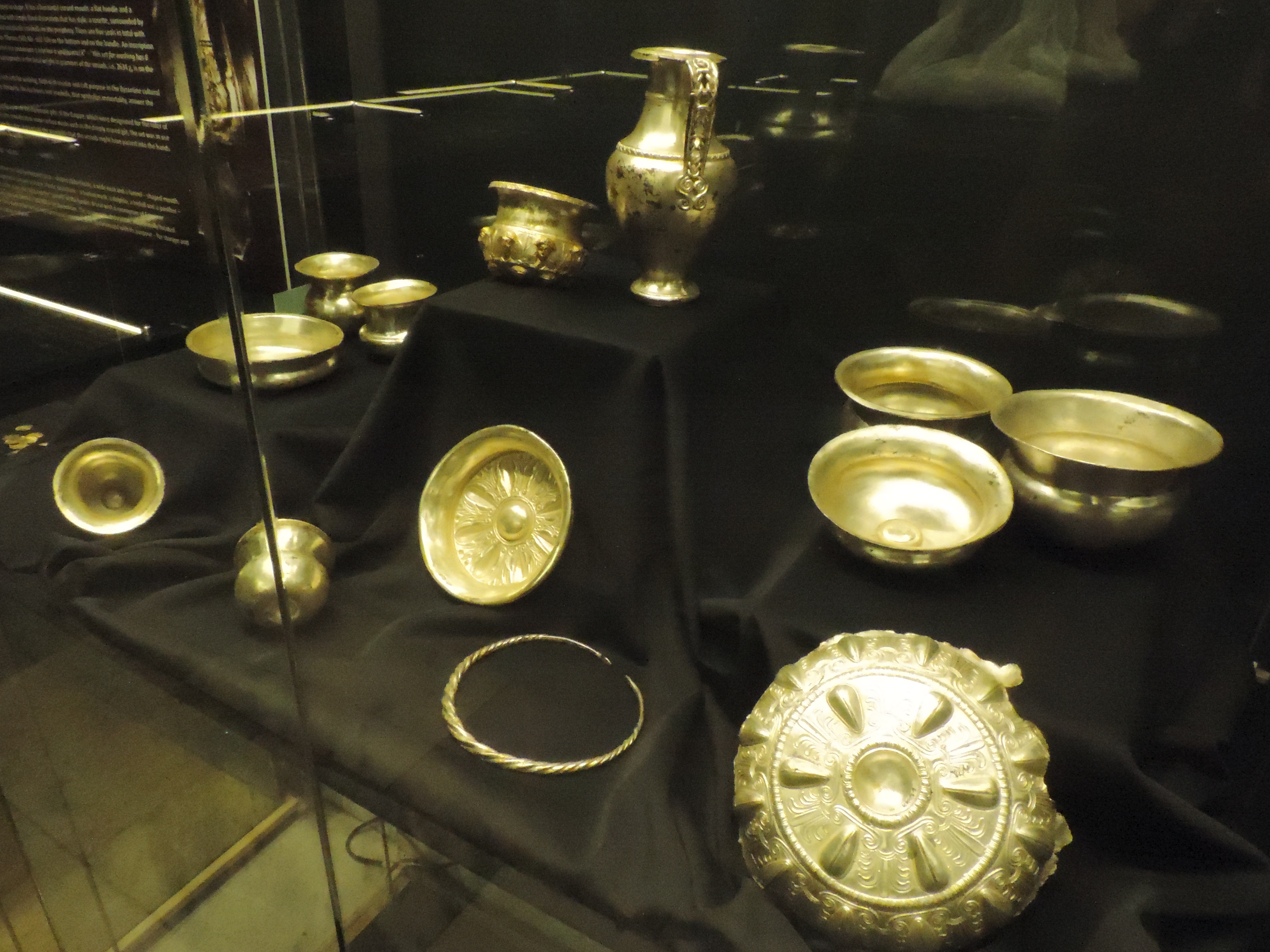

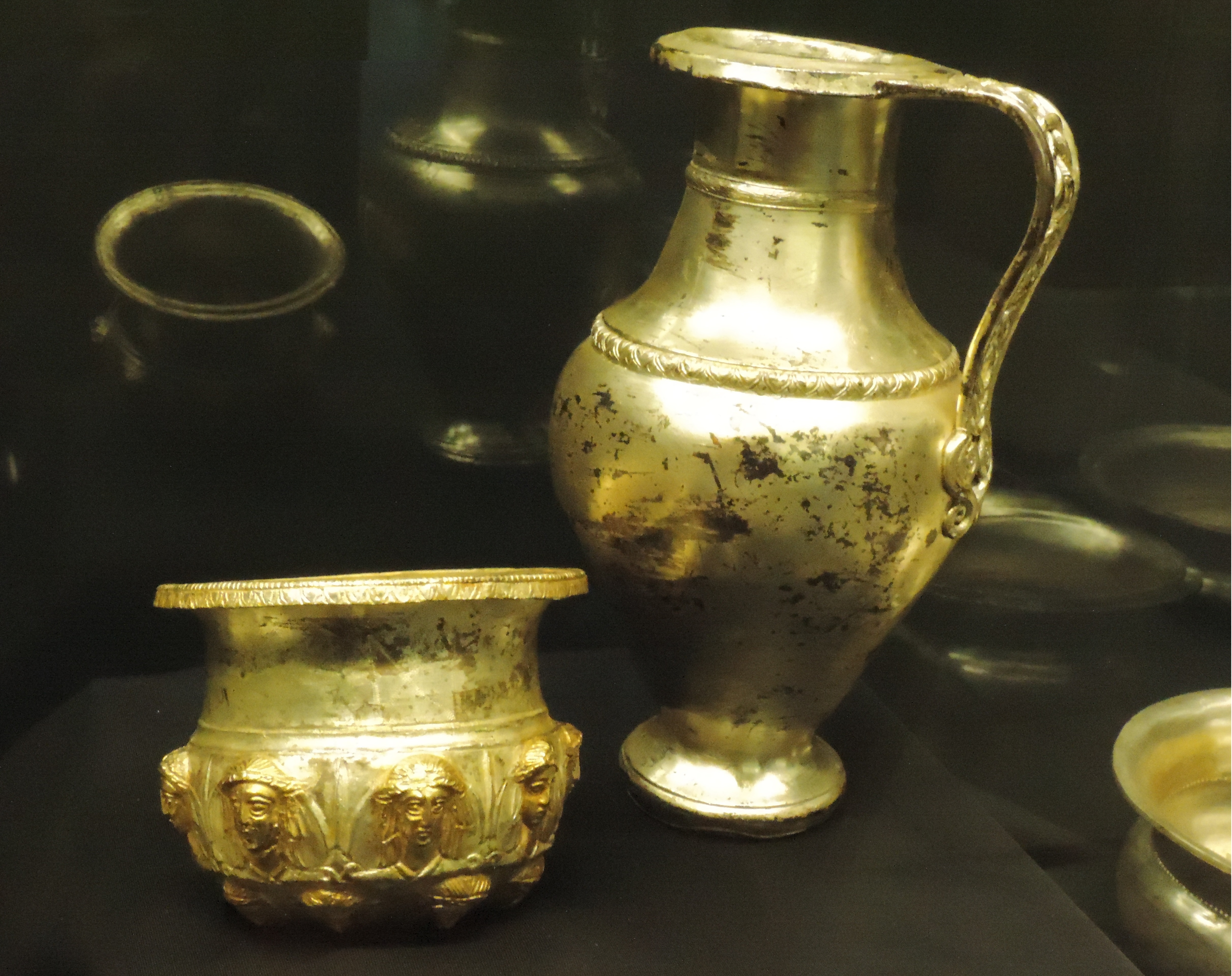

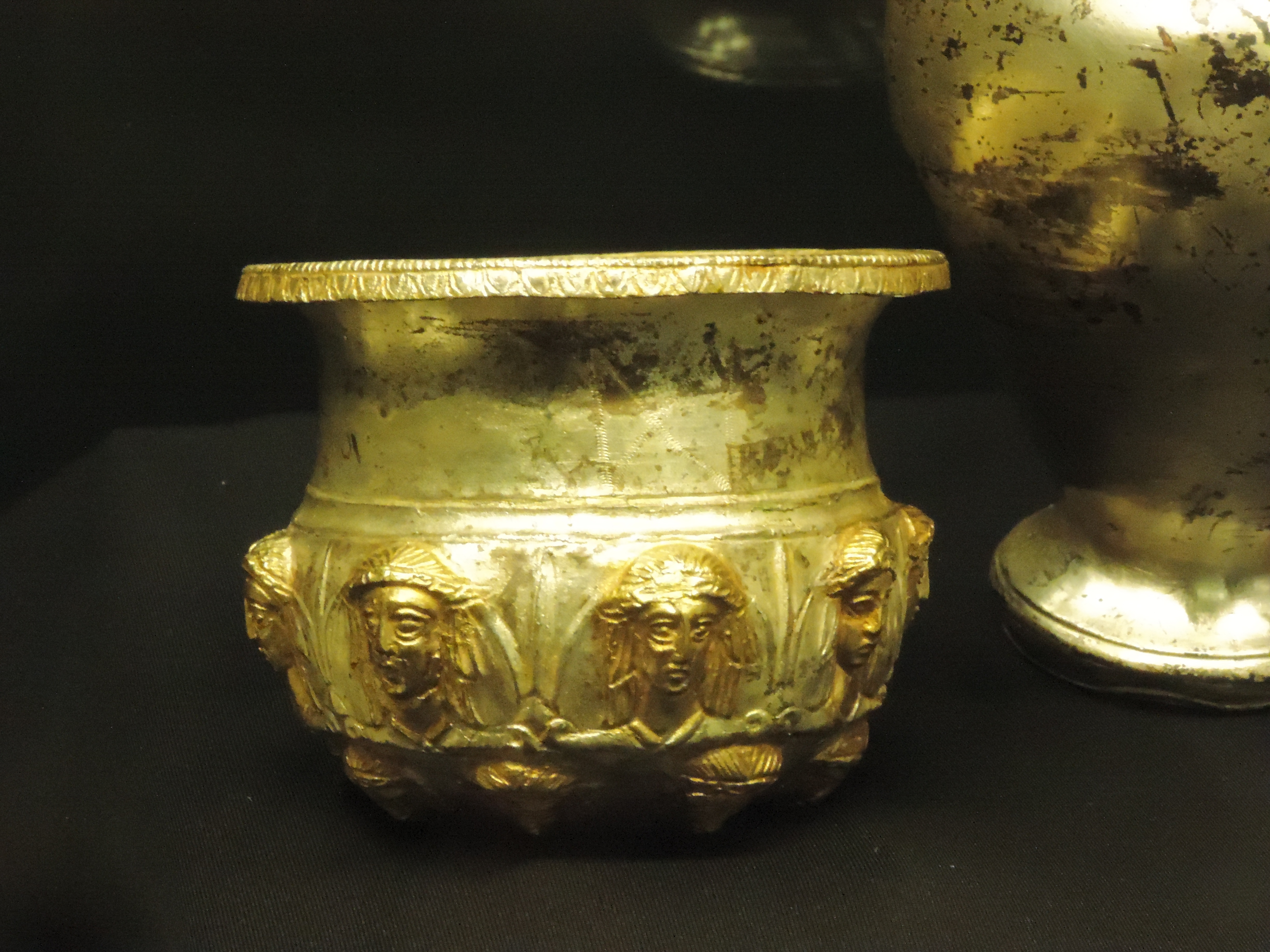

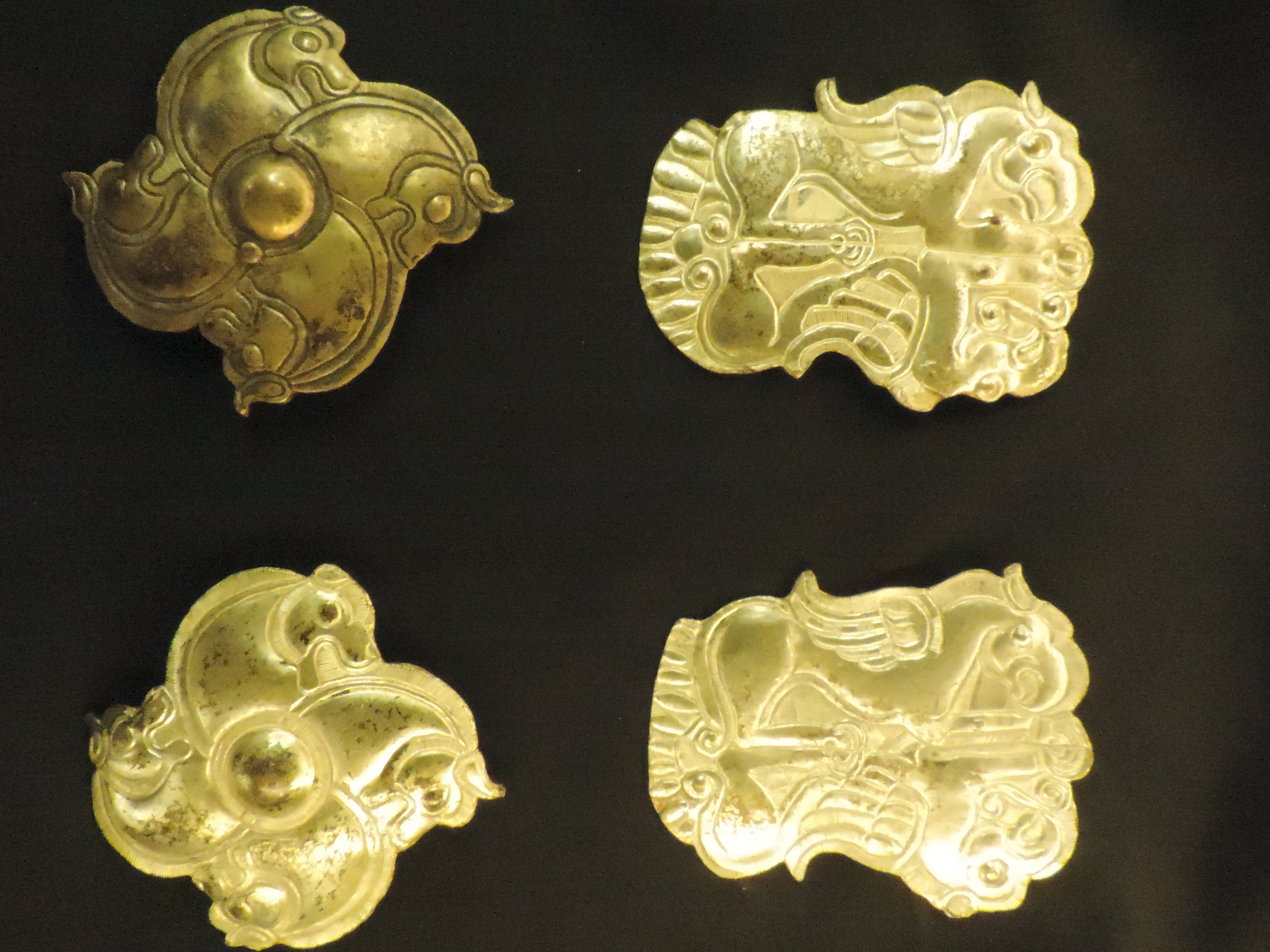

== See also ==
- Panagyurishte Treasure
- Rogozen Treasure
- Valchitran Treasure
- Borovo Treasure

== Sources ==
- Casson, Lionel (Summer 1977). "The Thracians". The Metropolitan Museum of Art Bulletin. 35 (1): 6. JSTOR 3258667.
- Venedikov, Ivan (1977), "The Archaeological Wealth of Ancient Thrace", The Metropolitan Museum of Art Bulletin, 35 (1): 61 (color plate 8, figure 40), JSTOR 3258668 via- Met Publications
- "The Loukovit Treasure; End of the Fourth Century B.C. Archaeological Museum, Sofia", Thracian Treasures from Bulgaria: Checklist of The Special Exhibition, June 11 - September 4, 1977, coordinated by Dietrich von Bothmer, items 326-348, New York: Metropolitan Museum of Art, 1977 – via Digital Collections of the Metropolitan Museum of Art
- Thracian Treasures from Bulgaria; 12 May - 1 July, 1979, Nagoya City Museum; items 326-348. Tokyo: The Chunichi Shimbun, The Tokyo Shimbun. 1979.
- Vickers, Michael. "Panagyurishte, Dalboki, Lukovit and Rogozen: Questions of Metrology and Status". In Cook, B.F. (ed.). Rogozen Treasure: Papers of the Anglo-Bulgarian Conference, 12 March 1987. London: British Museum Publications. pp. 33–37.
- Eisenberg, Jerome M. (January 1998), "The Wealth of the Thracians: A Spectacular Exhibitions of Thracian Treasures Travelling America" (PDF), The International Review of Ancient Art & Archaeology - MINERVA, 9 (1): 17
- Paunov, Evgeni I. (1998), "Thracian Treasures from Bulgaria (Ancient Treasures from Thracian Tombs)", Athena Review, 1 (4): 79
- Valeva, Julia (2015), "Chapter 14: Gold, Silver and Bronze Vessels", in Valeva, Julia; Nankov, Emil; Graninger, Denver (eds.), A Companion to Ancient Thrace, Hoboken: John Wiley & Sons, p. 198
