= National Historical Museum, Bulgaria =

Museum in Sofia, Bulgaria

National History Museum
- Национален исторически музей
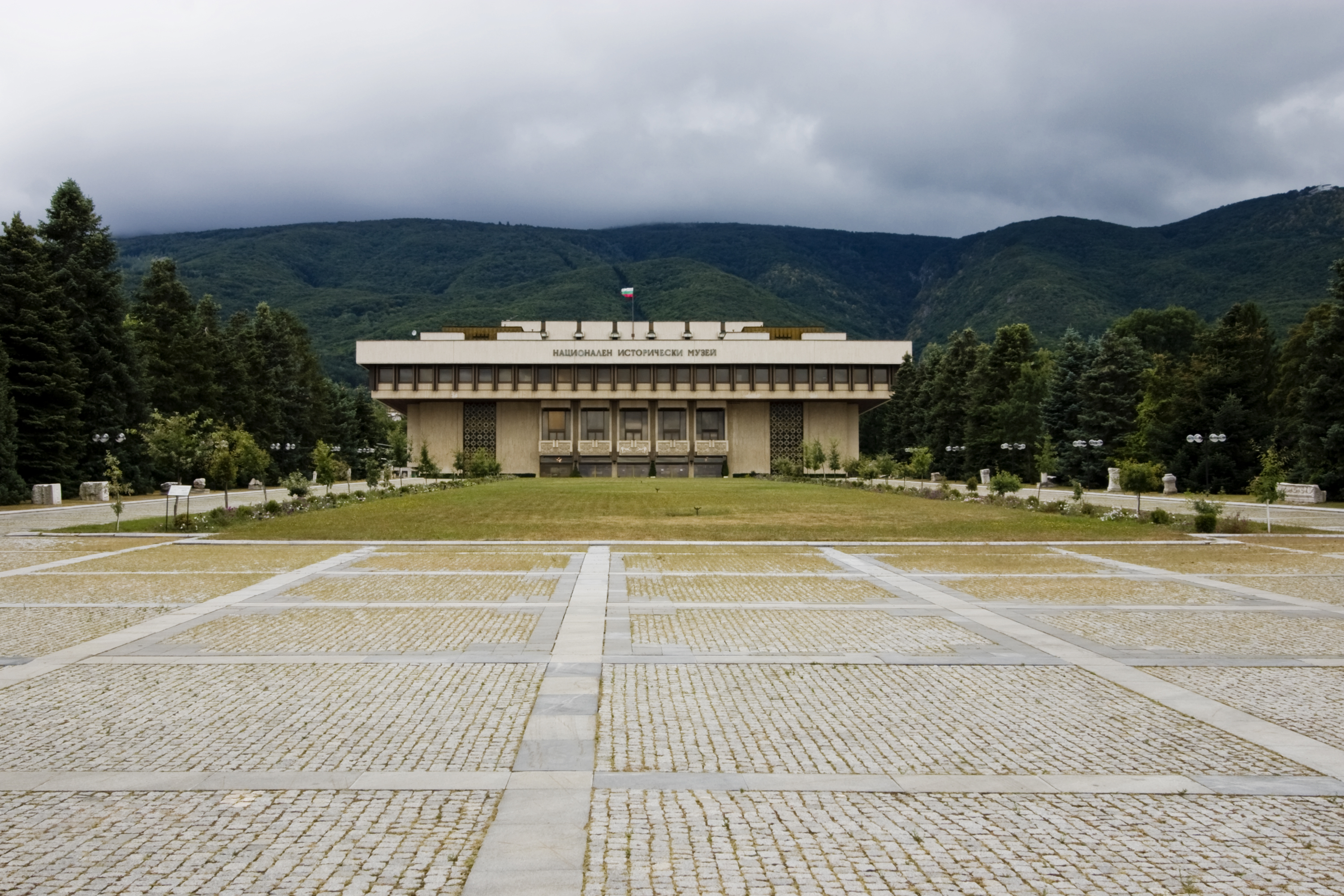
- Frontal view of the National Historical Museum and its yard
- Established: 5 May 1973
- Location: Sofia, Bulgaria
- Coordinates: 42°39′17.91″N 23°16′14.89″E
- Website: www.historymuseum.org

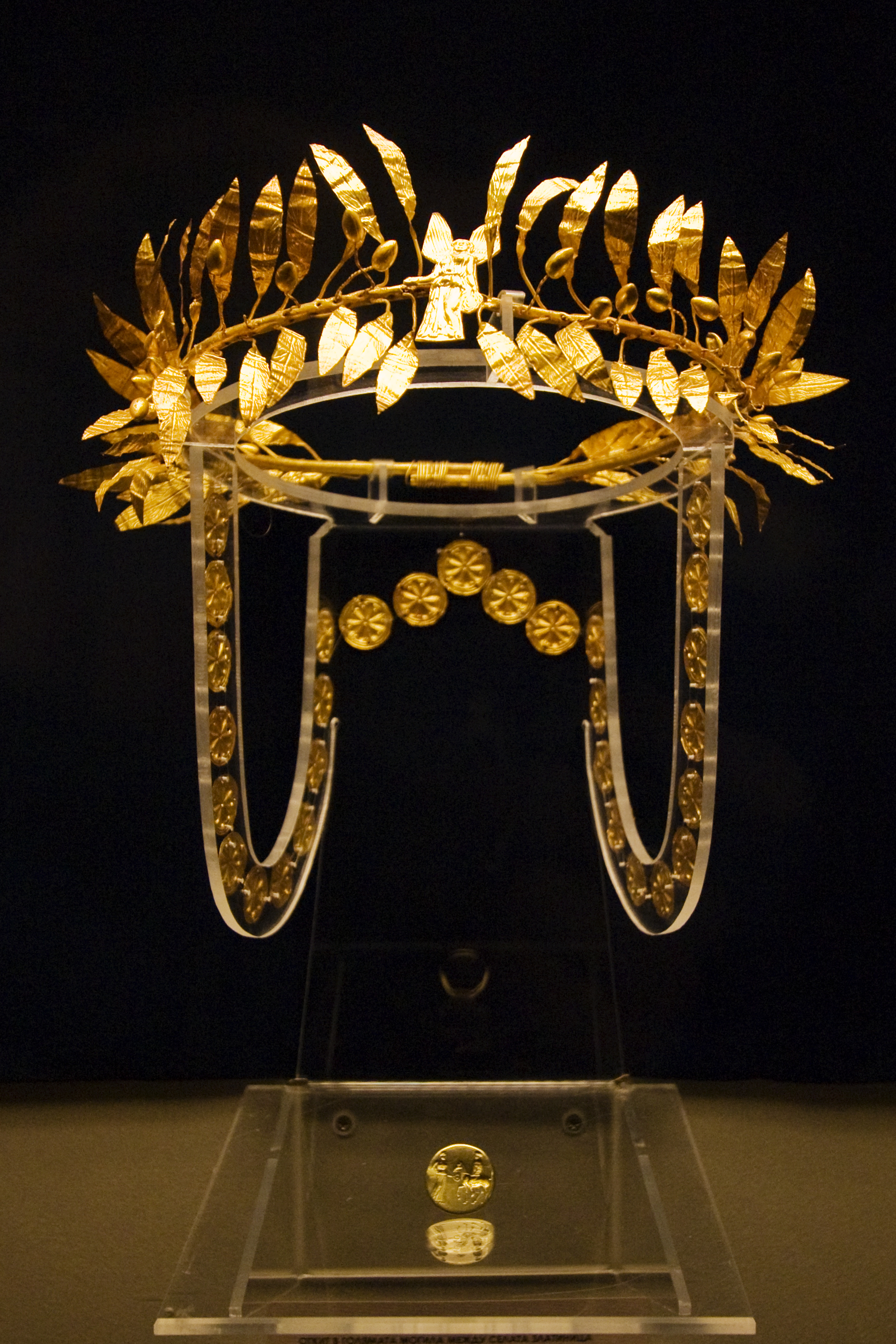
Wreath of an Odrysian aristocrat, 4th century

The National Historical Museum (Национален исторически музей, Natsionalen istoricheski muzey) in Sofia is Bulgaria's largest museum. It was founded on 5 May 1973. A new representative exhibition was opened in the building of the Court of Justice on 2 March 1984, to commemorate the 13th centenary of the Bulgarian state. The museum was moved in 2000 to one of the major buildings in the complex serving as official residence of the President, Vice President and Government of the Republic of Bulgaria., and currently contains over 650,000 objects connected to archaeology, fine arts, history and ethnography, although only 10% of them are permanently exhibited.

The museum includes a cloakroom, cafe, library and souvenir shop. It undertakes professional conservation and restoration of historical monuments, authenticity investigations and expert valuation. Its collections comprise materials dating from prehistoric ages till the present.

Major excavated exhibits include:

- Valchitran Treasure
- Dabene Treasure
- Rogozen Treasure (part)
- Panagyurishte Treasure (either replicas or the real objects)

== See also ==
- Decree of Dionysopolis
- List of museums in Bulgaria
