= Borovo Treasure =

Thracian hoard

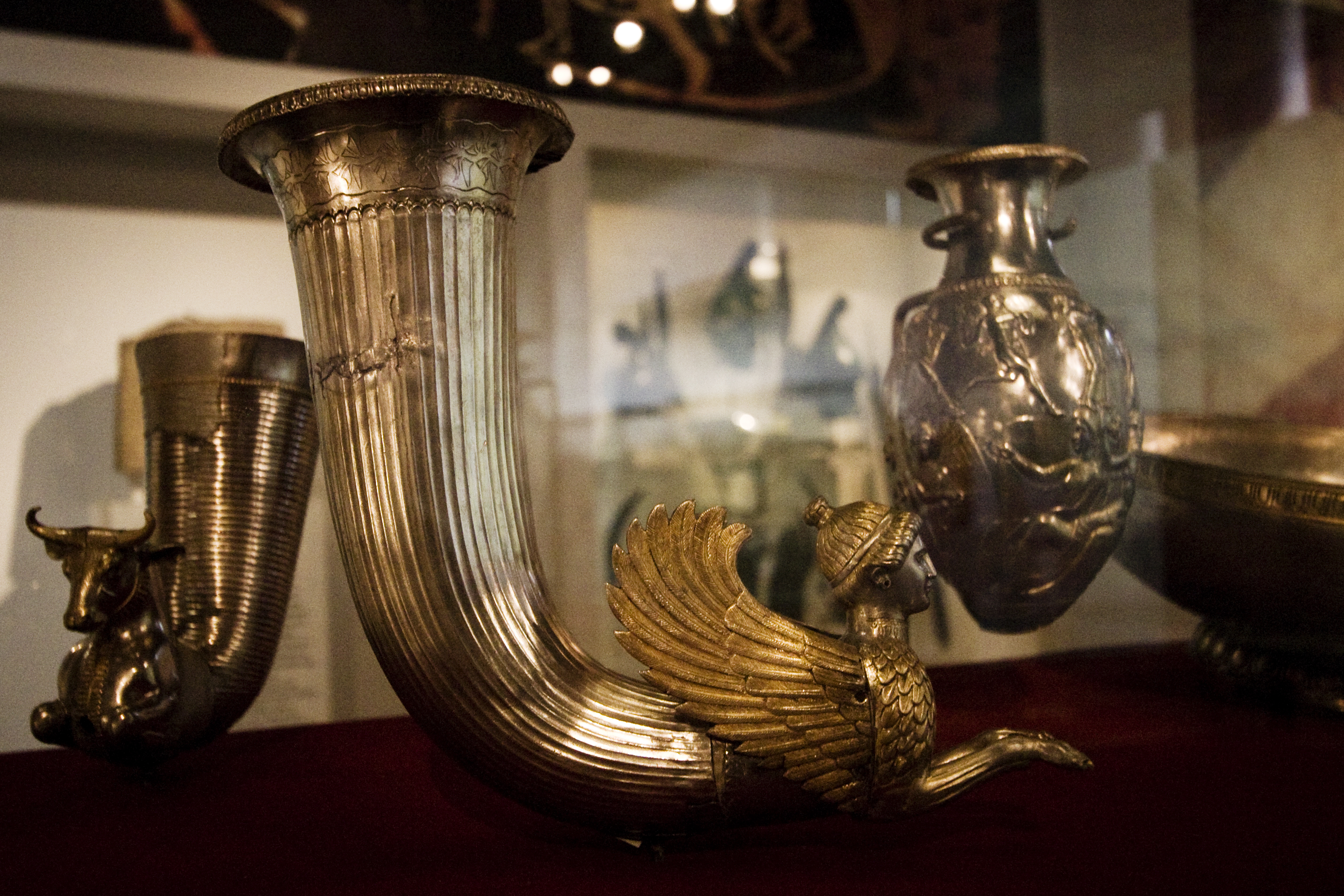
- Material: silver
- Created: 383 BC – 359 BC
- Discovered: 1974 at Borovo
- Present location: Rousse Regional Historical Museum

The Borovo Treasure, also known as the Borovo Silver Treasure, is a Thracian hoard of five matching silver-gilt items discovered in late 1974 while ploughing a field in Borovo, Bulgaria.

The treasure is kept in the history museum at Ruse.

== Items ==
The treasure consists of a table set of five silver-gilt items:

- Three rhyta, each a different size, and with a different base. The largest has a figure of a sphinx and bears the inscription: "[Belongs to] Cotys from [the town of] Beos.", as well as the name of the craftsman, Etbeos. The second has a figure of a horse, and the third, the smallest, has a bull. Each are half figures.
- A large, two-handled bowl: This item is decorated with a relief of a deer being attacked by a griffin.
- A rhyta jug with images gods at a feast, scenes showing the mythological cycles, with images of Dionysus and Heracles, satyrs, griffons, and sphinxes.

== Discovery ==
The discovery was made while ploughing a field approximately 2 kilometres (1.2 mi) from the village of Borovo, Ruse, in Bulgaria. Unfortunately, the plow severely damaged objects, but after extensive restoration work, the damage is nearly invisible.

It is unknown why the treasure was buried at that particular site since no tumulus was found at the location.

== Origins ==
The inscription on the sphinx rhyta indicates that the treasure may have been a gift to a local Getic ruler from the king Cotys I (382-359 BC), who reigned in the Odrysian Kingdom from 383 to 359 BC. It is for this reason that the treasure is considered to be from the early to mid fourth century BC.

== Gallery ==
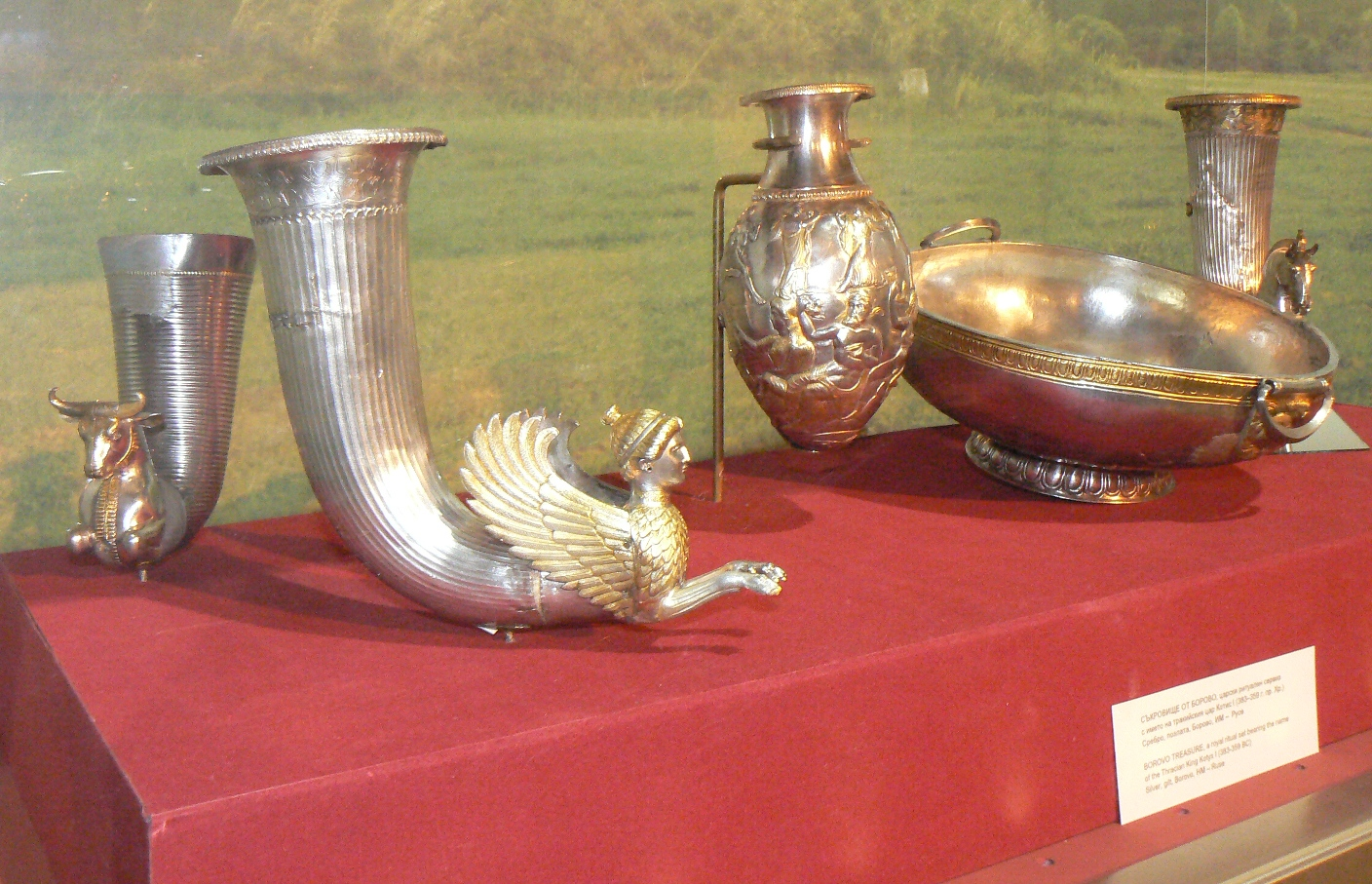

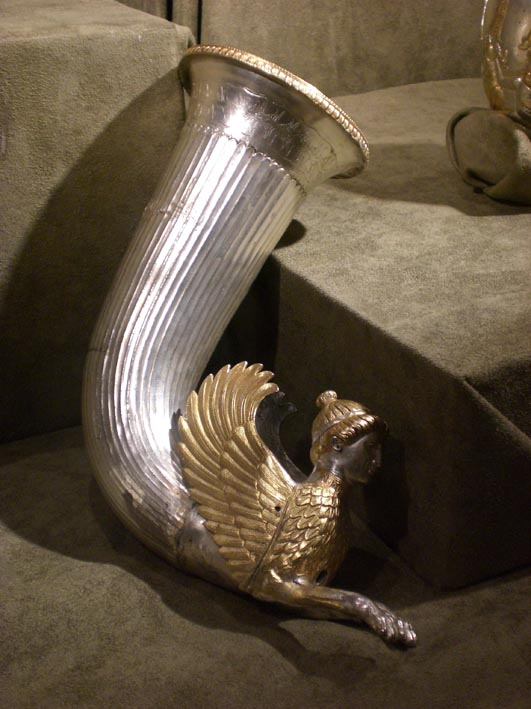

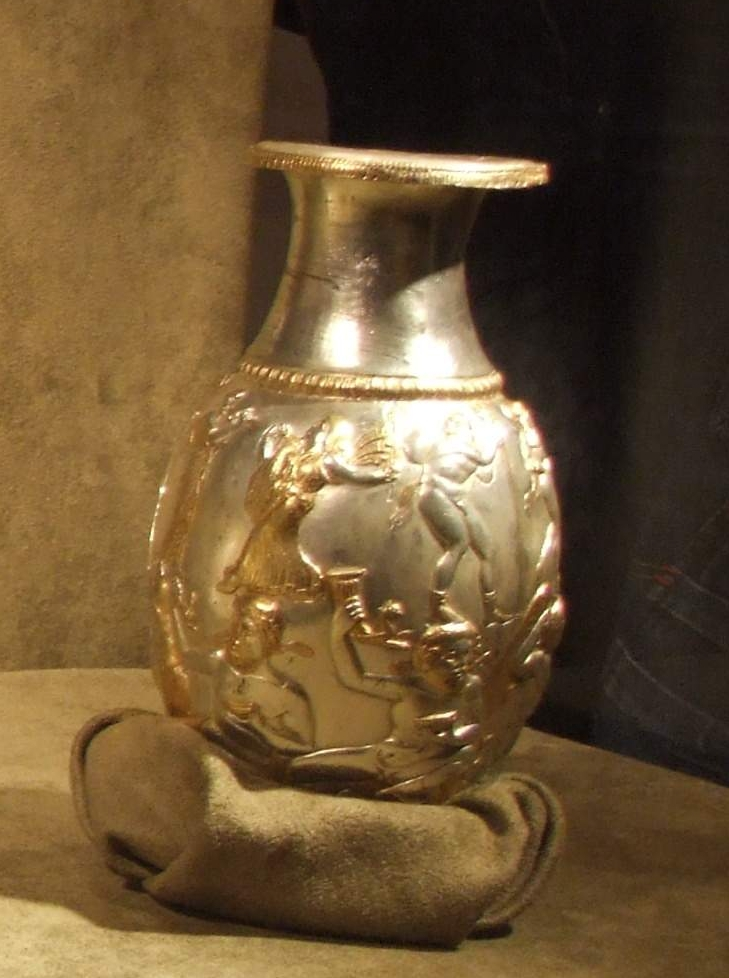

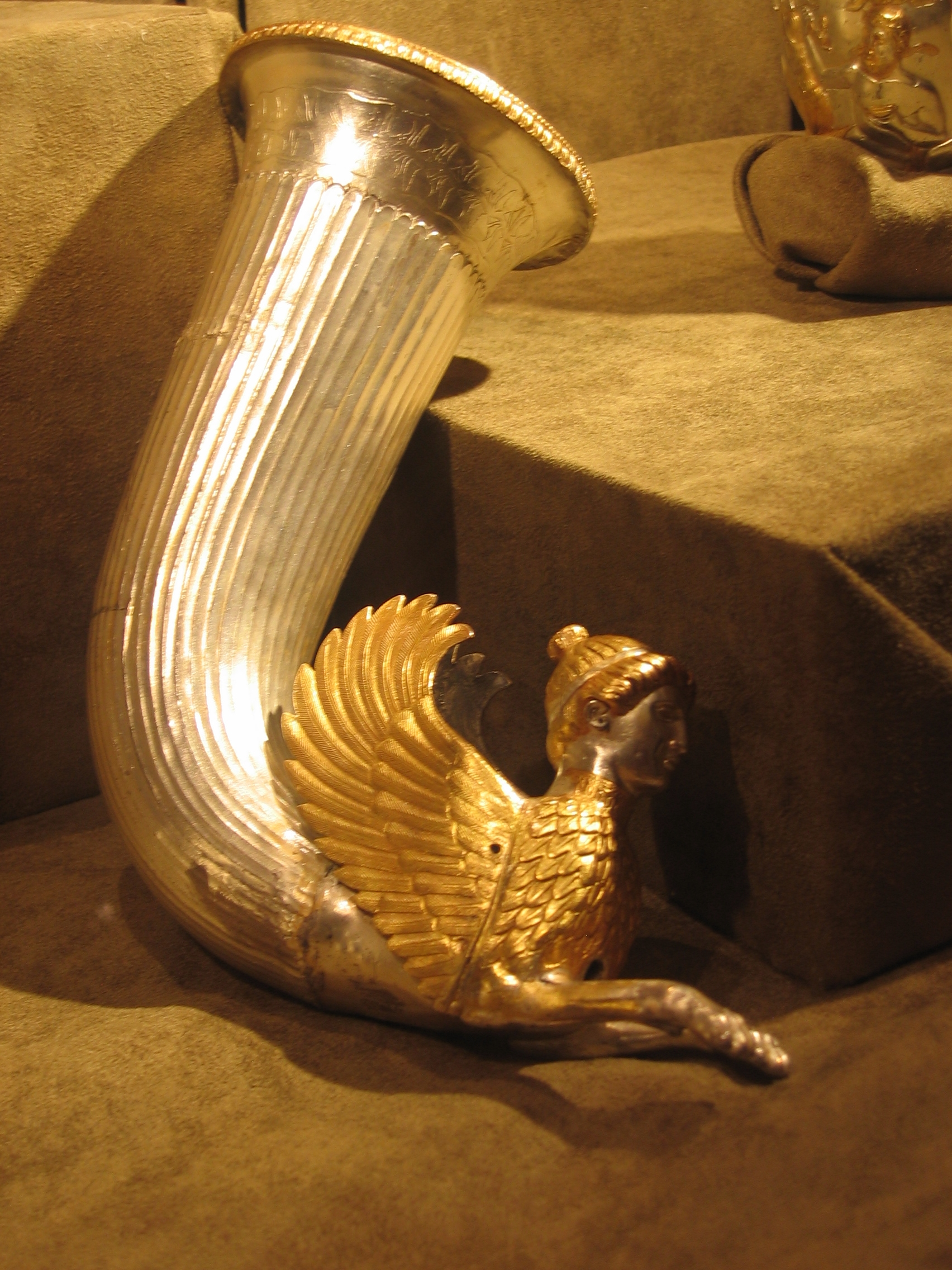

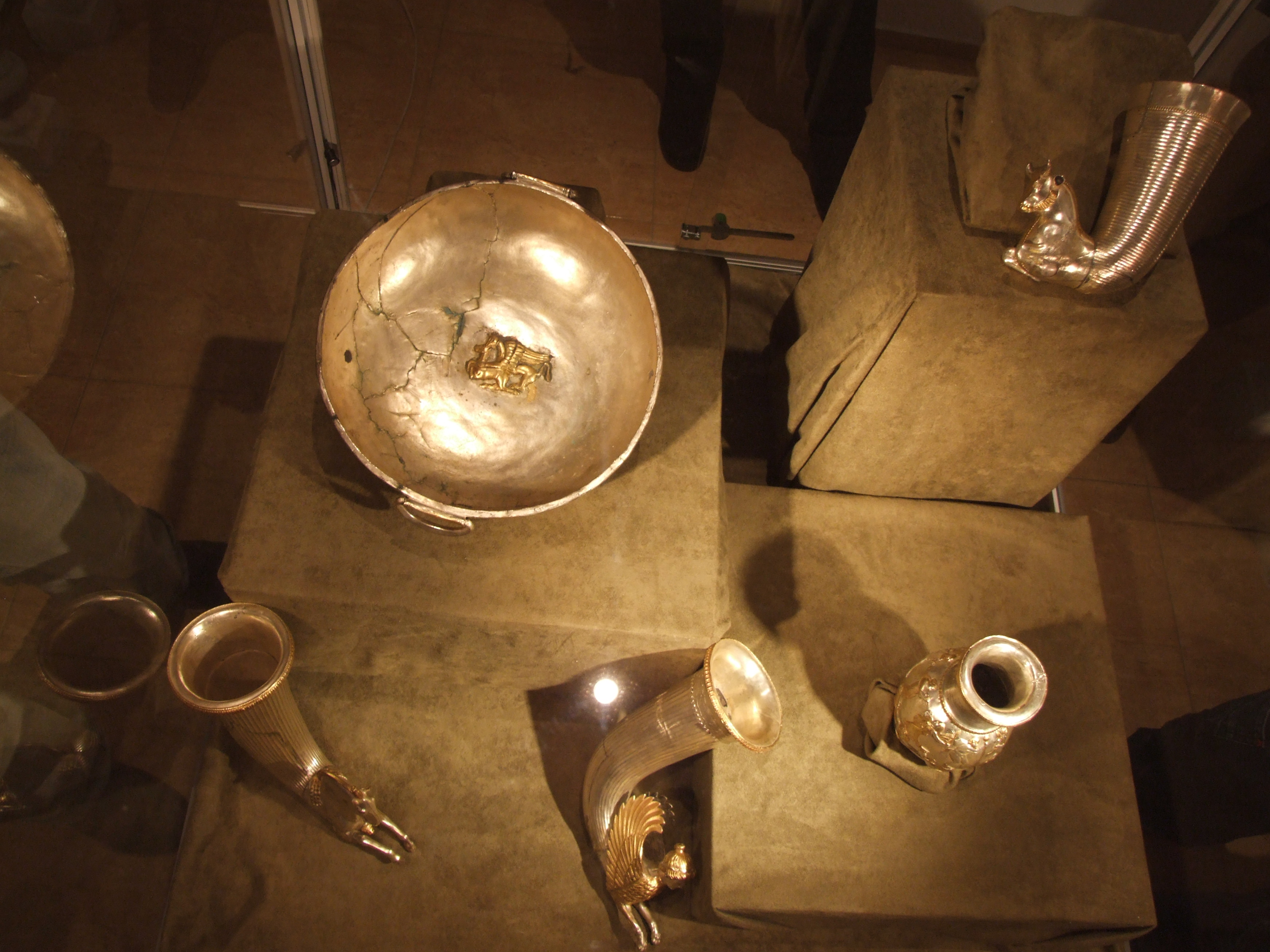

== See also ==
- Persian-Sassanid art patterns
- Thraco-Cimmerian
- Treasure of Nagyszentmiklós
- Zoomorphic style

Other Thracian treasures:

- Panagyurishte Treasure
- Rogozen Treasure
- Valchitran Treasure
- Lukovit Treasure
