= Phiela =

Coastal town of ancient Bithynia

Coordinates: 41°05′29″N 29°04′03″E

Phiela or Phiale was a coastal town of ancient Bithynia located on the Bosphorus.

Its site is located near Körfez in Asiatic Turkey.
