= Rogozen Treasure =

Thracian hoard

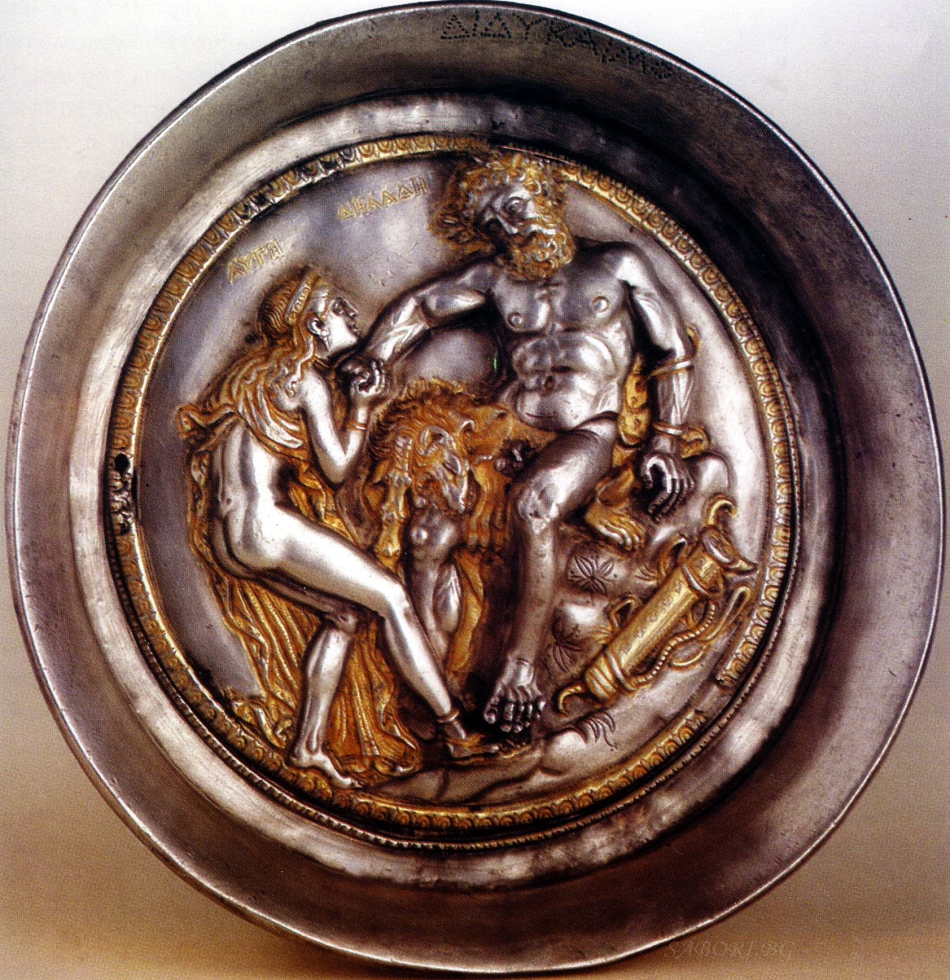
- A silver phiale with gold decoration depicting Auge and Heracles.
- Material: silver
- Created: 400 B.C. - 300 B.C.
- Discovered: 1985 at Rogozen
- Present location: Vratsa Regional Historical Museum; National Historical Museum, Sofia

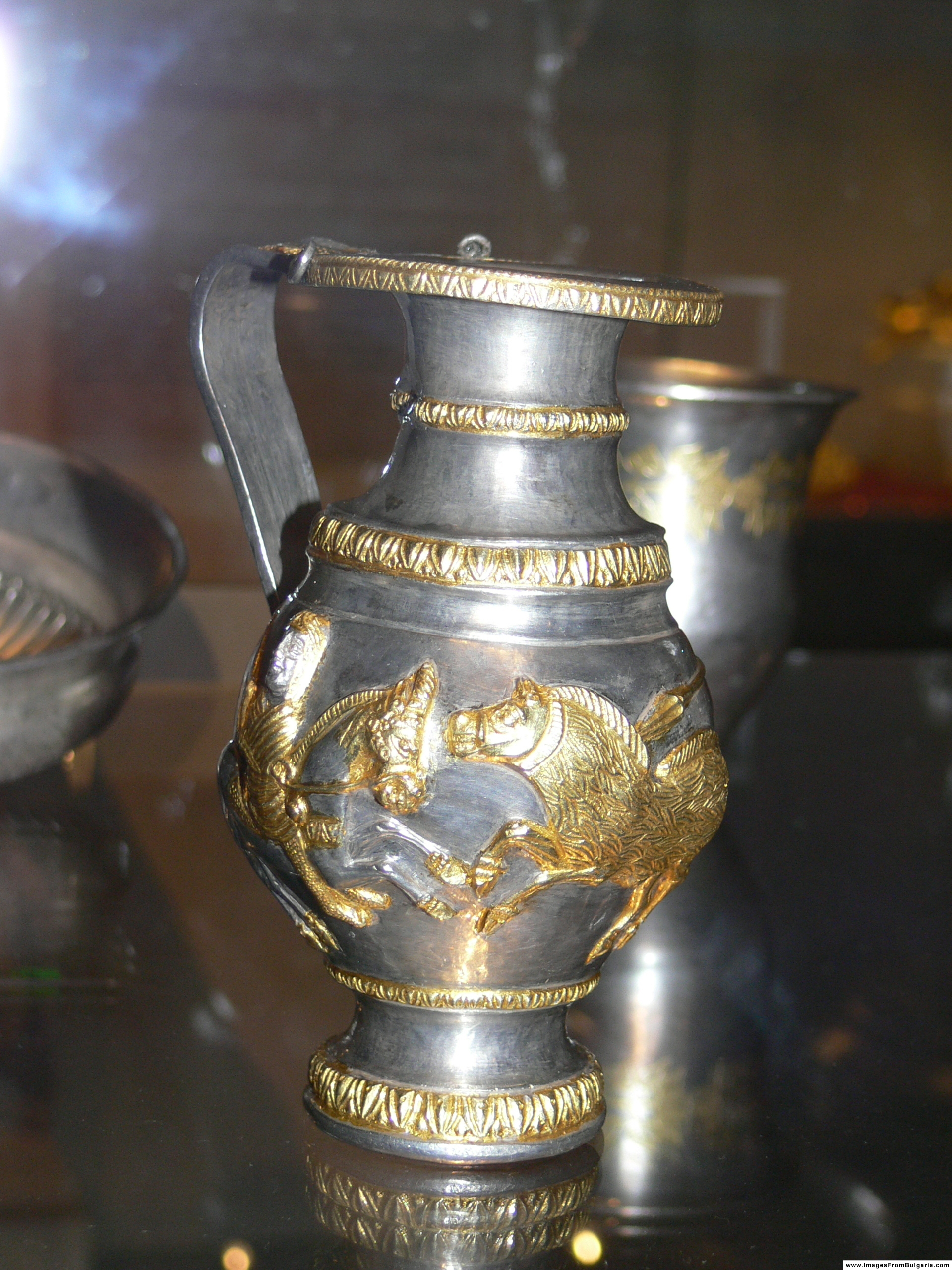
A goblet of the Rogozen treasure.

The Rogozen Treasure (Bulgarian: Рогозенско съкровище), called the find of the century, is a Thracian treasure.

== Discovery ==
It was discovered by chance in the autumn of 1985 by tractor driver Ivan Dimitrov, digging a hole for an irrigation system in his garden in the Bulgarian village of Rogozen. On January 6, 1986, an archaeological team, consisting of Bogdan Nikolov, Spas Mashov and Plamen Ivanov from the County Historical Museum(Regional Historical Museum) in Vratsa discovered a second half, consisting of 100 silver and gilded silver vessels.

== Description ==
It consists of 165 receptacles, including 108 phiales, 55 jugs and 3 goblets. The objects are silver with golden gilt on some of them with total weight of more than 20 kilograms (44 lb). The treasure is an invaluable source of information for the life of the Thracians, due to the variety of motifs in the richly decorated objects. It is dated back to the 5th–4th centuries B.C.

== Gallery ==
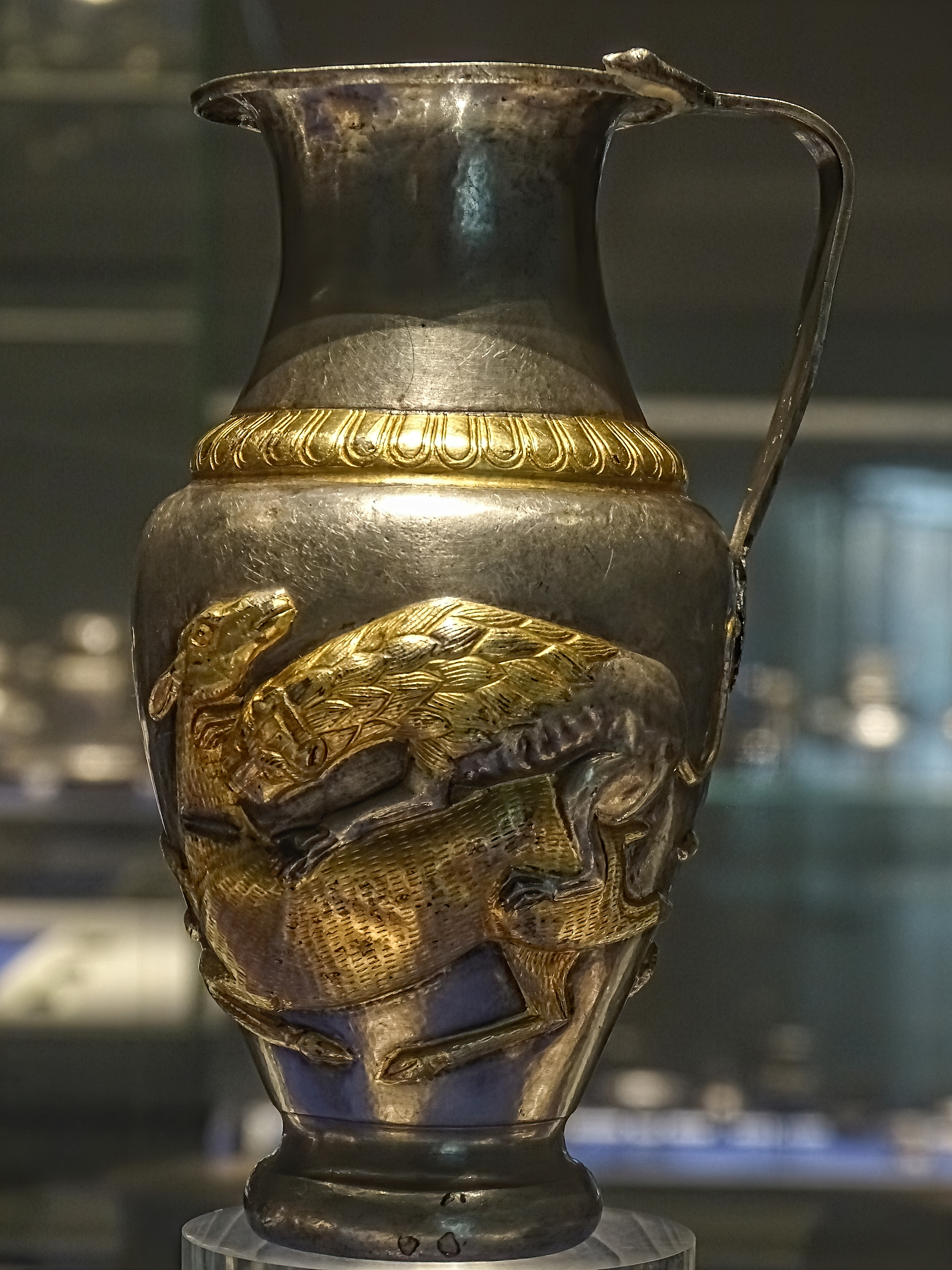
Thracian gilt silver pitcher depicting lion attacking a deer Rogozen Treasure Vratsa Bulgaria

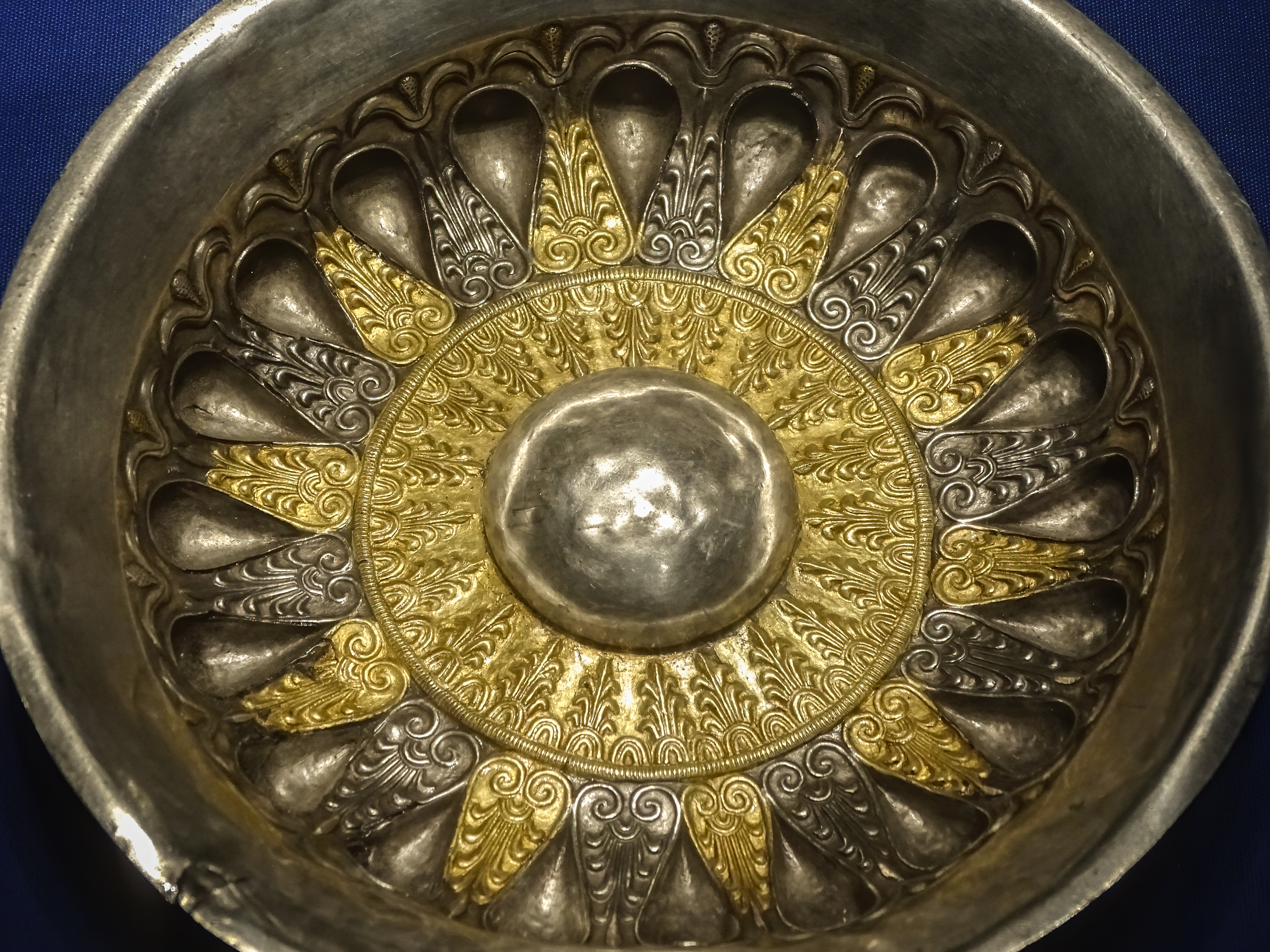
Thracian gilt silver omphalos bowl Rogozen Treasure Vratsa Bulgaria

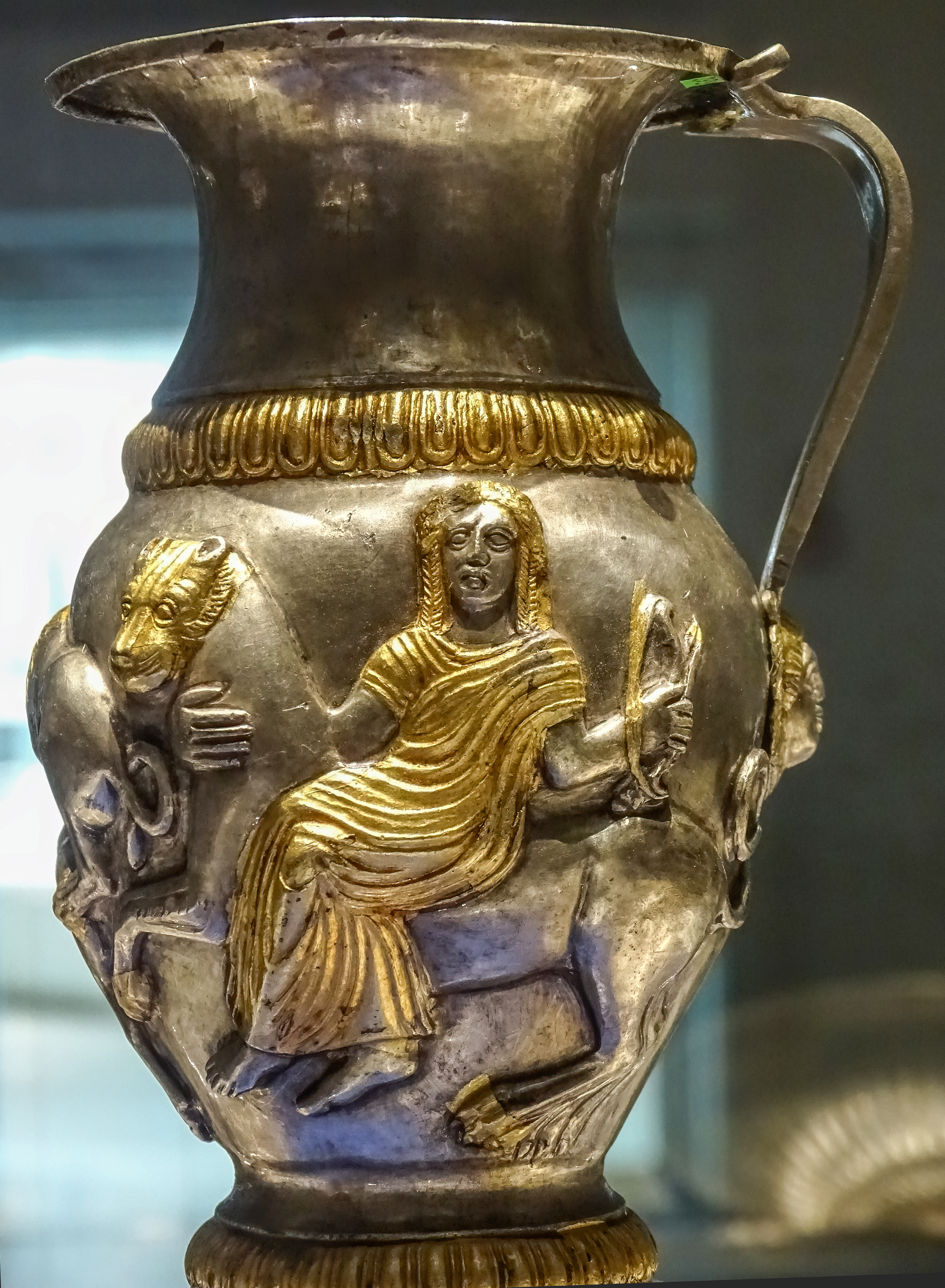
Thracian gilt silver pitcher Rogozen Treasure Vratsa Bulgaria

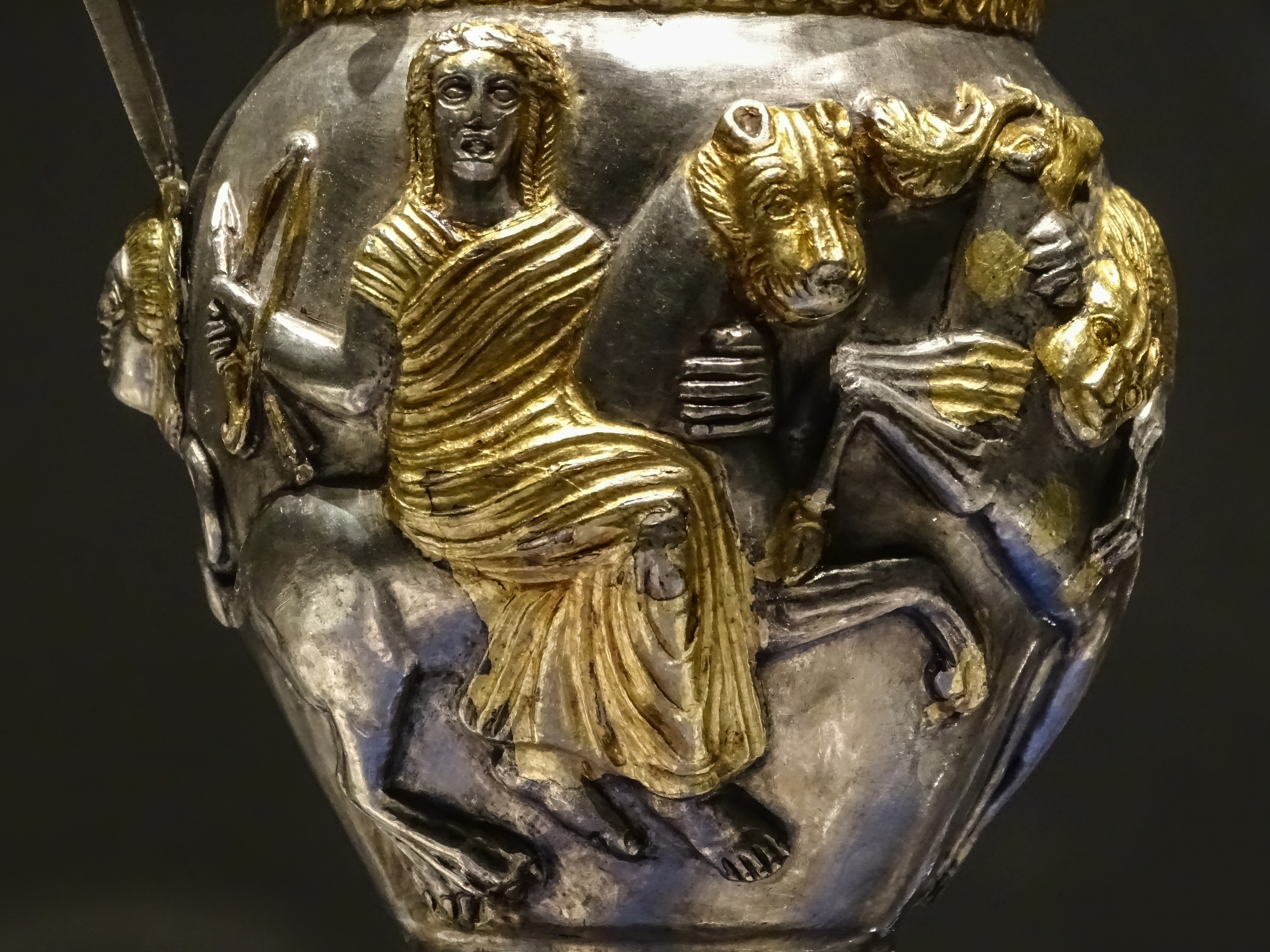
Thracian gilt silver pitcher Rogozen Treasure Vratsa Bulgaria

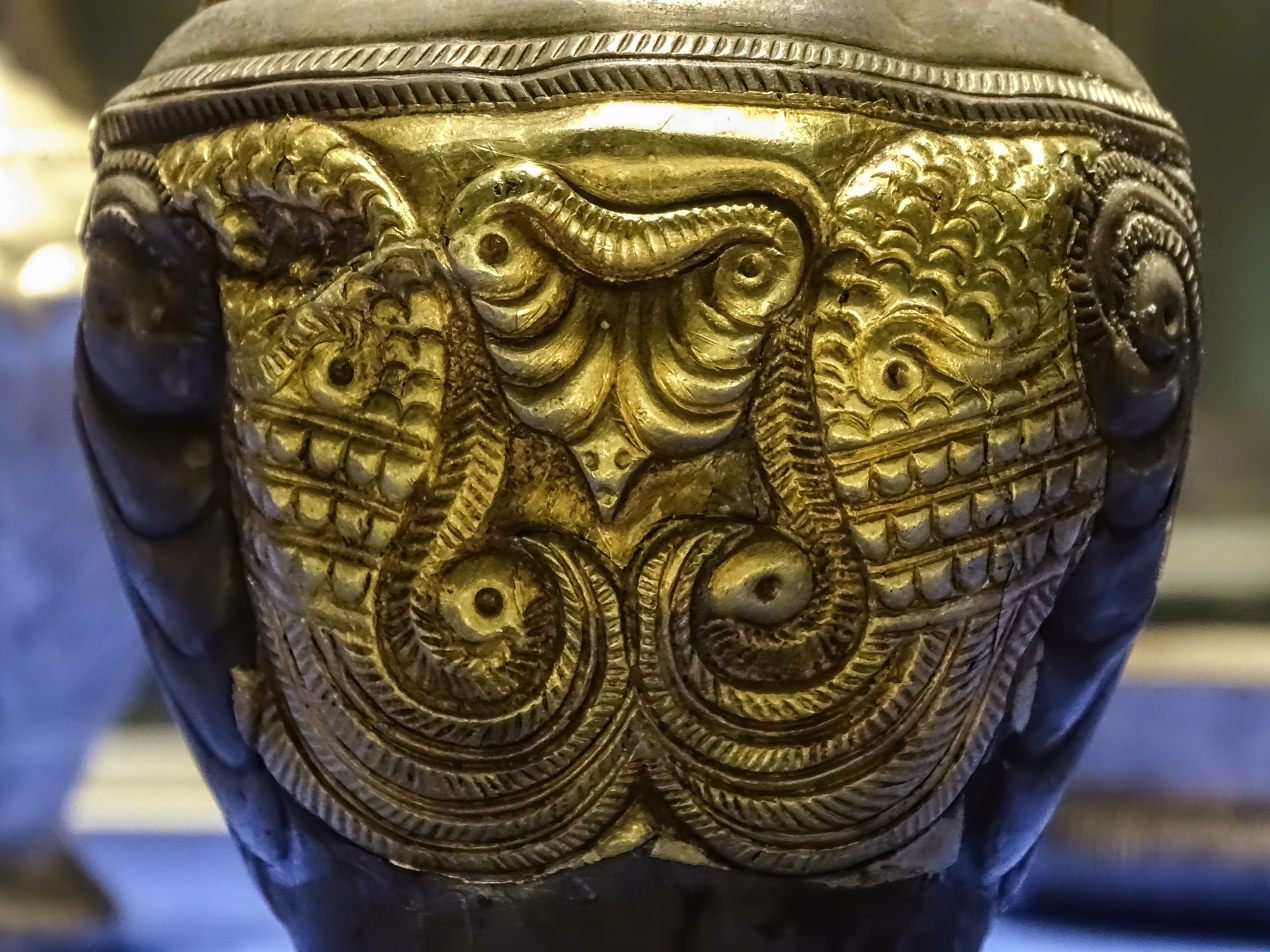
Thracian Gilt silver vessel Rogozen Treasure Vratsa Bulgaria

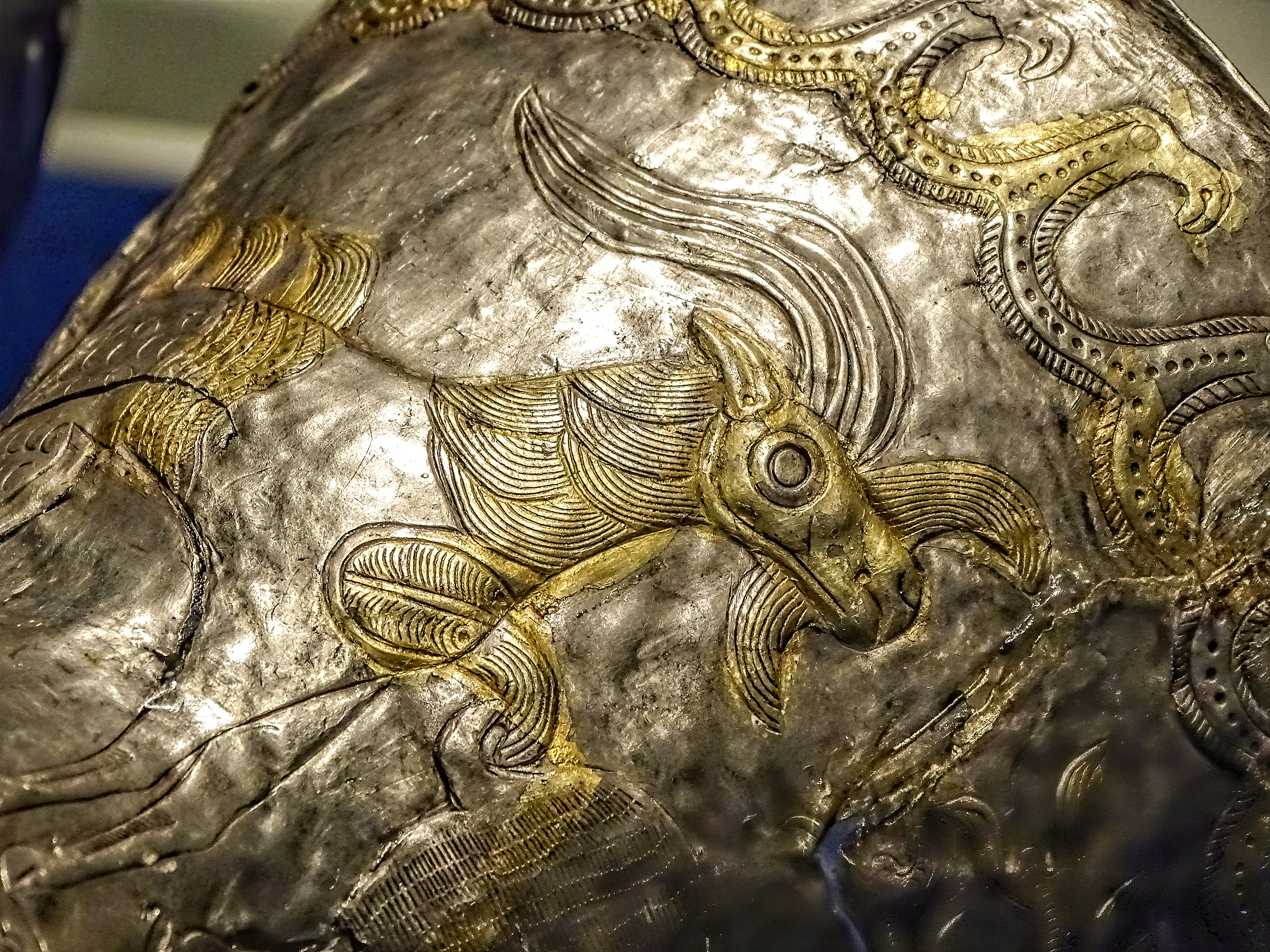
Thracian Gilt Silver vessel 5th–4th centuries BCE Rogozen Treasure Vratsa Bulgaria

== Honour ==
Rogozen Island off Robert Island, South Shetland Islands is named after the settlement of Rogozen in connection with the Rogozen Treasure.

== See also ==
- Panagyurishte Treasure
- Valchitran Treasure
- Lukovit Treasure
- Borovo Treasure

== Sources ==
- Fol, A.; Nikolov, B.; Hoddinott, R.F. (1986). The New Thracian Treasure from Rogozen (British Museum Exhibition Catalogue). London: British Museum Publications Limited.
- Cook, B.F., ed. (1989), The Rogozen Treasure: Papers of the Anglo-Bulgarian Conference, 12 March 1987, London: British Museum
- Zazoff, Peter (1987), "Der neue thrakische Silberschatz von Rogozen in Bulgarien", Antike Welt, 18 (4): 2–28, JSTOR 44432267
- Marazov, Ivan (1989), The Rogozen Treasure, translated by Chakalova, Nedyalka, Sofia: Svyat Publishers
- Borza, Eugene N. (October 1990), "Book Review: The Rogozen Treasure; Papers of the Anglo-Bulgarian Conference, 12 March 1987, edited by B.F. Cook; Pp. 111, pls. 16, British Museum Publication, 1989", American Journal of Archaeology, 94 (4): 695–696, doi:10.2307/505140, JSTOR 505140
- Rotroff, Susan I. (July–August 1998), "Thracian Glitter: A dazzling display of ancient art", Archaeology, 51 (4): 64–67 – via Archaeology Archive
- Eisenberg, Jerome M. (January 1998), "The Wealth of the Thracians: A Spectacular Exhibitions of Thracian Treasures Travelling America" (PDF), The International Review of Ancient Art & Archaeology - MINERVA, 9 (1): 14–15
- Bahn, Paul G. (1999). The World's Great Archaeological Treasures. Barnes & Noble. pp. 164–165.
- Taylor, Timothy (April 2000). "Book Review: The Rogozen Treasure, by Ivan Marazov, Pp. 327, b&w figs. 314, color figs. 49, maps 1, Secor Publishers, Sofia, 1996, ISBN 954-8250-05-5 (cloth)". American Journal of Archaeology. 104 (2): 398–399. doi:10.2307/507480. JSTOR 507480.
- Zournatzi, Antigoni (October 2000). "Inscribed Silver Vessels of the Odrysian Kings: Gifts, Tribute and the Diffusion of the Forms of "Achaemenid" Metalware in Thrace". American Journal of Archaeology. 104 (4): 685, 687, 688, 689, 690, 702, 703, 704, 705, 706. doi:10.2307/507153. JSTOR 507153.
