= Ivan Venedikov =

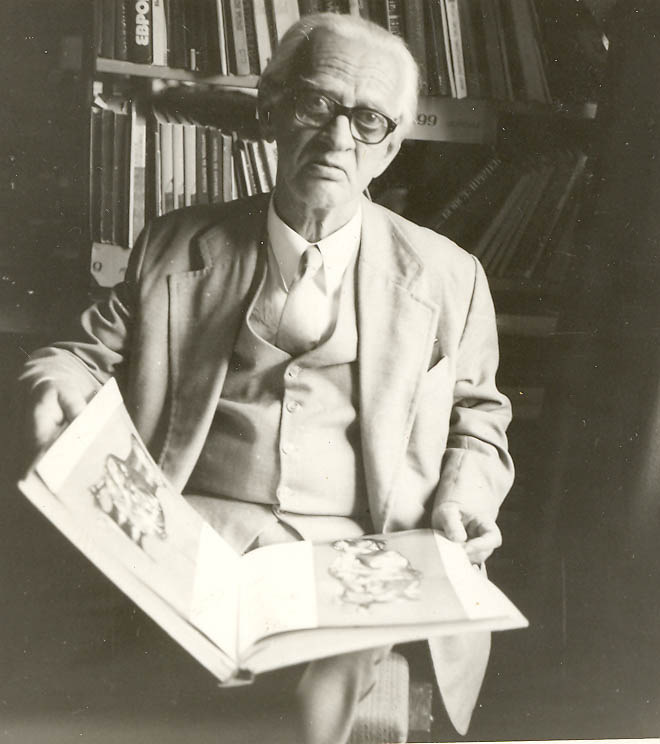
- Born: 10 January 1916; Sofia, Bulgaria
- Died: 19 August 1997 (aged 81); Sofia, Bulgaria
- Occupation(s): Archaeologist, Tracologist

Ivan Yordanov Venedikov (Bulgarian: Иван Йорданов Венедиков) (January 10, 1916 – August 10, 1997) was a Bulgarian archaeologist, historian, thracologist and philologist who studied Thracian and medieval history, archaeology, art and culture; Bulgarian cultural and artistic heritage.

Ivan Venedikov was born in Sofia on 10 January 1916. Between 1934 and 1939 he studied classical psychology in the Sofia University. Among his lectors were Aleksandar Balabanov, Dimitar Dechev, Gavril Katsarov, Veselin Beshevliev, Bogdan Filov, Petar Mutafchiev. His first work was Phonetics of the Latin Inscriptions from the Bulgarian Lands, published in 1942. Between 1941 and 1944 he worked in the Museum in Skopje and made his first excavations discovering the large antique and medieval town Bargala and the medieval Kozyak. Venedikov worked in the Department of Antiquity in the National Archaeological Museum between 1945 and 1973 and later worked in the Department of Antique Archaeology in the National Historical Museum. In 1981 he became a professor. He was also a lecturer on Thracian history in the Sofia University.

Venedikov had more than 150 publications on Thracian history, culture, art and language based on many studied archaeological sites and monuments. He made a periodization of the Thracian art; researched and restored the outlook of the Thracian chariots. In 1972, he organized an exhibition of Thracian art which included the finest objects from all over Bulgaria which travelled in many cities around the world. He also studied the old Bulgar inscriptions and concluded that the Bulgar language was still spoken in the beginning of the 9th century. Venedikov also proved that Preslav, which would become capital of the Bulgarian Empire in 893, already existed as a significant settlement in the beginning of the 9th century. In 1979 he made monography on the military and administrative organization of the Bulgarian Empire and made research on many titles and offices of the Bulgarian rulers and nobility.

== Bibliography ==
- (in Bulgarian) Земите по средния Вардар. Принос към античната география на Македония. Скопие, 1943.
- (in Bulgarian) Тракийската колесница. София, 1960.
- (in Bulgarian) Тайната на тракийските могили. София, 1968.
- (in Bulgarian) Тракийското изкуство. С Тодор Герасимов. София, 1973.
- (in Bulgarian) Съкровището от Летница. София, 1974.
- (in Bulgarian) Медното гумно на прабългарите. София, 1983.
- (in Bulgarian) Златният стожер на прабългарите. София, 1987.
- (in Bulgarian) Панагюрското златно съкровище. София, 1987.
- (in Bulgarian) Раждането на боговете. София, 1992.
- (in Bulgarian) Познайте ги по делата им. Българската интелигенция в моите спомени. I. София, 1993.
- (in Bulgarian) Прабългарите и християнството. Стара Загора, 1995.
- (in Bulgarian) Тракийското съкровище от Летница. София, 1996.

== Literature ==
- (in Bulgarian) Иван Венедиков, Познайте ги по делата им. Българската интелигенция в моите спомени, София, 1993.
- (in Bulgarian) За библиографията – Thracia XIV. In honorem annorum ХХХ Instituti Studiorum Thracicorum, Serdicae MMII
