= Roger Moorey =

British archaeologist (1937–2004)

Peter Roger Stuart Moorey, FBA, FSA (30 May 1937 – 23 December 2004) was a British archaeologist, historian, and academic, specialising in Mesopotamia and the Ancient Near East. He was Keeper of Antiquities at the Ashmolean Museum of the University of Oxford and also served as Vicegerent of Wolfson College, Oxford.

== Early life ==
Moorey was born in Bush Hill Park, Enfield, Middlesex. He was educated at Mill Hill School, then an all-boys private boarding school. He studied modern history at Corpus Christi College, Oxford. Between school and university he did his National Service in the Intelligence Corps, learning Russian and serving in Cyprus from 1956 to 1958 (during the EOKA insurgency).

He received his DPhil from the University of Oxford in 1967, with a dissertation entitled An archaeological and historical investigation of the Luristan bronzes, supervised by Max Mallowan.

== Career ==
Peter Moorey's time in Cyprus (with its fine archaeological heritage) probably reinforced a childhood interest in ancient history and may well have prompted his interest in the post of Assistant Keeper of Antiquities at the Ashmolean Museum which became available at the time of his graduation in 1961. He was eventually appointed as Keeper of Antiquities, which post he remained in until his retirement in 2003, shortly before his death. He was appointed Acting Director of the Ashmolean Museum during 1997–98 for eight months and briefly at other periods.

Moorey's excavation interests and experiences were broad, excavating at Jerusalem under Kathleen Kenyon in 1963 and in Abu Salabikh in Iraq under Nicholas Postgate in the 1970s. In 1982, Moorey edited Ur of the Chaldees, a republication of Leonard Woolley's 1954 Excavations at Ur, adding new photographs and information, and deleting some references to the Book of Genesis.

Moorey was a Fellow of the British Academy and the Society of Antiquaries of London.

== Publications ==
- P.R.S. Moorey, Excavation in Palestine, Lutterworth Press, 1982. ISBN 0-7188-2432-6.
- P.R.S. Moorey, A Century of Biblical Archaeology, Lutterworth Press, 1991. ISBN 0-7188-2825-9.
- P.R.S. Moorey, Ancient Mesopotamian Materials and Industries: The Archaeological Evidence, Oxford: Clarendon Press, 1994. ISBN 0-19-814921-2.
- P.R.S. Moorey, Idols of the People: Miniature Images of Clay in the Ancient Near East, Oxford: Oxford University Press, 2003. ISBN 0-19-726280-5.
  - Review — Bryn Mawr Classical Review
- Leonard Woolley & P.R.S. Moorey. Ur 'of the Chaldees': A Revised and Updated Edition of Sir Leonard Woolley's Excavations at Ur. Cornell University Press, 1982. ISBN 0-8014-1518-7
- Ancient Near Eastern Terracottas in the Ashmolean Museum — online catalogue.

== Festschrift ==
Potts, Timothy, Roaf, Michael & Stein, Diana (eds), Culture through Objects: Ancient Near Eastern studies in honour of P.R.S. Moorey, Oxford: Griffith Institute, 2003. ISBN 0-900416-80-7.

=== Obituaries ===
- Roger Moorey, Obituary, The Times (22 January 2005)
- Roger Moorey, Obituary, The Guardian, obit by Ashley Jones (3 February 2005)
- Roger Moorey, 1937–2004, American Journal of Archaeology, obit by O. Muscarella (July 2005)
