= The Chicagoan =

Defunct American magazine

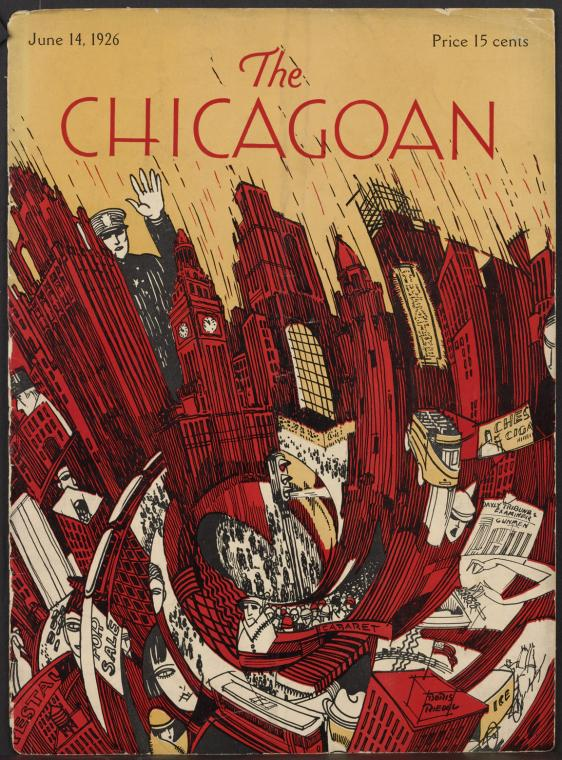
- Cover of Vol. 1, No. 1, dated June 14, 1926
- Categories: Politics, social issues, popular culture
- Frequency: Twice monthly from June 1926 until July 1931; Monthly from July 1931 until April 1935
- Publisher: Martin J. Quigley
- Paid circulation: Upwards of 20,000 at its peak
- First issue: June 14, 1926
- Final issue: April 1935
- Country: United States
- Based in: Chicago
- Language: English

The Chicagoan was an American magazine modeled after The New Yorker published from June 1926 until April 1935. Focusing on the cultural life of the city of Chicago, each issue of The Chicagoan contained art, music, and drama reviews, profiles of personalities and institutions, commentaries on the local scene, and editorials, along with cartoons and original art.

In an early issue, The Chicagoan's editors claimed to represent "a cultural, civilized and vibrant" city "which needs make no obeisance to Park Avenue, Mayfair, or the Champs Elysees." Despite its lofty aims, the stalwart assertions of publisher Martin J. Quigley (who once wrote that "Whatever Chicago was and was to be, The Chicagoan must be and become"), and a circulation that sometimes rose above 20,000, the magazine was largely forgotten after its last issue.

Only two substantial collections remain, one at the University of Chicago's Regenstein Library and the other at the New York Public Library. Cultural historian Neil Harris has written a book on the subject, The Chicagoan: A Lost Magazine of the Jazz Age (the University of Chicago Press).

== Resurrection ==
In October 1973, the magazine was relaunched by Jon and Abra Anderson of The Chicago Daily News. It was later sold and ceased publication with its October 1974 issue.

J. C. Gabel, former publisher of Stop Smiling, acquired the rights to the magazine and planned to launch the restored magazine in September, 2011 as a biannual publication with weekly Website updates. Jessa Crispin has signed on as a contributor and fiction editor. It launched in 2012. However, Gabel discontinued publishing it after just one, 194-page issue. Gabel told Crain's Chicago Business in 2015 that "We only did one issue of our incarnation of the Chicagoan, and after a very valiant effort, we couldn't raise the necessary capital to do it properly without it being run like a sweat shop."

Yet another resurrection of a magazine called The Chicagoan was proposed in 2015, by former U.S. Senate candidate Jack Ryan. However, before he began publishing the magazine, he changed its name to Chicagoly. That magazine published nine issues before discontinuing publication with the issue published in December 2017.
