= Thracian treasure =

Aspect of Thracian archaeology

The Odrysian kingdom in its maximum extent under Sitalces (431–424 BC).

The Thracians (Bulgarian: Траки, Ancient Greek: Θρᾷκες, Latin: Thraci) were a group of Indo-European tribes inhabiting a large area in Central and Southeastern Europe, centred in modern Bulgaria. They were bordered by the Scythians to the north, the Celts and the Illyrians to the west, the Greeks to the south, and the Black Sea to the east.

The Thracians were skillful craftsmen. They made beautifully ornate golden and silver objects such as various kinds of vessels, rhytons, facial masks, pectorals, jewelry, weapons, etc. These show strong, and increasing, influence from the neighbouring cultures, especially the Greeks. They used to bury rich hoards of precious objects both to hide them in times of enemy invasions and unrest as well as for ritual purposes. To date, more than 80 Thracian treasures have been excavated in Bulgaria, the cradle of the Thracian civilization. Refer to the map which explicitly shows the territory of present-day Bulgaria.

== Thracian treasure hoards ==
- Borovo Treasure
- Lukovit Treasure
- Panagyurishte Treasure
- Rogozen Treasure
- Valchitran Treasure

== Thracian treasures ==
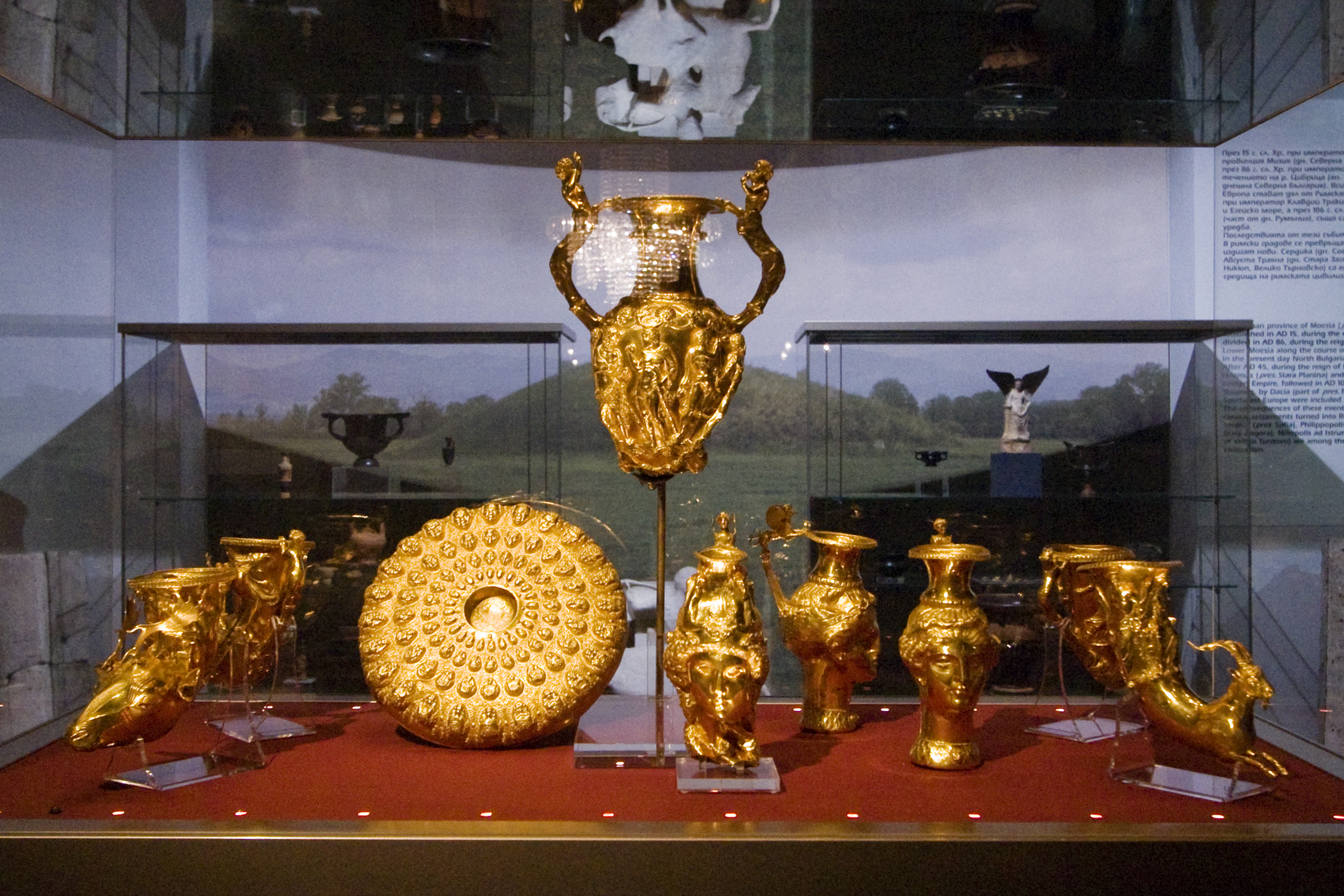
Panagyurishte Treasure

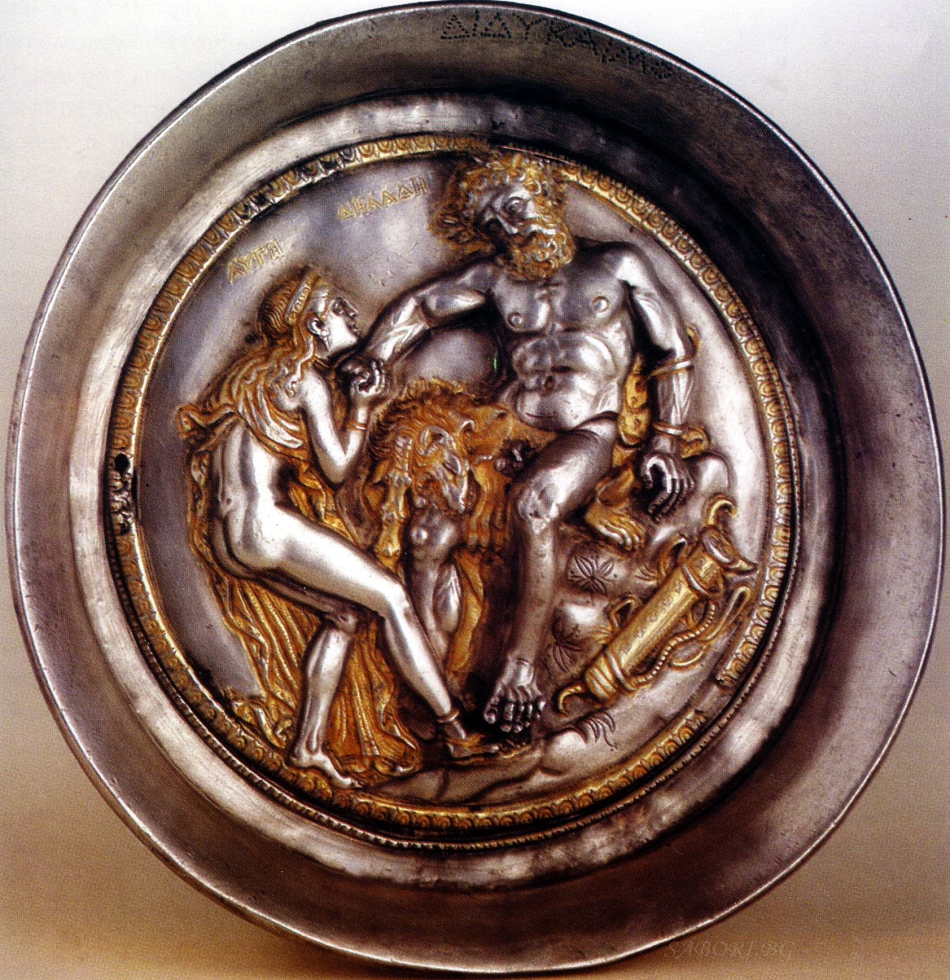
Rogozen Treasure

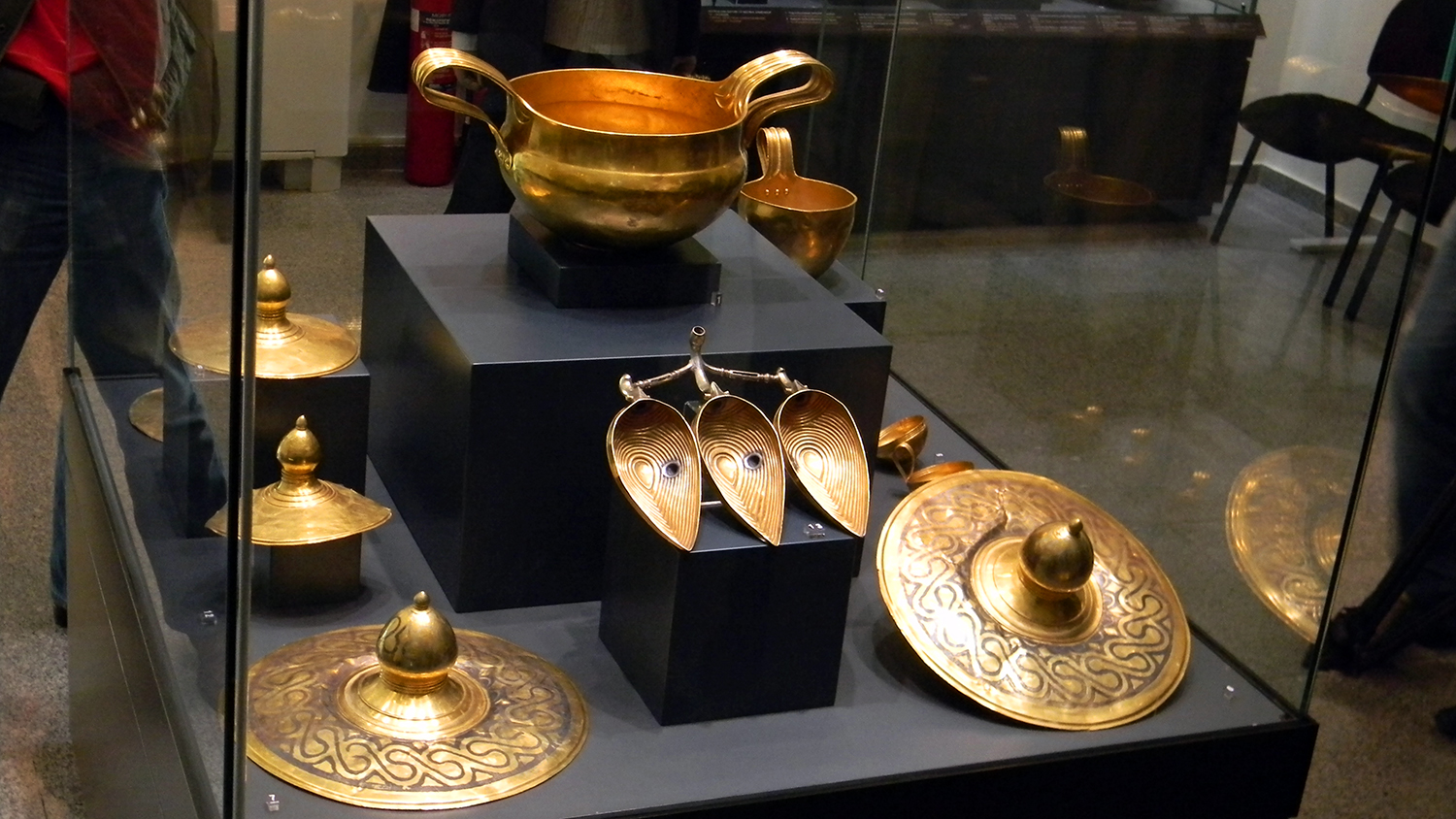
Valchitran Treasure

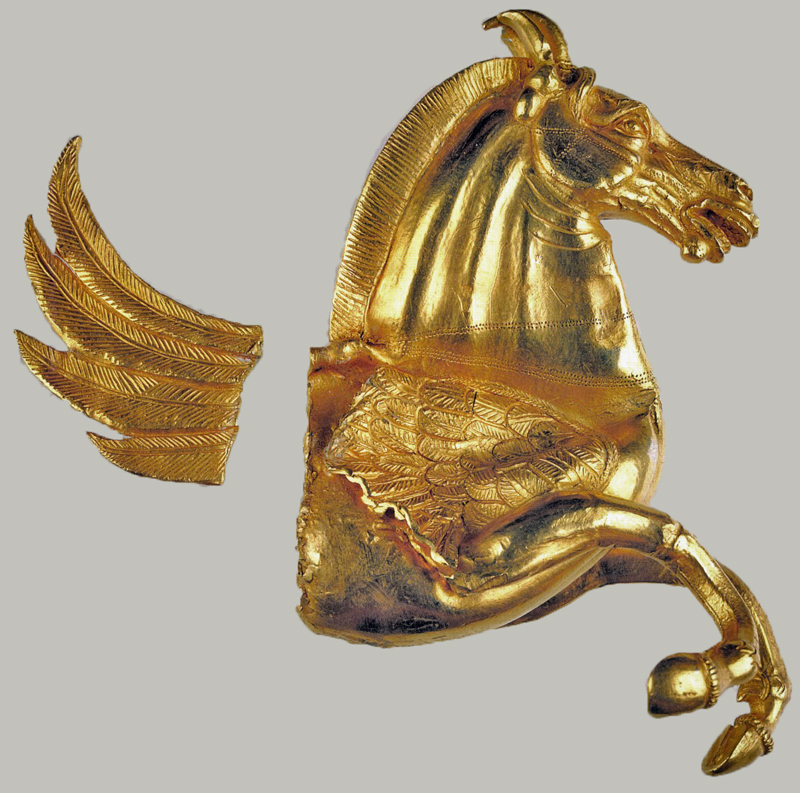
Vazovo Thracian Pegasus

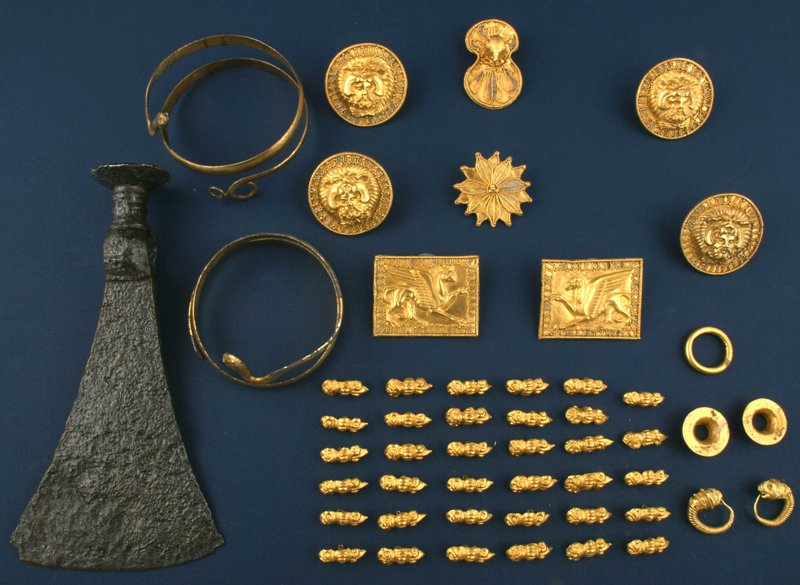
Kralevo Treasure

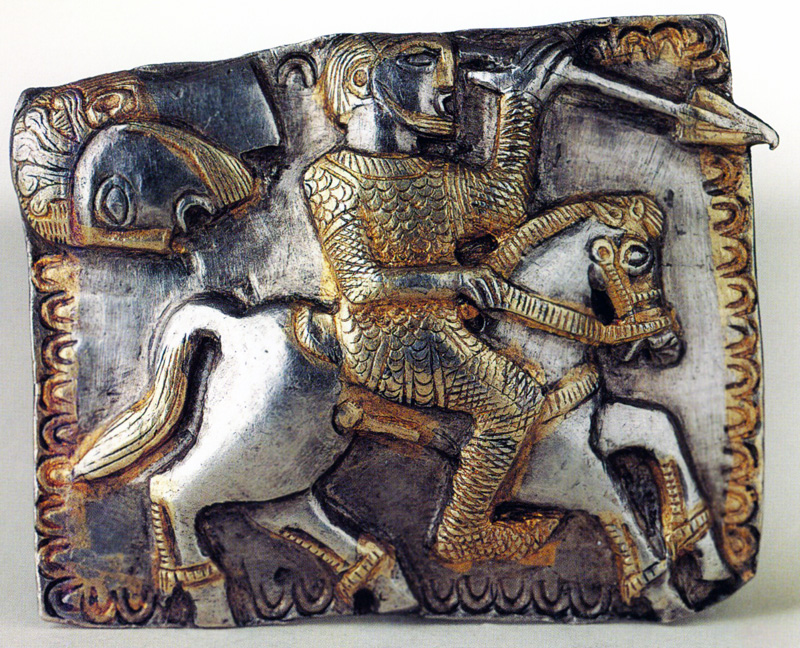
Letnitsa treasure

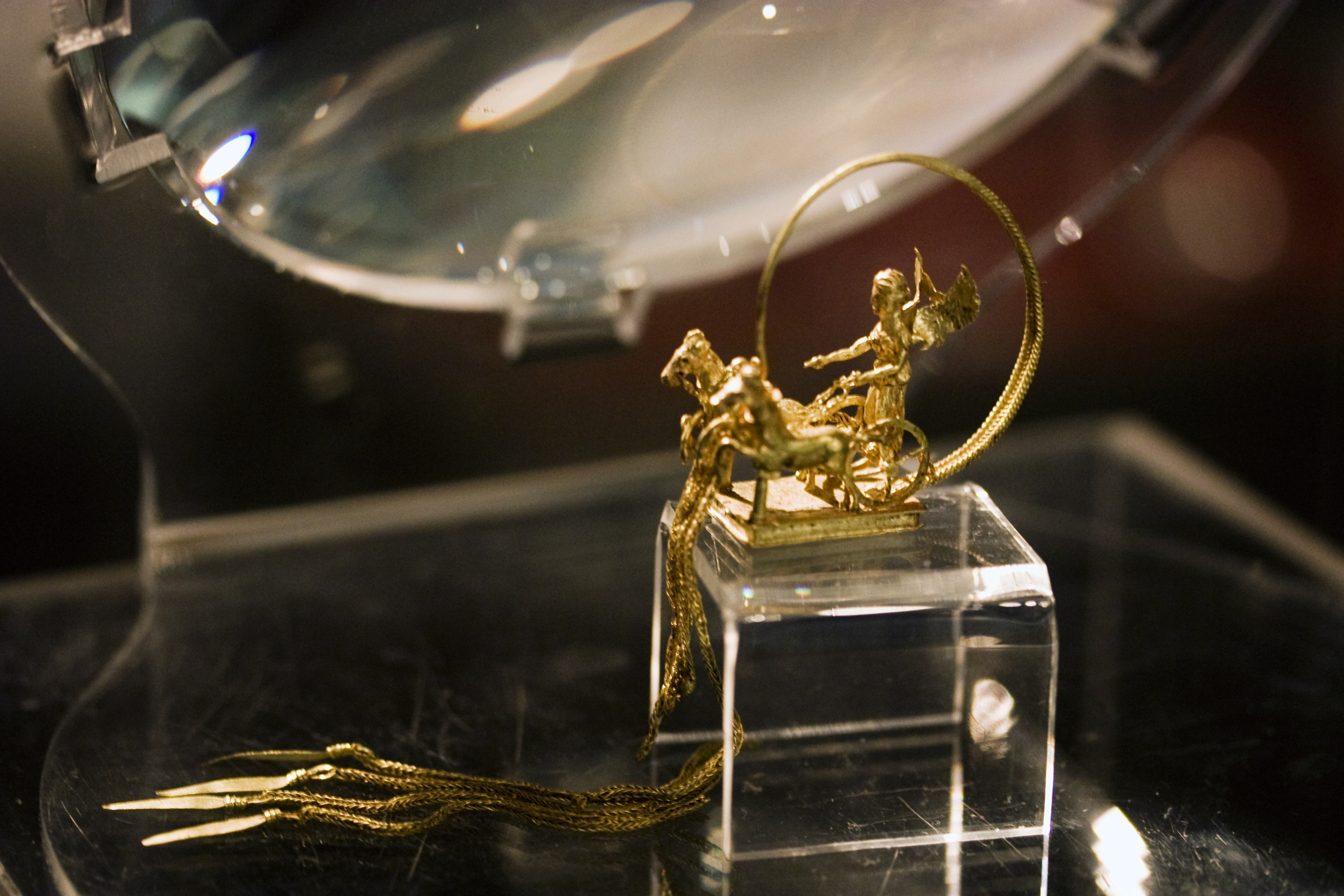
Sinemorets Gold figurines

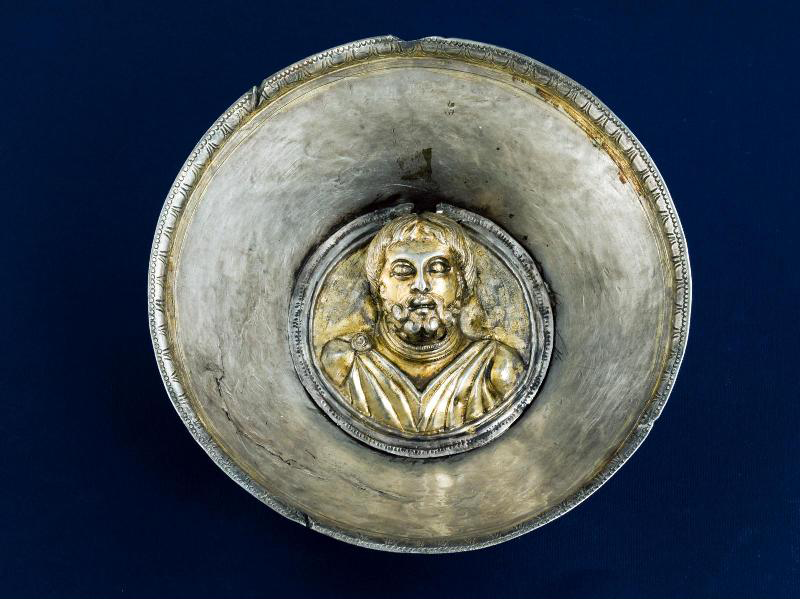
Yakimovo Thracian Treasure

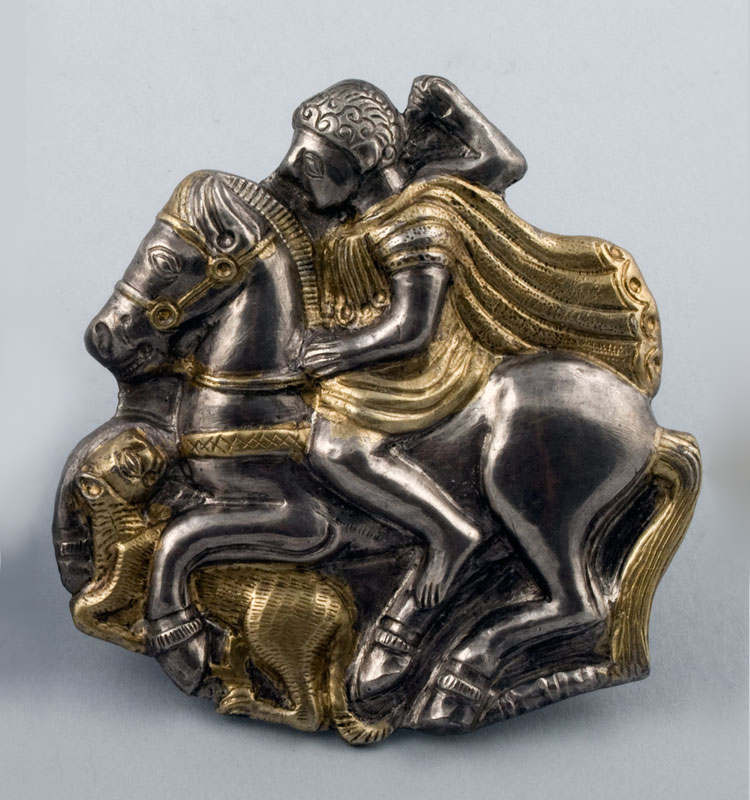
Lukovit Treasure

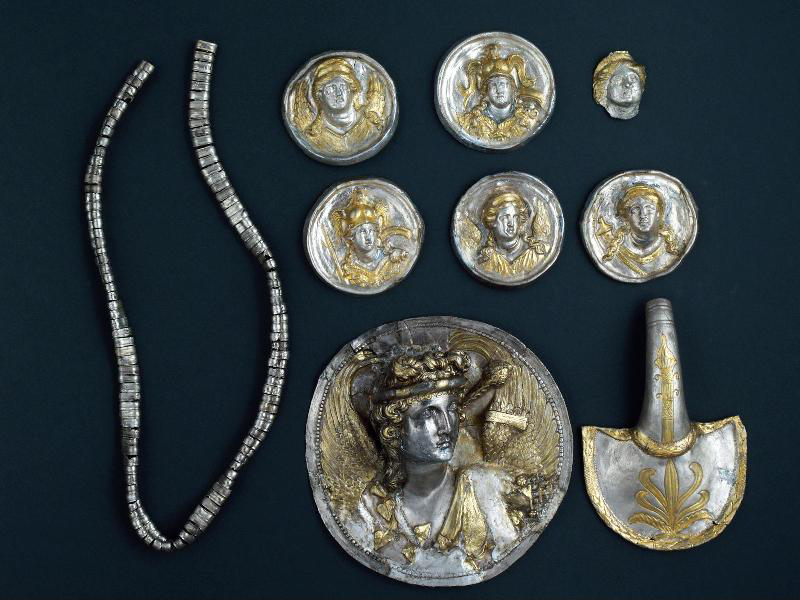
Ravnogor Thracian Treasure

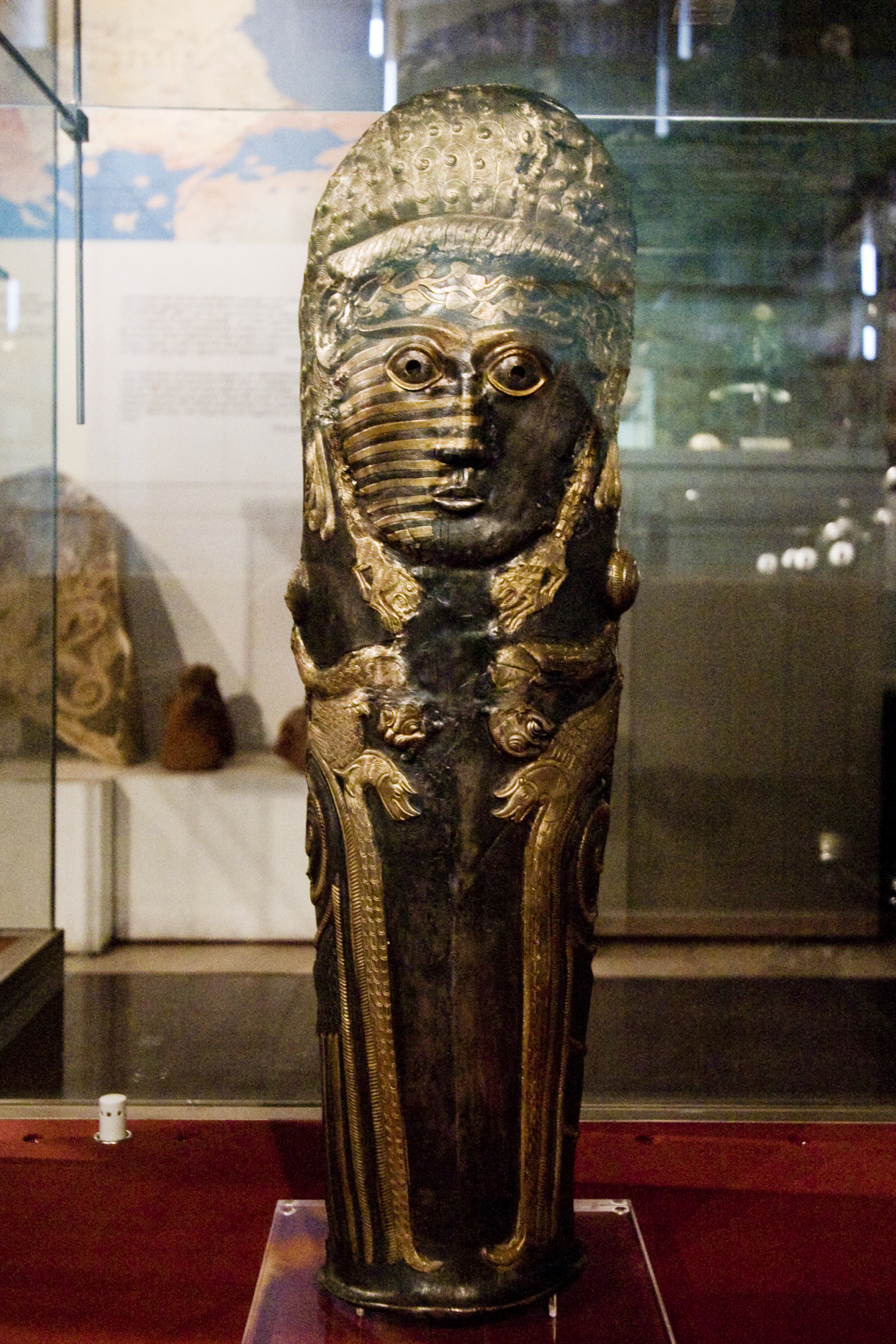
Mogilanska Mogila Funeral Offerings

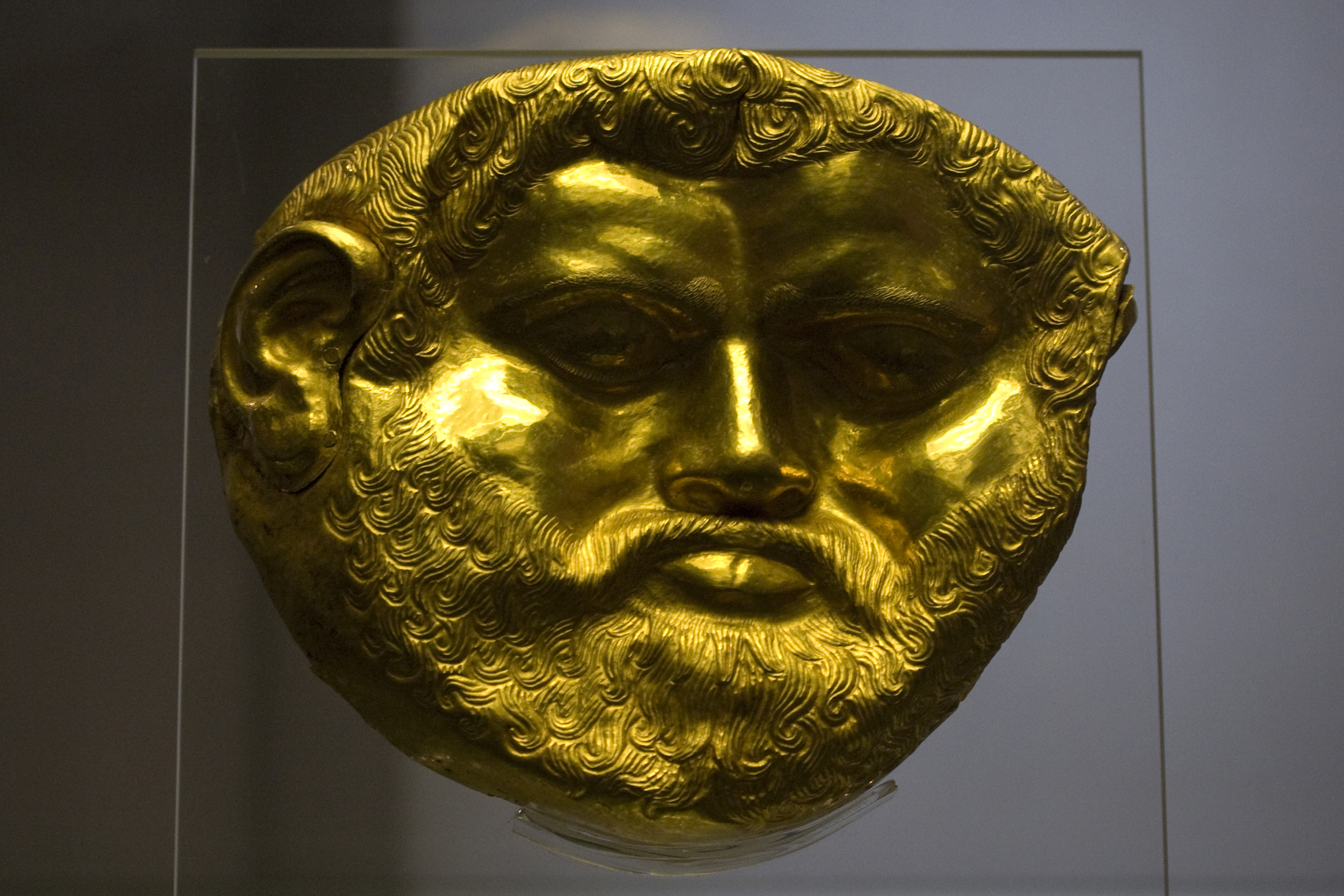
Golden mask of Teres I, the first ruler of the Odrysian kingdom

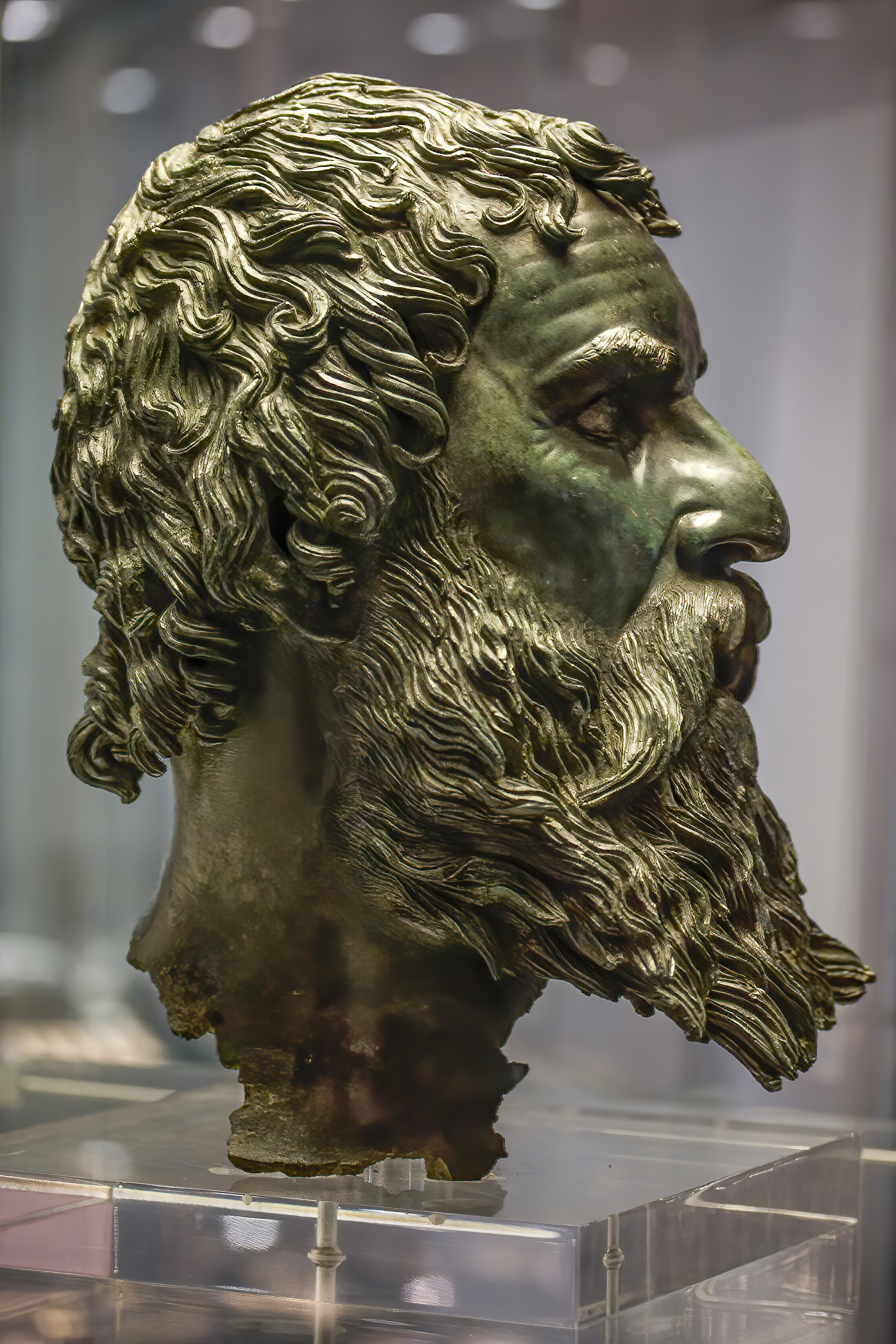
Bronze Head of Seuthes III found in Golyamata Kosmatka

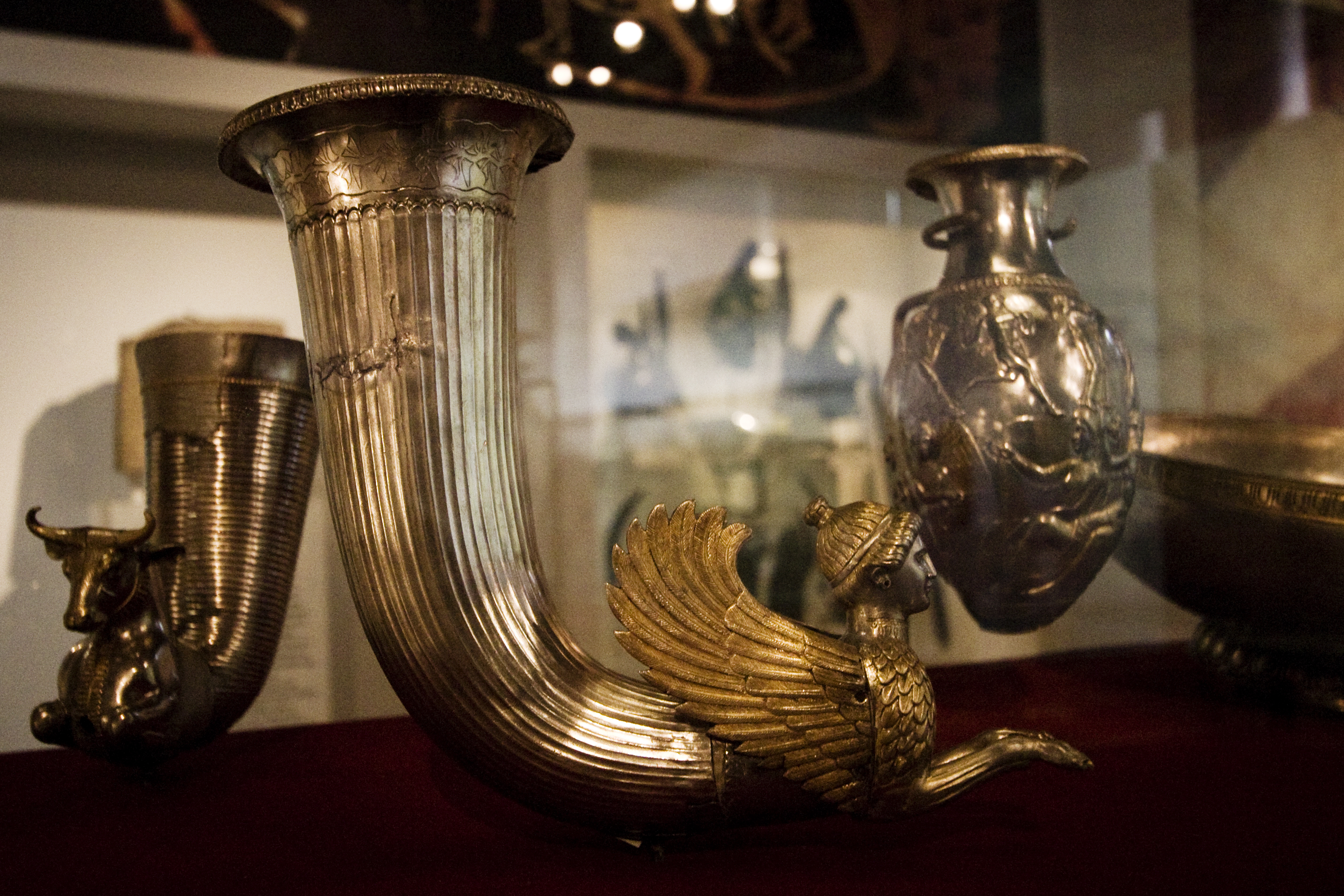
King Cotys I's Borovo Treasure

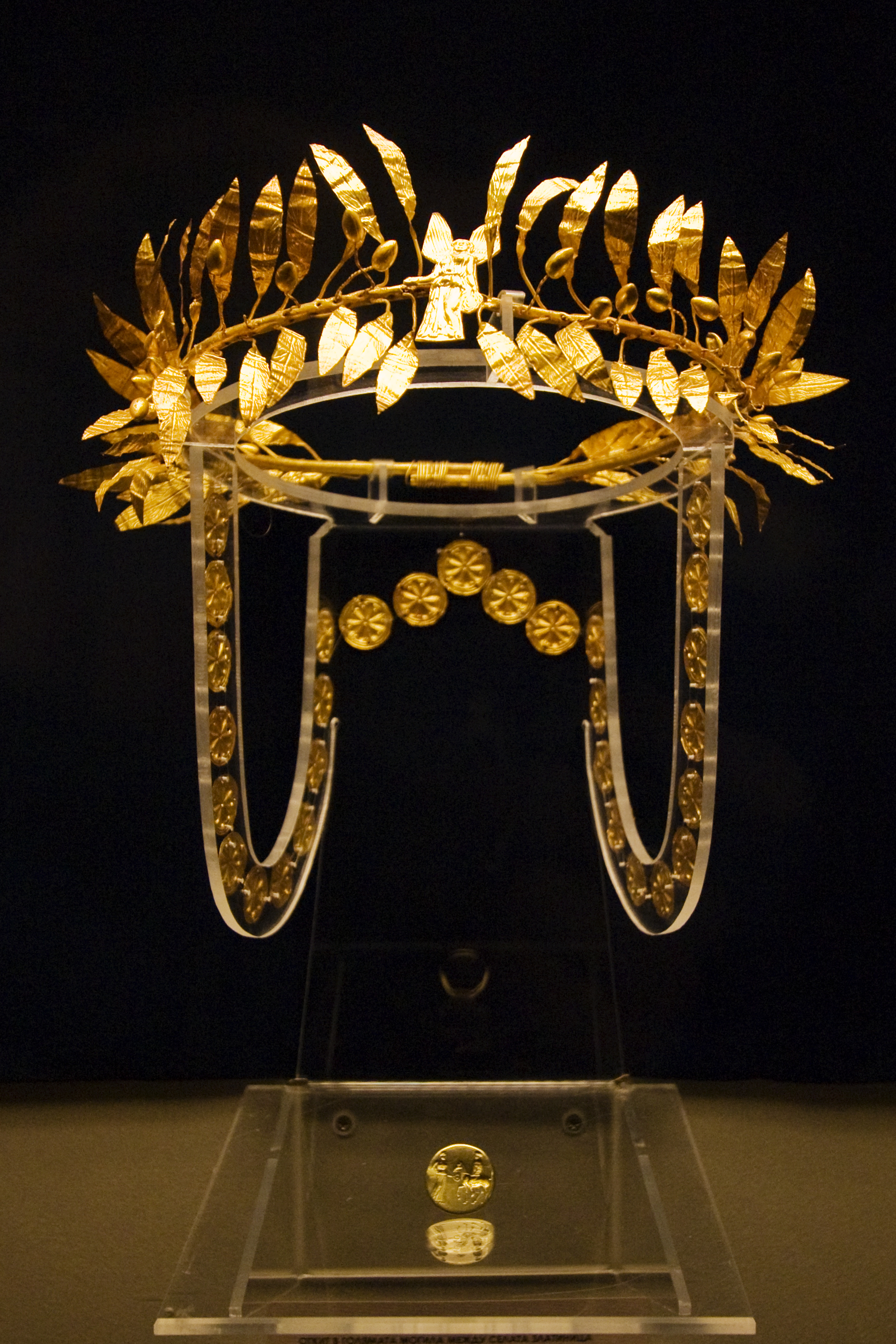
Odrysian Wreath of Cersobleptes, Zlatinica-Malomirovo

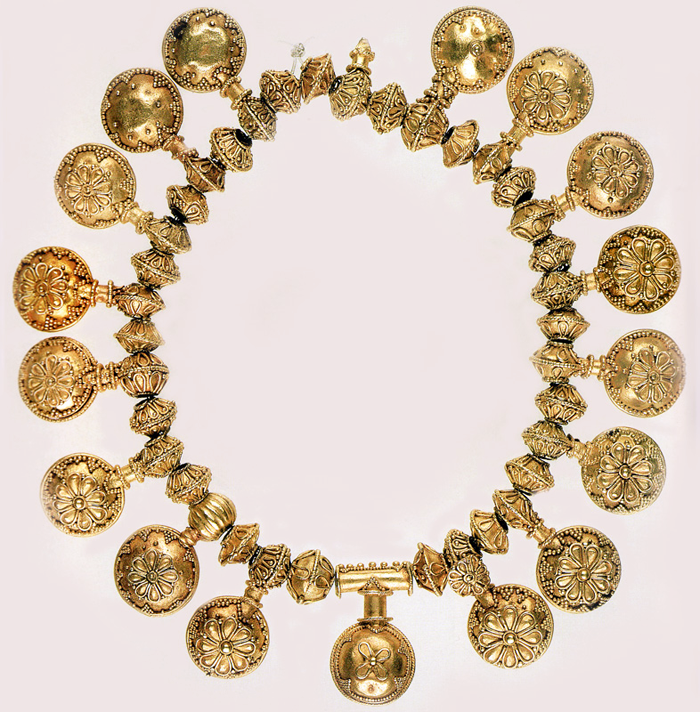
A thracian golden necklace found in Arabadjiiska Mogila

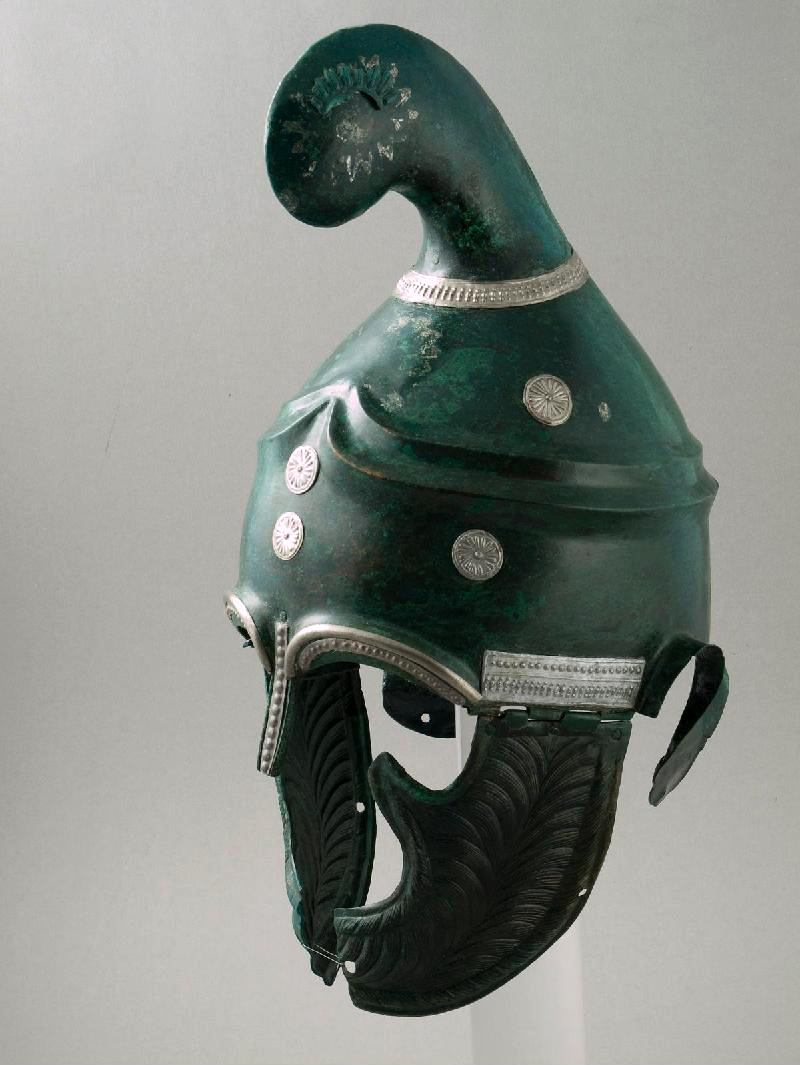
Thracian helmet found in Pletena

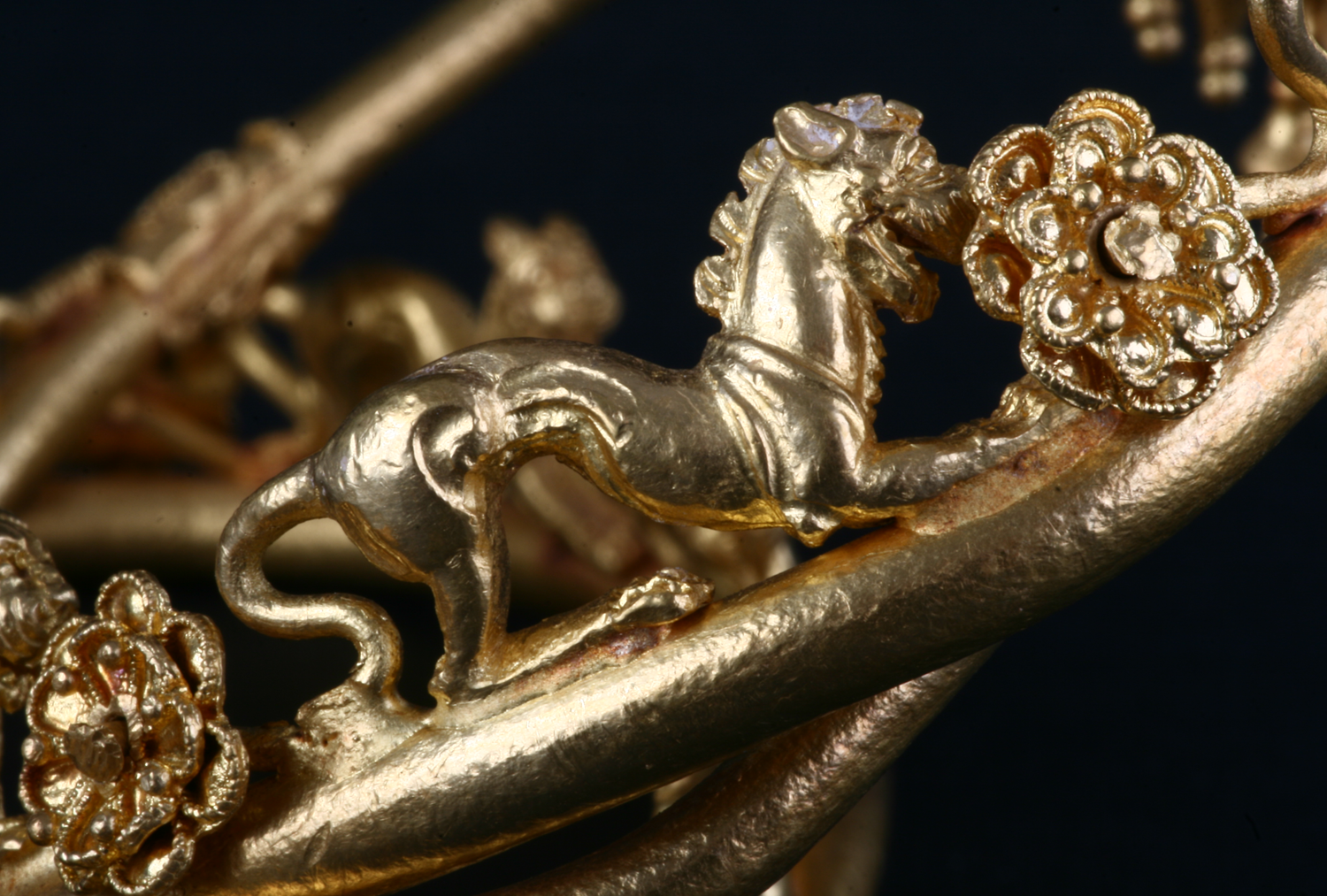
Golden treasure found at the Great Sveshtari Mound

== See also ==
- Dacian art
- Gold wreaths from Thrace
- Scythian art
- Thraco-Cimmerian
- Treasure of Nagyszentmiklós
- Zoomorphic style
