= Dacian art =

Art associated with the Dacians or North Thracians

Dacian art is the art associated with the peoples known as Dacians or North Thracians; The Dacians created an art style in which the influences of Scythians and the Greeks can be seen. They were highly skilled in gold and silver working and in pottery making. Pottery was white with red decorations in floral, geometric, and stylized animal motifs. Similar decorations were worked in metal, especially the figure of a horse, which was common on Dacian coins.

== Background ==
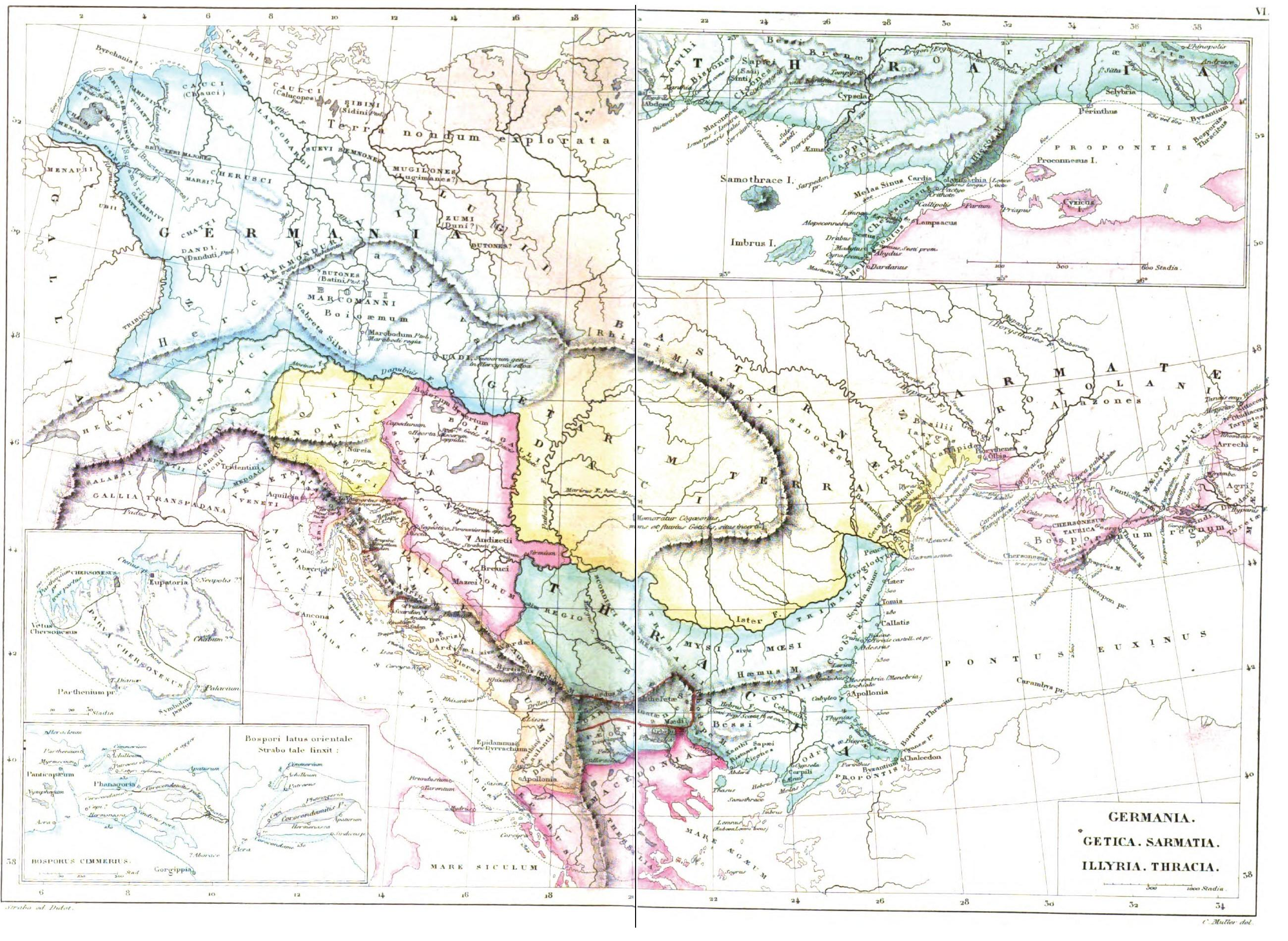
Dacians regions cf. Strabo (ca. 20 AD) by Muller (1877)

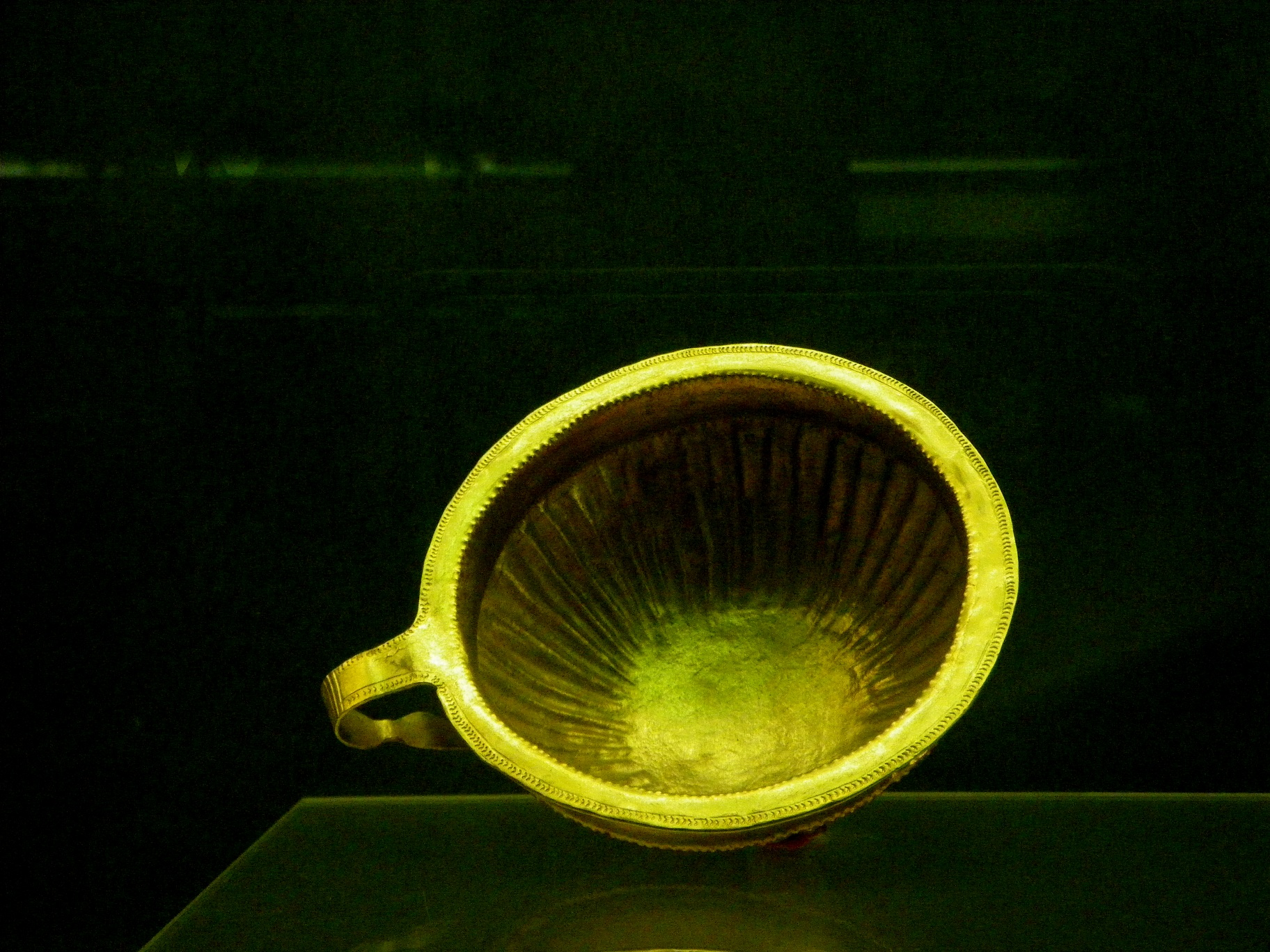
Dacian gold bowl found in Transylvania (Vienna Museum)

The Geto-Dacians lived in a very large territory, stretching from the Balkans to the northern Carpathians and from the Black Sea and the river Tyras to the Tisa plain, sometimes even to the Middle Danube. Between 15th-12th century, the Dacian-Getae culture was influenced by the Bronze Age Tumulus-Urnfield warriors.

Dacian civilization went through several stages of development, from the Thracian stage in the Bronze Age to the classical period of the Geto-Dacians (the first century BC to the first century AD). In the Bronze Age, proto-Thracian populations emerged from the fusion of the local Eneolithic (Chalcolithic) stock with the intruders of the transitional Indo-Europeanization Period. From these proto-Thracians, in the Iron Age, there were developed the Dacians of the Danubian-Carpathian Area on the one hand and the Thracians of the eastern Balkan Peninsula on the other.

== Pre-Dacian periods ==
North Thracian population was chiefly an Early Bronze Age mix of the descendants of intrusive stockbreeding people and of survivors of the autochthonous Chalcolithic culture that the newcomers had destroyed. In this ethnic synthesis which gave birth to the Thracian people, the former predominated but, especially in the more mountainous areas, vestiges of Chalcolithic traditions survived through the Early and into the Middle Bronze Age.

The local, Daco-Thracian art should not be mistaken for the art of the Thracians south of the Balkans although mutual influences had undoubtedly appeared.

Thracian art was typically geometric in its decoration, a taste which was a remnant of Late Bronze Age traditions. While the Thracian tribes adopted-no doubt from the Scythians-some aspects of mounted nomadism in the first millennium B.C., they also preserved many traditions of the European Bronze Age and belonged more to the world of European cultures than to that of the East.

== Classical Dacian periods ==
The 1st century BC silver work from the lower Danube region consists mostly of bracelets and fibulae alongside of a small number of decorative disks, plaques, and bowls. To distinguish it from earlier Thracian silver work, one might label this later silver work as Geto-Dacian or Geto-Thracian depending on whether is found above or below the lower Danube.

The design of Geto-Dacian helmets (i.e. Ciumesti, Iron Gate) is sufficiently unusual in ancient art to offer the opportunity to trace it to its origin, and, thereby, provide some insight into the Scythian elements that went into the formation of early Dacian art and the means by which ancient Oriental motifs survived and were transmitted into Europe Almost identical in decoration and details of craftsmanship are the two silver beakers, now in Bucharest and New York and unquestionably were made in the same metalsmith shop as the helmet.

== Gallery ==
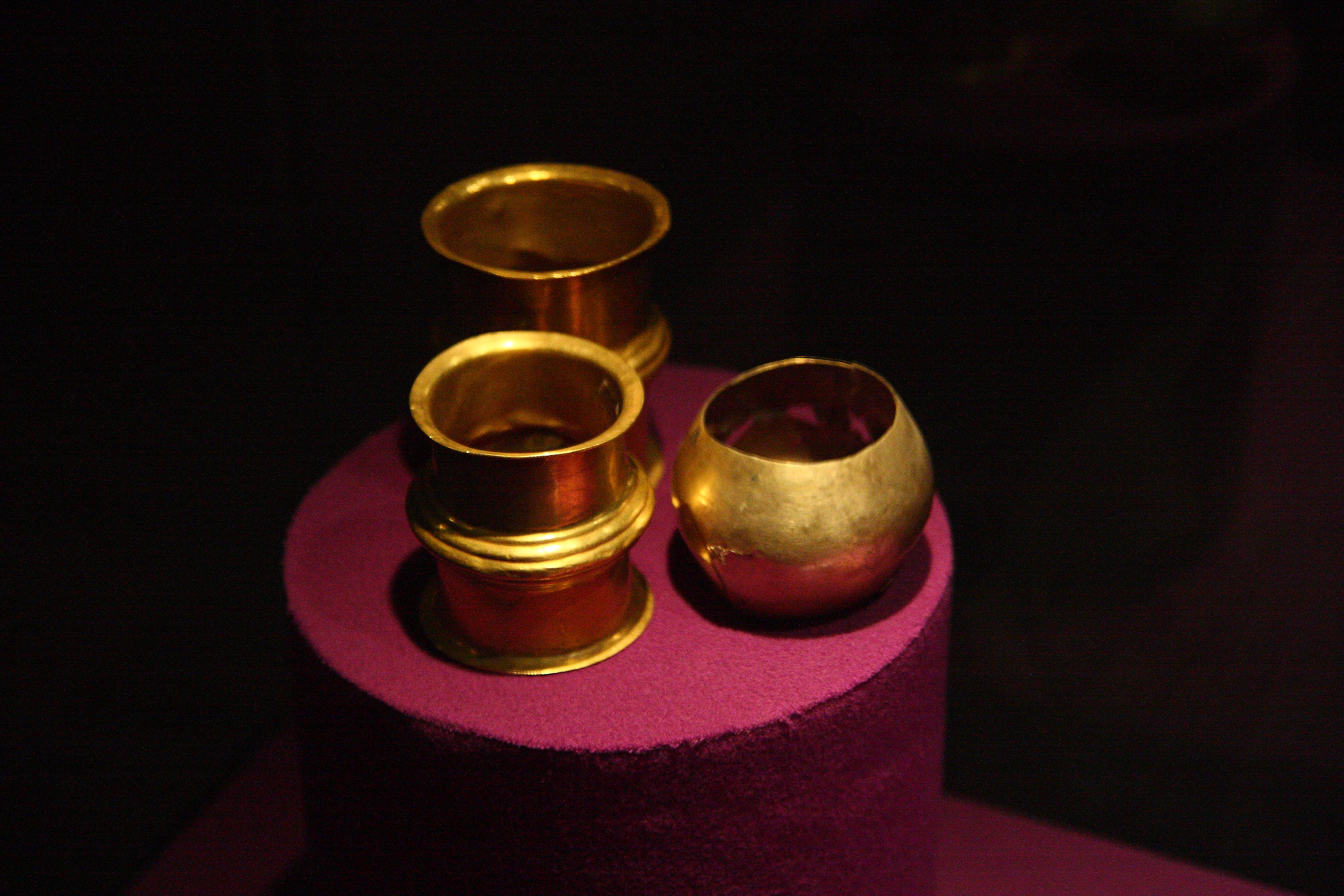

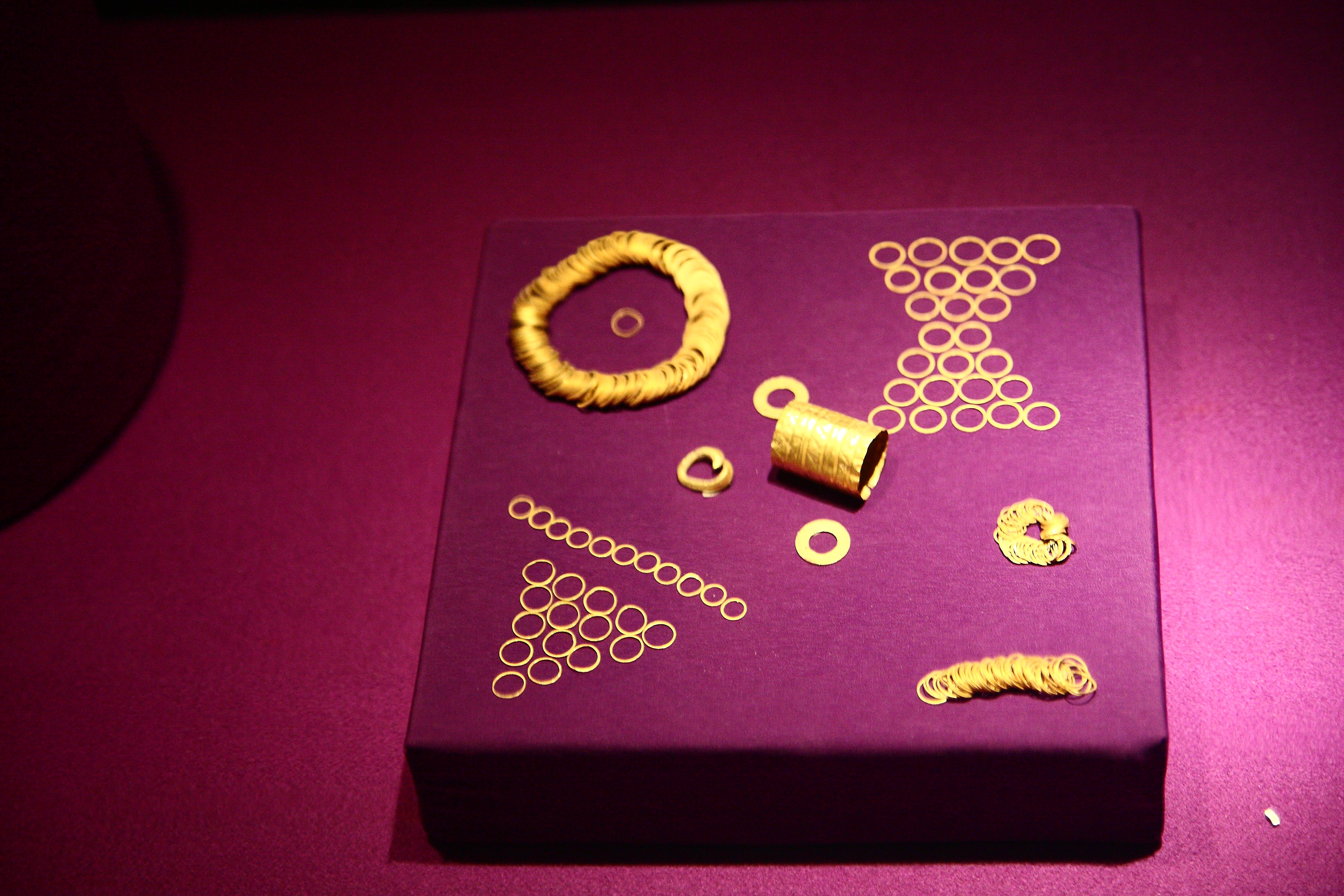

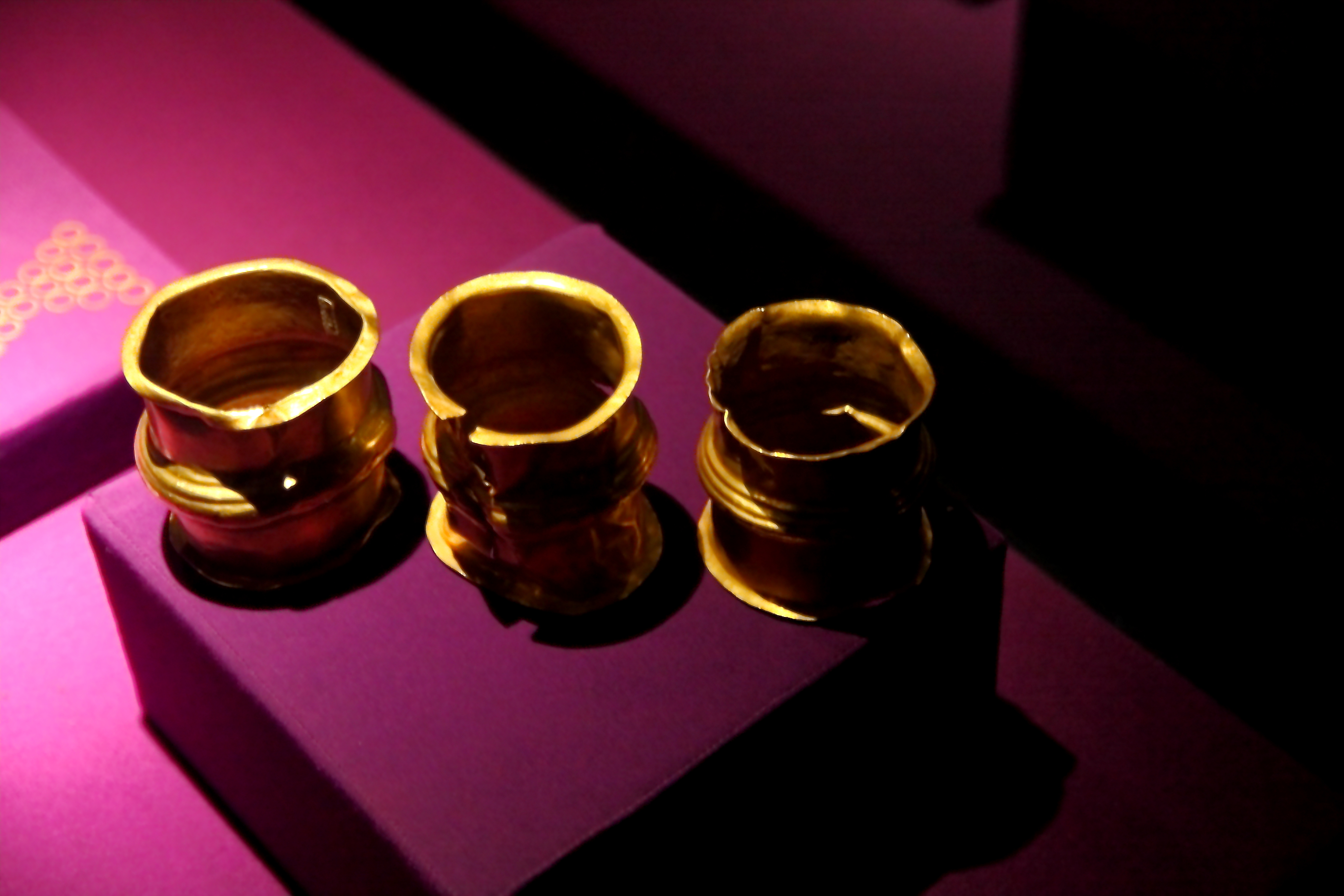

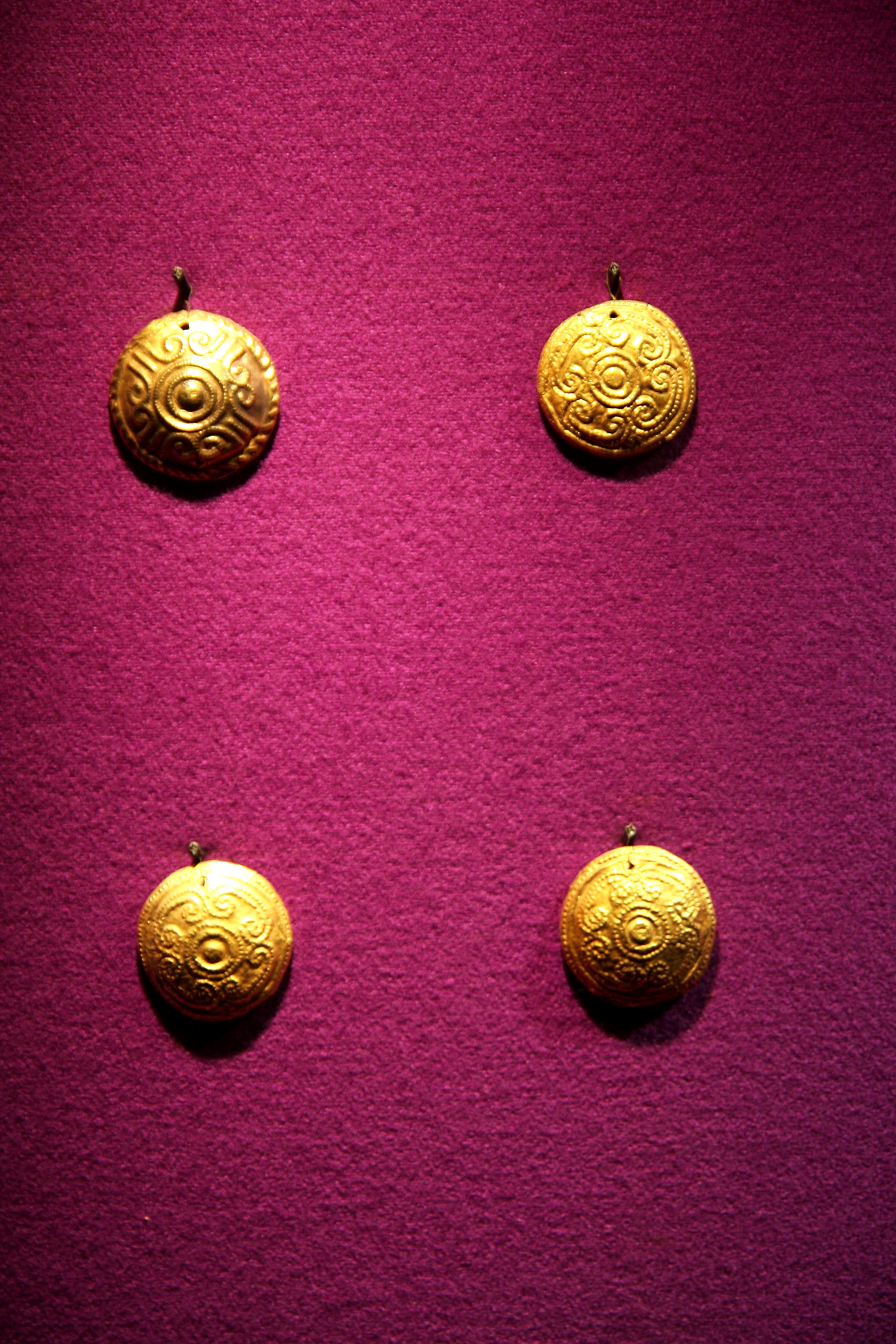

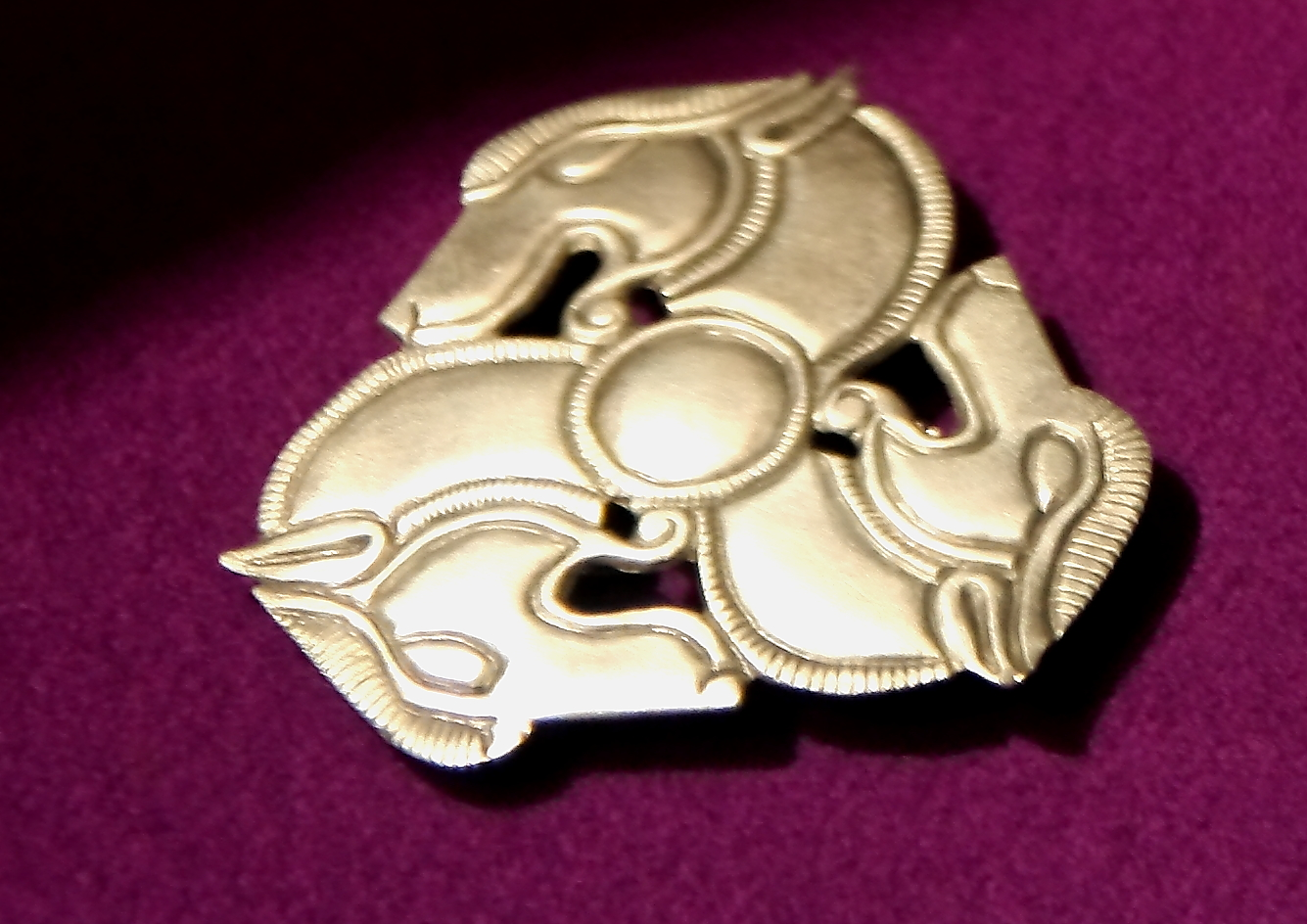

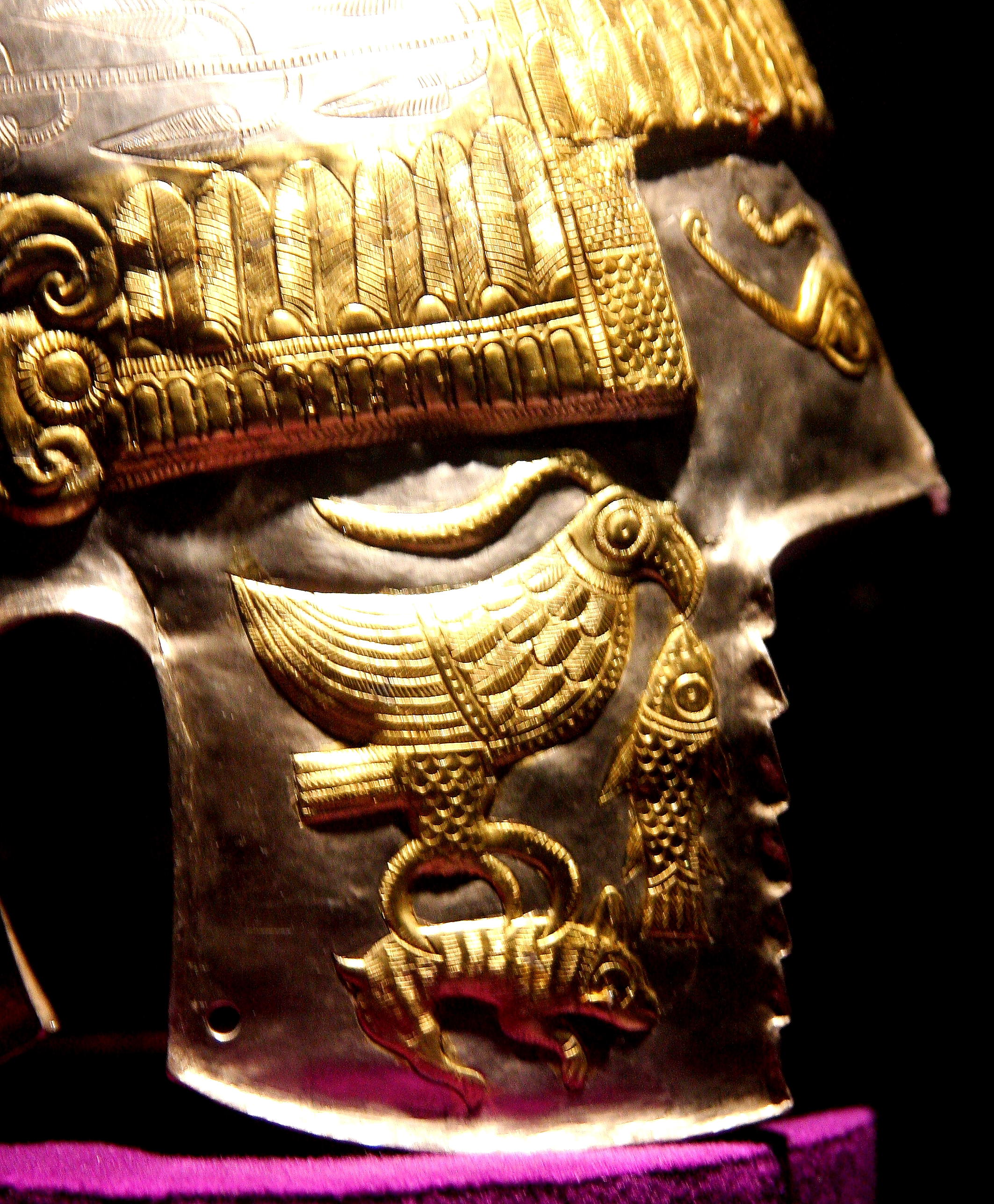

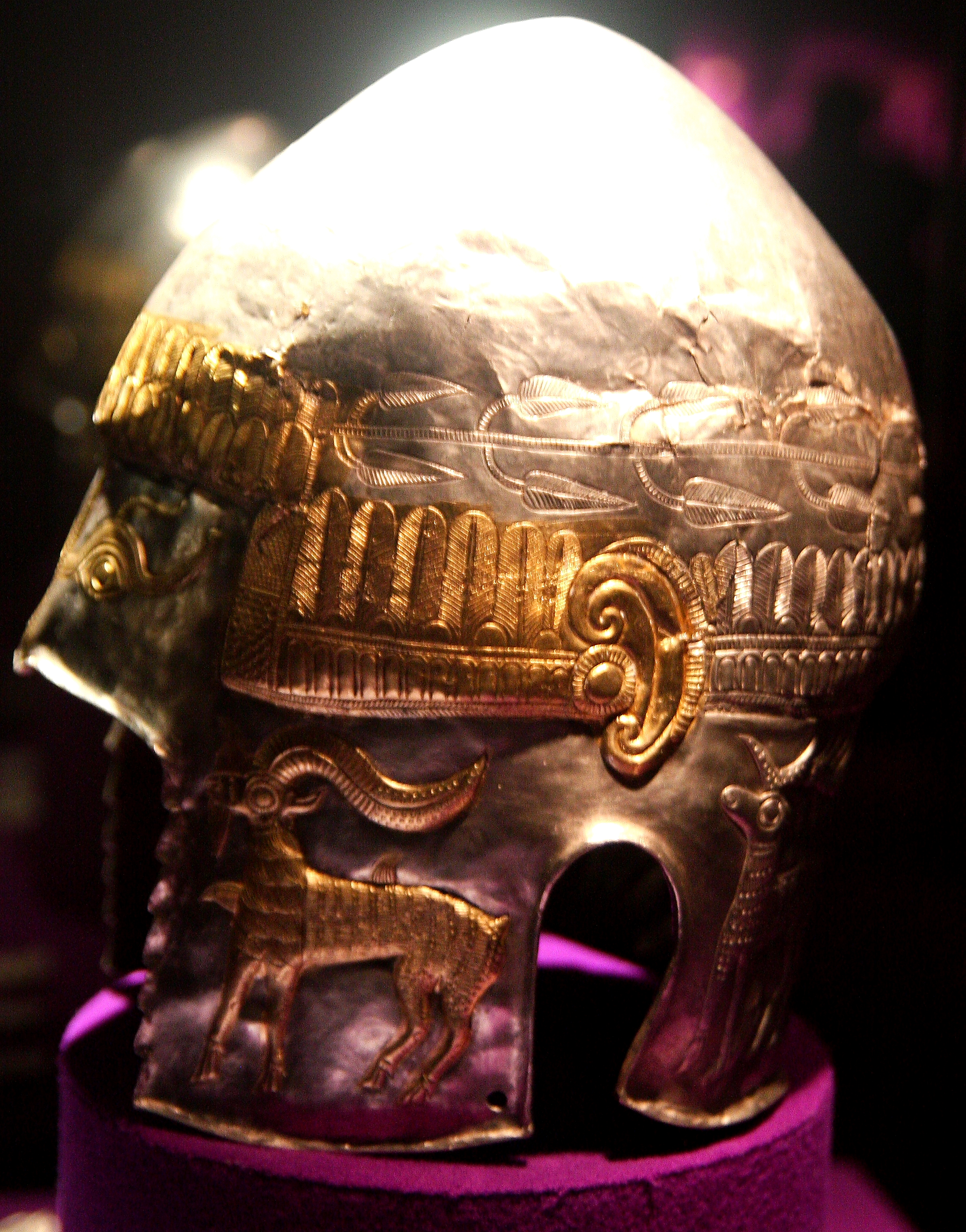

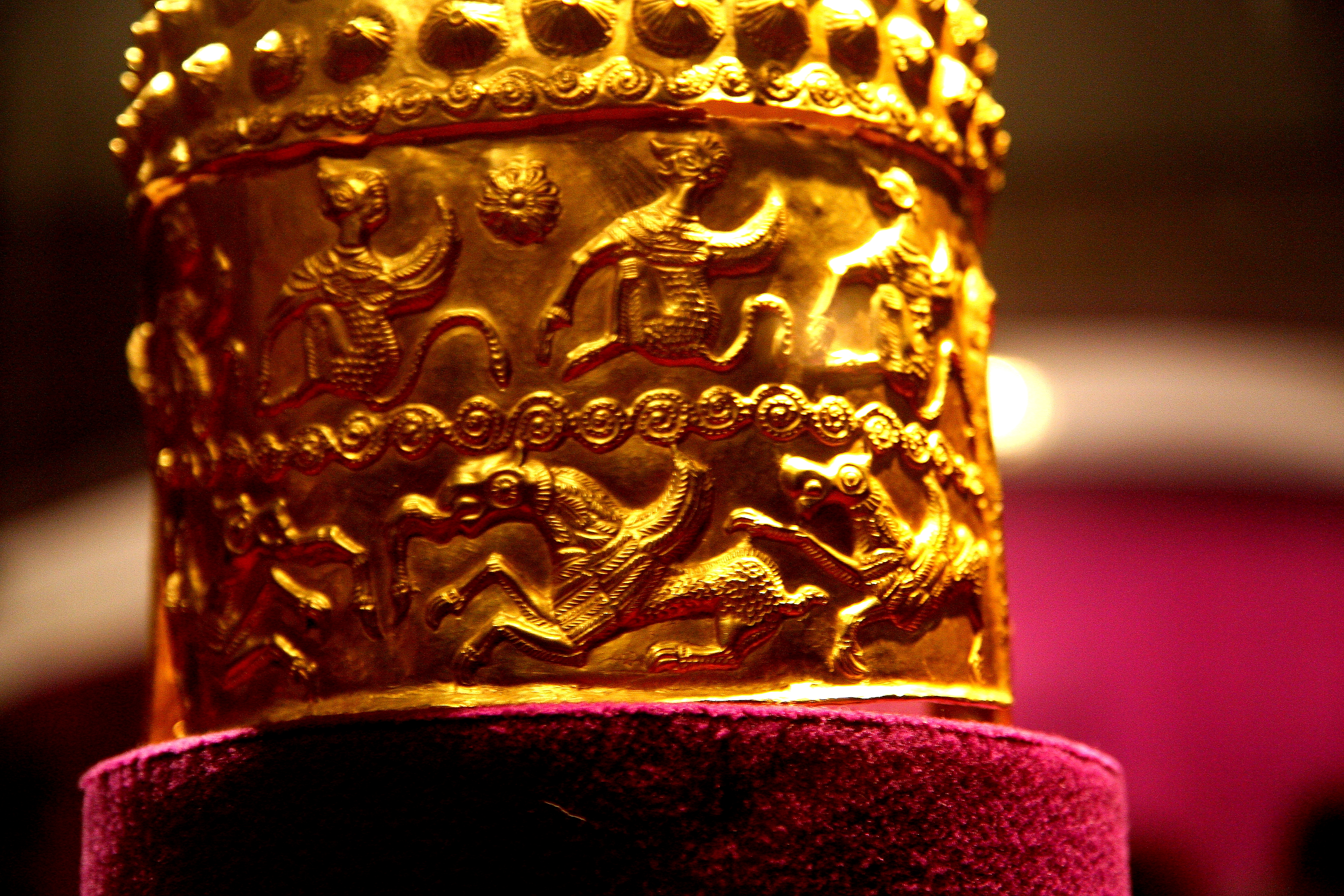

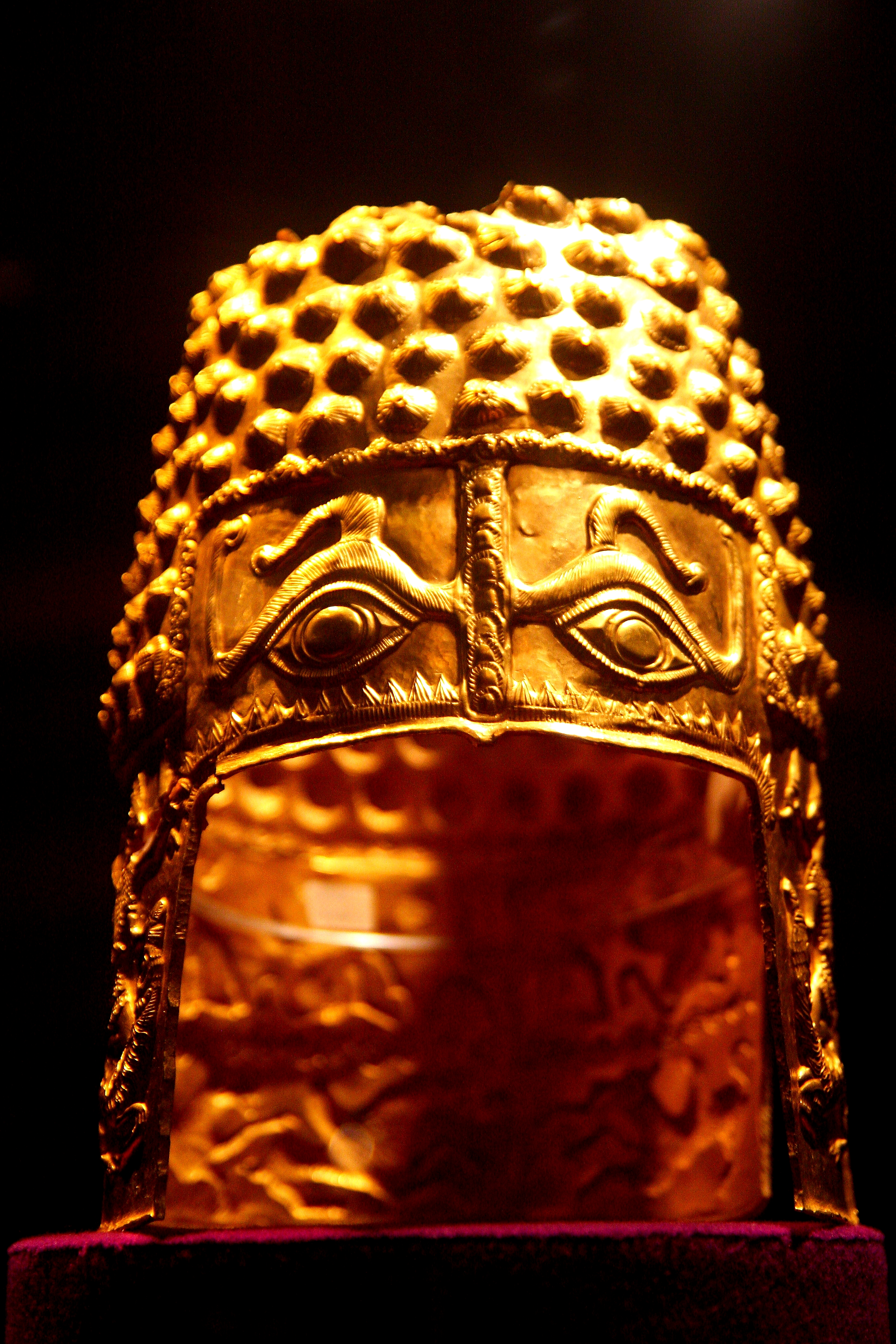

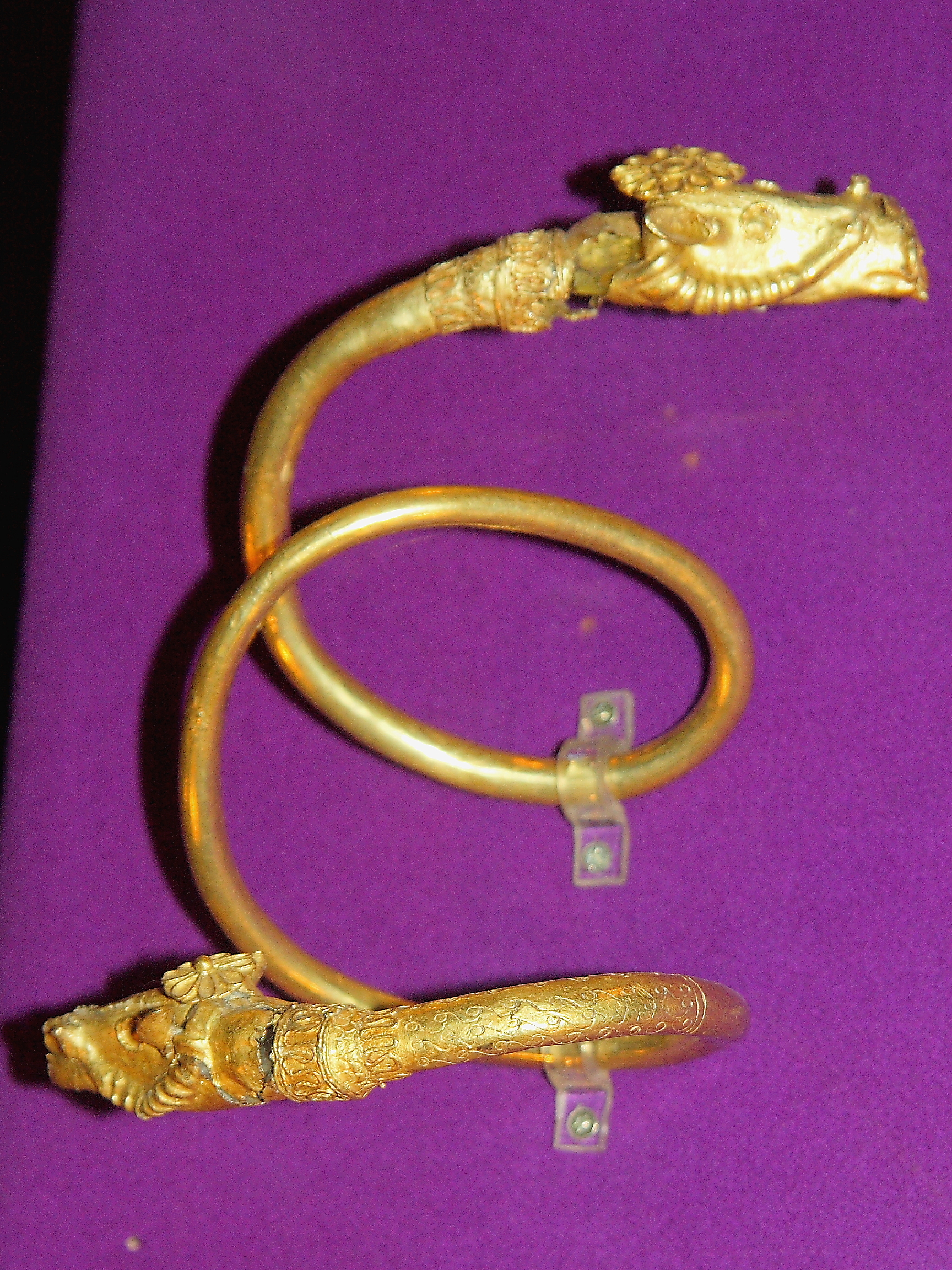

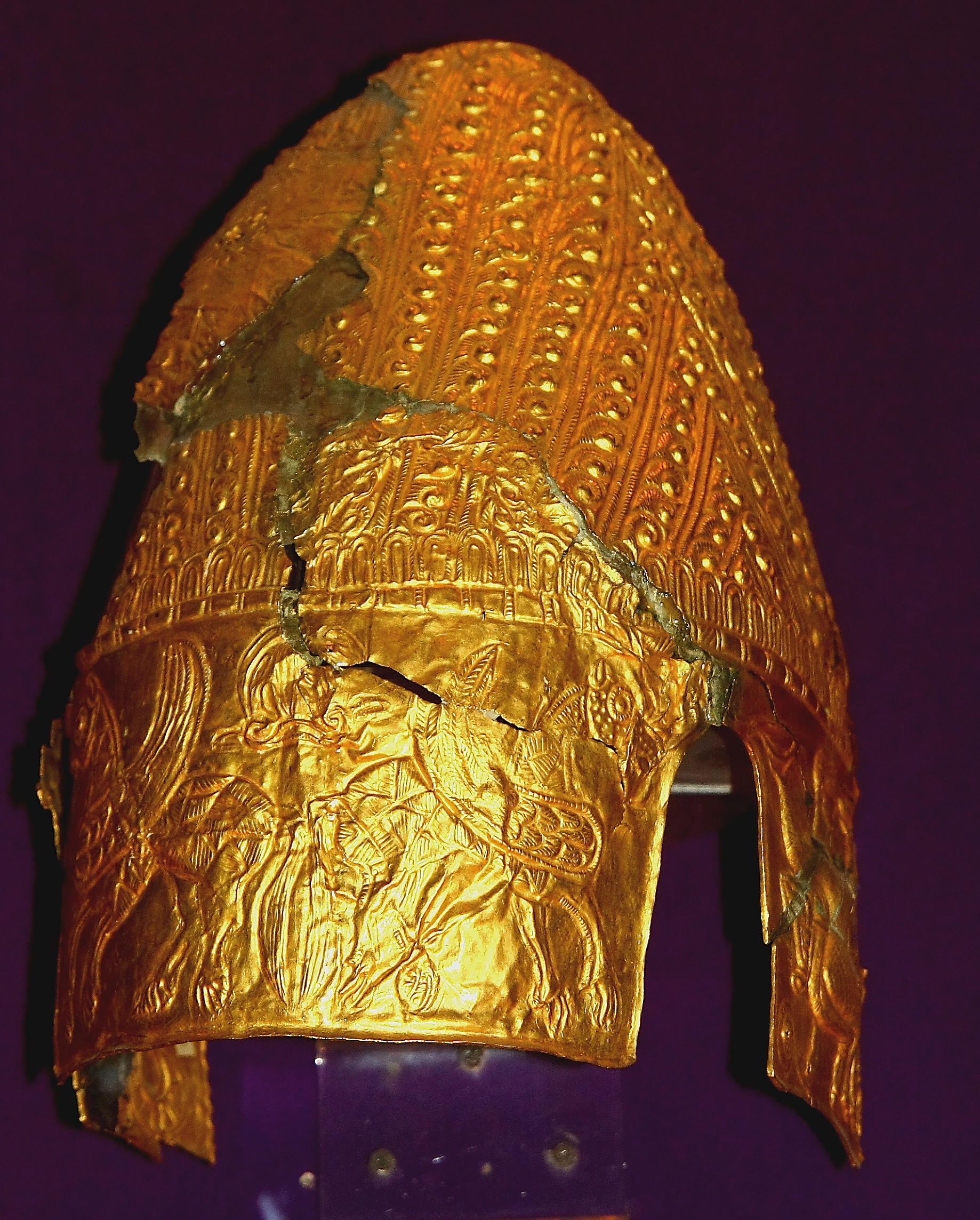

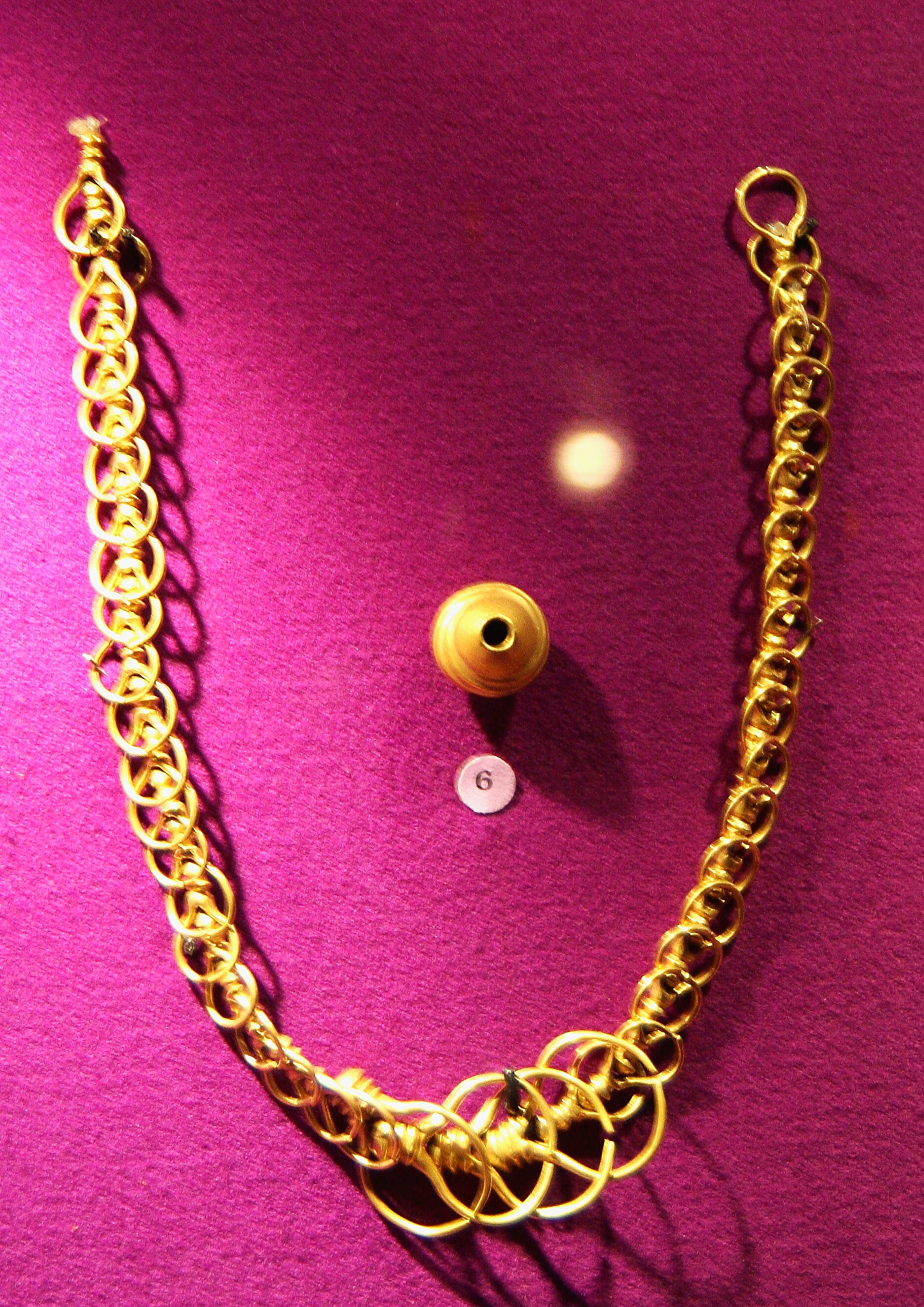

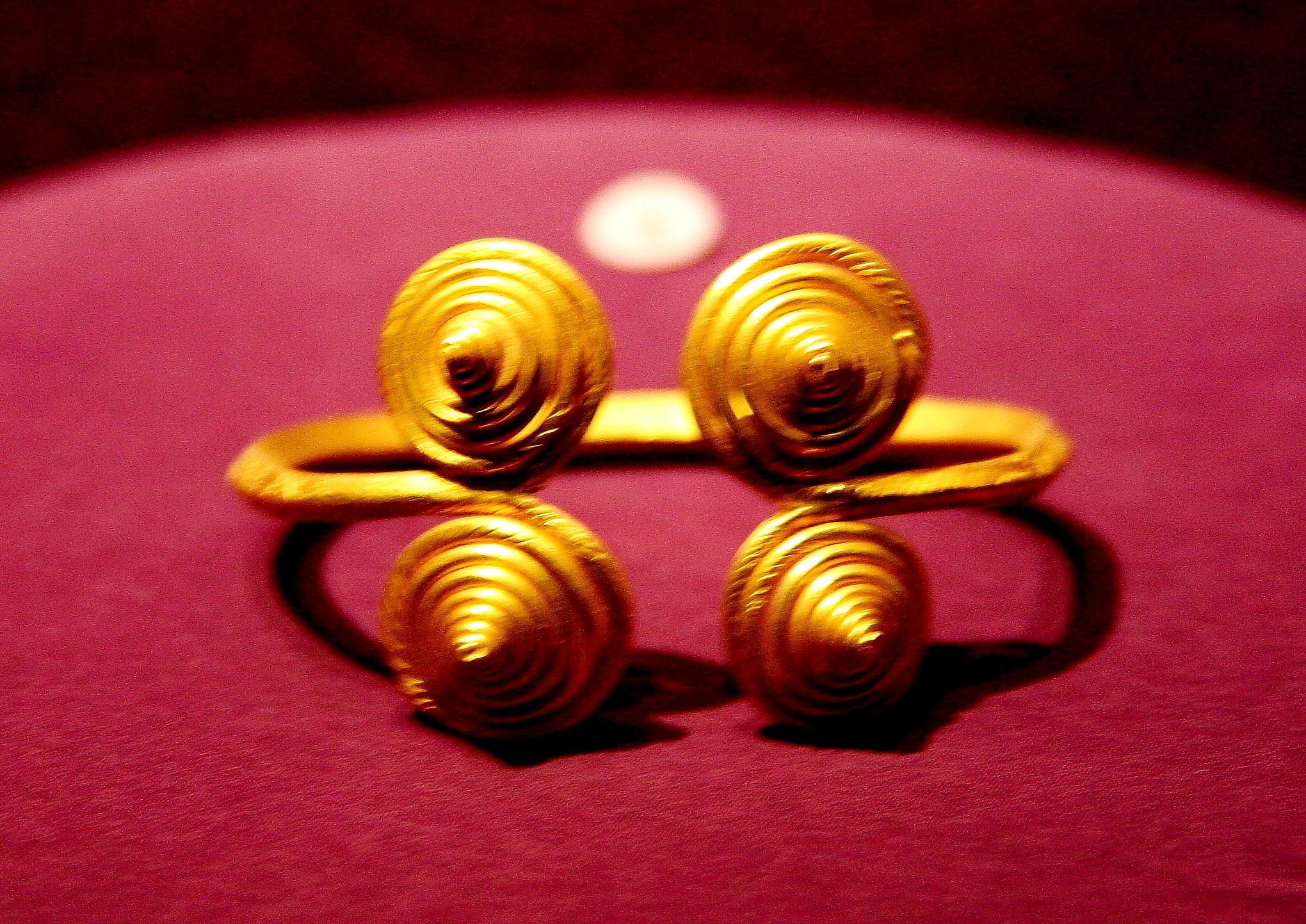

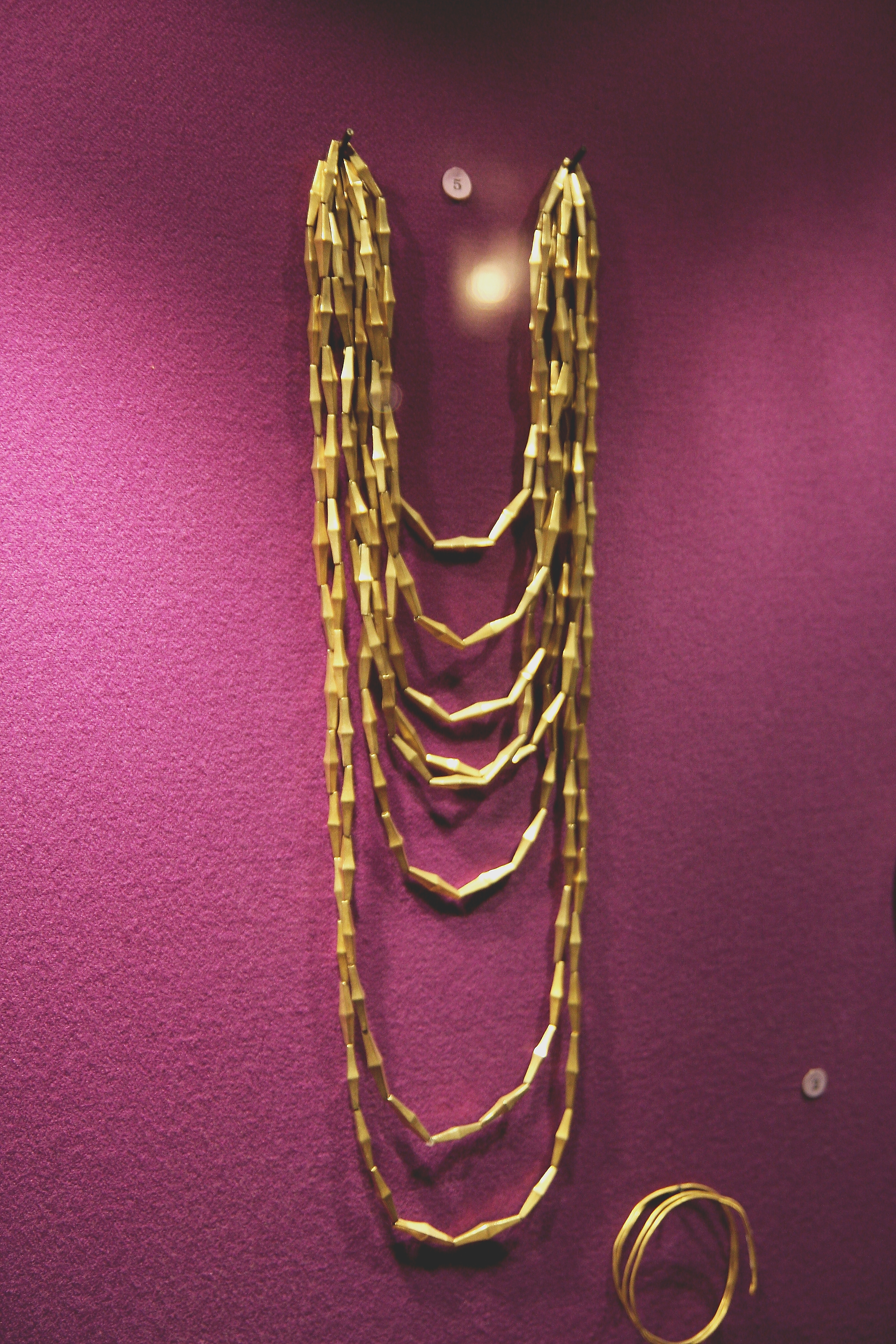

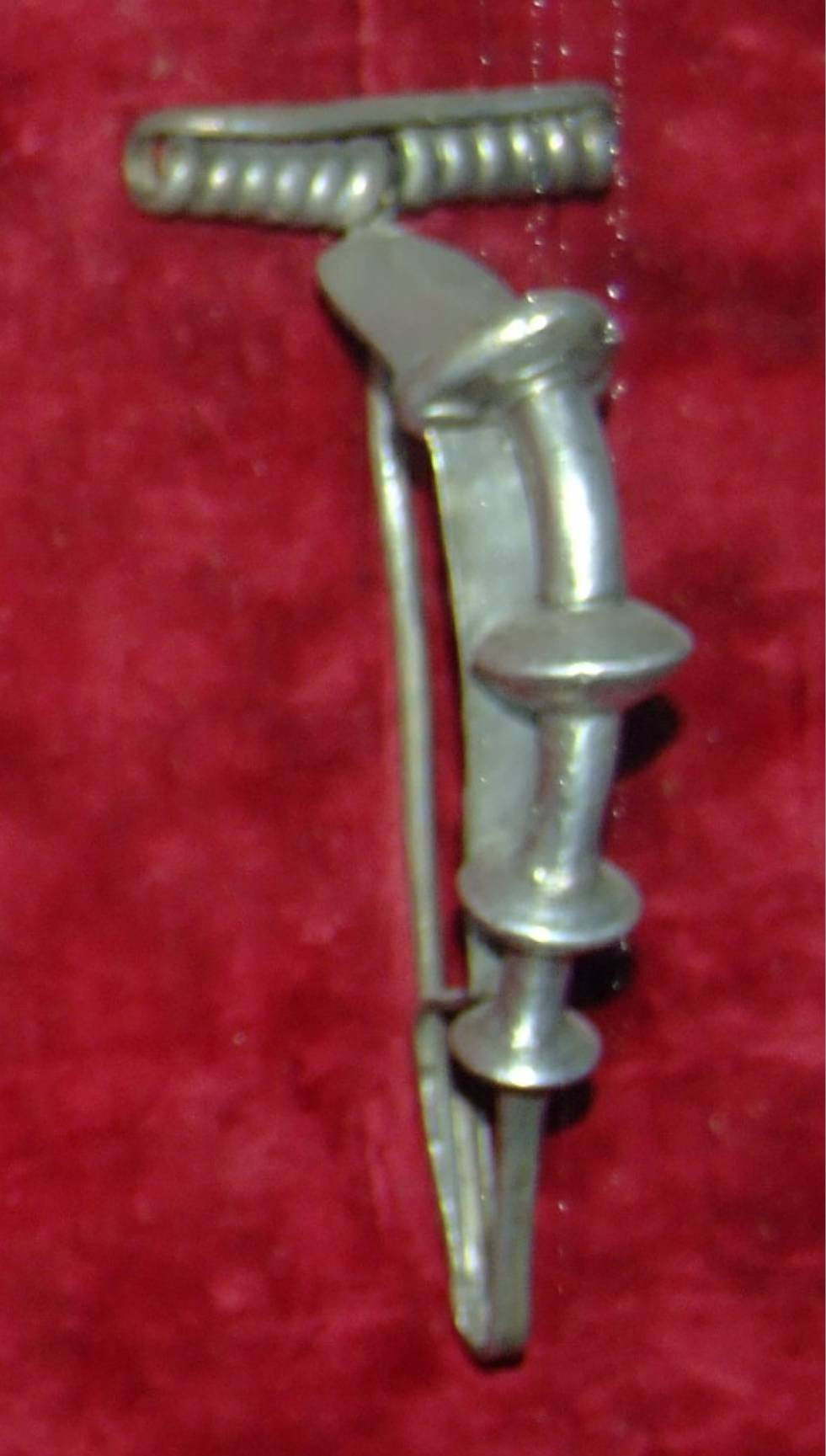

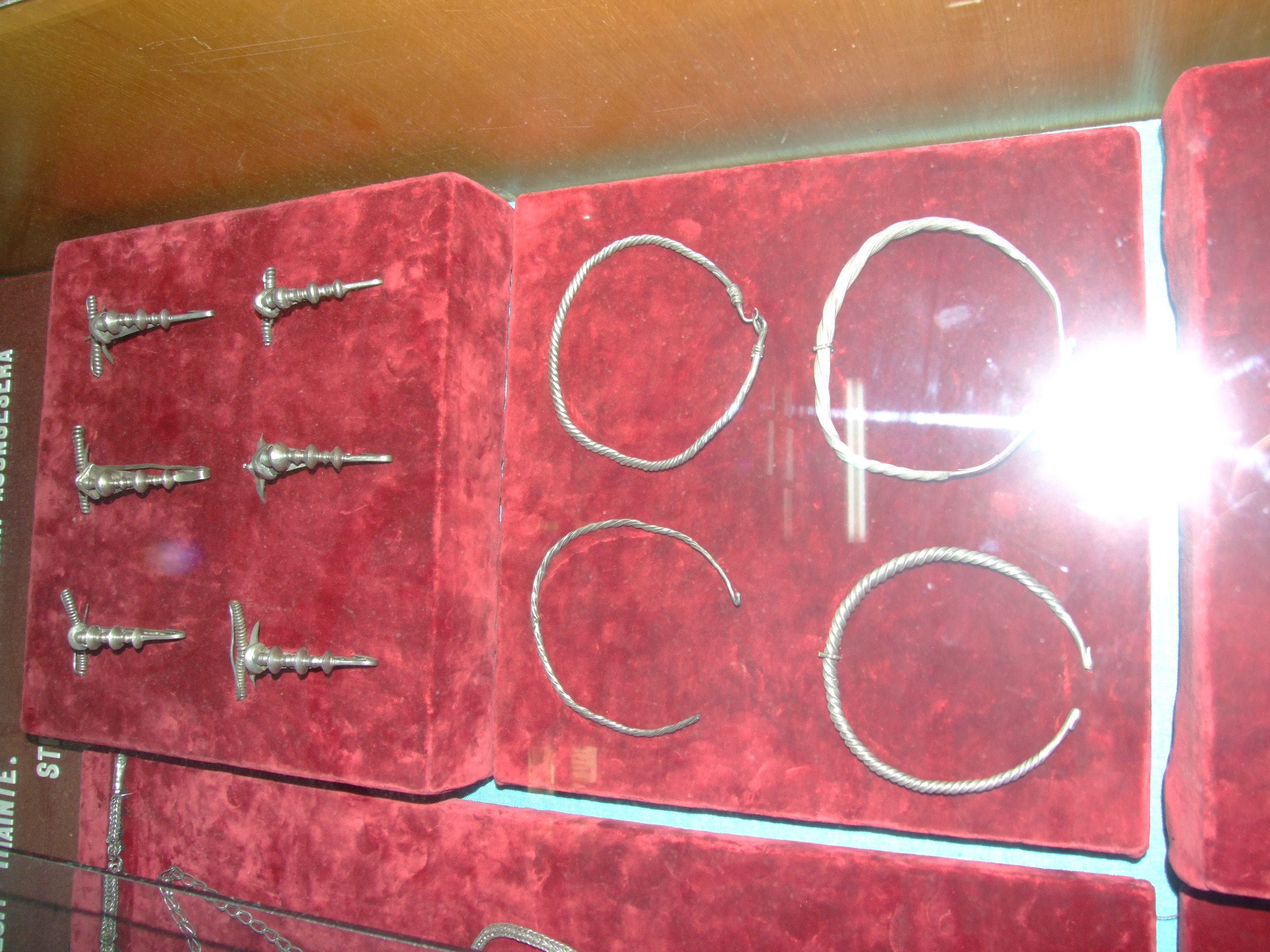

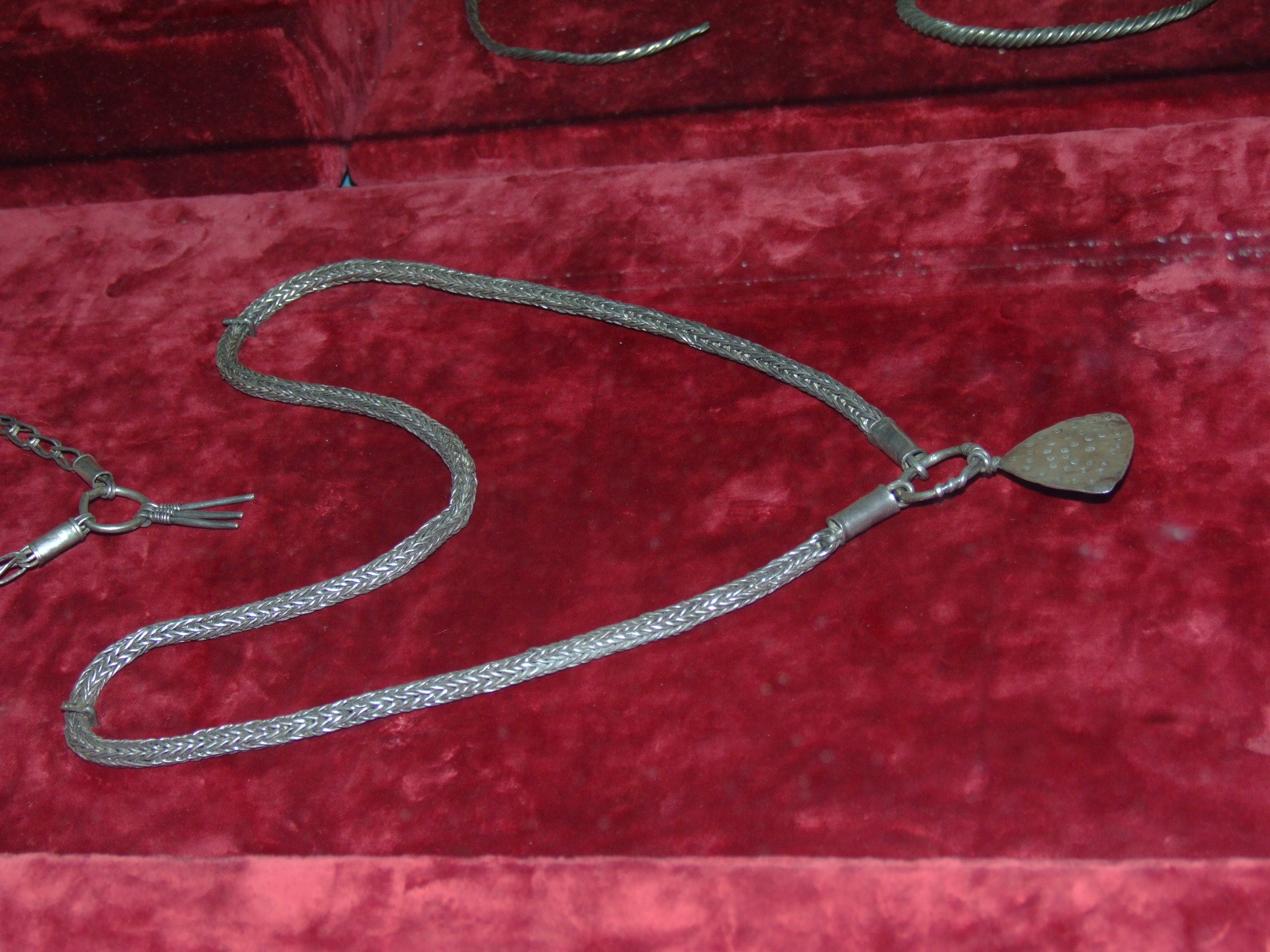

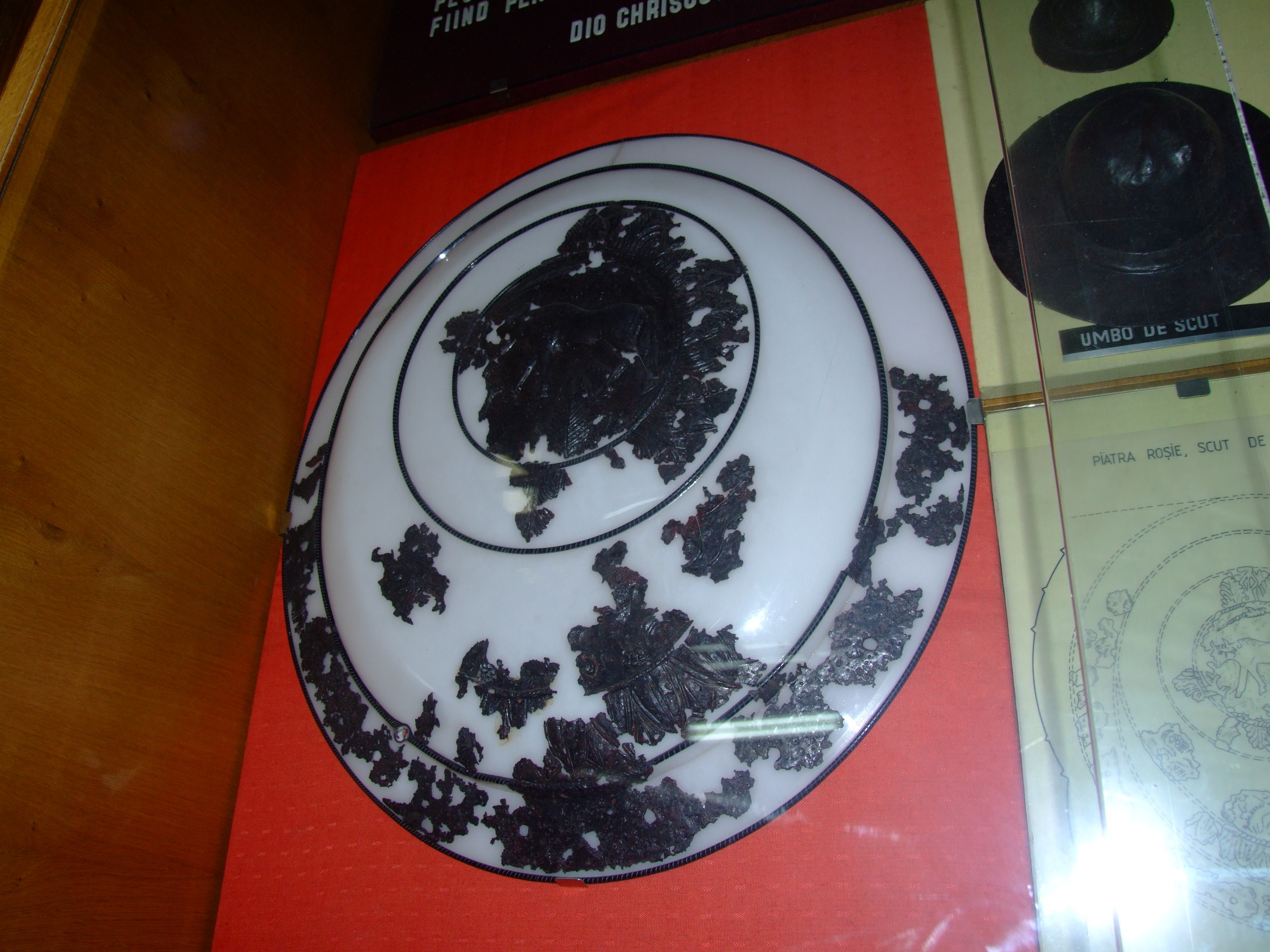

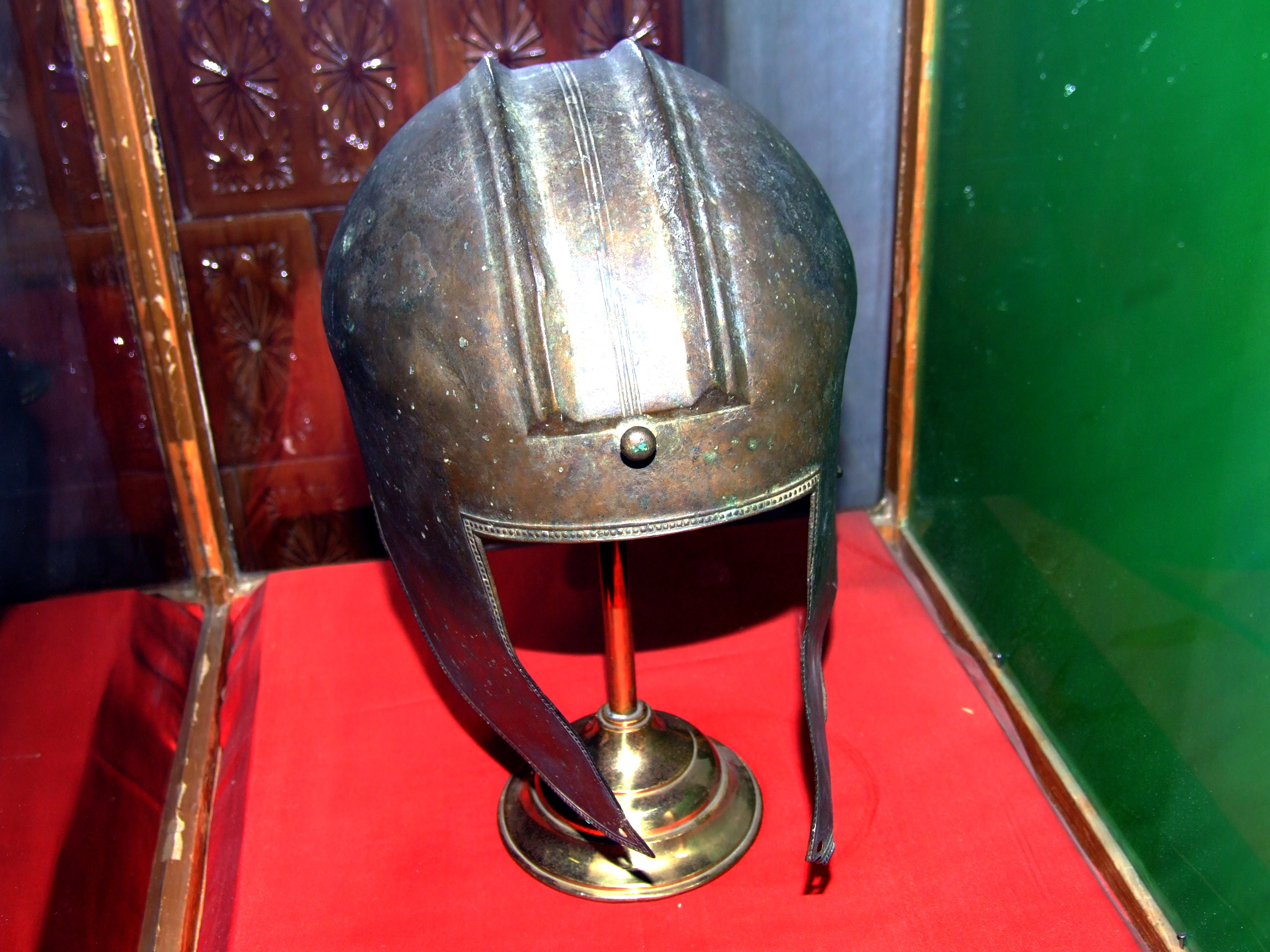

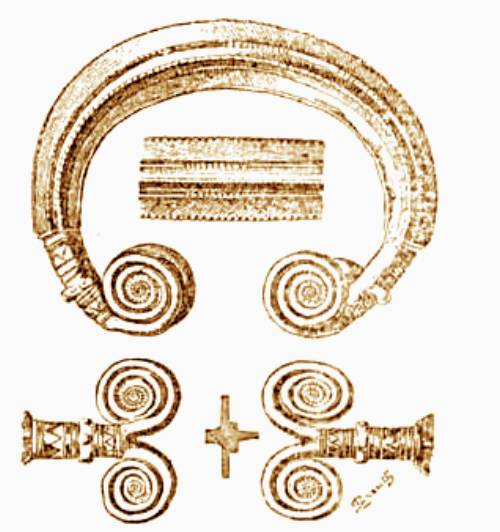

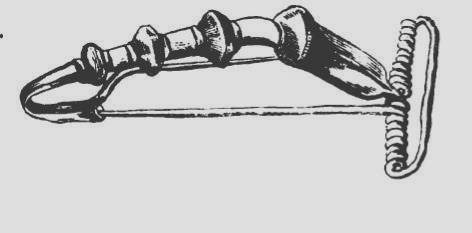

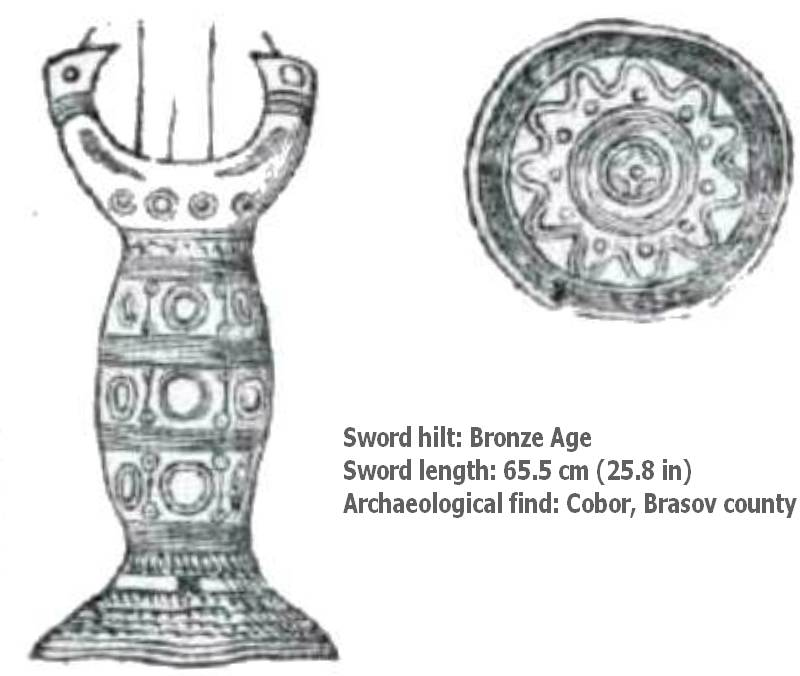

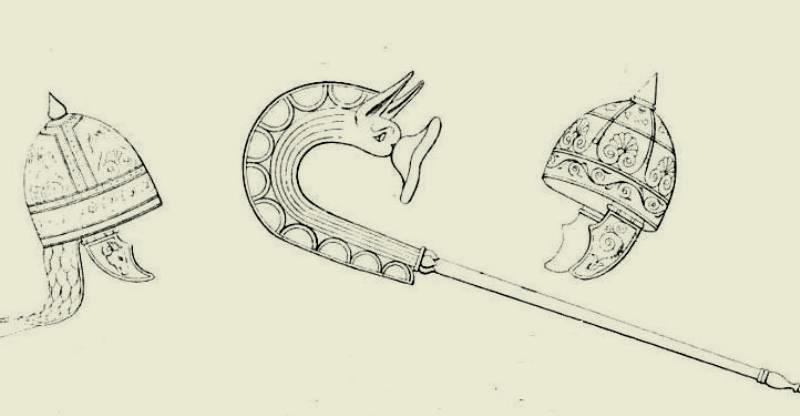

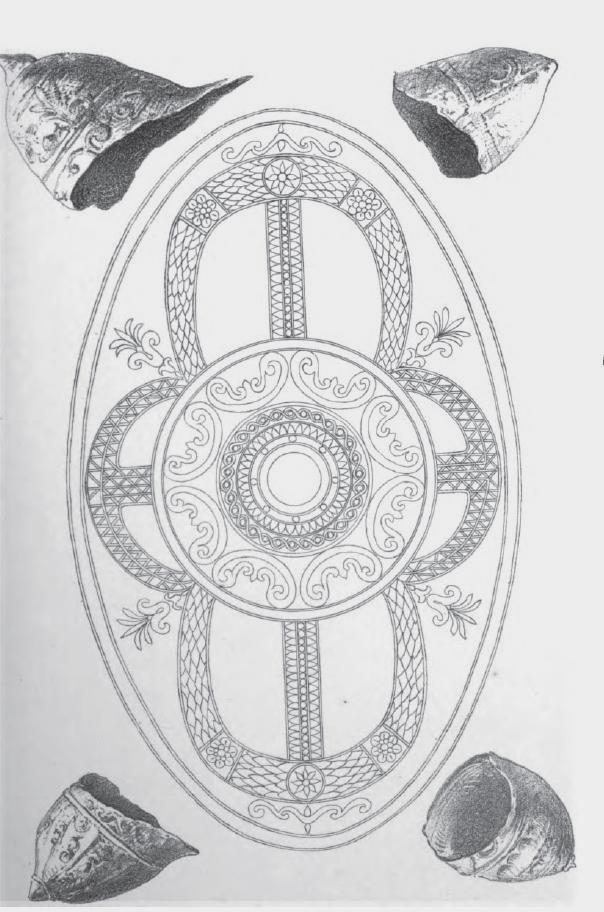

== See also ==
- Thracian treasure
- Scythian art
