= Pazardzhik Clock Tower =

Clock Tower
- Часовникова кула
- A view of the clock tower

General information
- Status: Restored
- Type: Ottoman clock tower
- Architectural style: Ottoman architecture
- Location: Pazardzhik, Pazardzhik Province, Bulgaria
- Coordinates: 42°11′37.8″N 24°20′05.83″E
- Year built: 1741
- Renovated: 2010

Height
- Height: 27 m

Dimensions
- Other dimensions: 4.75 m × 4.75 m (square base)

Technical details
- Material: Stone masonry and sheet metal

The Pazardzhik Clock Tower (Bulgarian: Часовникова кула) is an Ottoman era clock tower located in Pazardzhik, southern Bulgaria. The clock tower was built in 1741 as part of the then-biggest han, financed by an Ottoman military official. Most of the tower was destroyed as a consequence of the Chirpan earthquake in 1928.

Despite the lack of sufficient information, as only one photo and a painting of the clock tower in its original state exists, the upper part of the structure was restored in 2010 with the help of a fundraiser initiated by the Rotary Club of Pazardzhik.

== History ==
The first clock tower in Pazardzhik existed before 1658, making the city one of the earliest settlements in what is now Bulgaria to have this type of structure. During the 17th century, there were only around 20 structures of this type throughout Bulgaria. The clock tower in Pazardzhik was also mentioned in the travel accounts of Evliya Çelebi, an Ottoman traveller, writer and geographer, who recorded his journeys through Bulgaria.

In 1741, a new stone clock tower was built, forming part of the Kurshum Han in Pazardzhik. It was the largest han in Bulgaria, constructed in 1574, with the clock tower standing directly in the courtyard of the inn. The construction of the tower was financed by Ibrahim Agha Hayrulov, an Ottoman military official. Only one photograph, taken in 1923 by Ivan Batakliev, a geographer and historian born in the city, and a painting by Stoyan Vasilev depicting the original tower have survived. Five years later, the upper part of the clock tower collapsed as a result of the Chirpan earthquake, leaving only the lower masonry section standing. The bell of the structure was stored in a school in Pazardzhik until it was lost in 1980.

In April 2009, architect Hristo Gerasimov received approval for a restoration project of the clock tower with the renovation starting a month later. The cost was calculated to be around 100,000 BGN, which was collected with the help of a fundraiser, initiatied by the Rotary Club of Pazardzhik. Donations included 15,000 BGN from a local municipal councillor, 1000 BGN from the then-mayor of the city Todor Popov, and the profit from the sale of postcards. A part of the project was also financed directly by Pazardzhik Municipality. The renovation was concluded on 21 May 2010, the city's holiday.

== Architecture ==
The base of the tower consists of a stone structure approximately 6 metres high, with a square ground plan and walls measuring 4.75 metres in length. The structure narrows towards the top and continues in the form of a prism. It is uncertain whether the original upper section had six, eight or twelve sides.

Only the original lower stone masonry section of the tower has survived. The remainder of the structure was reconstructed to resemble the original building as closely as possible. Above this section is a four-sided clock chamber containing four Swiss clock mechanisms.
