= Chitalishte Videlina =

Chitalishte Videlina - 1862
- Читалище Виделина - 1862
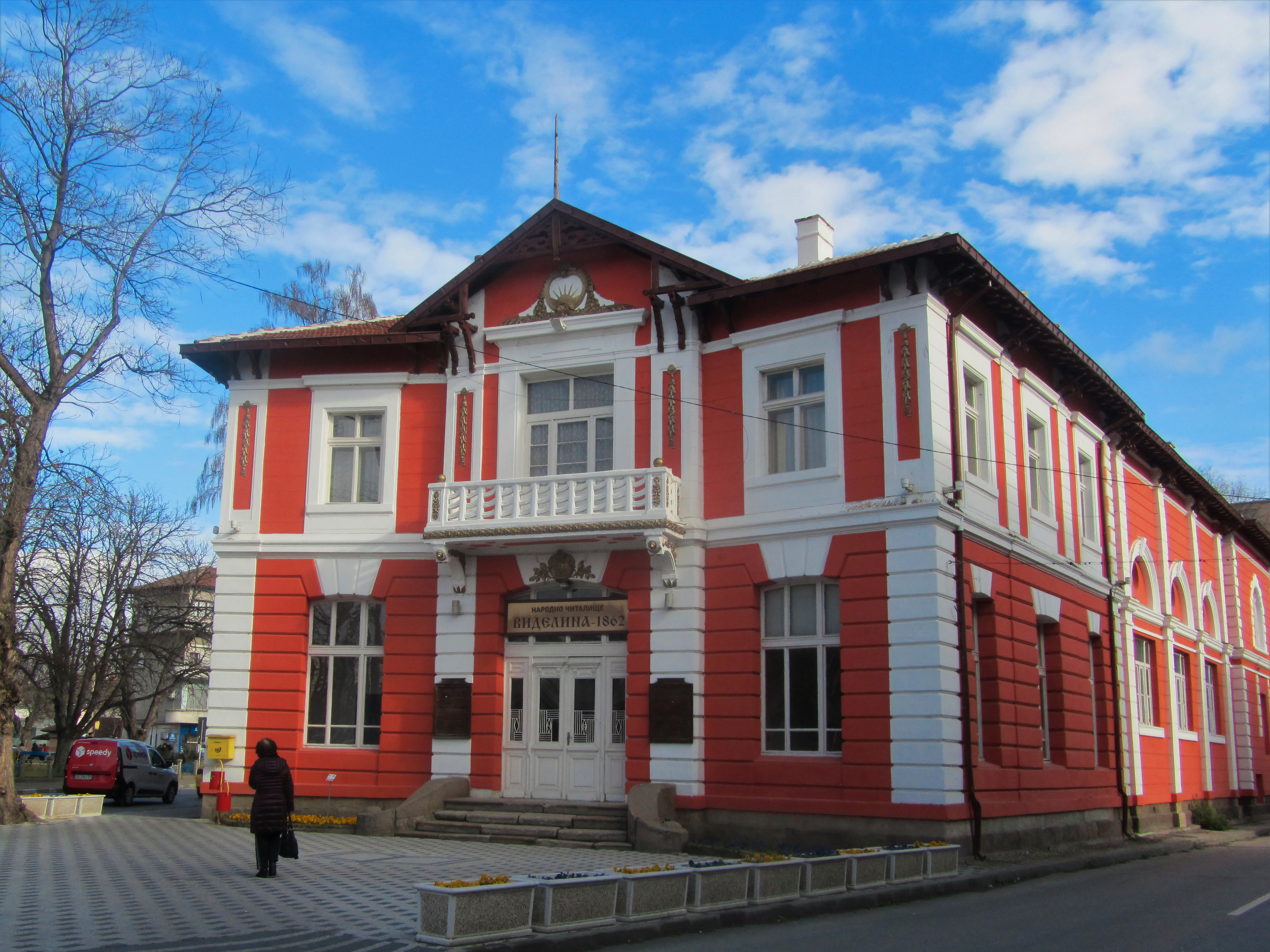

General information
- Status: Active
- Location: bul. Bulgaria 25
- Town or city: Pazardzhik
- Country: Bulgaria
- Coordinates: 42.18752°N 24.32908°E
- Completed: 1862
- Owner: Dimitar Vasilev Kibritov

Chitalishte Videlina - 1862 (Bulgarian: Читалище Виделина - 1862) is a chitalishte or cultural centre, located in Pazardzhik, Bulgaria. It is one of the three of its kind in Pazardzhik, the others being ''Hristo Botev'' and the third - ''Nikola Vaptsarov''

== History ==
Videlina was founded in 1862 by Stefan Zahariev, Stanislav Dospevski and Kara Nikola Angelov. Dospevski coined the name of the chitalishte Videlina. The building was built 35 years later.

In the beginning of 1863, a community board was installed, which was later discontinued in 1875-1876. On 18 January 1871, Zahariev handed over the library to the community board. After the Liberation of Bulgaria, on 18 January 1885, the cultural centre resumed the council board and new members were elected. Its previous location was demolished in 1889, which let a new building being constructed in 1897, which in modern times, is still active.

== Activity ==
Chitalishte Videlina is a participant in cultural activities with its lessons on ballet, piano, art, etc.

== See also ==
- Chitalishte Hristo Botev 1884, Botevgrad
