= Pazardzhik =

Pazardzhik Пазарджик
- Town
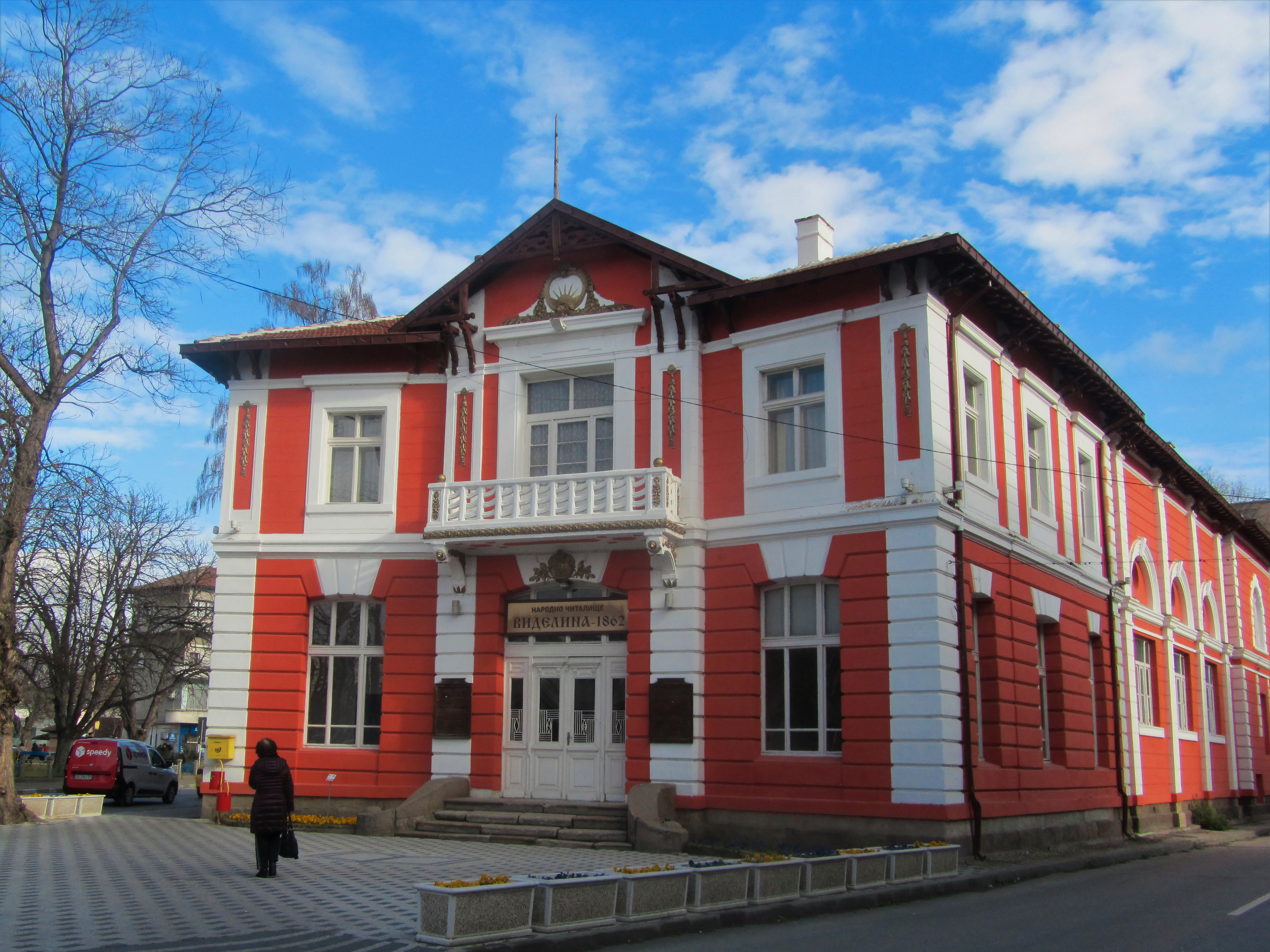
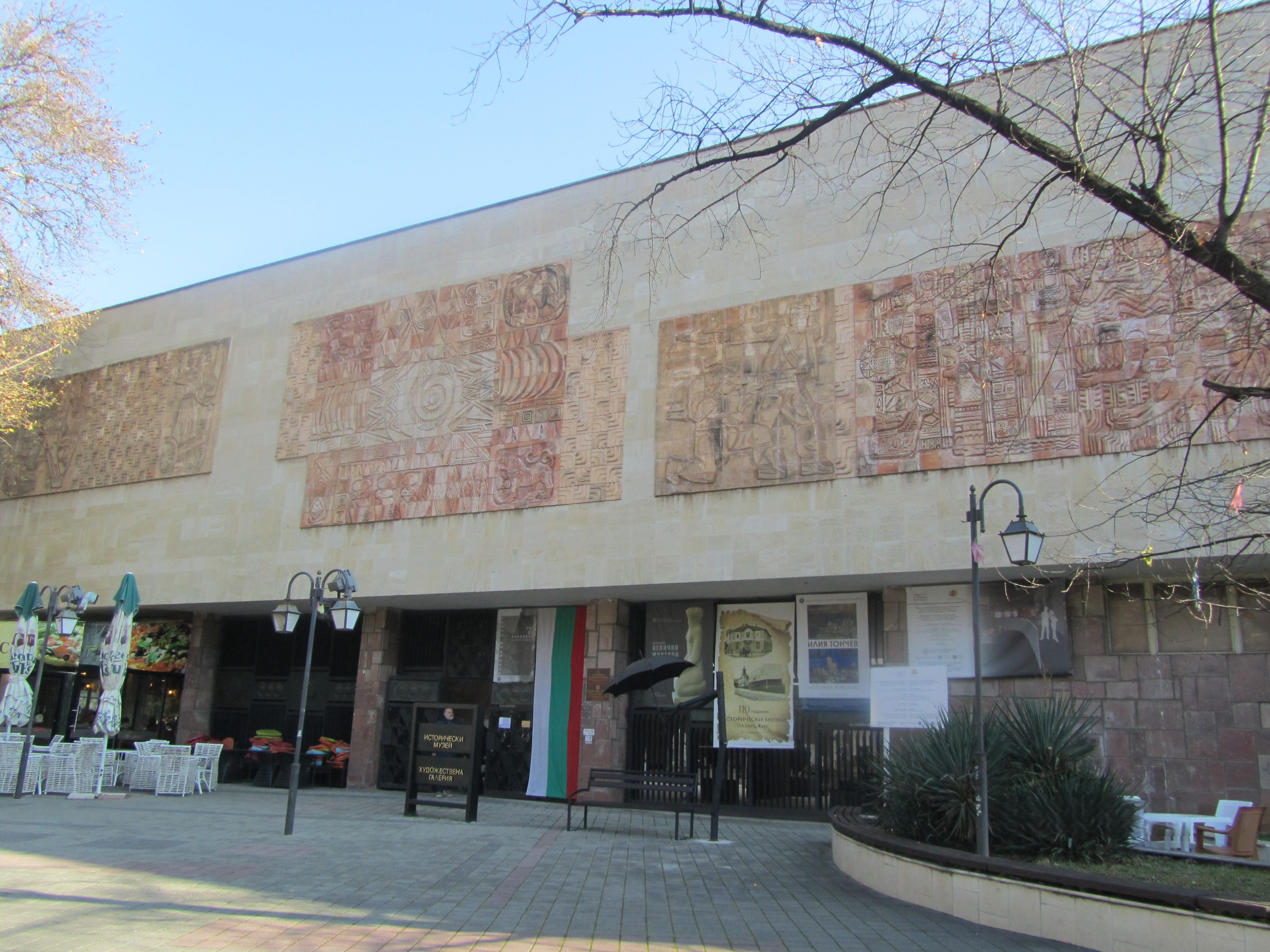
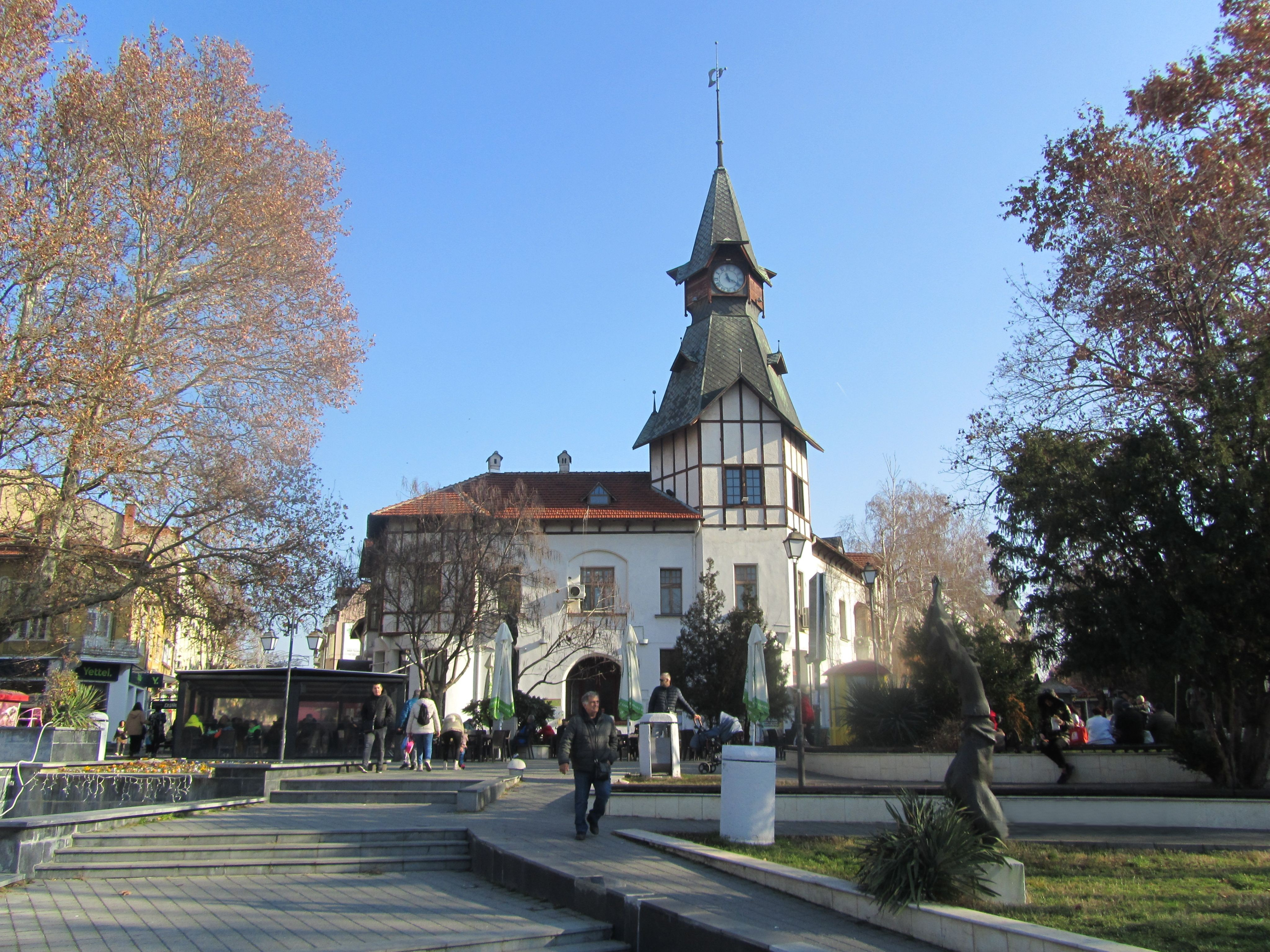
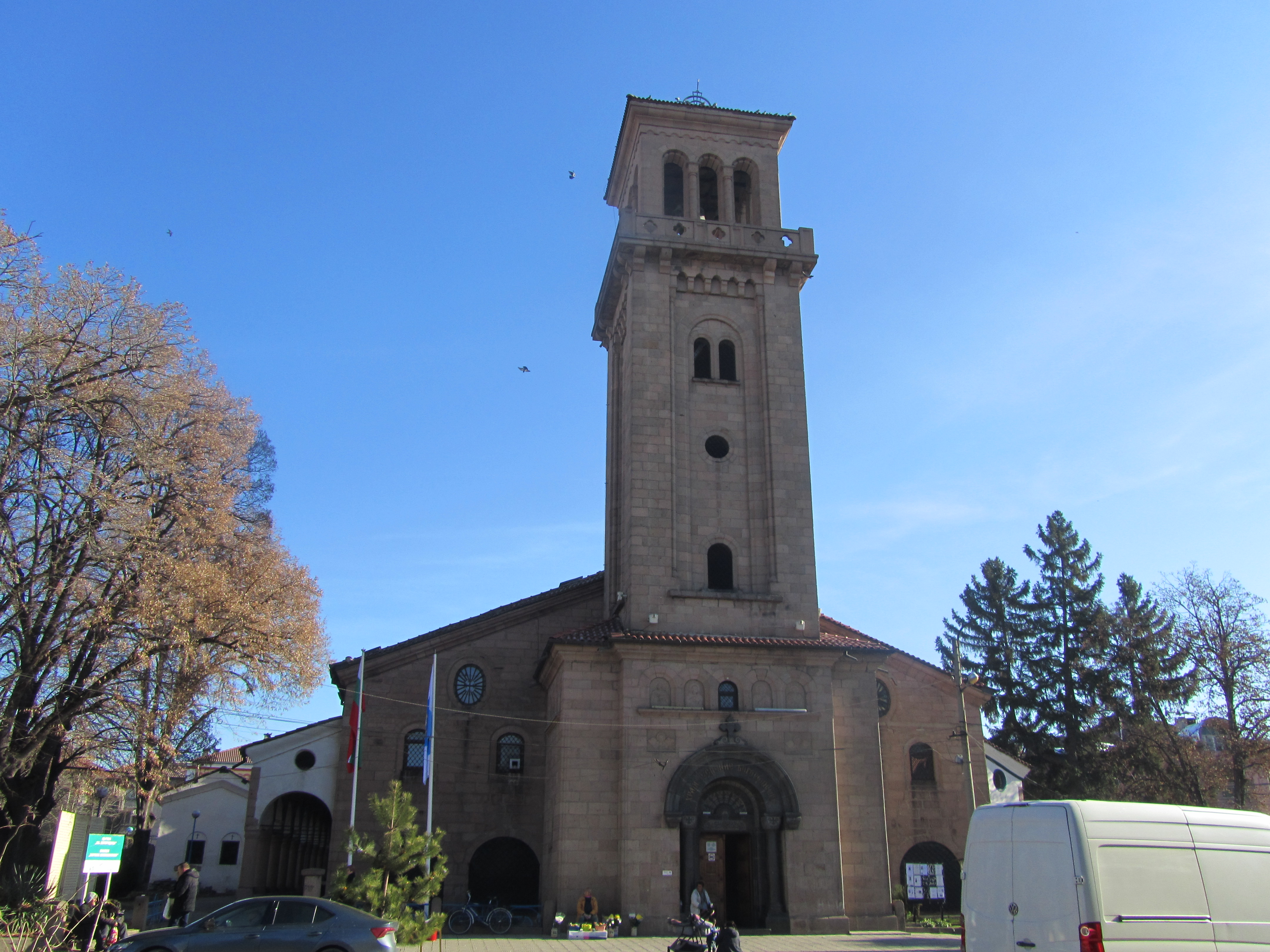
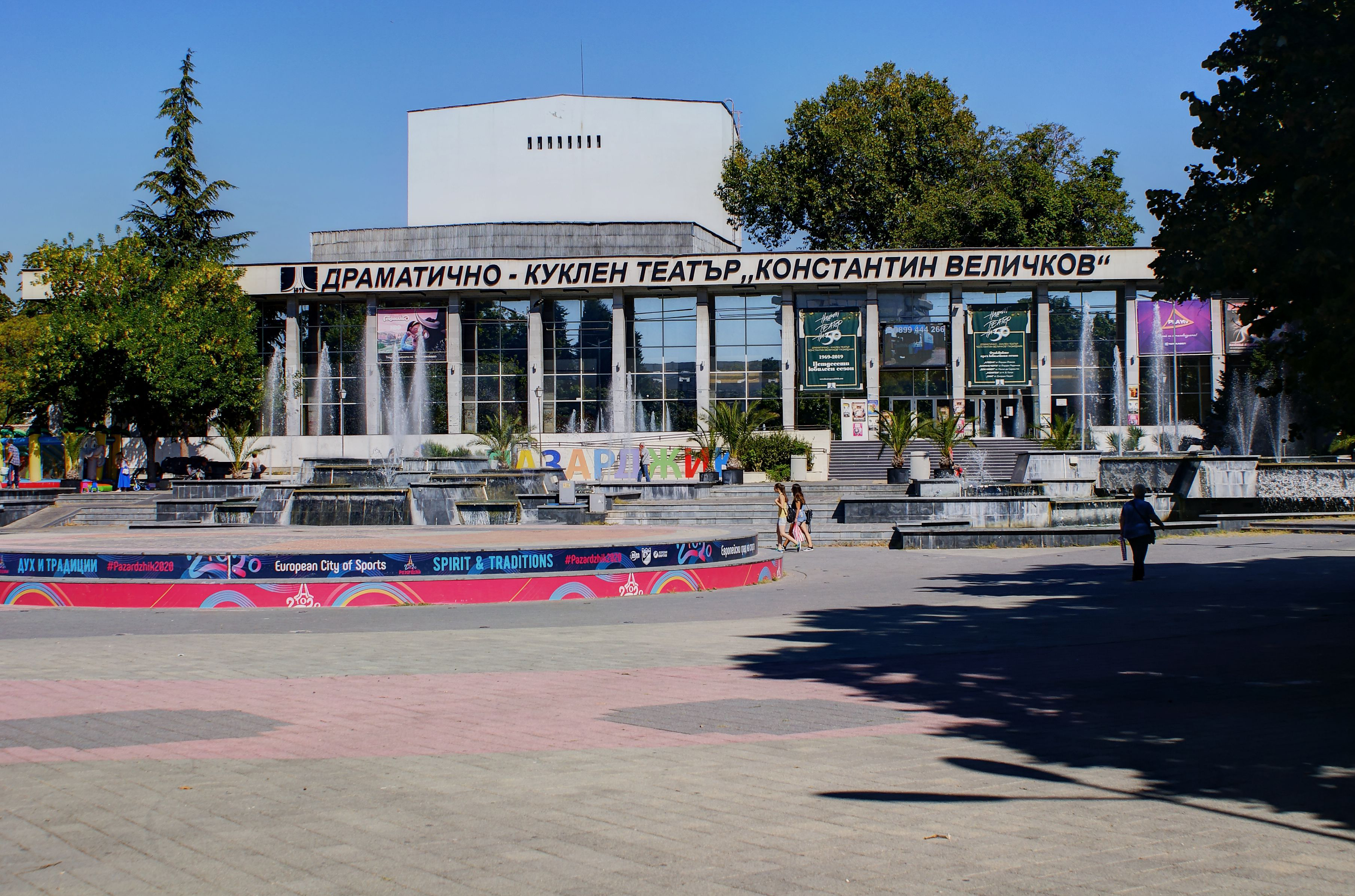
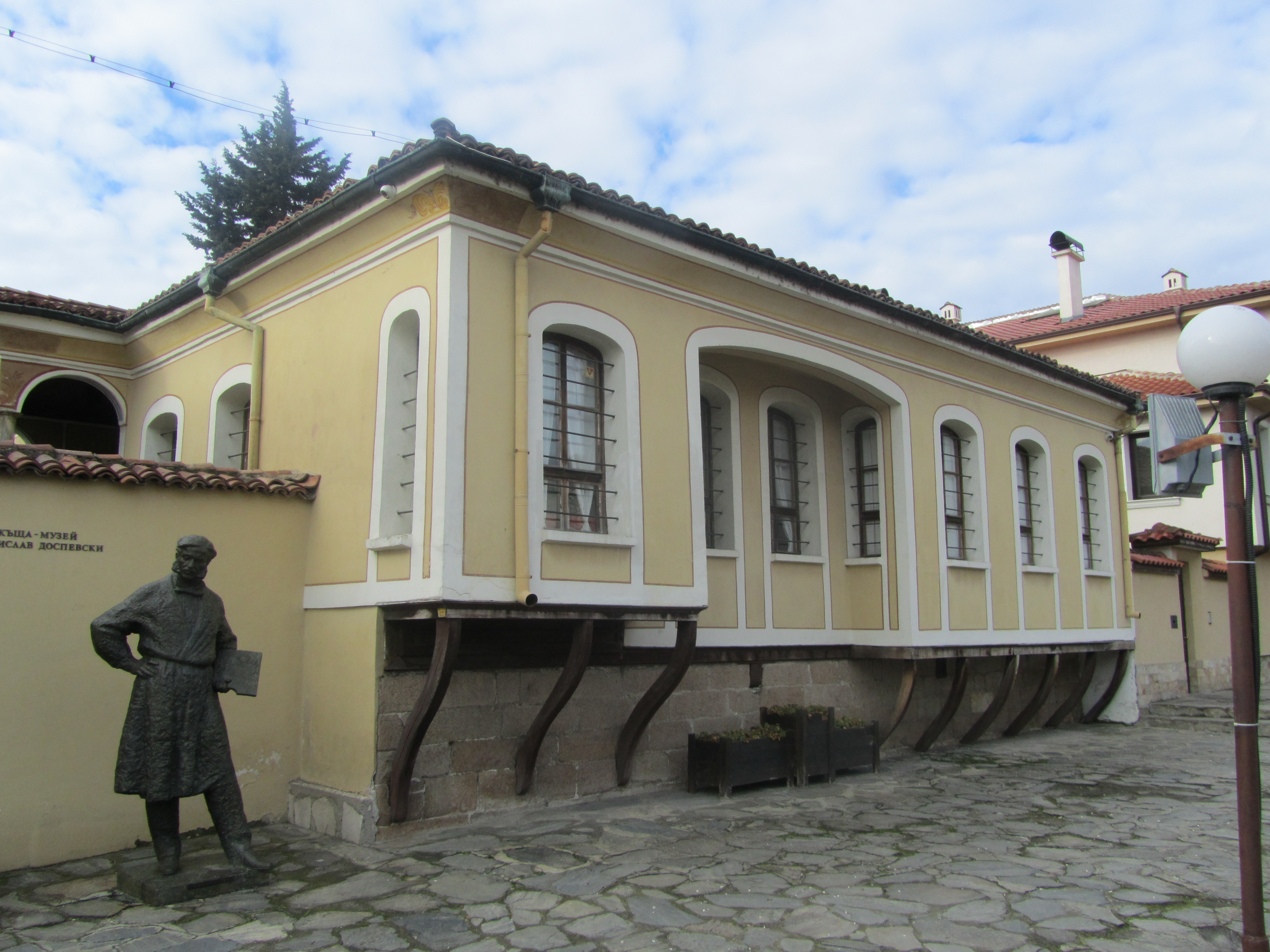
- Clockwise from top: Panorama of Pazardzhik, Chitalishte Videlina, Regional Historical Museum, The old post office and clock tower, Church of the Dormition, Drama and Puppet Theatre Konstantin Velichkov, Art Gallery Stanislav Dospevski

- Flag Coat of arms

- Location of Pazardzhik Pazardzhik (Balkans)
- Coordinates: 42°12′N 24°20′E
- Country: Bulgaria
- Province (Oblast): Pazardzhik

Government
  - Mayor: Petar Kulenski (PP-DB)

Area
  - Town: 37.382 km^{2} (14.433 sq mi)
- Elevation: 205 m (673 ft)

Population (2022)
  - Town: 55,220
  - Urban: 90,309
- Demonym: Pazardzhiklia
- Time zone: UTC+2 (EET)
  - Summer (DST): UTC+3 (EEST)
- Postal Code: 4400
- Area code: 034
- License plate: PA
- Website: Official website

Pazardzhik (Bulgarian: Пазарджик [ˈpazɐrd͡ʒik]) is a city situated along the banks of the Maritsa river, southern Bulgaria. It is the centre of Pazardzhik Province and Pazardzhik Municipality. It is located in the Upper Thracian Plain and in the Pazardzhik-Plovdiv Field, a subregion of the plains. It is west of Plovdiv, about 37 kilometres (23 mi), 112 kilometres (70 mi) southeast of Sofia and 288 kilometres (179 mi) from Burgas. The population is 55,220, as it has been growing around from the end of the 19th century to the end of the 20th century. The city reached its highest milestone, exceeding 80,000. Due to poor economic performance in Bulgaria during the 1990s and early 2000s, emigration of Bulgarians began, which affected Pazardzhik as well.

The history of Pazardzhik can be traced back to the 7th millennium BC, with early civilisations being brought from Asia-Minor. They were agro-pastralists and settled near Maritsa, Pazardzhik and Sinitovo. A clay idol named the Pazardzhik Venus was found in 1872. The Drougoubitai tribe settled in the early Middle Ages. Many different researches have all been disputed on the founding of Pazardzhik. One of them was that the city was founded in 1395 by nomads from Saruhan. Another one was three years later in 1398, the city was founded by the migration of Tatars from Actav to Rumelia. The third is about the establishment in 1418, where the Minnet Bey and the Tatars came from Isquilip, and the fourth thesis and the final one is the city's foundation from the resettled Crimean Tatar people. Rice cultivation intensified in the region, which made the economy of the city grow.

During the Russo-Turkish War (1806–1812), there was a brief siege under Count Nikolay Kamensky. In the mid-19th century, it was an important craft and trade centre. Many institutions were established in this period. Тhe Church of the Dormition was first founded. Vasil Levski appointed the revolutionary committee in Pazardzhik as a second centre in 1872. Following 4 years after that, Georgi Benkovski resumed the activity of the committee. During the Russo-Turkish War (1877–1878), Iosif Gurko wrestled the Ottomans out of the city and during the same period, Ovanes Sovadzhian prevented the annihilation of the city. The first reported Red Army troops entered Pazardzhik on 23 September 1944. After 9 September 1944, the city grew to an industrial centre, which in 1947 during nationalisation, began consolidation of industrial enterprises. There were demonstrations consisting of about 5,000 protesters, demanding to change to democracy.

The economy of Pazardzhik is now a slowly growing one. GDP per capita is 9,101 BGN in 2012. The average monthly salary was 635 BGN and unemployment was 5.2% in 2015. The economy today is mainly based on agriculture, which also includes animal breeding. Farms are mainly located in the fertile land of the Upper Thracian Plain. The landmarks of the city are the clock tower, Church of the Dormition, which has a wood-carved iconstasis protected by UNESCO, the History Museum, the old post office, the Drama Theatre and others.

== Geography ==
=== Vegetation ===
The vegetation in and around the town is mainly broad-leaved species - oak, linden, poplar, chestnut, plane and less often coniferous species - mainly pine and fir. Willow, birch, ivy grow around the rivers.

The region is traditionally used for agriculture due to the favourable climate and fertile soils and is considered a recognised region for the cultivation of vegetables and fruit. Besides cereals, tomatoes, peppers, potatoes, watermelons, tobacco and wine, but also peaches, cherries and cotton are grown.

From the 15th century until the 1980s, Pazardzhik was a centre of Bulgarian rice cultivation, which was practised in the humid lowlands of the Upper Thracian Plain. The yellowish rice grains of Pazardzhik were well known and better appreciated than the rice grown around Plovdiv or further southeast along the Maritsa. Western visitors were amazed by the intensive rice culture and already in the 18th century spoke of the area as a "European Egypt" (in a travel diary from 1786.) Today, rice cultivation no longer plays a major role in the Pazardzhik region. After 1989, production was stopped or even abandoned (in most places) within a few years, as Bulgarian rice was no longer competitive on the world market.

=== Climate ===
Pazardzhik has a humid subtropical climate (Cfa) according to the Köppen climate classification and a considerable amount of humid continental climate and Mediterranean influence on the city. According to Batakliev's book about the region, the highest temperature ever recorded around 1921–1955 is 40.6 °C (105.1 °F) in July, while the lowest is −29.5 °C (−21.1 °F) in February. Mainly in June, July and August are shown to have higher temperatures in comparison with the other months. The coldest months are December, January and February, as shown in the climate table. The wettest months of the year are May and June, both above 58 mm.

Climate data for Pazardzhik, Bulgaria
Month	Jan	Feb	Mar	Apr	May	Jun	Jul	Aug	Sep	Oct	Nov	Dec	Year
Mean daily maximum °C (°F)	4.1 (39.4)	7.0 (44.6)	11.8 (53.2)	18.8 (65.8)	23.5 (74.3)	27.3 (81.1)	30.3 (86.5)	30.2 (86.4)	25.9 (78.6)	18.8 (65.8)	12.1 (53.8)	6.5 (43.7)	18 (64)
Daily mean °C (°F)	−0.2 (31.6)	2.2 (36.0)	6.1 (43.0)	12.2 (54.0)	16.9 (62.4)	20.6 (69.1)	22.9 (73.2)	22.5 (72.5)	18.2 (64.8)	12.3 (54.1)	7.2 (45.0)	2.2 (36.0)	11.9 (53.4)
Mean daily minimum °C (°F)	−3.9 (25.0)	−2.0 (28.4)	0.9 (33.6)	5.4 (41.7)	10.2 (50.4)	13.9 (57.0)	15.5 (59.9)	14.6 (58.3)	11.0 (51.8)	6.7 (44.1)	3.3 (37.9)	−1.1 (30.0)	6.2 (43.2)
Average precipitation mm (inches)	41 (1.6)	29 (1.1)	41 (1.6)	47 (1.9)	72 (2.8)	58 (2.3)	51 (2.0)	36 (1.4)	38 (1.5)	42 (1.7)	51 (2.0)	42 (1.7)	548 (21.6)
Source: Stringmeteo

Climate data for Pazardzhik, Bulgaria (1921-1955 for absolute temperatures, 1916-1955 for average, 1896-1945 for precipitation)
Month	Jan	Feb	Mar	Apr	May	Jun	Jul	Aug	Sep	Oct	Nov	Dec	Year
Record high °C (°F)	17.3 (63.1)	23.8 (74.8)	29.4 (84.9)	31.8 (89.2)	36.5 (97.7)	37.1 (98.8)	40.6 (105.1)	40.5 (104.9)	38.6 (101.5)	36.5 (97.7)	26.6 (79.9)	22.2 (72.0)	40.6 (105.1)
Daily mean °C (°F)	0.2 (32.4)	1.9 (35.4)	6.5 (43.7)	12.3 (54.1)	16.9 (62.4)	20.8 (69.4)	23.3 (73.9)	22.6 (72.7)	18.6 (65.5)	12.6 (54.7)	7.0 (44.6)	2.2 (36.0)	12.1 (53.8)
Record low °C (°F)	−27.5 (−17.5)	−29.5 (−21.1)	−19.6 (−3.3)	−4.0 (24.8)	1.0 (33.8)	4.8 (40.6)	7.5 (45.5)	5.8 (42.4)	−0.8 (30.6)	−5.5 (22.1)	−12.0 (10.4)	−21.5 (−6.7)	−29.5 (−21.1)
Average precipitation mm (inches)	27 (1.1)	31 (1.2)	35 (1.4)	48 (1.9)	58 (2.3)	62 (2.4)	47 (1.9)	33 (1.3)	31 (1.2)	43 (1.7)	40 (1.6)	41 (1.6)	515 (20.3)

== Etymology ==
The name Pazardzhik derives from Ottoman Turkish: پازارجق, romanized: Pazarcık (in Turkish: Pazarcık), literally meaning a "small market." Called Tatar Pazardzhik because the Qarā Tātārs settled there earlier in the town's history, its title thus signified, "small Tatar market". From the 15th-19th century, foreign travellers wrote the city's name as Pazardzhik, Bazardzhik, Tatar Pazardzhik, etc. Bulgarian written documents from the 19th century preferred Pazardzhik. It was also nicknamed The City of Rice before the Liberation. After 1934, the city changed its name officially to Pazardzhik.

Pazardzhik Point on Snow Island in the South Shetland Islands, Antarctica is named after Pazardzhik.

== History ==
=== Antiquity ===
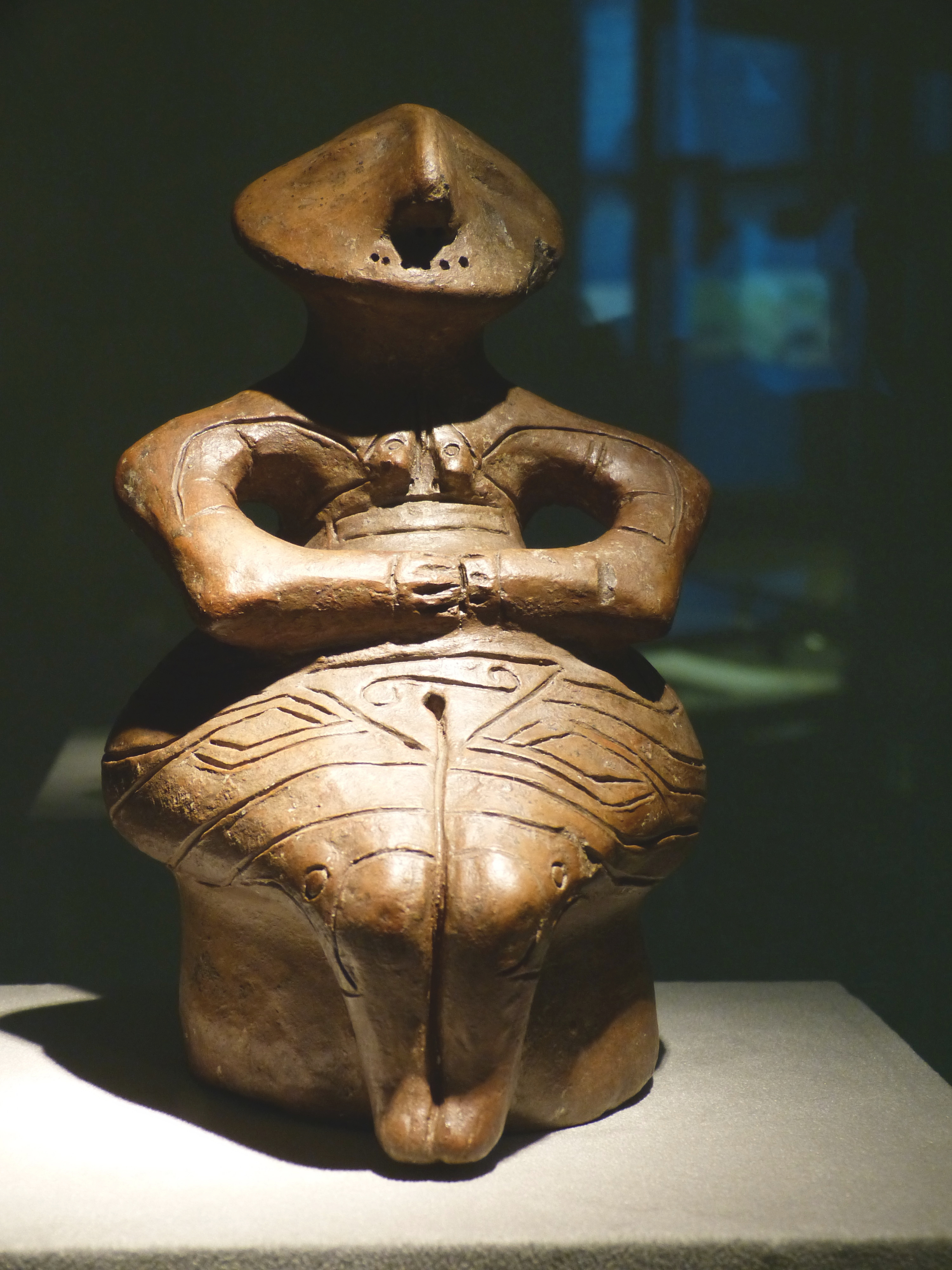
Pazardzhik Venus

The beginning of the pattern of civilisation brought by the Asia-Minor settlers in the second half of the 7th millennium BC has so far been judged on the basis of the early Neolithic finds from the Rakitovo settlement mound, which chronologically corresponds to the Karanovo I culture. The first known and discovered tribes in the city was in the Stone Age period, around the same time. They were agro-pastralists and founded a settlement from this era at the right shores of Maritsa, near Sinitovo and Pazardzhik. It continues until the 5th millennium BC during Chalcolithic period in the south, near the Besaparian hills. Another settlement was established in this period, at the today's railway station. It was destroyed due to the construction of the railroad Baronhirshova in 1876, the station and other structures around it in the beginning of the 20th century. A clay idol (named the Pazardzhik Venus) was found in 1872 and now is in the Natural History Museum in Vienna. It was made in the 5th millennium BC and is a clay figure of a seated woman. Near the city lived the Bessi tribe in the Iron Age, which their main city was Bessapara near the village Sinitovo and the ancient Roman road Via Militaris passed through it. Until 1920, was preserved a Thracian tombstone near the today's market in Pazardzhik. Northeast of it, an annular well was discovered, believed to be from an Thracian villa complex.

The Eneolithic culture is best represented by the layers of the Yunatsite settlement mound - its last period corresponds to the Karanovo VI culture. The development of the Late Neolithic culture was interrupted in the first centuries of the 4th millennium BC. - In the period from 3700 to 3300 BC, life in the settlement mounds ended. However, some finds from the mountain areas of the Rhodopes and Sredna Gora show that there was no 'hiatus' (interruption) between the Eneolithic and Early Bronze Age cultures, indicating that at least part of the lowland population of Pazardzhik seems to have retreated to the mountains.

=== Middle Ages ===
The Drougoubitai tribe settled here in the early Middle Ages. The region is incorporated in the First Bulgarian Empire during Omurtag's reign and also the battles of Malamir. Archaeological leads from the Second Bulgarian Empire were founded near the west of the city. In the left shores of Topolnitsa, fragments of sgraffito ceramics, iron shovel and sword were founded in 1926.

Disputes were made on when the city was established. According to research made by historian Stefan Zahariev concluded that Pazardzhik was first founded in 1395, where nomads from Saruhan settled under Bayezid I's orders. First and only, Zahariev implicates the nomads of Sarukhan in the founding of Pazardzhik. To answer the question of how and when the city was founded, Zahariev combines two different episodes in the history of the settlement of Thrace to create a 'story'. Three years later in 1398, according to the history of İbn-i Kemal, the city was founded by the migration of Tatars from Actav to Rumelia. Another claim according to Joseph von Hammer-Purgstall, an Austrian historian and orientalist, is about the establishment is during 1418, where the Minnet Bey and the Tatars from Isquilip, which resettled due to Mehmed I. Mehmed, after taking Samsun, passed through Isquilip and takes punitive measures against Minnet Bey. The reason for this, although presented by Aşıkpaşazadeh in the form of a dialogue, is explicitly stated in the source - Minnet Bey deviated from the campaign to which he had been called. The entire group of Tatars was taken to Rumelia and settled in Konush, where Minnetoglu Mehmed Bey built an imaret and a caravanserai and enlivened the surrounding area. Some facts in the narrative require special attention. According to the contrast of Balkanski, the resettled Tatars belonged to the Samagar tribe and Minnetoglu Bey is portrayed as the executor of the Sultan's will. The leader of the deported Tatars was Minnet Bey and they most likely appeared as part of Timur's forces in the Isquilip region, a fact reported only by the "anonymous". The identity of Minnet Bey has not been fully clarified in historiography. The fourth claim and the preferred one is the city's establishment from the resettled Crimean Tatar people by the Ottoman Sultan Bayezid II's campaign on Kiliia and Akkerman according to the Dutch professor Machiel Kiel. The Tatars settled there in 1485, where the local villages held an annual market and their leadership was entrusted to their leader Sar-Khan Bey, who in turn settled in the depopulated village of Zagorovo, from which Sarukhanbehlu (today Septemvri) emerged. According to Zahariev, a historian from Pazardzhik, the first Tatar settlers were united in the mahalla Hadzha Kalach, which also built the first mosque in the town. It became a town in 1488.

Pazardzhik developed in the years from its foundation in 1398 to the time of the earliest Ottoman register available in 1472. According to the register, by the year it was put together, the town had roughly 105 Muslim homes and was a completely Muslim town. Within a period of less than eighty years, Tatar Pazardzhik was already included as a town in the Ottoman cadastre - eloquent testimony to its highly successful development. It is safe to assume that only a few years after its foundation, Pazardzhik, like a number of other settlements in Thrace, was severely shaken by the civil war between the Ottoman sons of Sultan Bayezid I. In the 1530s, an intensification of rice cultivation began in Thrace, directly affecting the immediate vicinity of Pazardzhik. According to the accounts of Hoca Sadeddin Efendi, in this case taken directly from Idris Bitlisi, rice cultivation was introduced in the region as early as the time of Lala Şahin Pasha, but according to the authoritative opinion of Inaljik, the intensification and expansion of rice cultivation in the Plovdiv region can only take place during the reign of Mehmed II. This is confirmed by the reports of the construction of the city of Plovdiv by Hadım Şehabeddin until the mid-15th century.

=== Early Modern ===
A part of the Tatars left Pazardzhik and its surroundings and those who remained in the city turned their backs completely on nomadism and turned to agriculture or handicrafts - a fact reported by Ibn Kemal, who probably described the situation as he knew it in the 1580s. Within a few decades these changes breathed vital force into the new settlement, and in the second half of the 16th century the first mosque was built, attracting settlers and craftsmen, and the village took on the characteristic features of a kasbah of the time. Unlike neighbouring Philibe (Plovdiv), whose urban planning depended entirely on the sultan and local senior administrators, Pazardzhik attracted the attention and active support of influential Akıncı families. Among the builders of public buildings in the city are the names of Evrenosoglu, who promoted the construction of the city's imaret, the influential Malkoçoğlu Bali Bey, who built the Pirzade Curve near Pazardzhik, to Kadı Ishak Çelebi from Bitola, who built one of the city's mosques. The influence of nearby Ihtiman, completely dominated by the powerful Akinji clan of Mihalovtsi, is also important. In the 17th and 18th centuries, the town flourished as a port and warehouse on the river Maritsa, storing grain, wine, rice and timber from the Rhodope Mountains, as well as storing iron from Samokov. The river was used as a water route for transporting goods on rafts to Adrianople and Constantinople.

In 1718 Gerard Kornelius Drish visited Pazardzhik and wrote "the buildings here according to construction, size and beauty stand higher than those of Niš, Sofia and all other places". In 1738 the population of Pazardzhik was predominantly Turkish. On 2 June 1810, Count Nikolay Kamensky invaded the town with 14,000 soldiers, 4,300 cavalry, and around 160 guns (12 foot batteries and 2 horse batteries). The town was seized after a brief siege and a tremendous attack, for which Kamensky's regiment received the silver Bazardzhik (Pazardzhik) medal, which was worn on St. George ribbons.

In the mid-19th century, Pazardzhik was an important craft and trade centre with a population of about 25,000. Some mahallas emerged in the town, one of them being Chiksalan. There were two large annual fairs and a large market on Tuesdays and Wednesdays. There was a post office and a telegraph. The town also developed into an important cultural centre during this period, as the first school in the town, which was taught Bulgarian alongside Greek, was opened by bishop Dionysius in 1823, a class school was opened in 1847, a girls' school in 1848, a community centre in 1862 and the women's union Prosveta in 1870, which regularly organized lectures. In the course of the Tanzimat reforms of 1834, a Bulgarian congregation was able to form, which in 1837 had the Church of the Dormition built with its carved altar wall, the work of masters of the famous Debar school. Stefan Zahariev reports that the city was divided into 33 mahallas in the 1860s. At that time there were 3420 houses, 1200 shops, 19 mosques, 6 churches, 1 synagogue and 4 public baths. There were also 8 Turkish and 6 Bulgarian schools, as well as a Jewish, a Vlach and an Armenian school. In 1848 the town had around 600 schoolboys. It was reported in 1854 that the local government in Pazardzhik taxed people, including those who passed by and entered. In 1870, the Makedoniya newspaper provided a description of the social life in Pazardzhik:

The public life in this town is fairly developed. The urbanites hold soirées with balls. You will see dames and gentlemen—dressed in the latest fashion with a brilliant luxury of silk and brocade frocks—dancing polka and mazurka. They are very fond of visits on Sundays and holidays. Therefore, this is a very good custom, because it softens the manners, and, indeed, we can meet many polite and easy-going people in this town.

— Makedoniya, 1870

Bela Erody wrote the following in the Hungarian weekly newspaper Vasarnapi Ujsag on 5 March 1876 regarding women in the areas of Pazardjik and Plovdiv,: "Near [Pazardzhik], we saw [women] plowing, sowing, cutting, and gathering hay [alongside] males. They did their job always in a good disposition, singing [folk] songs and making jokes."

Vasil Levski appointed the revolutionary committee in Pazardzhik as the second district centre in Bulgaria in 1872. In 1876 Georgi Benkovski resumed the activity of the Pazardzhik revolutionary committee. The town was planned to be burnt down like other settlements that experienced it during the April Uprising. In Pazardzhik—а strong stronghold of Ottoman power—an uprising could not take place. The Ottoman garrisons in town instilled fear in the local activists, many of whom were rich people. The plan to burn down the town and cut the railway line was not carried out. Thus, the Ottoman authorities had a large superiority of forces already at the beginning of the uprising.

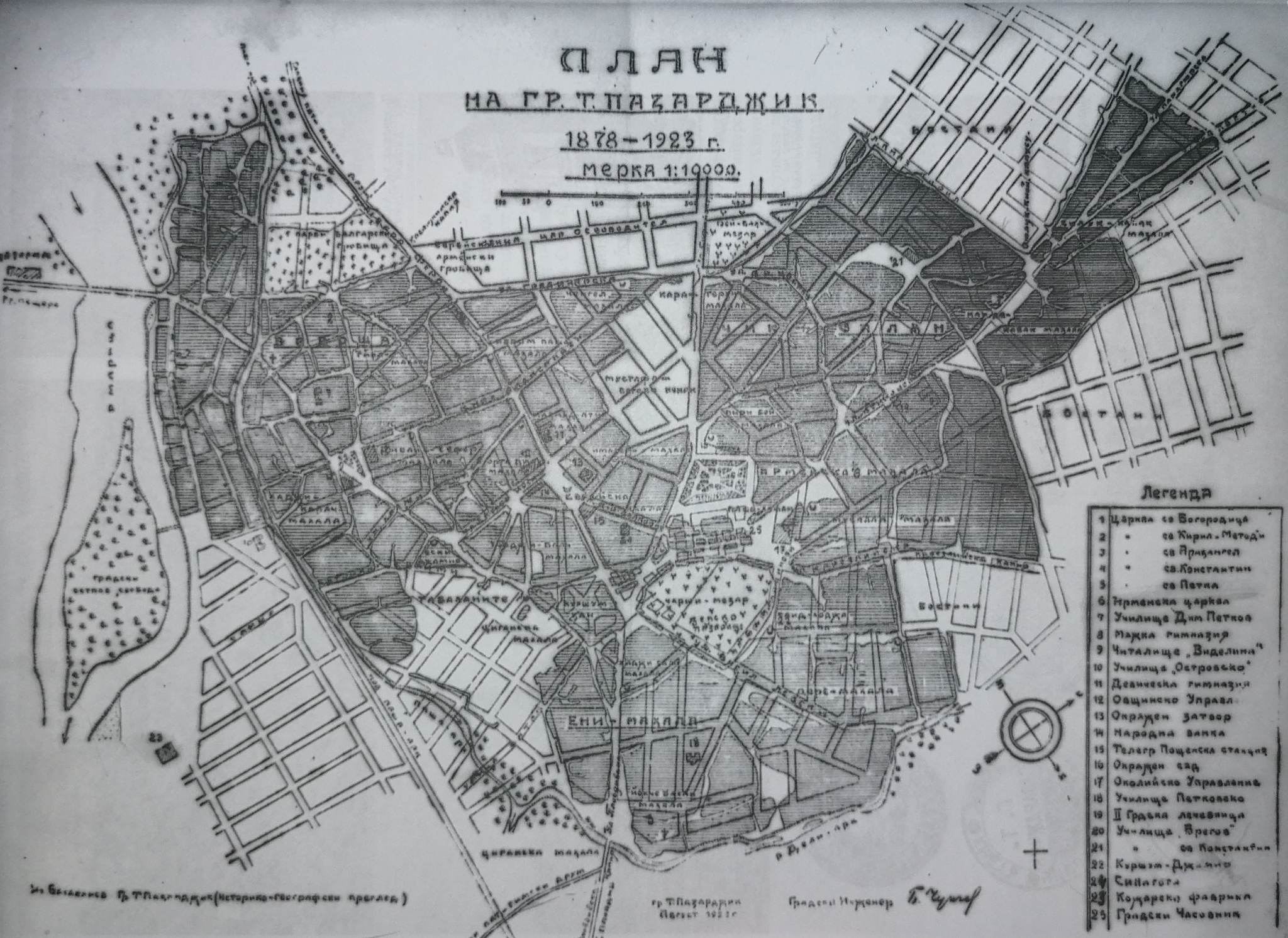
City plan of Tatar Pazardzhik (Pazardzhik), 1878-1923

At the end of the Russo-Turkish War (1877–1878), the Imperial Russian Army under the command of Lieutenant General Iosif Gurko continued to be present in the areas of Bulgaria that had been wrested from Ottoman rule. The Zapdniya detachment of Russian troops stationed in Pazardzhik was withdrawn on 14 January 1878. Unlike many other Bulgarian towns where massacres occurred during or after the war, unprotected Pazardzhik was spared planned depredation. Elsewhere along the Maritsa, the Ottoman commander Süleyman Hüsnü Pasha had burned down several settlements and killed or mistreated the inhabitants. A group of young Jews organised a vigilante group in the town in order to protect the possessions of Bulgarian families that have fled and their own, as well as to defend the remaining population from violent attacks by the bashi-bazouk. A fire brigade was also established under the leadership of Gabriel Seliktar; their task was to extinguish fires in Bulgarian and Jewish houses and shops. The town was planned to be burnt down like other settlements that experienced it during the April Uprising. The Armenian-born telegraphist Ovanes Sovadzhiyan saved the town from total annihilation. The ciphered order arrived at the station's telegraph office while the Turkish military were in Sovadzhiyan's office. Risking his life, he interpreted the telegram in the opposite sense. Namely, that the city and its inhabitants should be spared. To avoid scrutiny, Sovadzhiyan swallowed the printed text of the original message. After some time, the Russian troops entered the city, which was saved from destruction by an Armenian.

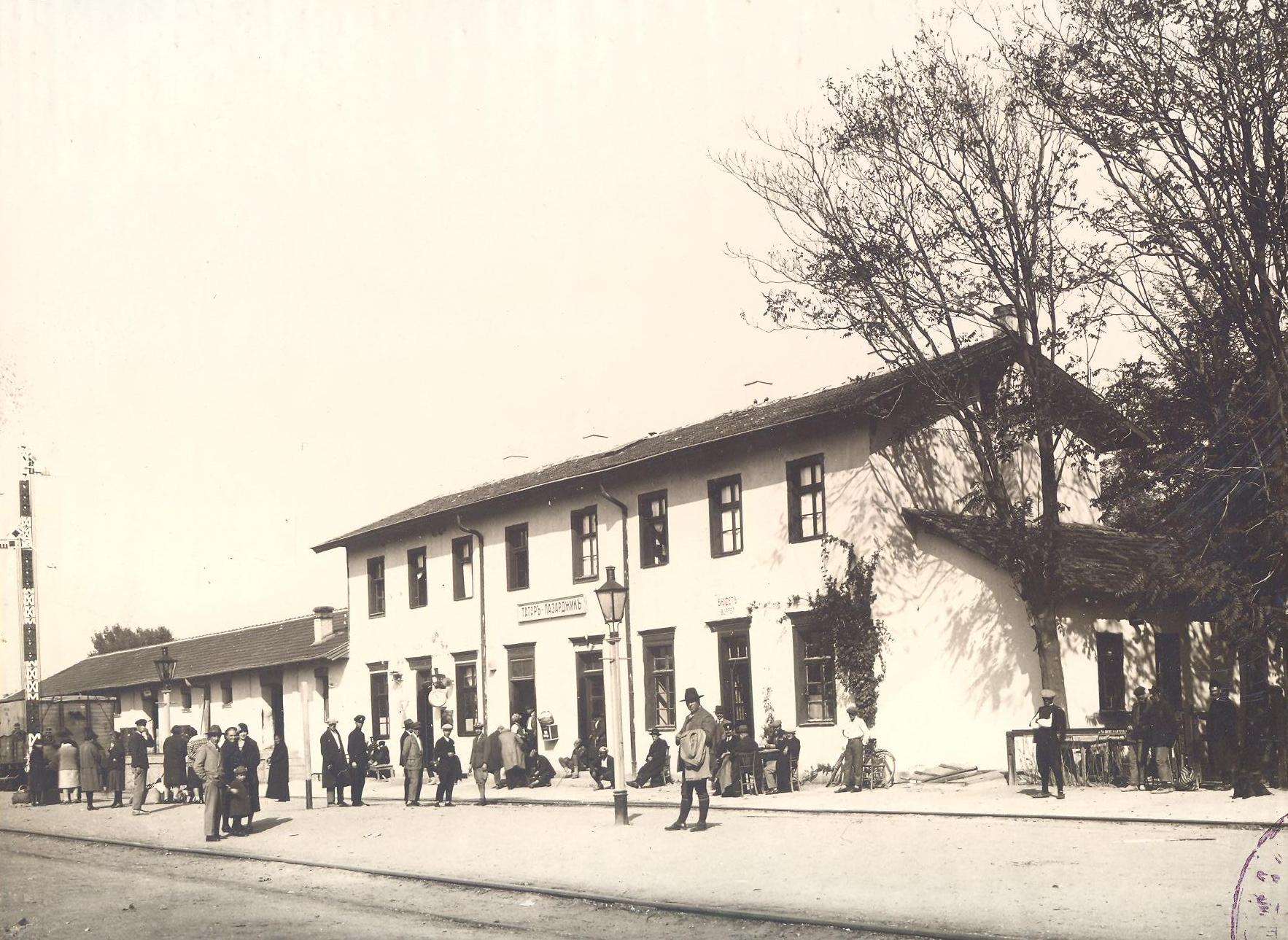
The railway station in 1928

=== Modern history ===
In 1904, there was a fire in the city, which burnt down more than 300 workshops and commercial buildings. Handicraft was practiced in the early 20th century, such as the production of aba, haberdashery and coppersmithing. There were many factories such as for tobacco, food products, walnut and sesame oil.

The famous British travel writer Patrick Leigh Fermor visited Pazardzhik in the late summer of 1934, according to his book The Broken Road. During the 1934 Bulgarian coup d'état, which overthrew Mushanov's cabinet by Kimon Georgiev's Zveno and the Military Union, saw being replaced Mihail Trendafilov with Georgi Kenderov as mayor of Pazardzhik and also Lyubomir Levicharov as deputy mayor.

Bulgaria's participation in the final stage of World War II was conditioned by circumstances reflecting national and international interest. On 17 September 1944, an agreement was reached that the newly formed Bulgarian People's Army. The first reported Soviet troops entered Pazardzhik on 23 September 1944. From the autumn of 1944 until the summer of 1946, troops from the 9th Artillery Division, commanded by Major-General Andrei Ratov, were stationed in the town, and the division's headquarters were located in Plovdiv. Near Glavinitsa in the winter of 1944 the aviation unit was deployed. The Soviet command in Pazardzhik was headed by Dmitry Gorunkov and assistants - Nikolai Pavlovich Ugryumov and Vasily Feodorovich Bezhanov. After 9 September 1944, the city grew to an industrial centre, which in 1947 during nationalisation, began consolidation of industrial enterprises. The leading sectors of the economy were food and beverages, machinery and metals, chemical, electronics, production of accumulators, etc. In 1960 was established a factory for accumulators, one of the biggest ones in Bulgaria. In 1981 49,7% of the industrial products in the okrug were produced in the town. Pazardzhik had 72 industrial enterprises and the cooperatives are also developed. After 1989, the process of state ownership in its various forms began. Conditions were made for the development of private-owned agriculture enterprises.

The special camp "C" was established. It was a secret concentration camp, organized secretly and illegally, about which only the head of the State's Security and Georgi Dimitrov knew about. It was housed in the old prison, and was run by the Counterintelligence Department II of the State Security. It was intended for persons captured on the border, but from the very beginning many IMRO activists were also sent. According to testimonies, they were killed with iron rods by groups of executioners. By 1950, 137 people were sent to Camp C, of whom 65 died. The camp was closed on 20 November 1950, and the survivors were sent to the Belene camp. Eight people, "because they knew everything that was going on in the camp", were left without sentences "forever in Pazardzhik prison", but they too were transferred to Belene in June 1952. Approximately 600 prisoners were behind bars in 1952, which were forced to work on hydroelectric power stations on the Maritsa.

In Bulgaria, there were instances of violent resistance against minorities. In 1971, there were riots in Pazardzhik, during which two Communist Party officials were reportedly killed. The authorities replied by detaining a huge number of individuals. Two Pomaks were sentenced to death, and two others to 15 years in prison. A group of Pomaks traveled to Sofia to oppose these measures, but were stopped by the militia near the town of Samokov, where two Pomaks were killed and 50 injured in a violent battle.

A demonstration of more than 5,000 people in Pazardzhik was organized by the independent associations in December 1989 with demands for the abolition of the monopoly of the Communist Party's power, a change in the electoral law, the release of political prisoners, the legalization of independent groups and the removal of the Penal Code for anti-government agitation. Eight years later, in 1997 it was reported that the police attacked the Roma neighbourhood Iztok and killed three gypsies.

On 27 April 2016, the Pazardjik municipality council became the first in Bulgaria to outlaw the burqa, followed by Stara Zagora on 28 April, Sliven on 25 May, and Burgas on 1 June. In May 2016, the first fine was imposed on a lady in Pazardzik. The number of fined women grew in subsequent months.

== Demographics ==
Historical population
Year	Pop.	±%
1887	15,659	—
1910	18,098	+15.6%
1934	23,228	+28.3%
1946	30,376	+30.8%
1956	39,499	+30.0%
1965	55,430	+40.3%
1975	65,727	+18.6%
1985	77,340	+17.7%
1992	82,578	+6.8%
2001	78,855	−4.5%
2011	71,979	−8.7%
2021	55,716	−22.6%
Source: Censuses

In the 1880s, the population of Pazardzhik numbered about 15,000, making it one of the largest in Bulgaria. Since then, the town grew decade by decade, mainly due to immigrants from the rural areas and surrounding smaller towns, reaching its peak in 1985–1992 with over 80,000 inhabitants. Thereafter, as a result of the poor economic situation in the Bulgarian provinces in the 1990s, the population began to shrink, leading to a new exodus towards the national capital Sofia and abroad. In February 2011, the city had 71,979 inhabitants, while the Pazardzhik Municipality has 114,817 inhabitants.

=== Ethnic linguistic and religious composition ===
According to the latest 2011 census data, the individuals declared their ethnic identity were distributed as follows:

	Number	Percentage
Total	71,979	100
Bulgarians	57,332	86.3
Turks	4,822	7.3
Romani	3,423	5.2
Others	325	0.5
Indefinable	495	0.7
Undeclared	5,582	7.8

In the 18th and early 19th centuries, the all-Bulgarian districts of Kavlakkavak and Syulyukkavak were established. According to some accounts, by the mid-19th century the city consisted of 33 neighbourhoods - 18 Turkish, 12 Bulgarian and 3 Gypsy. Although the Bulgarian neighbourhoods were smaller in number, they were more densely populated, while the Turkish neighbourhoods also had Bulgarians. In 1865, the city's population was 25,000, with Bulgarians making up 57% and Turks 28.5%. As a trading city, the city was attractive to other peoples, and so significant minorities of Jews, Armenians and other peoples remained in the city for decades, and they are still present today, although in much smaller numbers. Sephardic Jews were probably in the city as early as 1492. About 10% of the 17,000 inhabitants were Jewish when Jews had a monopoly in the trading and distribution of grain. Some Aromanian families also live in Pazardzhik.

== Governance and international relations ==
The municipal administration consists of a mayor, a deputy mayor and a secretary. The mayor of Pazardzhik is the head of the city's administration. The previous mayor was Todor Popov, who is a part of the local coalition "Novoto Vreme", who won his first election in 2007 and subsequently served second, third and currently fourth consecutive terms in 2011, 2015 and 2019. Afterwards, Petar Kulenski, a part of the political party We Continue the Change, won the 2023 elections with 3000 votes ahead of Popov and became incumbent mayor as of 2023.

The mayor is a branch in the administration, which includes an Internal Audit Department, Financial Controller, Deputy Mayor, Data Security Officer and a department ''Mayor's Office''. The secretary is divided into 7 directorates - Legal and Administrative Services, Civil Registration of population, European funds, strategic planning and digital services, Education and culture, Budget and municipal property, Architecture and spartial planning and Construction, transport, environment.

=== Twin towns – sister cities ===
Pazardzhik is twinned with:

- Aerodrom (Skopje), North Macedonia
- Chekhov, Russia
- Salerno, Italy
- Al-Salt, Jordan
- Stavropol, Russia
- Thái Bình, Vietnam
- West Bend, United States

== Economy and infrastructure ==
=== Economy ===
Leading sectors in the economy according to their net sales revenue in 2012
1. Commerce (40.0%)
2. Manufacturing (32.0%)
3. Construction (6.00%)
4. Transport (5.00%)
5. Healthcare (2.00%)
6. Other (15.0%)

The economy of Pazardzhik began from the 15th century, when it was still a small town and a market place. It began to form as an important trade centre in the Ottoman Empire. In the 17th-18th century, the town was the primary centre of crafts within the empire. There were many crafts practised, including leatherworking (clothing and footwear from leather) forging metal, etc. After the Liberation, there was a large change in the rural life of Pazardzhik. The main aspect of the economy was agriculture, which included the production of rice and cereals. Factories were built, including for the production of Marseille tiles in 1908 and pottery in 1914. Pazardzhik's economy grew in 1920-1944 period, as it included the electrification of the city in 1922. In 1938, there were 18 industry enterprises and in 1944, that number grew to 54. During the nationalisation of the Bulgarian economy in 1947, all of the industries were consolidated. New buildings in the 1960s and 1970s were built for the huge industries. According to a CIA report in 1952 a labourer made 16 BGN per day, whilst bank clerks and directors made 500–600 and 800 BGN per month respectively. During this period, Pazardzhik was considered a large industrial centre, with whole trade complexes and streets springing up in the 1970s, but in the 1980s, after the loss of Russian markets, the city's economy was in despair. Living standards fell by 40%. After 1989, new modern industries appeared. The industries in 1993 were 293, but increased to 424 in 2008.

Distribution of unemployment by age in 2014
1. Unemployed aged over 50 (43.0%)
2. Unemployed aged 40-49 (21.0%)
3. Unemployed aged 30-39 (21.0%)
4. Youth aged 29 or lower (15.0%)

Pazardzhik Municipality's economy in the performance of the province decreased after 2009. GDP per capita was 9,101 BGN in 2012, twice below the national average (18,382 BGN) and 18% lower than that of the province (10,315 BGN). It is the result of the general economic situation and low competitiveness. The average monthly salary was 635 BGN and unemployment was 5.2% in 2015. As of 31 May 2014, according to the data of the Directorate "Labour Office", 4 008 people were unemployed. In the period January–May 2014, the number of people who entered employment were 1175 people, of which 153 people (13%) were long-term unemployed. Women were 59% unemployed, while men were 41% unemployed. The unemployment rate increased to 5.7% in 2017. Activity rates were an estimated 49.8%.

The economy today is mainly based on agriculture. Farms are mainly located in the fertile land of the Upper Thracian Plain, where vegetables are grown - tomatoes, peppers, etc. Fruit is also grown, especially peaches and cherries. Pamid grapes are also grown around the area, which is used to make the wine Trakia. Industry on the territory of Pazardzhik is the dominant sector in economy. Weaknesses include the loss of foreign markets in recent years, the depreciation of machinery, and the weak management capacity of local businesses, which are easily squeezed out by foreign competitors. The textiles industry, which was one of the largest dominant industries a few years ago, is currently in a poor state and enterprises rely on toll manufacturing, which deprives the market of quality goods from Bulgarian production brands. Construction in the municipality is widely represented by a large number of companies. There are natural resources underpinning the extraction of raw materials for the sector. In the sectoral distribution of expenditure on the acquisition of fixed capital assets, the largest share of manufacturing and the production and distribution of electricity and heat and gaseous fuels. Construction at the beginning of the period before the 2008 financial crisis also had a higher share, but in 2012, expenditure on acquisition of fixed capital in this economic activity decreased by almost 2 times.

=== Transportation ===
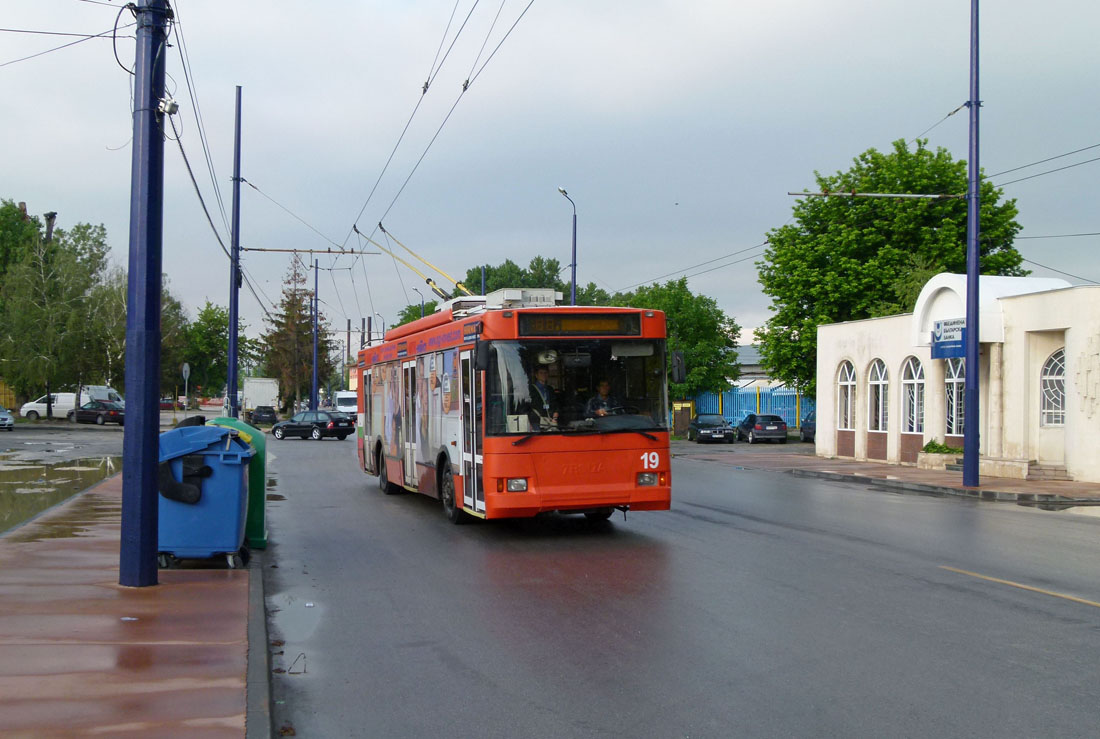
An operating trolleybus in 2012.

The main transportation for the city are trolleybuses, buses, taxis and trains.

The trolleybus network in Pazardzhik is one of the main transportation covering 2/3 of the city. It first opened on 1 June 1993. The trolleybus lines are 6 (1, 1E, 2, 2E, 4, 5) and have designated routes. The length is 30 km (19 mi), which is one-way. The total passenger buses are 23, 6 of them are articulated buses. The bus transport network in Pazardzhik consists of 16 lines (1, 2, 2А, 3А, 6, 7, 10, 13, 13А, 14, 14A) covering the most important areas of the city.

Pazardzhik is near the Trakia motorway and is on the I-8 road. The city connects with the major hub city Plovdiv and is 7 km away from the highway. The Pan-European Corridor VIII passes through, connecting it with cities such as Skopje. There are intercity buses which connect many cities and also countries like Greece. Pazardzhik has 62,003 cars per 1000 people and around 26 people die in road accidents per 10000 people in 2011 according to the Eurostat.

=== Education ===
Educational level of the population of Pazardzhik
1. Secondary Education (41.0%)
2. Higher Education (16.0%)
3. Primary Education (24.0%)
4. Elementary Education (11.0%)
5. Incomplete Elementary Education (6.00%)
6. No formal education (2.00%)

The education after 9 September 1944 also imposed changes in the field of the educational system. Entrance examinations in high schools were abolished and poor pupils were exempted from fees. The reconstruction of education in the 1950s was carried out entirely on the concept of Marxism and Soviet education. On the initiative of the municipal government, with the active participation of mass organizations and the voluntary labor of the population, major and partial renovation of existing school buildings is carried out and the construction of new ones begins. In 1954 the number of pupils in all primary schools was 7,275. In 1959, the processes of reconstruction of the school in the direction of its polytechnicisation began. School workshops for labour training were built in primary and junior high schools and in the secondary schools classrooms for mechanical engineering, electrical engineering and agriculture, and experimental fields and sections were set up.

Educational levels of Pazardzhik are relatively high. Around 57% of the population have had secondary, or higher education. In comparison, Pazardzhik Province has 52.7% highly educated population, while Yuzhen Tsentralen Planning Region has around 57.1% of highly educated. According to the European Roma Rights Centre in 2002–2003, Pazardzhik had segregated education of the Romani people, specifically in the Iztok neighbourhood, which has two schools: one for 1–4th grade and 5–8th grade. Many Roma students drop out after the 4th grade, while the rest enter the second school.

In Pazardzhik there are 2 higher educational institutions (University Agricultural College and College for Primary Pedagogues) and a branch of the Plovdiv University "Paisii Hilendarski", 4 elementary, 7 primary, 4 secondary schools, 10 specialized high schools, 1 interschool center for vocational training after 6th and 7th grade, and one children's complex for extracurricular forms.

=== Healthcare ===
Healthcare here after the Liberation of Bulgaria was limited. There were lack of doctors and pharmacists in the area and no available hospitals. Many doctors and pharmacists, studied in different locations, came here in the mid-19th century. Russian troops after liberating the town in the Russo-Turkish War (1877–1878), established the first hospital ''Saint Pantaleimon''. In 1928, the hospital gained investments from national foundations in Bulgaria. Ivan Sokolov was a prominent doctor working in the hospital. He created the first private hospital in the town. After 1948, hospital work expanded, as outpatient examinations increased, and the number of qualified staff were growing. From 1 January 1959, by decision of the Ministry of Health and Social Welfare, the hospital became a district hospital directly subordinate to it. From 1979 to 1990 the District Clinical Hospital became a training base for students of the Higher Medical Institute in Pazardzhik.

In modern times Pazardzhik has a well-developed health care network, both in outpatient and inpatient care. According to the data of the Regional Health Inspectorate - Pazardzhik, as of June 2014, there are 5 multiprofile hospitals on the territory of the municipality, all of them in Pazardzhik. In comparison there are 12 hospitals in the province. After passing accreditation in November 2013, the number of hospital beds as of 1 January 2014 are 434.

== Culture ==
=== Pedestrian zones ===
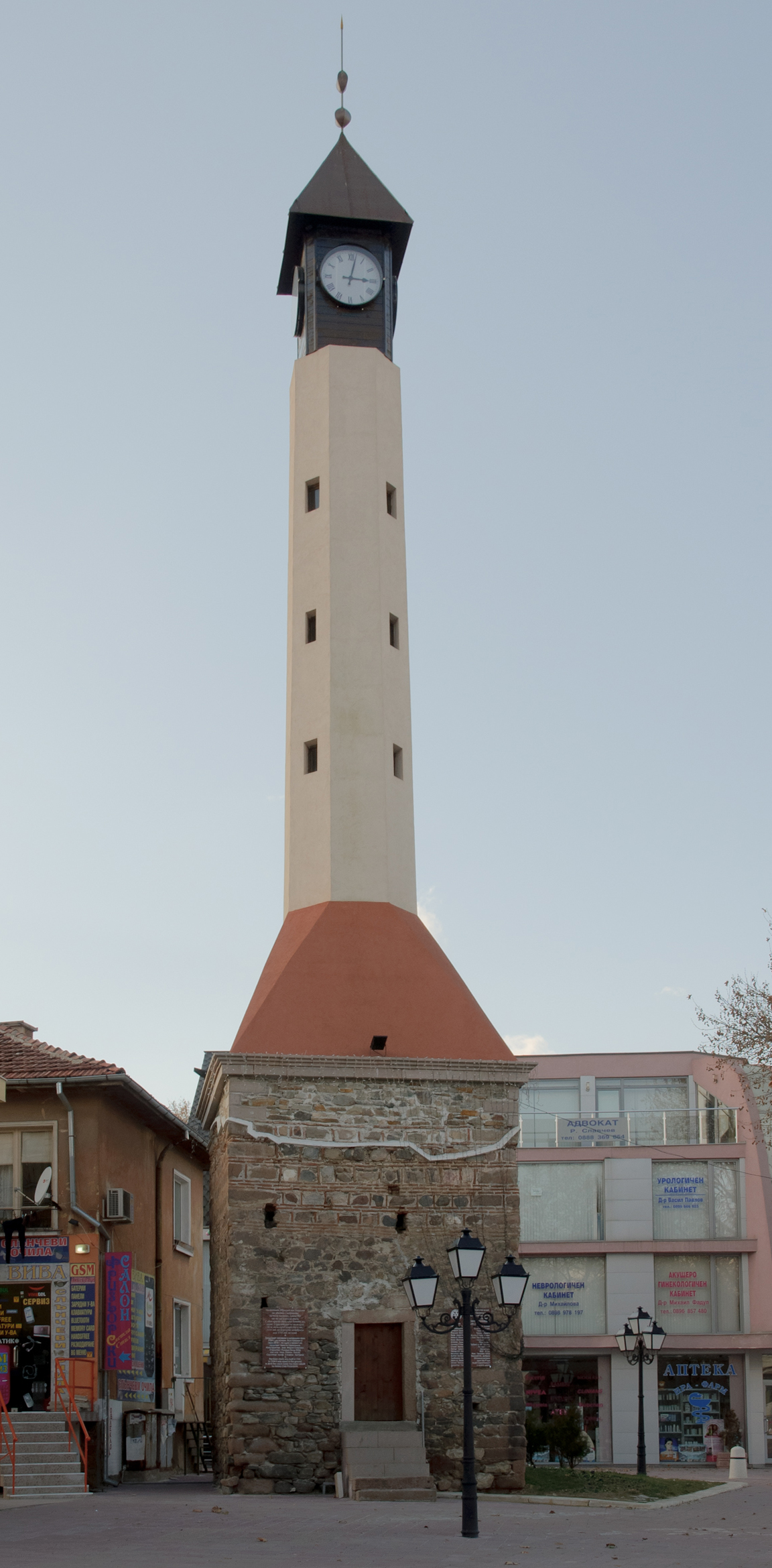
The old clock tower is one of the many landmarks in the city.

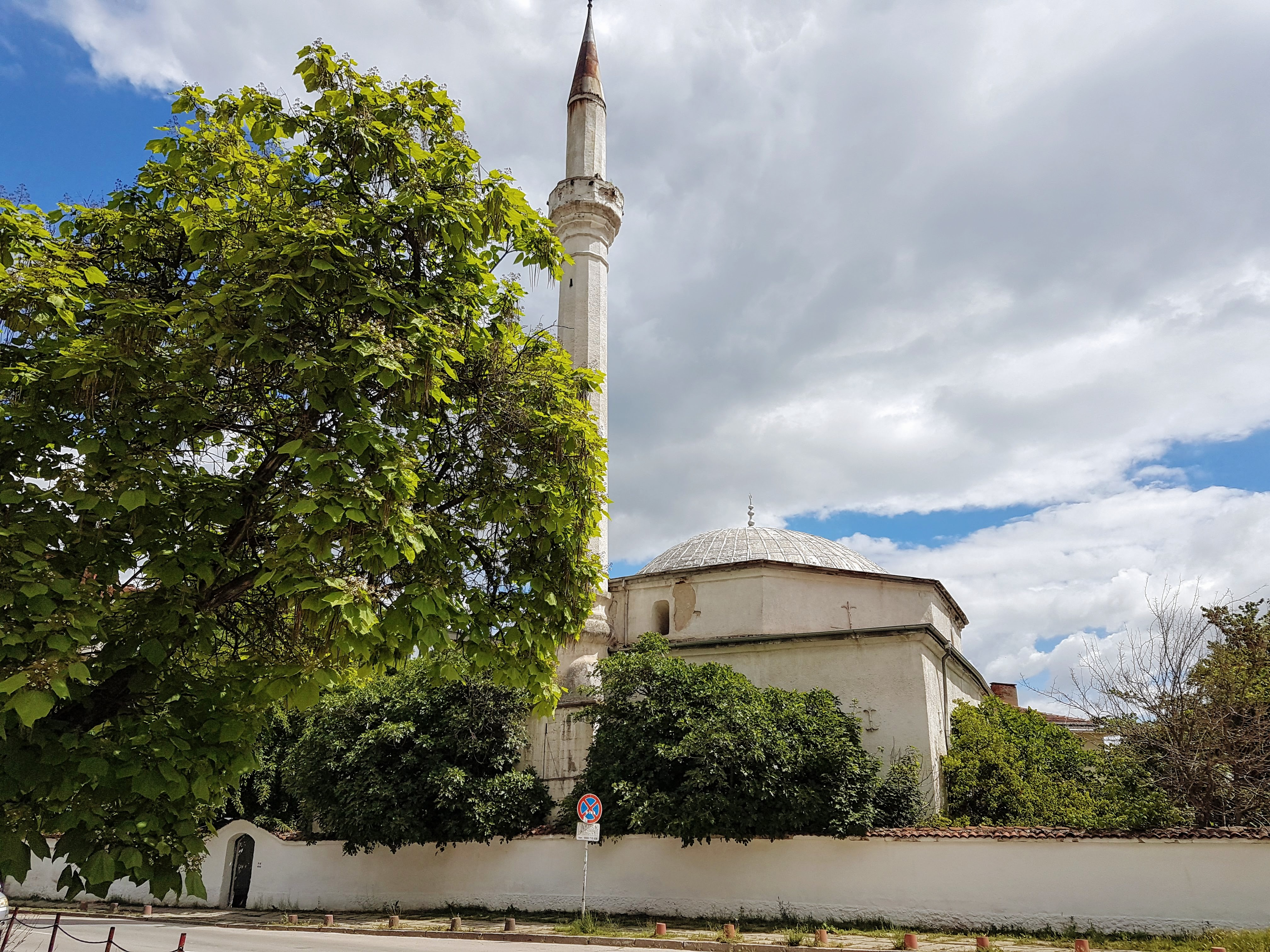
Kurshum Mosque is one of the only surviving Ottoman architecture buildings in Pazardzhik

The first pedestrian street in Pazardzhik is "Dimitar Petkov", which was constructed in 1976. There was a project implemented by nine companies from Sofia, Varna and Plovdiv, which they allocated around 9.6 million BGN between October 2009 and October 2011, which included rehabilitation, restoration of public recreation areas such as parks, green areas, including the installation of benches, gazebos, restoration of fountains, fountains, statues, monuments, and other elements of urban furniture; reconstruction, rehabilitation of walkways and sidewalks, pedestrian areas; introduction of energy-saving street lighting; and implementation of measures to increase security and prevent crime, such as the installation of lights. In 2018 the Municipal Council banned the riding of bikes in pedestrian zones, walkways, and gardens, unless these places have dedicated and marked cycle lanes. Since April 2024 actions are being taken against improper parking of cars, particularly those that are out of use and abandoned in public spaces in order to free up the pavements, green areas and land around bus stops and junctions.

Island-park ''Svoboda'' is a pedestrian area, where people can walk freely. The park includes a football field, a basketball court in a stadium and also different sport areas. In 2009, a zoo was established, where various animals are kept. There is a lion, tigers, llamas, raccoons, horse and others. There is a monument of Aleko Konstantinov, and an iron cross which was built in 2005. There are other parks, such as "Piskovets" and "Stadiona." The most recent park is the "Garden of the World", which serves as a purpose to preserve rare species of plants.

=== Architecture ===
Architecture in Pazardzhik have developed since its founding in the 13th century. The first houses were constructed at the river Maritsa, as the first mahalla is registered. Kurshum Khan was built in the 16th century, which was considered one of the gracious examples of the Ottoman architecture in the town. Its successor is the infamous Kurshum Mosque, which is one of the only examples of this legacy in Pazardzhik. In 1652, Evliya Çelebi visited Pazardzhik, to his words that it was a rich city with 16 mahallas, 870 one and two-storey houses.

During the Bulgarian National Revival, architecture began to thrive. Many squares were constructed, one of them was square Vasil Levski and Konak na kaimakamina (today Saedinenie). In the 19th century, Pazardzhik was one of the biggest cities in European Ottoman, with 33 mahallas, 3420 houses and also many public buildings. The Bratsigovo Architectural School was one of the main supplier of architects that designed the house-museums such as the house-museum of Nikolaki Hristovich (today used as an ethnographic exhibition), the house-museum of Stanislav Dospevski (today used as an art gallery) and others. The Church of the Dormition was built in the period 1836-1837 and followed by many other churches, including the Church of St Constantine and Helena, built between 1868 and 1870.

During the Russo-Turkish War (1877–1878), Turks left the town and many buildings were left abandoned or demolished. In 1883, a city plan was developed. Many public buildings were built during this period, including the regional court and Chitalishte Videlina. In the first years after the Liberation, small changes were made in building houses. They were a bit higher, as well as the roofs were without any boards. During the years until 1944, many streets were enlarged, as well as new modern buildings and hotels were built.

During socialism in Bulgaria, the first cooperative apartment buildings were built. The industrial zone in the southern part of the city was established with large industries. The drama theatre, hotel ''Trakia'', ''Mineralni bani'' were constructed.

After 1989, where in this period the fall of communism happened, architectural and construction plans completely changed. The new plans were linked to the nature, which allowed many parks to be made. Four star Hotel Hebar was constructed with 48 rooms, considered the newest hotel in the city.

=== Sports ===
In the Pazardzhik History Museum, the items, documents and photos exhibited there tell about the development of the individual sports: cycling, football, swimming, weightlifting, wrestling, modern pentathlon, athletics, rhythmic gymnastics, volleyball, etc. The main sports of the city are volleyball and football, as they have a professional men's volleyball team called VC Hebar Pazardzhik and a football team, FC Hebar Pazardzhik. There are other minor sports such as basketball and wrestling. Sport arenas and stadiums in the city include the stadium Georgi Benkovski and an indoor arena ''Vasil Levski'', the home arena for the city's volleyball club.

Pazardzhik co-hosted the 1981 Men's European Volleyball Championship with Varna and Burgas.

Pazardzhik became the European City of Sports in 2020. It was inspected by the special commission of ACES Europe, in which it met the criteria. Tax cuts were made on families with children practising sports.

== Museums and theatres ==
=== Drama and Puppet Theatre Konstantin Velichkov ===
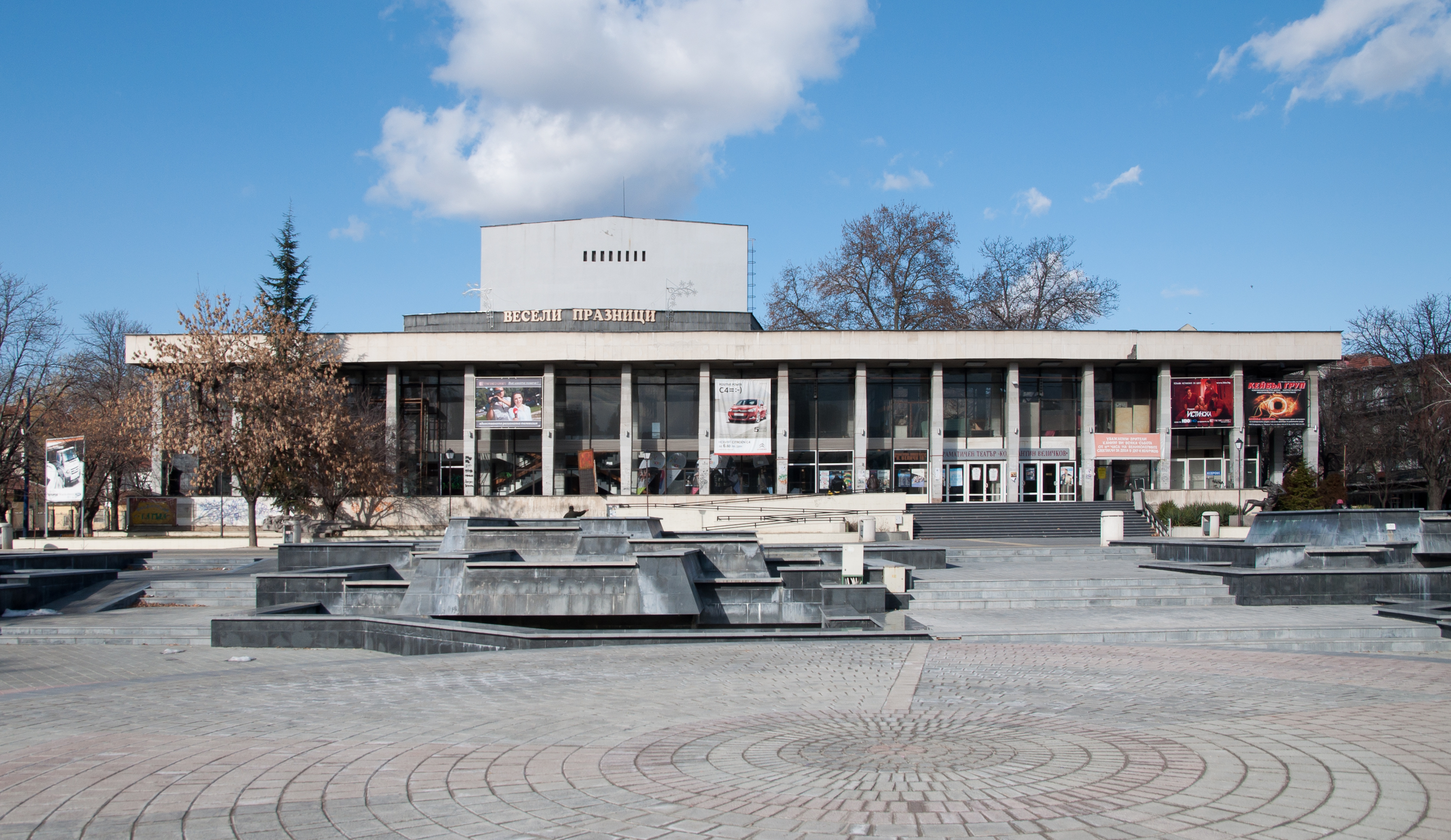
The Pazardzhik theatre named Konstantin Velichkov.

The city is home to one of the oldest theatres in the country, built with funds raised voluntarily by citizens. Today the theatre is united with the puppet theatre under the name Drama and Puppet Theatre Konstantin Velichkov after the Bulgarian writer, Konstantin Velichkov.

The theatre has a big 470-seat auditorium and a 100-seat chamber hall. The theatre stages titles from world classic, from the Bulgarian classical literary heritage and from the contemporary national and foreign dramaturgy. It also presents its plays not only on home stage, but across the country.

The theatre was founded in 1870 first performance "Mnogostradalna Genoveva" takes place on the stage centre "Videlina" situated in one of the rooms of class school. In 1899 a new building of the chitalishte was constructed - a new spacious lounge and theatre scene. In 1937 the theatre was professionalized. Funds are allocated for salaries of all artists are conducted training courses. In 1942 the theater was closed. Since 1945, the theatre in Pazardzhik again began to function and develop and strengthen one of the major cultural institutions in the city. In 1964, due to reorganization of the theatre is closed again. On 1 August 1969, the theatre restores the status of a state theatre.

With 133 years of theatrical tradition and over 40 years of state theatre; 35 theatrical seasons. The first production in theatre in Pazardzhik is Albena by Yordan Yovkov. From January by Radichkov, directed by Krikor Azaryan, to Epic Times again by Radichkov, directed by Petrinel Gochev, from As You Like It by Shakespeare directed by Leon Daniel to The Storm by Alexander Ostrovsky directed by Vladlen Alexandrov. From Vampire by Anton Strashimirov, directed by Vili Tsankov, through Roman Bath by Stanislav Stratiev, to The Backyard by Bilgesu Erenus, directed by Iskender Alton. Some of the greatest directors have worked on the stage: Krikor Azaryan, Asen Shopov, Leon Daniel, Nikolay Polyakov, Zdravko Mitkov, Nikolay Lyutskanov and others, also some of the most famous actors: Nevena Kokanova, Georgi Georgiev - Getz, Georgi Kaloyanchev, Katya Paskaleva, Ilka Zafirova, Zlatina Todeva, Leda Taseva, Georgi Cherkelov and others.

=== Regional History Museum ===
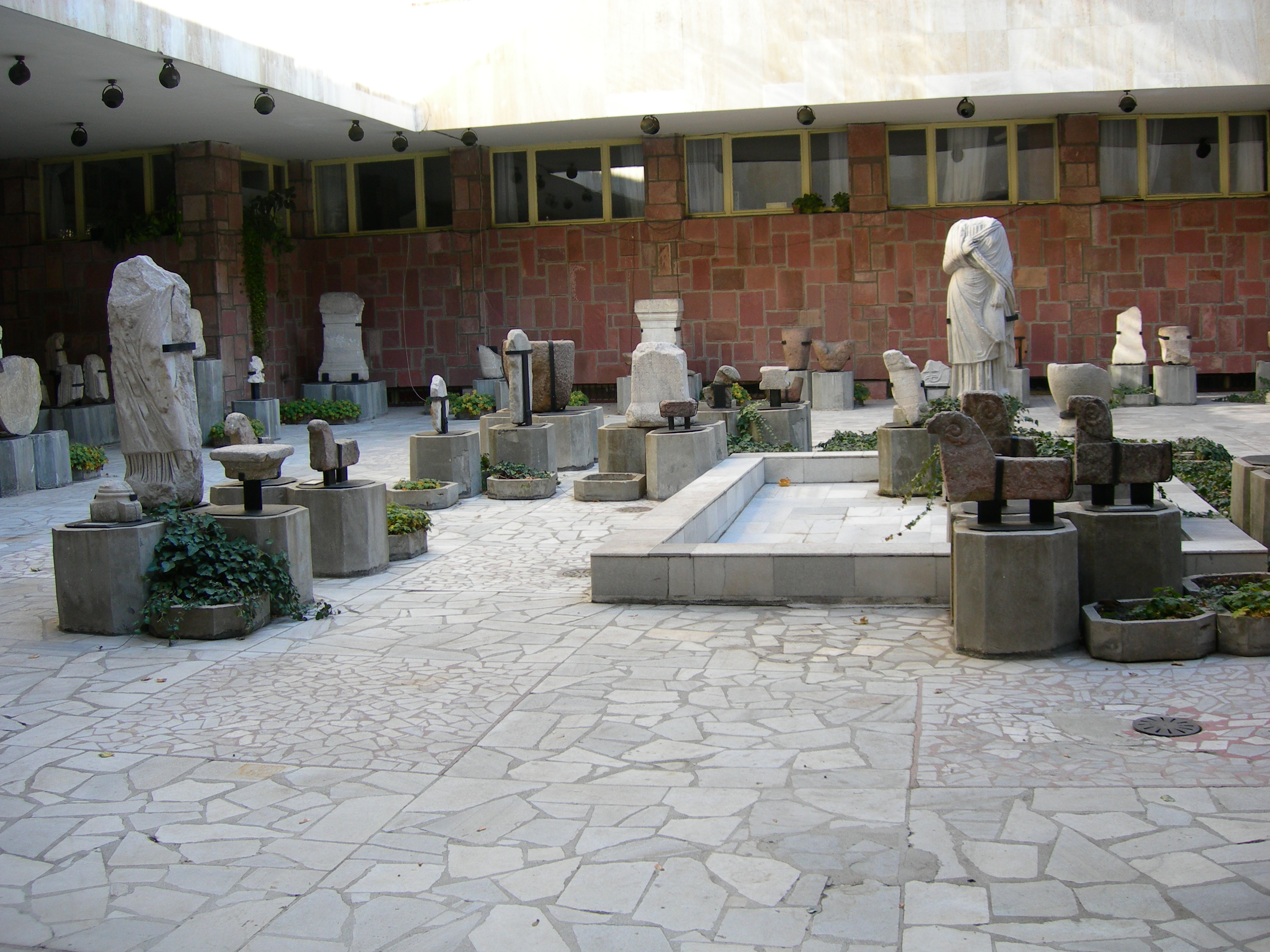
Inside view of Pazardzhik History Museum

The Pazardzhik Regional Historical Museum is one of the leading and oldest museums in Bulgaria. It was established in 1911 by a decision of the management board of Chitalishte Videlina. In 2000 it was transformed into a Regional Historical Museum with territory of activity in the towns of Pazardzhik and Plovdiv. The profile of the museum is general history and has the following main departments: Archeology; History of Bulgaria from the 15th-19th century, Ethnography, Modern history, Funds and scientific archive, Public Relations. The historical expositions are housed in a specially built building with an area of 1200 m^{2}. The museum has its own specialized library, restoration studio and photo laboratory, has a stand for the sale of advertising materials and souvenirs and a cafe.

=== Ethnographic Museum ===
The ethnographical exhibition of the history museum is set up in the biggest Baroque house from the Bulgarian National Revival period in Pazardzhik constructed in 1850 by master builders from Bratsigovo. The house belonged to Nikola Hristovich, a rich merchant from Pazardzhik. It was declared a national monument of architecture and culture by virtue of publication in State Gazette, issue No 25 of 1998.

The building is declared monument of culture of national importance. The presented exhibition illustrates different aspects of the traditional national lifestyle (typical for Pazardzhik region) some of which were practiced up to the middle of the 20th century. Pazardzhik region covers parts of Rhodopes, the Upper Thracian Plain and Sredna Gora and is characterized by widely varied ethnographic and folklore traditions.

=== Stanislav Dospevski Art Gallery ===
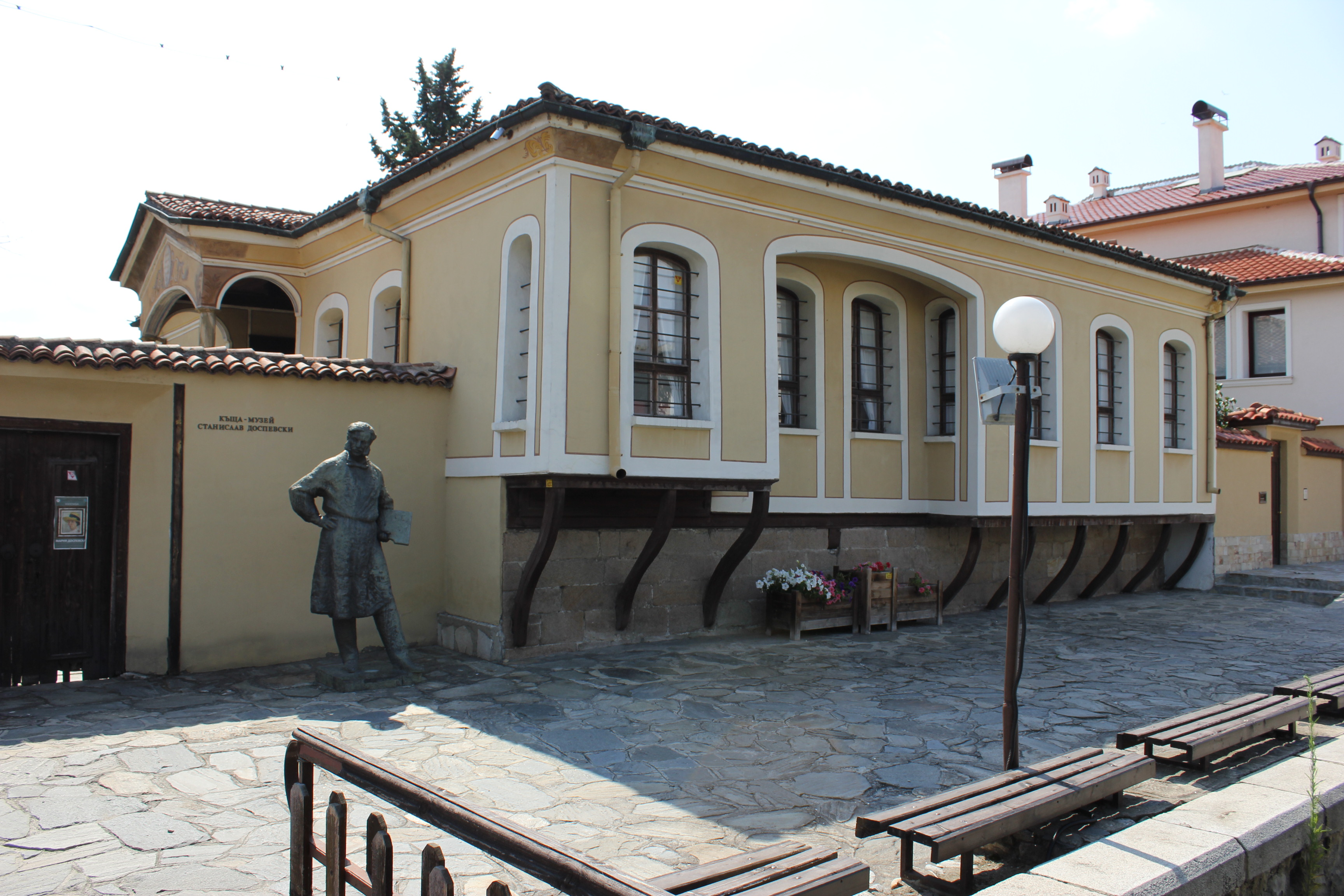
Art Gallery ''Stanislav Dospevski''

The gallery was established in 1963 as a department of the General People's Museum in the city. In 1966 it united with the Stanislav Dospevski House Museum with decision No 50 / 02.08.1966 of PNA in the gallery. The founder and first director of the gallery is the artist Tsvetan Radulov. It is named after the Samokov school artist and public figure Stanislav Dospevski (1823-1878), who worked in the field of the portrait genre. The current gallery building was opened in 1980. Later in 1911 it housed the Regional History Museum. The total exhibition area is 800 m^{2}. The art fund of the gallery exceeds 10,000 works.

The building was constructed by builders from Bratsigovo in 1864. Its a two-storey high, made of sun-dried bricks, with six rooms and a parlor, typical for the period of Revival. The exposition presents the Bulgarian fine arts from the end of the last century to the present day. It consists of 731 works by 204 authors and is located in 5 exhibition halls. All genres (portrait, landscape and still life) are presented, as well as the different currents in the Bulgarian fine arts: Revival realism, romanticism, academism, realism, symbolism, impressionism, expressionism, socialist realism, abstractionism and others.

=== Konstantin Velichkov House Museum ===
The museum is the birth house of Konstantin Velichkov, who was a prominent activist during the late Bulgarian National Revival and writer.

The house is located on Vl. Gyoshev ”4. One-storey and with a veranda, it was built around 1850 and is now declared architectural, artistic and historical monument of culture of national importance. In 1964–1965 the house was completely repaired and restored. Since 1967, the urban living conditions from the end of the 19th century and the beginning of the 20th century have been arranged in it. In the native house of Konstantin Velichkov in 1876 his sister Teofana sewed the flag of the Pazardzhik Revolutionary Committee. There is also kept an icon depicting the town of Jerusalem from 1856 that has been family heritage.

== Notable people ==
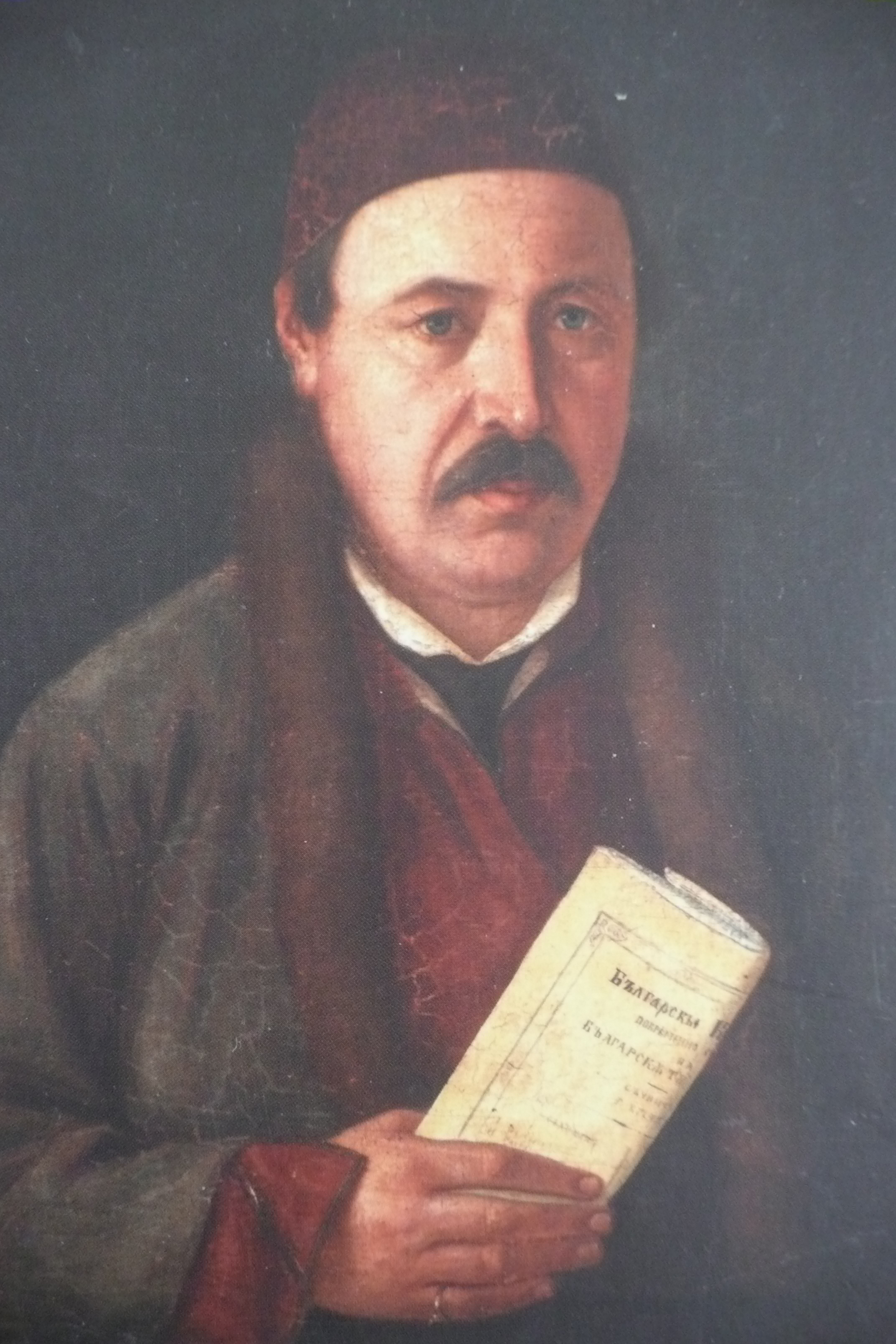
Stefan Zahariev

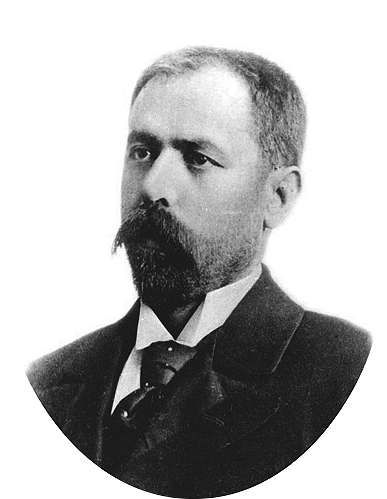
Konstantin Velichkov

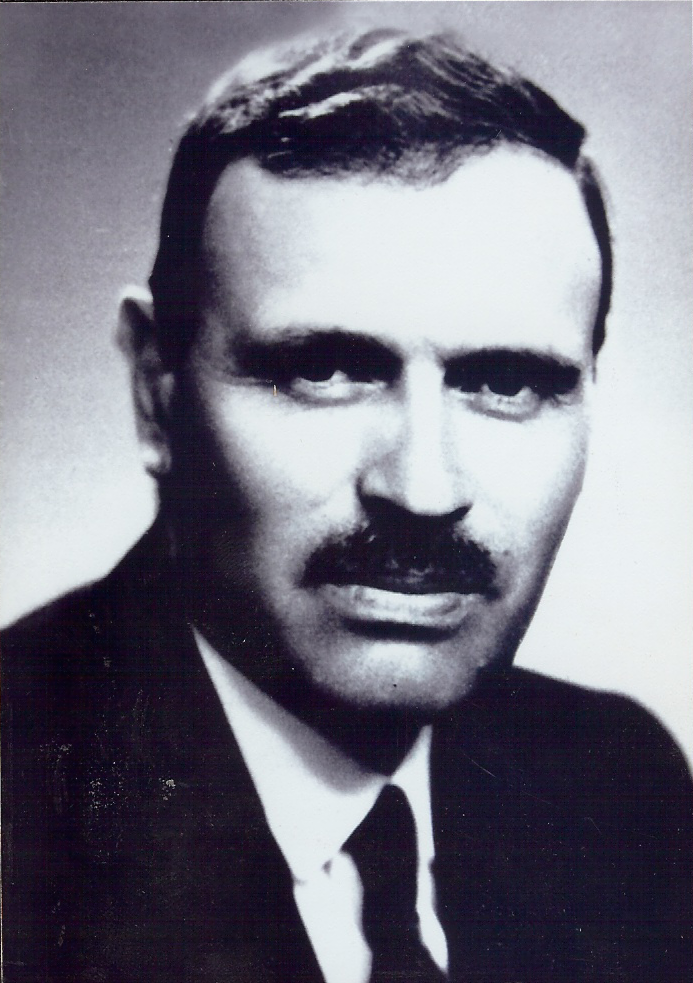
Ivan Batakliev

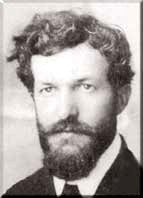
Dimitar Boyadzhiev

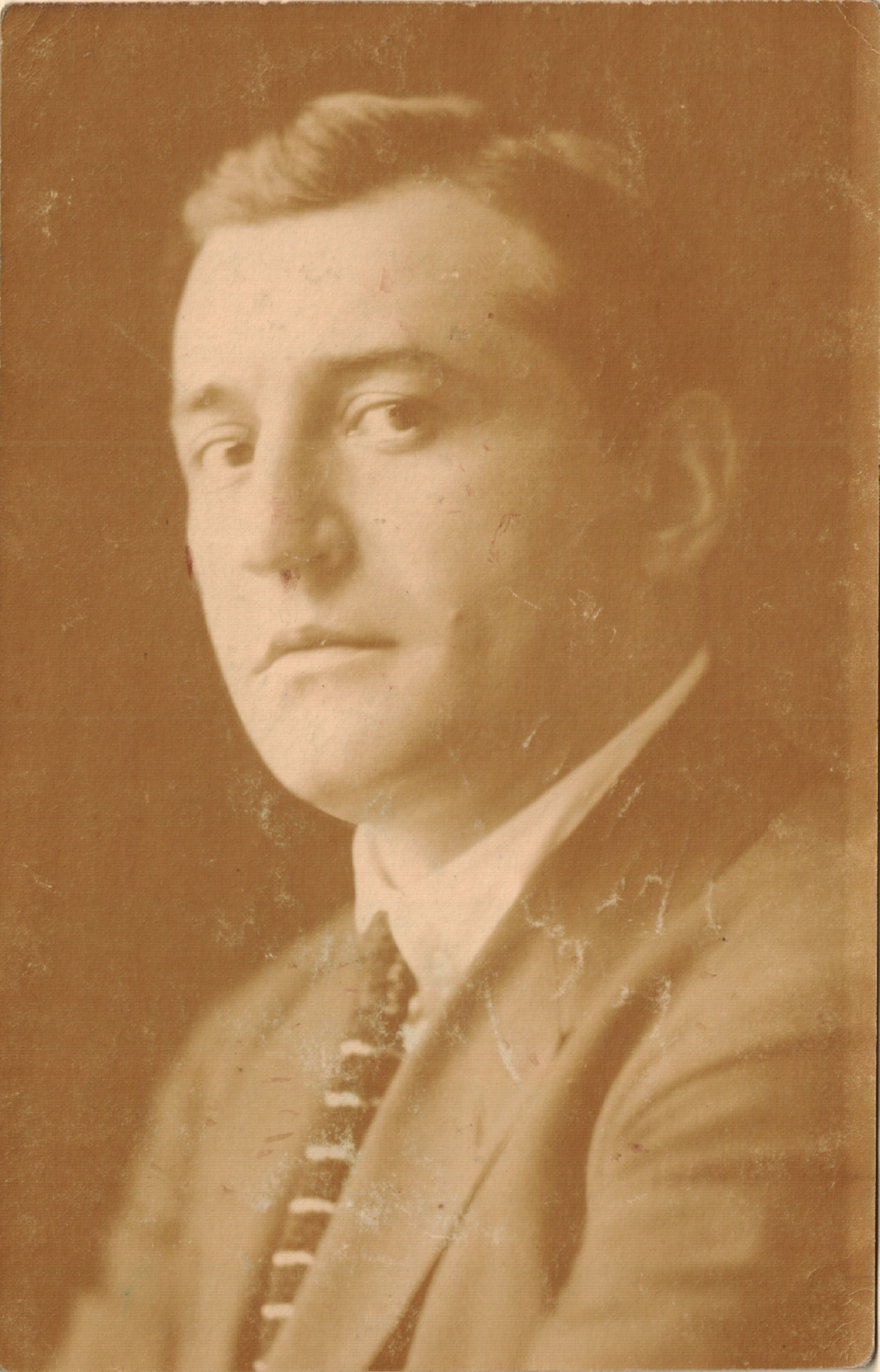
Teodor Trayanov

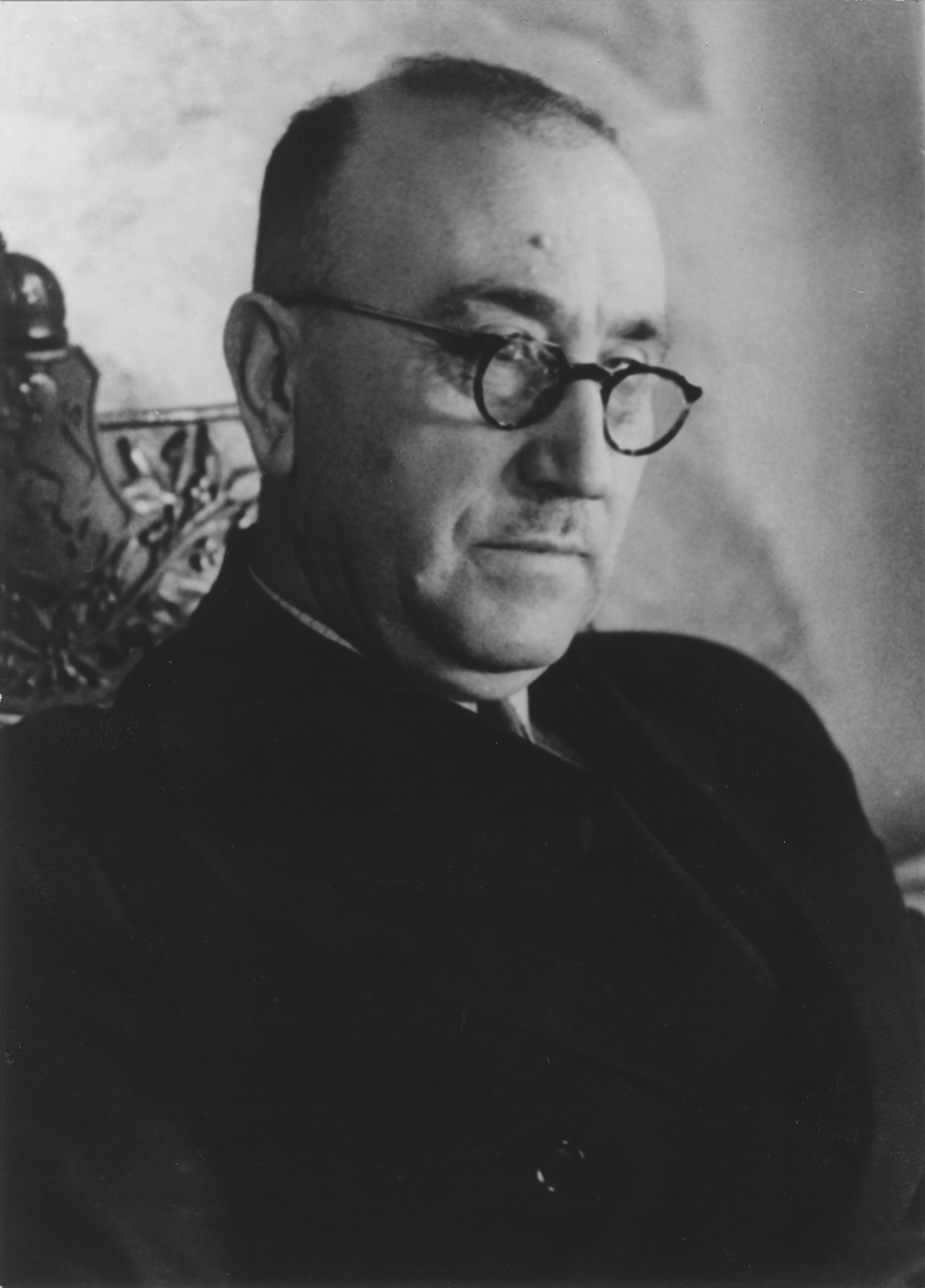
Kimon Georgiev

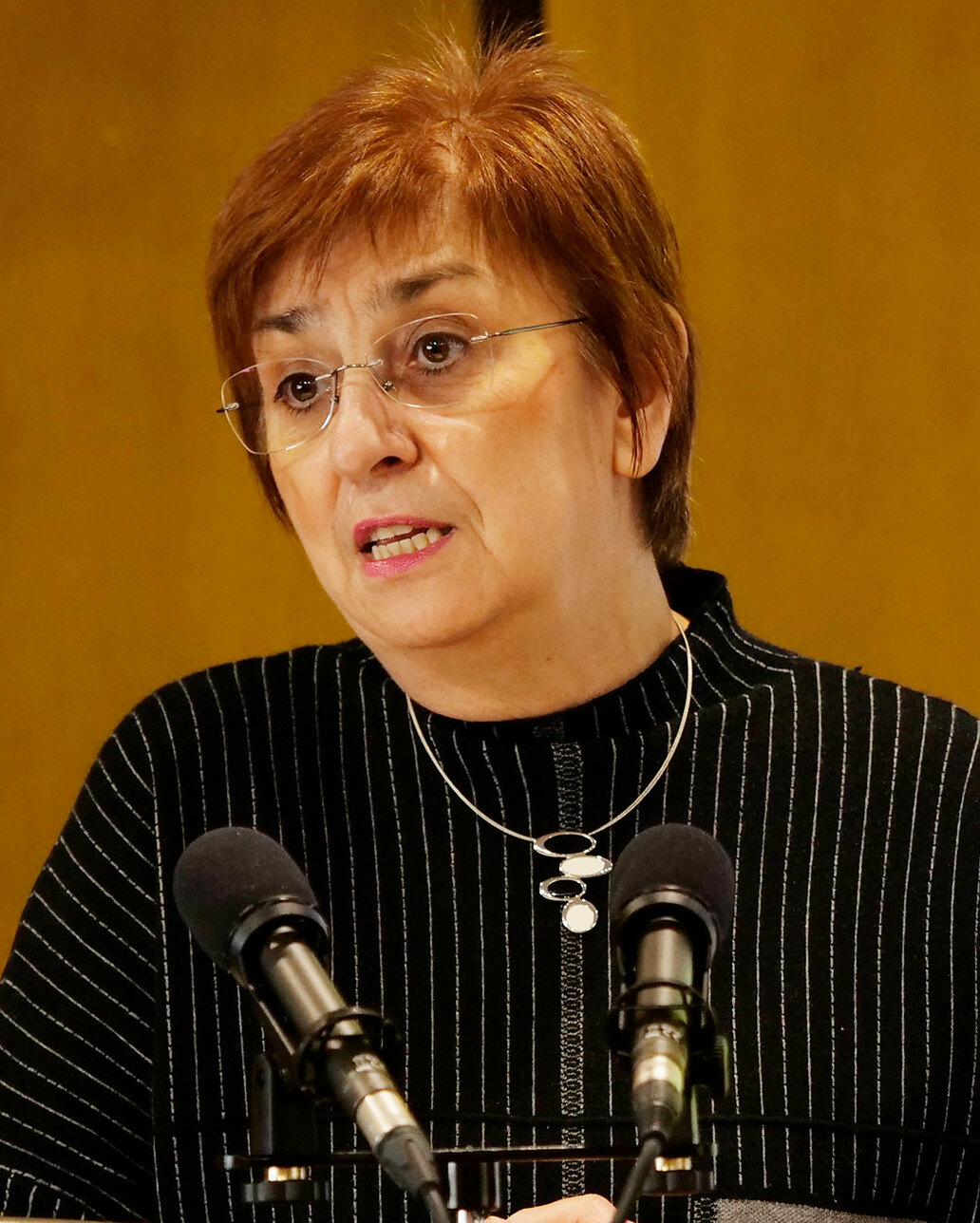
Ekaterina Mihaylova

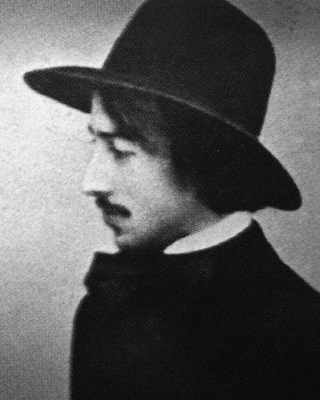
Georgi Mashev

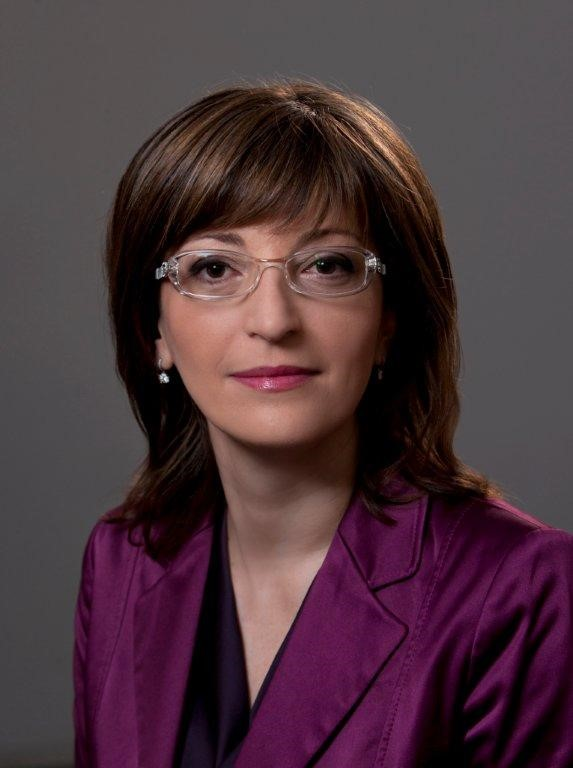
Ekaterina Zaharieva

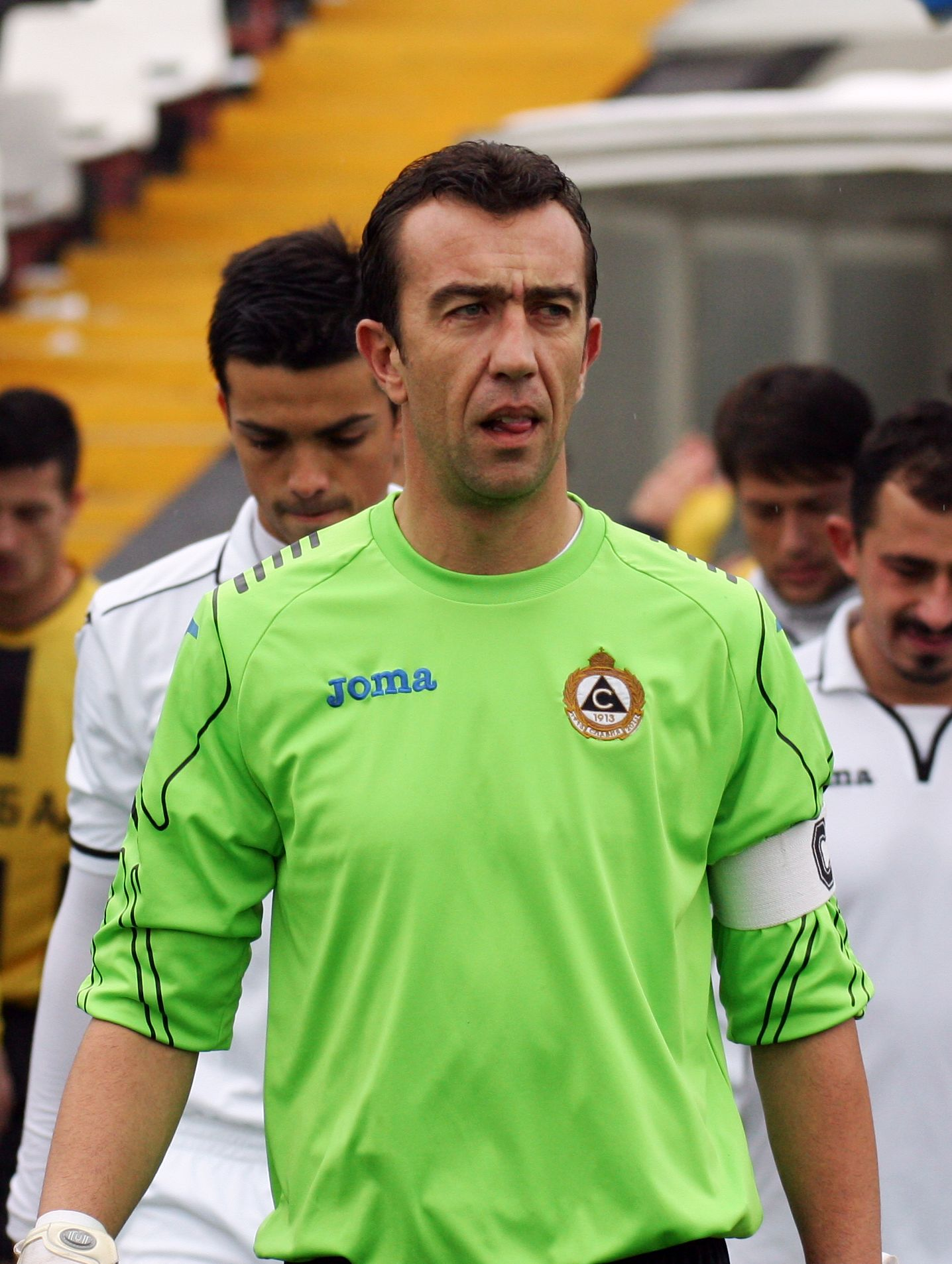
Georgi Petkov
- Stefan Zahariev (1810–1871), revival, educationalist
- Konstantin Velichkov (1855–1905), enlightener, poet, politician
- Zaharina Dimitrova (1873-1940), Bulgarian doctor, Order of Civil Merit recipient, philanthropist.
- Tzvetanka Ubinova (born 1959), writer and poet
- Ivan Batakliev (1891–1973), geographer, historian
- Nicolas Digests (1903–1968), poet
- Artine Artinian (1907–2005), scholar of French literature
- Violeta Gindeva (1946–2019), actress, deputy mayor of Pazardzhik in 2003–2007
- Georgi Hristovich (1863–1926), naturalist and conservationist
- Ekaterina Mihaylova (born 1956), politician
- Serafim Todorov (born 1969), boxer
- Todor Karakashev (born 1954), writer and journalist
- Milen Spassov (born 1977), writer
- Ekaterina Zakharieva (born 1975), politician
- Georgi Petkov (born 1976), footballer
- Renata Kamberova (born 1990), rhythmic gymnast group olympics bronze medalist in 2016
- Shenka Popova (1866–1913), actress

== Bibliography ==
- Бойков, Григор (2008). Татар Пазарджик : от основаването на града до края на XVII век : изследвания и документи (in Bulgarian) (1 ed.). Sofia: Amicitia. ISBN 9789549229110. OCLC 751461365.
- История на България (in Bulgarian) (1st ed.). София: Наука и изкуство. 1961.
- Тиков, Тикомир (1978). Руско-турската освободителна война 1877-1878 в спомени и очерци на българи-очевидци (in Bulgarian) (1st ed.). Наука и изкуство.
- Батаклиев, Иван (1969). Пазарджик и Пазарджишко (in Bulgarian) (1st ed.). София: Профиздат.
- Енциклопедия Пазарджик (in Bulgarian) (1st ed.). Пазарджик: Община Пазарджик. 2011. ISBN 9789546843081.
- "Общински план за развитие на Община Пазарджик 2014 г.—2020 г." (PDF) (in Bulgarian). Община Пазарджик. 9 October 2014.
