= Church of St Constantine and Helena, Pazardzhik =

Church of St Constantine and Helena
- Св. Св. Константин и Елена
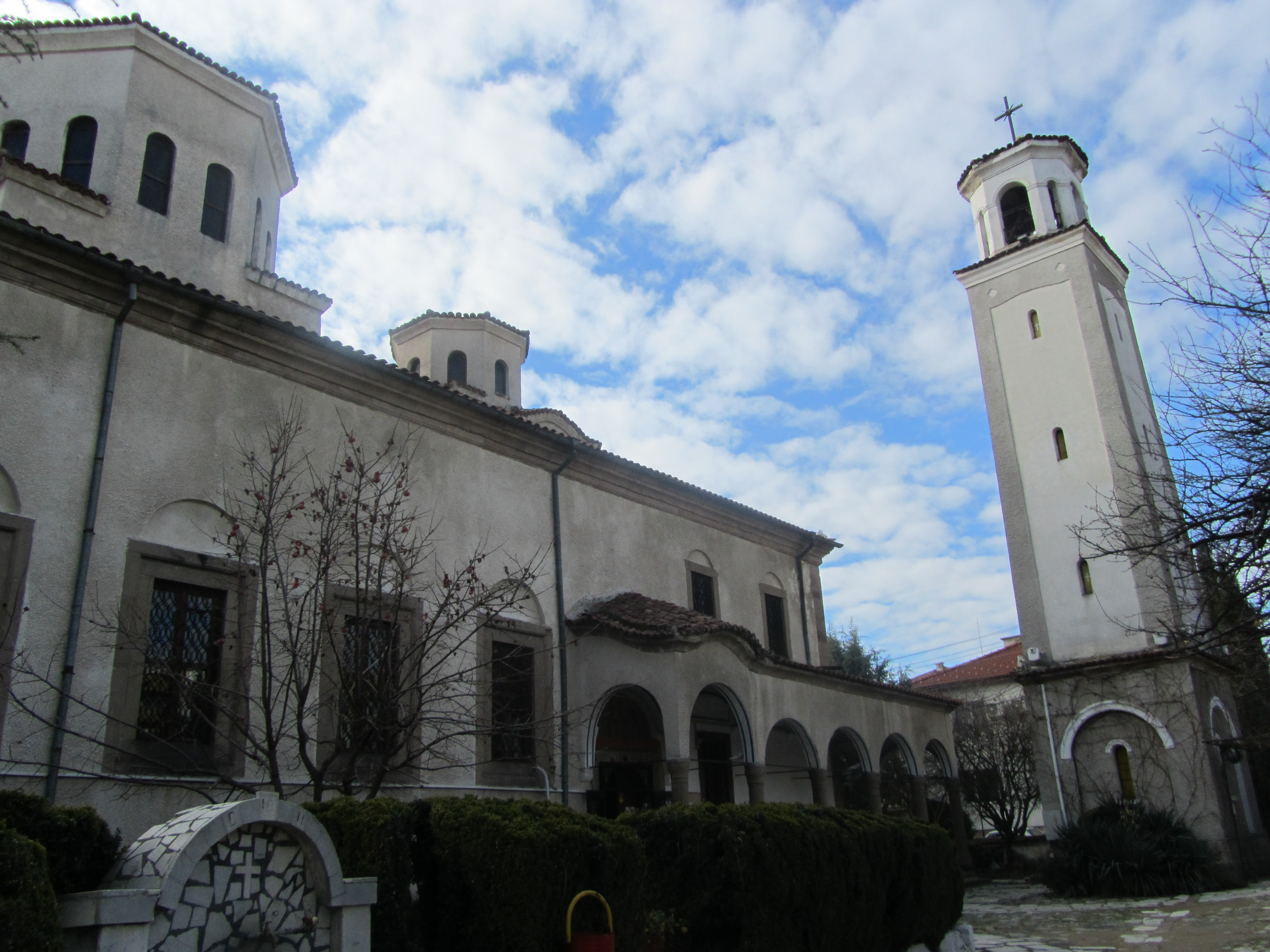
- Church of St Constantine and Helena
- 42°12′0.6″N 24°19′55.4″E
- Location: Pazardzhik
- Country: Bulgaria
- Denomination: Eastern Orthodox

History
- Founded: 1873
- Consecrated: 1890

Architecture
- Functional status: Active
- Architect: Dimitar Boyanin

Church of St Constantine and Helena (Bulgarian: Св. Св. Константин и Елена) is an Eastern Orthodox church located in Pazardzhik, Bulgaria.

== History ==
St Constantine (St Kostadin) was the first church built in 1848 with a special firman by Constantinople. The first priest was Pope George.

The Church of St. Constantine and Helena" town. It is located in the heart of the former Chiksalon district of Pazardzhik. In fact, it is the neighborhood church that also bears the name of the protectors of the district town.

On November 8, 1847, the second school in Pazardzhik was opened in the yard of the church.

On September 20, 1866, the church burned down. Many locals from the neighborhood began to collect aid to build a new church of stone and bricks. It was restored in 1873 by the Bratsigovo architects, with Dimitar Boyanin being chief master. The newly reconstructed church is a three-aisled basilica with naves separated by columns.

The consecration of the church took place on October 23, 1890, by Bishop Parthenius.

== Architecture ==
After restoration, the church is a three-aisled basilica with naves separated by columns, which are connected with arches. The church has a single chancel. The wooden iconostasis is uncarved.

The church has several frescoes. The central dome depicts the following scenes. Most of the icons were painted by Konstantin Hadzhi Angelov Belovski and Stefan Andonov, followers of Stanislav Dospevski.

The construction and architecture of the church is considered an example of the Bulgarian upsurge in the district Chiksalan. It preserves documents related to education, lifestyle and political situation in Pazardzhik during the Bulgarian National Revival.
