= Zaharina Dimitrova =

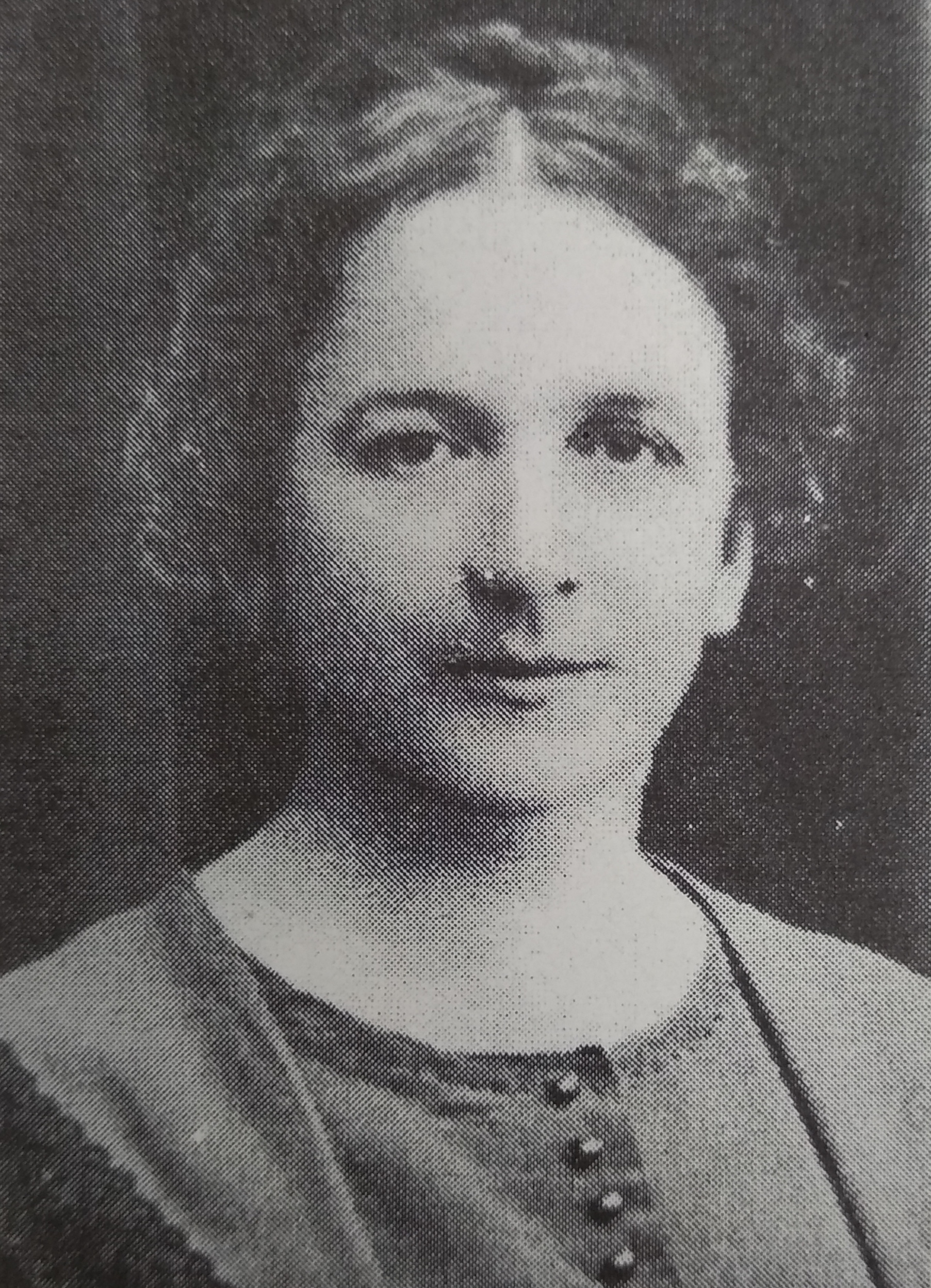
- Born: 26 November 1873; Resen, Ottoman Empire
- Died: 14 April 1940 (aged 66); Pazardzhik, Kingdom of Bulgaria
- Education: University of Lausanne
- Occupation: Physician

Zaharina (Zacharia) Mitseva Dimitrova was a prominent Bulgarian medical doctor from Macedonia.

== Biography ==
Zaharina Dimitrova was born on November 26, 1873, in Resen, then in the Ottoman Empire. She is the daughter of Mitse Velov, who is the son of the famous Bulgarian Revivalist Velyo Miloshev. She graduated from the Bulgarian Girls' High School of Thessaloniki and then went to study obstetrics in Moscow. From 1892 she continued her education as a medical student at the University of Lausanne. Then, as a scholarship holder of the Bulgarian Exarchate, she continued her education in medicine in Nancy, France, where she graduated in 1901. She won an anatomy and histology competition for students and was awarded a silver medal during her second year of study. She graduated with a gold medal for distinction. On February 27, 1901, she graduated as a course leader. Her doctoral dissertation was "Studies on the structure of the pineal gland in some mammals." It was printed in Belgium and distributed by "Nevraks" magazine. She settled in Sofia, where she passed a test and on March 23, 1901, received a permit for free practice of medicine in Bulgaria. Due to an epidemic, she was urgently sent as a doctor to Sliven, where she worked and lived until 1910. At that time she married the military pharmacist Major Panayot Dimitrov. In 1910, the two settled in Pazardzhik. Initially, she proceeded to the Primary District Hospital, and then worked as a school, district and freelance doctor. During the Balkan Wars in 1912-1913, Zaharina headed the sanitary unit in Pazardzhik. She examined the sick in the refugee camp in Krichim. Due to the mobilization of Dr. Iliya Matakiev and Dr. Atanas Dimitrov, the mayor of Pazardzhik appointed her city doctor. In her husband's pharmacy, she set up the city's first blood test laboratory.

Due to deteriorating health, in 1930, she retired from active medical work. She started active charity and public activity as a chairwoman of the women's society "Budna Makedonka" and as an active member of the women's charity society "Prosveta" in Pazardzhik. She furnished part of the maternity and nursing homes in Pazardzhik with personal funds. She helped poor refugee families. Together with her husband, she supported several relatives of their relatives to study. Among them is the pharmacist Boris Lyakov. For years they have provided food for the summer student camp of the First Kliment Ohridski High School in Pazardzhik. In 1838, they bought a car, a "Mercedes" ambulance, and donated it to the hospital to serve the citizens of Pazardzhik to provide emergency medical care. One of the oldest fountains in Pazardzhik, "Gerana" (between the buildings of the Art Gallery, the Regional History Museum and the Old Post Office), was built with family funds, and is a gift to the city.

Zaharina was awarded the Order of Civil Merit V degree (ladies' cross) and the medal "For Excellent Service."

She died on April 14, 1940, in Pazardzhik.

Her personal archive is stored in the Dimitrov Family Fund (Fund 571K) in the State Archives of Pazardzhik. It consists of 75 archival units from the period 1892-2009.
