= Georgi Hristovich =

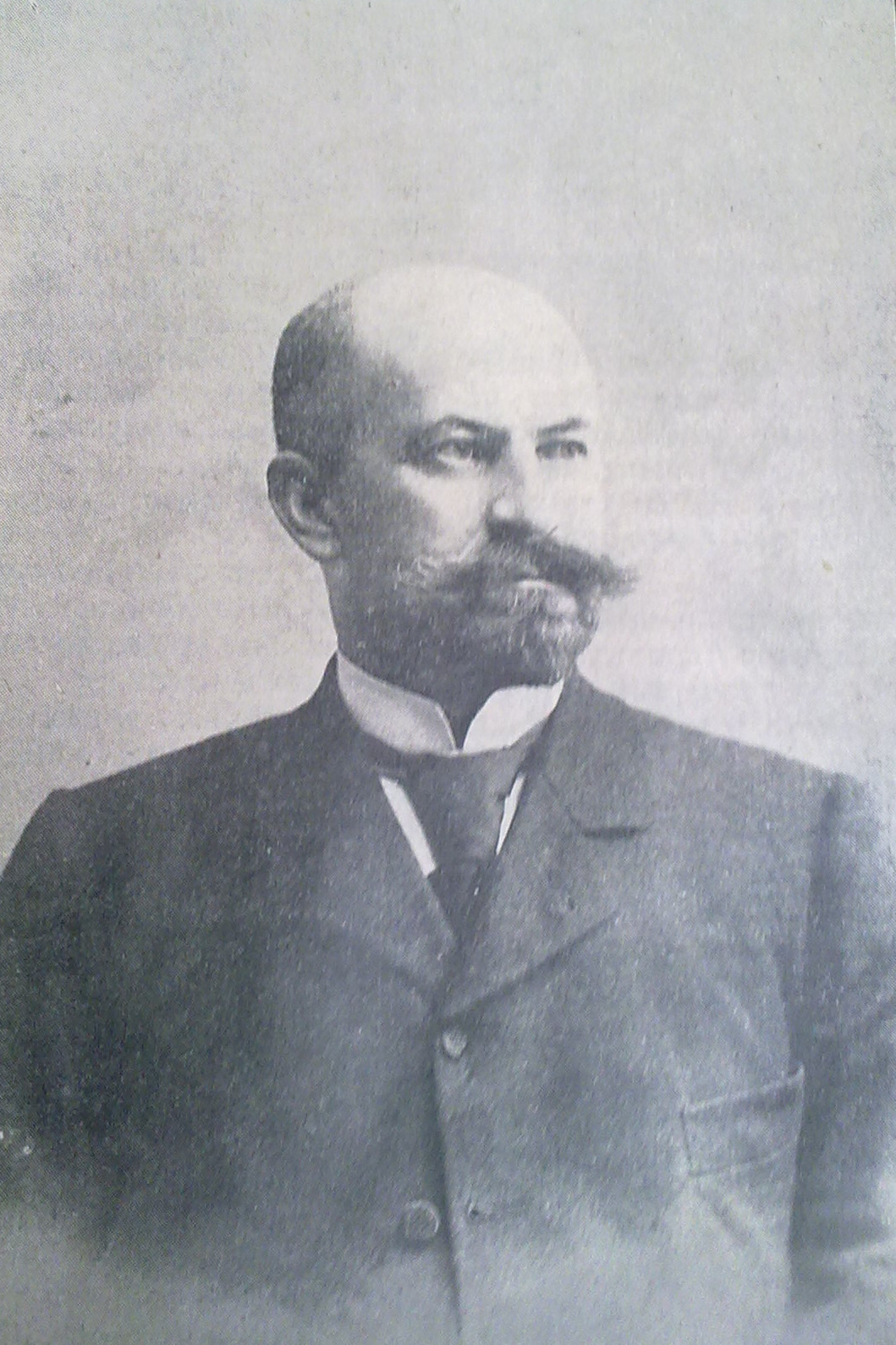

Georgi Konstantinov Hristovich (23 June 1863 – 12 March 1926) was a Bulgarian naturalist, zoologist, and conservationist. He founded a magazine, "Priroda", for naturalists, hunters, and fisherfolk.

== Biography ==
Hristovich was born in Pazardzhik in a family of merchants many of whom had moved to Dubrovnik. His grandfather exported leather to Austria and imported fabrics from Turkey. His father traded in livestock at the borders of Moesia and Thrace which were sold in Istanbul. He travelled widely on horseback, sometimes taking the young Georgi along. The family lost its fortunes due to livestock diseases. He studied first at the Greek school in Pazardzhik and high school in Plovdiv before studying biology at the University of Geneva under Karl Vogt in 1886. Here he became a specialist in taxidermy and he became a preparator in Sofia which later became the national zoological museum. He exhibited his preparations at the International Exhibition in Plovdiv in 1892. In 1890 he was a founding member of the Sofia Hunting Society “Sokol” and was involved in the establishment of hunting laws in Bulgaria. In 1893 he founded a magazine dealing with nature "Природа" which he edited until his death. This illustrated journal of science, hunting, fishing and economics was also supported by several others including Stefan Georgiev, Stefan Petkov, Stepan Yurinic, Dimitar Yoakimov, Nikola Nedyalkov and Georgi Bonchev, Asen Zlatarov, Stefan Konsulov, Todor Morov, Ivan Buresh and Metodiy Popov. He founded a Bulgarian Hunting Association and retired to an estate in Sarambey. After his death the magazine was edited by his son.
