= Ivan Batakliev =

Bulgarian geographer (1891–1973)

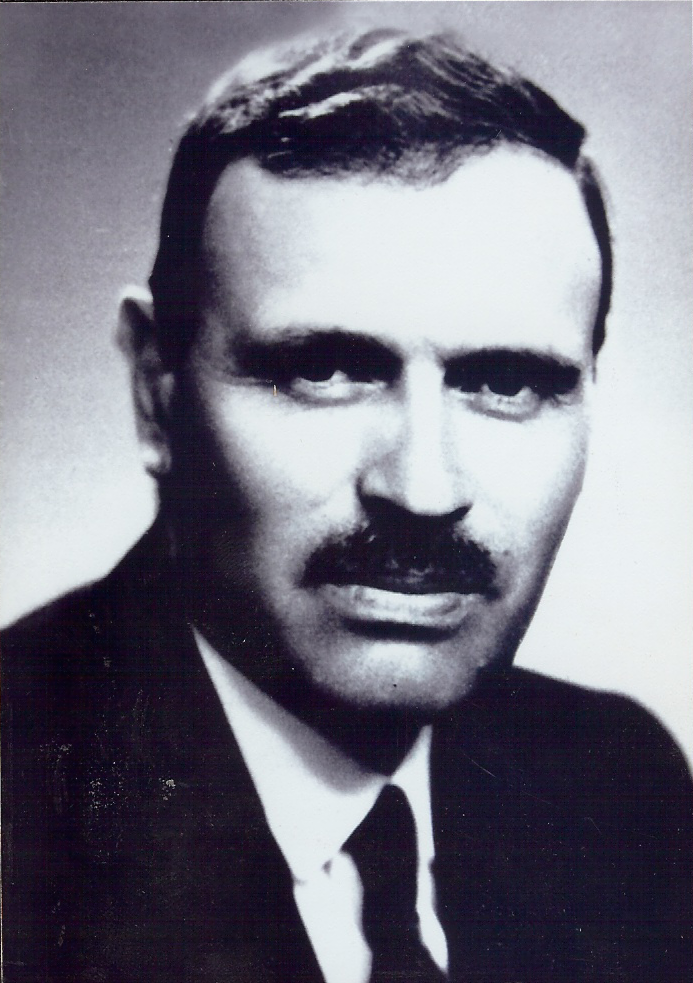
- Born: 24 January 1891; Tatar Pazardzhik, Bulgaria
- Died: 15 December 1973 (aged 82); Sofia, Bulgaria
- Occupation: geographer
- Known for: geopolitician

Ivan Batakliev (Bulgarian: Иван Батаклиев; 1891–1973) is a Bulgarian geographer, historian and geopolitician.

Professor, Head of the Department of General Geography and Cultural and Political Geography, Dean of the Faculty of History and Philology and Director of the Geographical Institute of Sofia University ″St. Kliment Ohridski″, co-founder and chairman of the Bulgarian Geographical Society, corresponding member of the geographical societies in Berlin, Prague, Belgrade, Würzburg, Greifswald, the Bulgarian Archaeological Institute and a full member of the Thracian Scientific Institute and the Union of Scientists.

Author of over 110 scientific papers, 22 of which have been translated into foreign languages and specialist in Austria, England, Germany, France and the Netherlands. Ivan Batakliev is considered to be the founder of the Bulgarian geopolitical science, as well as of the landscape science in Bulgaria. Student and successor of Anastas Ishirkov.
