= Varosha, Pazardzhik =

Place in Pazardzhik, Bulgaria

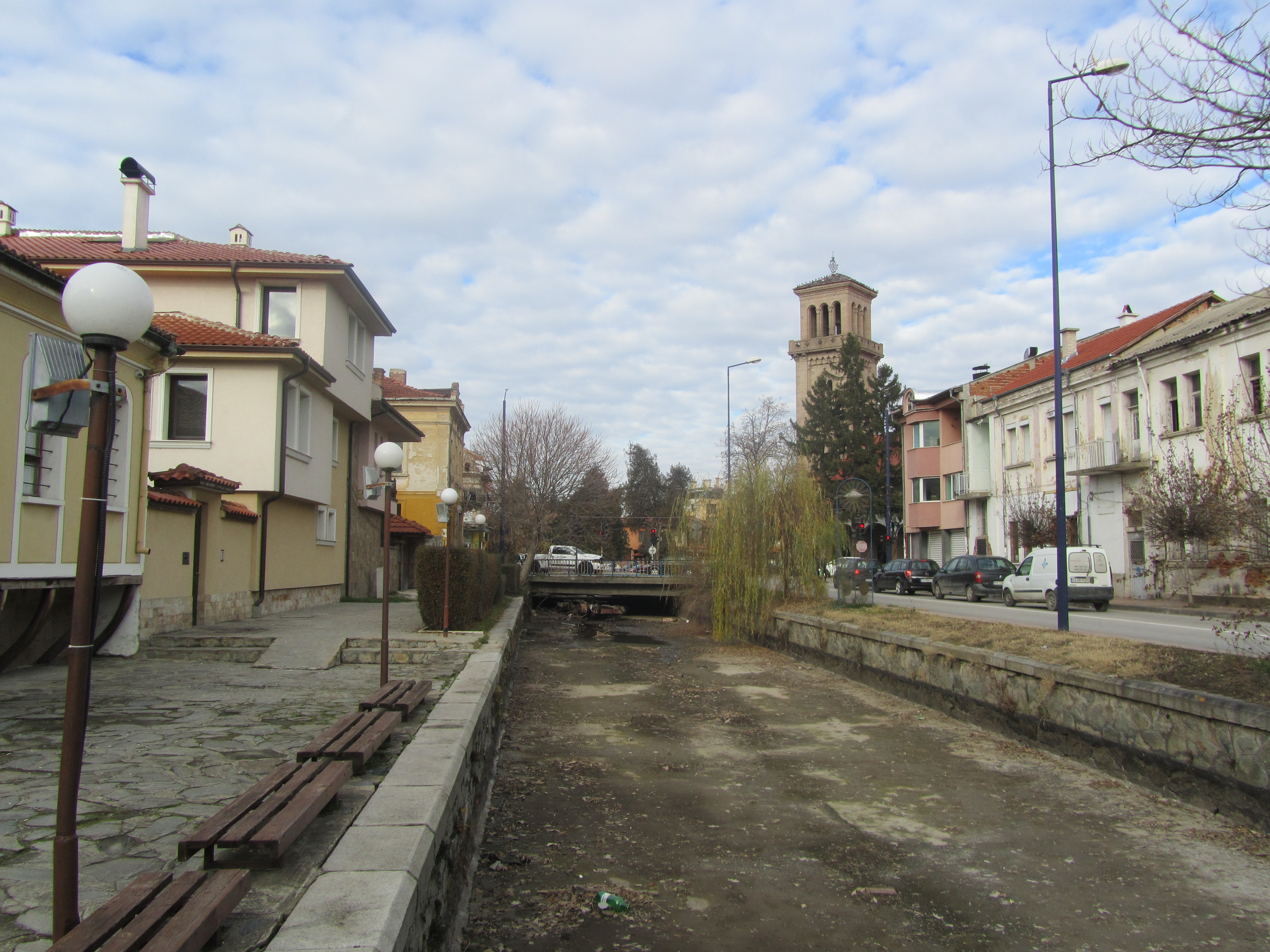
Varosha Quarter

Varosha (Bulgarian: Вароша), commonly known as Varosh, is a quarter located in Pazardzhik. It shares its name with quarters in Blagoevgrad, Lovech, Targovishte, Razgrad and other cities. The word varosh, also varusha, varosha, is derived from Hungarian meaning "city centre, the old part of the city, constructed high above." Some other scholars such as Strashimir Lishev argue that the word is derived from Bosnian and means "suburb."

First appearing in the beginning of the 17th century, many craftsmen from many villages began to move in. It was the cultural centre of the town, surpassing all quarters in Pazardzhik. In the first half of the 17th century a church was constructed which served Varosha and a school followed afterwards. Expansion was made to the area because of migration to the quarter, which began to prosper financially. A devastating fire burnt much of the quarter. Many buildings began to be re-built. During the 19th century it was the cultural centre of the town, home to many cultural centres and institutions such as Chitalishte Videlina. It was distinguished by its noble residents, merchants, craftsmen and artisans, which all lived here.

It is home to many museums, including the house-museum of Nikola Hristovich, who was a wealthy merchant. The museum was turned into an ethnographic museum. It is the biggest Baroque house in Pazardzhik from the Bulgarian National Awakening. Another museum is the Stanislav Art Gallery which hosts many fine art genres such as romanticism, realism, symbolism and others. The most notable landmark in Varosha is the Church of the Dormition of the Mother of God, a symbol of Bulgarian Revivalism. Its wood-carved iconostasis is protected by UNESCO.

== History ==
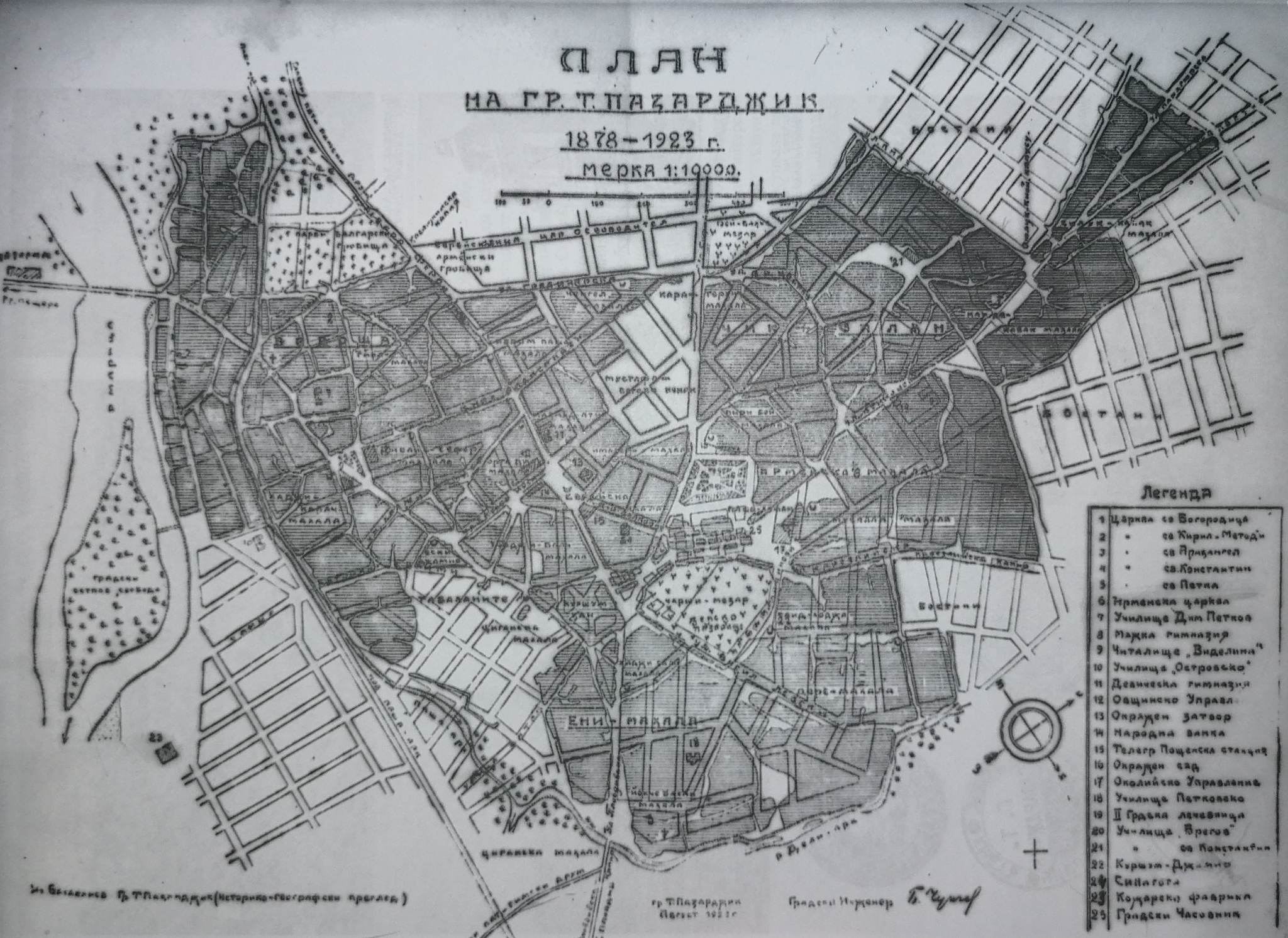
City plan of Pazardzhik in the 19th–20th century.

The quarter first appeared around the 16th–17th century. According to Stefan Zahariev in his book Geographical historical statistical description of the Tatar Pazardzhik kaza, Bulgarian craftsmen came from nearby villages and established a small hamlet on the right bank of the river Maritsa. In the 17th–18th centuries the town became a handicraft centre, practicing over 40 crafts. During Ottoman rule in Bulgaria, the term "varosh" was used to designate the Christian community in the town. The quarter had 66 houses according to a Turkish document from 1635. During the 17th century, many Christians move into Pazardzhik in a search of a better life. The population was made by primarily by craftsmen, which all migrated from villages in the Rhodope Mountains. The quarter culturally surpassed the rest of the districts in the town, such as Chiksalan and Eni mahalla. In the first half of the 17th century, the church of the Dormition of the Mother of God was constructed. It was then a small and wooden building dug deep where liturgical books were written. It served Varosha as the only church in the quarter. Shortly after its construction, a cell school was opened.

In the 18th and 19th centuries, numerous people began to migrate to Tatar Pazardzhik, causing the quarter to expand to the north and south. The city began to prosper financially due to an influx in artisans and merchants which determined the need for development of education. The only bishop, Dionysius of Agathonice, which served from the 17th century to 1827 and the founder of the cell school in the quarter, built two rooms to accommodate monks Gregory and Athanacius who taught Bulgarian and Greek respectively.

A fire broke out in the quarter Varosha, leaving the church, bazaar and school burnt and ruined. In 1837 esnafs, using funds collected by them and a loan from a bank in Vienna, the church was successfully re-built, occupying an area of 1140 m^{2}. The church was consecrated either in 1840 or 1841. A temporary school was built in the churchyard in 1839 and four years later, in 1843, with funds from esnafs and citizens, a new school with two floors and 7 classrooms was opened. In one of the classrooms a new school called Glavno, later called Varoshka, was opened in 1845, which used the Bell-Lancaster method. To combat the Greek influence masters of the local esnafs brought Nikifor Popkonstantinov and Yordan Nenov as teachers. Two more grades were implemented between 1845 and 1847. In the period 1847–1876 at least 30 teachers taught at the school including Konstantin Velichkov and Yakov Matakiev. One year later, in 1848, a girls' school was opened with funds from Petar Beron and Aleksandar Exarch. The first teacher in the girls' school was nun Hadzhi Tatiana from Teteven.

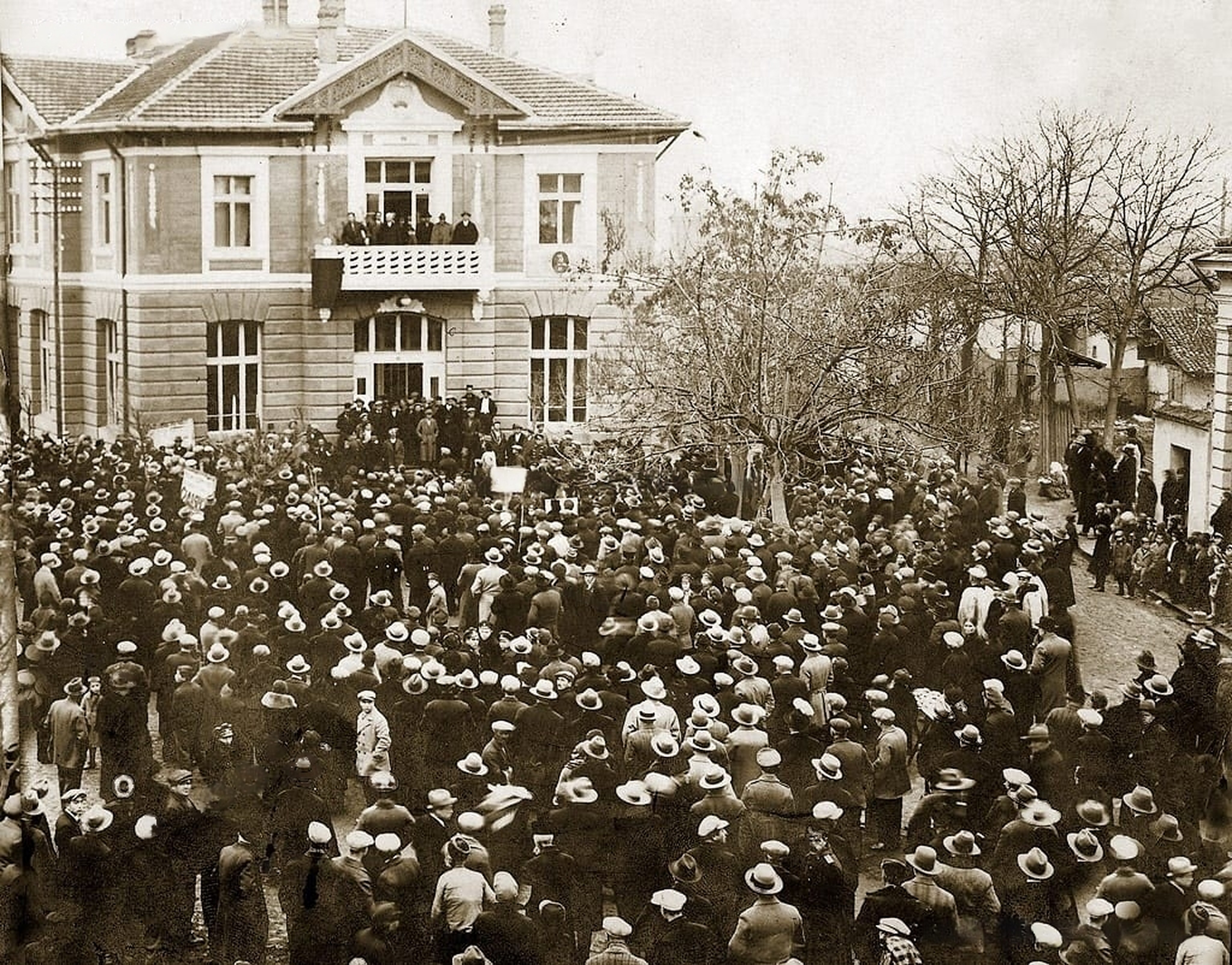
Chitalishte Videlina, Varosha in 1927

In 1862 a community centre, also known as a chitalishte, was opened in Varosha. It was one of the first during the Revival in Bulgaria. The painter Stanislav Dospevski gave the name, which meant light and education. The chairmen of the community center board were Kostadin Ivanchov Penov, Georgi Konsulov, Konstantin Velichkov, Yakov Matakiev and Todor Kirov. The board took the initiative to build its own building in 1896 and the city administration decided to give 2503 m^{2} of land in Varosha. On 2 February 1870 a women's union called Prosveta was established which directly engaged in the management of the girls' school, making sure to locate teachers and provide funds for their payment. After the Liberation of Bulgaria, Pazardzhik was divided into four quarters—Varosha, Uspenski, Chiksalan and Petkovski. Varosha was culturally and economically more advanced than the rest of the town. Many of the educational institutions were located in Varosha. The population including the number of clerks, employees, teachers and unemployed people was growing.

Doctor and historian Konstantin Kantarev describes the architecture of Varosha in his book The Spring of a Town: "The houses of the rich [families] in Varosha were guilded, two-storeyed, with stone stairs and balconies, anterooms with small multicoloured windows - blue, red, yellow, purple. Their courtyards were small, paved with slabs. [...] There were no cowsheds, no hens. Often in a small cage a canary hopped and sang. In some homes they played the piano. Phaetons often stopped at their iron gates - they drove or brought from the station their owners who had arrived from [Plovdiv] or Sofia by the fast train."

== Places of interest ==
=== House-museum Nikolaki Hristovich ===
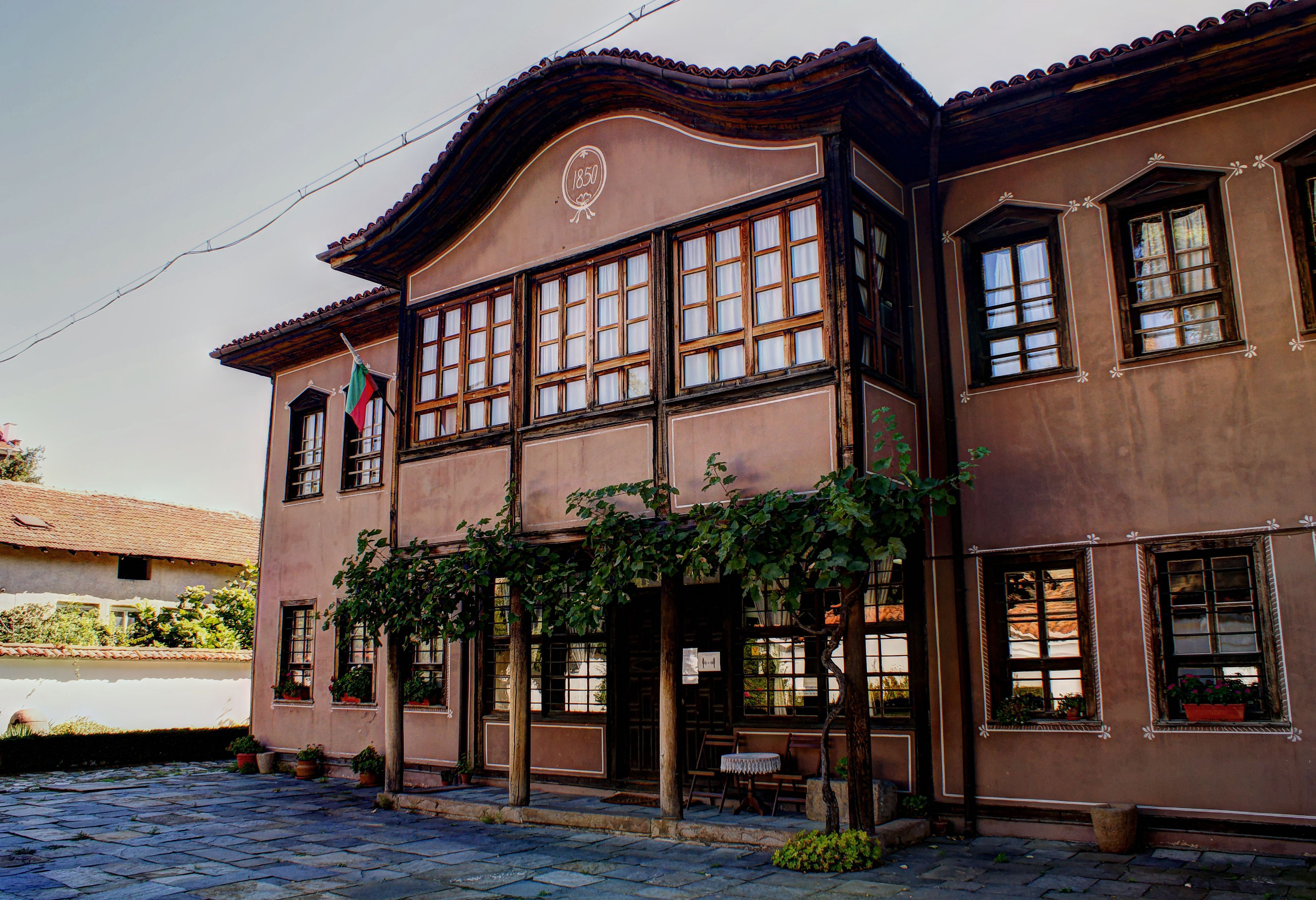
House-museum Nikolaki Hristovich

The house-museum is a department of the Pazardzhik Regional Historical Museum and houses the ethnographic exhibition. The exhibition shows the traditional culture, ethnographic and folklore aspects of Pazardzhik. It is the largest Plovdiv Baroque house from the Bulgarian National Revival period in Pazardzhik, which was built in 1850 by Shteryu Gyulemetov from Bratsigovo. The home belonged to Nikolaki Hristovich, a wealthy merchant and "beglichki" (tax collector) from Pazardzhik. Specifically, the exhibition showcases equipment for processing of cotton, flax, hemp and wool, a shoemaker's shop and contrast of poor and rich families.

=== House-museum Stanislav Dospevski ===
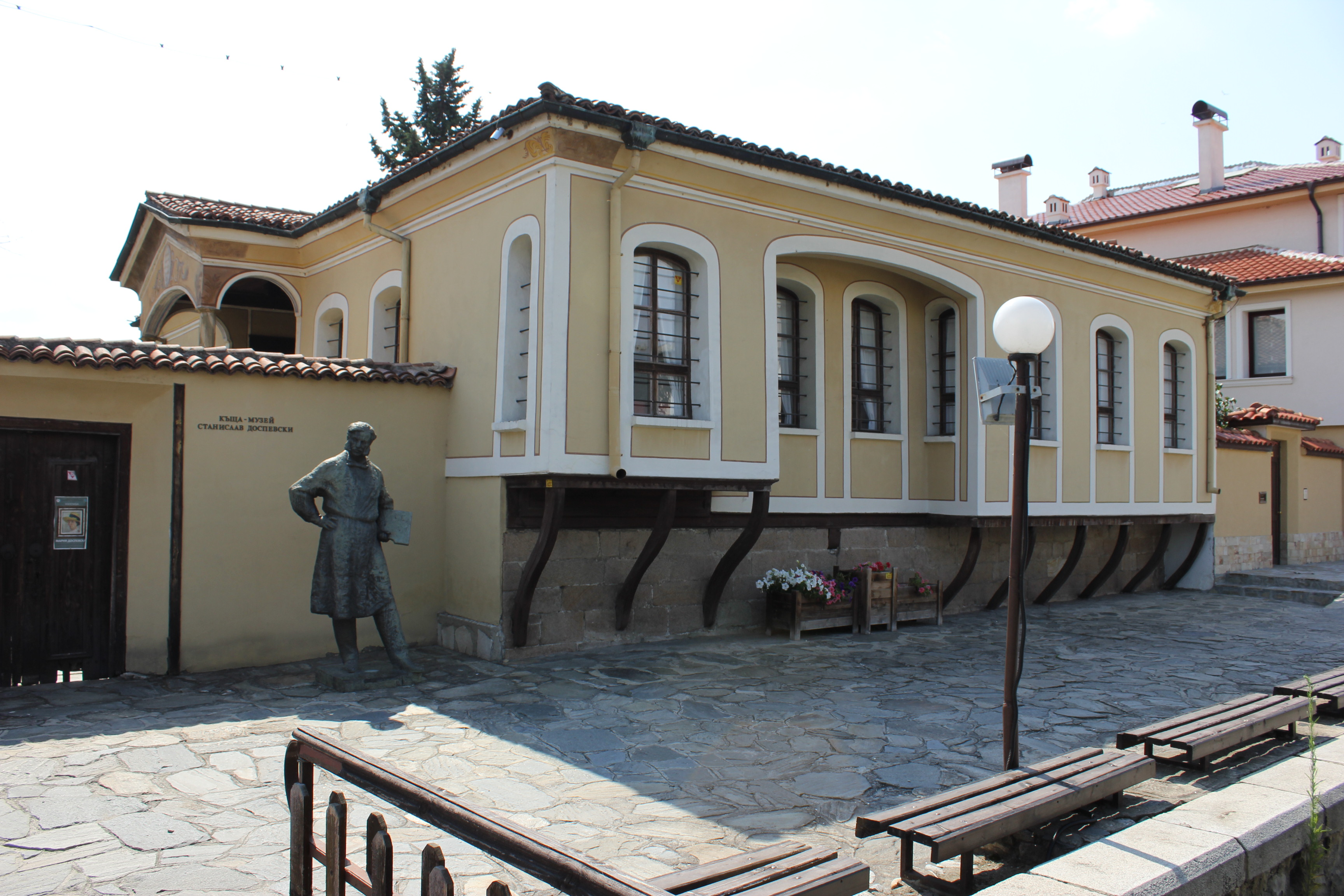
House-museum Stanislav Dospevski

The house-museum is a department of the Pazardzhik Gallery of Fine Arts, which has a stock of over 10,000 paintings, drawings and sculptural work. The museum houses an art gallery together with the house-museum Georgi Gerasimov. It was the home of Bulgarian artist Stanislav Dospevski, who is one of the creators of modern Bulgarian painting. The museum was established in 1963 and since 1964 is declared as a national monument of culture and entered the 100 Tourist Sites of Bulgaria. It represents articles and authentic furniture, works and wall paintings. The house itself was built in 1864 by builders from the town of Bratsigovo. It is a two-storey, made with sun-dried bricks and has six rooms and a parlor.

=== House-museum Konstantin Velichkov ===
The house itself was built in 1850 by architects from Bratsigovo. Refurbished in 1964–1965, it was turned into a museum in 1965 and was declared an architectural, artistic and historical monument of culture of national importance. It is a one-storey with a veranda, typical for the Bulgarian Revivalism. Inside it is furnished in a traditional renaissance manner and also Konstantin Velichkov's study with ornate walls, painted with "alafranga" motifs.

=== Church of the Dormition of the Mother of God ===
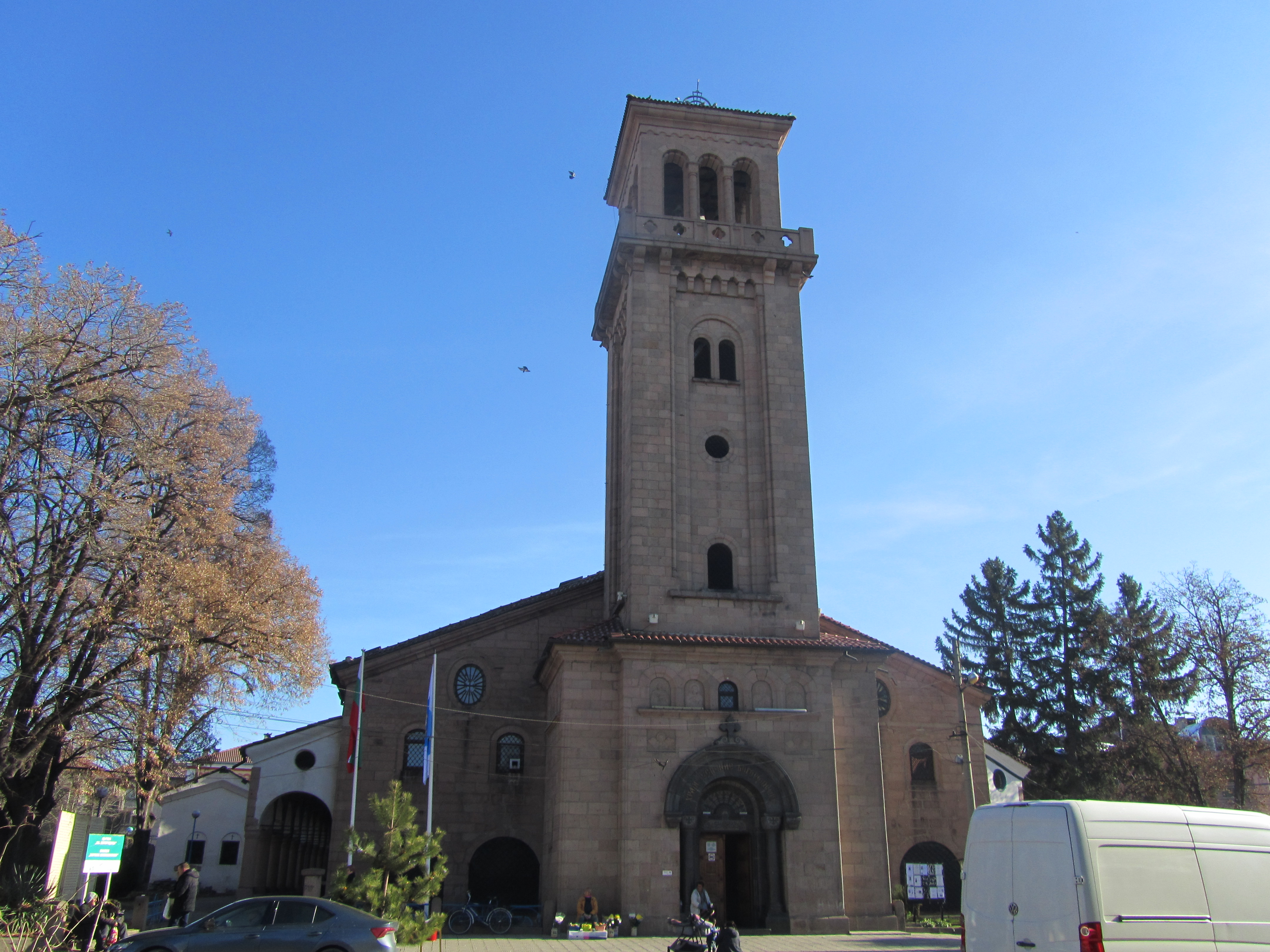
Church of the Dormition of the Mother of God

The church is an Eastern Orthodox church located in the quarter. It is the largest renaissance church in the entirety of Bulgaria, occupying an area of 1140 m^{2}. During the 19th century the church was flooded multiple times due to heavy rain. In 1964 it was listed in the 100 Tourist Sites of Bulgaria and was declared an architectural and artistic monument of national importance. Major restoration was carried out in the period 1998–2001.

The building itself was built by architects Petar Kazov from the nearby town Peshtera, his brother Dimitar, Kuzman Michov and Nikola Tonchev from Bratsigovo. The church is known for its architecture and iconostasis. Typical for the Bulgarian Revivalism, it was built as a three aisled pseudo-basilica without a dome. The roof is double sided with a bell tower. Its wood-carved iconostasis is protected by UNESCO. It strives for fine artistic feeling and craftsmanship.

=== Chitalishte Videlina ===
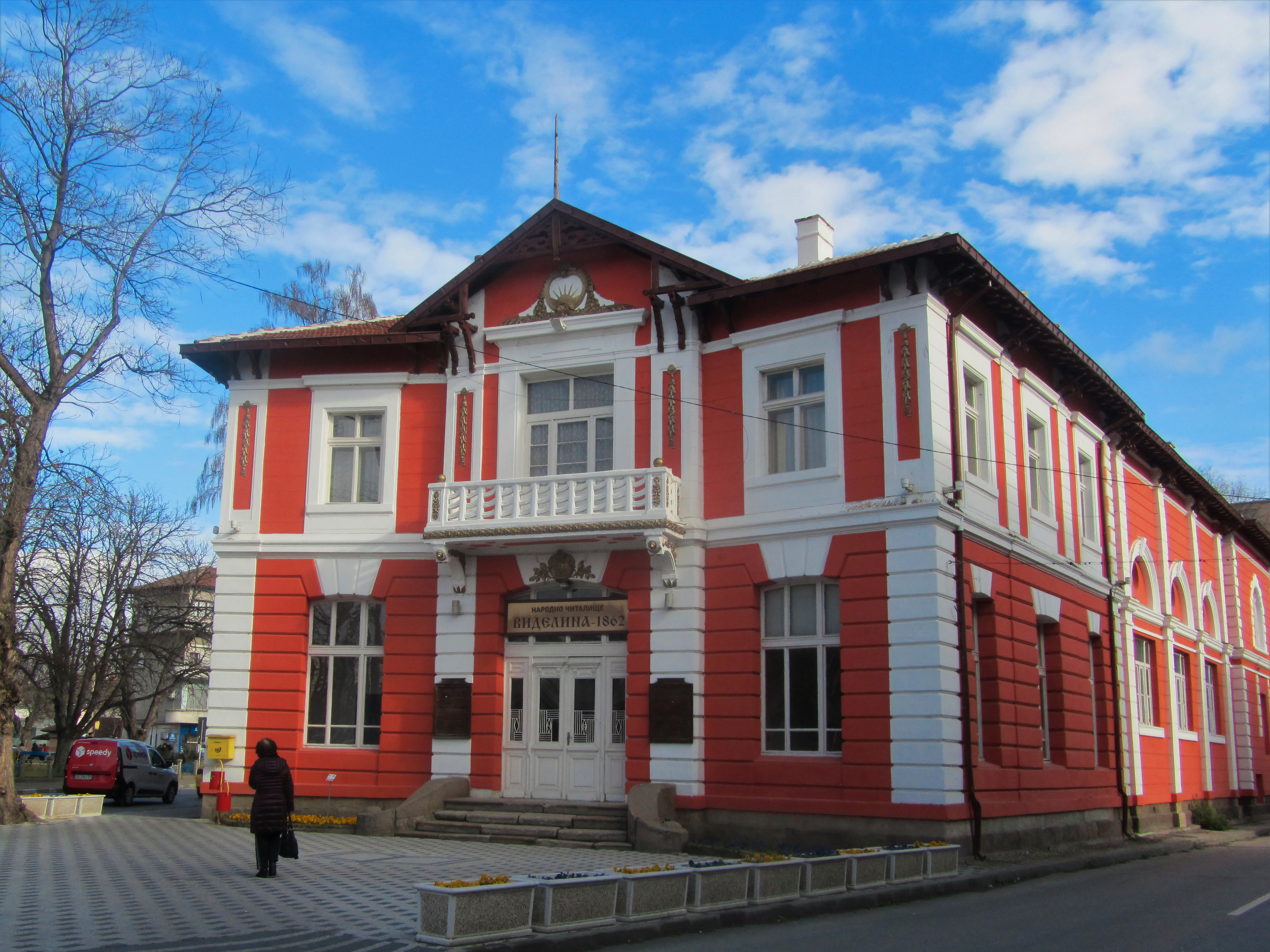
Community centre (chitalishte) Videlina

The community centre was built with a loan from a Viennese bank and donations from the citizens of Pazardzhik after the community board took the initiative to construct a building in 1896. Architectural plans were made by Nikola Lazarov. It was finished in 1904. The building has a library, reading room, theatre hall, make-up rooms and buffets. The community centre began to expand its cultural and educational activities and support other cultural organisations in the town. The community centre also participates in many cultural activities with its lessons such as on ballet and piano.

The facades are designed in the spirit of neo-historicism, with rusticated plaster and smoothly grouted on the ground floor, stucco embellishment including medallions, consoles with lion heads, garlands, pilasters, and cornices. The north facade was later enclosed with a concrete colonnade on the ground floor.

== Sources ==
- Pazardzhik Municipality (2011). Encyclopedia Pazardzhik (in Bulgarian). Pazardzhik. ISBN 978-954-684-308-1.
- Arnaudov, Aleksandar (2009). Cathedral "Dormition of the Mother of God" (in Bulgarian). Pazardzhik: Belloprint. ISBN 978-954-684-224-4.
- Boykov, Grigor (2008). From the founding of the town to the end of the XVII century. Research and documents (in Bulgarian). Plovdiv: Zhanet 45. ISBN 978-954-92291-1-0.
- Gavrilova, Elena (1999). Bulgarian urban culture in the 18th and 19th centuries. Cranbury: Susquehanna University Press. ISBN 1575910152.
- Georgieva, Elena; Kuzmanova, Kapka (2016). The Ancient Quarter of Varosha - Eternal Love in the Heart of Cities (in Bulgarian). Lovech: InfoVision. ISBN 978-954-8105-77-4.
- Grozdanova, Elena (2001). Turkish sources for Bulgarian history (in Bulgarian). Vol. 8. General Directorate of Archives under the Council of Ministers. ISBN 978-954-9800-14-2.
- Kantarev, Konstantin (2019). The Spring of a Town. Pazardzhik Mosaic (2nd ed.). Belloprint. ISBN 978-954-684-444-6.
- Nikolova, Kapka (2006). Bulgaria. Tour Guide. Tangra TanNakRa. ISBN 9549942996.
- Orachev, Atanas; Handzhiyski, Antoniy (2005). Pazardzhik: Nine millennia of civilization. Sofia: Borina Publishing House. ISBN 954-500-161-5.
- Zahariev, Stefan (1870). Geographical historical statistical description of the Tatar Pazardzhik kaza (in Bulgarian). Vienna: L. Sommer.
