= Todor Popov =

Bulgarian politician

- Тодор Попов
- Popov in 2023

Mayor of Pazardzhik
- In office 4 November 2007 – 16 November 2023
- Preceded by: Ivan Evstatiev
- Succeeded by: Petar Kulenski

Personal details
- Born: Todor Dimitrov Popov; 26 December 1967 (age 58) Peshtera, PR Bulgaria
- Party: Independent
- Education: Sofia University
- Occupation: Politician; jurist

Todor Dimitrov Popov (Bulgarian: Тодор Димитров Попов; born 26 December 1967) is a Bulgarian politician and jurist who served four terms as mayor of Pazardzhik from 4 November 2007 to 16 November 2023.

== Biography ==
=== Early life and career ===
Todor Dimitrov Popov was born in Peshtera, Pazardzhik Province on 26 December 1967. He graduated from Atanas Chengelev Vocational Secondary School of Food and Beverage Technology in his home town and from the Faculty of Law in Sofia University.

Popov served as a junior judge for a year in 1991 in the regional court in Pazardzhik and as a district judge from 1992 to 1995 in the district court. From 1995 to 2007 he worked as a lawyer.

=== Political career ===
From 1999 to 2007 Popov was a member of the Pazardzhik Municipal Council, serving as its chairman from 2003 to 2007. In the 2007 local elections he was elected mayor of the town as an independent candidate, nominated by the Coalition of Pazardzhik, beating Ivan Evstatiev of the Bulgarian Socialist Party (BSP) in the second round of voting.

During his first term, in 2008, Popov accused the Municipal Council for delaying proposals and forming a political alliance against him, which the then-chairman Ivan Ivanov denied, stating that the council was working in the interest of the town's citizens. A year later, Popov dismissed Angel Velkov as deputy mayor for humanitarian policy along with several cultural institution directors and proposed abolishing the deputy mayor position as part of his reform plan.

He was re-elected as an independent in the 2011 local elections. During his second mandate, Popov, supported by GERB and the Movement for Rights and Freedoms (DPS), was elected chairman of the National Association of Municipalities in the Republic of Bulgaria, defeating Krasimir Mirev of BSP. In the 2015 local elections he won against Nayden Shopov of GERB in the runoff. In 2019 he led the first round and was re-elected nominated by the local coalition Novoto Vreme.

In the first round of the 2023 local elections, Popov led against Petar Kulenski of We Continue the Change–Democratic Bulgaria. However, Kulenski won the runoff and was elected as mayor.

Despite the electoral defeat, Popov kept influence in the Pazardzhik Municipal Council. In July 2025 the Supreme Administrative Court annulled the October 2023 council election because of significant violations and the previous council, dominated by the group around Popov, was reinstated. In the repeat election on 12 October 2025 the DPS–New Beginning coalition came first, while Popov's list won three seats.
