= 2003 Bulgarian local elections =

← 1999	26 October and 2 November 2003	2007 →
Party	BSP	SDS	NDSV
Provincial Mayoralities	10	9	2
Provincial Mayoralities +/–	▼4	▼2	▲2
Party	DPS	Others
Provincial Mayoralities	1	5
Provincial Mayoralities +/–	▲1	▲3

Local elections were held in all municipalities in Bulgaria on 26 October 2003 (first round) and on 2 November 2003 (second round). Voters elected municipal mayors, village mayors and members of municipal councils of 265 municipalities.

== Results ==
2003 Sofia City Council election
- 26 October 2003
- All 61 seats to Sofia City Council; 31 seats needed for a majority
Party	Leader	Vote %	Seats	+/–
BSP	Bozhidar Dimitrov	26.6	19	+5
SDS	Nadezhda Mihaylova	23.3	16	−11
SSD	Stefan Sofiyanski	21.0	15	+15
BZNS-NS–DP	Lyuben Dilov Jr.	9.7	7	+7
NDSV	Vasil Ivanov - Lucciano	6.1	4	+4
This lists parties that won seats. See the complete results below.

BSP received roughly 33% of the vote, SDS 21%, DPS and NDSV 10%. This was the first time that the BSP received the most votes for elections to the Sofia City Council
