= Mayor of Pazardzhik =

- Кмет на Пазарджик
- Coat of arms of Pazardzhik

- Flag of Pazardzhik

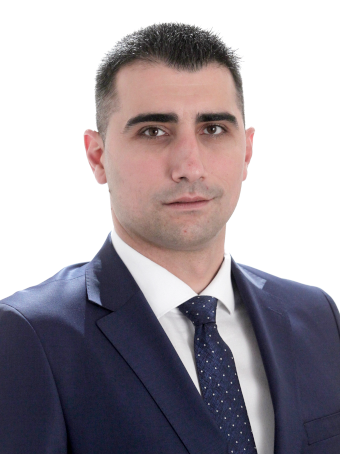
- Incumbent; Petar Kulenski since 16 November 2023
- Inaugural holder: Ivan Chunchev
- Formation: 14 January 1878
- Website: https://pazardzhik.bg/en/mayor

The mayor of Pazardzhik (Bulgarian: Кмет на Пазарджик) is the head of the Pazardzhik Municipality. The current title holder is Petar Kulenski, who has been mayor since 16 November 2023.

== List of mayors of Pazardzhik ==
Chronological list of mayors since 1878
Portrait	Name	Starting year of mandate	Ending year of mandate	Notes
	Ivan Chunchev	14 January 1878	22 February 1878	
	Mihalaki Velichkov	March 1878	February 1879	
	Georgi Bregov	February 1879	April 1880	
	Konstantin Balsamadzhiev	April 1880	August 1884	
	Georgi Penev	August 1884	December 1886	
	Hadzhi Rashko Hadzhiyliev	December 1886	December 1887	
	Georgi Penev	December 1887	October 1893	Second mandate
	Yakov Matakiev	November 1893	September 1894	
	Stefan Konsulov	September 1894	December 1899	
	Atanas Abadzhiev	December 1899	July 1901	
	Angel Goranov	August 1901	December 1901	
	Kostadin Kuzmov	December 1901	1902	
	Stefan Konsulov	1902	1903	Second mandate
	Georgi Yurtov	1903	1908	
	Konstantin Vasilev	1908	1911	
	Ivan Koprivshki	1911	August 1914	
	Filip Yankov	August 1914	January 1915	
	Ivan Koprivshki	January 1915	December 1917	Second mandate
	Spas Kovachev	January 1918	January 1919	
	Todor Nenchev	January 1919	June 1919	
	Atanas Apostolov	June 1919	July 1919	
	Ivan Iliev	July 1919	December 1919	
	Kostadin Karagyozov	December 1919	February 1920	
	Nikola Panov	March 1920	May 1920	
	Georgi Yurtov	May 1920	May 1921	Second mandate
	Krastyo Mashev	June 1921	November 1921	
	Nikola Panov	November 1921	March 1923	Second mandate
	Georgi Kraychev	March 1923	June 1923	
	Ivan Iliev	June 1923	November 1923	Second mandate
	Mihail Krivoshiev	November 1923	July 1926	
	Hristo Ivanov	July 1926	October 1926	
	Petar Gagov	October 1926	May 1927	
	Georgi Bozhkov	May 1927	May 1928	
	Georgi Barakov	May 1928	December 1928	
	Aleksandar Tsonkov	December 1928	March 1932	
	Todor Nenchev	March 1932	July 1933	
	Mihail Trendafilov	July 1933	June 1934	
	Georgi Kenderov	June 1934	February 1938	
	Toma Yanchev	February 1938	June 1943	
	Atanas Popov	June 1943	January 1944	
	Vasil Kodukov	February 1944	March 1945	
	Stefan Yanev	April 1945	November 1945	
	Georgi Garbev	November 1945	November 1946	
	Stoyan Tanev	October 1946	May 1949	
	Ivan Totlyakov	June 1949	August 1950	
	Iliya Kosev	16 September 1950	29 January 1959	
	Stoyan Kavrakov	7 February 1959	6 April 1959	
	Vladimir Georgiev	17 April 1959	22 February 1966	
	Stoyan Kavrakov	9 March 1966	31 May 1971	Second mandate
	Stoyanka Krastenova	July 1971	January 1973	
	Stoitsa Vardin	22 February 1973	20 April 1978	
	Kostadin Mashev	25 May 1978	8 June 1986	
	Ivan Shumanov	8 June 1986	28 February 1988	
	Dimitar Nanov	7 March 1988	6 November 1990	
	Spas Klisurski	November 1990	22 October 1991	
	Georgi Terzov	November 1991	October 1995	
	Slavi Genov	November 1995	October 1999	
	Ivan Kolchakov	November 1999	October 2003	
	Ivan Evstatiev	November 2003	October 2007	
	Todor Popov	4 November 2007	16 November 2023	
	Petar Kulenski	16 November 2023		
