= Ivan Chunchev =

- Иван Чунчев
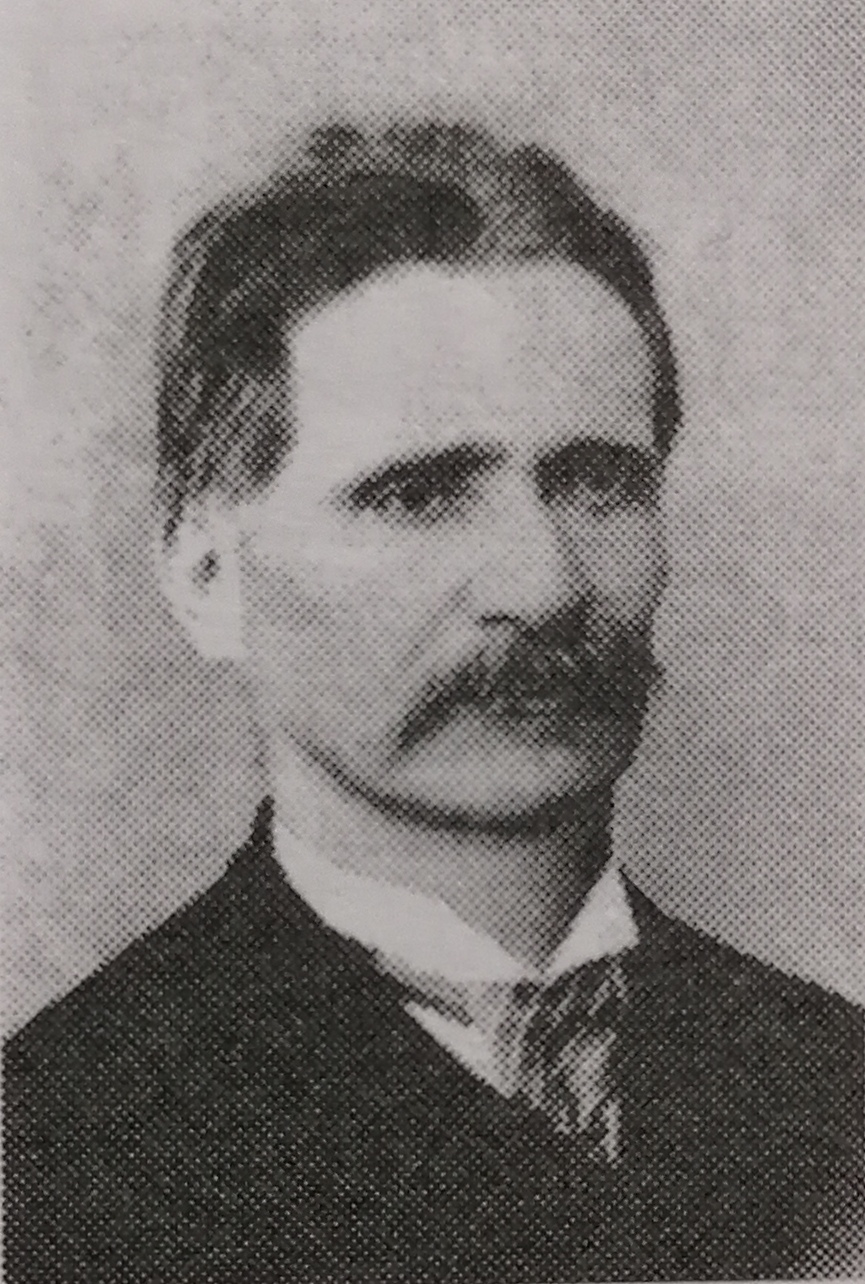

Mayor of Pazardzhik
- In office 14 January 1878 – 22 February 1878
- Preceded by: Office established
- Succeeded by: Mihalaki Velichkov

Personal details
- Born: June 23, 1844 Patalenitsa, Ottoman Empire
- Died: January 15, 1940 (aged 95) Pazardzhik, Kingdom of Bulgaria

Ivan Georgiev Chunchev (Bulgarian: Иван Георгиев Чунчев) was a Bulgarian public official, teacher and lawyer.

== Biography ==
=== Early life and education ===
Chunchev was born in Patalenitsa. He first got his primary education in his native village, after which he was sent to study in a monastery in Krichim in 1853. In 1861, he went to a class school of Yoakim Gruev in Plovdiv. He was fluent in Bulgarian, Turkish, Persian, Arabic and Russian. He began his teaching career firstly in Kalofer from 1867 to 1872, in Plovdiv from 1872 to 1873. He was a trader.

=== Mayoralty ===
After the liberation of Pazardzhik, together with Petko Radomirov and Alexa Daskalov, they went to Plovdiv, to the headquarters of the Russian troops, and sent a written request from the people of Pazardzhik to help them in establishing order in the town and to organize the election of a legitimate civil government. On 21–22 January 1878, the first city government was elected and he was the first elected mayor. He then resigned because he went to Plovdiv and enrolled in the courses for civil servants.

=== Late years ===
He was interned in Balnubar (today Kubrat), where he worked as an intern judge. At the same place, he participated in a creation of a chitalishte with 8 other people.
