= Petar Kulenski =

Bulgarian politician (born 1986)

- Петър Куленски
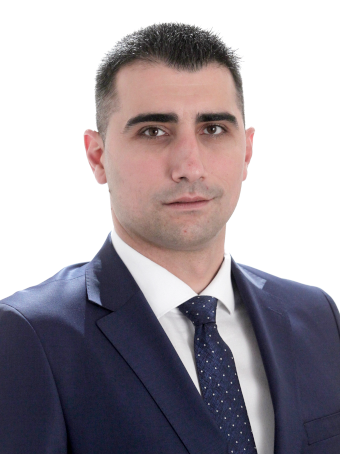
- Official portrait, 2021

Mayor of Pazardzhik
- Incumbent
- Assumed office 16 November 2023
- Preceded by: Todor Popov

Member of the National Assembly
- In office 3 December 2021 – 9 November 2023
- Constituency: 13th MMC - Pazardzhik

Personal details
- Born: Petar Nikolaev Kulenski; 24 January 1986 (age 40) Pazardzhik, PR Bulgaria
- Party: We Continue the Change
- Children: 1
- Education: Sofia University
- Occupation: Politician; attorney

Petar Nikolaev Kulenski is a Bulgarian politician who is the current Mayor of Pazardzhik. A member of the PP party, he previously served as a Member of the National Assembly.
