= 2007 Bulgarian local elections =

| ← 2003 | 28 October and 4 November 2007 | 2011 → |
| Party | BSP | GERB | SDS |
| Provincial Mayoralities | 11 | 10 | 5 |
| Provincial Mayoralities +/– | ▲1 | ▲10 | ▼4 |
| Party | DPS | Others |
| Provincial Mayoralities | 1 | 0 |
| Provincial Mayoralities +/– | Steady | ▼7 |

Local elections were held in all municipalities in Bulgaria on 28 October 2007 (first round) and on 4 November 2007 (second round). Voters elected municipal mayors, village mayors and members of municipal councils of 265 municipalities.

== Results ==
BSP won 11 regional mayorships, GERB, the new party of Sofia Mayor Boyko Borisov, won 10 mayorships, SDS won 5 and DPS 1.

2007 Sofia City Council election
- 28 October 2007
- All 61 seats to Sofia City Council; 31 seats needed for a majority
| Party | Leader | Vote % | Seats | +/– |
|---|---|---|---|---|
| GERB | Yordanka Fandakova | 46.6 | 33 | +33 |
| BSP | Georgi Kadiev | 16.6 | 12 | −7 |
| SDS-DSB-SSD | Martin Zaimov | 15.7 | 11 | −20 |
| Ataka | Dancho Hadzhiev | 4.8 | 3 | +3 |
| NDSV | Antonia Parvanova | 2.2 | 2 | −2 |
This lists parties that won seats. See the complete results below.
