= Church of the Dormition of the Mother of God, Pazardzhik =

Church of the Dormition of the Mother of God
- Успение Богородично
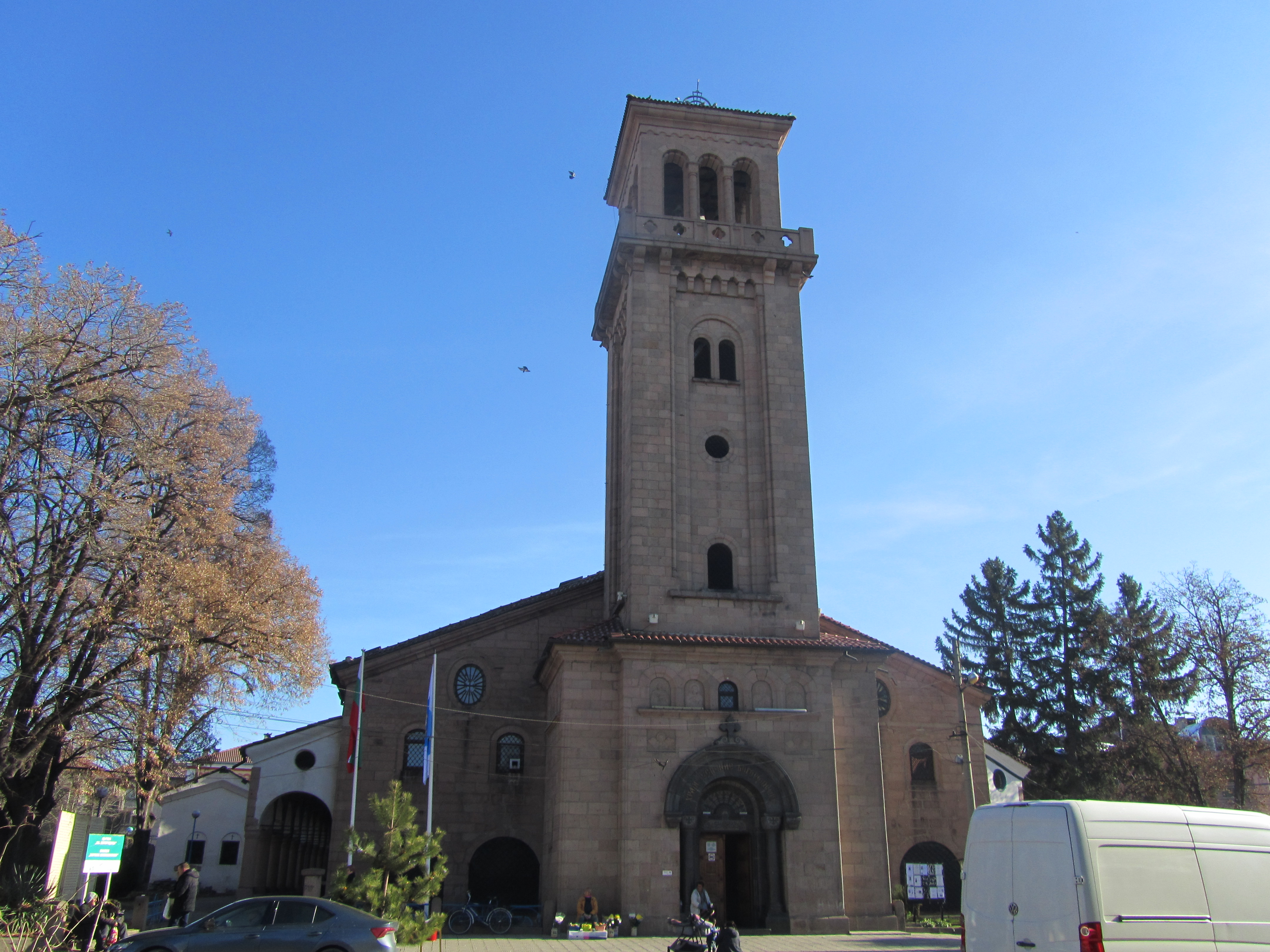
- Church of the Dormition of the Mother of God
- 42.18730°N 24.32516°E
- Location: Pazardzhik
- Country: Bulgaria
- Denomination: Eastern Orthodox

History
- Founded: 1837
- Consecrated: 1841

Architecture
- Functional status: Active
- Architects: Petar Kazov; Dimitar Kazov; Nikola Tonchev; Kuzman Michov
- Architectural type: Bulgarian Revival
- Completed: 1914

Specifications
- Length: 37.7 m
- Width: 22.9 m
- Height: 16 m
- Materials: Rhyolite

Administration
- Diocese: Plovdiv

Church of the Dormition of the Mother of God (Bulgarian: Успение Богородично, romanized: Uspenie Bogorodichno) is an Eastern Orthodox church located in Pazardzhik, Bulgaria. It is one of the main symbols and cultural sights in the city and also in the 100 Tourist Sites of Bulgaria.

== History ==
=== First reports ===
The history of the church dates back to first half of the 17th century, mentioned in Ottoman reports. The first church building then was small, wooden and dug deep into the ground. In 1680, Luigi Marsili mentioned that in the town, there was a church called ''St Mary''. In the 18th century, the church was a centre of literature, where liturgical books were written. The only bishop in the town was Dionysius of Agathonice, serving from the 17th century to 1827. Many changes were made during the first church's period, as a large halo cross was made in 1715 and an iron cross in 1765. In 1790, during the Russo-Turkish War, the church was destroyed by janissaries. Another church was built in 1801-1806 by Dionysius and the local chief of the town with donations by the local christian population, which was then destroyed in 1807 by Ottoman soldiers.

Another temple was already the predecessor of the present building serving Varosha since its construction in 1815. The building was burnt as a result of the Varosha fire. A makeshift chapel then was built in 1835.

=== Present building ===
The present church building was constructed between 1836 and 1837. The year 1837 was marked the official completion date in 1837. The consecration of the church took place either in 1840 or 1841. During consecration, the church wasn't completely finished. In 1904, the large fence around it was demolished. Inside the church two chapels were partitioned off - ''St. Nicholas" and "St. Archangel". In July 1906, construction of the bell tower began. Tako Reyanov began the first work on the foundations in June. For financial reasons, the construction was delayed and prolonged. There were three stages - the first stage from 10 July 1927 to 6 August 1929. The second one was from 10 November 1931 to 13 August 1932 and the third from 19 November 1932 to 16 November 1933. The cost was 925,682.32 BGN.

In 1914 the church was painted inside and outside by the grandson of Makri Frachkovski - Apostol Hristov, and his partner G. Zhelyazkov.

In the second half of the 20th century the church was flooded four times after heavy rains. The first time was on 10 March 1954, when the water knocked out the floorboards in the church. The well in the church also overflowed. The second time - the same day 10 March 1955 the church was flooded again. The third time - at the end of June 1957, when the water flooded the floor of the church up to 80 cm.The fourth time, on 5 and 6 September 1957, after a natural flood, when the water flooded the church floor to a height of 1.20 m and the iconostasis to a height of 80 cm.

In 1964, the church was declared an architectural and artistic monument of national importance and included in the 100 Tourist Sites of Bulgaria. Several detailed researches were made by the National Institute for Cultural Monuments (NICM) between 1980 and 1990. The last major restoration was carried out in 1998-2000. Minor repairs were made in 2001-2007.

== Architecture ==
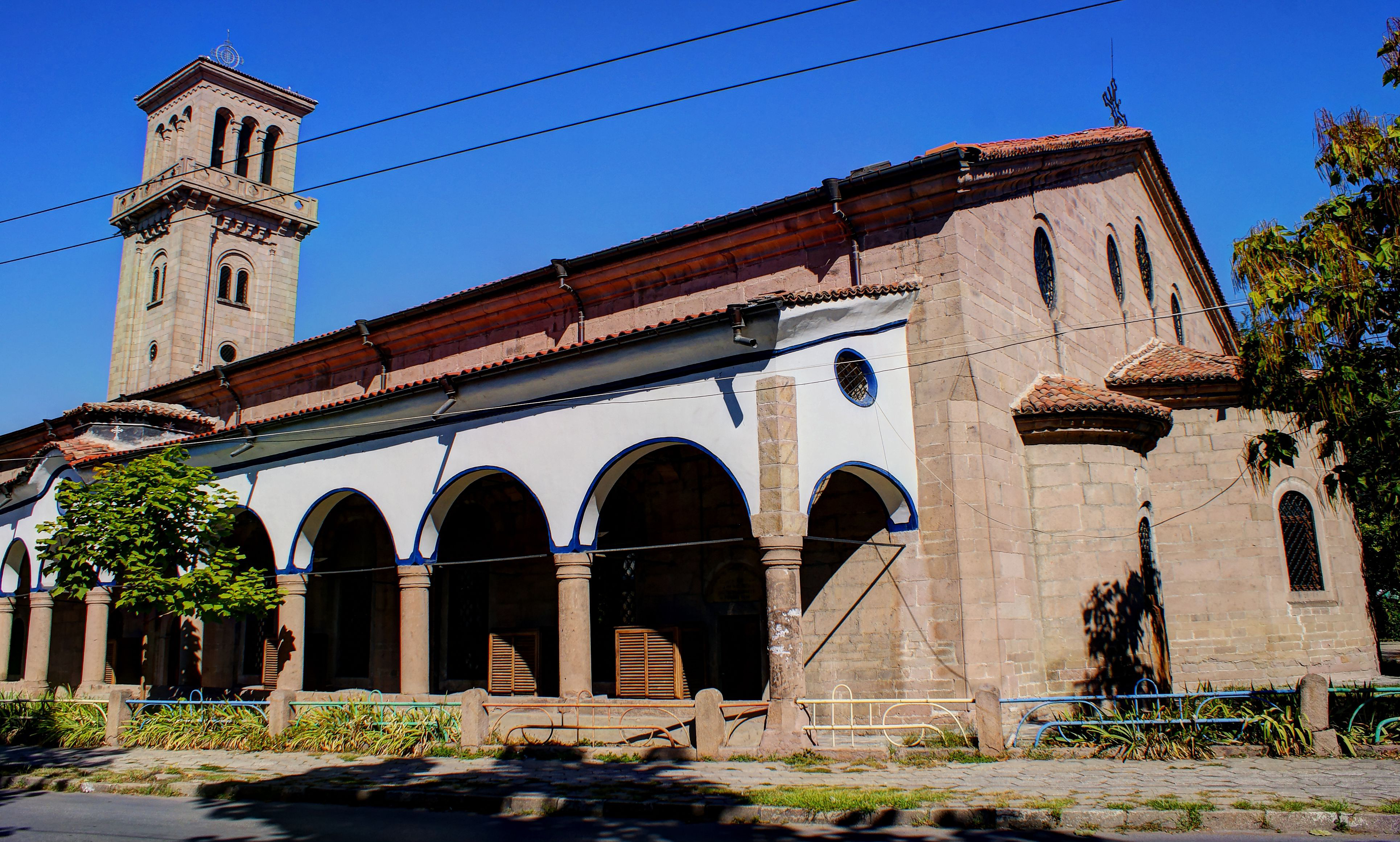
Back facade of the church

The church's architecture is Bulgarian Revivalism, considered the biggest church with the architectural type. The building was constructed by master architects from Peshtera Petar Kazov, his brother Dimitar and their fellow resident Kuzman Michov. Nikola Tonchev also participated in the construction, who is a native of Bratsigovo.

The church is well known for its wooden iconostasis carvings. It is also known for its architecture and dimensions. According to architect Peyo Berbenliev, it has dimensions of 22.90 x 37.70 m. Outside, it is 14.50 m high and 16 m inside. It occupies an area of 1140 m². It was built as a three aisled pseudo-basilica, but without a dome, typical for the Bulgarian Revival architectures during the 1830s.

The roof is double sided with a bell tower later built after the Liberation. The altar is three sided.

Most of the frescoes in the church were made in the later period. The original frescoes of high artistic value in the building are found only in the chapels and in the lower parts of the inner terrace.The oldest frescoes date back to 1838, when the church was painted, according to the surviving inscription on the roof.

The iconostasis is protected by UNESCO. It was made by masters led by Makriy Negriyev Fruchkovski, whose grave is behind the altar of the church. The frescoes were made by representatives of the Samokov school and has icons by Dospevski.

It preserves the most impressive icons in Bulgaria by master artists of the Debar School, wood-carvings of New and Old Testament scenes, and icons by Stanislav Dospevski. The oldest icon is from 1815 - the icon of Dionysius - while the newest from 1914.
