= Stoyanka Krastenova =

Bulgarian politician (born 1935)

- Стоянка Кръстенова

Mayor of Pazardzhik
- In office July 1971 – January 1973
- Preceded by: Stoyan Kavrakov
- Succeeded by: Stoitsa Vardin

Personal details
- Born: May 11, 1935 (age 91) Pazardzhik, Kingdom of Bulgaria

Stoyanka Dimitrova Krastenova (Bulgarian: Стоянка Димитрова Кръстенова) is a Bulgarian former politician.

== Biography ==
=== Early life and education ===
Krastenova was born on 11 May 1935 in Pazardzhik, Kingdom of Bulgaria. She graduated from a polytechnic institute in Leningrad as a mechanical engineer in 1959. She was a teacher at the Mathematical High School Konstantin Velichkov from 1963 to 1967.

=== Political career ===
She was a member of the Bulgarian Communist Party since 1962. She was mayor of Pazardzhik from 1971 to 1973. During this period, in her first term, 7 residential blocks with 392 apartments were built. In her second term, also 7 with 336 apartments. Enterprises for agronomic services with modernly furnished warehouses were established. Four summer bases were built – Prevala, Kurtludzha, Muhuvo and Dobra Voda. At the 14th Extraordinary Congress of the Communist Party of Bulgaria in January 1990, she was elected to the party's Supreme Council.
