= Yakov Matakiev =

Bulgarian politician and revolutionary activist (1852–1921)

- Яков Матакиев
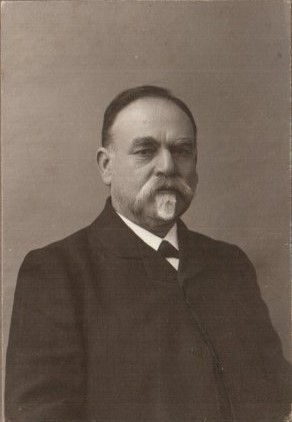

Mayor of Pazardzhik
- In office November 1893 – September 1894
- Preceded by: Georgi Penev
- Succeeded by: Stefan Konsulov

Personal details
- Born: September 12, 1852 Tatar Pazardzhik, Ottoman Empire
- Died: November 7, 1921 (aged 69) Sofia, Kingdom of Bulgaria

Yakov Dimitrov Matakiev (Bulgarian: Яков Димитров Матакиев) was a Bulgarian public figure, politician and revolutionary activist.

== Biography ==
=== Early life and education ===
Yakov Dimitrov Matakiev was born on 13 September 1852 in Tatar Pazardzhik in a family of a rich nobleman. He got his education in his home town and graduated high school in Tábor. He began teaching alongside Konstantin Velichkov.

=== Revolutionary career ===
He would first participate in the April Uprising of 1876, in which the uprising went unsuccessfully and he was arrested in the prisons of Plovdiv and Adrianople. He was then freed after the 1876-1877 amnesty of the Constantinople Conference.

=== Political career ===
For the entire existence of Eastern Rumelia Yakov Matakiev was elected as a deputy and belonged to the party, which at the beginning was called Geshova, and from 1884 (when propaganda for the Unification began) - the Unificationist Party.

Matakiev was also the chairman of the Pazardzhik District Court. He was also mayor of Pazardzhik from 1893 to 1894.
