= Martin Zaimov =

Bulgarian economist and politician (born 1962)

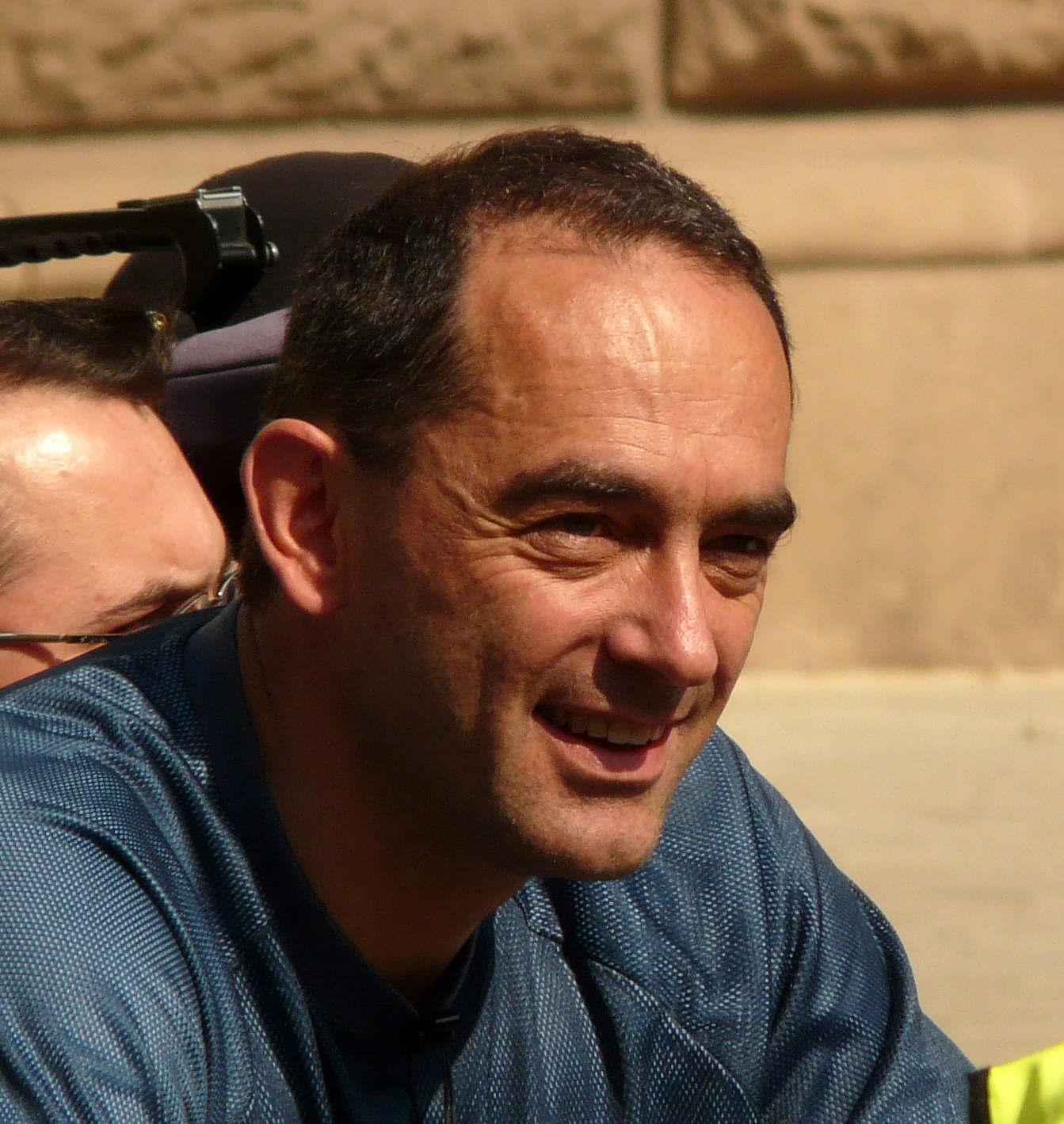

Martin Zaimov (born 16 April 1962) is a Bulgarian financier and politician, former deputy governor of the Bulgarian National Bank (1997-2003) and candidate for mayor of Sofia in 2007.

Zaimov was born in Geneva, Switzerland, where his mother Klavdia Zaimova was working at the World Health Organization. His father was the British long-time Associated Press foreign correspondent Michael Goldsmith. Zaimova and Goldsmith later divorced. Martin Zaimov belongs to the noted Zaimov family: he is the grandson of General Vladimir Zaimov and the great-grandson of revolutionary Stoyan Zaimov.

Zaimov graduated in electronic technology at the Technical University of Sofia, economics at Birkbeck College and European Studies at the London School of Economics. Zaimov has three children, Sara (born in 1993), Thomas (1998) and Zacharie (2009).

Martin Zaimov emigrated from Bulgaria in 1986 but came back after the collapse of the communist regime. He then worked for the French branch of Coopers & Lybrand and later for the international trader Louis Dreyfus.

In 1997, he became vice minister of Commerce in the interim government and introduced sweeping liberalisation to trade by scrapping price controls and customs tariffs. On 1 July 1997, Zaimov was elected Deputy Governor of the Bulgarian National Bank by Parliament and effectively became the person in charge of the Bulgarian currency board.

In 2007, Martin Zaimov ran for Mayor of Sofia, supported by the right-wing Union of the Democratic Forces and Democrats for a Strong Bulgaria. Zaimov came second with 17.77% of votes, behind Boyko Borisov, the founder of GERB who gathered 53.43%. Zaimov then spent 4 years as Deputy Chair of Sofia's Municipal Council. He was instrumental in the city administration's shift in mobility, urban planning and nature preservation policies.

Since 2007, he has been board member of Société Générale-owned Expressbank. Since 2011 he has managed an urban regeneration fund, subsidiary of the bank, financed by the EU JESSICA Initiative.

He has been a member of the boards of trustees of the Institute for Market Economics (1993-2015), the American University in Bulgaria (2000-2010) and the Centre for Advanced Study in Sofia (2008–2016).

Martin Zaimov is a founding member of the Bulgarian Electric Vehicles Association and since then has been an active promoter of electric mobility.
