= 2011 Bulgarian local elections =

← 2007	23 and 30 October 2011	2015 →
Party	GERB	BSP	SDS
Provincial Mayoralities	14	8	3
Provincial Mayoralities +/–	▲4	▼3	▼2
Party	DPS	Others
Provincial Mayoralities	1	1
Provincial Mayoralities +/–	Steady	▲1

Local elections were held in all municipalities in Bulgaria on 23 October 2011 (first round) and on 30 October 2011 (second round). Voters elected municipal mayors, village mayors and members of municipal councils of 265 municipalities. They were held alongside the 2011 presidential election.

== Results ==
GERB won 14 regional mayorships, BSP 8, DPS 1. 4 other incumbent mayors won without the backing of those three parties.

2011 Sofia City Council election
- 23 October 2011
- All 61 seats to Sofia City Council; 31 seats needed for a majority
Party	Leader	Vote %	Seats	+/–
GERB	Andrey Ivanov	48.5	33	0
BSP	Georgi Kadiev	22.4	15	+3
Blue Coalition	Proshko Proshkov	10.8	8	−3
Ataka	Nikolay Pehlivanov	3.2	2	−1
NDSV	Vladimir Karolev	2.5	2	0
IMRO–BNM	Angel Dzhambazki	1.8	1	+1
This lists parties that won seats. See the complete results below.
