= Architecture of the Bulgarian Revival =

The architecture of the Bulgarian Revival is an Ottoman style architecture developed between 1770 and 1900.

Plovdiv's Old Town is a living museum of the type of National Revival architecture that developed there (there were regional differences) in the early to mid-1800.

The roots of the houses of Bulgarian Revival follows a tradition of buildings from the architecture of the Second Bulgarian Empire. There are cities in Bulgaria with preserved Revival architecture are:the old town of Plovdiv, the mountain towns of Tryavna, Kotel, Sopot, Koprivshtitsa, Elena, the old Bulgarian capital - Veliko Tarnovo and others.

== Gallery ==
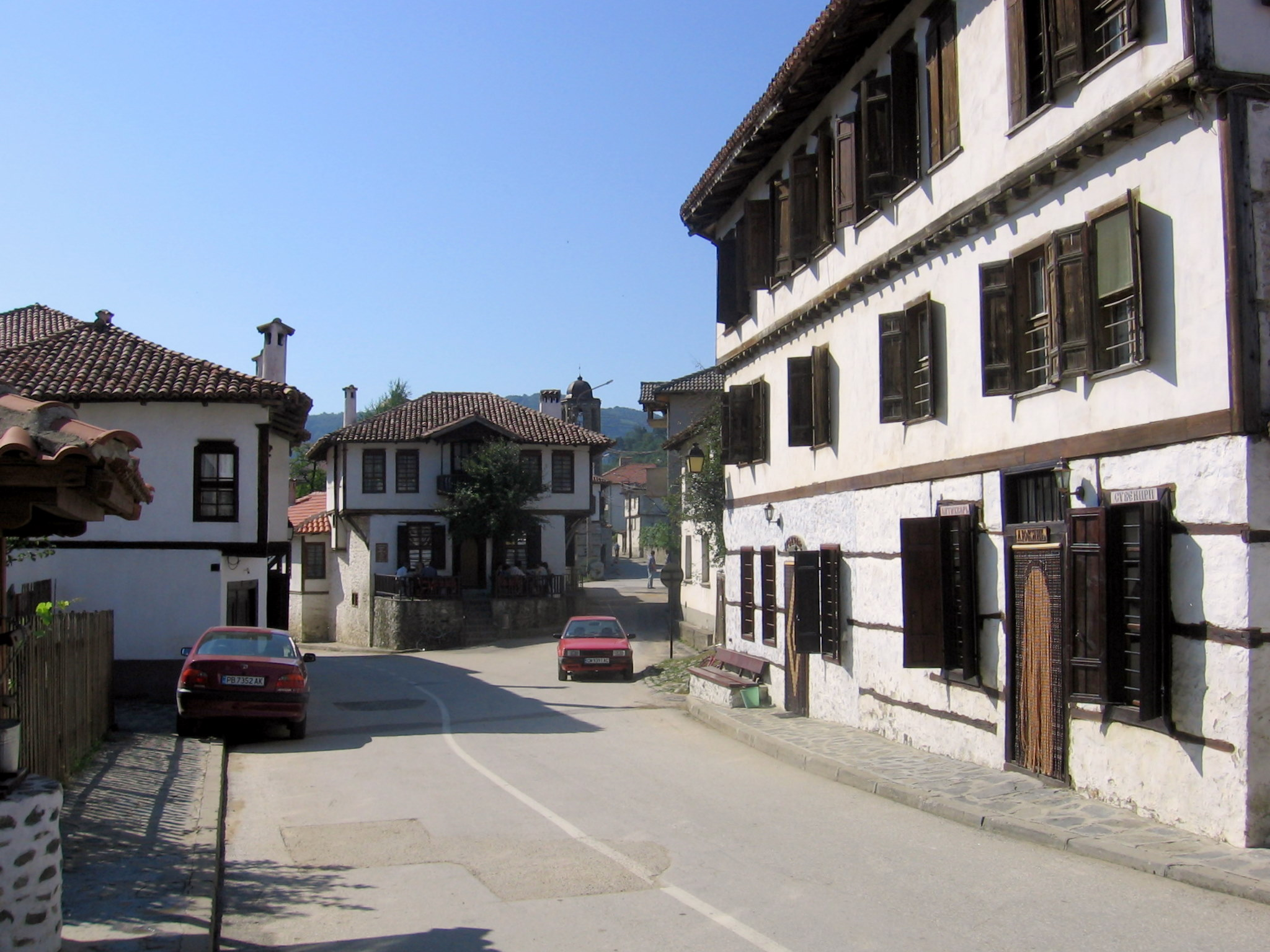
Zlatograd

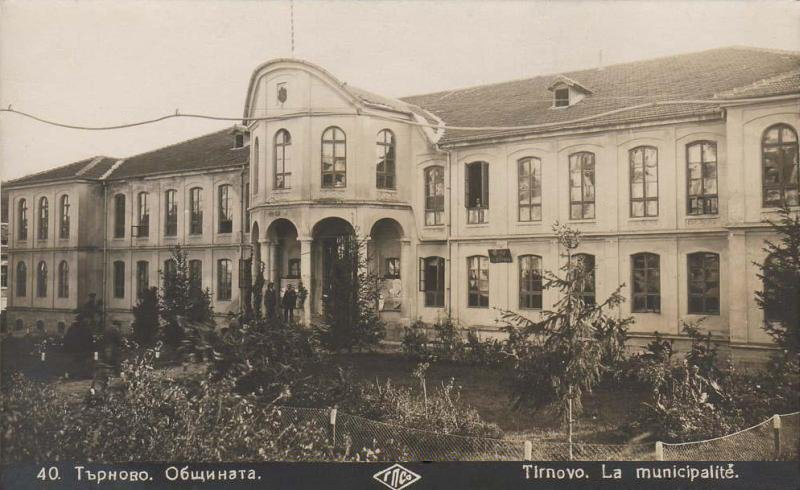
The building of the first Bulgarian Parliament

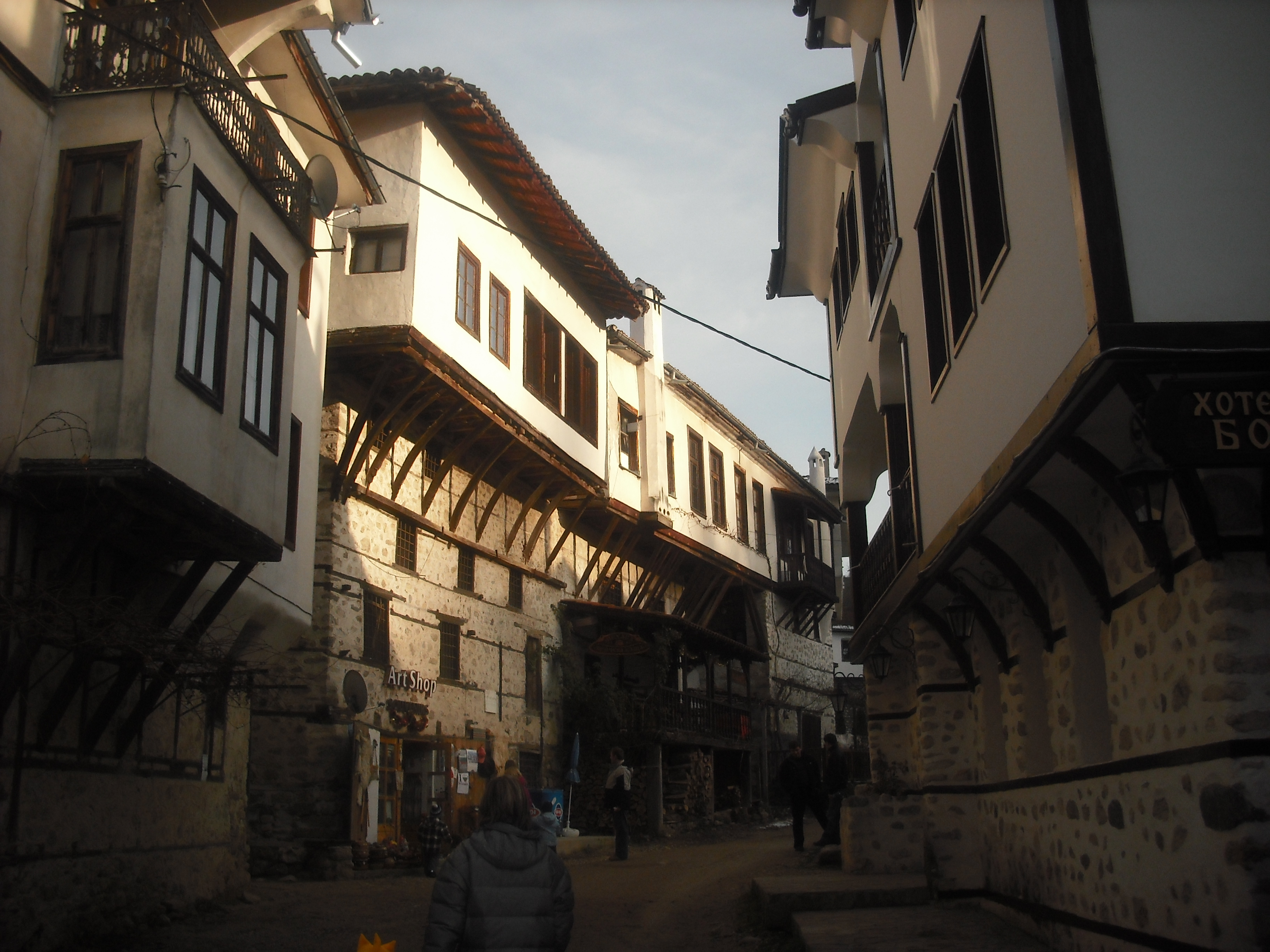
House in the Bulgarian town Melnik

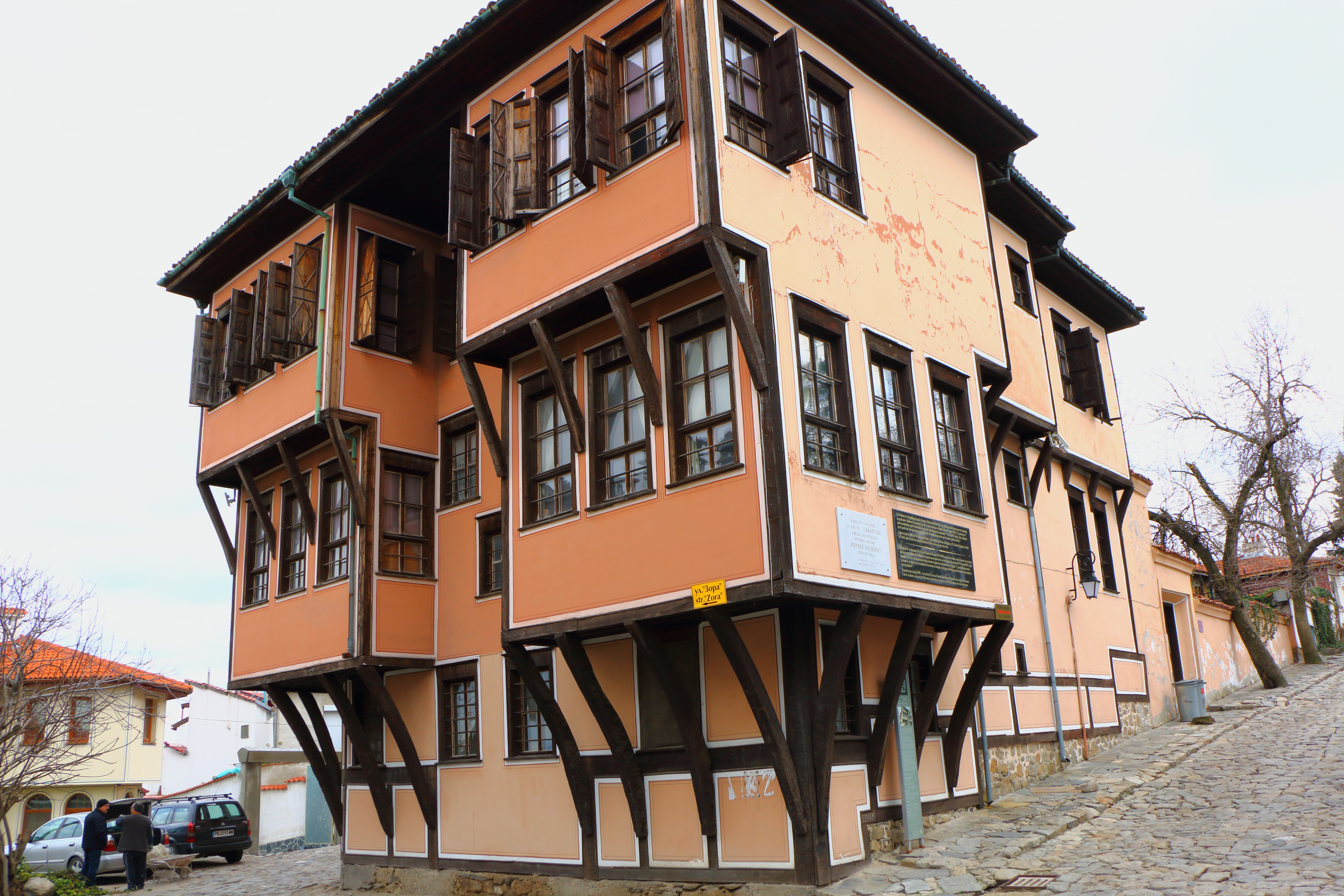

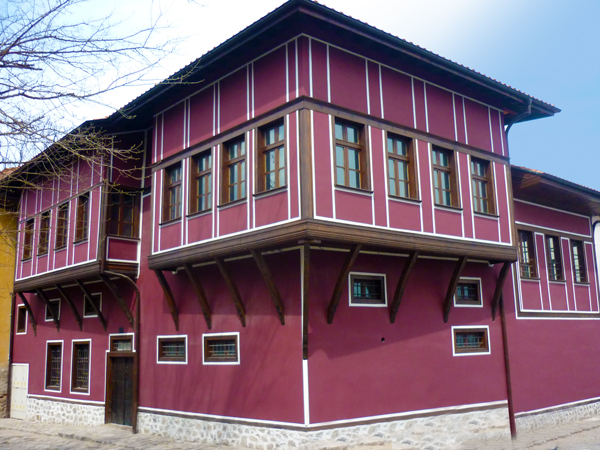

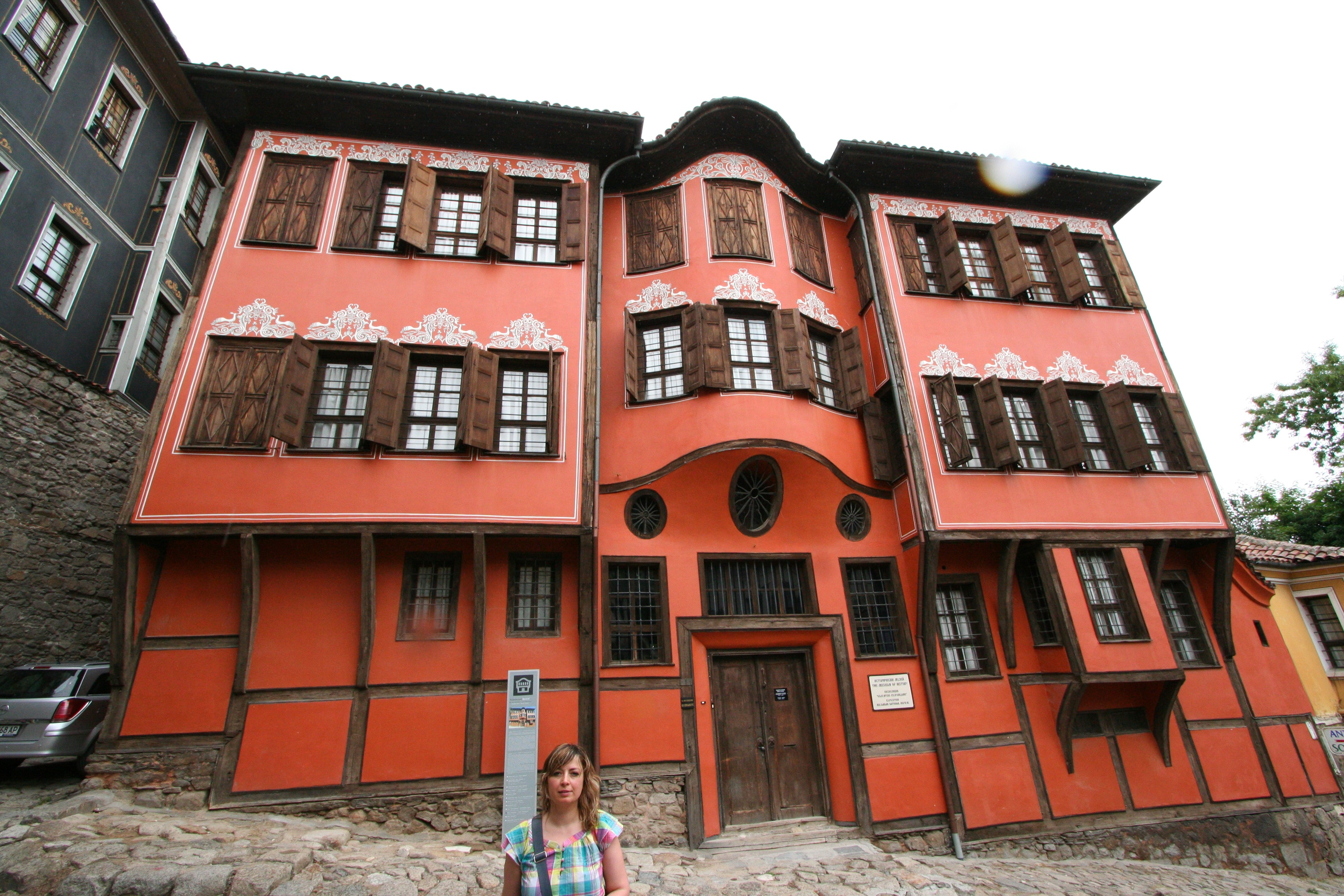

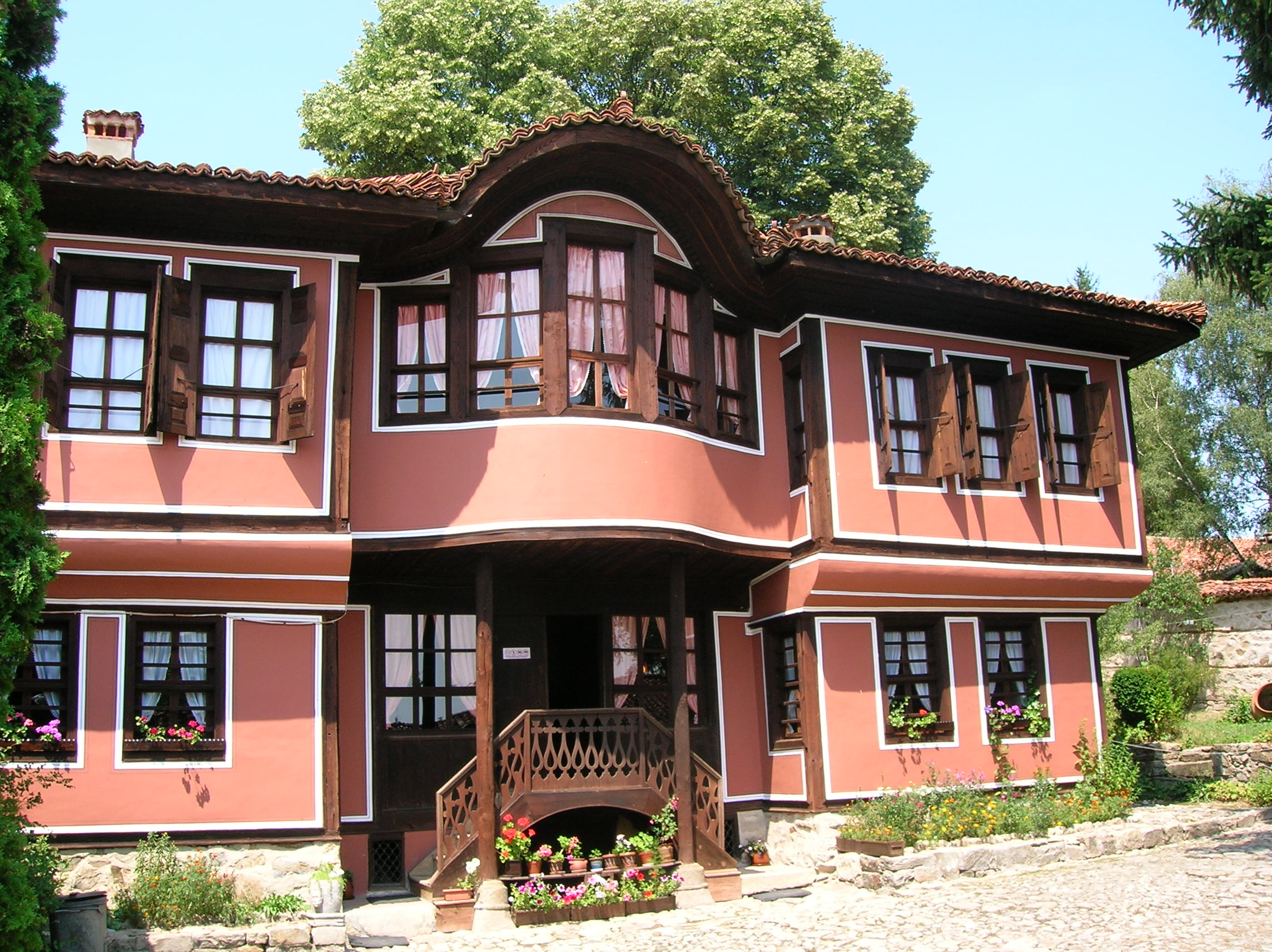

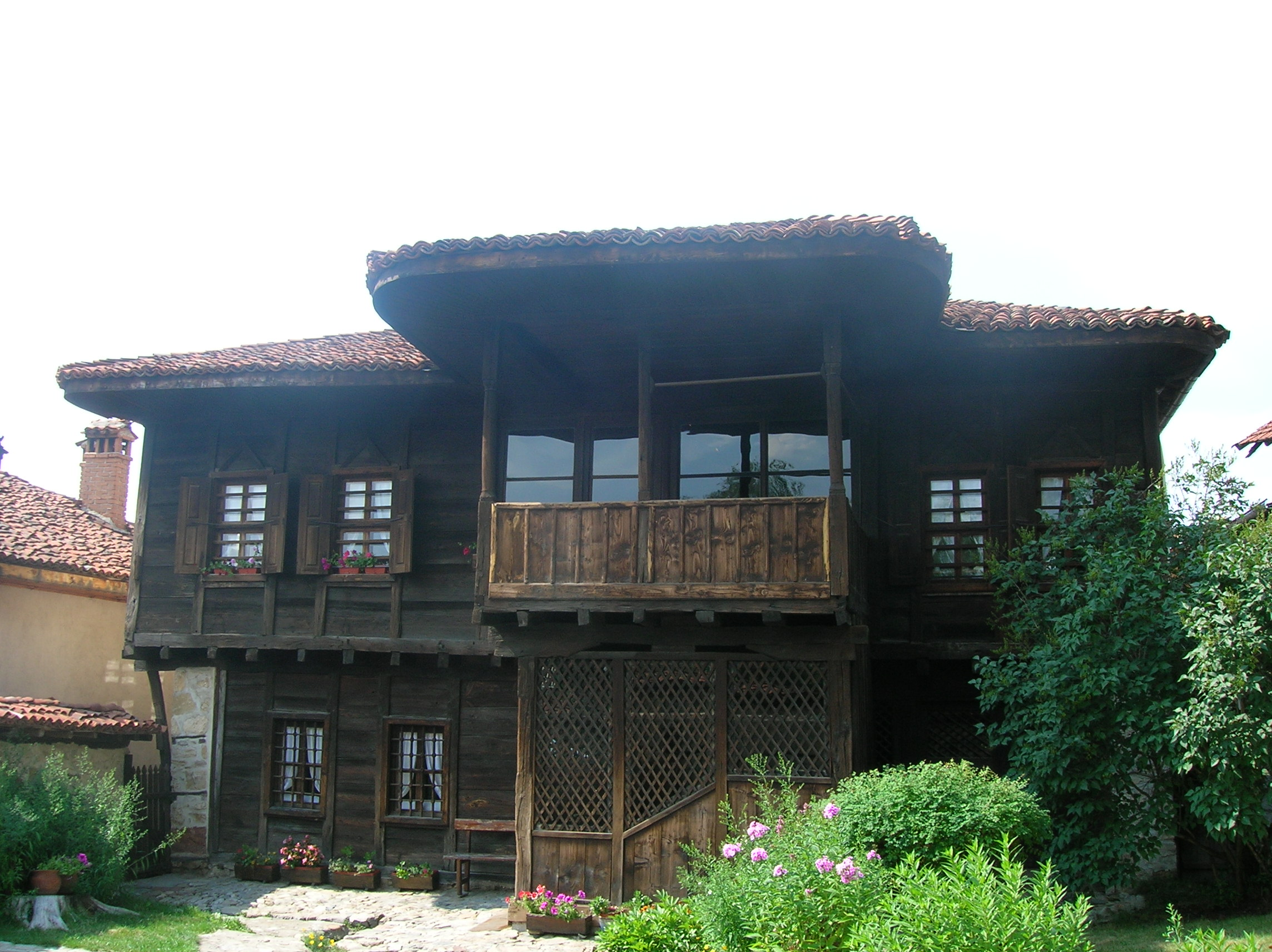

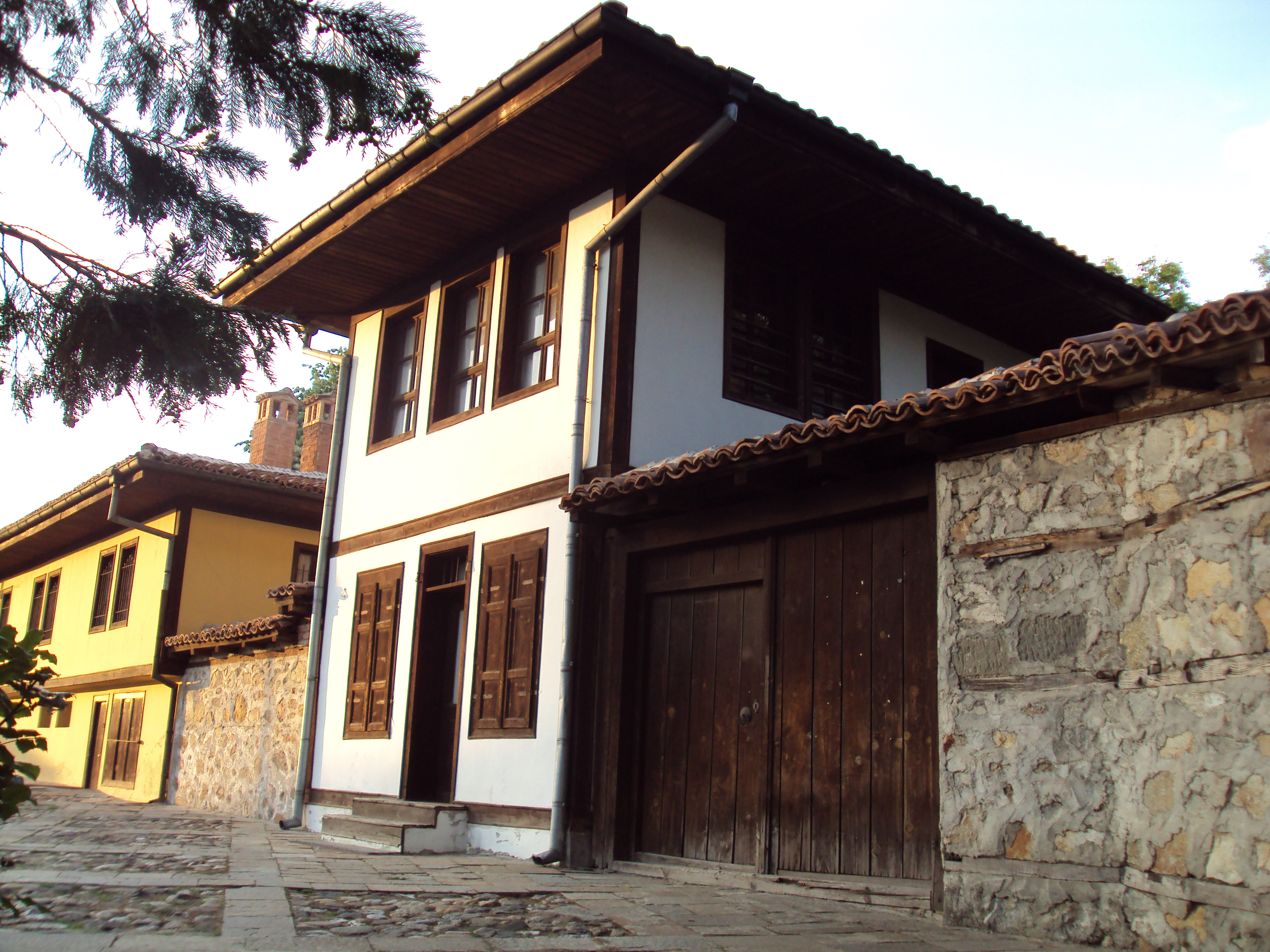
Old house in Panagyurishte
