= Toshkov Chark =

Reservoir in Pazardzhik Province, Bulgaria

Toshkov Chark Dam
- Location of Toshkov Chark in Bulgaria
- Official name: Язовир Тошков чарк (Bulgarian)
- Location: Rhodope Mountains south of Batak
- Coordinates: 41°48′36″N 24°9′54″E
- Construction began: 1954
- Opening date: 1956

Dam and spillways
- Type of dam: stone dam
- Height: 21.6 m (71 ft)
- Length: 82.2 m (270 ft)

Reservoir
- Creates: Toshkov Chark Reservoir
- Total capacity: 1,800,000 m^{3} (1,500 acre⋅ft)
- Catchment area: 31.5 km^{2} (12.2 mi^{2})
- Surface area: 0.3 km^{2} (74 acres)

Toshkov Chark (Bulgarian: Тошков чарк) is a small reservoir situated in the Western Rhodope Mountains of southern Bulgaria, east of the Golyam Beglik and Beglika reservoirs. Its lies in Batak Municipality in the southern part of Pazardzhik Province and forms part of the Batak Hydropower Cascade (254 MW).

The reservoir is situated on the river Devinska reka in the Vacha drainage, at the confluence of its tributaries the Beglishka reka and Selkyupria. It serves as a seasonal equalizer of waters from the catchment of the river under the Gashnya gathering derivation. In addition, a 3.5 m tunnel gathering water from the right tributaries of the Devinska reka flow into Toshkov Chark.

Toshkov Chark was constructed in 1954–1956 and has a 21.6 m high stone dam with a steel screen, reaching length of 82.2 m. The dam forms a lake with an area of 0.3 km^{2} and a volume of 1.3 million m^{3}. It has a 52 m spillway with a maximum spillway capacity of 170 m^{3}/s, and the main outlet is a pipe with a diameter of 600 mm and a capacity of 2.8 m^{3}/s.

The dam has a pumping station, through which its waters are pumped into the main pressure derivation of the Batak Hydro Power Plant or are diverted upstream to Golyam Beglik.

Toshkov Chark is a popular camping and fishing destination. There are abundant fish stocks of river trout, Eurasian carp, crucian carp, European perch, common rudd, etc. There is also a river trout aquaculture.
