= Shiroka Polyana =

Reservoir in Pazardzhik Province, Bulgaria

Shiroka Polyana Dam
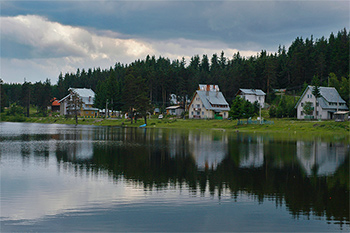

- Location of Shiroka Polyana in Bulgaria
- Official name: Язовир Широка поляна (Bulgarian)
- Location: Rhodope Mountains south of Batak
- Coordinates: 41°46′0.01″N 24°10′0.01″E
- Construction began: 1959
- Opening date: 1962

Dam and spillways
- Type of dam: 1 concrete gravity dam 2 earthen-brick dams 2 earthen dams
- Height: 21.2 m (70 ft)
- Length: 498 m (1,634 ft)

Reservoir
- Creates: Shiroka Polyana Reservoir
- Total capacity: 24,000,000 m^{3} (19,000 acre⋅ft)
- Catchment area: 81 km^{2} (31 mi^{2})
- Surface area: 4.3 km^{2} (1,100 acres)

Shiroka Polyana (Bulgarian: Широка поляна) is a reservoir situated in the Western Rhodope Mountains of southern Bulgaria. Its waters are used for electricity generation and irrigation. Due to its scenic location and abundance of fish, it is a popular tourist destination.

== Geography ==
Shiroka Polyana is located at an altitude of 1,500 m at 30 km south of the town of Batak in Pazardzhik Province, on the second class II-37 road leading to Dospat, which lies 20 km further south. With no settlements in its vicinity, the reservoir is amidst old-growth coniferous forests and is surrounded by three protected areas — Shiroka Polyana to the north-northwest, Studenata Chuchurka to the south-southwest and Kaval Tepe to the east. With its irregular shores, viewed from the road it seems that Shiroka Polyana is composed of numerous small lakes. This illusion is due to the indented relief of the lake bed that consists of several mountain gullies.

Although the banks of the reservoirs are comparatively hard to access, it attracts many visitors and sports fishermen because of the abundance of fish, including native species such as European perch, common chub, river trout, Eurasian carp, crucian carp, Prussian carp, wels catfish and common rudd, as wells as alloctonous ones like grass carp and rainbow trout.

== Dam ==
Shiroka Polyana is the most important structure of the Shiroka Polyana junction of the Batak Hydropower Cascade (254 MW), which includes a system of dams and pumping stations, aimed at collecting water from the upper course of the catchment areas of the rivers Dospat and Vacha, and more specifically, the left tributaries of the latter, the Devinska reka and the Gashnya. The reservoir was constructed in 1959–1962.

Shiroka Polyana, occupies a former grassland meadow and consists of five separate dams at its shores — a concrete gravity dam of the Kireeva River with a height of 21.2 m and a length of 80 m, an earthen dam with a height of 15.7 m and a length of 186 m, an earthen-brick dam with a height of 3.8 m and a length of 57 m, an earthen-brick dam with a height of 2.7 m and a length of 38 m and an earthen dam with a height of 3.55 m and a length of 137 m.

The reservoir covers a surface area of 4.3 km^{2}, with a volume of 24 million m^{3} and an average depth of 6 m. It is linked to the neighbouring Golyam Beglik Reservoir through a tunnel, through which its waters are transferred to the Batak Hydropower Cascade, to be utilized for electricity generation along its three power plants and for irrigation in the Upper Thracian Plain.

== Gallery ==
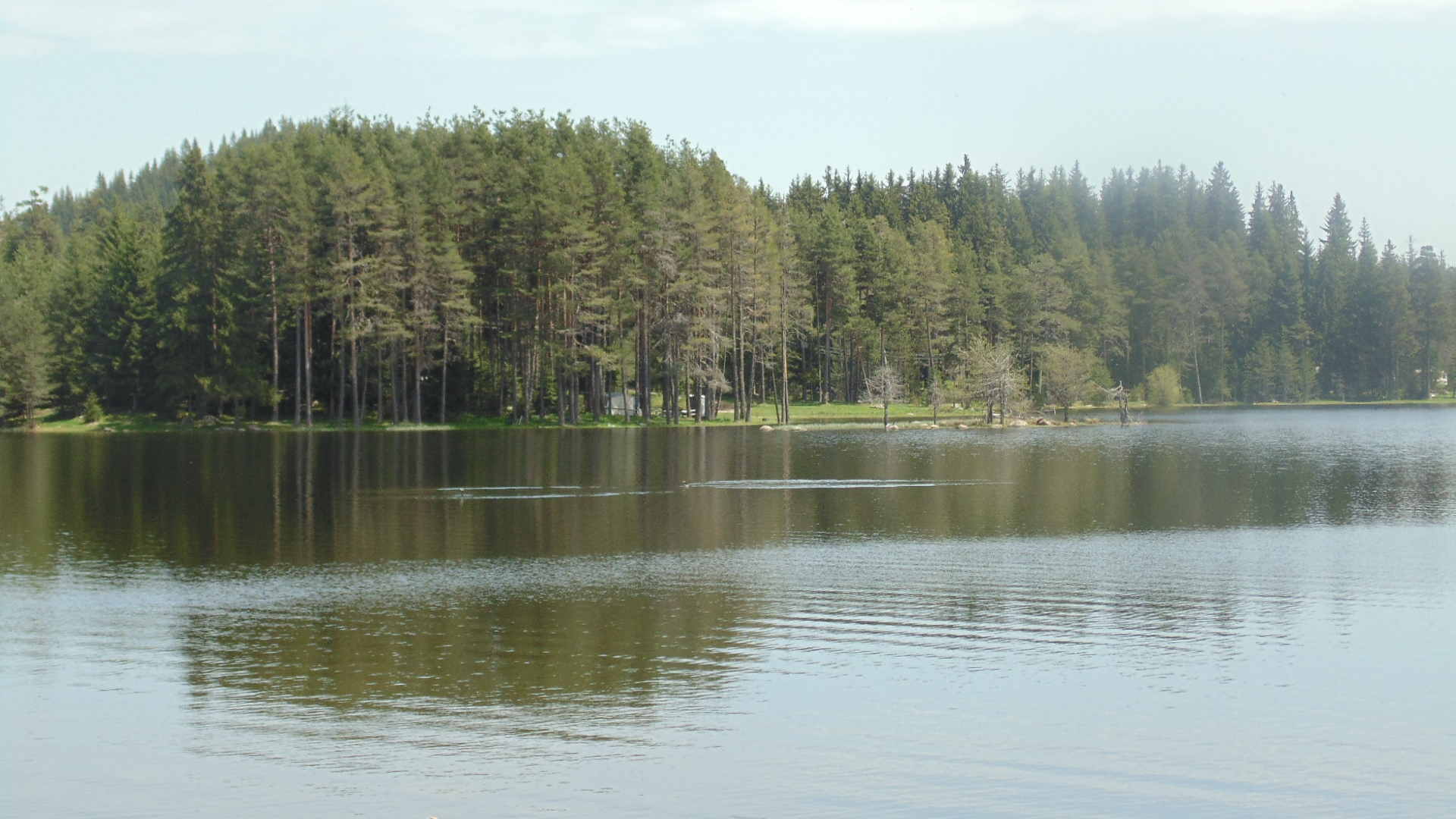

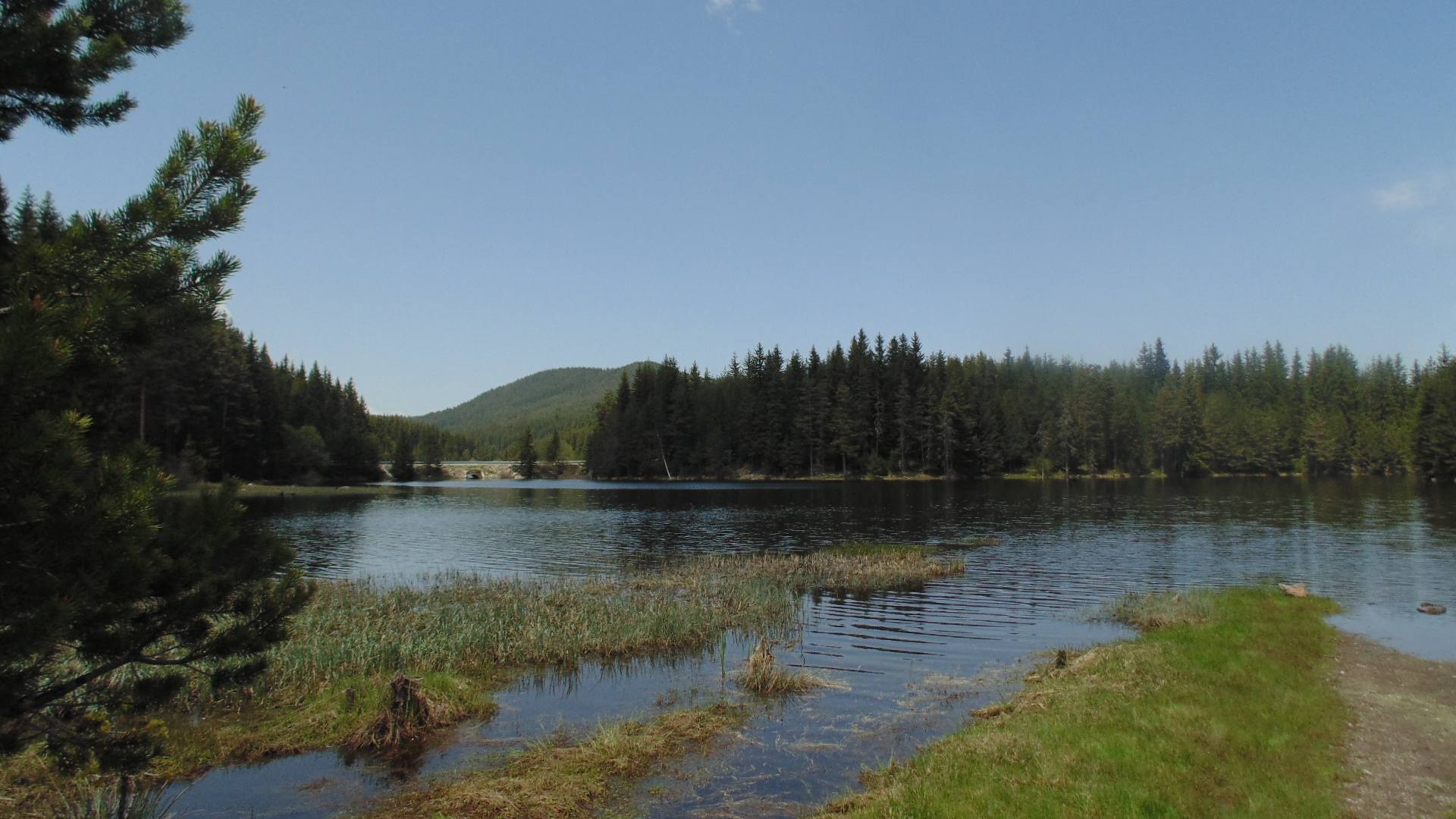

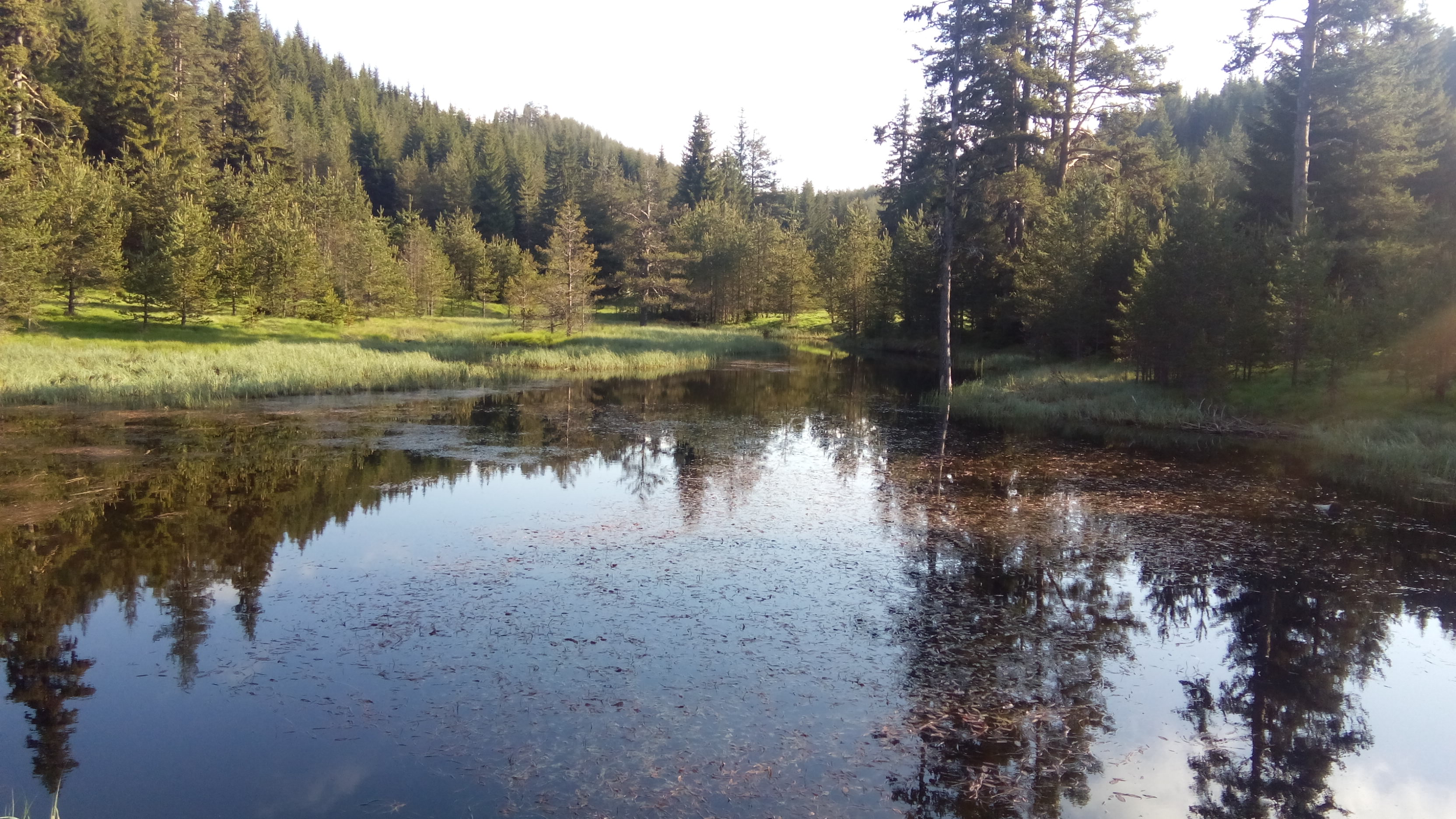
