= Batak Hydro Power Plant =

Hydroelectric power plant in Batak, Bulgaria

- Country: Bulgaria
- Location: Batak
- Coordinates: 41°55′21″N 24°10′10″E
- Status: Operational
- Commission date: 1 January 1958
- Owner: NEK EAD
- Operator: NEK EAD

Thermal power station
- Primary fuel: Hydropower

Power generation
- Units operational: 4 x 11,7 MW
- Make and model: Pelton wheel turbines
- Nameplate capacity: 46,8 MW

Batak Hydro Power Plant (Bulgarian: Водноелектрическа централа "Батак", romanized: Vodnoelektricheska tsentrala "Batak") is an active underground hydro power plant located in Batak, Bulgaria, which is a part of the Batak Hydropower Cascade.

== History ==
The idea for the construction of power plants along the Vacha River utilising the catchment area in the Western Rhodopes, dates back to 1920, when engineer Ivan Mavrov proposed it in his work "Archive of Water Power in Bulgaria". This idea was taken up by engineer Todor Romanov in the 1930s. The conceptual and technical design for the entire "Batak Hydropower Cascade" was developed between 1951 and 1955 in "Hydro Energy Project". The project was developed by Dimo Velev, Kiril Grigorov, Gichev and others. It included dams, equalising devices and three power plants - Batak HPP (underground), Peshtera HPP (underground) and Aleko HPP (above ground).

Batak HPP was commissioned in 1958 and was the first underground HPP in Bulgaria.

== Technology ==
The turbines are driven by water that comes from the Golyam Beglik dam via a pressure diversion. The dam has a circular cross-section with a diameter of 2.40 metres, a capacity of 13.6 m³/s, a length of 11.7 kilometres and a waterfall of 400 metres. The water from the Beglika and Toshkov Chark dams and the Gashna, Cherna and Byala dams flows into the diversion.

Four vertical turbo groups were installed at the Batak Power Plant. The turbines are a Pelton wheel system with two nozzles. The generators are designed for 10.5 kV. The electricity generated is exported to an above-ground 10 kV system via tunnels and bare conductor rails. The above-ground building houses the 10 and 20 kV indoor units, while the 110 kV outdoor unit, which is connected to the 110 kV power line, was built next to it. With an average annual utilisation of 2800 hours, the power plant produces an average of 109.6 GWh per year.

The power plant was completely refurbished between 2000 and 2001.

The waste water from the power plant is channelled via a 3 km long unpressurised sewer with a cross-section of 2.80 m x 2.80 m to the "Nova Mahala" collection tank, which then flows into the Batak Reservoir.
