= Devinska reka =

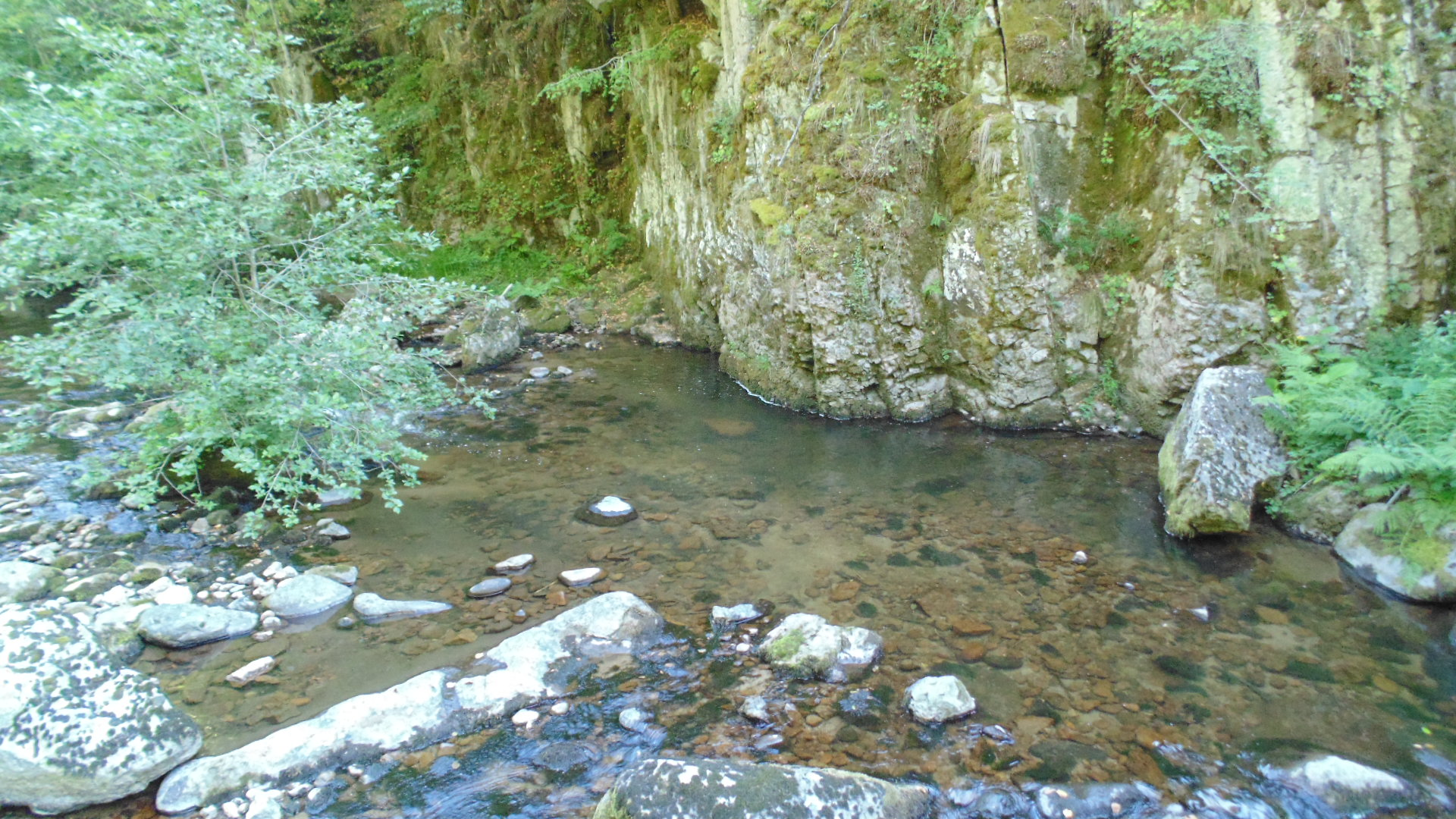

Location
- Country: Bulgaria

Physical characteristics
- Source
  - location: south of Golyama Syutkya, Rhodope Mountains
  - coordinates: 41°52′36.12″N 24°1′39″E
  - elevation: 2,000 m (6,600 ft)
- Mouth
  - location: Vacha
  - coordinates: 41°44′16.08″N 24°25′8.04″E
  - elevation: 685 m (2,247 ft)
- Length: 57 km (35 mi)
- Basin size: 427 km^{2} (165 sq mi)

Basin features
- Progression: Vacha→ Maritsa→ Aegean Sea

The Devinska reka (Bulgarian: Девинска река) is a river in the Rhodope Mountains, southern Bulgaria, a left tributary of the Vacha, itself a right tributary of the river Maritsa. This 57 km long river is the longest tributary of the Vacha and drains the highest parts of the ridges Batak Mountain and Veliyshko–Videnishki of the western Rhodopes.

== Geography ==
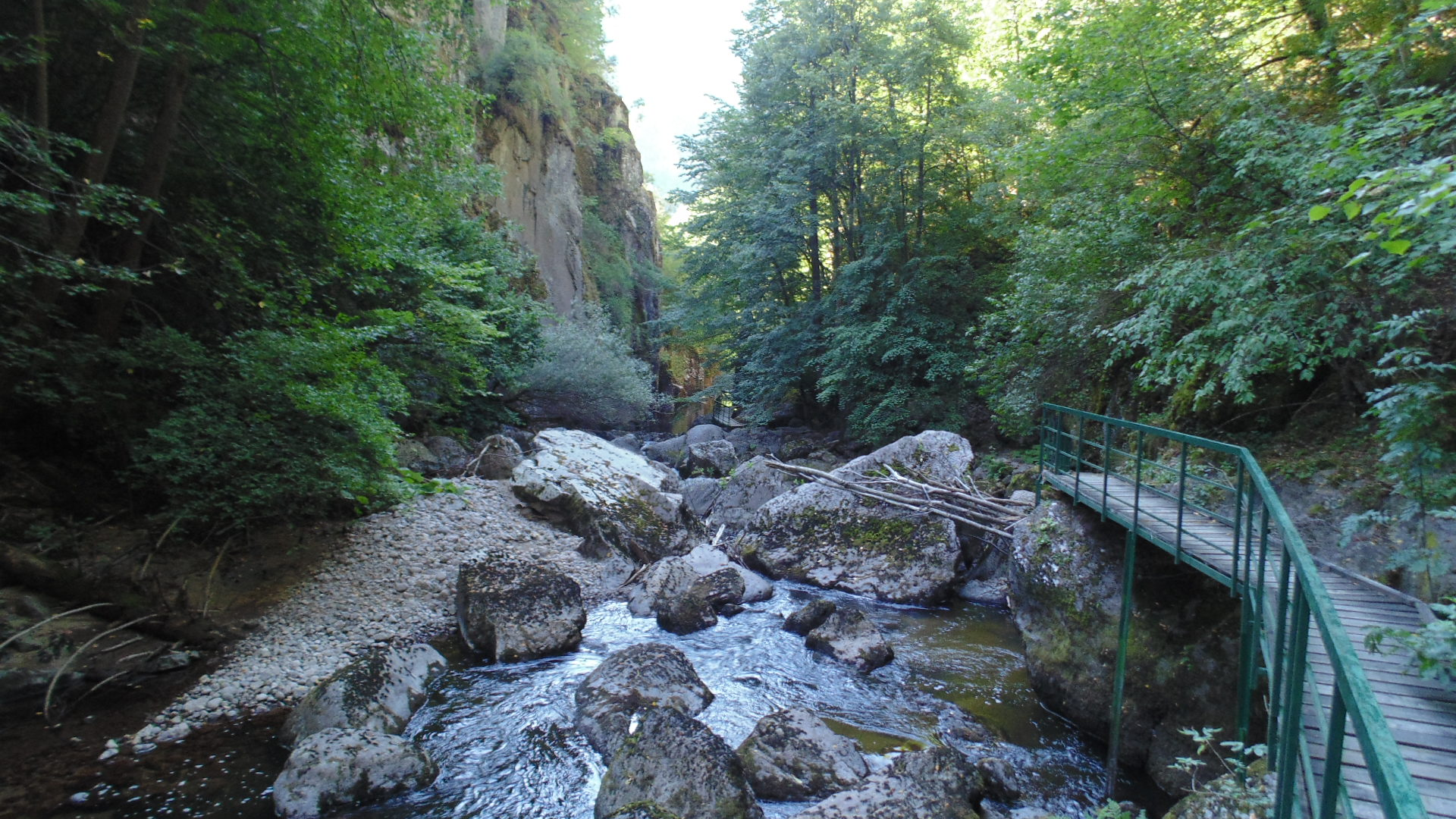
The Course of Devinska reka protected area

The river springs under the name Semiza at an altitude of 2,000 m, 2 km south of the summit of Golyama Syutkya (2,186 m) in the Batak Mountain of the western Rhodope Mountains. It flows in a deep forested valley along its while course, initially running south and then changing direction to the northeast, southeast and again south. Between the Beglika State Forestry and the Toshkov Chark Reservoir in its upper course, the river is also known as the Beglishka reka. Downstream of Toshkov Chark it flows east through the Devin Mountain, which it cuts through a deep gorge. The river exits the gorge upstream of the town of Devin, where its valley widens, and flows into the Vacha in the eastern neighbourhoods of Devin at an altitude of 685 m, just upstream of the Vacha Reservoir.

Its drainage basin covers a territory of 427 km^{2} or 26% of Vacha's total and borders the drainage basins of the Stara reka and small left tributaries of the Vacha to the north, the Chepinska reka to the west and northwest, the Mesta to the southwest, and small left tributaries of the Vacha to the south. The Devinska reka has numerous small tributaries.

The river has rain-snow feed with high water in April–May and low water in October. The average annual discharge at Devin is 5 m^{3}/s.

== Ecology ==
The river and its valley harbour rich wildlife. The protected area The Course of Devinska reka was established in 2002 along the river in Borino and Devin municipalities and covers an territory of 1.40 km^{2}. It was created to conserve rare flora and fauna, and the pristine riparian forests of common alder (Alnus glutinosa) and European ash (Fraxinus excelsior). The predominant fish species are river trout, round-scaled barbel and common minnow. The zone protects important populations of brown bear, chamois, red deer and Eurasian otter, as wells as the beetle Lucanus cervus. There are a number of Balkan or Rhodopean endemic plant species, such as Haberlea rhodopensis, Seseli rhodopeum, Sedum kostovi, Campanula lanata and Lathrea rhodopea, as well as other rare species, including Genista lydia and Galanthus nivalis. The ecologic trail Struilitsa–Kaleto–Lakata is constructed along the meanders of the Devnenska reka. A small path branches off from the main ecological trail and leads to the Samodivsko Praskalo waterfall, among the tallest in the Rhodope Mountains, with two falls of 25 m and 45 m respectively.

== Settlements and economy ==
The river flows in Pazardzhik and Smolyan Provinces. There is a single settlement along its course, the spa town of Devin, situated at the confluence with the Vacha. The waters of Devinska reka are used for electricity generation. There are two small reservoirs along its upper course, Beglika and Toshkov Chark, as well as two major reservoirs along its upper tributaries, Golyam Beglik and Shiroka Polyana, which divert part of its waters to the Batak Hydropower Cascade (254 MW), constructed mainly along the neighbouring Stara reka drainage basin to the northwest. The water flowing into the Vacha is utilized in the Dospat–Vacha Hydropower Cascade (500.2 MW).

== Gallery ==
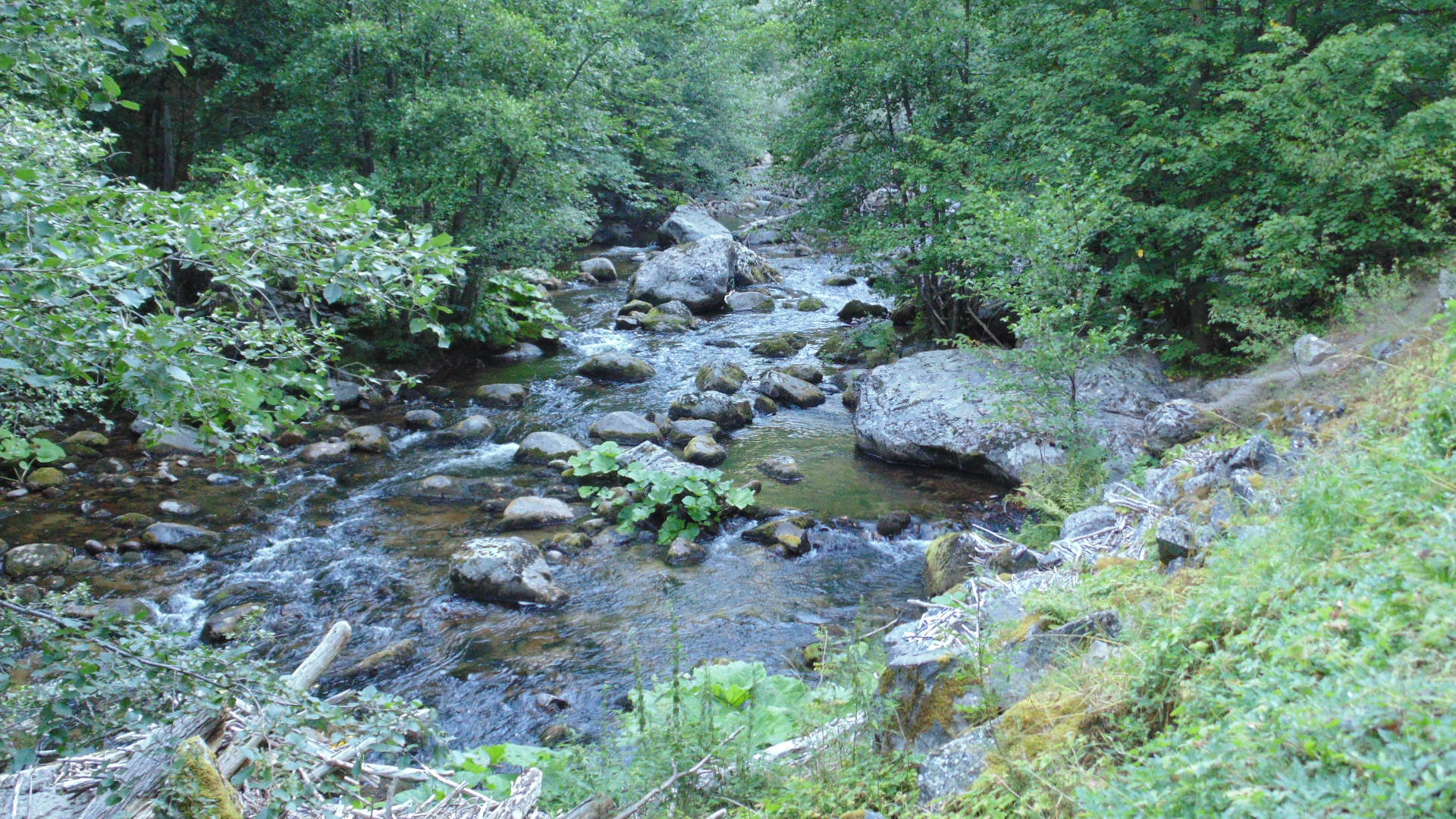

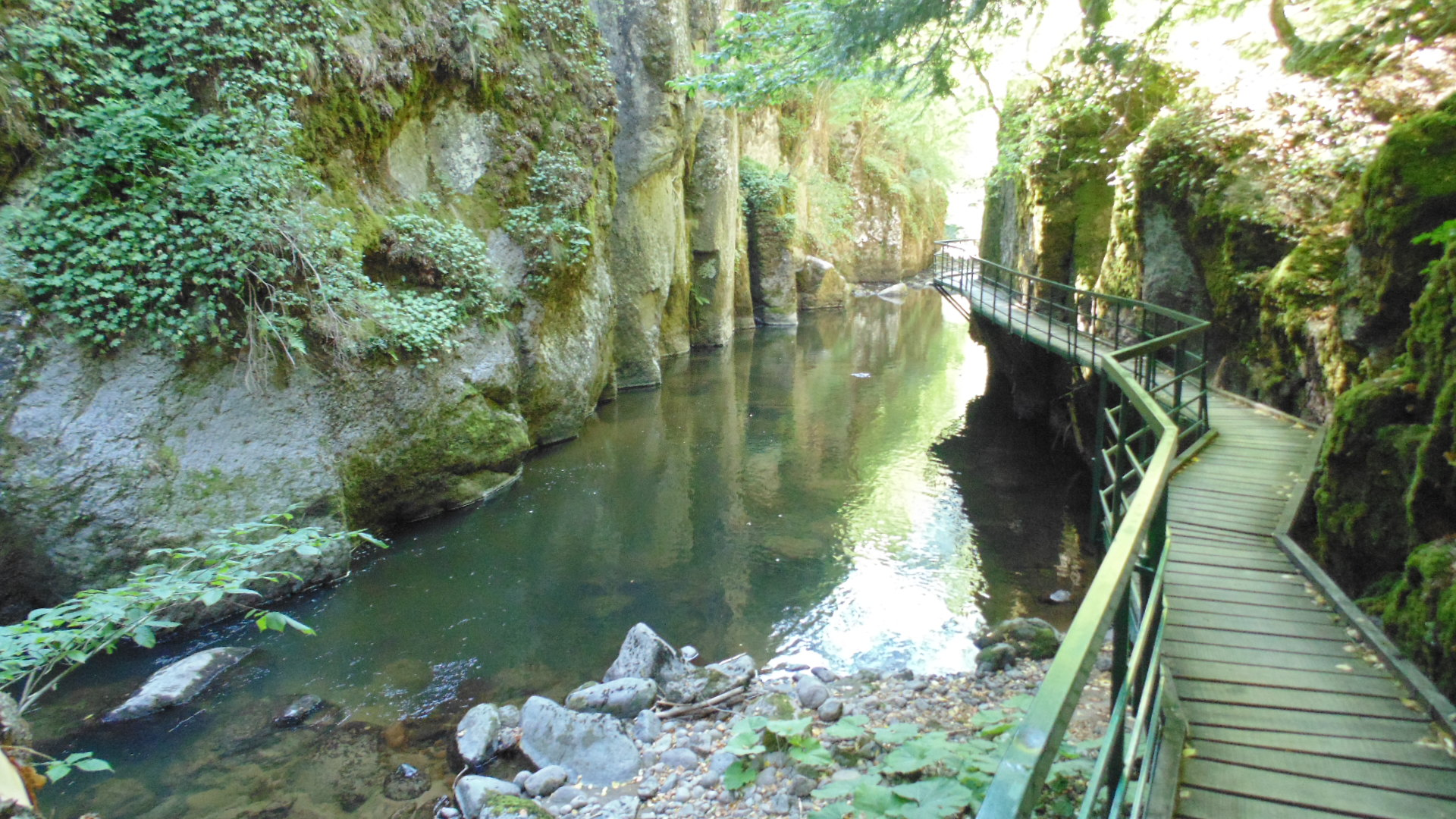

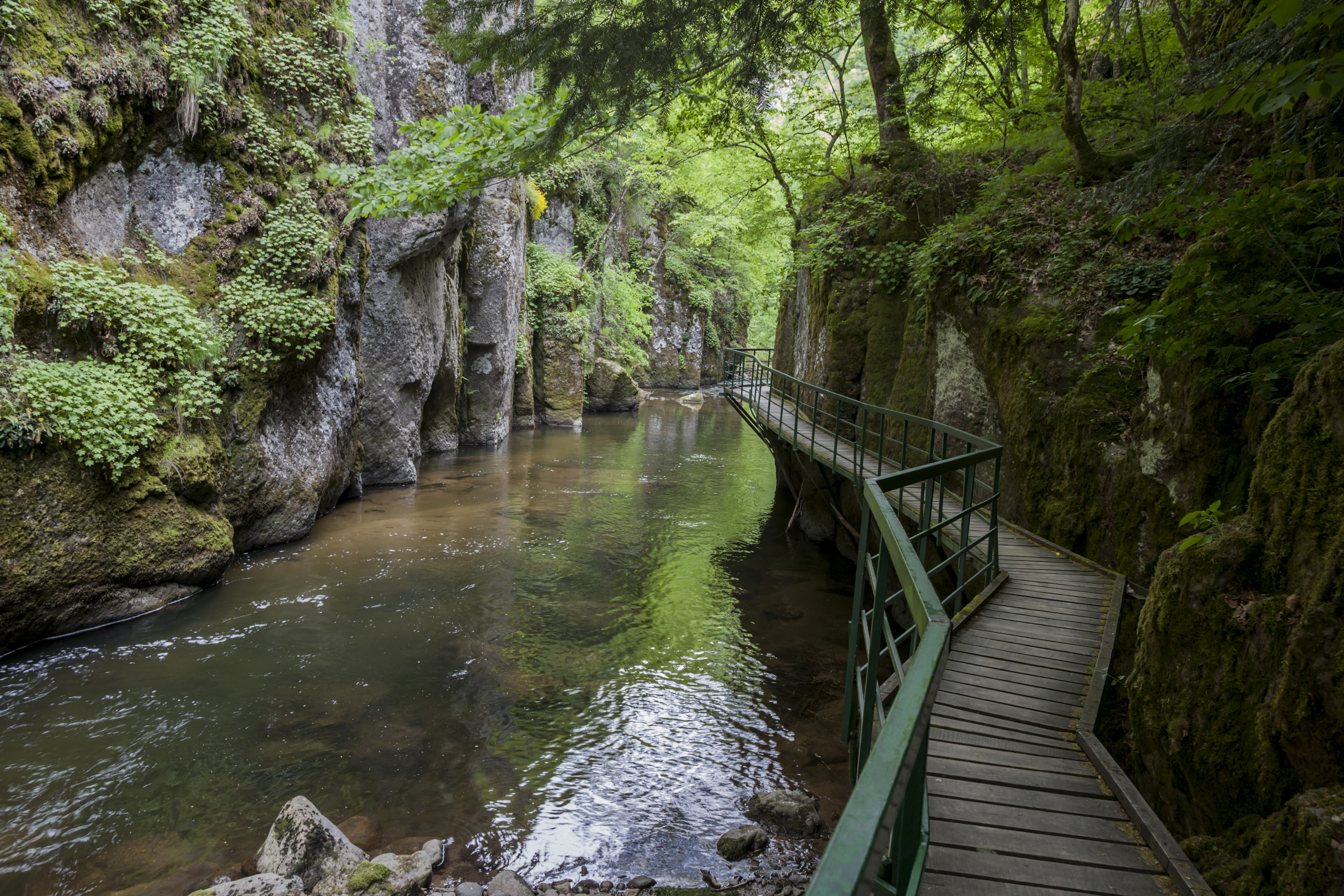

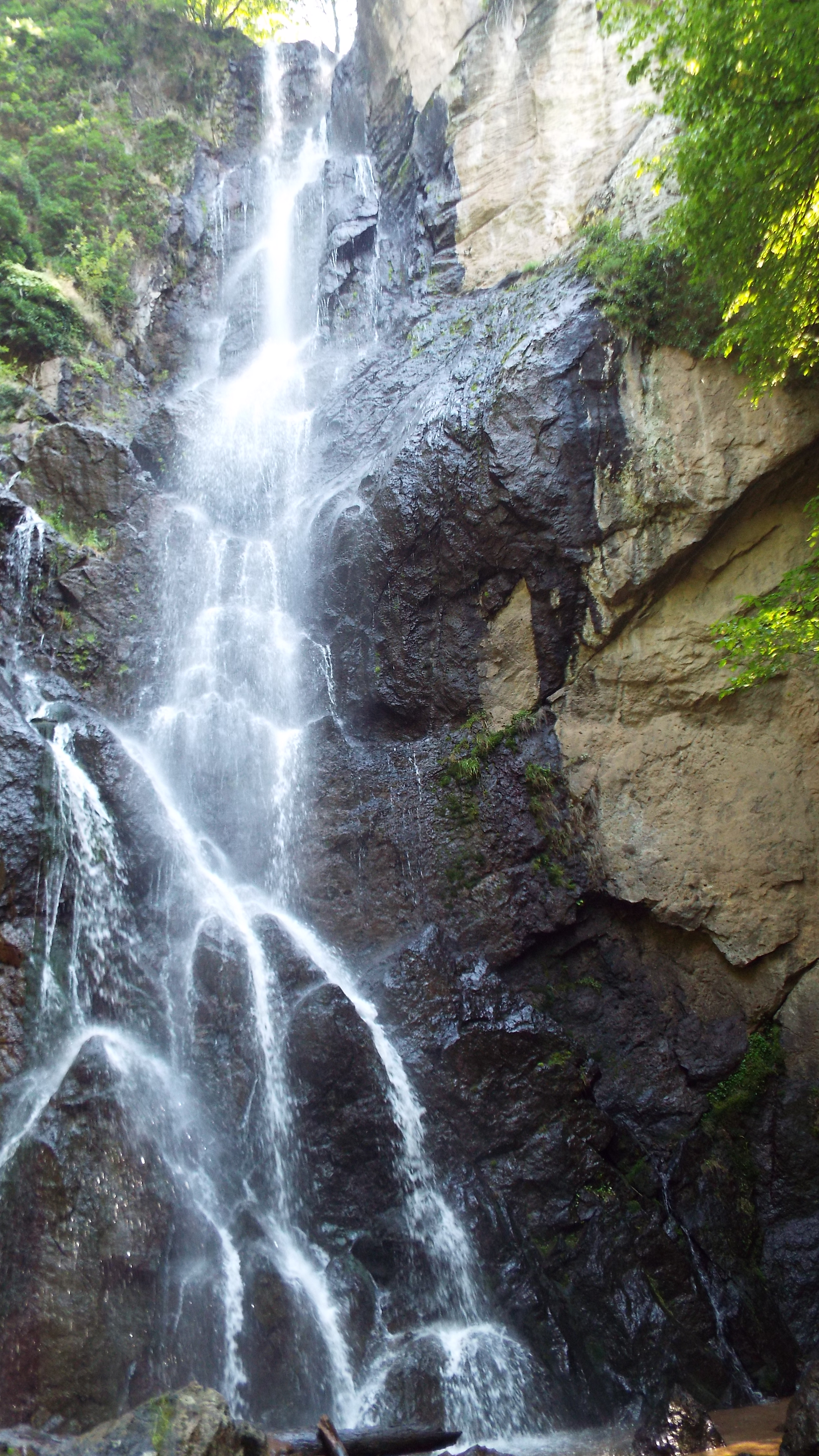
