= Beglika =

Reservoir in Pazardzhik Province, Bulgaria

Beglika Dam
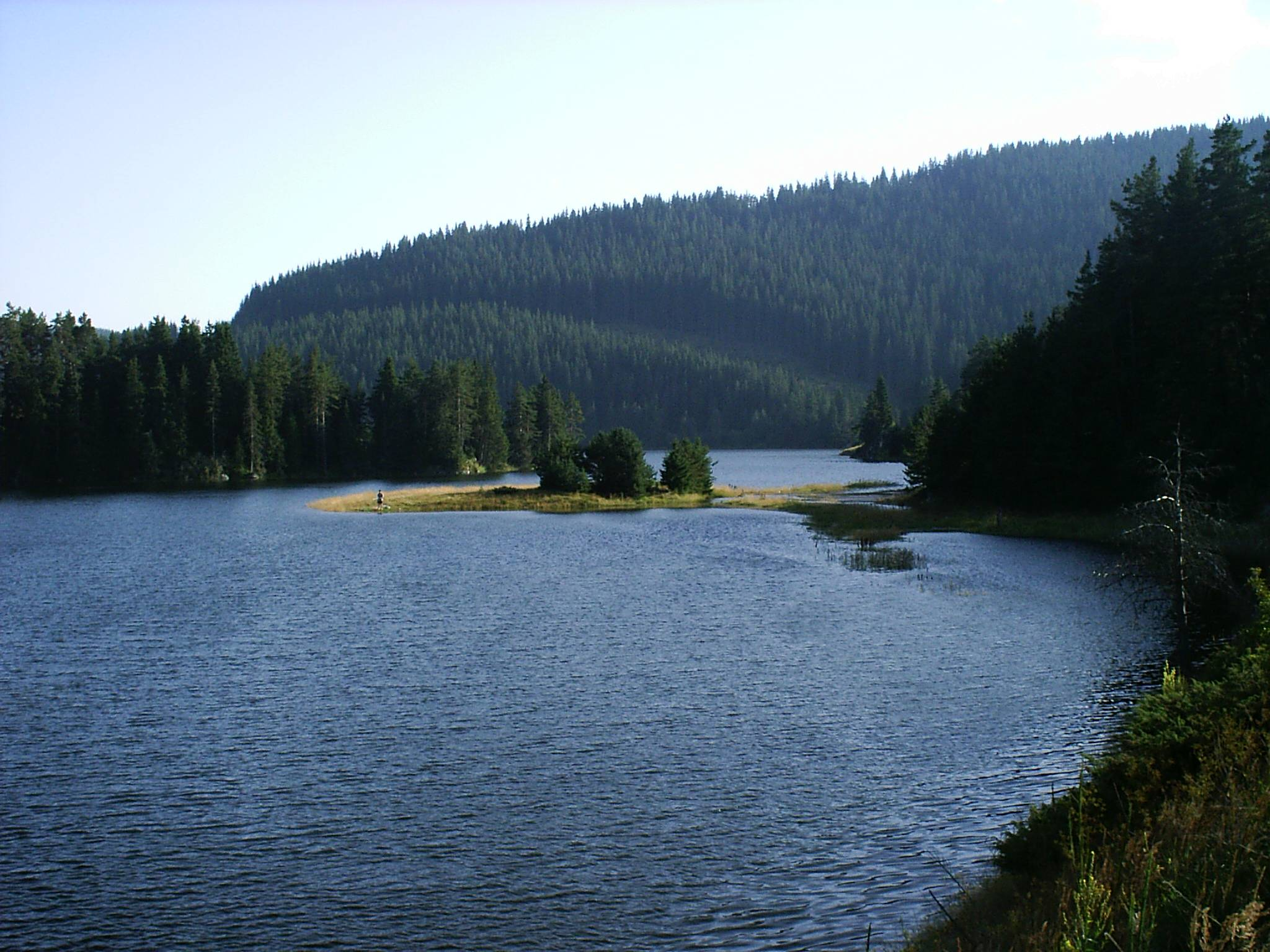

- Location of Beglika in Bulgaria
- Interactive map of Beglika Dam
- Official name: Язовир Беглика (Bulgarian)
- Location: Rhodope Mountains south of Batak
- Coordinates: 41°49′26.39″N 24°7′44.02″E
- Construction began: 1954
- Opening date: 1956

Dam and spillways
- Type of dam: concrete gravity dam
- Height: 18.3 m (60 ft)
- Length: 73.5 m (241 ft)

Reservoir
- Creates: Beglika Reservoir
- Total capacity: 1,600,000 m^{3} (1,300 acre⋅ft)
- Catchment area: 24.74 km^{2} (9.55 mi^{2})
- Surface area: 0.3 km^{2} (74 acres)

Beglika (Bulgarian: Беглика) is a small reservoir in the Western Rhodope Mountains of southern Bulgaria. Its lies in Batak Municipality in the southern part of Pazardzhik Province and forms part of the Batak Hydropower Cascade (254 MW).

Beglika is situated immediately under the dam of the Golyam Beglik Reservoir and serves as a seasonal equalizer of waters from the catchment of the Beglishka reka, a tributary of the Devinska reka in the Vacha drainage. Constructed in 1954–1956, it has a 18.3 m high concrete gravity dam with a length of 73.5 m. The dam forms a lake with an area of 0.3 km^{2} and a volume of 1.6 million m^{3}.

It has a spillway with two openings of 9 m each and a maximum spillway capacity of 120 m^{3}/s. The main outlet is a pipe with a diameter of 600 mm and a capacity of 3.0 m^{3}/s. Beglika has a pumping station, through which its waters are pumped into the main pressure derivation of the Batak Hydro Power Plant or are diverted upstream to Golyam Beglik.

The reservoir is located 2 km southeast of the Beglika Reserve, established in 1960 to protect old-growth forests of Norway spruce (Picea abies), which contains the only populations of Dasiphora fruticosa and Astragalus alopecurus in the Balkans.

== Gallery ==
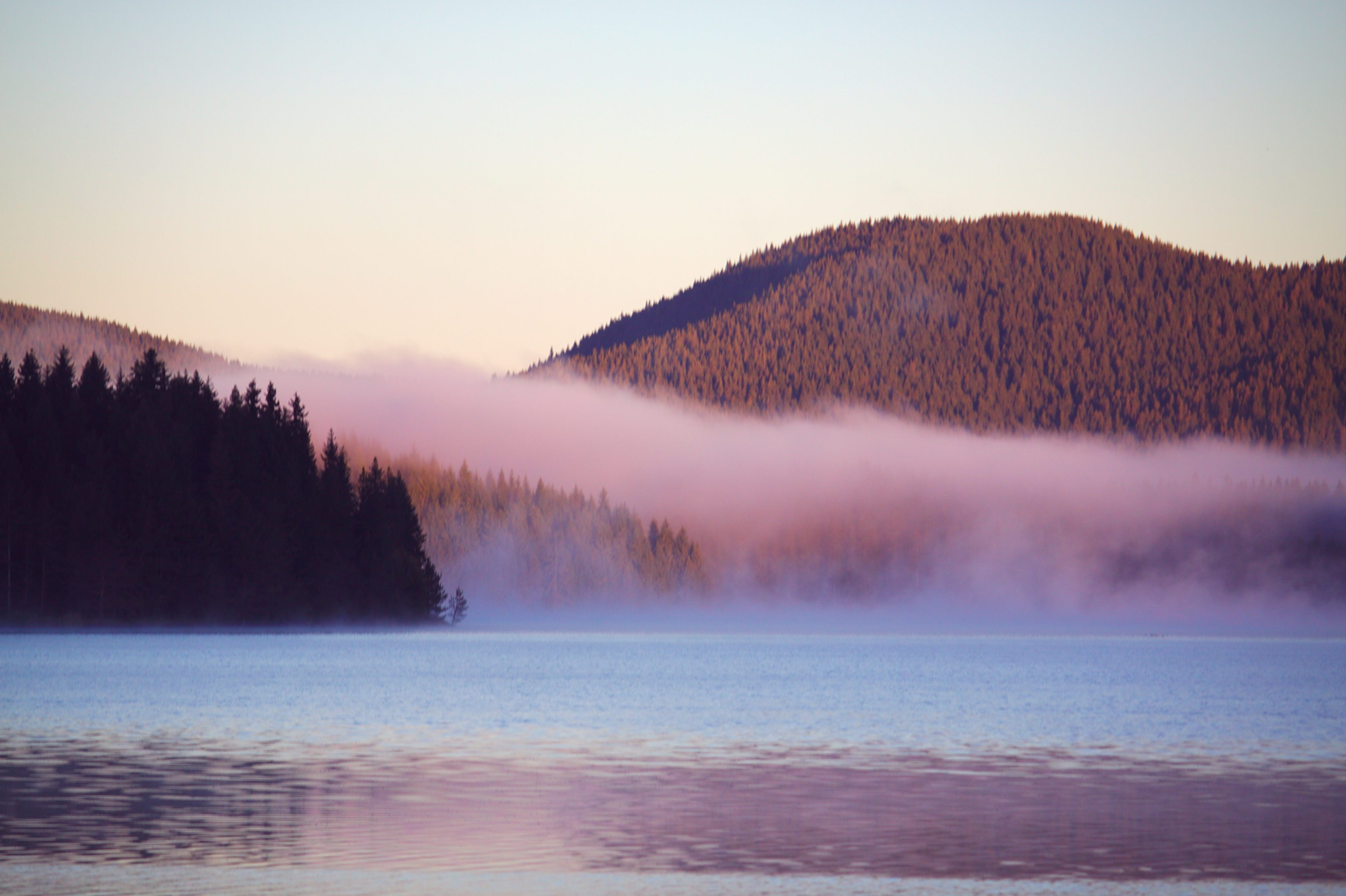

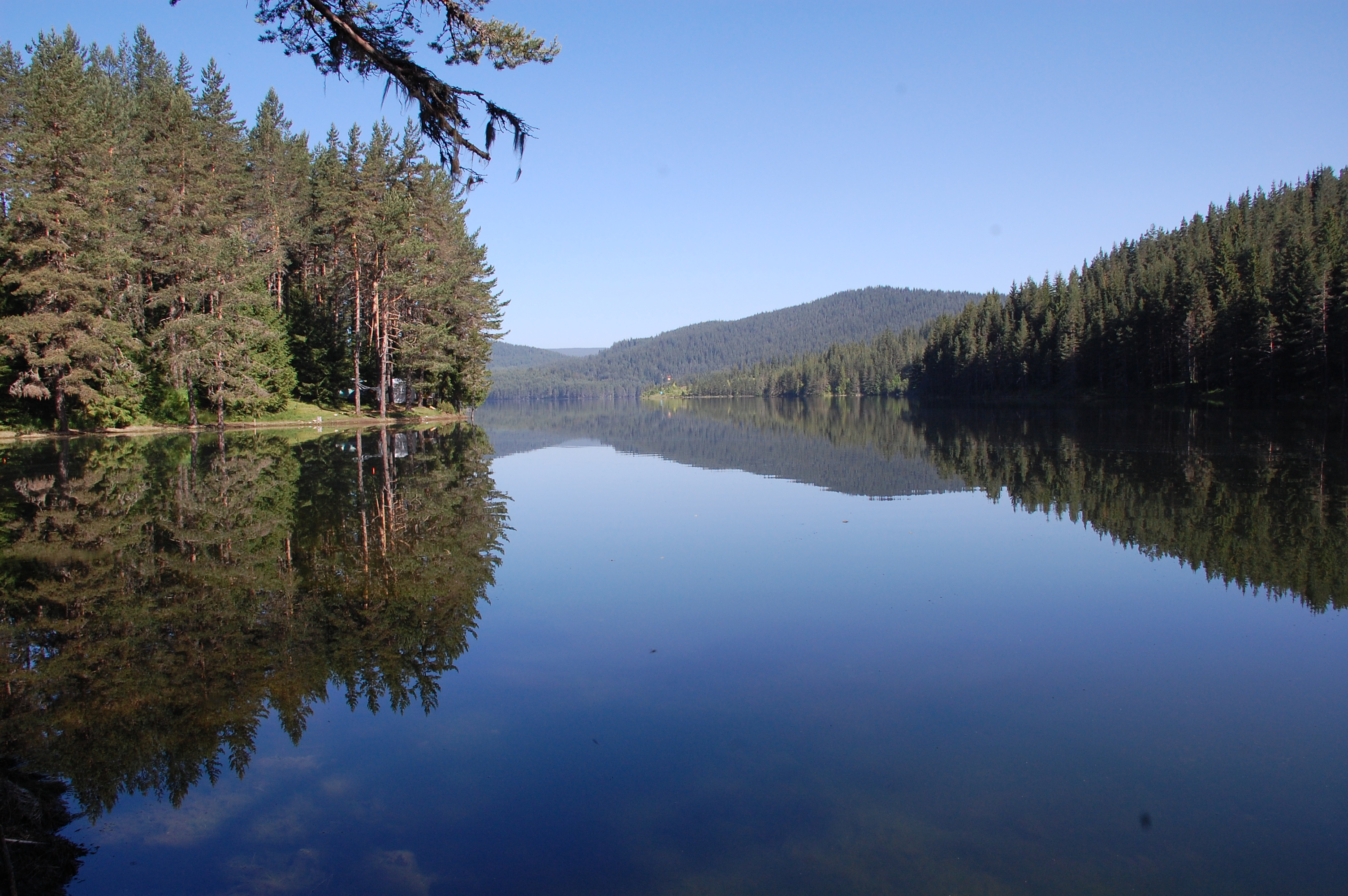

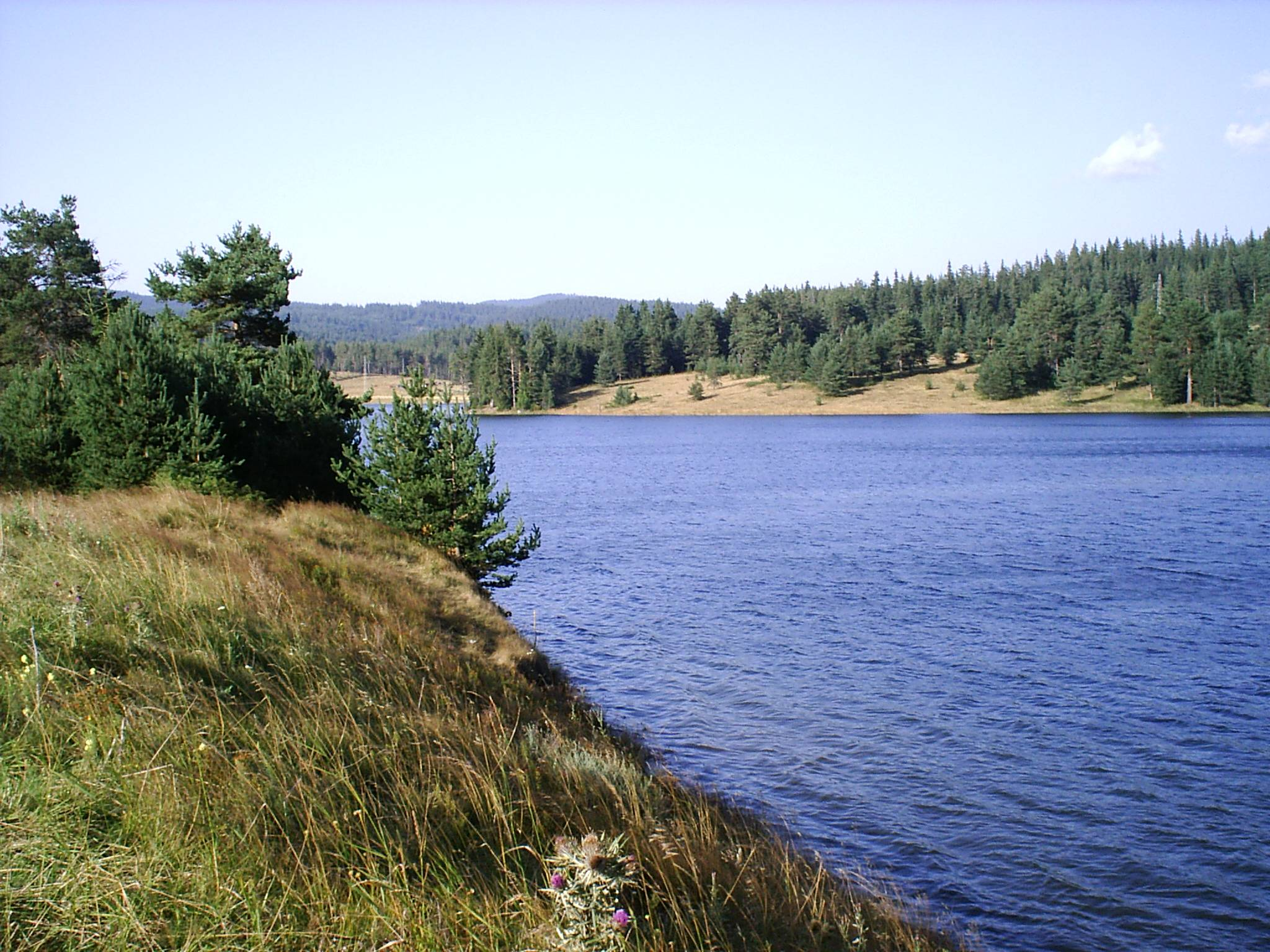
