= Ballycamus =

Townland in County Tipperary, Ireland

Coordinates: 52.59663°N 7.916854°W

Ballycamus or Ballycamusk (Irish: Béal Átha Cumaisc) is a townland in County Tipperary, Ireland. The River Suir forms its eastern boundary.

== Angling ==
The waters of the River Suir in the area, are run by Thurles, Holycross and Ballycamus anglers, and river trout can be caught here.
