= Batak Hydropower Cascade =

- Locations of the Batak Hydropower Cascade power plants in Bulgaria
- Interactive map of Batak Hydropower Cascade
- Country: Bulgaria
- Location: Pazardzhik Province
- Purpose: Hydroelectricity; Irrigation
- Status: Operational
- Construction began: 1946
- Owner: National Electricity Company
- Batak HPP
- Interactive map of Batak HPP
- Location: Batak
- Status: Operational
- Opening date: 1958

Power Station
- Installed capacity: 46.8 MW
- Annual generation: 112 GWh
- Peshtera HPP
- Interactive map of Peshtera HPP
- Location: Peshtera
- Status: Operational
- Opening date: 1959

Power Station
- Installed capacity: 136 MW
- Annual generation: 300 GWh
- Aleko HPP
- Interactive map of Aleko HPP
- Location: Aleko Konstantinovo
- Status: Operational
- Opening date: 1959

Power Station
- Installed capacity: 71.4 MW
- Annual generation: 147 GWh

The Batak Hydroelectric Cascade (Bulgarian: Баташки водносилов път, translit. Batashki Vodnosilov Pat) is situated in the Pazardzhik Province, southern Bulgaria and is among the first hydroelectric cascades in the country. Inaugurated on 6 September 1959, it includes seven reservoirs and three underground hydro power plants — Batak, Peshtera and Aleko with a combined installed capacity of 254.2 MW, producing an average of 796 GWh annually.

Located in the Rhodope Mountains, the complex receives waters from the drainage basins of the Chepinska reka, Stara reka and Vacha, right tributaries of the Maritsa, as well as the Dospat, a left tributary of the Mesta. Its catchment area is 761 km^{2} spanning from an altitude of 2,186 m at the summit of Golyama Syutkya to 452 m at the town of Peshtera.

== Structure ==
=== First level ===
The first level of the cascade includes the facilities located above 1,520 m altitude, grouped in two hydro junctions, Shiroka Polyana and Golyam Beglik.

==== Shiroka Polyana junction ====
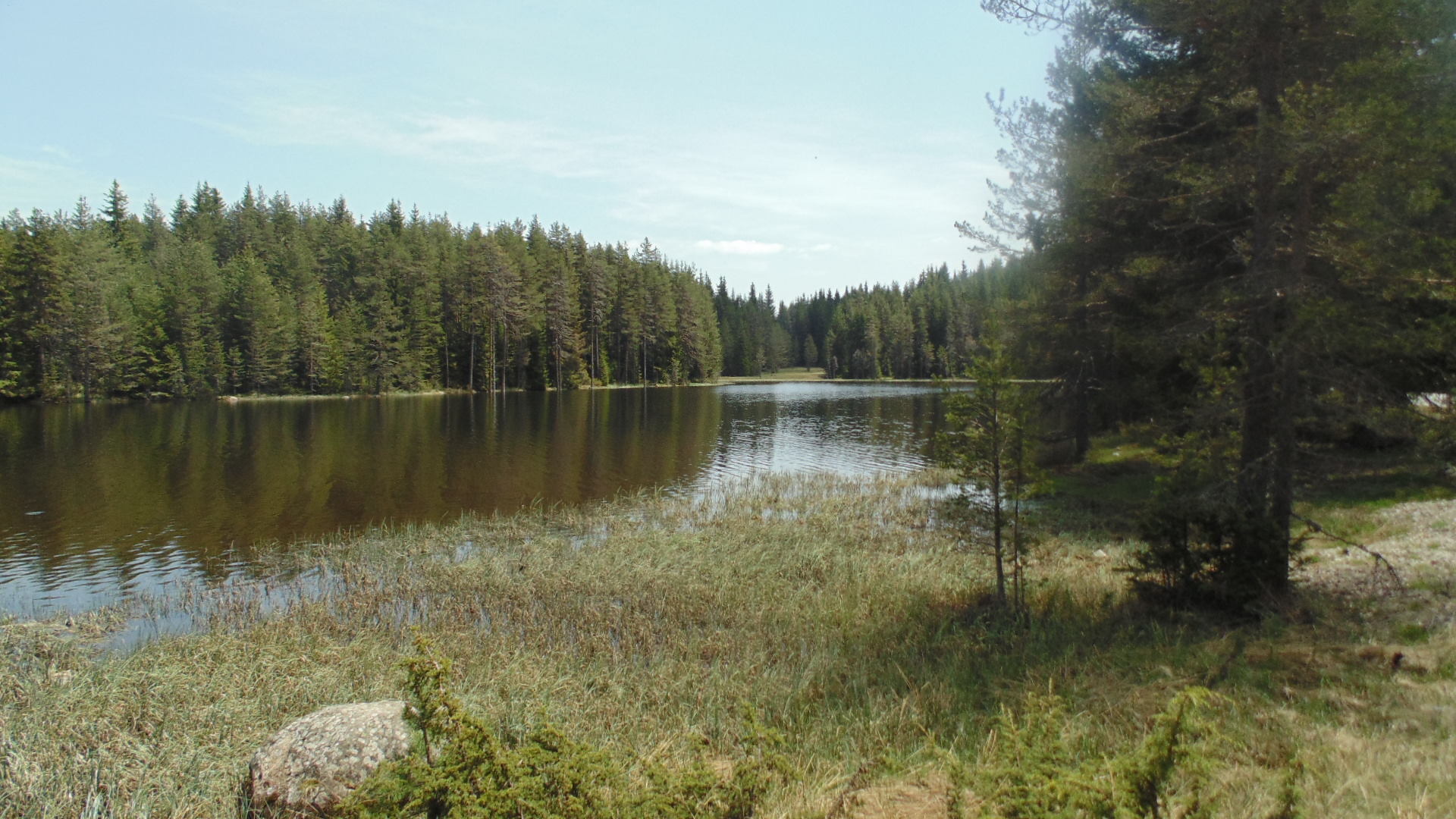
Shiroka Polyana Reservoir

Shiroka Polyana junction is a system of dams and pumping stations, aimed at collecting water from the upper course of the catchment areas of the rivers Dospat and Vacha, including the latter's tributary, the Gashnya. It was initially planned to supply water to the Dospat–Vacha Hydroelectric Cascade further east but it was decided that it would be more efficient to transfer water to the Batak Hydroelectric Cascade. The hydroelectric junction was built in 1959–1962, after the cascade was inaugurated.

The junction collects water from a system of catchments and derivations, some of which pass through three small equalizer dams — Dzhenevra, a daily equalizer with a pumping station, transferring water to the Shiroka Polyana Reservoir; it has a volume of 90 thousand m^{3} and a dam of mixed construction (concrete spillway and stone masonry) with a height of 6.4 m and a length of 73.5 m; Karadza Dere, a weekly equalizer with a pumping station transferring water to the Blatoto Equalizer; it has a volume of 121 thousand m^{3} and a stone embankment dam with a clay core with a height of 17.8 m and a length of 71 m; and Blatoto, weekly equalizer transferring water to the Shiroka Polyana Reservoir; it has a volume of 122 thousand m^{3} and a stone embankment dam with a height of 9.2 m and a length of 50 m.

The main reservoir of the junction, Shiroka Polyana, occupies a former grassland meadow and was formed by the construction of five separate dams at its shores — a concrete gravity dam of the Kireeva River with a height of 21.2 m and a length of 80 m, an earthen dam with a height of 15.7 m and a length of 186 m, an earthen-brick dam with a height of 3.8 m and a length of 57 m, an earthen-brick dam with a height of 2.7 m and a length of 38 m and an earthen dam with a height of 3.55 m and a length of 137 m.

The reservoir covers a surface area of 4.3 km^{2}, with a volume of 24 million m^{3} and an average depth of 6 m. It is linked to the neighbouring Golyam Beglik Reservoir through a tunnel, through which its waters are transferred to the Batak Hydropower Cascade.

==== Golyam Beglik junction ====
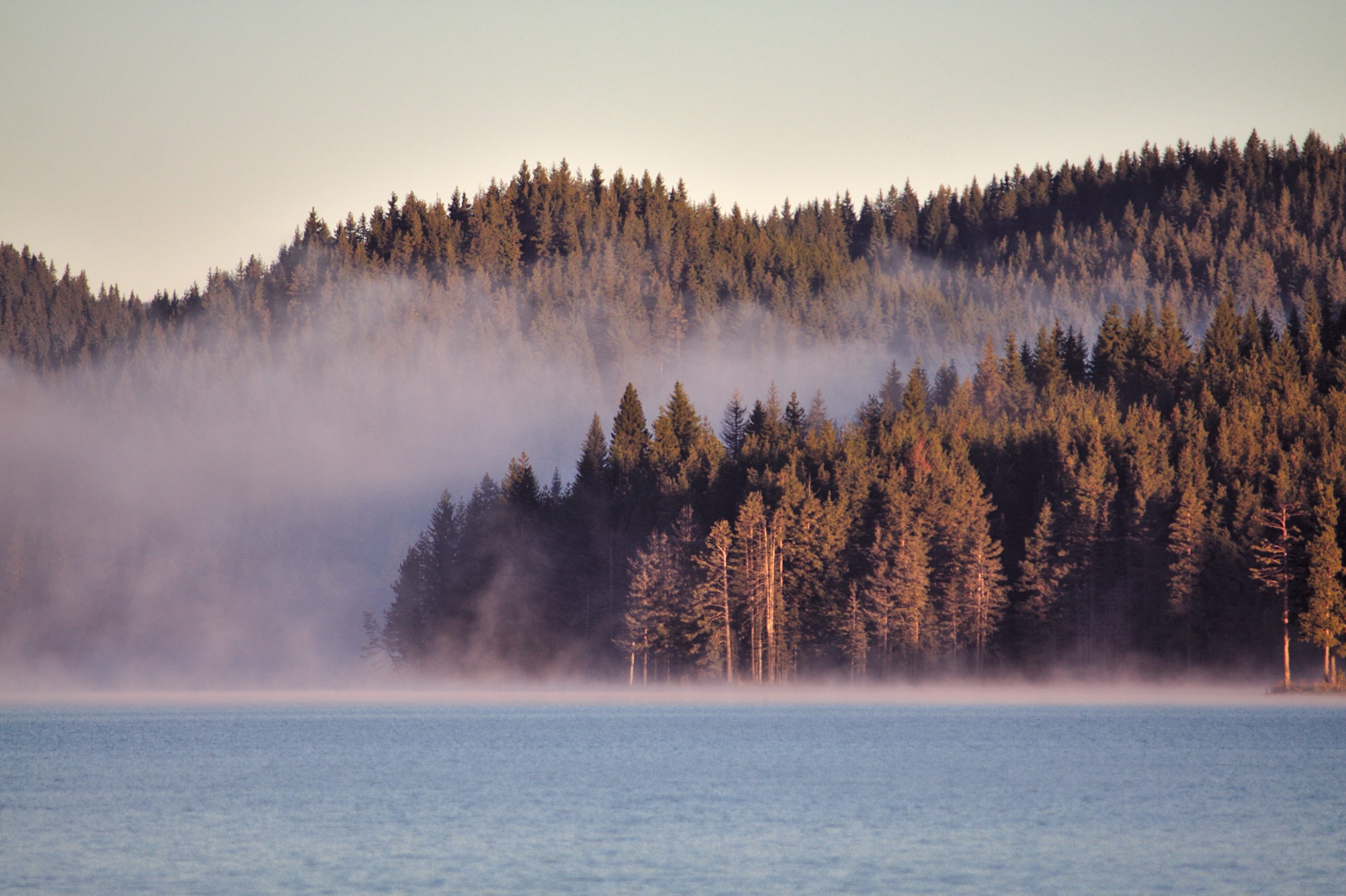
Golyam Beglik Reservoir

The main facility of the Golyam Beglik junction and the first level of the cascade is the eponymous reservoir, constructed in 1946–1951 along the course of the Kriva reka, a tributary of the Devinska reka of the Vacha drainage. It has a stone dam with a height of 46.50 m and a length of 190 m, located at an altitude of 1528.5 m. The reservoir serves as an annual leveler of the cascade and has a total volume of 62.1 million m^{3}. It receives waters from the Beglishka reka and its tributaries collection via a 7.9 km culvert with a capacity of 3.9 m^{3}/s. At its left bank begins the main pressure culvert to the Batak HPP, with a length of 11.7 km, diameter of 2.4 m and a capacity of 13.6 m^{3}/s.

Downstream of Golyam Beglik are situated the smaller reservoirs of Beglika and Toshkov Chark, constructed in 1954–1956. Beglika is located immediately below the dam Golyam Beglik and serves as a seasonal equalizer of waters from the catchment of the Beglishka reka. It has a concrete gravity dam with a height of 18.3 m and a length of 73.5 m; its volume is 1.6 million m^{3}. Toshkov Chark is located on the Devinska reka and serves for annual equalization of the water from its watershed. It has a stone dam with a steel screen with a height of 21.6 m and a length of 82.2 m; its volume is 1.8 million m^{3}. Beglika and Toshkov Chark are equipped with pumping stations to pump water into the main pressure culvert of the Batak HPP.

At the lower end of the Golyam Beglik junction is the Batak Hydro Power Plant, which was completed in 1958 and was the first underground power plant in Bulgaria. It powered by water falling from a height of 421 m with a discharge of 13.6 m^{3}/s. Its engine room has four Pelton turbines on vertical axes with a total installed power of 46.8 MW.

=== Second level ===
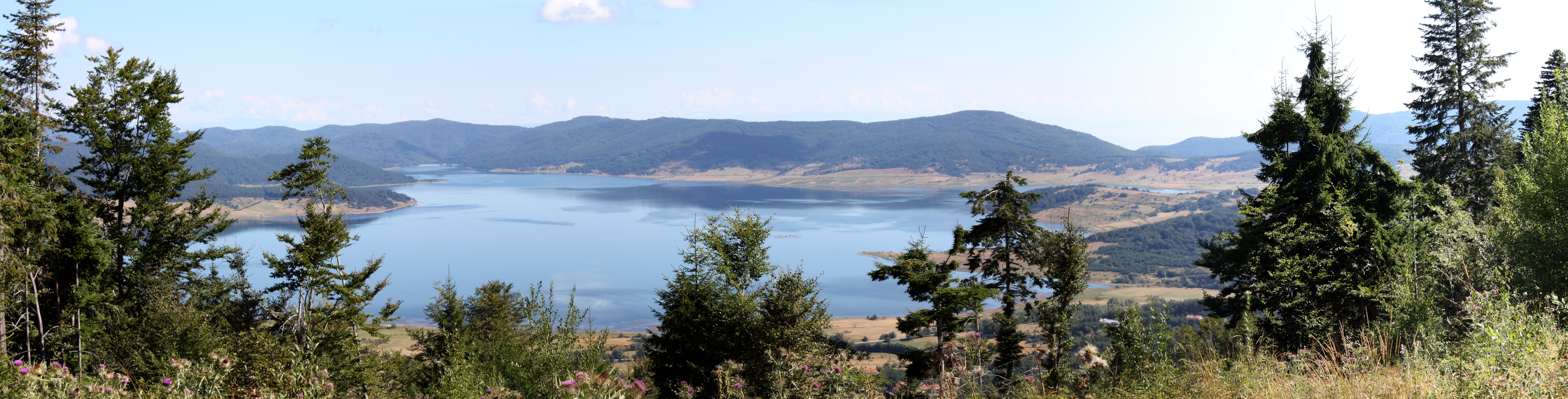
Batak Reservoir

The second level begins under the Batak HPP, with the water utilized by the plant being transferred through a 3 km long non-pressurized culvert with a diameter of 2.8 m to the collection derivation Nova Mahala, which also collects water from the tributaries of the Stara reka south of the town of Batak, and then flows into the Batak Reservoir. The reservoir also collects water from the tributaries of the Chepinska reka south of the town of Velingrad, the mid-course tributaries of the Stara reka south of Peshtera and Bratsigovo, several small tributaries of the Vacha, as well as the rivers Cherna and Byala.

The Batak Reservoir is the main leveling reservoir of the entire cascade, and one of the largest in Bulgaria. It was constructed in 1954–1959 and has two dam walls. The main one is an earth embankment with a height of 35 m and a length of 273 m, near which there is a trench spillway with a capacity of 14 m^{3}/s on the left bank and a main outlet via a tunnel with a capacity of 90 m^{3}/s on the right bank. The reservoir covers a surface area of 21.4 km^{2} and has a volume of 310 million m^{3}. Part of the water of the reservoir flows through a 3 km long pressure culvert to the Peshtera Hydro Power Plant.

The Peshtera HPP has been in inaugurated 1959. It is an underground power station with 5 units of horizontal synchronized generators, each driven by two Pelton turbines. The original installed capacity of the plant was 128 MW and during a reconstruction in the late 1990s, it was increased to 136 MW. The planned annual production of the plant is 444 GWh, and the actual one for the period 1963–2009 was 280 GWh and 300 GWh as of 2023.

=== Third level ===
The third level includes the water intake of Stara reka, together with the derivations and equalizers of the underground Aleko Hydro Power Plant, located near the village of Aleko Konstantinovo on the northern slopes of the Rhodope Mountains and put into operation in 1959. The water from the intake and the upper levels of the cascade is fed through the main 9.9 km long non-pressurized culvert with a diameter of 3.6 m to an equalizer dam above the Aleko HPP, which has a reinforced concrete dam and a volume of 170 thousand m^{3}.

Water with a discharge of 30 m^{3}/s is then led to a fall of 272 m via a pressurized pipeline to power three vertical Francis turbines. Electricity generation is carried out by synchronous generators with a voltage of 10.5 kV with a total installed capacity of 71.4 MW. The utilized water enters the lower equalizer dam with a volume of 280 thousand m^{3} and is channeled the Upper Thracian Plain, where it is used for the irrigation of up to 400 km^{2} of agricultural land.

== History ==
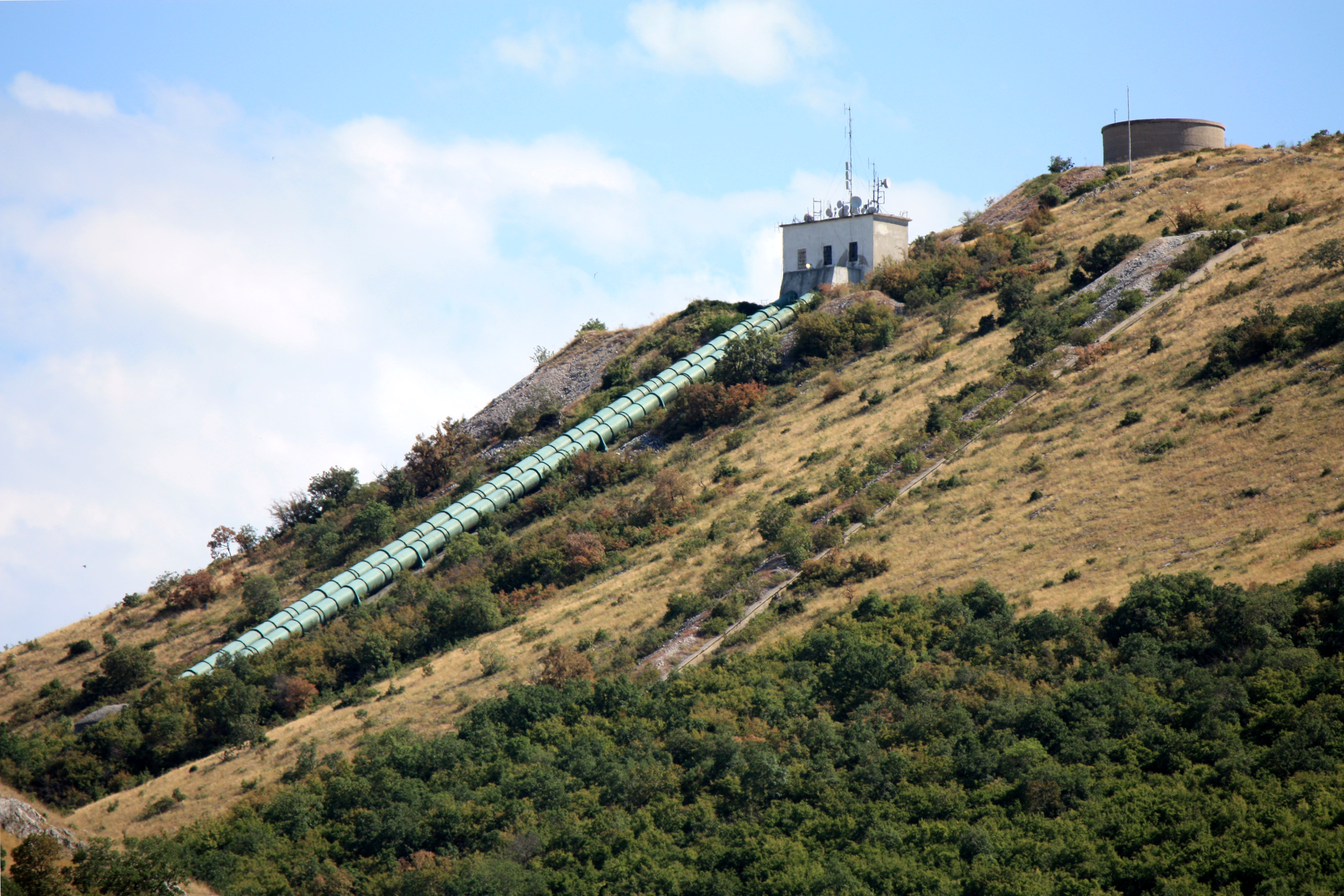
Aleko HPP

The concept of utilizing the waters in the area of what is now the Batak Hydropower Cascade was first conceived in 1920, when in his publication “The Water Powers of Bulgaria and their Use” engineer Ivan Mavrov proposed the construction of a dam at the present-day Batak Reservoir. The Vacha Water Union lobbied for the construction of the reservoir to transfer additional water to their power plant on the Vacha river in the summer, but the project was not realized. In the 1930s, this idea was launched by engineer Todor Romanov.

Studies for the construction of the Batak Reservoir began in 1945 and as a result, the position of the dam was changed compared to Ivan Mavrov's original idea. Construction commenced in the fall of 1946.

In 1947, on initiative of the chief director of the General Directorate for Electrification of Bulgaria engineer Marin Kalburov, a competition was held for the complete utilization of the waters of the rivers Chaya, Vacha, Stara reka, Chepelarska reka, Kriva reka and Maritsa. Based on the competition materials, the design comcept of three main cascades was formed, all of them eventually realized — Dospat–Vacha, Batak and Belmeken–Sestrimo.

The concept and technical project for the entire Batak Hydropower Cascade was developed by professor Dimo Velev, engineer Kiril Grigorov, engineer Gichev and others of “Energohydroproject” in the period 1951–1955. The main designers of the hydro power plants of the cascade are engineer Dimitar Dobrev (Peshtera HPP), electrical engineer Angel Chuchulev and engineer Petar Petrov (Batak HPP) and engineer Alexander Aleksiev (Aleko HPP).

The construction of the cascade is carried out by a company created for the purpose under “Hydrostroy” with director engineer Angel Petarchev and head engineer Ivan Maslenkov. The main part of the cascade was developed along the Stara reka. The catchment area includes river runoff, rainwater and snowmelt. Collection canals of great length were constructed to ensure the necessary amount of water. The total length of the collection tunnels and canals in the catchment area is 165 km, of which 72 km are tunnels and 6.45 km are sag pipes.

The three power plants of the cascade were rehabilitated and modernized in 1996–2003, increasing their capacity from 233 MW to 254.2 MW by installing more efficient components. The management was automated and connected to the central management of the national network, the output frequencies and voltages were improved, the process of activating the power plants to full load was accelerated to 4–5 minutes.

== See also ==
- Energy in Bulgaria
- Hydroelectricity in Bulgaria
- Dospat–Vacha Hydropower Cascade
- Geography of Bulgaria
- Rhodope Mountains
