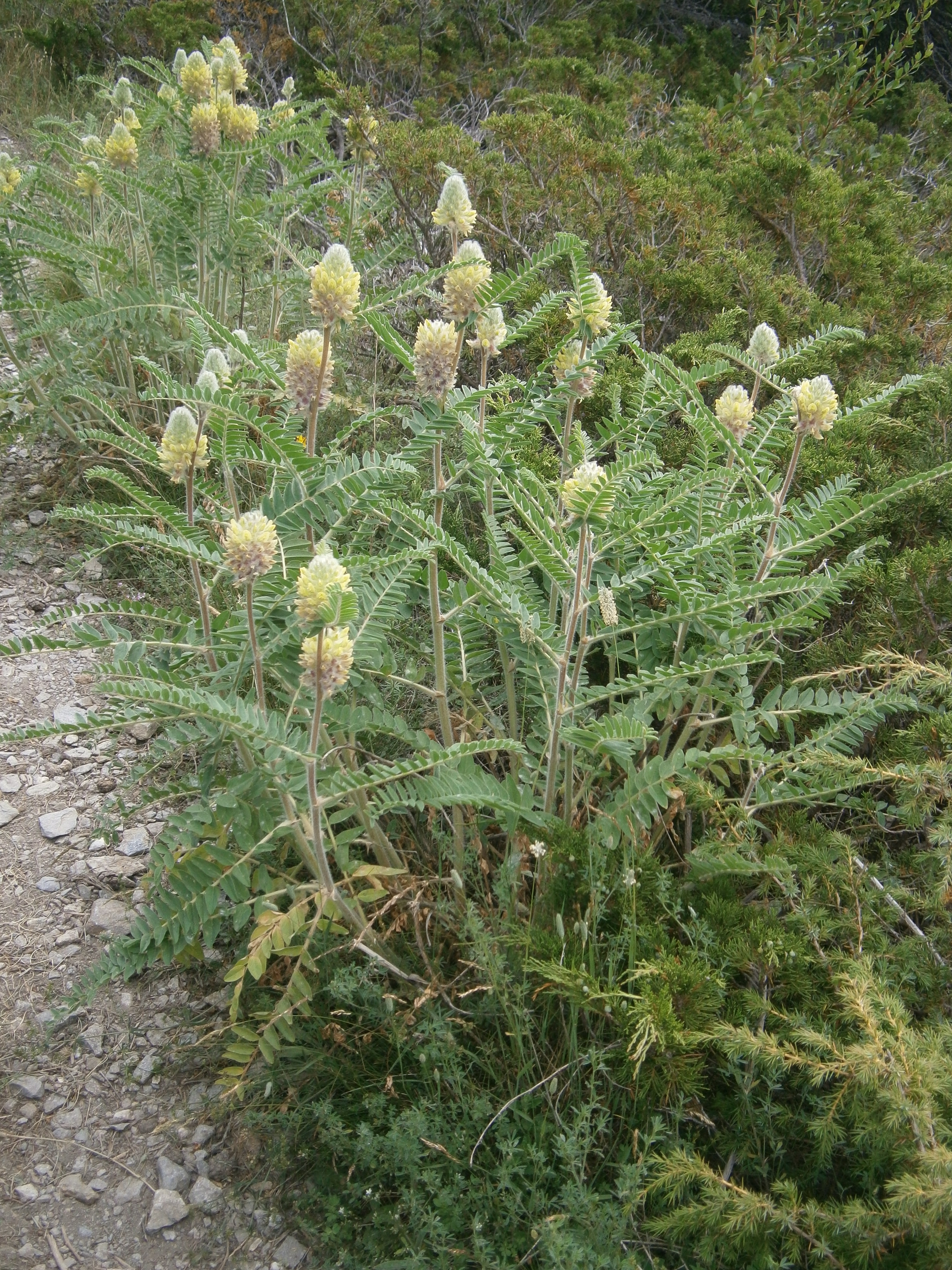
- Plant in the Queyras

Scientific classification
- Kingdom: Plantae
- Clade: Tracheophytes
- Clade: Angiosperms
- Clade: Eudicots
- Clade: Rosids
- Order: Fabales
- Family: Fabaceae
- Subfamily: Faboideae
- Genus: Astragalus
- Species: A. alopecurus

Binomial name
- Astragalus alopecurus Pall.

Synonyms
- Astragalus alopecians K.Koch ex Bunge; Astragalus alopecuroides Ledeb., sensu auct.; Astragalus centralpinus Braun-Blanq.; Astragalus dasysemius (D.F.Chamb. & V.A.Matthews) Ponert; Astragalus dzhawakheticus Bordz.; Astragalus maximus Willd.; Tragacantha alopecurus (Pall.) Kuntze; Tragacantha maxima (Willd.) Kuntze

= Astragalus alopecurus =

Species of legume

Astragalus alopecurus, synonym Astragalus centralpinus, is a species of milkvetch in the family Fabaceae.

== Description ==
Astragalus alopecurus can reach a height of 50–90 centimetres (20–35 in). The hairy stem has a diameter of about 10 mm. Leaves are petiolated, 20–30 centimetres (7.9–11.8 in) long, with rachis covered with ascending hairs. Leaflets are ovate to elliptic, in 20-25 pairs. The inflorescences are in clusters subsessile or with peduncle up to 1 cm, ovoid to cylindrical, 5–9.5 centimetres (2.0–3.7 in), while bracts reach 10–20 millimetres (0.39–0.79 in). Petals are yellow and glabrous. This plant blooms from June to August.

== Distribution ==
Astragalus alopecurus has a wide native distribution, from Europe (Bulgaria, Italy, France, eastern European Russia) to temperate Asia (the Caucasus, Iran, Kazakhstan, Siberia, Turkey, Turkmenistan and Xinjiang in China).

== Habitat ==
It can be found in mountain regions at an elevation 1,400–2,000 metres (4,600–6,600 ft) above sea level.

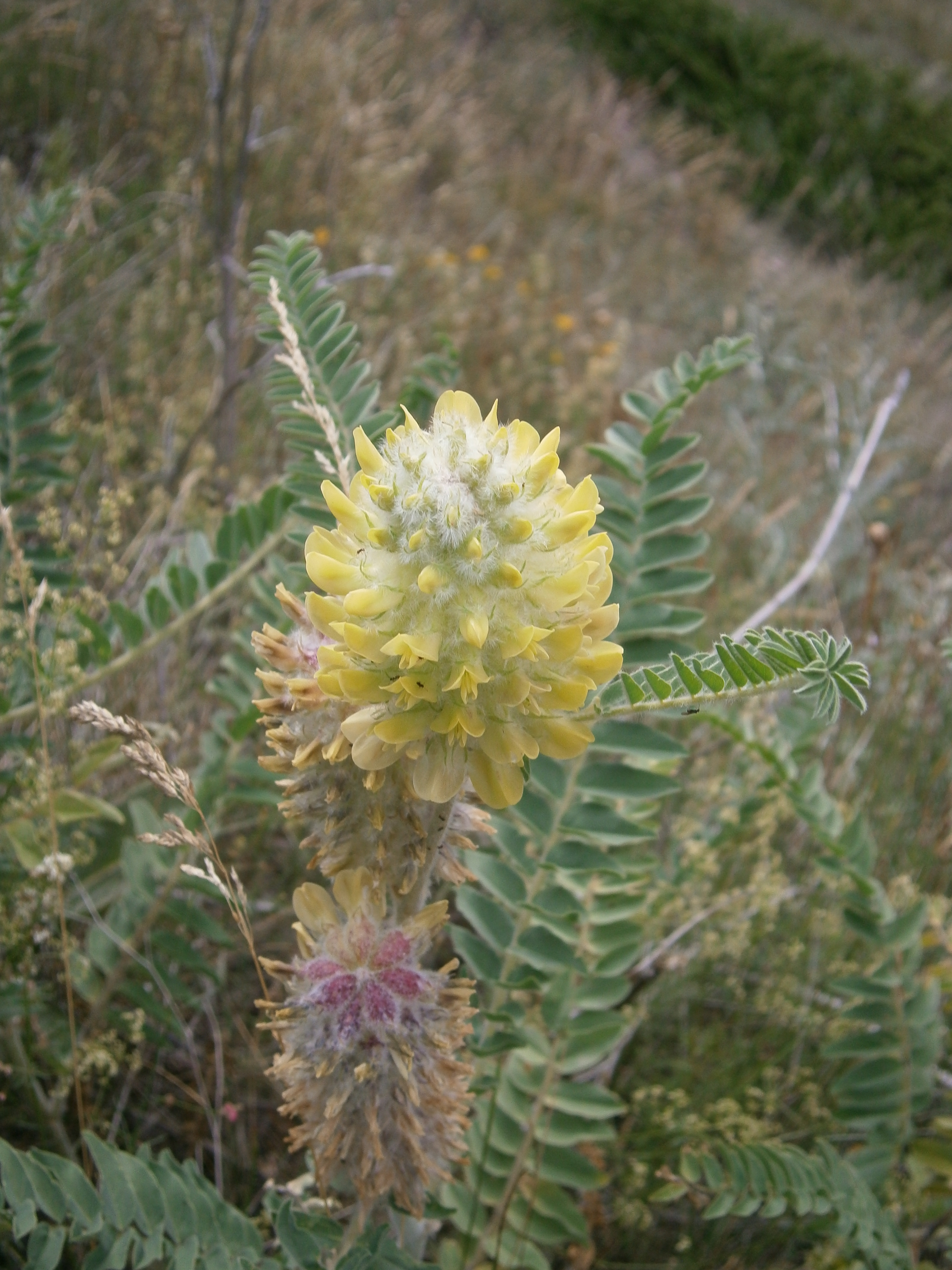
Flowers in the Queyras
