= Aleko Hydro Power Plant =

Hydroelectric power plant in Bulgaria

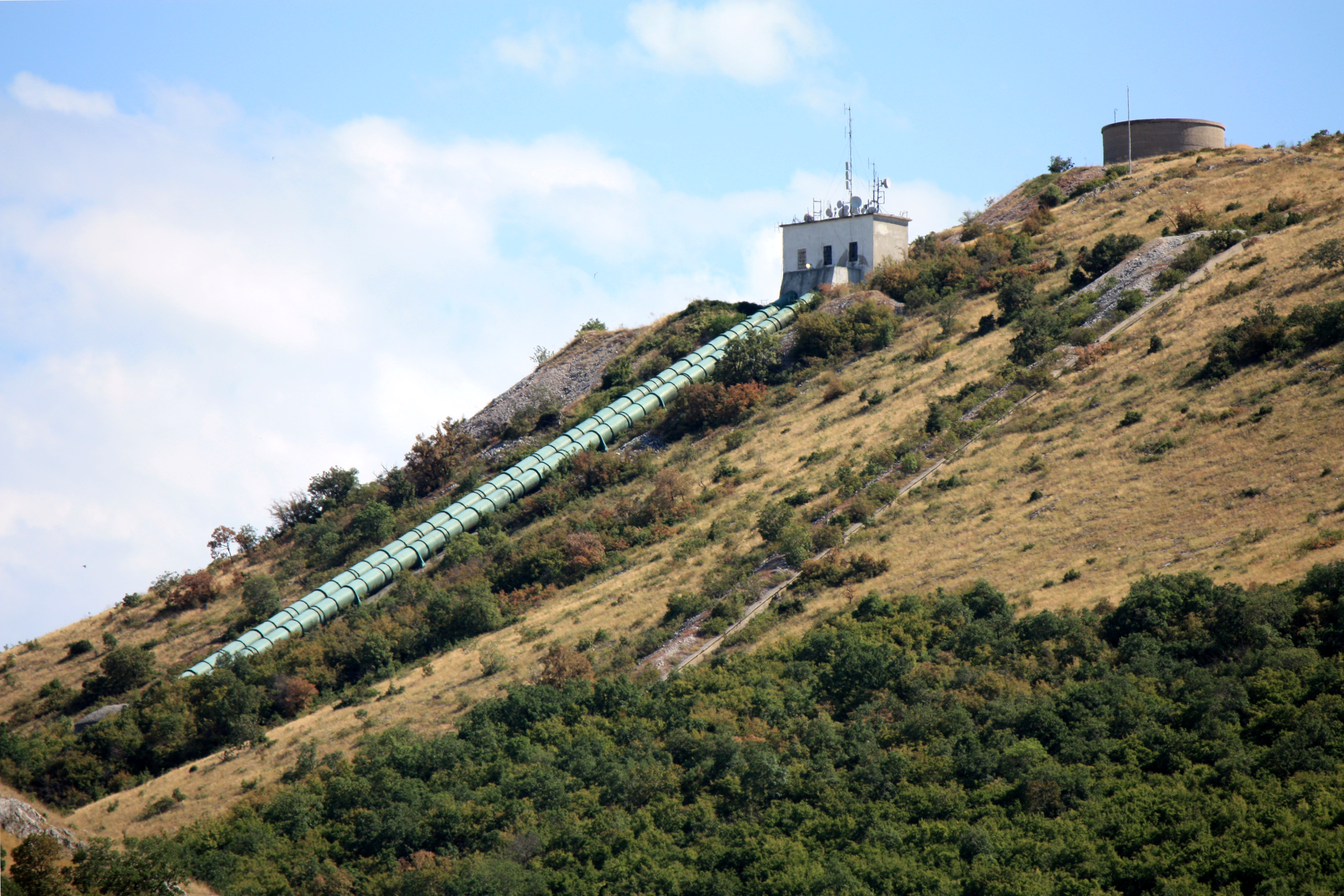
- Country: Bulgaria
- Location: Aleko Konstantinovo
- Coordinates: 42°7′9″N 24°17′20″E
- Status: Operational
- Commission date: 1959
- Owner: NEK EAD
- Operator: NEK EAD

Thermal power station
- Primary fuel: Hydropower

Power generation
- Units operational: 3
- Nameplate capacity: 71.4 MW

External links
- Commons: Related media on Commons

The Aleko Hydro Power Plant is an active hydroelectric project near Aleko Konstantinovo, Bulgaria, which is part of the Batak Hydropower Cascade. It has 3 individual Francis turbines with an installed capacity of 71.4 MW of power.
