= Peshtera Hydroelectric Power Station =

Hydro power plant in Peshtera, Bulgaria

Peshtera Hydro Power Plant
- Country: Bulgaria
- Location: Peshtera
- Coordinates: 42°1′0″N 24°15′21″E
- Status: Operational
- Commission date: 1959
- Owner: NEK EAD
- Operator: NEK EAD

Thermal power station
- Primary fuel: Hydropower

Power generation
- Units operational: 5
- Nameplate capacity: 136 MW

The Peshtera Hydro Power Plant (before 1992: Kimon Georgiev Hydro Power Plant) is an active underground hydroelectric plant in Peshtera, Bulgaria. It is part of the Batak Hydropower Cascade. It has 5 individual Pelton turbines which can deliver up to 136 MW of power.
