= Gashnya =

Location
- Country: Bulgaria

Physical characteristics
- Source
  - location: SE of Batashki Snezhnik, Rhodope Mountains
  - coordinates: 41°52′57″N 24°15′20.88″E
  - elevation: 2,018 m (6,621 ft)
- Mouth
  - location: Vacha
  - coordinates: 41°49′14.88″N 24°26′21.12″E
  - elevation: 689 m (2,260 ft)
- Length: 20 km (12 mi)
- Basin size: 54 km^{2} (21 sq mi)

Basin features
- Progression: Vacha→ Maritsa→ Aegean Sea

The Gashnya (Bulgarian: Гашня) is a 20 km long river in southern Bulgaria, flowing through Pazardzhik and Smolyan Provinces. It is a left tributary of the Vacha, itself a right tributary of the Maritsa. There are no settlements along its course.

The river springs at an altitude of 2,018 m from the southeastern slopes of the summit of Batashki Snezhnik (2,082 m) in the Batak Mountain of the western Rhodope Mountains. It flows in eastern–southeastern direction in a deep forested valley. At an altitude of 689 m the Gashnya flows into the Tsankov Kamak Reservoir, just upstream of its dam, constructed on the river Vacha.

Its drainage basin covers a territory of 54 km^{2}, or 3.3% of the Vacha's total. The Gashnya has predominantly rain–snow feed with high water in April–May and low water in October. Part of the waters along its upper course are diverted west to be utilized for electricity generation at the Batak Hydropower Cascade (254 MW), while the rest are utilized at the Dospat–Vacha Hydropower Cascade (500.2 MW).
