= Golyam Beglik =

Golyam Beglik reservoir
- язовир Голям Беглик (Bulgarian)
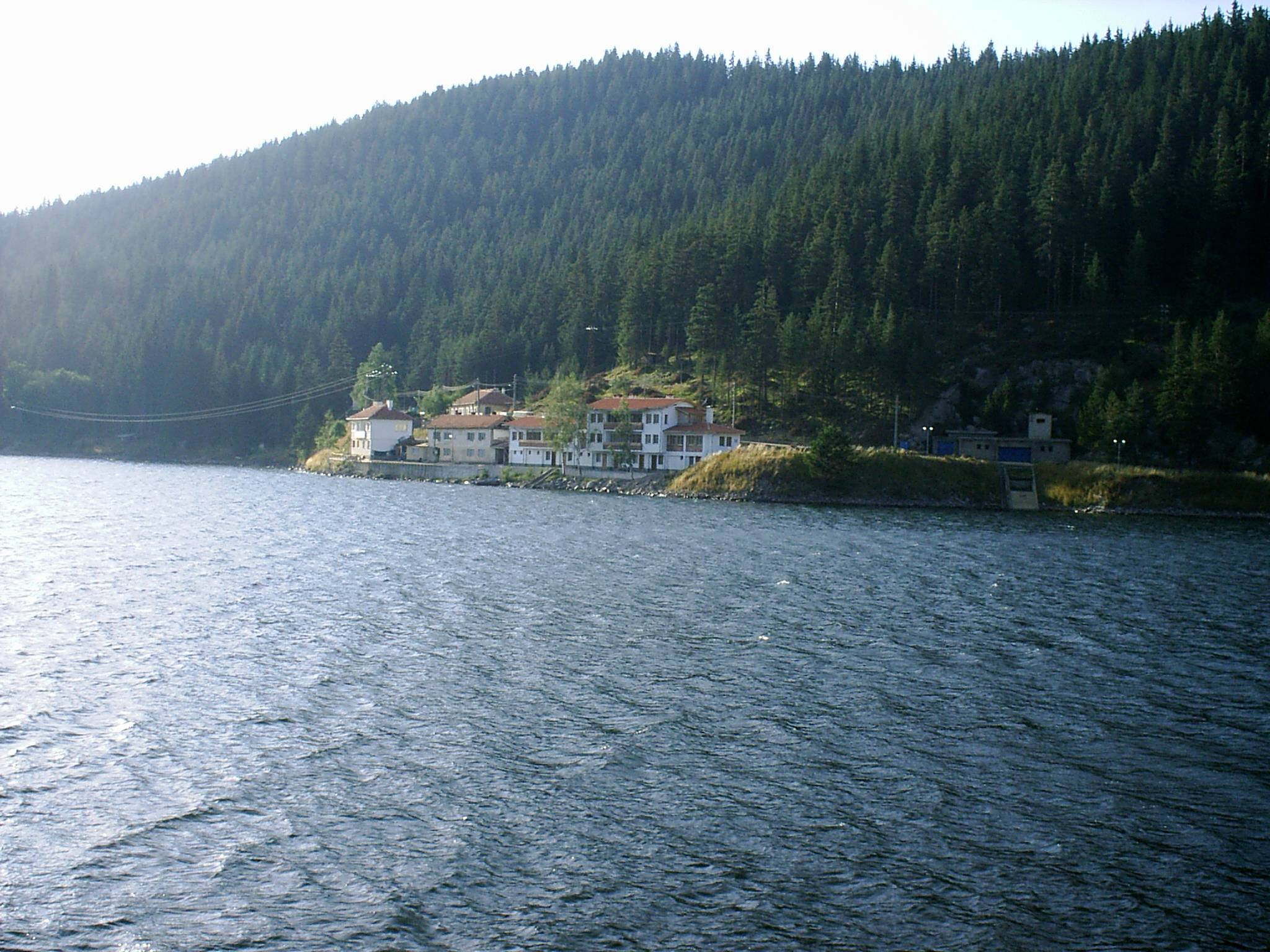
- A view of the reservoir

- Location within Bulgaria
- Location: Pazardzhik Province, Rhodope Mountains
- Coordinates: 41°48′54″N 24°7′8″E
- Lake type: reservoir
- Basin countries: Bulgaria
- Max. length: 5.5 km (3.4 mi)
- Max. width: 5 km (3.1 mi)
- Surface area: 4.1 km^{2} (1.6 sq mi)
- Water volume: 62.1×10^{6} m^{3} (50,300 acre⋅ft)

Golyam Beglik is a reservoir near the central parts of the Rhodope Mountains, Bulgaria. It was formerly officially called the Vasil Kolarov reservoir in honour of Vasil Kolarov, a communist political leader of the People's Republic of Bulgaria.

== Geography ==
The reservoirs Batak, Beglika, Shiroka Polyana and Golyam Beglik are the main tourist places in the region of Batak. Except Batak, the other dam lakes are located to the north and to the south between 1,450 and 1,560 m altitude, and Golyam Beglik is the largest in area- 4,1 km^{2}.

The area around Golyam Beglik and the other reservoirs is called Beglika Plain. It is surrounded by the Batak Mountain (Баташка планина) and Syutkya Range from the north and west, and is gradually merged with the Veliytsa-Videnitsa Range of the Rhodope Mountains and its branches on the south and east.

Golyam Beglik is supplied by small rivers and streams from Syutkya Range, of which the largest ones are Cherno Dere and Zhalto Dere. It discharges by a stream that joins another stream coming from the smaller Beglika reservoir. These two streams form Devinska River which flows into Vacha River, and then to Maritsa River.

== Flora and fauna ==
The area around Golyam Beglik is included in the Beglika Natural Reserve that covers large parts of Beglika Plain. Most of this area is covered by coniferous forests, mainly Norwegian spruce and White pine. The Beglika Plain has a rich variety of mountain streams with a lot of meadows around them.

There is a large diversity of wildlife near the reservoir territory. There are Eurasian brown bears, deer, red foxes, Eurasian wolves, as well as smaller animals such as rabbits, hedgehogs, squirrels. There are also many wild ducks and geese near its water areas. The place is well suited for developing hunting tourism that is traditional in the region.

== Tourism ==
The main way to reach Golyam Beglik and the surrounding area is by the road connecting the towns of Batak and Dospat. Currently, tourism is not very developed, and there are only some private villa areas, and a small private hotel, called Siniya Zaliv (Blue Bay). An interesting place is Chatama (Чатъма), located at the western shores of the reservoir. This is not only a complex of bungalows that offer accommodation, but also a center of Bikearea organization that provides summer camps, trekking, biking and other kinds of adventurous tours.
