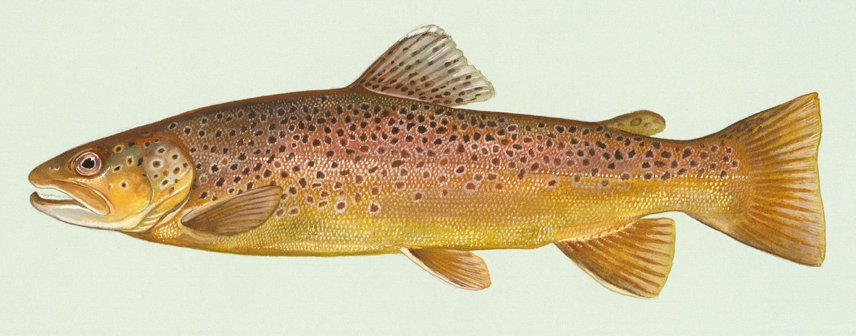

Scientific classification
- Kingdom: Animalia
- Phylum: Chordata
- Class: Actinopterygii
- Division: Teleostei
- Order: Salmoniformes
- Family: Salmonidae
- Genus: Salmo
- Species: S. trutta
- Subspecies: S. t. fario

Trinomial name
- Salmo trutta fario Linnaeus, 1758

= Salmo trutta fario =

River trout

Subspecies of Salmo trout

Salmo trutta fario, sometimes called the river trout, is a river-dwelling freshwater predatory fish from the genus Salmo of the family Salmonidae. It is one of the three main subspecies of the brown trout (Salmo trutta), besides sea trout (Salmo trutta trutta) and the lacustrine trout (Salmo trutta lacustris).

== Description ==
Depending on the supply of food, river trout measure 20 to 80 cm (0.66 to 2.62 ft) in length; exceptionally, they may be up to 1 m (3 ft 3 in) long and weigh up to over 13 kg (29 lb), although they usually attain an average weight of up to 2 kg (4.4 lb). Their back is olive-dark brown and silvery blue, red spots with light edges occur towards the belly, and the belly is whitish yellow. They can live for up to 18 years.

== Habitat ==
Like other salmonids, river trout live in cool, fast-flowing, oxygen-rich, clear waters with gravel or sandy riverbeds. Their native ranges occur across almost all of Europe, from Portugal on the Iberian Peninsula to the Volga in Russia, and are found as far north as Lapland. They can be found in most northern Mediterranean and western Black Sea tributaries but not in Central Anatolia and the Caucasus regions or on Corsica, Sardinia and Sicily islands.

River trout are faithful to their habitat, leaving the home range stream for smaller upstream headwaters to reproduce. Even after being disturbed, they return to their traditional sites. The adult river trout requires its territory. During the day, it is hidden in the shadows of the river bank, facing upstream.

Depending on size and habitat, they feed mainly on insects and their larvae, small baitfish (such as European bullhead), small crustaceans, snails and other water animals. Cannibalism has also been frequently observed among river trout. They are fast-swimming pursuit predators, but in faster-flowing rivers and streams, they are usually opportunistic and will take prey that is floating past by the current.

== Reproduction ==
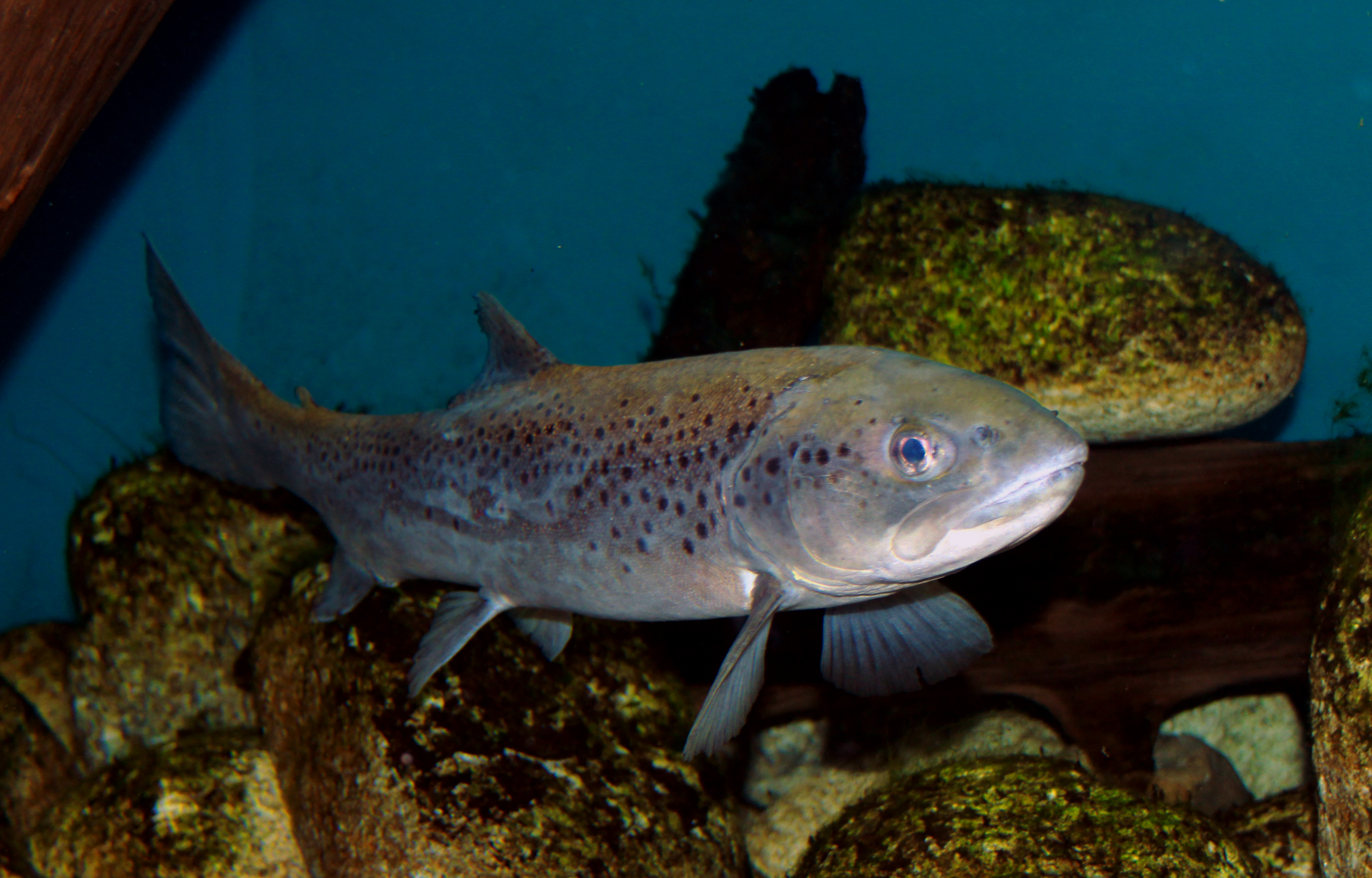
River trout in the "Subaqueous Vltava" exhibition, Prague

River trout spawn between October and January in the Northern Hemisphere, and introduced populations in the Southern Hemisphere spawn between May and June. The fish uses rapid fanning of the tail and caudal fin on a rock riverbed to make several shallow pits, into which about 1,000 to 1,500 reddish eggs 4–5 mm (0.16–0.20 in) in size are laid. The fish larvae emerge after two to four months.

== Ecology ==
The river trout has special significance as a host fish for the glochidia of the freshwater pearl mussel (Margaritifera margaritifera).

== Other forms ==
Because trout live in habitats with fixed boundaries, in addition to the river trout, Salmo trutta fario, there are various other subspecies of Salmo trutta. See Species of Trout.

== Hybrids ==
The tiger trout (Salmo trutta fario × Salvelinus fontinalis) is a genetic cross between a river trout and a brook trout. It gets its name from its characteristic golden-yellow markings. Tiger trout are sterile, although male and female trout may be distinguished by their external markings. The female tiger trout does not develop any gonads. By contrast, male tiger trout develop testicles as well as secondary sex features such as kypes, humps, darker and thicker skin and lighter fillet colouring during the spawning season.

== Fishing ==
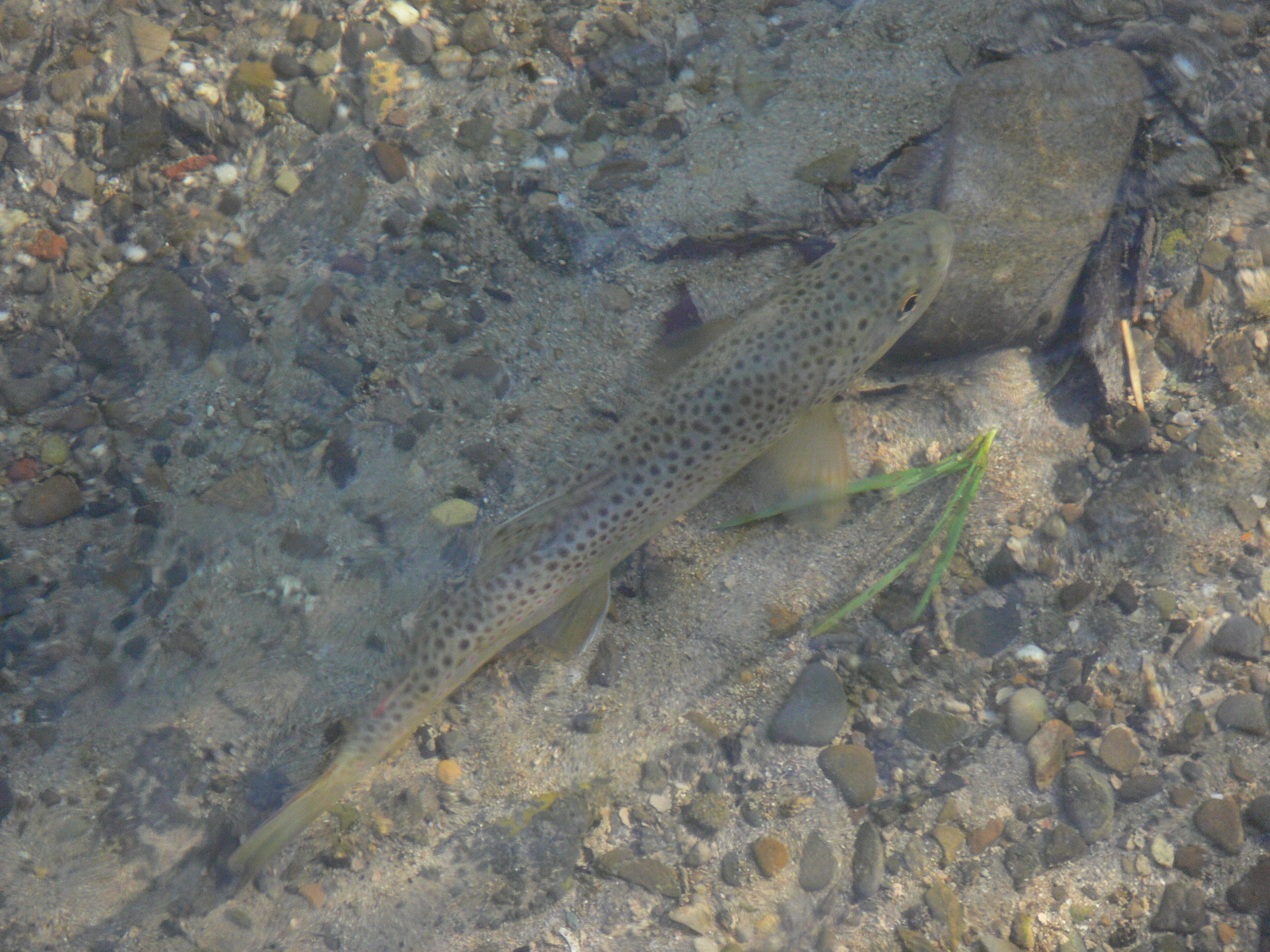
Well camouflaged river trout in a small stream

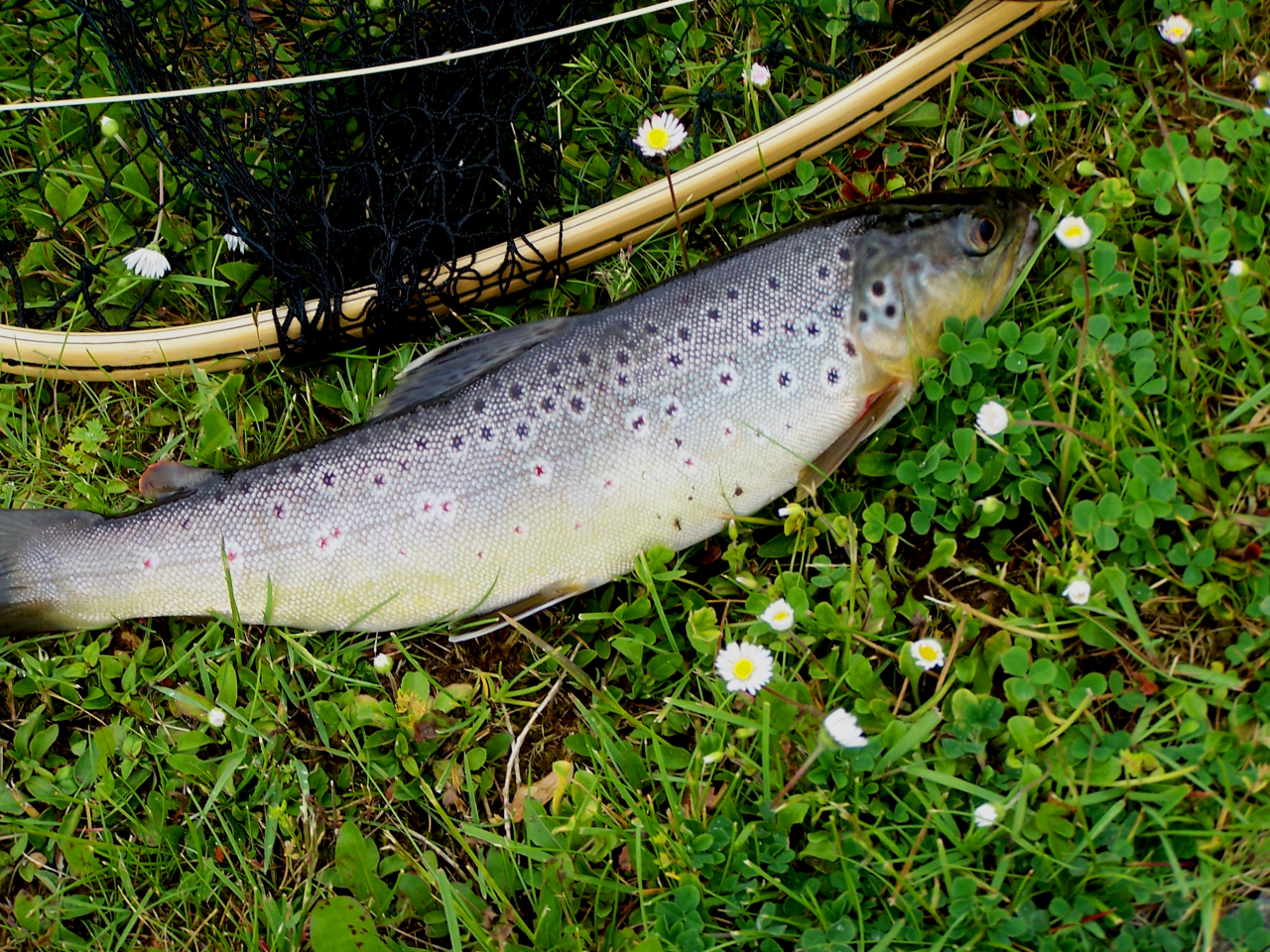
River trout caught with the help of a fly

In the past, European waterbodies were heavily and artificially stocked with rainbow trout, a native of America that grows more quickly and is less demanding of water quality. It is disputed whether this threatens the river trout. Today, it is bred in fishponds with almost the same success rate as the rainbow trout for food and restocking rivers. To protect native species of fish, the stocking of rivers, with non-native species has been restricted for several years.

River trout makes an excellent fish dish.

=== Angling ===
River trout is very popular with anglers. It is frequently fished using artificial lures. Angling with natural lures (worms, maggots, grasshoppers) is discouraged in most rivers because it is difficult to throw back trout that are below the minimum landing size uninjured when they have ingested this food so quickly and deeply.

Fly rods are used to catch river trout. Medium-sized, wet and dry flies are thrown into streams with a rod of AFTMA Class 4-6, intended to mimic an emerging or egg-laying insect. A spinning rod can also be used in some waters. For this purpose, a light spinning rod and various artificial lures, such as spoon lures and spinners, are used. Fish care should be taken when using wobblers and rubber because they are banned on some waterbodies or may only be used with restrictions.

== Research use ==
The fish has been used as a bio-indicator species in freshwater systems due to their sensitive nature. They are a well-established 'model organism' in aquatic toxicology research, especially for heavy metal bioaccumulation.

== Literature ==
- Fritz Terofal: Süsswasserfische in europäischen Gewässern. Mit 200 farbigen Darstellungen von Fritz Wendler. Mosaik Verlag u. a., München u. a. 1984, ISBN 3-570-01274-3.
- Alexander Kölbing, Kurt Seifert: So macht Angeln Spass. Mehr wissen – mehr fangen. 5., durchgesehene Auflage. BLV, München u. a. 1995, ISBN 3-405-13746-2.
- Roland Gerstmeier, Thomas Romig: Die Süßwasserfische Europas. Für Naturfreunde und Angler. Kosmos, Stuttgart 1998, ISBN 3-440-07068-9.
