= Batak, Bulgaria =

Batak Батак
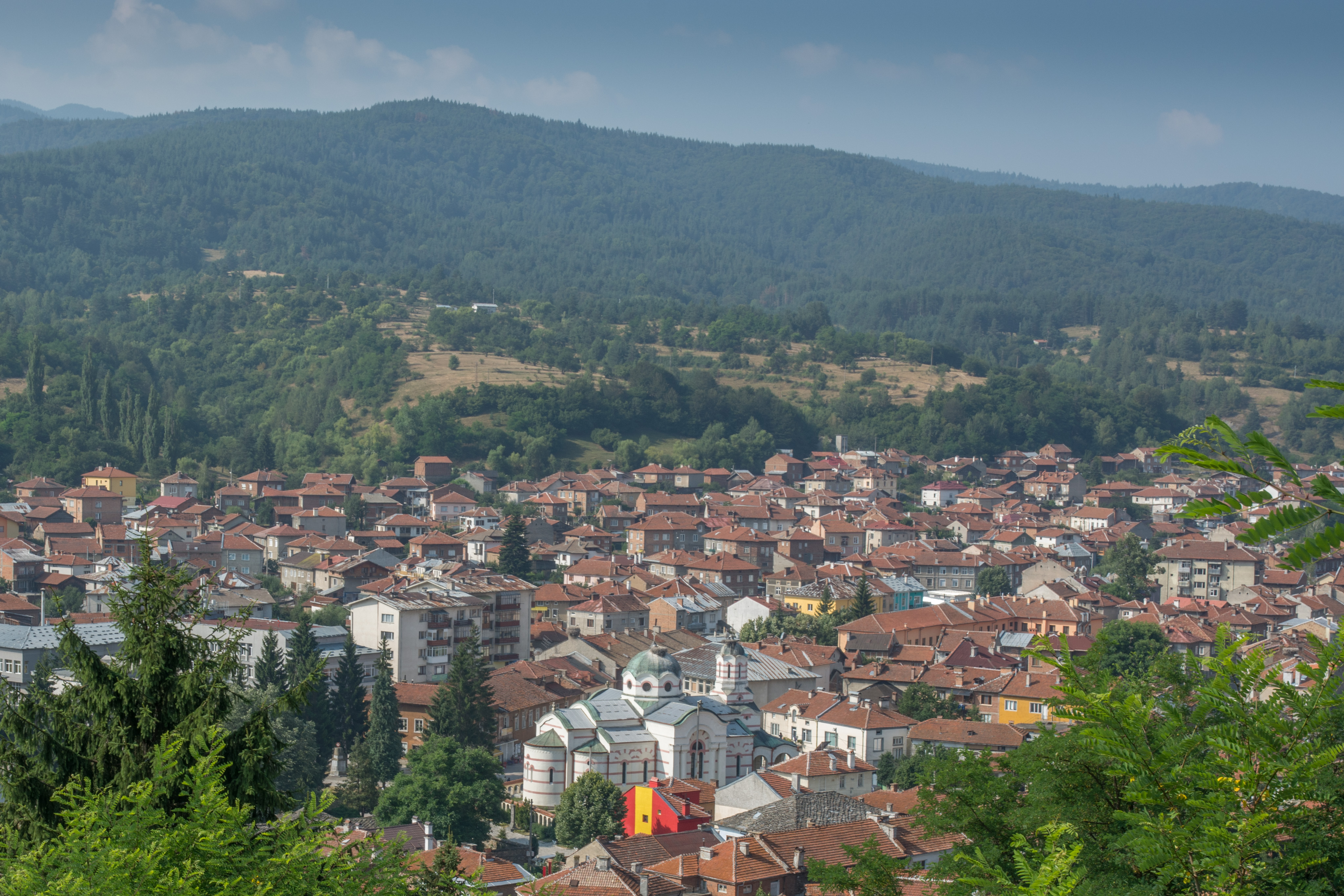

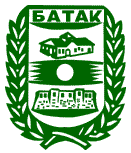
- Coat of arms

- Location of Batak, Bulgaria
- Coordinates: 41°57′N 24°13′E
- Country: Bulgaria
- Provinces (Oblast): Pazardzhik

Government
  - Mayor: Petar Paunov
- Elevation: 1,036 m (3,399 ft)

Population (31.12.2009)
  - Total: 3,498
- Time zone: UTC+2 (EET)
  - Summer (DST): UTC+3 (EEST)
- Postal Code: 4580
- Area code: 03553

Batak (Bulgarian: Батак [ˈbɐtak]) is a town in Pazardzhik Province, southern Bulgaria, not far from the town of Peshtera. It is the administrative centre of the homonymous Batak Municipality. As of December 2009, the town had a population of 3,498.

== Geography ==
Batak is situated in the northwestern slopes of the Rhodope Mountains, at 1036 m above sea level. It is surrounded by many peaks, clad with century-old pine and spruce forests. The river Stara reka, a right tributary of the Maritsa, flows through the town. The climate is temperate continental with a characteristic southern warm wind. Batak was pronounced town in 1964 and has a population of 4,019 people. Batak is a centre of one of Bulgaria's largest municipalities by terms of territory - 667 km^{2} or 15% of the Pazardzhik Province area - as well as one of the most sparsely populated ones including only the town itself and two villages - Fotinovo and Nova Mahala. Ninety percent of the municipal area is covered with thick forests.

Batak is situated at 15 km to the south of Peshtera and 33 km to the south of the regional centre Pazardzhik. The nearest railway station is in Peshtera.

== History ==
=== Antiquity ===
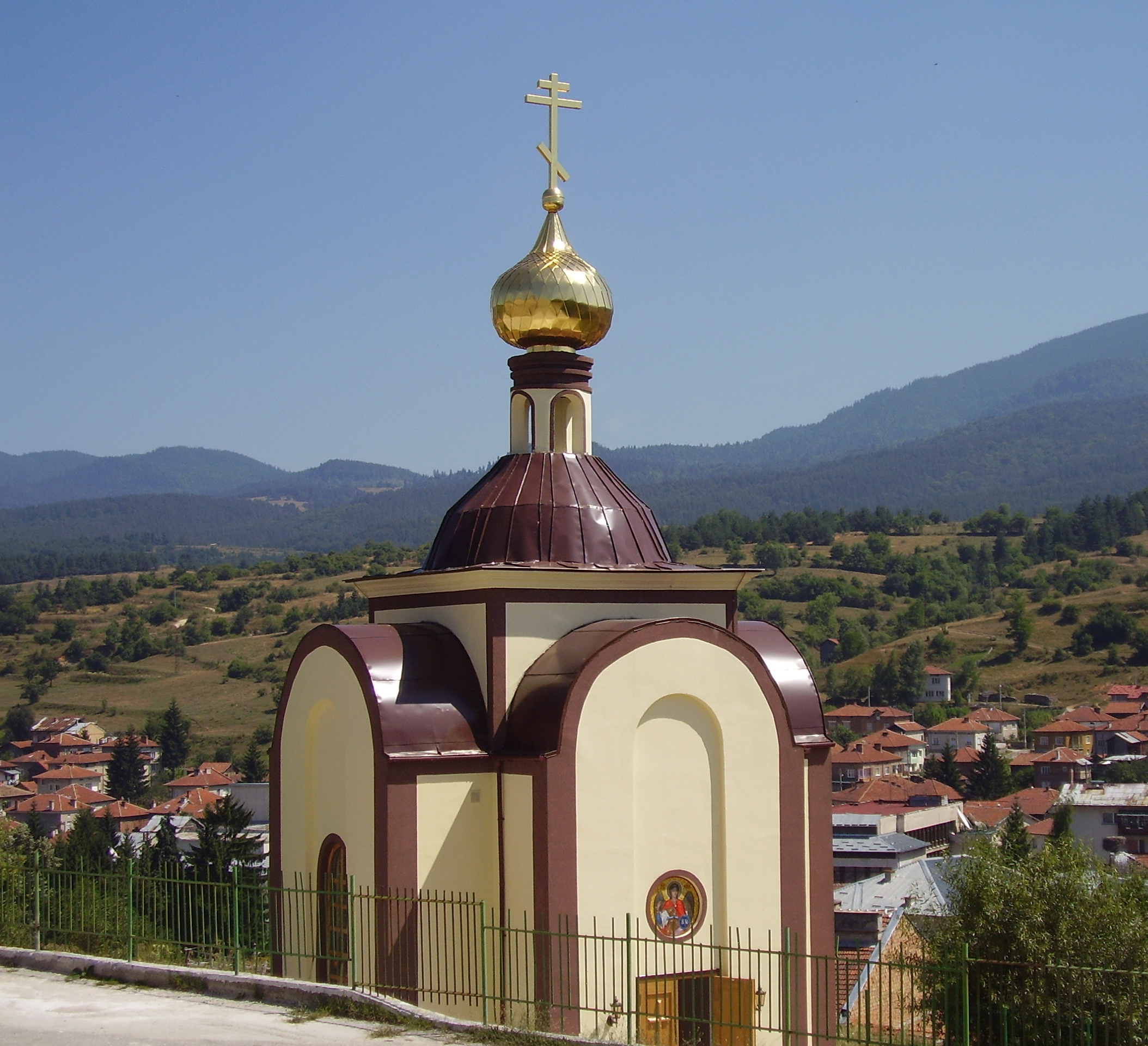
The Russian church in Batak.

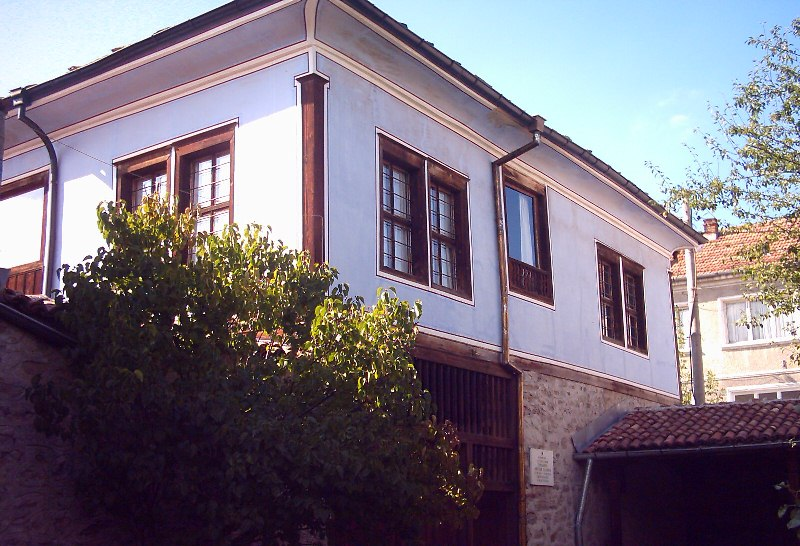
The Balinova house.

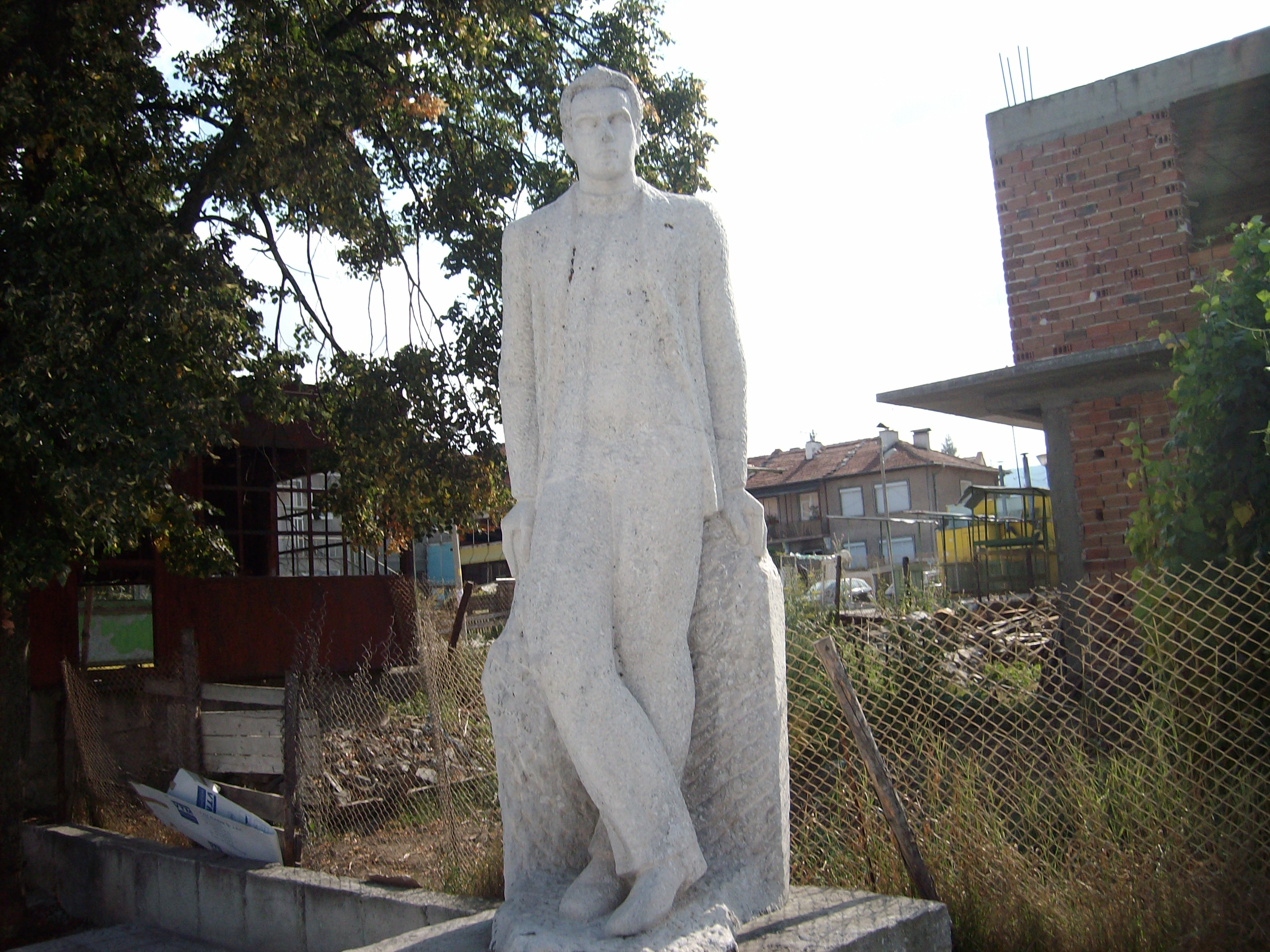
The monument of Trendafil Balinov.

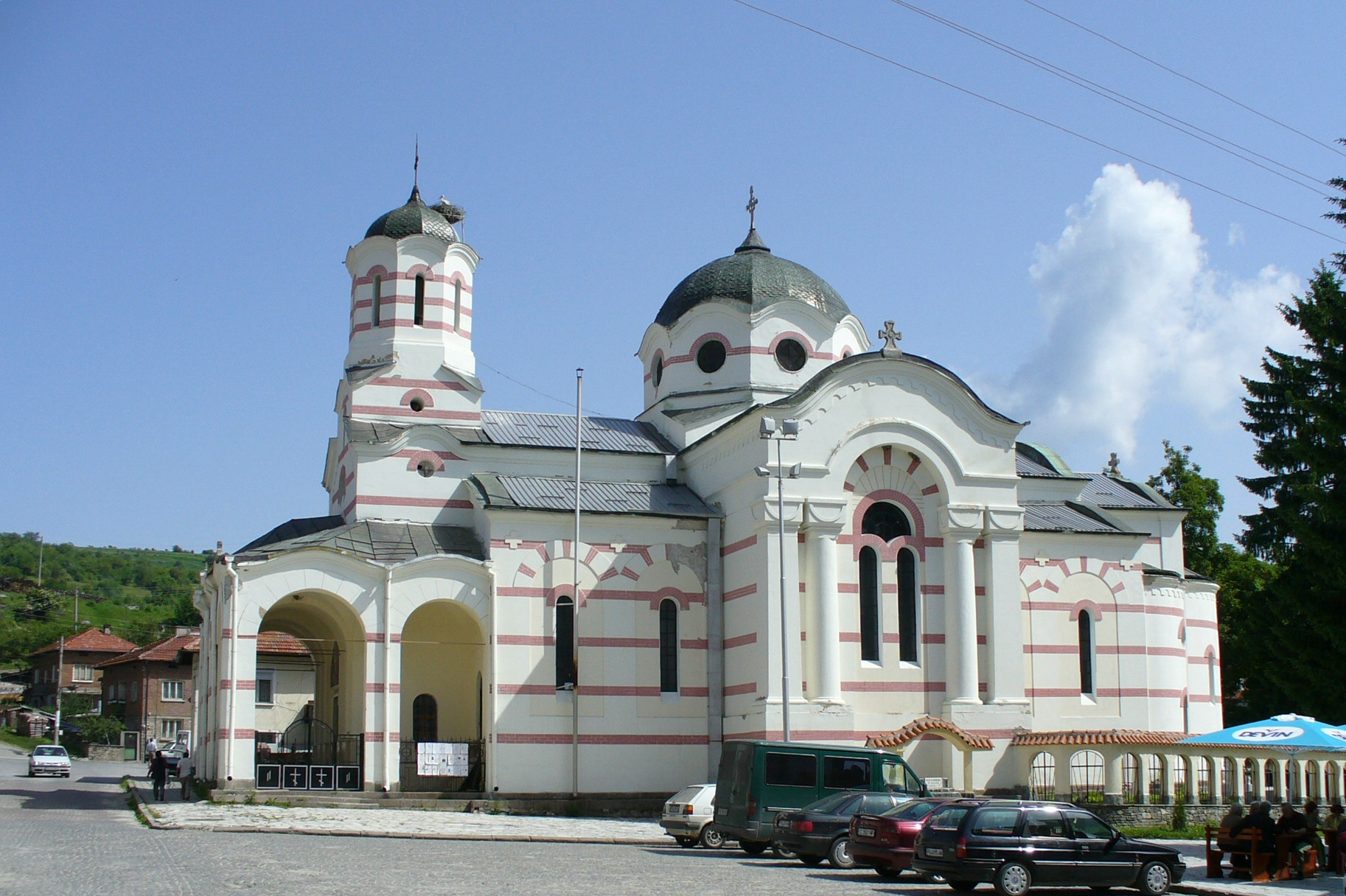
The church in Batak.

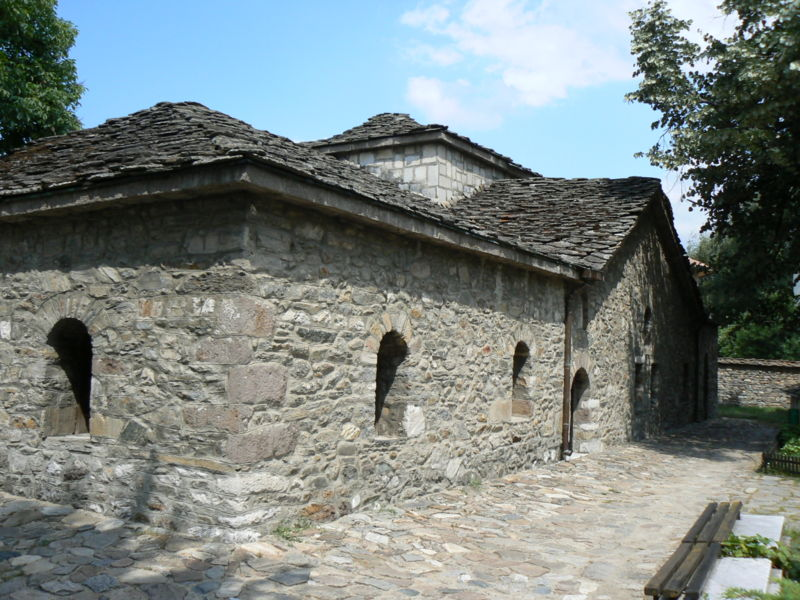
Batak, the old church.

There are numerous archaeological monuments of most ancient times in the region of Batak. A find of the Old Stone Age was discovered in 1958. Tools, objects, ceramic vessels, ornaments as well as bones of rhinoceros were found which proves that the climate was warmer in the Quaternary. Twenty Thracian, Thraco-Roman, Byzantine and Slavic fortresses, churches and monasteries, as well as Thracian mounds, Roman bridges, mines, mills and other archaeological sites were registered.

=== Origin of the settlement and medieval history ===
The exact origin of Batak is unknown, since there is a lack of historical data. The earlier view that the settlement was founded by Bulgarians who escaped from the forced mass conversion into Islam in the valley of Chepino in 16th century today is rejected because it is believed that the settlement is much older. This is justified by an inscription on the fountain of Virgin Mary Monastery of Krichim built by the people of Batak in 1592, a writ of the feudal possessions of Sultan Suleiman I (1520–1566), in which the village of Batak is also mentioned, as well as the remnants of many churches and monasteries burnt down by the Ottomans during the conversion into Islam in this region. The origin of the name of Batak is not certain, too. In the old legends it is related to the Tsepina chieftain Batoy, while the history professors Yordan Ivanov and Vasil Mikov suppose that Batak was Potok, a settlement of Cuman origin existing between the 11th and the 13th century. It is, however, certain that the name of the village is Bulgarian, not Turkish as some authors assert.

=== Ottoman rule ===
During the centuries of Ottoman rule, many hajduks in the region of Batak took revenge from the Turks for the outrages upon Bulgarian people – Strahil Voivoda, Deli Arshenko Payaka, Gola Voda, Todor Banchev, Beyko, Yanko Kavlakov, Mityo Vranchev, etc. From these times have remained the old rebel names, such as Haydushka Skala, Haydushka Polyana, Haydushko Kladenche (spring), Sablen Vrah ("Sabre Peak"), Karvav Chuchur ("Bloody Spout"), as well as many legends.

Woodworking, trade and innkeeping were developed in Batak during the National Revival. The prosperity of the population was conducive to the prosperity of education — a secular school was opened in 1835 and the St. Nedelya Church was built in 1813 at the Todor Balinov place (mayor of the village at the time), donated by him specifically for the construction of the church. Built for 75 days with the work of citizens of Batak.. Batak has given many eminent figures of the Bulgarian Revival, such as clerics like archimandrite Yosif, Nikifor, Kiril and others, who worked in the Rila Monastery, a centre of the Bulgarian National Revival. Famous men of letters are Georgi Busilin and Dragan Manchov.

=== April Uprising and Ottoman war-crimes ===
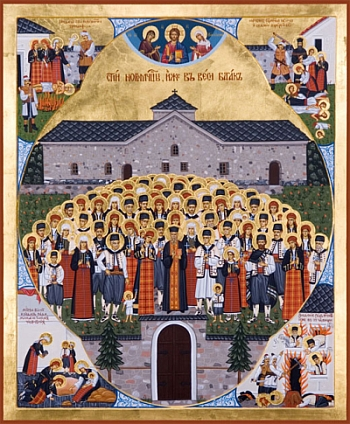
Icon of the Saints from Batak

The population of Batak took part in the April Uprising of 1876. The people of Batak rebelled on 22 April under the leadership of voivoda Petar Goranov. On 30 April the village was surrounded by Ottoman irregulars called bashi-bozouk, pomaks from the surrounding villages. The battles were carried on for five days. The last stronghold of the rebels was the St. Nedelya Church.

At the end five thousand people were killed (though this number is disputed), and the village was burned down to ashes. News of the atrocities spread around the world, aided in large part by Januarius MacGahan's writing for the London Daily News . The public outcry created favourable conditions for Russia to declare war on Turkey. On 20 January 1878 the Bulgarians of Batak who had survived the massacre enthusiastically met the advancing Russian army.

=== Batak today ===
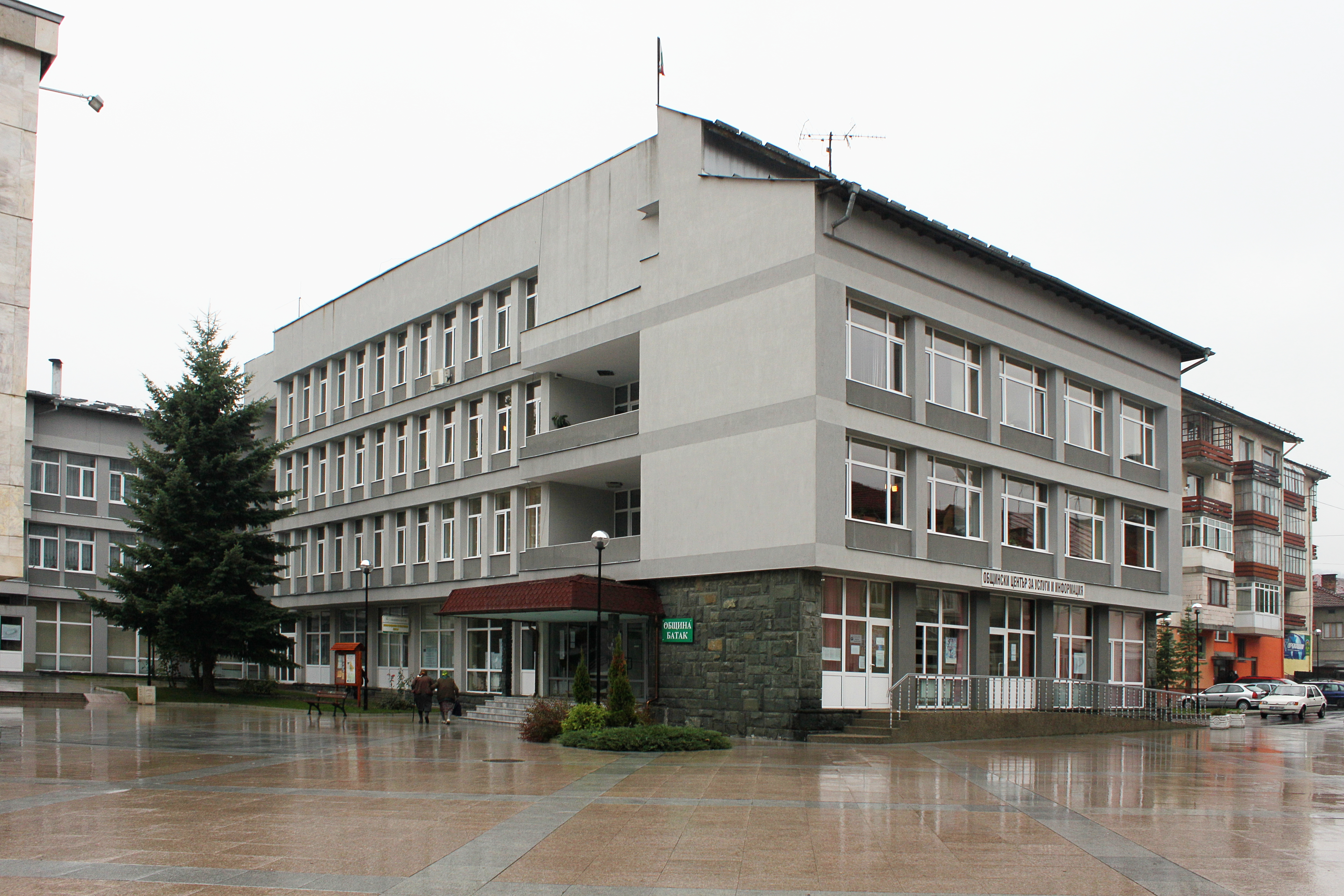
City hall in Batak

Today Batak is a renovated modern town famous for its historical monuments and a resort and tourist centre. A key hydro power system — Batak Hydropower Cascade — with five dams and three hydroelectric stations was constructed in the 1950s. Rest houses, tourist complexes and villas have been built along the banks of the Batak Reservoir.

== Honour ==
Batak Point on Smith Island, South Shetland Islands is named after Batak.

== Education ==
- Chitalishte "4 - May"
- "Otets Paisiy" Primary school
- Stefan Bozhkov High School of Forestry and Wood Processing

== Religion ==
- Orthodox Church Saint Maria
