= Botevgrad History Museum =

Coordinates: 43°54′23.66″N 23°47′33.67″E

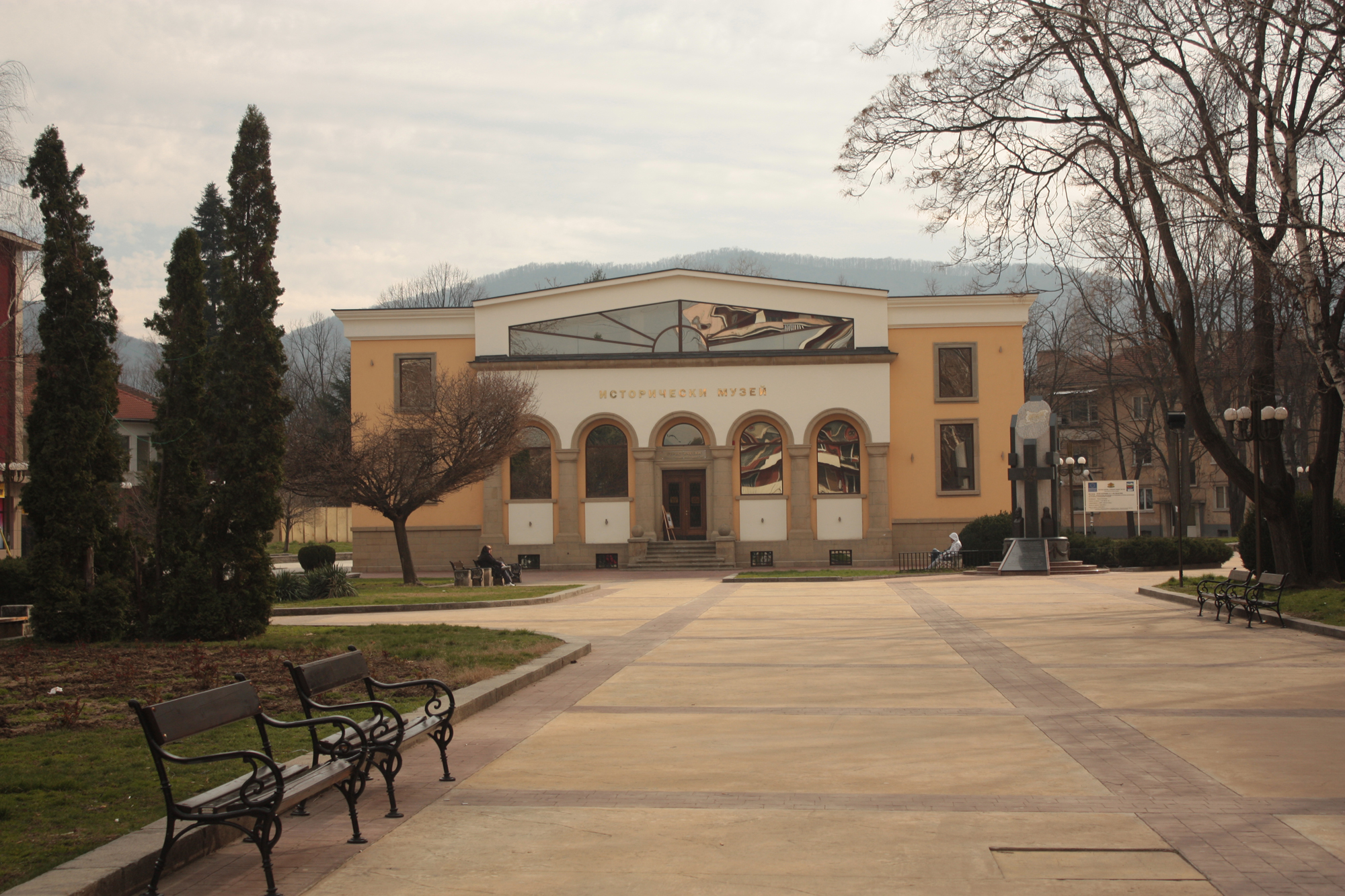
Building of the Botevgrad History Museum

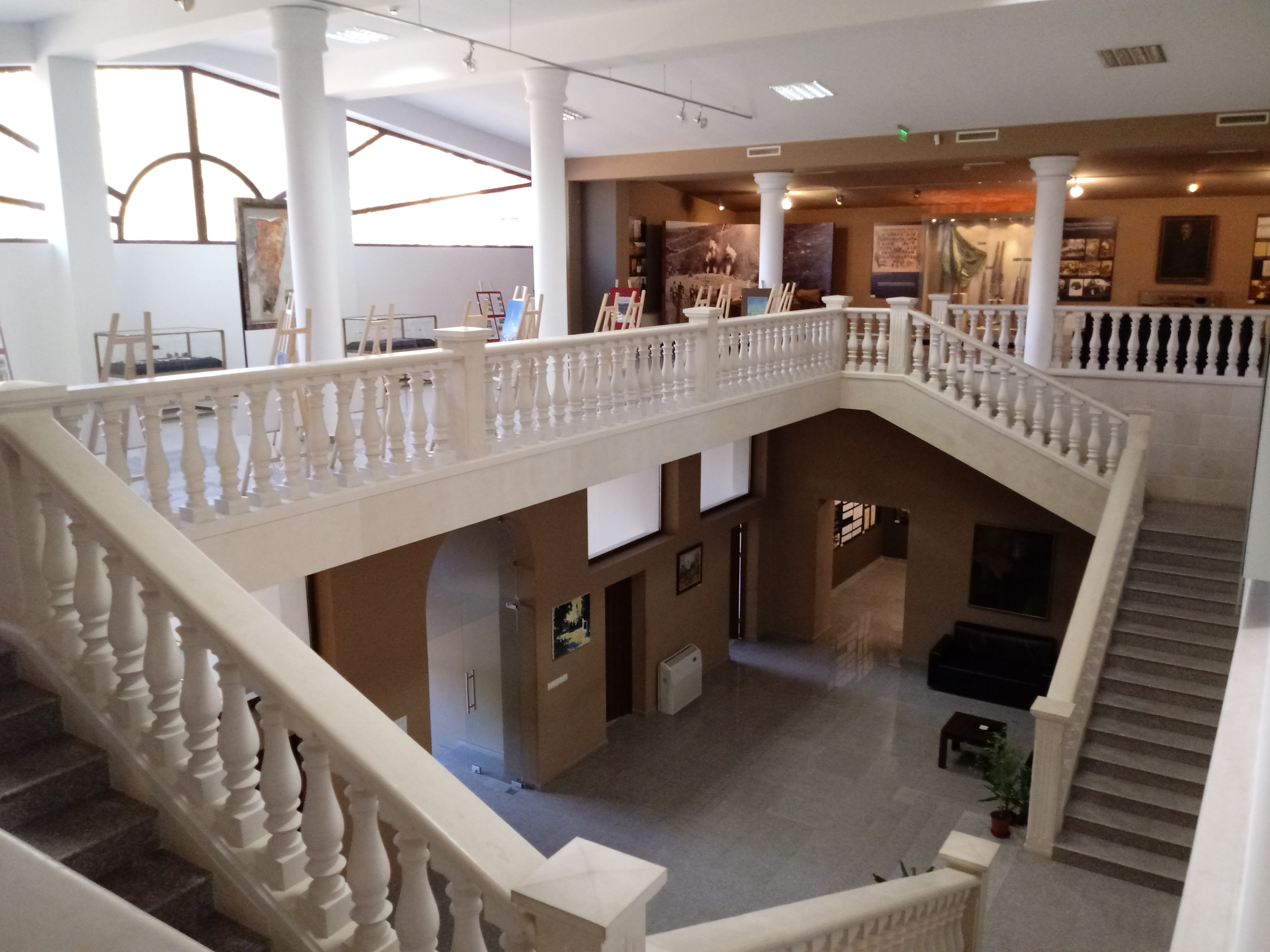
Interior of the museum

Botevgrad History Museum (Bulgarian: Ботевградски исторически музей) was inaugurated in 1937. The museum is located at Saransk Square in the centre of Botevgrad, western Bulgaria.

== History ==
The museum work in the region of Botevgrad has deep roots and traditions. Two of the earliest researchers of Botevgrad's historical past were priest Georgi Popdimitrov from Skravena village, and the long-term teacher from Trudovets village, Georgi Popivanov.

On 10 January 1927 a publication in the local newspaper "Orhanie News" announced the establishment of an archaeological museum as a part of the town's Ivan Vazov Library. The first museum collection was opened for the public in 1937 by the director of the local high school Asen Stefanov.

In 1950, already enriched and extended, the collection was moved to the local culture centre (chitalishte) "Hristo Botev 1884", and two years later the collection was declared a state museum, and was provided with a separate building.

On 24 May 1959 the museum was opened with an inauguration ceremony. In 1970 a second exhibition of the museum was inaugurated. In 1985 the museum was extended with an art collection and the opened an art gallery. From 1988 to 2010 the museum and the art gallery were located in a separate building next to the Botevgrad Clock Tower, the symbol of the town.

On 1 July 2010 commenced the reconstruction of the building of the Law Court in Botevgrad. Less than an year later, on 3 May 2011, the building was re-opened and since then it has been hosting the Botevgrad History Museum.

== Museum collection ==
The museum offers exhibition areas, as well a conference hall equipped for presentations, art exhibitions, concerts, discussions, public lectures and celebrations. The museum develops collection, research, education and popularization activities, and takes part in the organization of events from the cultural calendar of Botevgrad Municipality.

As of 2018, the museum collection contains more than 15 thousand items, including documents, original photographs, personal belongings, armament, old printed literature, numismatic and heraldic artifacts, and art works. These are distributed in three departments: Archaeology, History of Bulgarian lands in 15-20th century, and Art and History of 20th century. Affiliate to the Museum is the cloister school in the village of Bozhenitsa, Botevgrad Municipality.

== Gallery ==
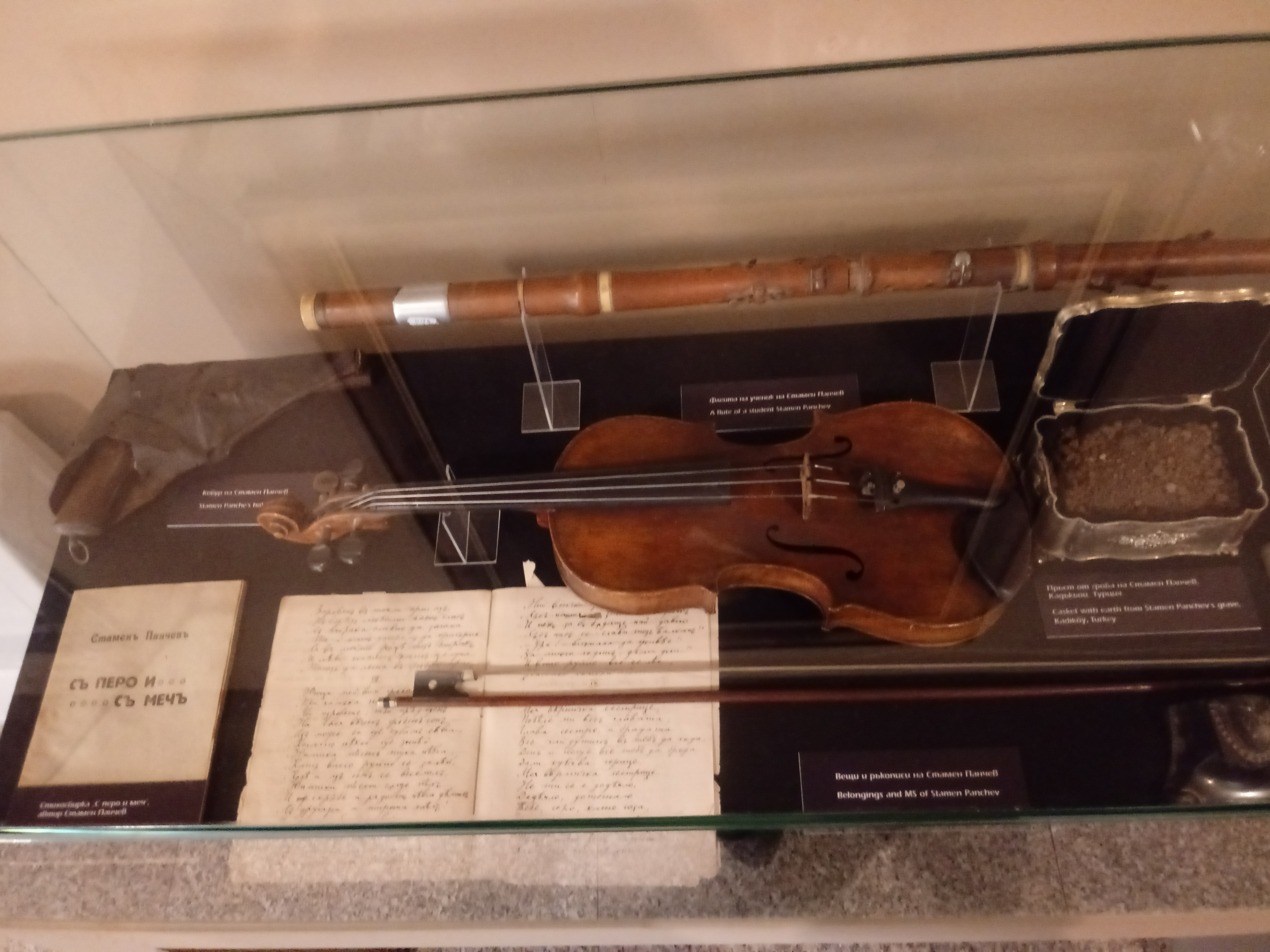
Belongings of the Botevgrad poet Stamen Panchev

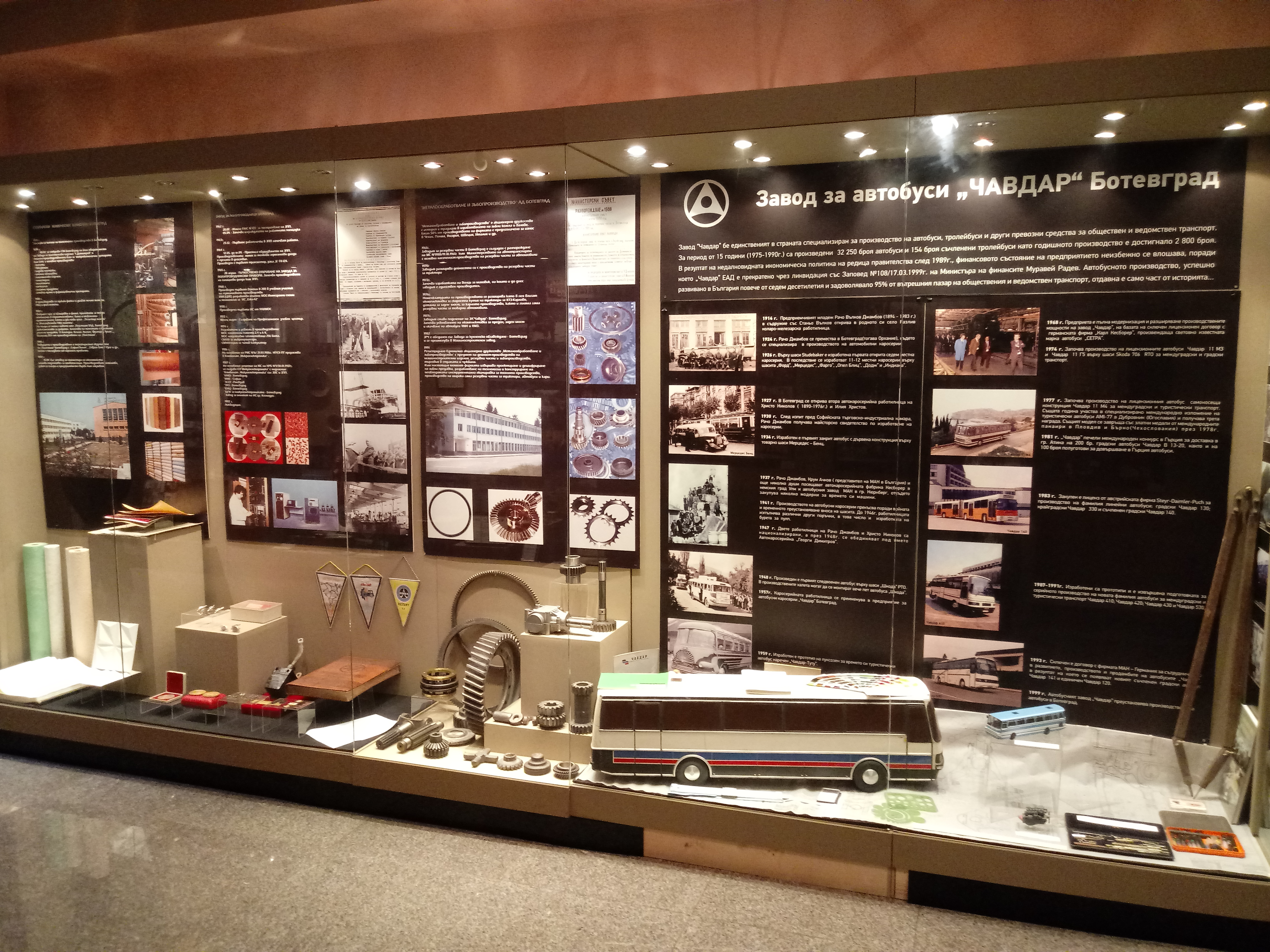
Showcase of the Chavdar Bus factory

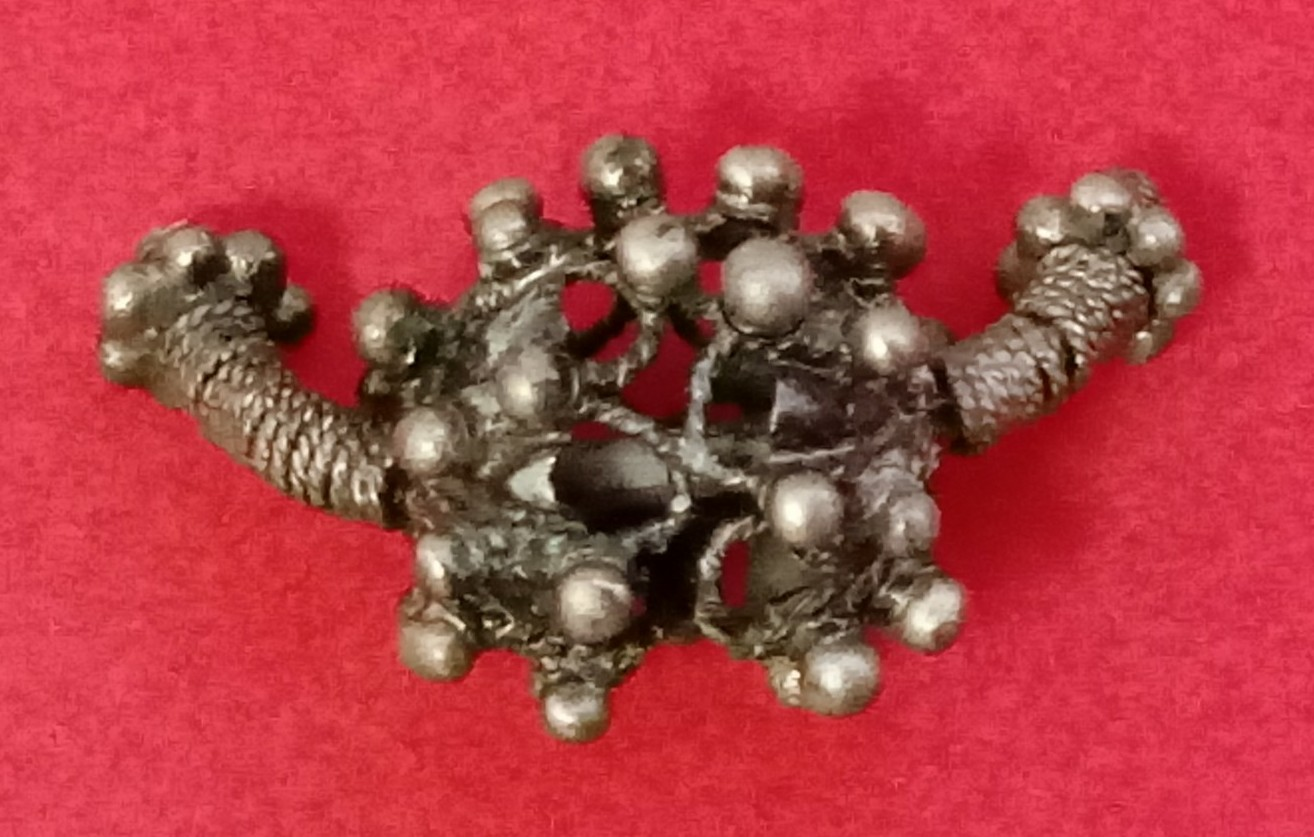
Silver earring from 14 century

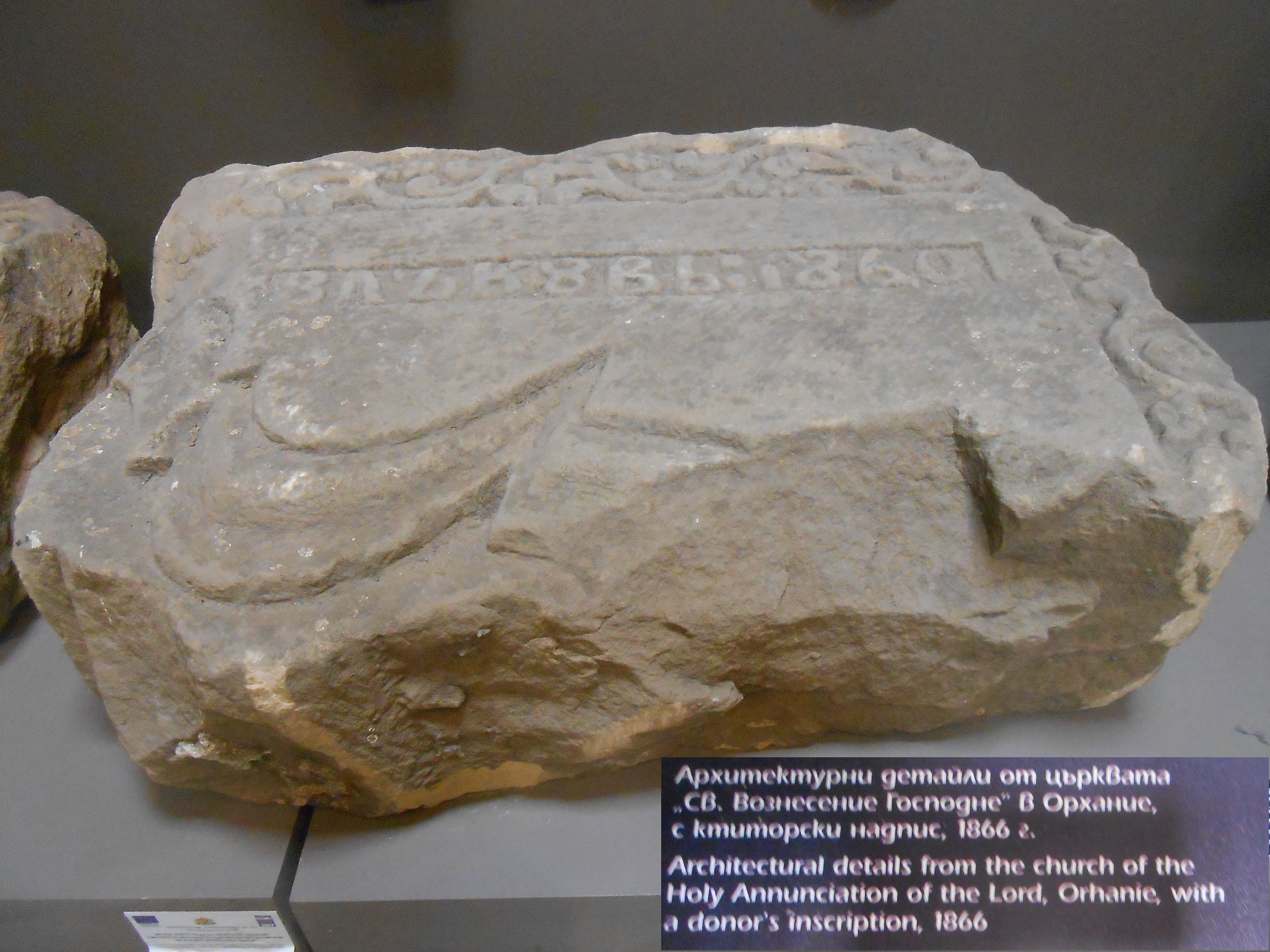
Architectural details from the Holy Annunciation Church in Botevgrad, 1866

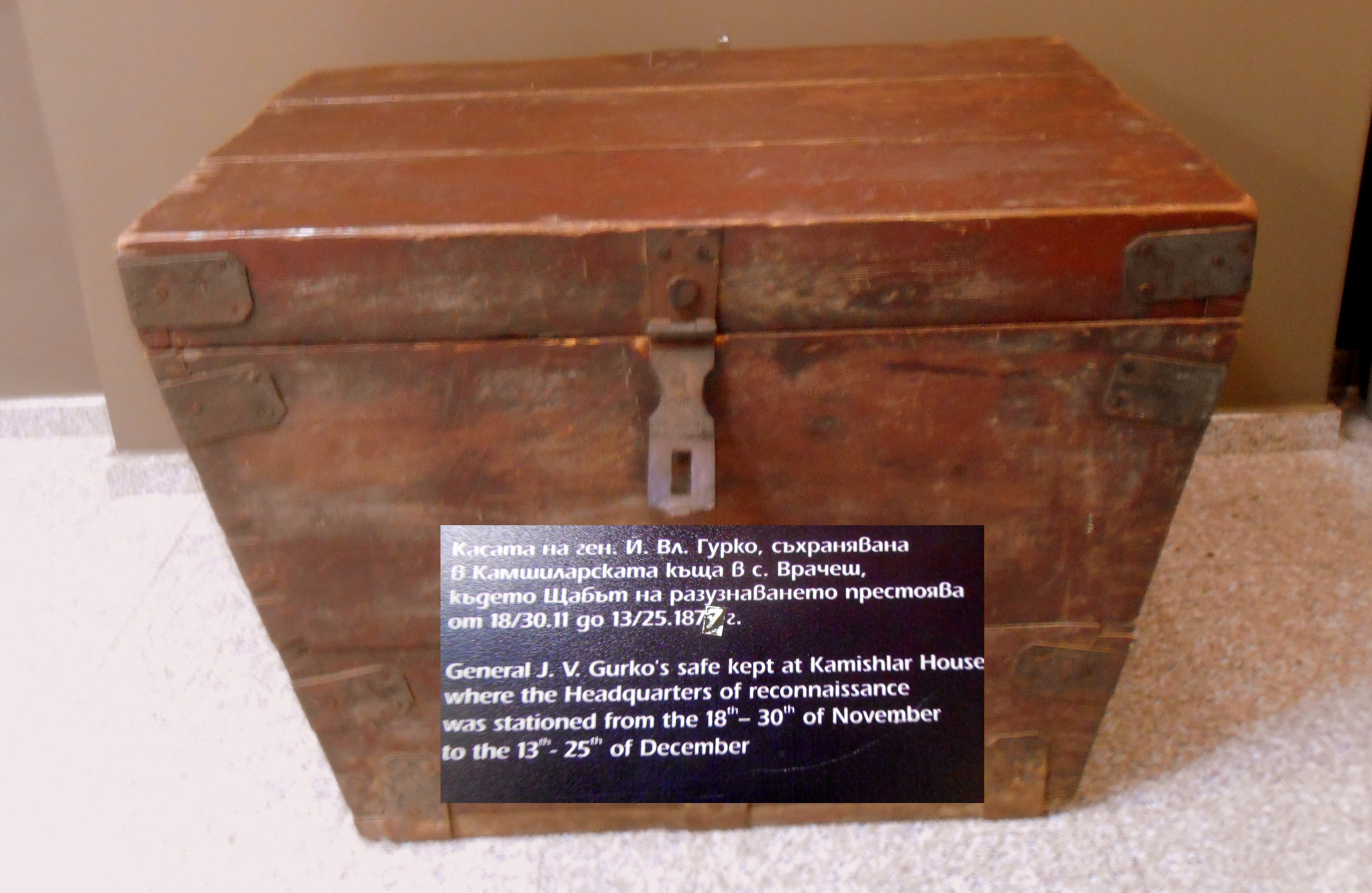
The safe of General Iosif Gurko
