= Trolleybuses in Stara Zagora =

Transit system in Stara Zagora, Bulgaria

Coordinates: 42.40984°N 25.62416°E

Stara Zagora trolleybus system
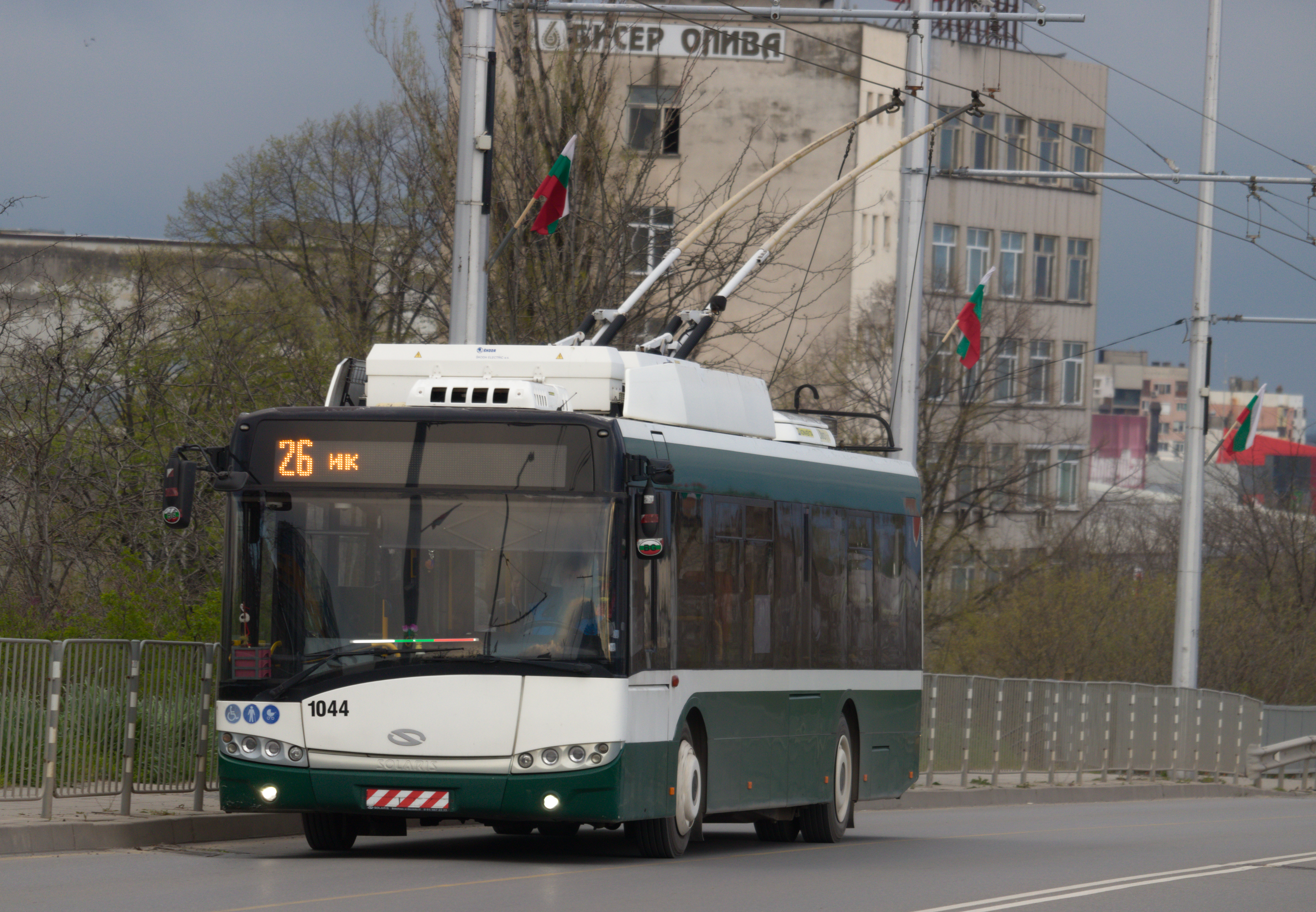
- A Škoda Solaris 26Tr trolleybus in Stara Zagora.

Operation
- Locale: Stara Zagora, Bulgaria
- Open: November 1987
- Status: Open
- Routes: 4
- Operator(s): Trolleybus and Bus Transport Stara Zagora

Infrastructure
- Depot(s): 1
- Stock: 28 trolleybuses

Statistics
- Track length (total): 23.4 km (14.5 mi)
- Route length: 29.5 km (18.3 mi)
- 2011: 2.25 million
Overview
Stara Zagora trolleybus system map, August 2013

The Stara Zagora trolleybus system (Bulgarian: Тролейбусен транспорт Стара Загора) forms part of the public transport network of Stara Zagora, Bulgaria.

Opened in November 1987, it is one of the 10 trolleybus systems currently operating in Bulgaria.

== History ==
The Stara Zagora trolleybus system was constructed in the 1980s as many other trolleybus systems in Bulgaria. The system was designed with two major lines, connecting the north parts of the city with the south, and the east parts - with the west. The two major lines are connected in the city center close to the Alana park.

The first trolleybuses that ran through the streets of Stara Zagora were second-hand Škoda 14Tr trolleybuses that used to serve the Sofia network. In the following years, new ZiU and DAC-Chavdar vehicles were delivered to complete the system fleet. Due to poor reliability the DAC-Chavdar trolleybuses were already withdrawn by the end of the 1990s.

The next delivery of new vehicles occurred 22 years later in 2009, when 6 low-floor trolleybuses were delivered by the Ukrainian Lviv Bus Factory.

In 2014 Stara Zagora received 8 brand new Škoda Solaris 26Tr trolleybuses as part of a joint order with the municipalities of Burgas, Varna and Pleven sponsored by a European Union program. In 2015 14 similar trolleybuses followed, this time from the Solaris Trollino 12 type. The older Škoda and ZiU trolleybuses were scrapped except for one unit of each type which were purchased for preservation in Sofia. The newer LAZ trolleybuses were withdrawn and are stored in the depot awaiting disposition.

== Lines ==
The four lines of the present Stara Zagora trolleybus system are as follows:

| Line | Route | Notes |
|---|---|---|
| 1 | Zheleznik – SBA | Not operating since 23.10.2021 |
| 2 | Beroe Stadium – Mototehnika | |
| 26 | Zheleznik - Mototehnika | operates Mon-Sat only |
| 36 | Zheleznik - Zagorka Brewery | |

== Fleet ==
=== Current fleet ===
As of 2020, the Stara Zagora trolleybus fleet consists of :

| Quantity | Manufacturer | Model No | Entered service | Low-floor |
|---|---|---|---|---|
| 8 | Škoda | 26Tr | 2014 | yes |
| 14 | Solaris | Trollino 12 | 2015 | yes |

=== Former fleet ===
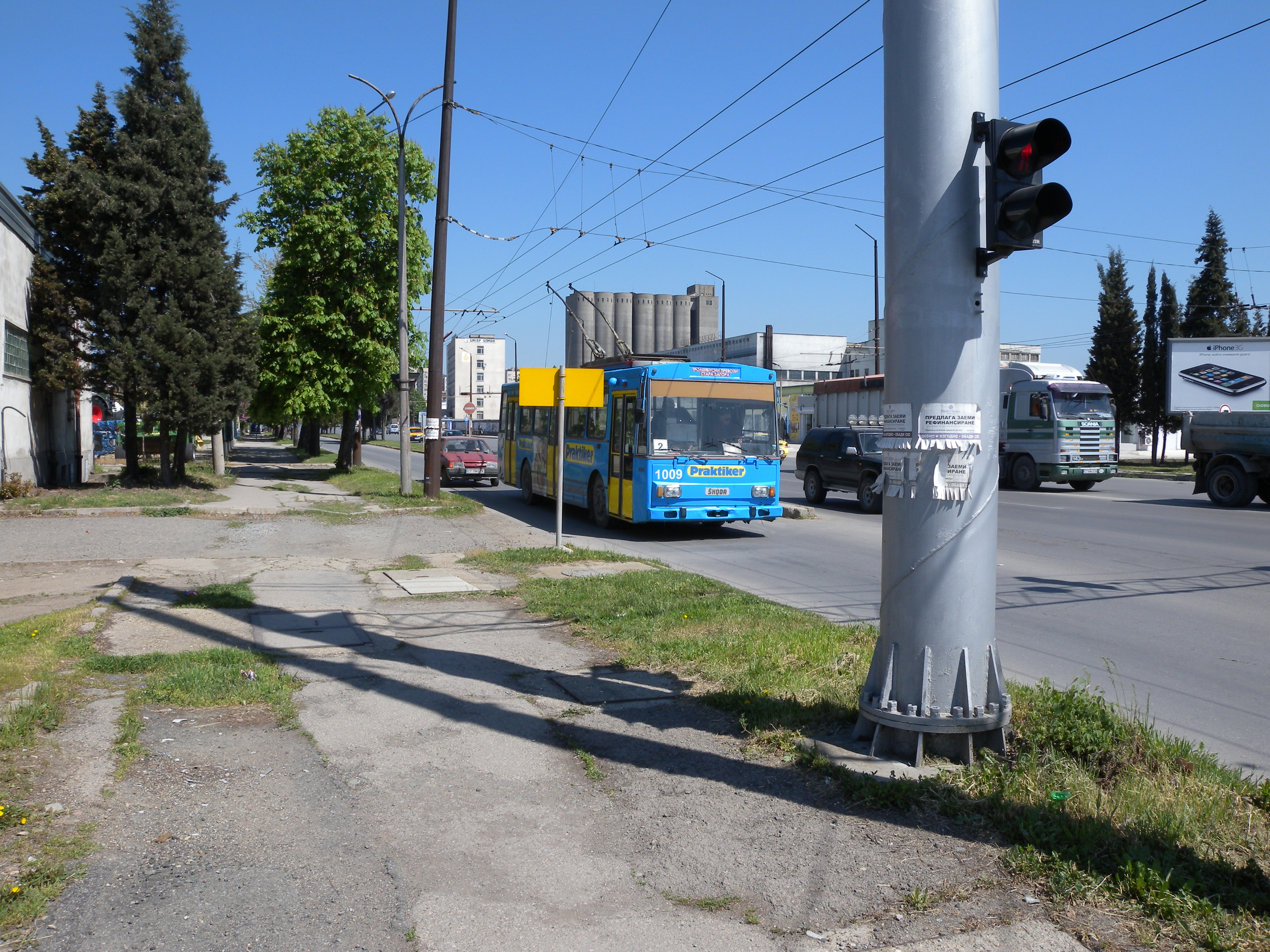
Škoda 14Tr trolleybus

| Quantity | Manufacturer | Model No |
|---|---|---|
| 6 | LAZ | E183 |
| 20 | ZiU | 682 |
| 4 | DAC-Chavdar | 317ETR |
| 10 | Škoda | 14Tr |
