= Trolleybuses in Sofia =

Transit system in Sofia, Bulgaria

Sofia trolleybus system
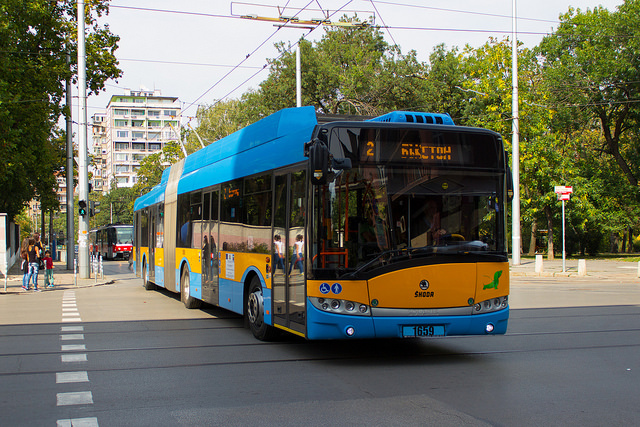
- Škoda 27Tr Solaris trolleybus in Sofia

Operation
- Locale: Sofia, Bulgaria

Infrastructure
- Electrification: 600 V DC
- Depot: 3
- Stock: 141

Statistics
First era: 1941–1944
- Status: Closed
- Routes: 1
Current era: Since 1948
- Status: Open
- Routes: 10
- Track length (total): 257 km (160 mi)
- Route length: 193 km (120 mi)
- Website: [elektrotransportsf.com]

The Sofia trolleybus system (Bulgarian: Тролейбусен транспорт София) forms part of the public transport network of Sofia, the capital city of Bulgaria. Trolleybuses first began serving Sofia on 8 February 1941, on a route to the suburb of Gorna Banya, but that initial system closed on 9 September 1944. The current system opened only four years later, on 1 May 1948.

The system presently comprises ten routes with 257 km (160 mi) network build, of which 193 km (120 mi) are currently in use.

As of 2020, the average speed of the trolleybus system in Sofia is 15.7 km/h.

== History ==
Trolleybus transport was the last form of surface public transport to develop in Sofia, after buses and trams. The first Sofia trolleybus line opened on 8 February 1941, in what was then the Kingdom of Bulgaria. It was more than 3 km (2 mi) long, and connected the city with the Gorna Banya quarter. The line was covered by 2 MAN trolleybuses, which were stored on the last stops during the night, due to the lack of depot. It closed on 9 September 1944.

The city's second trolleybus system, the first part of the current system, opened on 1 May 1948, by which time the country had become the People's Republic of Bulgaria. In the 1950s and 1960s, massive development of the trolleybus transport in Sofia began. At that time, the construction of new trolleybus routes proceeded especially rapidly, and two depots ("Stochna Gara" and "Nadezhda") were opened, with a total capacity of 160 trolleybuses. In 1951, the first Bulgarian made trolleybuses entered service.

In 1987, a new depot, "Iskar", was opened with a capacity of 130 trolleybuses. Levski depot was opened in 1994 with capacity of 60 trolleybuses. As of 2021 three depots are in operation: Nadezhda, Iskar and Levski. The latter also serves as a storage and overhaul facility.

== Lines ==
As of October 2025, the following trolleybus lines in Sofia are in service:

Line	Route	Depot
1	Levski G Residential District – Fifth City Hospital	Levski
2	Hadzhi Dimitar Residential District – Buxton Residential District	Iskar
3	Levski G Residential District – St. Anna Hospital	Iskar
4	Druzhba 2 Residential District – Hadzhi Dimitar Residential District	Iskar
5	St. Anna Hospital – Nadezhda Overpass	Iskar
6	Lyulin 3 Residential District – Lozenets District	Nadezhda
7	Lyulin 3 Residential District – Gotse Delchev Residential District	Nadezhda
8	Stochna gara Square – Gotse Delchev Residential District	Iskar
9	Borovo Residential District – Stochna gara Square	Nadezhda
11	Druzhba 1 Residential District – Stochna gara Square	Iskar

== Fleet ==
=== Current fleet ===
As of January 2026, the Sofia trolleybus fleet consisted of 139 trolleybuses, of which around 115 are operational.

The following models are currently part of the fleet:

Quantity	In service	Model	Year built	Fleet numbers	Notes
50	50	Škoda 27Tr Solaris III	2013–2014	1650–1674, 2675–2699	Equipped with auxiliary diesel engine
30	30	Škoda 27Tr Solaris IV	2020–2021	2801–2830	Equipped with 30 kWh LTO battery
30	30	Škoda 26Tr Solaris III	2010	1603–1632	Equipped with auxiliary diesel engine
15	5	Ikarus 280.92	1985–1988	2054, 2115, 2117, 2123, 2614, **2623**, **2702**, **2703**, 2711, 2712, 2715, 2723, **2913**, **2915**, 2922	Ganz electrical equipment. Total of 151 units delivered. Operational units shown in bold. 2623 is heritage vehicle and 2702 is driving school vehicle.
10	0	Ikarus 280.92F	1985–1988	2104–2109, 2608–2609, 2902–2903	Facelift, modernized 2008–2015
3	0	Cobra GD 272	2003–2005	2002–2004	Güleryüz bodywork, ICPE SAERP (Romania) electrical equipment, assembled by Tramkar
1	0	Gräf & Stift GЕ 152 M18	1988	1801 (ex-1806)	The last remaining unit of eight vehicles acquired secondhand from the Innsbruck trolleybus system in 2006, which were numbered 1801–1808 in Sofia (and had been nos. 807, 801, 815, 814, 805, 816, 802, and 810 in Innsbruck).

=== Heritage fleet ===
The heritage fleet consists of the following vehicles:

Model	Fleet number	Year built	Status	Notes
Škoda 9TrHT28	5027	1981	Not operational	Ex-Plovdiv. In private ownership.
Škoda 14Tr06	1002	1985	Not operational	Ex-Stara Zagora, née Sofia
DAC-Chavdar 317 Etr	118	1986	Not operational	Ex-Pernik. In private ownership.
ZiU-682	1028	1987	Operational	Ex-Stara Zagora
Ikarus 280.92	2623	1988	Operational	

=== Past fleet ===
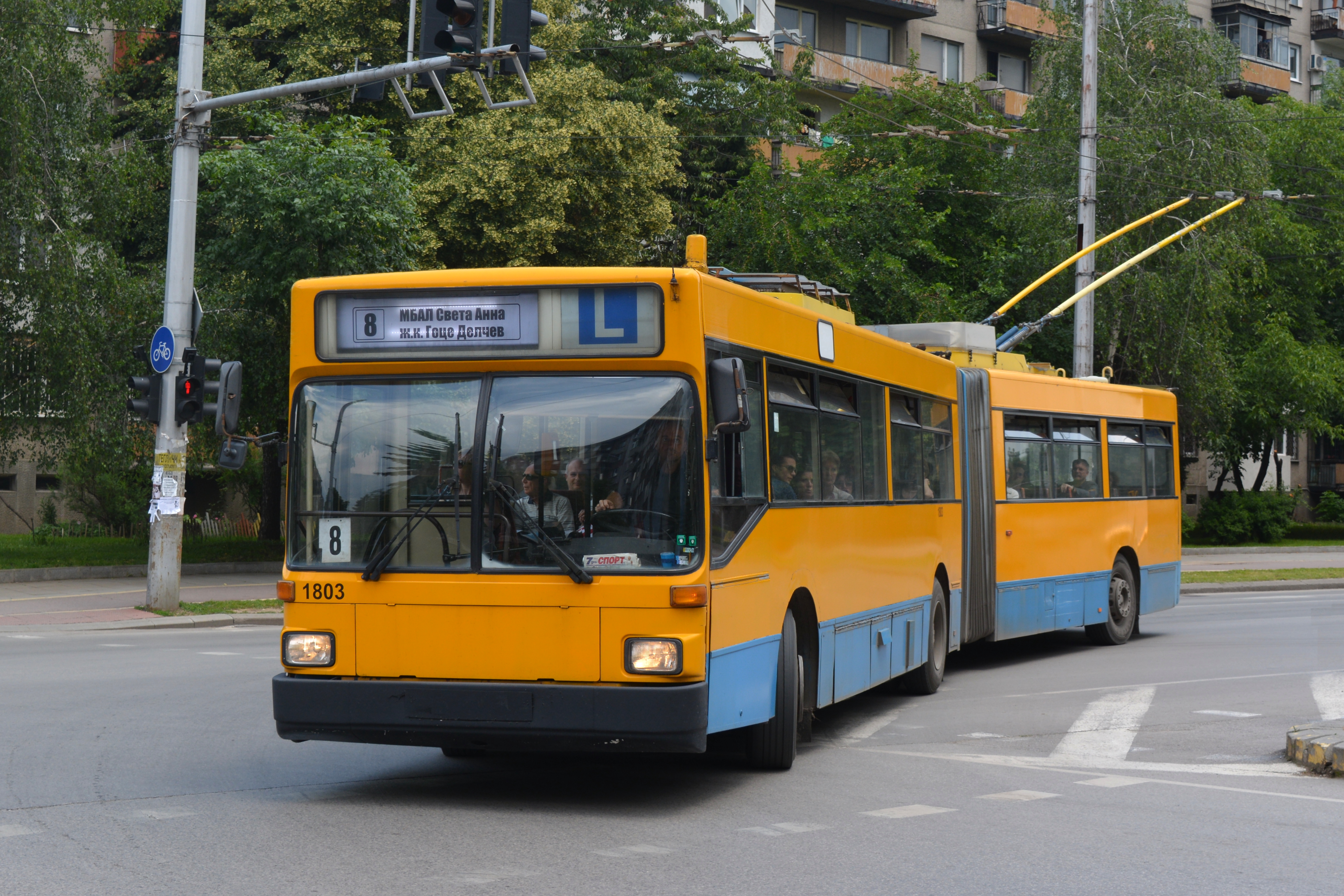
Trolleybus 1803, ex-Innsbruck 815, built in 1988 by Gräf & Stift

Quantity	Model	Years in service	Notes
2	MAN MPE I	1941–1956	Schumann body, BBC electrical equipment
26	MTB-82	1948–1960s	
67	TB-51	1951–1971	Bulgarian-made version of the Soviet MTB-82
244	Skoda 9Tr	1964–1990	
12	MAN/Kässbohrer/Kiepe 610 FEC 1	1967–1974	ex-Dortmund, built in 1958
3	Ikarus 280T	1980–1984	Rebuilt from diesel buses with Skoda 9Tr electrical equipment
19	Gräf & Stift GEO I, GEO II, GE 120	1984–1987	Nos. 201–219, ex-Linz (where they were numbered in the range 51–77), which were built between 1960 and 1968
20	Skoda 14Tr06	1985–1987	Transferred to other Bulgarian towns
70	ZiU-682	1986–2004	
23	DAC-Chavdar 317 Etr	1987–1994	
1	Tramkar-Chavdar 130	1994–2010	Prototype
8	Gräf & Stift GE152 M18	2006–2018	ex-Innsbruck, built in 1988

== Depots ==
- Nadezhda - opened in 1962, located on podpolkovnik Kalitin street, operates lines 6, 7 and 9; houses trolleybuses with fleet numbers 2xxx
- Iskar - opened in 1987, located on Amsterdam street, operates lines 2, 3, 4, 5, 8 and 11; houses trolleybuses with fleet numbers 1xxx
- Levski - opened in 1994, located on Bessarabia street, serves as maintenance and overhaul facility and for storage and dismantling of decommissioned vehicles. Since November 2021 also operates line 1. Fleet numbering common with Nadezhda depot.

== See also ==
- Sofia Metro
- Sofia Public Transport
- Sofia Tramway
- List of trolleybus systems
