= Chavdar Voyvoda =

Who doesn't know Chavdar Voyvoda,
who has not heard of him?
…
And he was a fearsome hajduk
for wealthy people and Turks;
but for the miserable poor people
Chavdar Voyvoda was a protection!

— Hristo Botev, Hajduks, 1871

Chavdar (Bulgarian: Чавдар) was a 16th-century semi-legendary Bulgarian hajduk voivode, a leader of a band of outlaws and a protector of the people against Ottoman injustice. Hajduks would usually take to the woods and wage guerrilla warfare on the ruling Turks. Chavdar was born in south Macedonia and headed a band of 300 people. He was initially active in the Štip and Kozjak regions, but subsequently moved to the region of Sofia. According to the legend, he was captured by the pasha of Sofia by trickery, but rescued by his nephew and standard-bearer Lalush Voyvoda who devastated the pasha's estates. It is thought that Chavdar may have been one of the hajduks who assaulted Sofia in February 1595.

== Legacy ==
One of the greatest hajduk figures in Bulgarian folklore and epic tales, Chavdar was immortalised by national poet Hristo Botev. One of Botev's masterpieces, Hajduks, is about Chavdar, as are a large number of folk songs. A Bulgarian coach company carries the name of this character.

Chavdar Peninsula in Graham Land on the Antarctic Peninsula, Antarctica is named after Chavdar.
