= Monastery School, Bozhenitsa =

Coordinates: 43°0′42″N 23°49′15″E

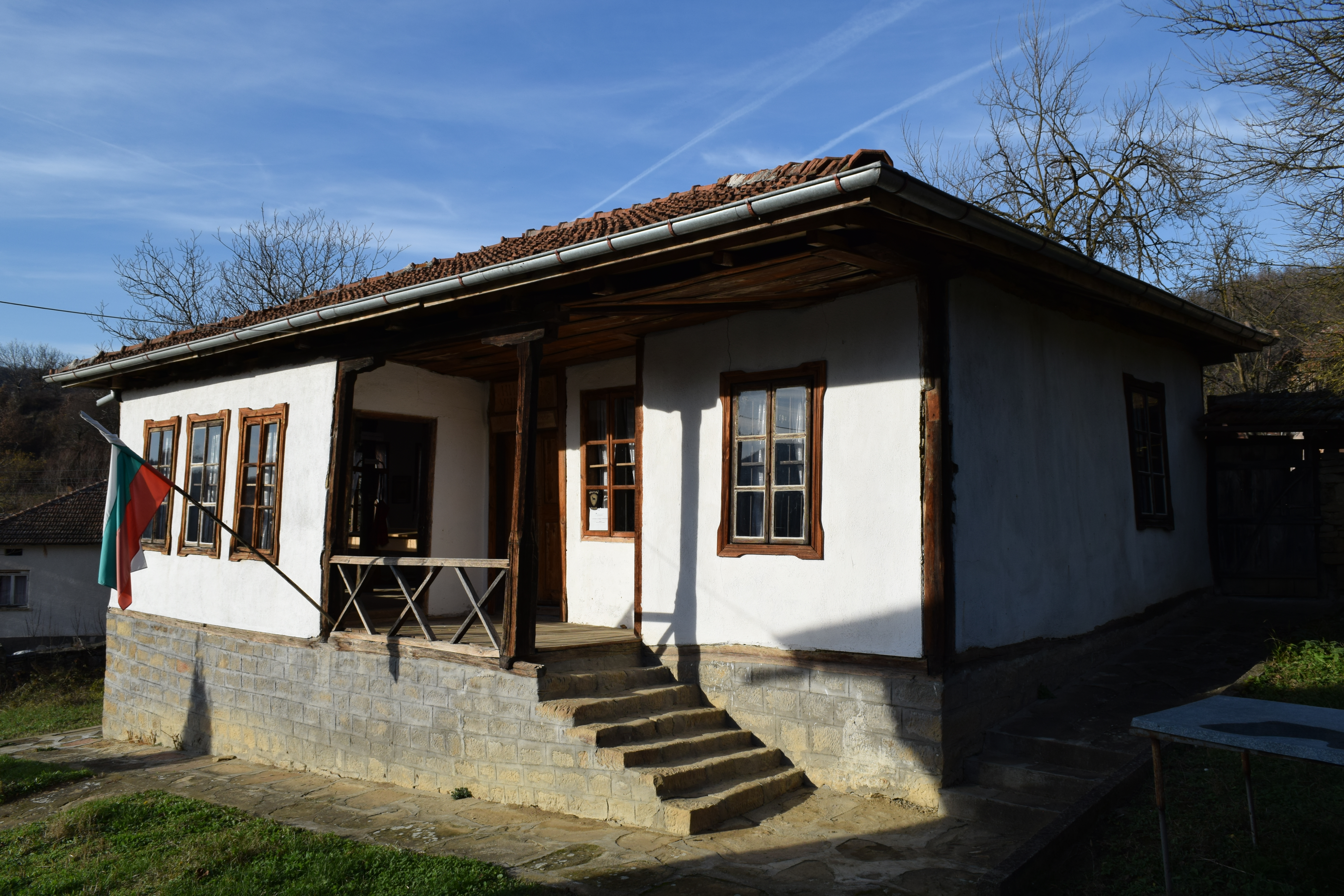
The Monastery school

The Monastery school in the village of Bozhenitsa, western Bulgaria is a former school and now a museum, it is the oldest preserved school building in Botevgrad municipality.

== History ==
According to marginal notes in church books, there had been teachers in Bozhenitsa long before the construction of the school. Regular education in the school and its first edifice date from 1806 during the Bulgarian National Revival. The first teacher was Stoyan Knezovsky. In 1835 a new school was constructed near the Church of Saint Paraskeva. Most of the teachers came from Bozhenitsa and the surrounding villages. The payment of the teachers was low and they received a certain amount of food from the students. About 80 to 100 children studied in the school, some of them coming from the surrounding villages. Initially, only theological subjects were taught, such as the Book of hours, the Psalms and the Gospels, and later writing and mathematics were added. There were no formal classes. The teacher would teach each student separately; Saturday was a day for revision. The classes continued for 2 to 3 hours. The students had a lunch break that lasted 1 to 2 hours. The discipline was strict, supported both by the teacher and the students. The punishments were: standing straight, kneeling, beating with a stick on the arms. Cleaning was done by the students. The school burnt down in 1855. The current edifice was constructed in 1880. The school remained functional until 1943.

In 2006, with contribution by the inhabitants of Bozhenitsa and funds from Botevgrad municipality, the school was restored. It now houses a museum collection and is a branch of the Historical Museum of Botevgrad.

== Gallery ==
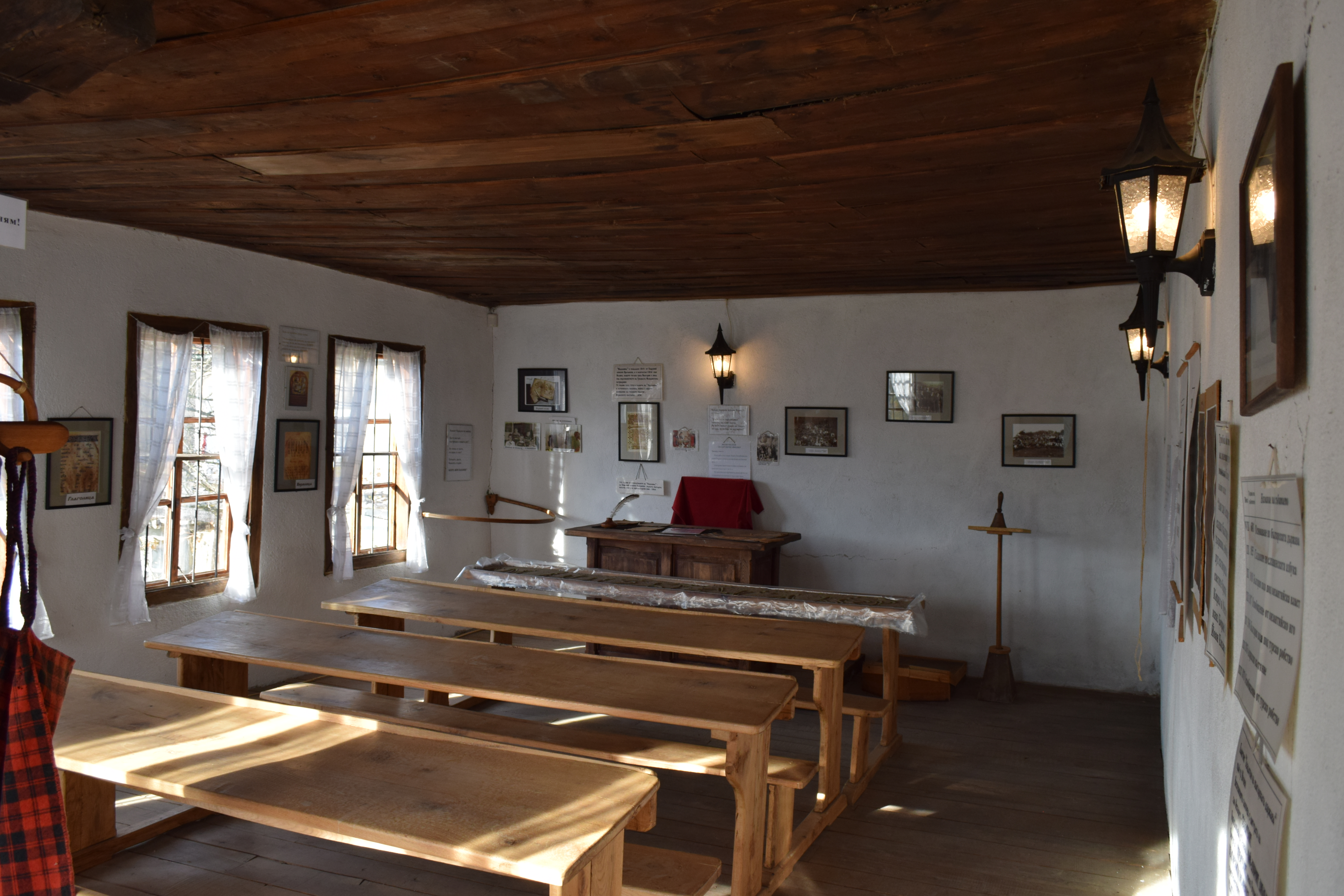

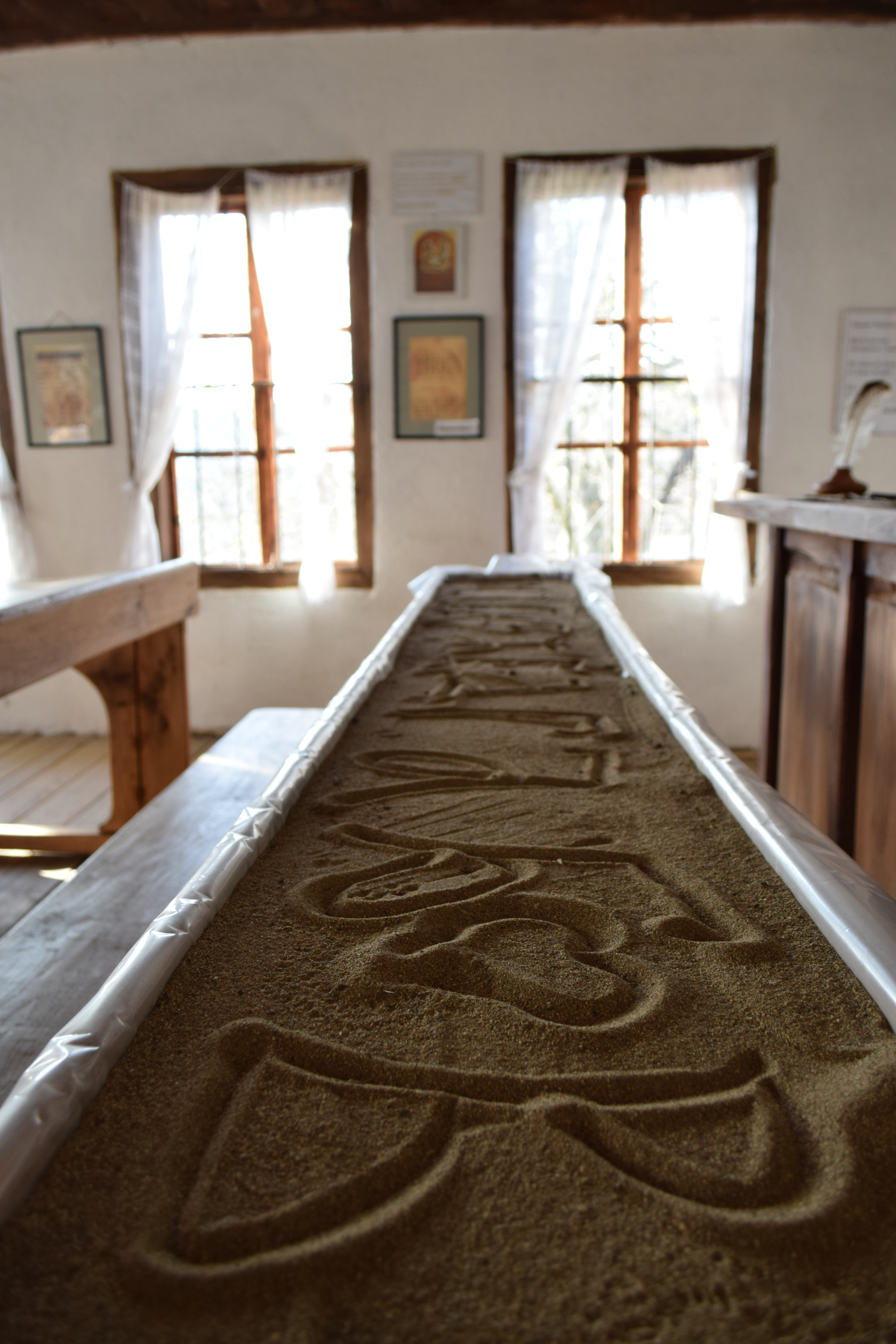

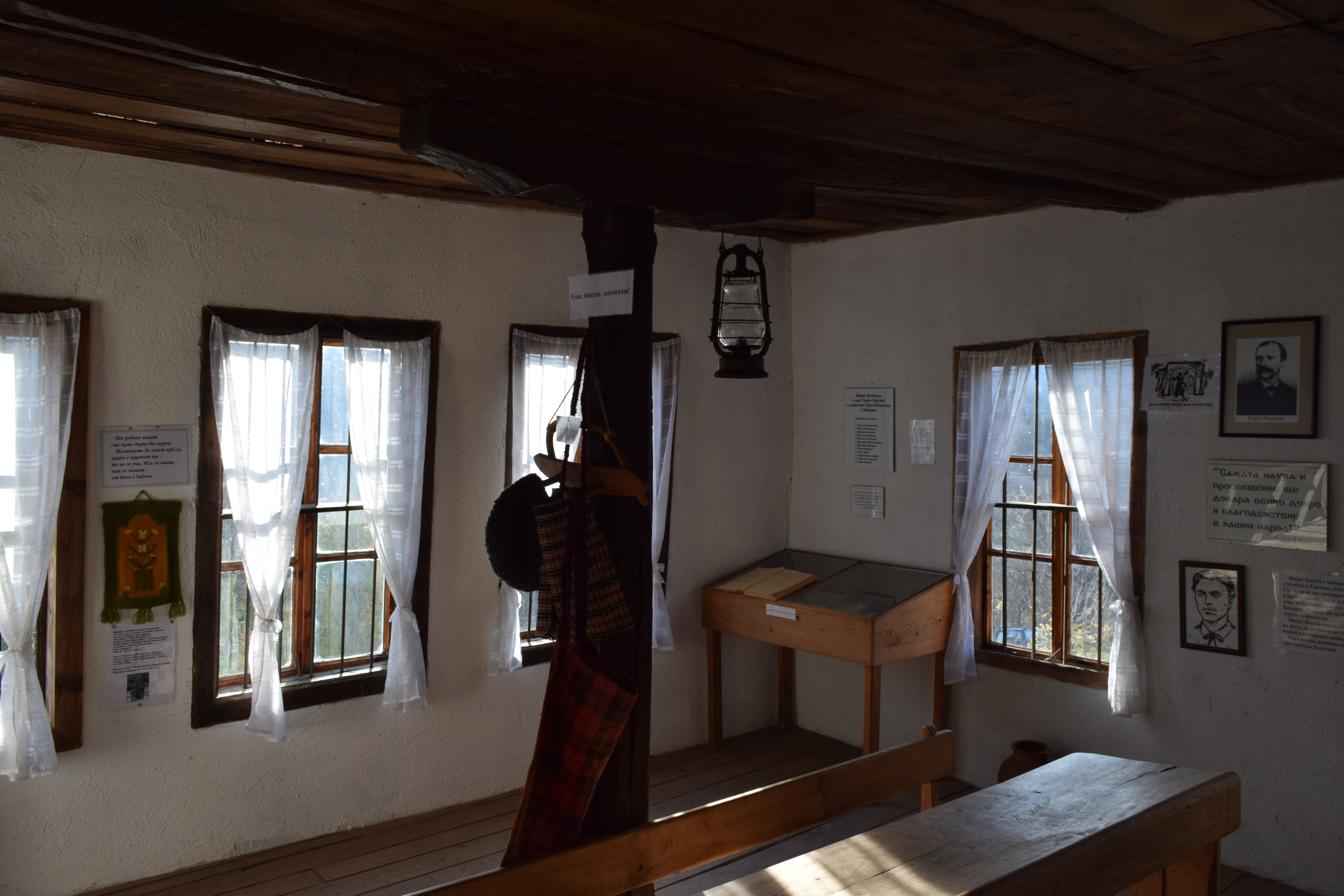

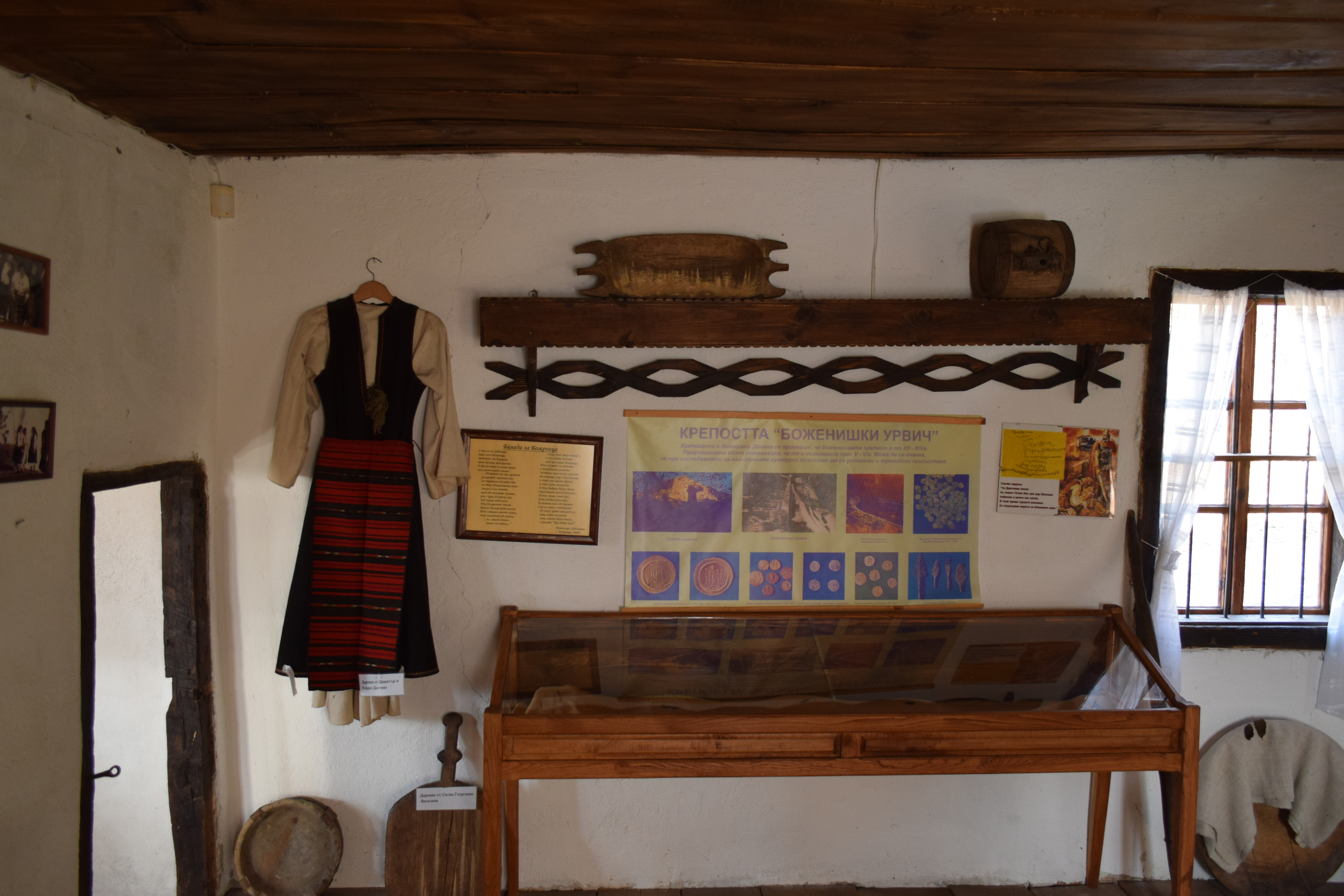

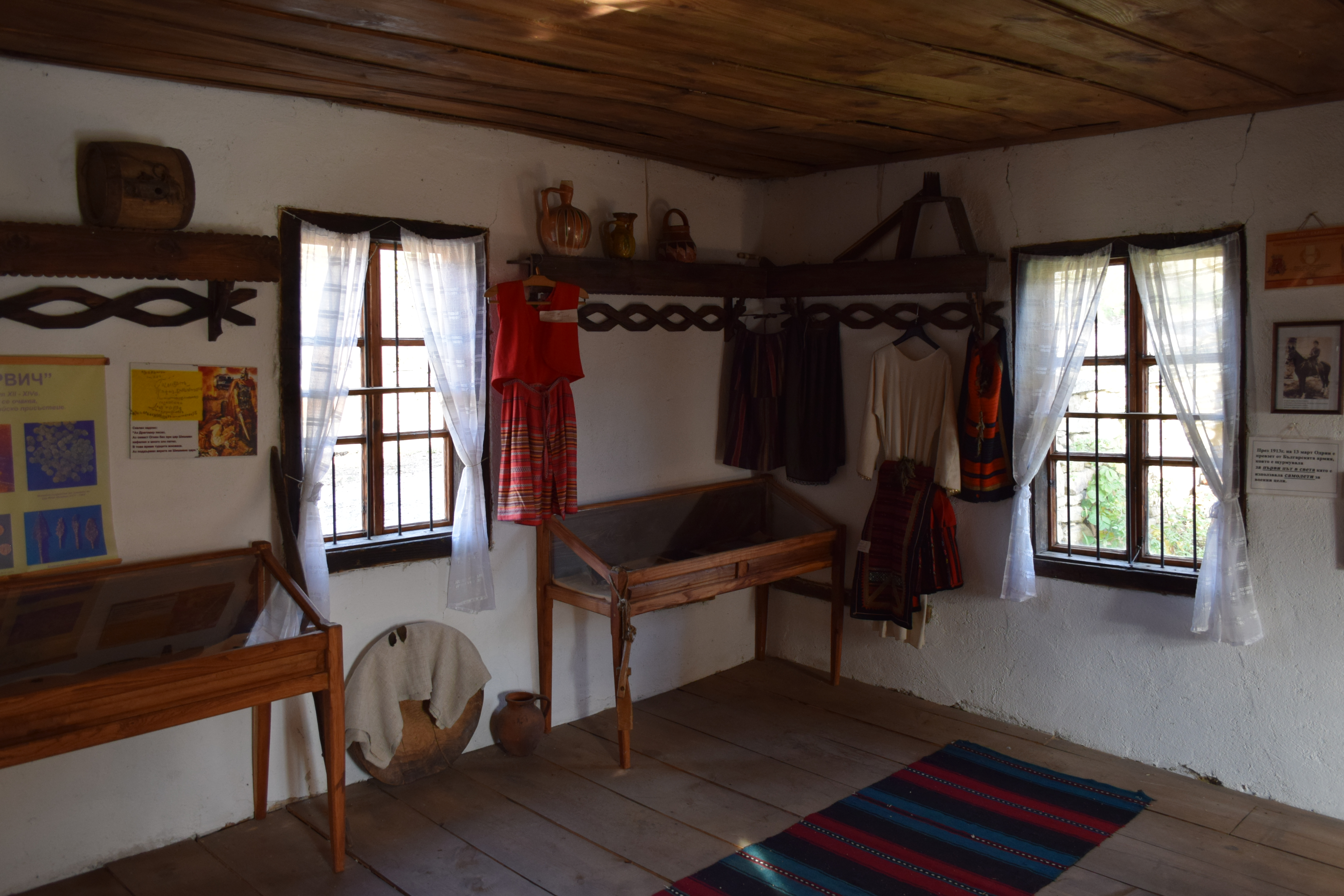
