= Chitalishte Hristo Botev 1884, Botevgrad =

Cultural center in Sofia, Bulgaria

Chitalishte "Hristo Botev 1884" (Bulgarian: Читалище "Христо Ботев 1884") is a chitalishte, or cultural center, situated in the town of Botevgrad, western Bulgaria. It was founded in 1884 by a group of local teachers under the name Chitalishte “Progress". Among them were Dimitar Tsokov, Nikola Cholakov, Georgi Petrov. They distributed books, newspapers and magazines, organized readings and lectures.

== History ==
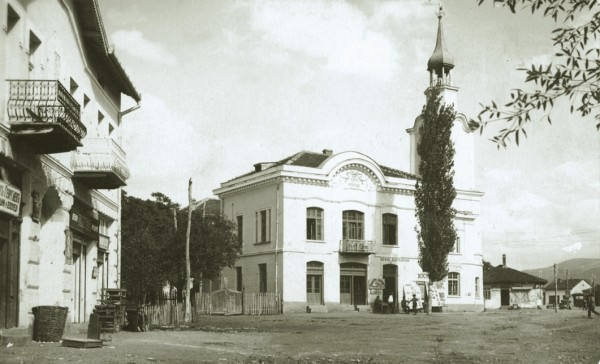
Chitalishte "Hristo Botev 1884" in the past

Though founded in 1884, four years later its activities were discontinued for a short time. Its activities as a cultural center were restored in 1891 by young graduates from the newly established Sofia University, among them Petar Ilchev, Petar Tsenov, Dimitar Todorovski, Iliya Benchev, Hristo Yotov. That same year, the Amateur Theater began to function.

Several years later, a group of young people created an educational society called "Awakening", which opened a new chitalishte. They arranged dinners, lectures, shows in the local school where they adapted a theatrical salon and a stage. A mixed and a church choir and an orchestra were established at this chitalishte. In 1904, when the notable Bulgarian poet Stamen Panchev returned to the town, its members reached up to 180 people. In 1906, "Awakening" stopped functioning, sold his property and established a fund for the construction of a building for the chitalishte. The idea was realized years later. A meeting of a group of citizens and teachers was organized on 21 February 1921, and a committee was commissioned to construct the edifice. The municipality granted the construction site free of charge near the Botevgrad Clock Tower and took a loan of BGN 400,000 to fund the building. Construction commenced on 9 October 1921, and about two years later the building was finalized with the voluntary work of town residents.

On 3 February 1924 the new edifice was officially inaugurated. The new cultural and educational center was established, a new statute was adopted and Board of Trustees was elected. The new chitalishte was named after the great Bulgarian poet and revolutionary Hristo Botev (1848-1876). It quickly became the center of a diverse cultural activity. Local and guest lecturers, such as Asen Zlatarov presented various lectures, reports and papers. In 1926 a cinema machine was purchased and installed. Renown opera singers and composers, such as Christina Morfova, Anya Prokopova, Alexander Raichev performed at the chitalishte.

The cultural center had its own orchestra. In 1934, a "people's university" was opened and lectures were held twice a week. The number of the cultural center members increased steadily. A 1947 report indicated that its members were 705, of whom 476 were men and 229 were women. In the late 1960s, the old building was demolished. The new building was officially inaugurated on 27 September 1973. In 1981 the library was moved to a specially constructed edifice. The library at Chitalishte "Hristo Botev 1884" owns 83,341 volumes of books, periodicals, audiovisual documents, notes and cartographic publications, etc.

== Activity ==
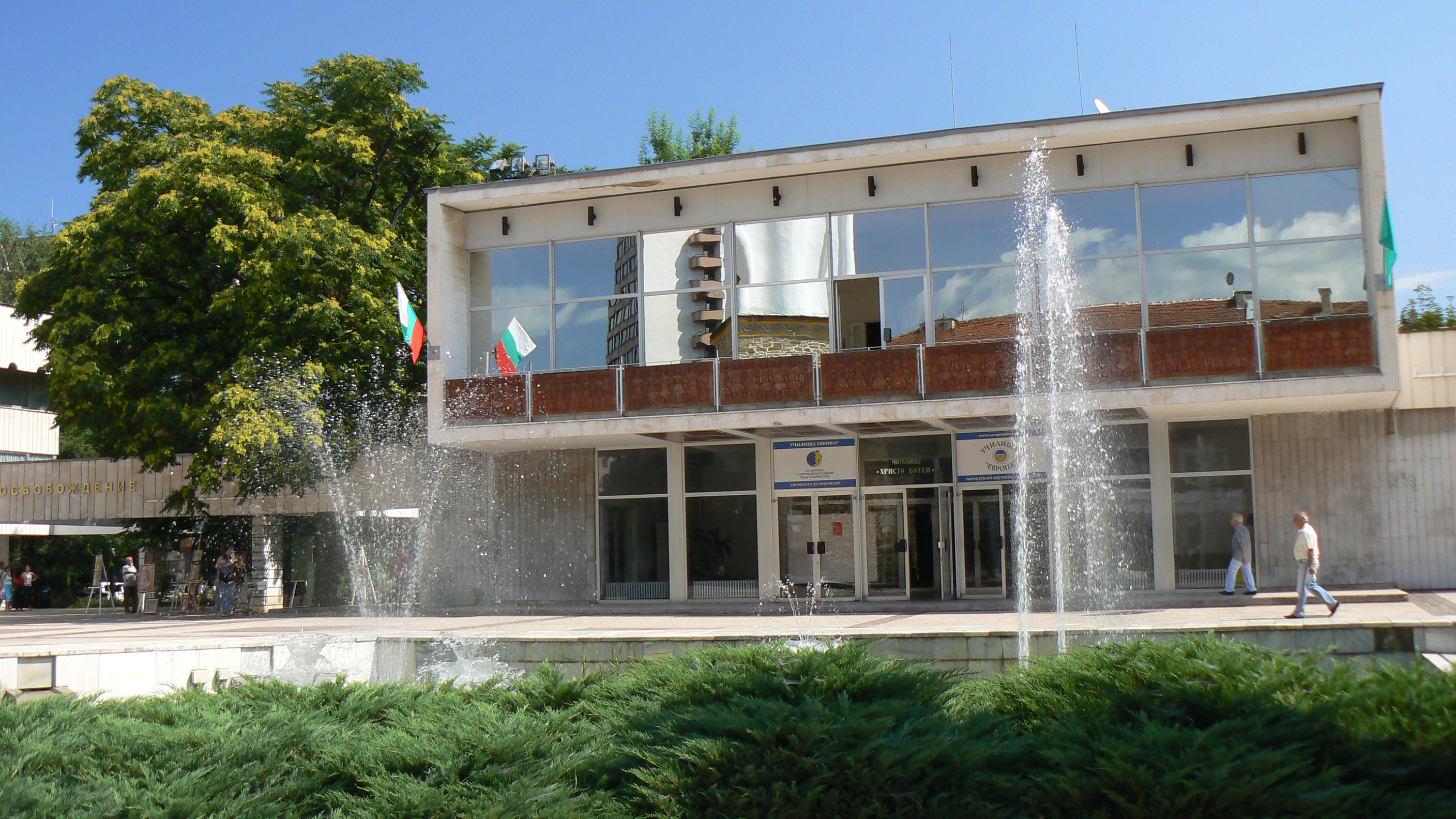
Chitalishte "Hristo Botev 1884", Botevgrad

Chitalishte Hristo Botev 1884 is an established and authoritative public institution with a leading place in the cultural life of Botevgrad Municipality. A wide range of cultural, educational, information and leisure activities attract the inhabitants, regardless of their age and social status. The festivals and the events organized by the chitalishte are widely known and highly appreciated by the citizens. There are dance folk ensembles, dance groups of different genres, singing groups, theater and majorettes formations with more than 550 participants in various forms organized in 16 teams. Many of them participate in many international festivals, national events, national television programmes and concerts. The cultural activities cover almost all genres.

The cultural center organizes most of the festivals in the town and the municipality, mainly with the participation of the local amateur groups, as well as with visiting professional groups. These include Christmas and Easter festivals, Children's Book Week, the Month of Culture, celebrations of the National Holiday and the Day of Botevgrad, anniversary celebrations. Chitalishte Hristo Botev 1884 organizes visits of many theaters from different parts of the country, concerts of classical and popular music, folk ensembles and others.

The Mixed Urban Choir was established in 1912 by the poet and patriot Stamen Panchev bears his name. Over the years distinguished conductors such as Gr. Sokolov, Iv. Dimitrov, Topalov, Antoniy Zhivkov, Petar Petrov, Ivan Neshkov have worked with the choir. In the last ten years the conductor is Tatyana Tsonkova. The choir is a laureate of republican festivals of amateur art and has won gold medals. In 2002, on the occasion of its 90th anniversary and under the leadership of Valentin Ganchev, the Mixed Urban Choir "Stamen Panchev" was awarded the Botevgrad Medal of Honour.

The Children's Choir was established in 1977 by Bonka Golemanova. It has won many competitions in the country and abroad. Its repertoire is varied - from classical choral samples to modern works of Bulgarian folklore and choir songs by the most famous contemporary composers. The current conductor of the choir is Boryana Neshkova, the co-rehearser is Silvia Mladenska; both were among its first members.

The Folk Dance Ensemble Botevgrad was founded in 1963 at the Trade Union House of Culture. Its beginning, creative development and activity are related to Vasil Terziyski. The ensemble has achieved great success and has won numerous awards. With its high performance level and rich repertoire of more than 25 productions, Folk Dance Ensemble Botevgrad has performed successfully in the country and abroad.

The creative activity of the other folklore ensemble for songs and dances "Botevgradska mladost", with artistic director Vesela Bozhkova, is also fruitful. The ensemble has participated in numerous concert programmes and international festivals in Bulgaria and abroad, where it has won a number of awards.

The Amateur Theater is also distinguished. In its long history the theater has made dozens of plays by Bulgarian and foreign authors. The theater has been largely successful both in the city and nationwide. The professional directors and actors Georgi Assenov, Petar Alexandrov, Vasil Mirchovski and Veselin Valkov create their own productions.

The Youth Brass Band, conducted by Konstantin Gaydarski, has a well-deserved place in the activity of the cultural center. The band has won awards at prestigious festivals in France and Spain. Together with the majorette groups, it participates at festivals in different European countries every year. The majorette groups and their choreographer and leader Ivanka Hristova are among the most sought-after ensembles in the country.
