= Botevgrad Clock Tower =

Clock Tower, Botevgrad
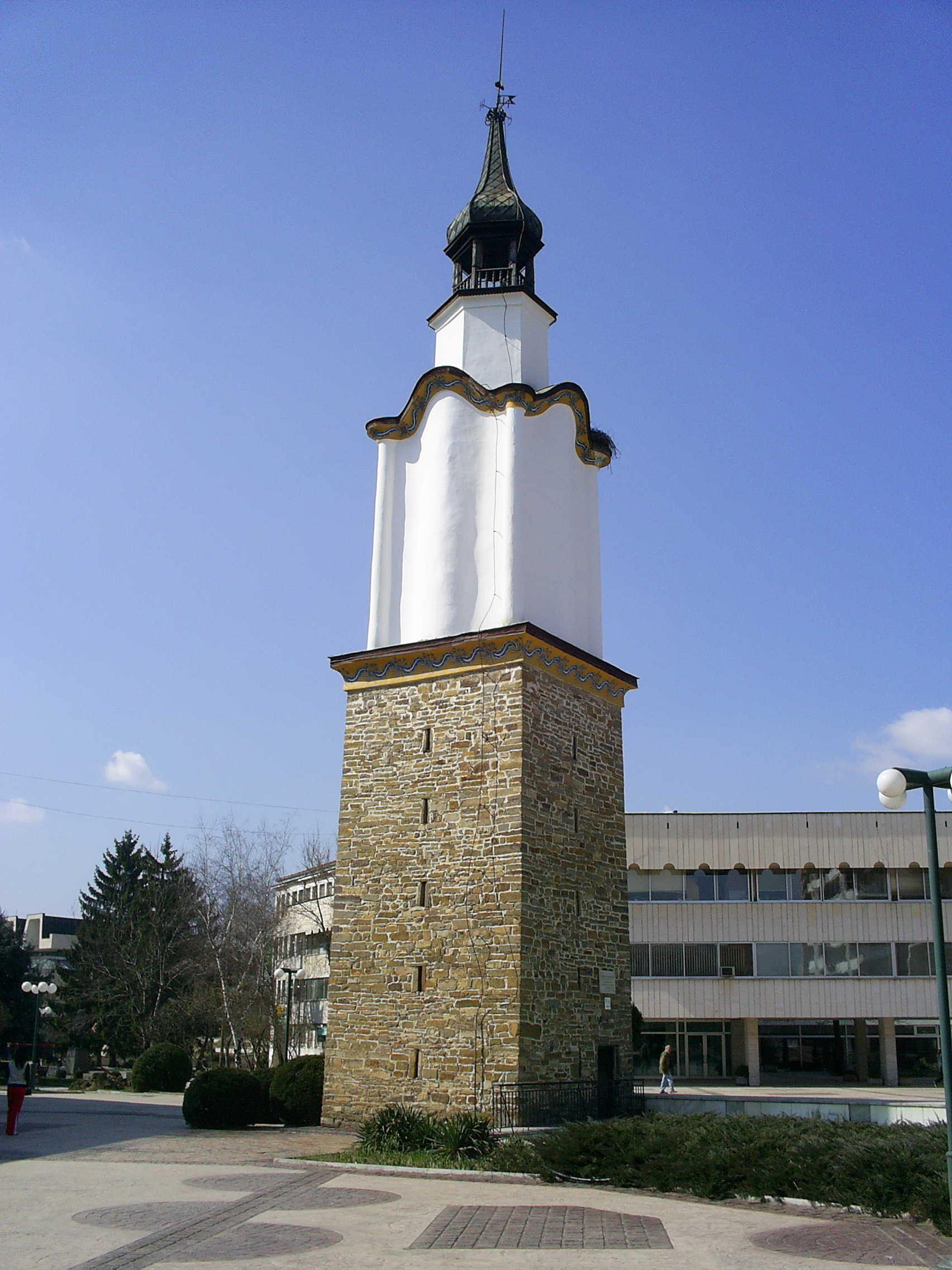
- The Clock Tower in Botevgrad

- Location within Bulgaria

General information
- Type: Clock tower
- Location: Botevgrad, Bulgaria
- Coordinates: 42.906944°N 23.791944°E
- Completed: 1866

Height
- Height: 30 metres (98 ft)

Design and construction
- Architect: Vuno Markov

The Clock tower of Botevgrad (Bulgarian: Часовниковата кула в Ботевград) is the symbol of the town and a part of 100 Tourist Sites of Bulgaria. Its clock mechanism still rings every hour with a respective number of bell rings based on the current hour. It was constructed in 1866.

== History ==
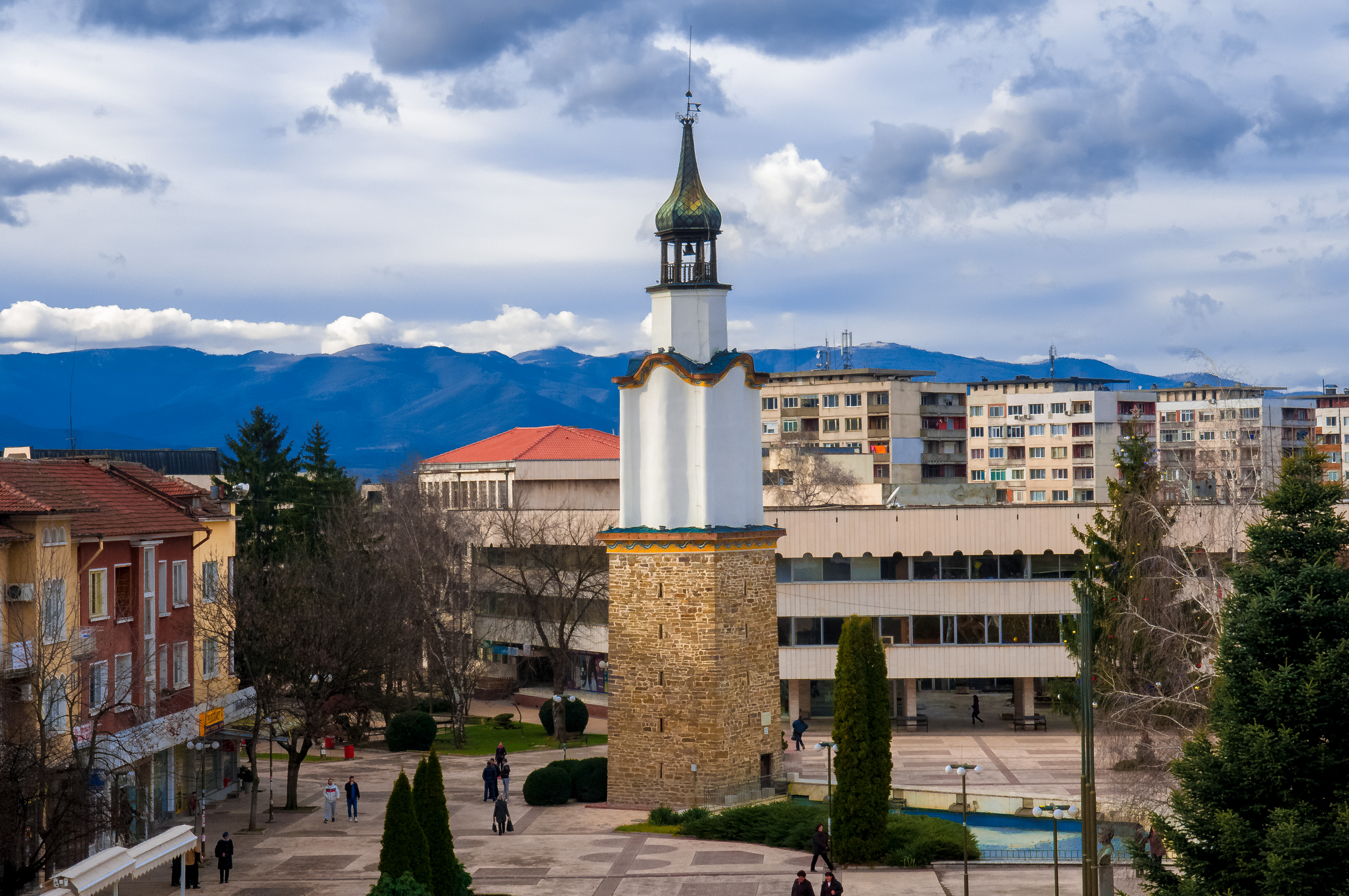
A view of the clock tower

The clock tower was built while Bulgaria was still under Ottoman rule by the master Vuno Markov from Vrachesh as a part of large-scale construction in 1866 on the occasion of the announcement of the village Samundjievo as town and district center by proposal of Midhat Pasha. The clock mechanism was made by the local ironmonger Gencho Nakov, and the bell – by master Lazar Dimitrov from Bansko.

Initially, there was a little wooden house on the top of the tower. A Turkish figurine with a fez on its head would get out and bow every time the bells announced the hour. After the Liberation of Bulgaria in 1878 the local people took down and burned the Turkish symbol.

In 1924 a chitalishte (community center) was built next to the tower. Half a century later, according to restoration plans of the tower, the chitalishte was removed, and a Douglas Fir (g. Pseudotsuga) was planted next to the tower. The height of the tree eventually almost reached the height of the tower. It became a valuable tree for the city and it is decorated for Christmas every year. However, the tall tree is located very close to the tower, and some specialists suggest its roots may threaten the symbol of the town.

In its century-long history, the architecture monument has undergone many conservation and restoration efforts, as well as artistic activities to keep its original style and appearance.

The clock tower is one of the 100 Tourist Sites of Bulgaria. The stamp for this object is in the Botevgrad History Museum.

== Description ==
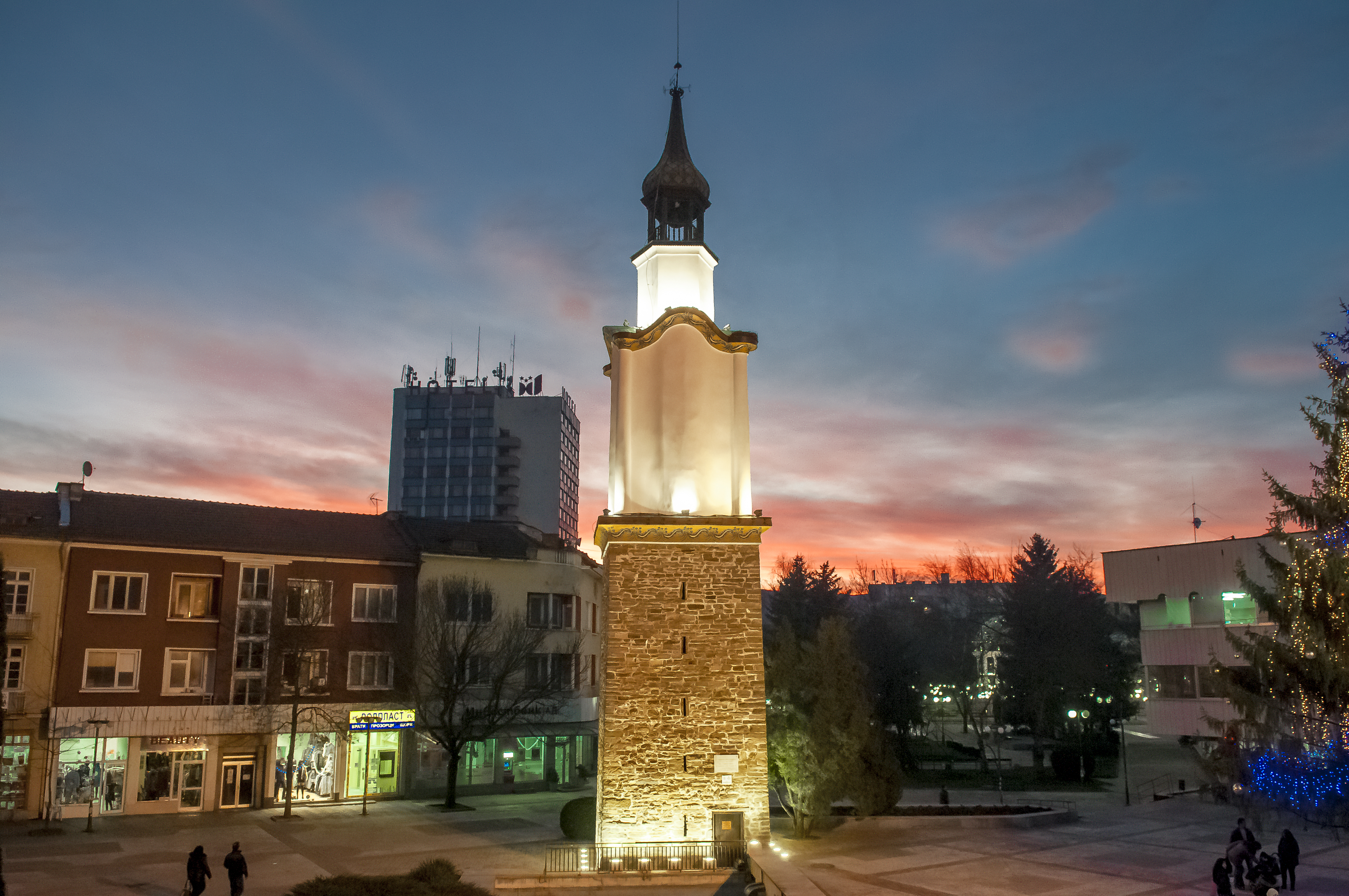
A night view of the clock tower

The clock tower is one of the few architectural monuments in the municipality of Botevgrad that date from the Bulgarian National Revival. It is located in the very center of the town.

=== Architecture ===
The tower consists of three proportional sections with the total height of 30 m, which makes it the tallest clock tower in Bulgaria. Distinctive features are its baroque elements and frescoes decorating the corrugated cornices. It contains similar architectural elements to those of the Plovdiv and Koprivshtitsa houses of the National Revival period, and a pointed cube reminiscent of the forms of Islamic architecture. It is decorated with blue frescoes. The building materials included stones from a quarry near the village of Bozhenitsa and timber from the Vrachesh area.

The lower section of the tower is square, reaching a height of 11 m. It has stone masonry with a door, which leads inside for servicing and winding the clock mechanism. The middle section is narrowed and its edges are outlined by half-columns, ending with cornices, and the walls are slightly wave-shaped, which adds elegance to the building. The upper section rises over the cornice and the cornice narrows even further. It has a hexagonal shape and houses the clock and the bell. In 1870 a weather-cock was placed on its very top. From the entrance of the tower to its last section, there are spiral-shaped wooden stairs, which lead to the clock mechanism.

=== Clock mechanism ===
The original clock mechanism is made by Gencho Nakov “Kantardjiata” and is exhibited in the Botevgrad History Museum. The new one is made by masters of the Etar Architectural-Ethnographic Complex and still counts the hours by bell rings with bell ringing audible within a radius of 3 km.

== Gallery ==
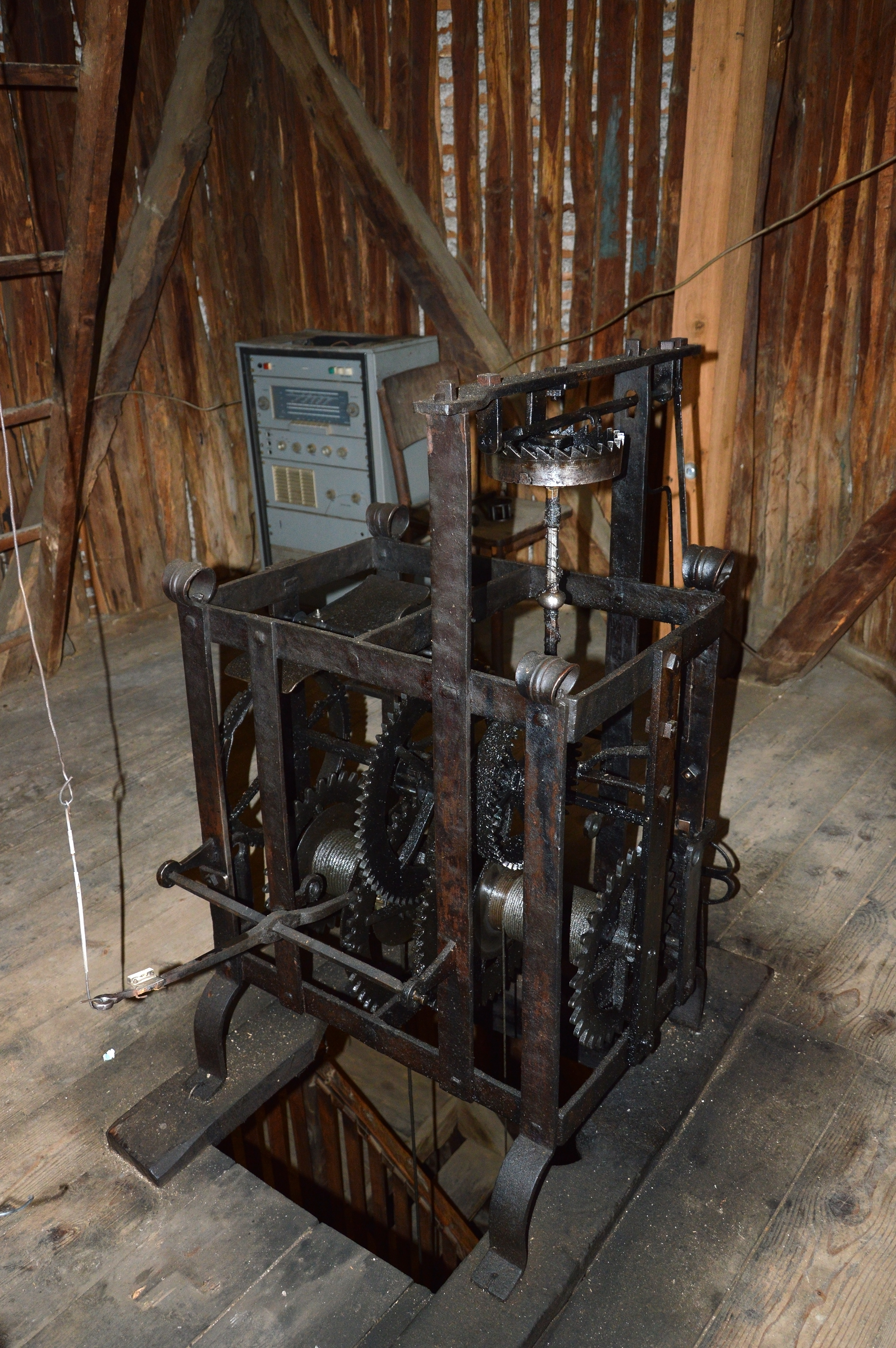
The working clockwork.

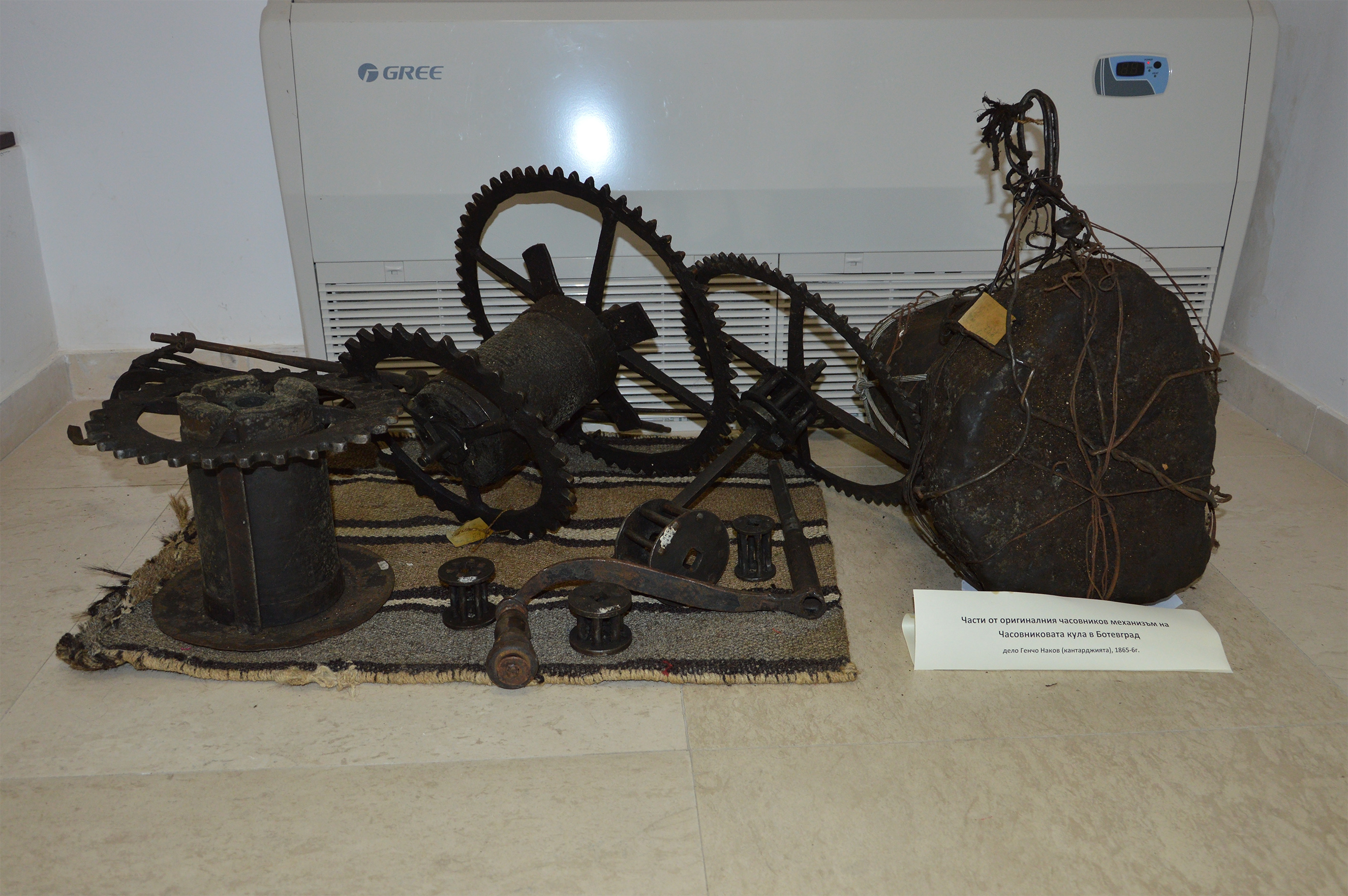
The old clockwork of Botevgrad's clock tower preserved in the local museum.

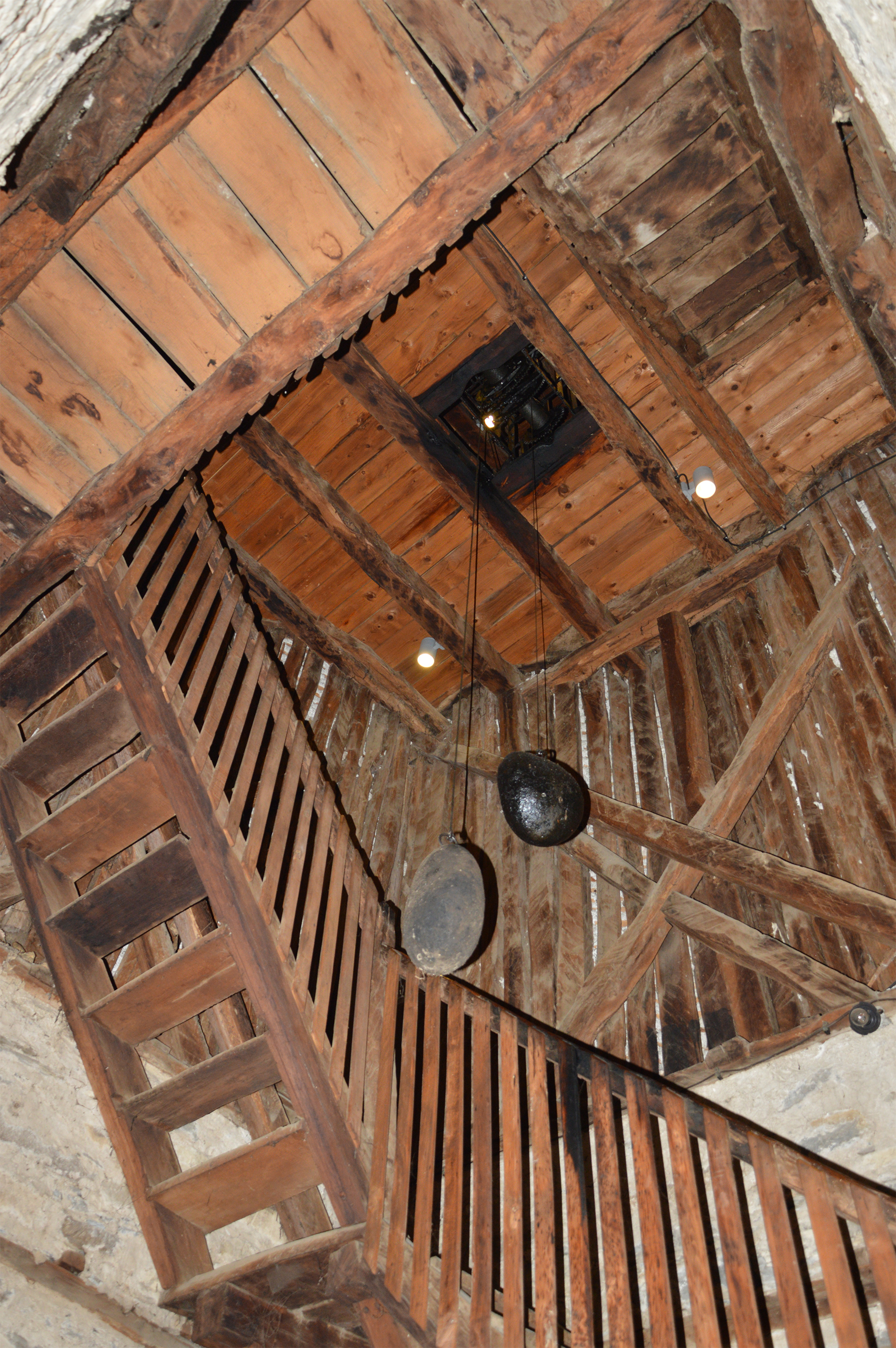
Staircase and weights of the clockwork.

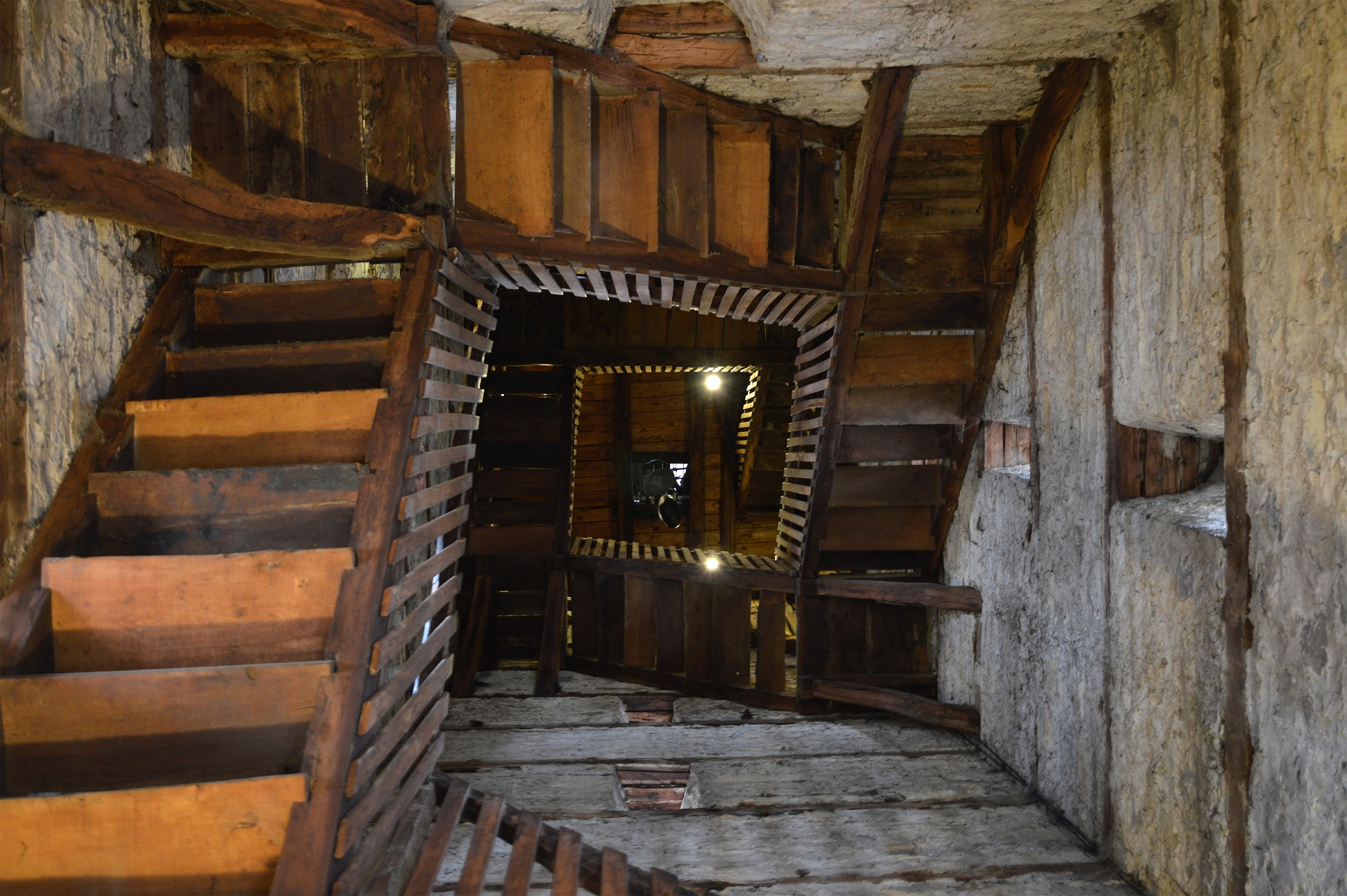
The staircase shot from below.
