= Chavdar (company) =

Bulgarian bus company

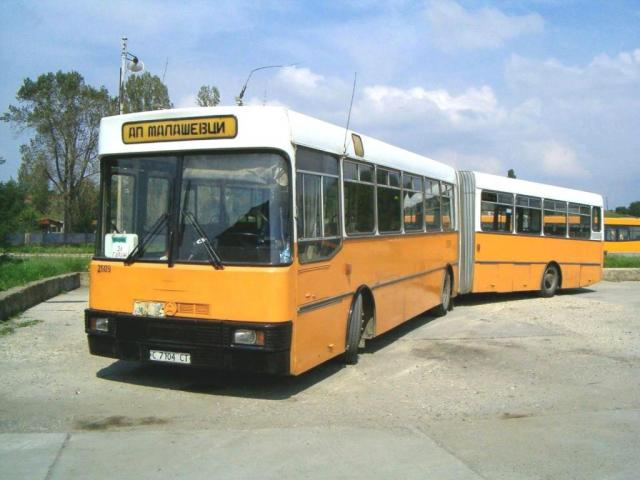
- Chavdar 141
- Native name: Чавдар
- Founded: 1924
- Defunct: 1999
- Headquarters: Botevgrad, Bulgaria
- Products: buses, trolleybuses

Chavdar (Bulgarian: Чавдар) was a Bulgarian bus builder located in the town of Botevgrad, Sofia Province. Founded by Racho Dzhambov in 1924, the company that would later become "Chavdar" produced around 200 buses between 1927 and 1947 on chassis from Ford Motor Company, Mercedes-Benz and Dodge. In 1948 the company was nationalised and acquired the name "Chavdar" in honour of the revolutionary Chavdar Voyvoda. It produced buses on chassis of Skoda 706 RTO but later shifted to license production of Setra and Steyr buses. It also developed several models on its own, which had good commercial success. The company closed in 1999.

== History ==
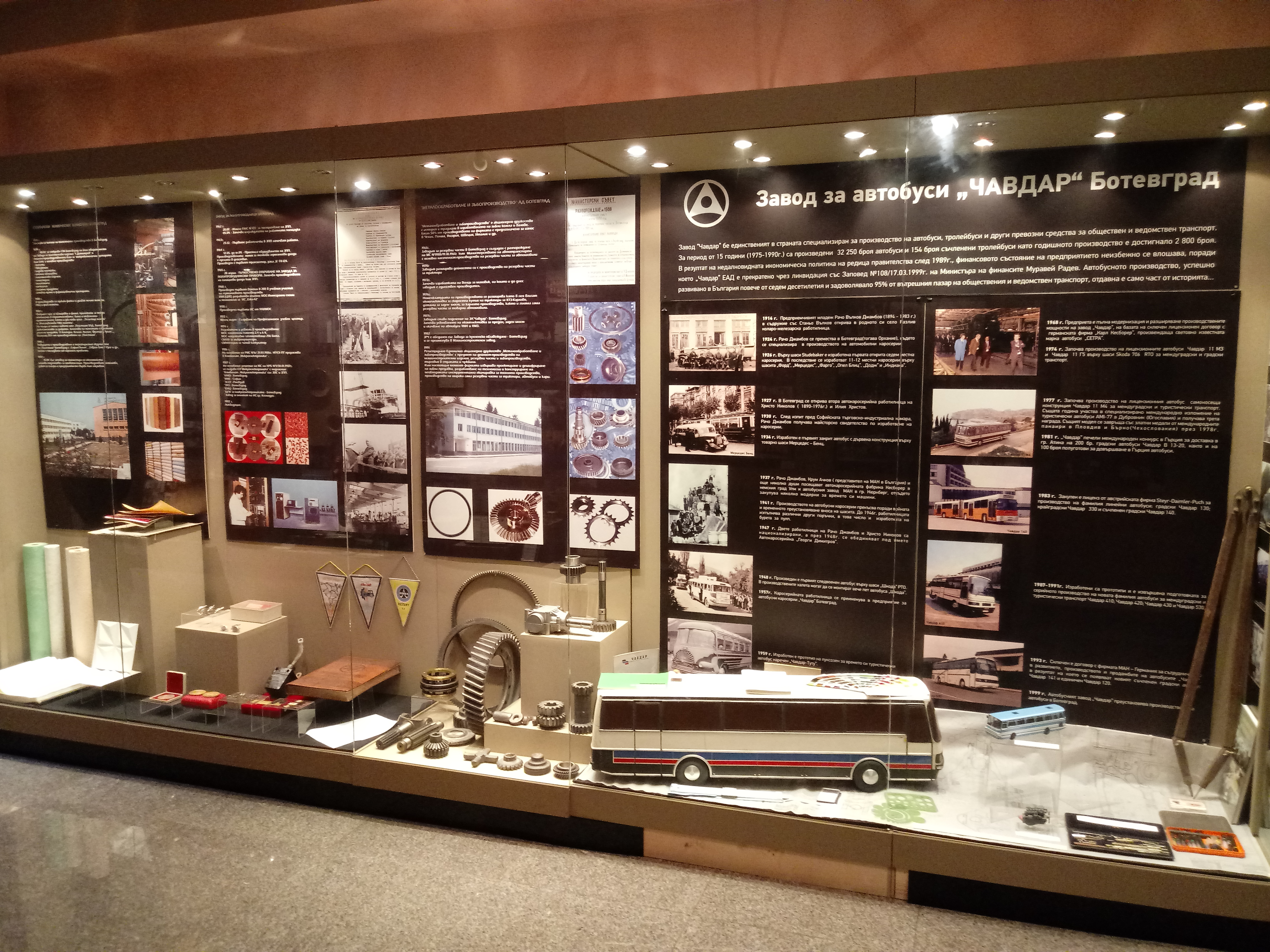
Chavdar Bus Factory showcase in the Botevgrad History Museum

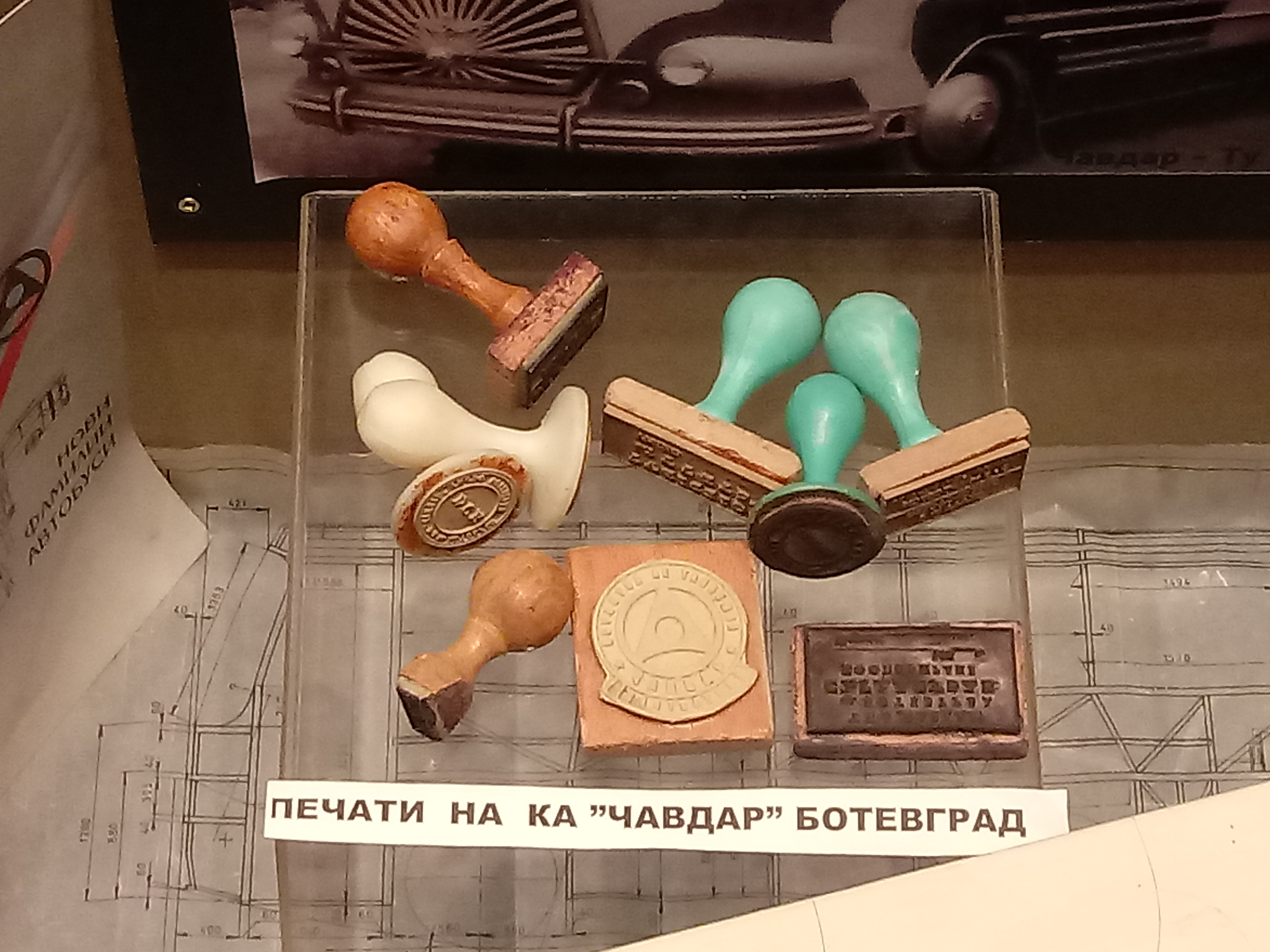
Seals of Chavdar Company

In 1924 Racho Valkov Dzhambov (1894-1983) opened an iron workshop in Botevgrad, Bulgaria. In 1927, Racho met with Ivan Valkov who had a transport business using rebuilt ambulances. He gave Racho one platform from Fiat to build his first vehicle on. After World War II, Bulgaria was ruled by a communist government and Dzhambov's workshop was nationalised. The new company was named Chavdar and by 1948 it had started producing buses based on Škoda RO. Until 1956 the production of the company increased by 150%.

In 1962, the company started production of the models M65 and M66 on Škoda 706 RTO chassis, which became very common on city and intercity services. In the same year, production of midi buses based on the Soviet GAZ-51 (1962-1969) started.

In 1966, the new models M80 (city bus) and M81 (intercity coach) appeared, based again on Škoda chassis. In 1968, between 400 and 500 units were produced. The same year, the factory started modernisation. New machines, new work strategy and new workplaces were described as the future success of the company.

An important part of Chavdar's history is the contract with the German coach builder Setra. In 1974, the company started production of the models 11G5 (city bus) and 11M3 (suburban bus) based on the contemporary Setra S100 series buses. Although the vehicles closely resembled their German counterparts, they were developed to fit the Škoda 706 RTO chassis, which produced buses without an analogue among Setra's model line. Similar to the Setra S150, Chavdar developed the intercity model 11M4, which had a Hungarian Rába D2156HM6U engine and won several prizes from international fairs. These models were the company's biggest success.

In the end of the 1970s the midi bus Chavdar 5C was constructed by Kiril Hadjiev and Lubomir Toshev and the first prototypes were tested in 1979. The bus used a Perkins engine and had 16 seats. It is known as being the first series 4x4 bus in the world. This model was widely used in smaller towns and villages in Bulgaria as public, school and worker bus.

In 1981, the city of Athens, Greece, opened a tender for the delivery of 200 new city buses. Especially for the tender, Chavdar developed in-house a brand new model - the B13-20. Despite rivalry from major Western European manufacturers, Chavdar won the tender and delivered 200 solo buses to Athens. An articulated version of the same bus, the Chavdar B14-20, also entered production. It was exported to Bashkortostan, USSR. Two trolleybus prototypes based on the B13-20 and B14-20 were developed, but they didn't enter serial production. At the same time a new midi bus on Avia chassis called Chavdar LC-51 entered production. It was exported to Czechoslovakia. In the second half of the 1980s several Bulgarian cities opened trolleybus systems. As trolleybus production capacity in Comecon was insufficient to cover the increasing demand, Chavdar developed in collaboration with Rocar DAC an articulated trolleybus named DAC Chavdar 317 Etr. Over 100 units were built for six trolleybus systems.

In 1984, Chavdar signed a contract with the Austrian Steyr-Daimler-Puch to produce city and suburban buses under license with production starting in 1988. The 130 (solo city bus) was built in a small series of circa 15 units, while from the 140 (articulated city bus) and 330 (solo suburban bus) only single prototypes were built. Based on them Chavdar developed the models 120 and 141 with MAN engines, which did not have an analogue among Steyr's model line. A trolleybus prototype with Chavdar 130 body was also built. The prototype trolleybus with fleet number 2525 became part of Sofia's trolleybus fleet in 1993 and remained in operation until 2010 when it was scrapped. In the same time small series of intercity coaches based on the Setra S200 model line were produced.

Due to financial instability and the difficult economic situation in the country following the fall of the communist regime, Chavdar declared bankruptcy in 1999. The factory in Botevgrad was reduced to ruins.

Chavdar exported its production to the USSR, Czechoslovakia, Greece, North Korea, Afghanistan and Nicaragua among others.

== Gallery ==
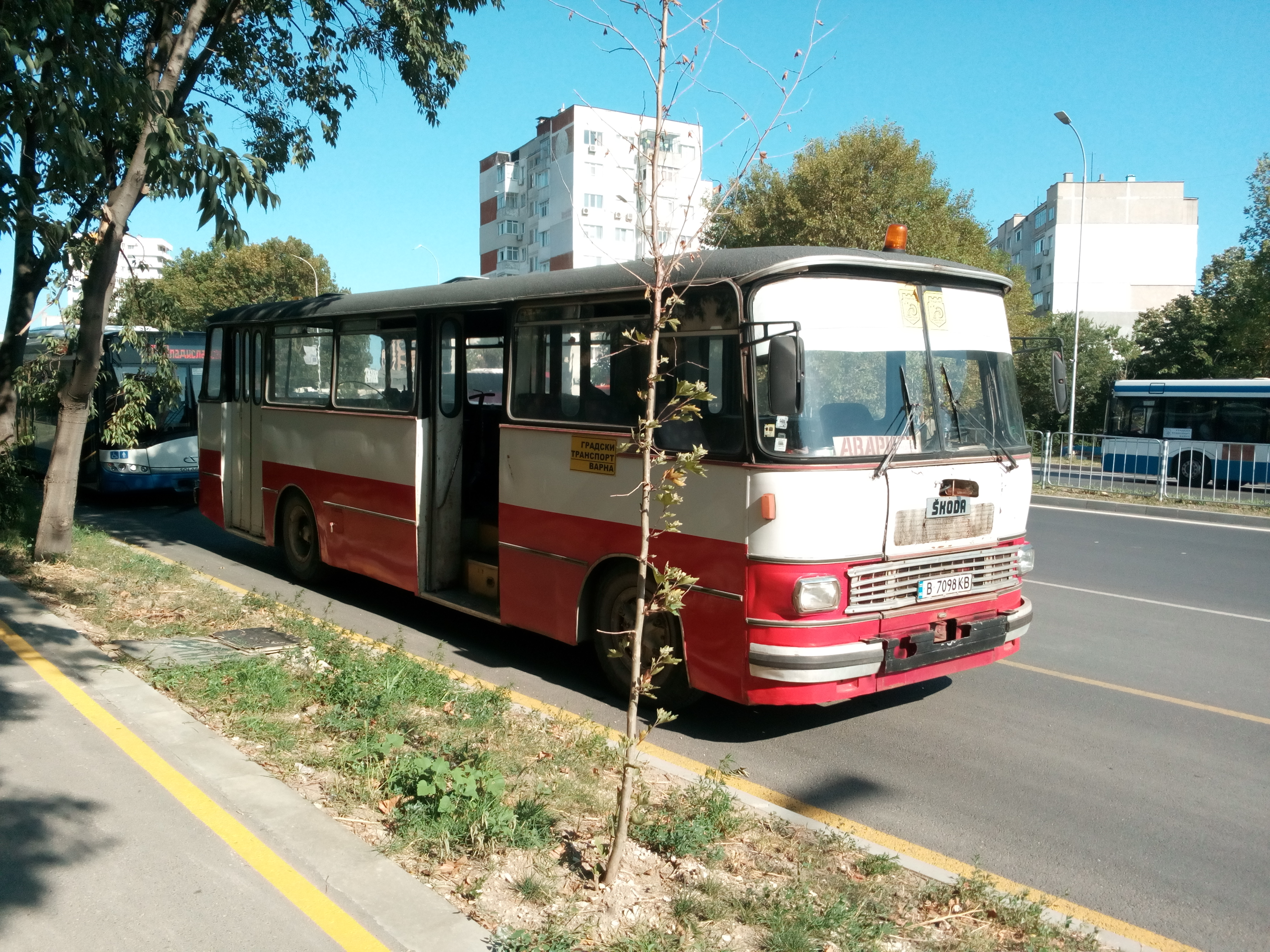
Chavdar 11G5

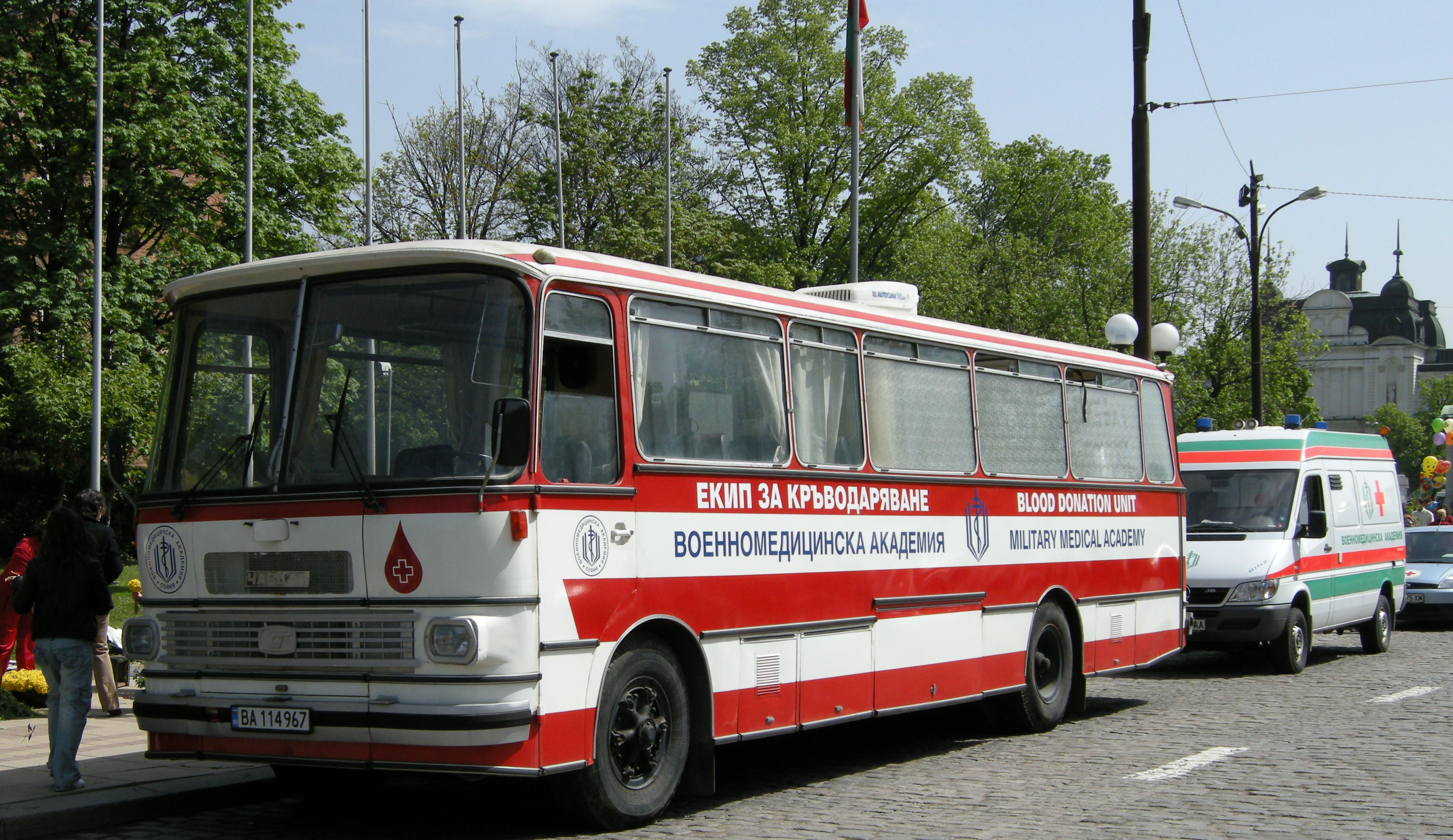
Chavdar 11M3

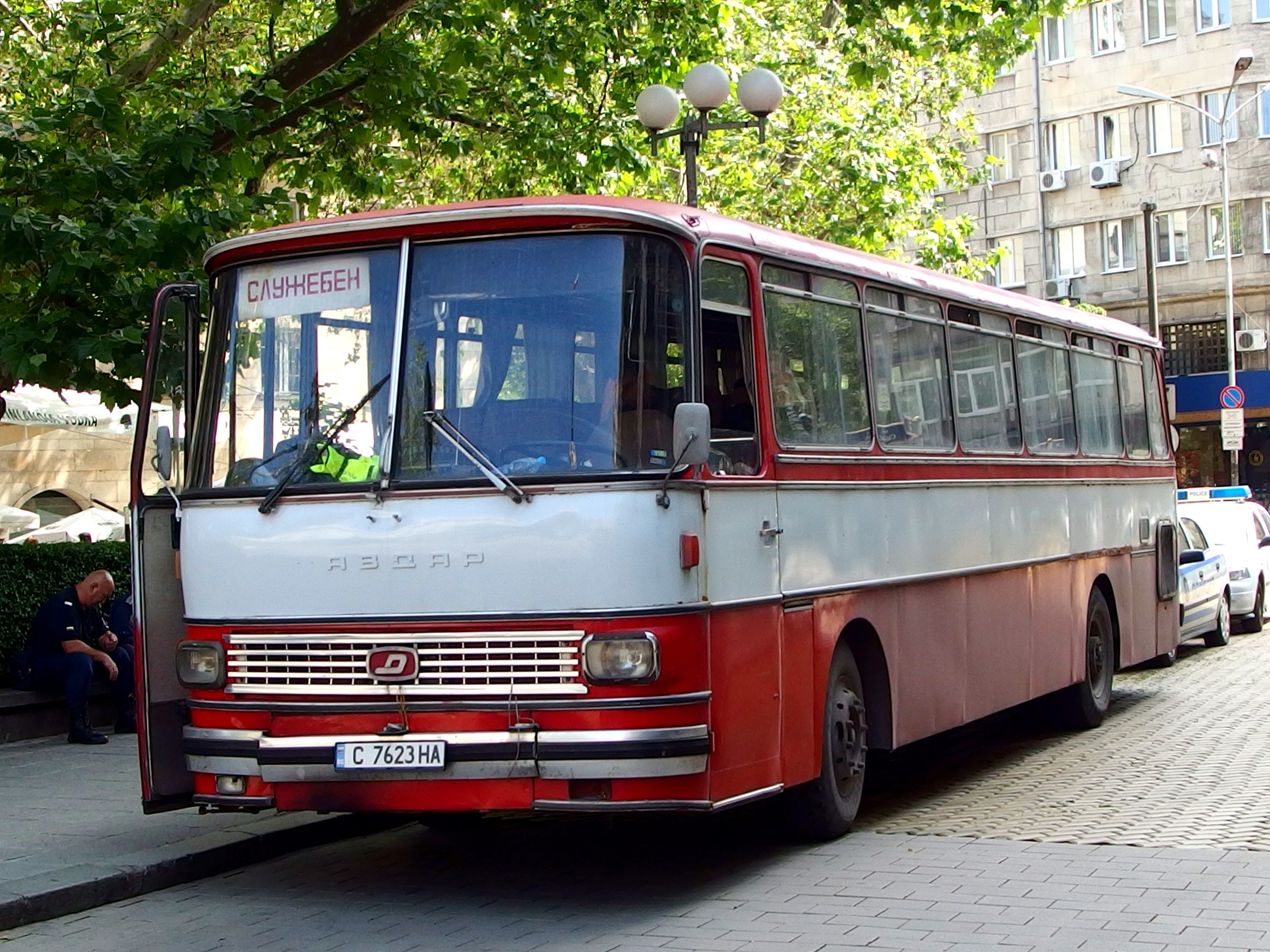
Chavdar 11M4

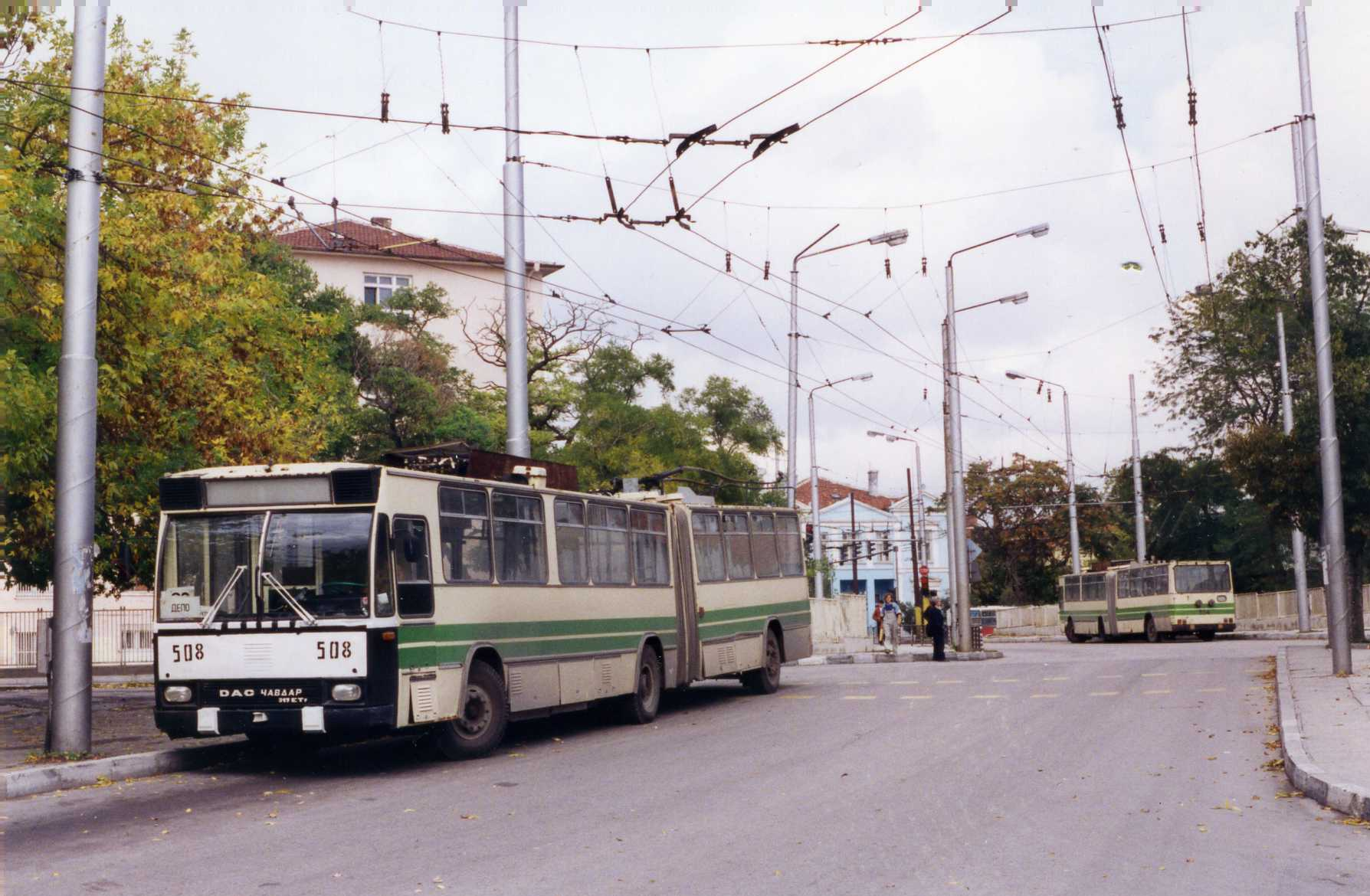
DAC Chavdar 317 Etr

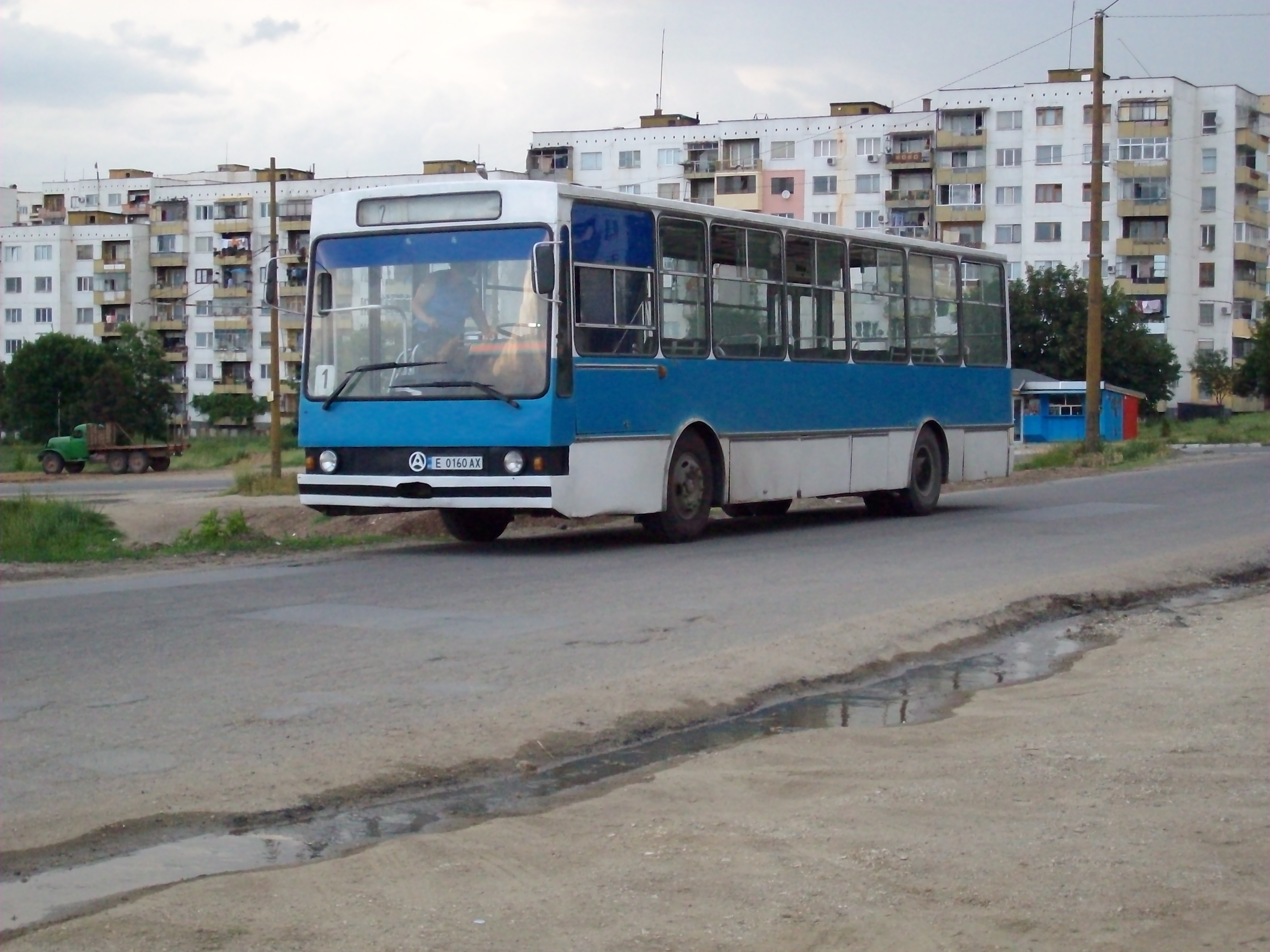
Chavdar B13-20

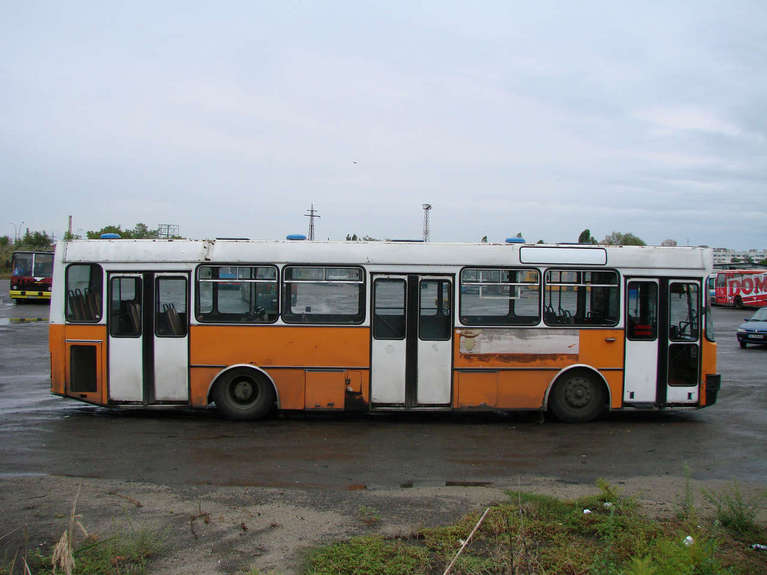
Chavdar 120

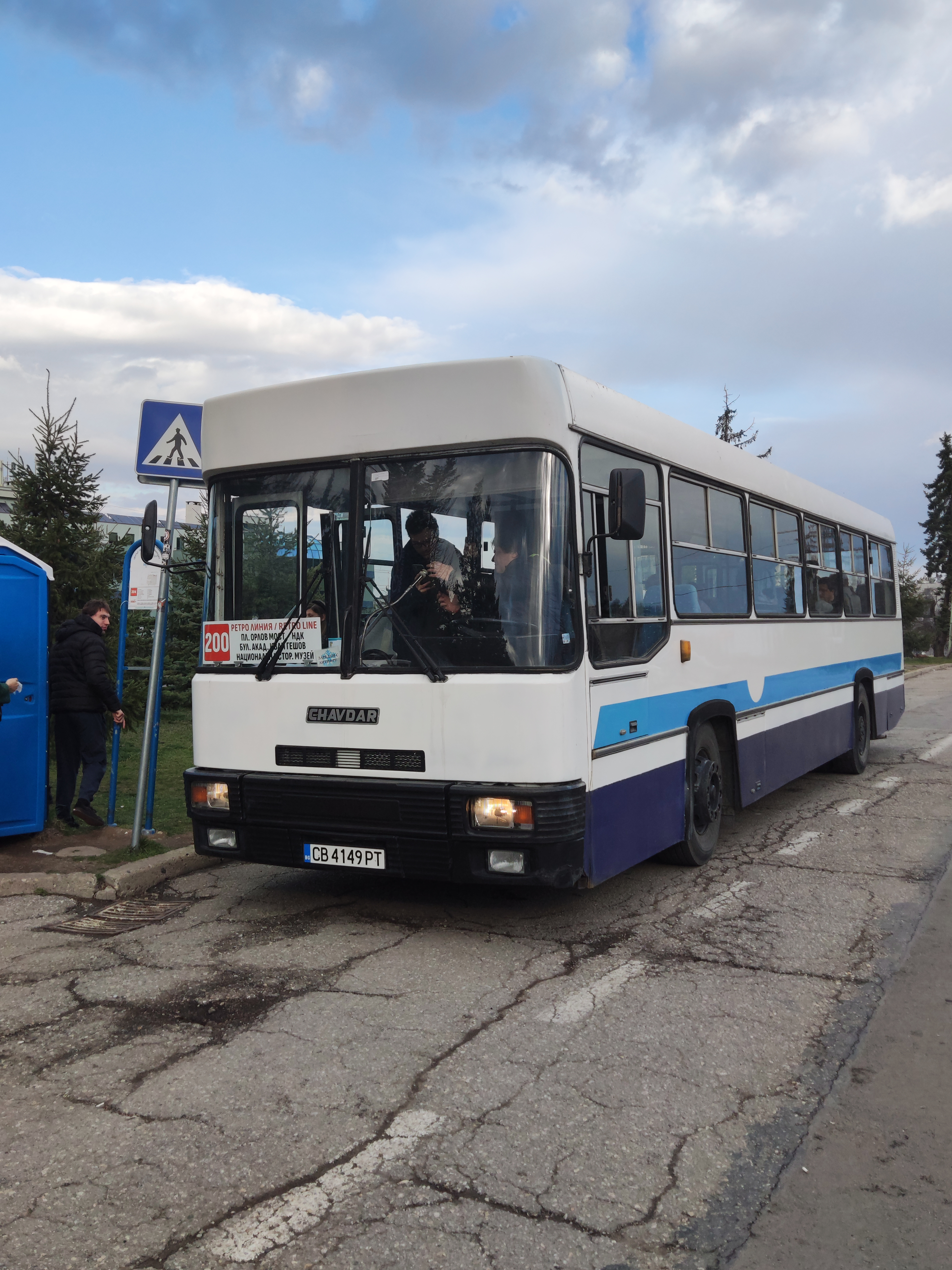
Chavdar 130

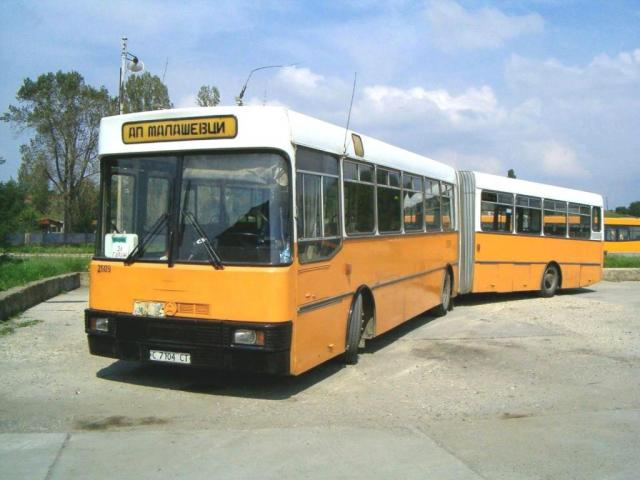
Chavdar 141

== Vehicles ==
- Midibuses
- Buses
- Trolleybuses

== Models ==
Chavdar M65

Chavdar M66

Chavdar M80

Chavdar M81

Chavdar 5C

Chavdar LC-51

Chavdar 11G5

Chavdar 11M3

Chavdar 11M4

Chavdar B13-20

Chavdar B14-20

Chavdar 120

Chavdar 130

Chavdar 141
