= Bebresh =

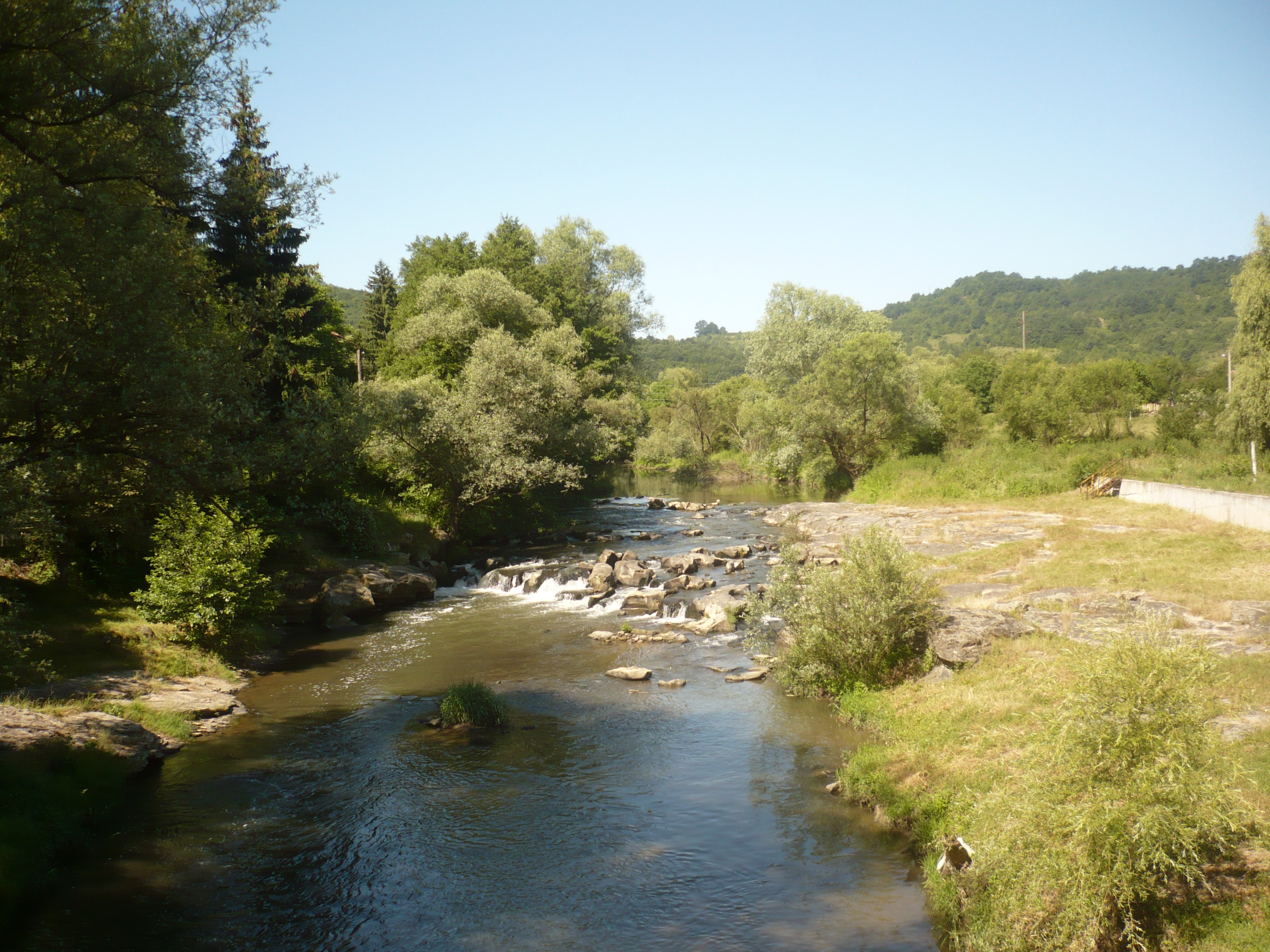

Location
- Country: Bulgaria

Physical characteristics
- Source
  - location: NW of Zvezdets summit, Balkan Mountains
  - coordinates: 42°47′22.02″N 23°53′25.35″E
  - elevation: 1,440 m (4,720 ft)
- Mouth
  - location: Iskar
  - coordinates: 43°0′54″N 23°52′35.04″E
  - elevation: 215 m (705 ft)
- Length: 46 km (29 mi)
- Basin size: 492 km^{2} (190 sq mi)

Basin features
- Progression: Malki Iskar→ Iskar→ Danube→ Black Sea

The Bebresh (Bulgarian: Бебреш) is a 46 km-long river in western Bulgaria, a left tributary of the river Malki Iskar, itself a right tributary of the Iskar. It is the largest tributary of the Malki Iskar.

== Geography ==
The Bebresh takes its source under the name Klisurska (Клисурска) at an altitude of 1,440 m just 30 m south of a shelter about a kilometer northnorthwest of the summit of Zvezdets (1,654.8 m) in the Etropole Mountain of the Balkan Mountains. Until the village of Vrachesh the river flows in a deep forested valley between the mountains of Bilo to the northeast and Murgash to the south west in general direction northwest and then north, before entering the Botevgrad Valley. Near the village of Novachene, it turns east, crosses the Gola Glava ridge of the fore-Balkan through the Novachene Gorge and flows into the Iskar at an altitude of 215 m at the village of Svode.

Its drainage basin covers a territory of 492 km^{2} or 38.3% of the Malki Iskar's total.

The Bebresh has rain-snow feed with high water in April–June and low water in July–October. The average annual discharge at its mouth at Svode is 4.2 m^{3}/s.

== Settlements and economy ==
The river flows entirely in Sofia Province. There are three villages along its course: Vrachesh, Skravena and Bozhenitsa, all of them in Botevgrad Municipality. The river and the homonymous reservoir 3 km upstream of Vrachesh are utilized for irrigation and potable water supply of the Botevgrad Valley. Bebresh reservoir has a volume of 15.1 million m^{3} and is a popular spot for anglers, with fish autochthonous species such as common barbel, Romanian barbel, European chub, Danube bleak and gudgeon.

Along its valley down from the Vitinya Pass runs a 21.7 km stretch of the first class I-1 road Vidin–Sofia–Kulata. The river is also bridged by the 120 m high Bebresh Viaduct on the Hemus motorway.

Close to the river are located the Skravena Monastery and the Transfiguration of God Monastery, both founded during the Second Bulgarian Empire in the 12–14th centuries.

== Gallery ==
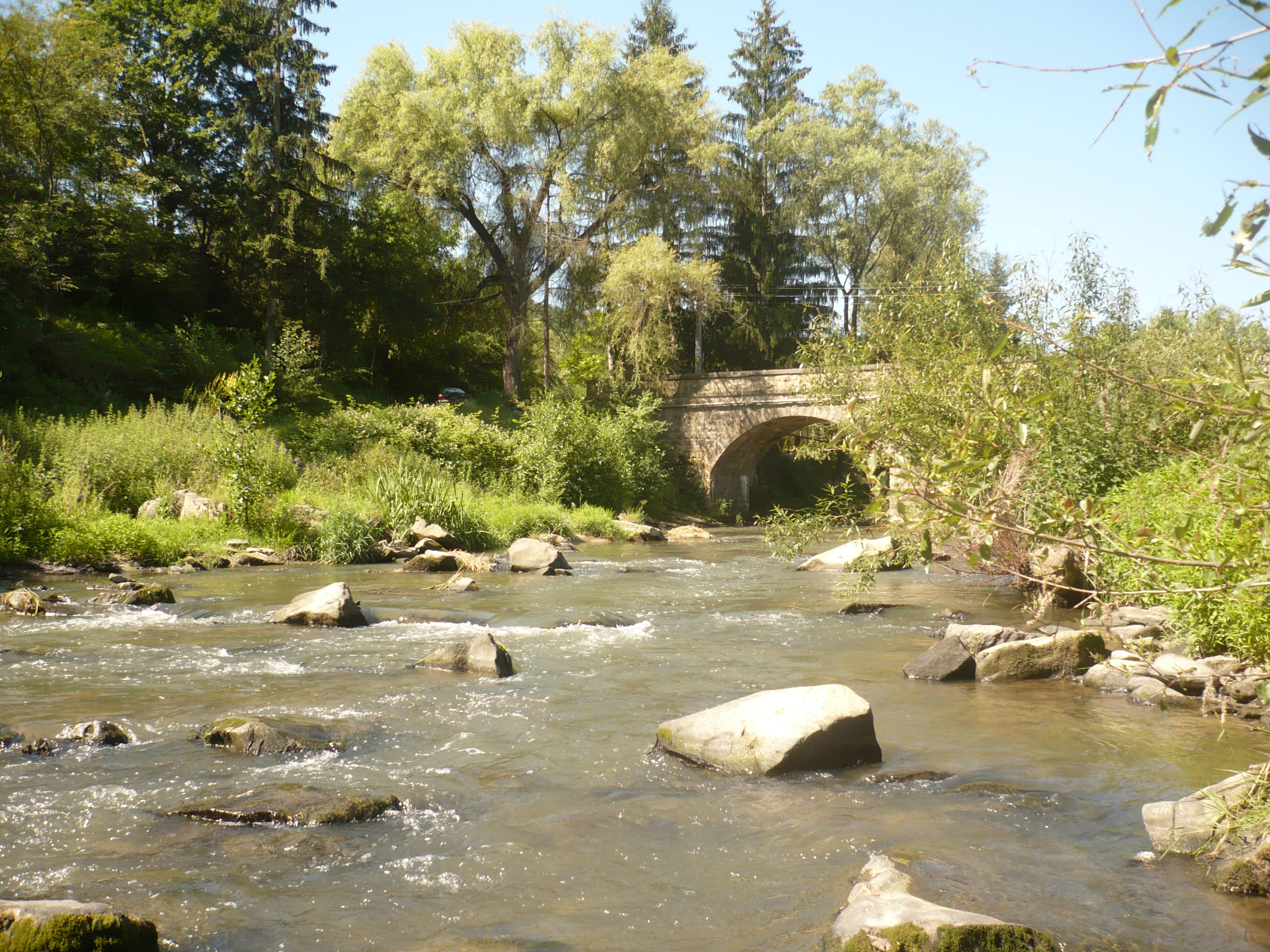

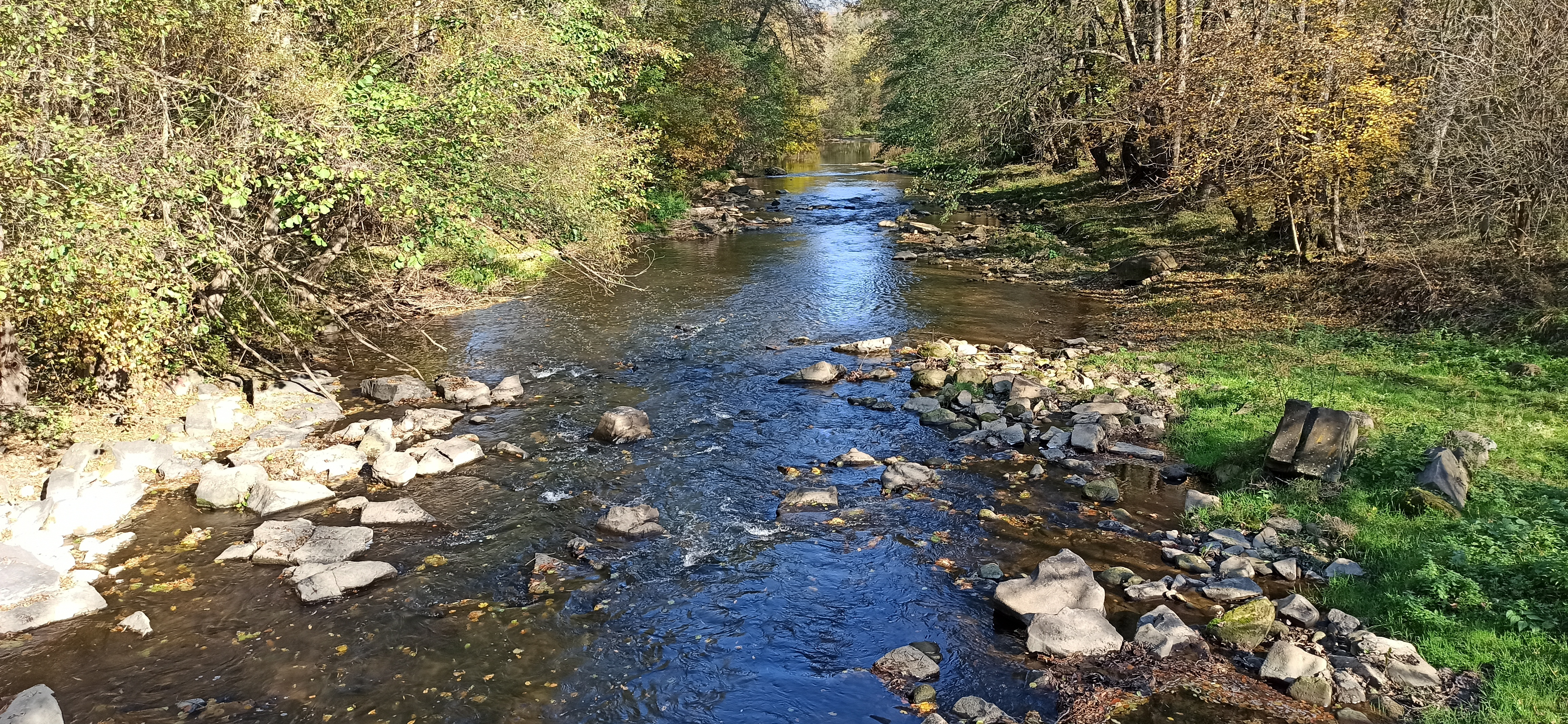

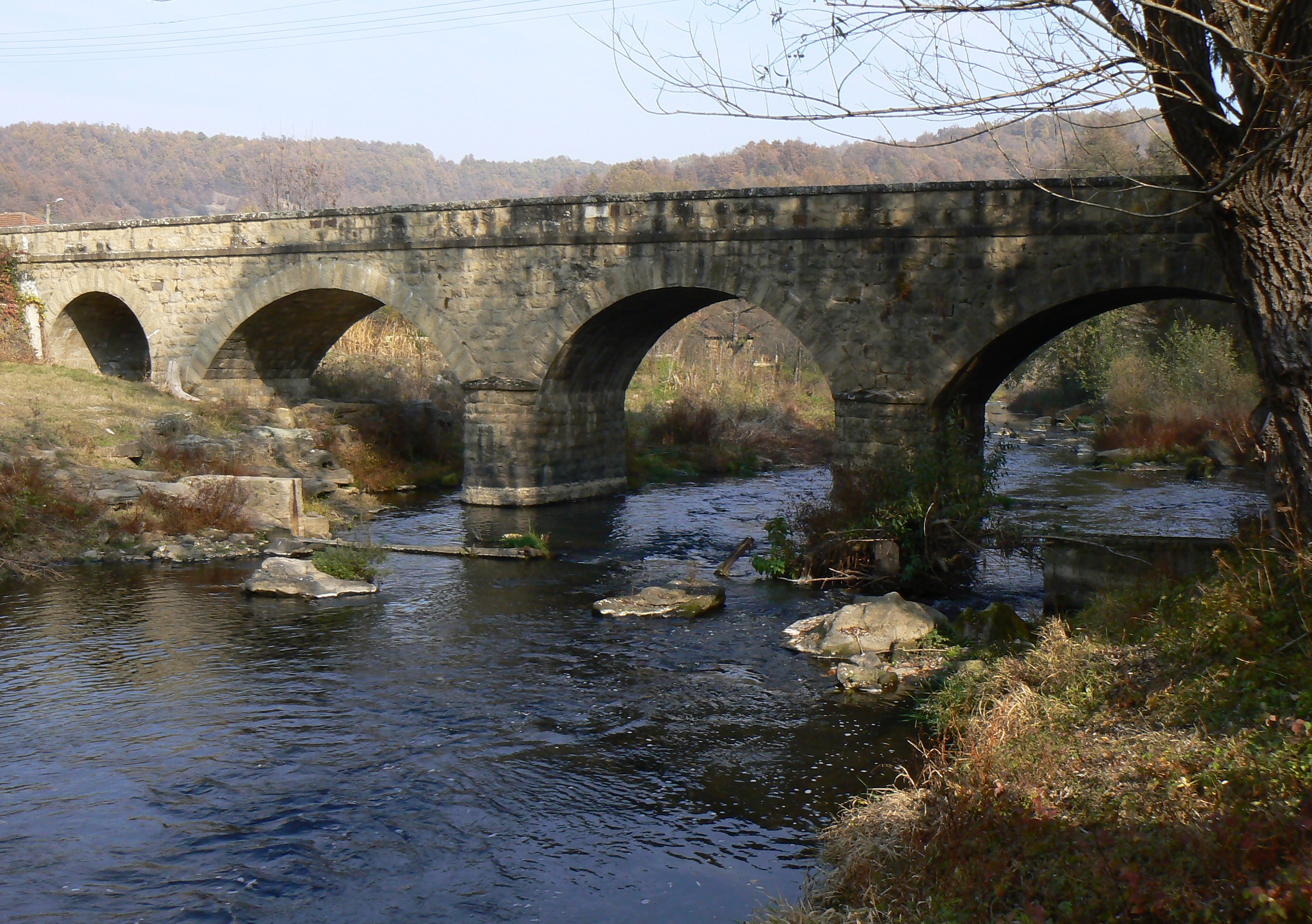
