= Yablanitsa =

Yablanitsa Ябланица
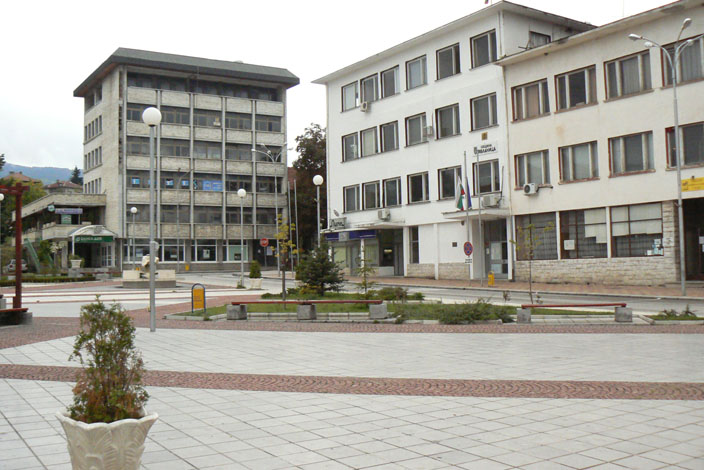
- Town center

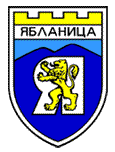
- Coat of arms

- Location of Yablanitsa
- Coordinates: 43°2′N 24°7′E
- Country: Bulgaria
- Provinces (Oblast): Lovech

Government
  - Mayor: Ivan Tsakov (independent)
- Elevation: 475 m (1,558 ft)

Population (December 2011)
  - Total: 2,854
- Time zone: UTC+2 (EET)
  - Summer (DST): UTC+3 (EEST)
- Postal Code: 5750
- Area code: 06991
- License plate: OB
- Website: http://www.yablanitsa.org/

Yablanitsa (Bulgarian: Ябланица; also Jablanica, Iablanica, Yablanica, Jablanitsa, Iablanitsa, Jablanitza, Yablanitza, Iablanitza, pronounced [ˈjabwɐnit͡sɐ]) is a small town in the westernmost part of Lovech Province, central-north Bulgaria, located in the area of the Pre-Balkan, north of the Stara Planina mountain. It is the administrative centre of the homonymous Yablanitsa Municipality. The town is situated 70 kilometres from the capital Sofia, near the Hemus motorway linking Sofia and Varna. It was proclaimed a town in 1968. As of December 2011, Yablanitsa had a population of 2,854.

The town is a noted confectionery production centre, particularly well known for the local halva and lokum (Turkish delight).

== Municipality ==
Yablanitsa is the administrative center of Yablanitsa municipality (part of Lovech Province), which includes the following nine localities: Batultsi, Brestnitsa, Dabravata, Dobrevtsi, Golyama Brestnitsa, Malak Izvor, Oreshene, Yablanitsa, and Zlatna Panega.

== Districts ==
There are several neighborhoods in Yablanitsa — the bigger ones are the former villages of Shumnene and Devette dola (literally The nine valleys), and there are also smaller and more distant ones like Prelog, Nanovitsa, Lipovo, Gerana, etc. Shumnene is located in the area called Dragoitsa, below the popular rock formation Venetsa (The wreath). The area offers a view to the rock and a panorama of the Balkan mountains.

== Legacy ==
The Yablanitsa Glacier on Smith Island, South Shetland Islands is named after Yablanitsa.

== Gallery ==
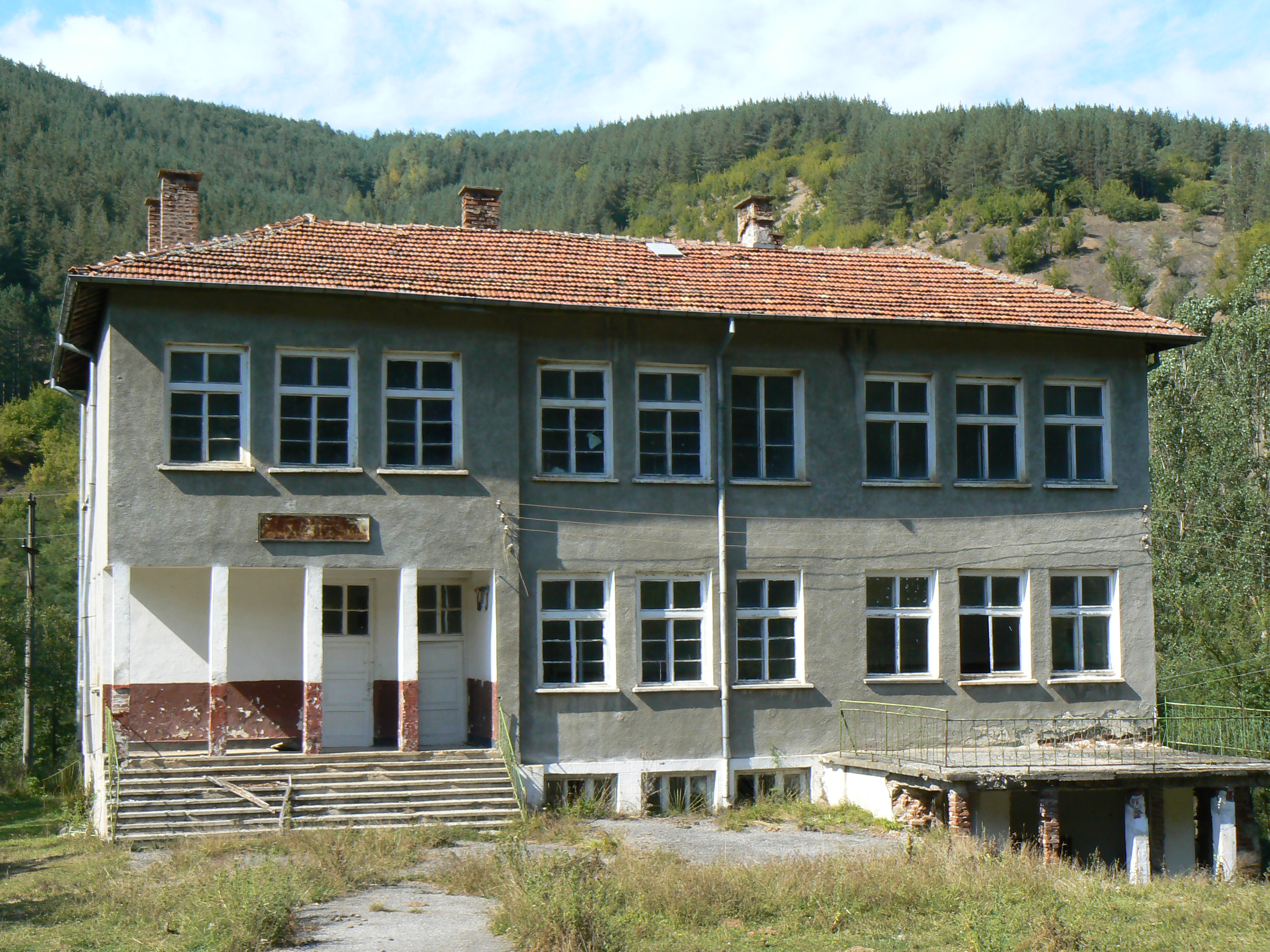
The obsolete school in Yablanitsa
