= European route E772 =

Road in trans-European E-road network

Coordinates: 43°5′25″N 25°31′31″E

E772

Route information
- Length: 415 km (258 mi)

Major junctions
- From: Jablanica
- Veliko Tarnovo
- To: Šumen

Location
- Countries: Bulgaria

Highway system
- International E-road network; A Class; B Class

European route E772 is a class B road, part of the International E-road network in Bulgaria. It connects the two sections of the Hemus motorway (A2) constructed so far, and is part of one of the most important transport corridors in the country: from the capital Sofia in the west to Varna and the northern Bulgarian Black Sea Coast in the east.

The road starts near Yablanitsa and ends near Shumen. It serves as a connection between the provincial capitals Shumen, Targovishte, Veliko Tarnovo and Lovech with Sofia and the port of Varna. It is a two-lane road (one lane in each direction). There are few three-lane parts for overtaking. The road surface is in a comparatively good condition since it is one of the main roads in northern Bulgaria and will remain so until the completion of the Hemus motorway.

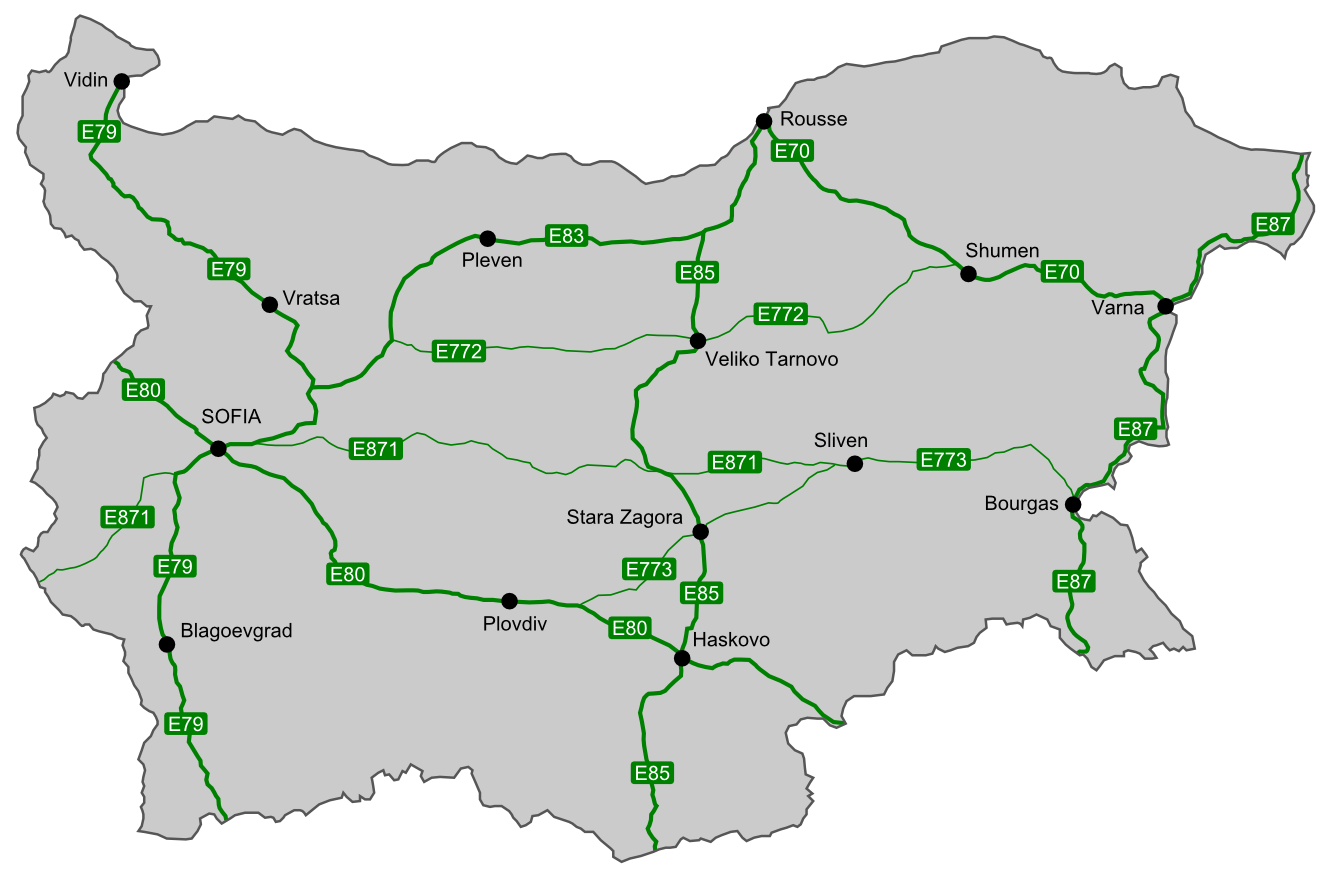
The E-road network in Bulgaria

== Route ==
- Bulgaria
  - E83 Jablanica
  - E85 Veliko Tarnovo
  - E70 Šumen

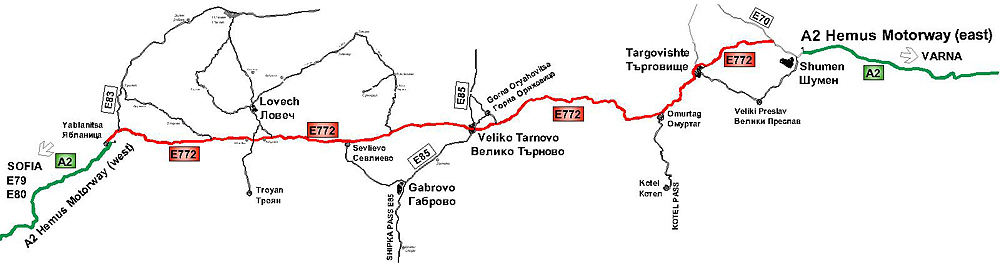
From west to east: Yablanitsa, Sevlievo, Veliko Tarnovo, Omurtag, Targovishte, Shumen

== See also ==
Roads in Bulgaria
Highways in Bulgaria
