= Malak Izvor =

Malak Izvor refers to the following places in Bulgaria:

- Malak Izvor, Haskovo Province
- Malak Izvor, Lovech Province
