= Golyama Brestnitsa =

Golyama Brestnitsa Голяма Брестница
- Village
- Location within Bulgaria
- Coordinates: 43°6′N 24°13′E
- Country: Bulgaria
- Province: Lovech Province
- Municipality: Yablanitsa

Area
  - Total: 19.202 km^{2} (7.414 sq mi)
- Elevation: 353 m (1,158 ft)

Population (2023)
  - Total: 128
- Time zone: UTC+2 (EET)
  - Summer (DST): UTC+3 (EEST)
- Postal Code: 5753

Golyama Brestnitsa (Bulgarian: Голяма Брестница) is a small hillside village in Yablanitsa Municipality, Lovech Province, northern Bulgaria. About 150 residents live here but some houses are holiday homes or for rental, making the village busier at weekends and during school holidays. A number of residents are from the UK or other countries in Europe.

== Geography ==
Golyama Brestnitsa lies in a hilly country facing the Danubian Plain to the north and the foothills of the Balkan Mountains to the south. From the Danchova Mogila hill near the village there is a panoramic view to the Balkan peaks of Dragoitsa, Lisets, Vasilyov and Vezhen to the south.

The village is located 105 km north-east of the national capital Sofia via the A2 Hemus motorway and 55 km of the city of Lovech.

There is a daily bus service from the bus stop near the town hall to the village of Zlatna Panega and the municipal centre Yablanitsa (6 km away), from where there are buses to Sofia or Varna daily.

Lukovit is 12km and has large international supermarkets. The closest major town is Botevgrad (37km) along the A2 towards Sofia

There are numerous hikes and walks around the village and onward to Daben or Brestnitsa where the Saeva dupka caves. The cave has a naturally formed 400 meter corridor and hall.

== Economy ==
The main employer is the Titan Cement Factory in Zlatna Panga.

The village has a lively café/pub/shop and square, picnic area, town hall with meeting room, post office with shop, church, cemetery and four B&B accommodations (guest house, room rental and villa rental).

A number of villagers keep bees and sell honey to make extra income.
