= Zlatna Panega =

Zlatna Panega (Bulgarian: Златна Панега) may refer to:

- Zlatna Panega (river), a river in Bulgaria
- Zlatna Panega (village), in Yablanitsa municipality, Lovech Province
