= Bebresh Viaduct =

Bebresh Viaduct (виадукт „Бебреш“)
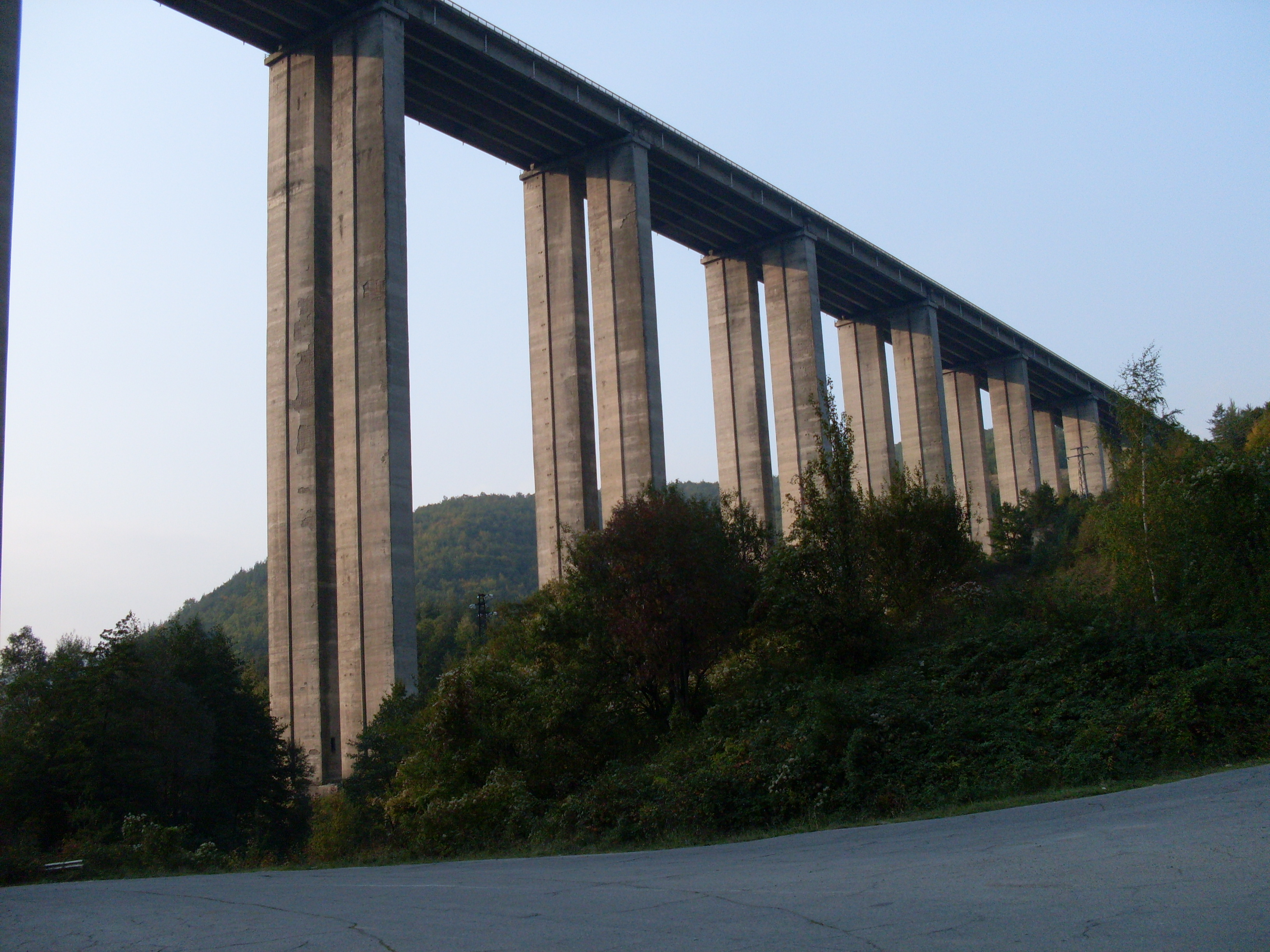
- Coordinates: 42°49′41″N 23°47′46″E
- Carries: Hemus motorway
- Crosses: valley of Bebresh river with I-1 road
- Locale: 5 km north of Vitinya Pass, Stara Planina, 60 km east of Sofia, Bulgaria

Characteristics
- Design: girder bridge, viaduct
- Total length: 720 m
- Longest span: 60 m
- Clearance below: 120 m

History
- Opened: 1985

Location
- Interactive map of Bebresh Viaduct (виадукт „Бебреш“)

Bebresh Viaduct (виадукт „Бебреш“) is a girder bridge part of the Bulgarian Hemus (or A2) motorway, which crosses the valley of the Bebresh river with the I-1 road. The viaduct is located 5 km north of Vitinya Pass and Vitinya tunnel in the Stara Planina mountains 60 km east of Sofia, at 650 m above sea level. It was opened in 1985 and was designed by the team of D. Dragoev, P. Minchev and Y. Todorov of Moststroy AD.

The viaduct is 720 m long and has 12 spans 60 m each. Rising 120 m above the ground, it is also regarded as the highest bridge in the Balkans and Bulgaria, with the precast post-tensioned girders being produced at the place and special equipment being used for the assembly. The Bebresh Viaduct is a favoured place for bungee jumping due to its height.
