= Yablanitsa Municipality =

Yablanitsa Municipality Община Ябланица
- Municipality
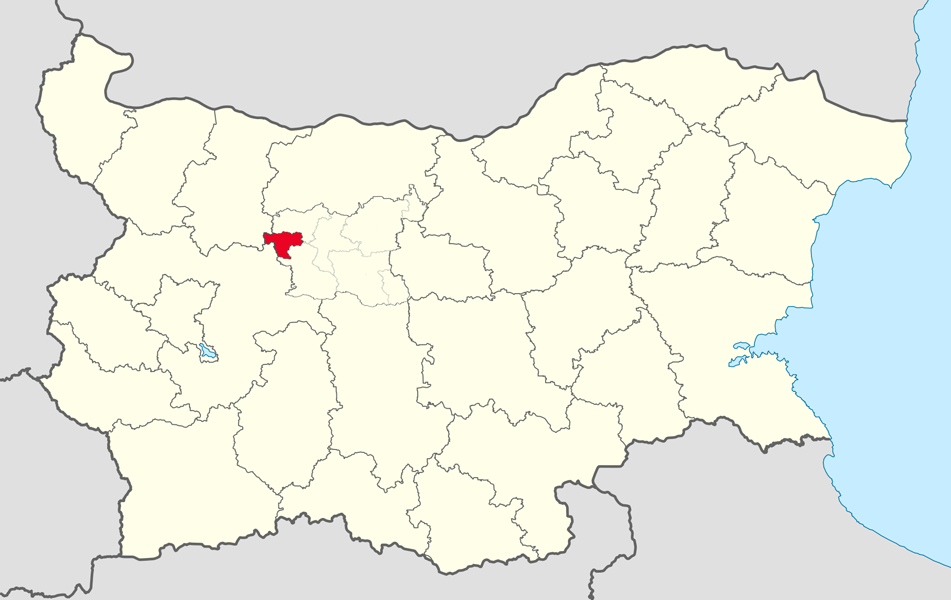
- Yablanitsa Municipality within Bulgaria and Lovech Province.
- Coordinates: 43°3′N 24°5′E
- Country: Bulgaria
- Province (Oblast): Lovech
- Admin. centre (Obshtinski tsentar): Yablanitsa

Area
  - Total: 276 km^{2} (107 sq mi)

Population (December 2009)
  - Total: 6,427
  - Density: 23.3/km^{2} (60.3/sq mi)
- Time zone: UTC+2 (EET)
  - Summer (DST): UTC+3 (EEST)

Yablanitsa Municipality (Bulgarian: Община Ябланица) is a small municipality (obshtina) in Lovech Province, Central-North Bulgaria, located in the area of the so-called Fore-Balkan, north of Stara Planina mountain. It is named after its administrative centre - the town of Yablanitsa.

The municipality embraces a territory of 276 km^{2} (107 sq mi) with a population of 6,427 inhabitants, as of December 2009.

As of 2010, the west operating part of Hemus motorway ends near the main town. The motorway is planned to connect the capital city of Sofia with the port of Varna on the Bulgarian Black Sea Coast.

== Settlements ==
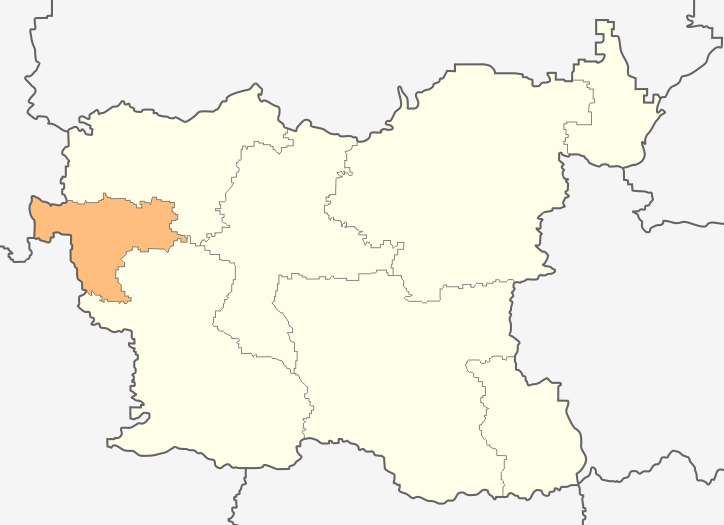
Yablanitsa Municipality within Lovech Province

Yablanitsa Municipality includes the following 9 places (towns are shown in bold):

Town/Village	Cyrillic	Population (December 2009)
**Yablanitsa**	**Ябланица**	2,896
Batultsi	Батулци	205
Brestnitsa	Брестница	1,062
Dobrevtsi	Добревци	547
Dabravata	Дъбравата	88
Golyama Brestnitsa	Голяма Брестница	182
Malak Izvor	Малък извор	243
Oreshene	Орешене	332
Zlatna Panega	Златна Панега	872
Total		6,427

== Demography ==
The following table shows the change of the population during the last four decades.

Yablanitsa Municipality
**Year**	1975	1985	1992	**2001**	2005	2007	2009	**2011**
**Population**	9,411	8,243	7,532	6,902	6,705	6,556	6,427	...
Sources: Census 2001, Census 2011, „pop-stat.mashke.org“,

=== Vital statistics ===
The municipality of Yablanitsa has one of the highest birth rate in Bulgaria. Especially Roma people in some villages tend to have high fertility rates.

	Population	Live births	Deaths	Natural growth	Birth rate (‰)	Death rate (‰)	Natural growth rate (‰)
2000	**7,195**	81	138	-57	11.3	19.2	-7.9
2001	**6,822**	91	136	-45	13.3	19.9	-6.6
2002	**6,816**	94	132	-38	13.8	19.4	-5.6
2003	**6,836**	102	116	-14	14.9	17.0	-2.0
2004	**6,751**	90	124	-34	13.3	18.4	-5.0
2005	**6,705**	95	114	-19	14.2	17.0	-2.8
2006	**6,629**	94	100	-6	14.2	15.1	-0.9
2007	**6,556**	89	98	-9	13.6	14.9	-1.4
2008	**6,451**	83	104	-21	12.9	16.1	-3.3
2009	**6,427**	102	92	10	15.9	14.3	1.6
2010	**6,334**	85	137	-52	13.4	21.6	-8.2
2011	**6,210**	82	100	-18	13.2	16.1	-2.9
2012	**6,150**	81	112	-31	13.2	18.2	-5.0
2013	**6,092**	85	106	-21	14.0	17.4	-3.4
2014	**6,017**	76	102	-26	12.6	17.0	-4.3
2015	**5,971**	66	103	-37	11.1	17.3	-6.2
2016	**5,902**	67	111	-44	11.4	18.8	-7.5
2017	**5,786**	82	136	-54	14.2	23.5	-9.3
2018	**5,727**	76	105	-29	13.3	18.3	-5.1
2019	**5,607**	58	118	-60	10.3	21.0	-10.7
2020	**5,742**	77	102	-25	13.4	17.8	-4.4
2021	**5,632**	76	150	-74	13.5	26.6	-13.1

=== Religion ===
According to the latest Bulgarian census of 2011, the religious composition, among those who answered the optional question on religious identification, was the following:

Religious composition of Yablanitsa Municipality
Orthodox Christianity	88.9%
Catholicism	0.6%
Protestantism	0.6%
Islam	0.5%
No religion	4.1%
Prefer not to answer, others and aindefinable	5.3%

== See also ==
- Provinces of Bulgaria
- Municipalities of Bulgaria
- List of cities and towns in Bulgaria
