= Oreshene, Lovech Province =

Oreshene Орешене
- Village
- Location within Bulgaria
- Coordinates: 43.1000°N 24.0833°E
- Country: Bulgaria
- Province: Lovech Province
- Municipality: Yablanitsa
- Time zone: UTC+2 (EET)
  - Summer (DST): UTC+3 (EEST)

The village of Oreshene is located in the pre-Balkan region, 8 km from Yablanitsa and 6 km from Zlatna Panega. It is close to the Danube plain and is a starting point for tourism. It is convenient to visit because the Hemus highway reaches Yablanitsa and is only 88 km from Sofia. Many residents of the capital focus on the village in view of the proximity, convenient travel and beautiful nature. Altitude is not high. Deciduous forests, bushes, wooded areas are found. In the vicinity of the village, at a short distance, there are many fountains, places of local importance and two micro-dams.

== History ==
The village was founded at the beginning of the 19th century by settlers from the village of Manaselska Reka. According to the legend told by the resident of Oreshene, Nayden Tsanov Vulev, the village of Manaselska Reka was attacked by Kurdzhalians and the survivors fled to the impregnable walnut forest, which is located on the site of today's Oreshene. That is where the name of the village comes from, because of the thick walnut forests. Where the village square, the fountain with water collector and the town hall are now, there was a large spring around which the first houses were built.

Over time, the walnut forests were cut down and mulberry trees were planted, and in the 19th and 20th centuries, one of the main livelihoods became gardening.

Above the village in the area of Bogoi, in the upper part next to the gypsy hamlet, there was another large spring with lakes and a mill. Now it has dried up and only a semi-marsh remains in its place. According to legend, the area was named after the boyar Bogoi, who refused to submit to the Turks and died in a battle with them.

In 1941, an enterprise for the production of wheels and bicycles under the "Balkan" brand was organized in the village of Oreshene. This marked the beginning of bicycle production in Bulgaria. In the period 41-46, more than 25,000 copies of three models were produced, a large part of them used in the Bulgarian post office and the army. After 1946, production was nationalized and moved to the town of Lovech. Bicycle production was resumed in 1957 and continued until 1988. The Balkan brand has been preserved and was very popular in Bulgaria.

By 1893, only 6 pomaks remained in the village.
