= Skravena Monastery =

Monastery in western Bulgaria

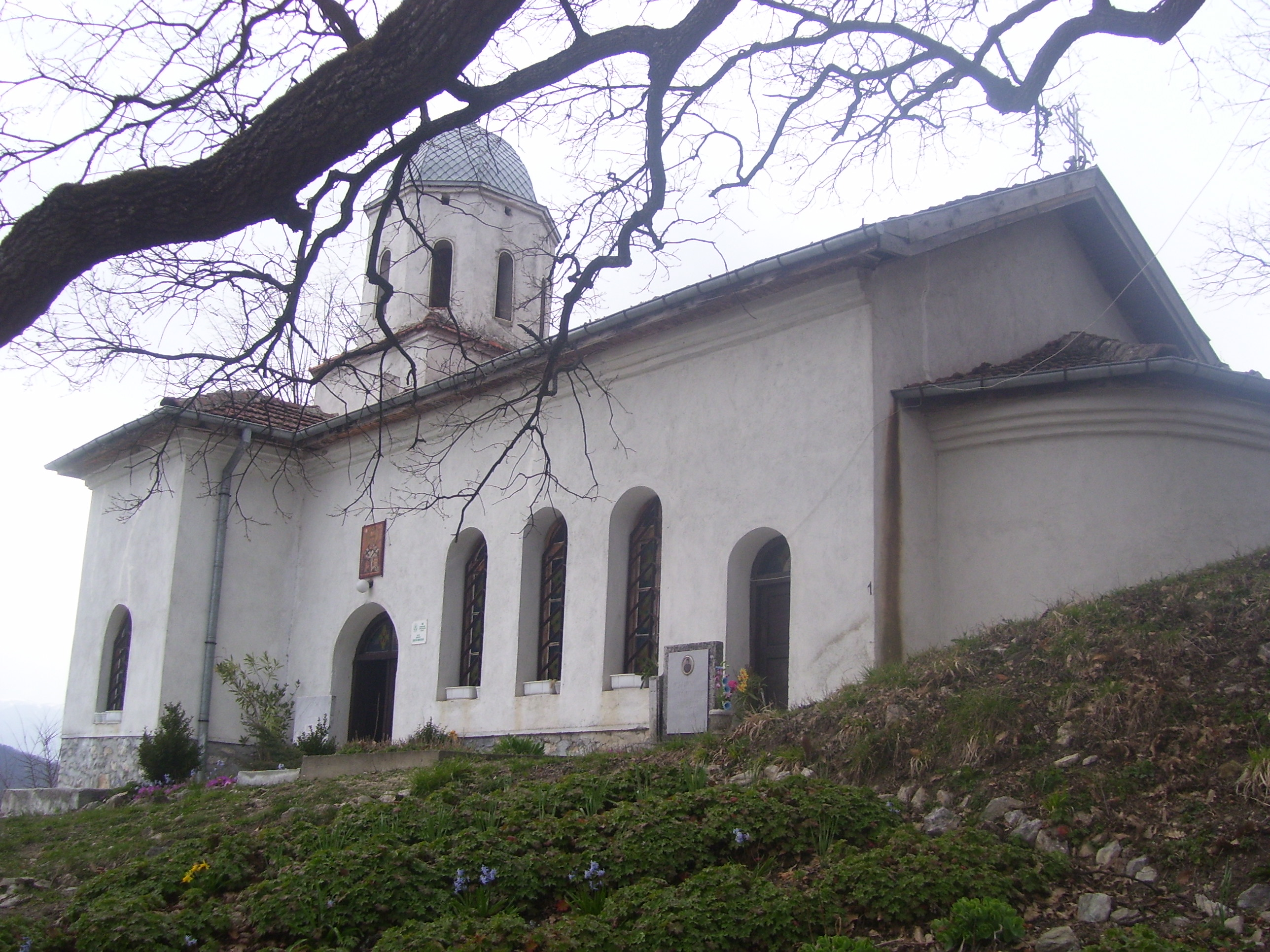
- Skravena Monastery

- Location within Bulgaria
- Interactive map of Skravena Monastery

Monastery information
- Other name: Skravena Monastery of Saint Nicholas
- Established: 13th century

Site
- Location: Skravena, Botevgrad Municipality, Sofia Province
- Coordinates: 42°57′7″N 23°46′4″E
- Public access: yes

The Skravena Monastery of Saint Nicholas (Bulgarian: Скравенски манастир „Свети Николай“) is a monastery of the Sofia Diocese of the Bulgarian Orthodox Church near the village of Skravena, western Bulgaria.

== Location ==
It is located at the southwest foothills of the Lakaviski Ridge of the western Balkan Mountains, 2 km northeast of the town of Botevgrad and the village of Skravena, and 1.5 km of the European route E79. A third-class road connects the monastery to Botevgrad and a first-class road leads to the south.

== History ==
In this area there are traces of the Thracian and Roman periods, which testify to rich material and spiritual culture. The remains of a rustic villa, as well as church buildings from the Middle Ages, have also been found. They were all probably part of an old settlement, called Gramade. Coins, foundations of buildings, labour tools and other objects have been unearthed that confirmed the monastery's existence on the site. The monastery was founded during the Second Bulgarian Empire and was among the most renown monasteries in the Balkan peninsula during 12-14th centuries. After the fall of Bulgaria under the Ottoman rule in the late 14th century, the monastery was destroyed several times by the Ottomans. The foundations were rediscovered in 1938. In 1947 it was restored and is now periodically active. The complex consists of a spacious one-nave, one-apse church with an emporium (balcony), a triple narthex with a bell tower above it and a residential building. In the courtyard there is a huge centuries-old oak tree, estimated to be over 600 years old.

== Gallery ==
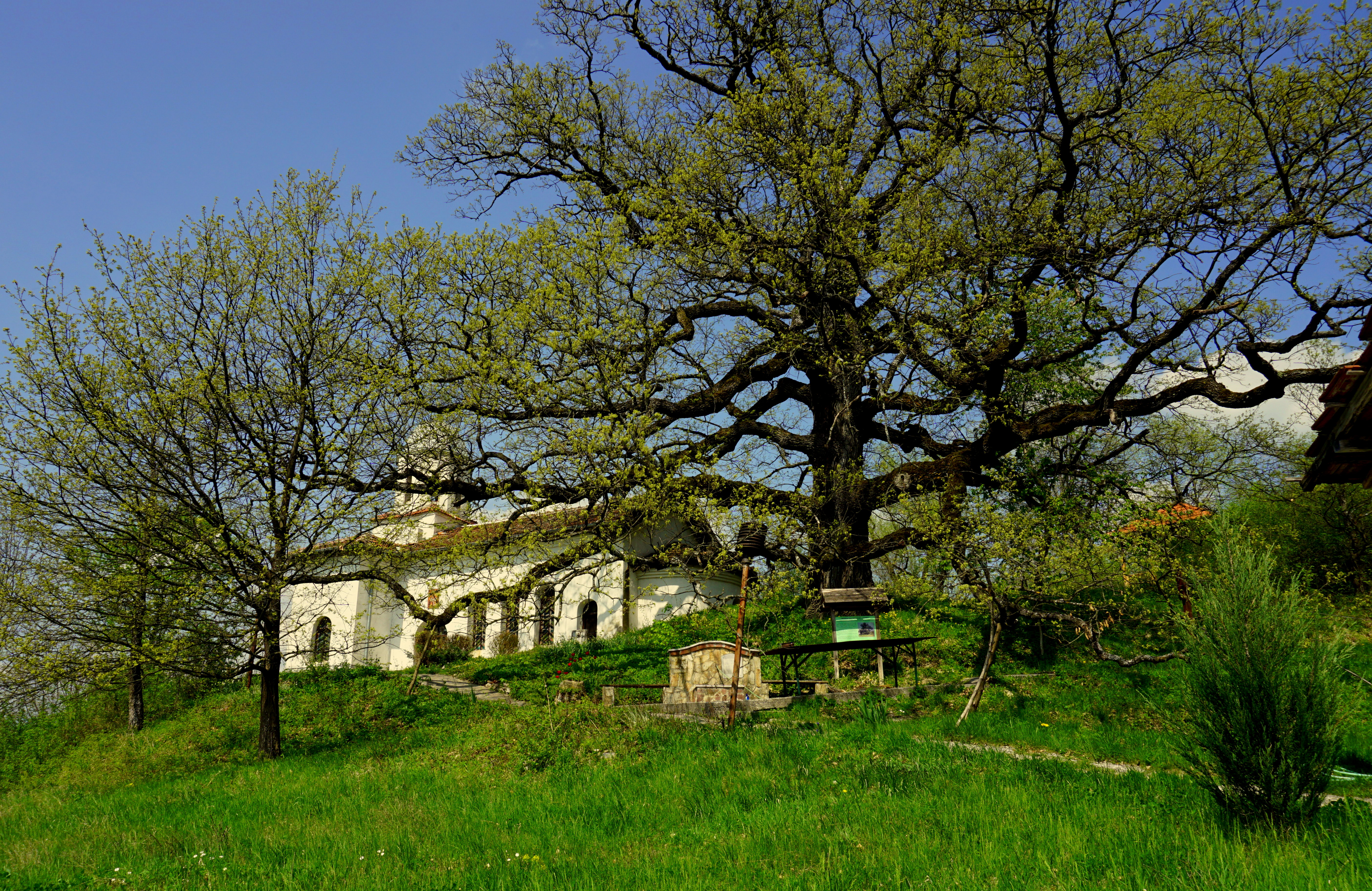

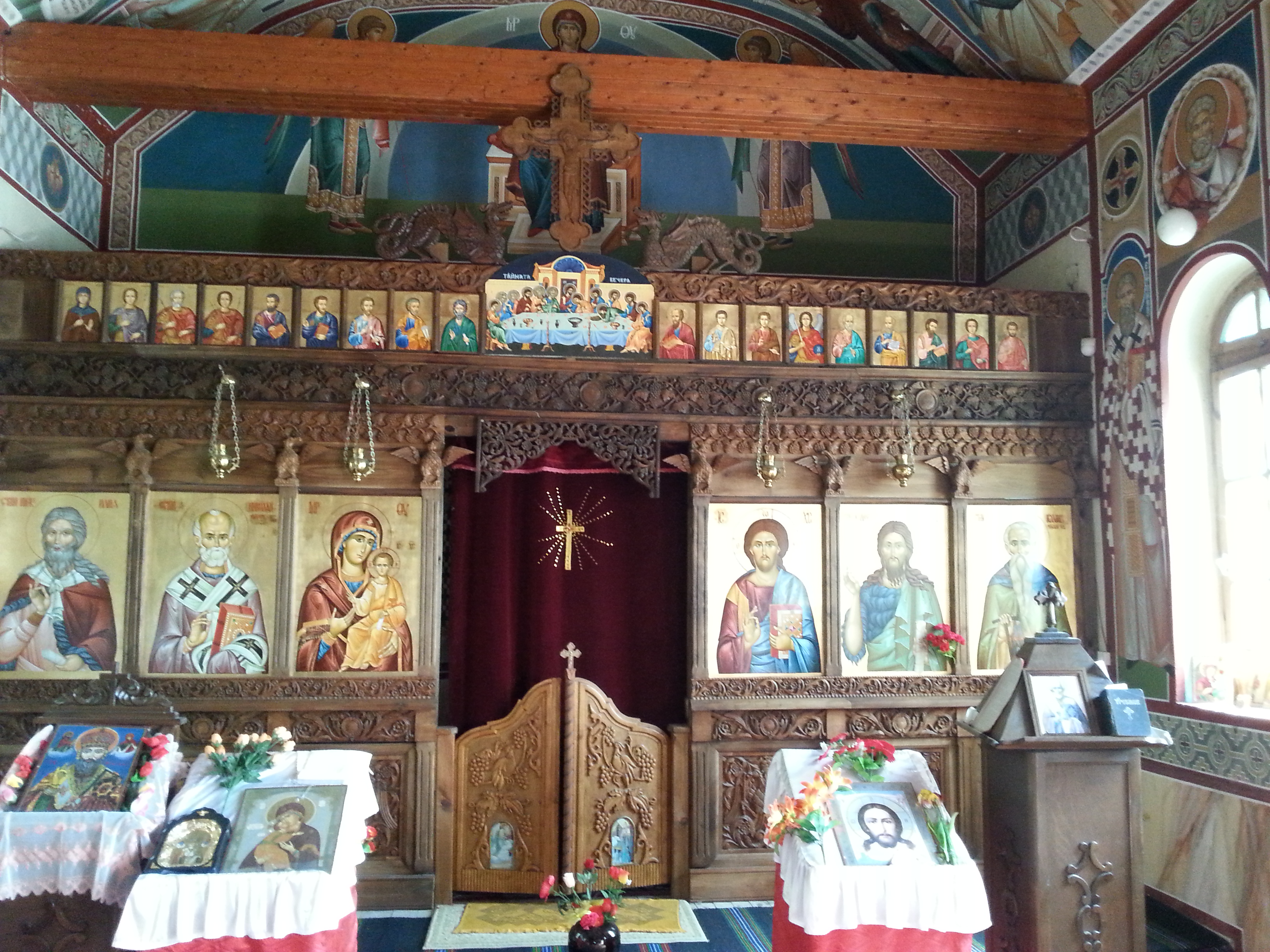

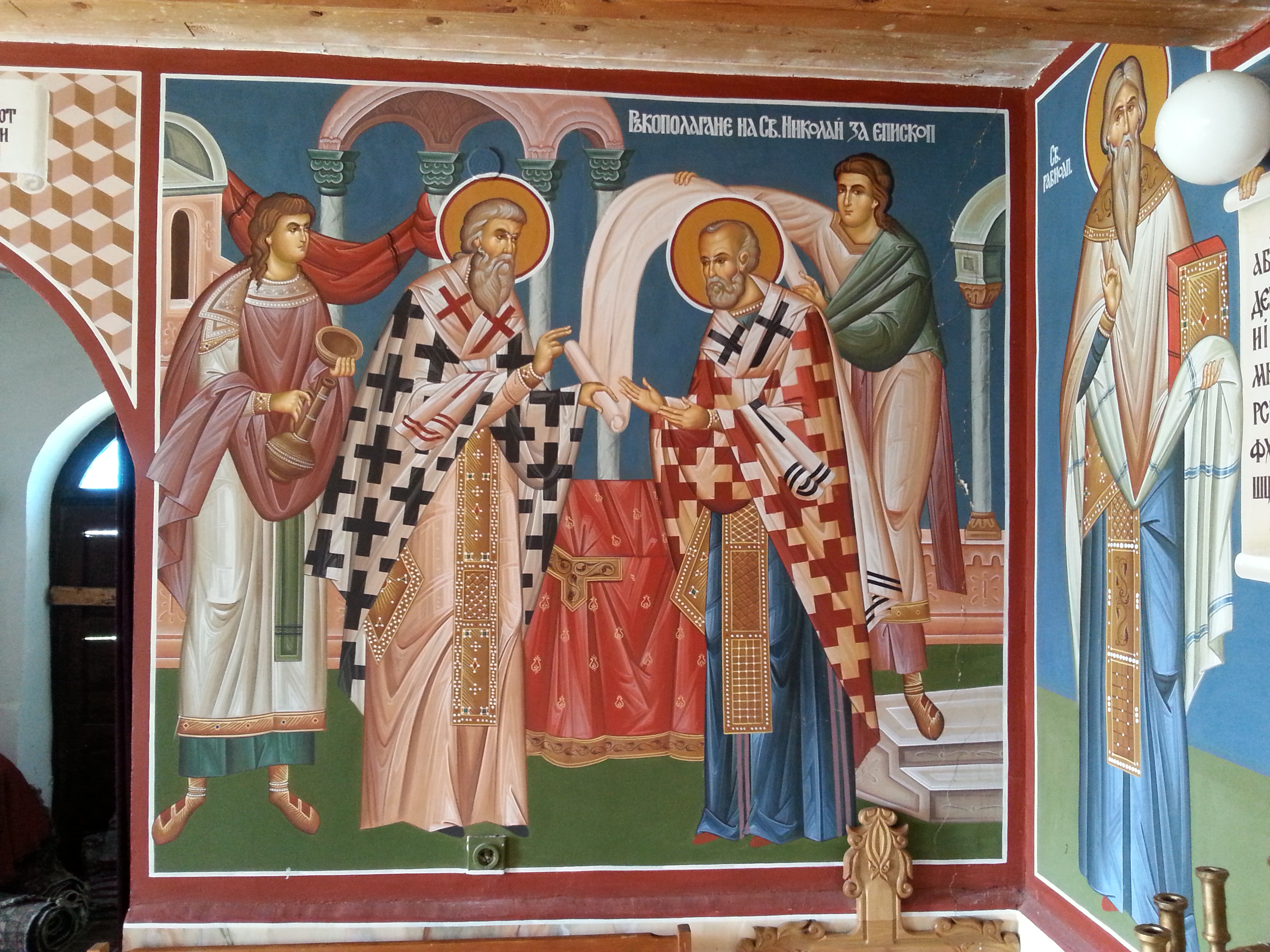

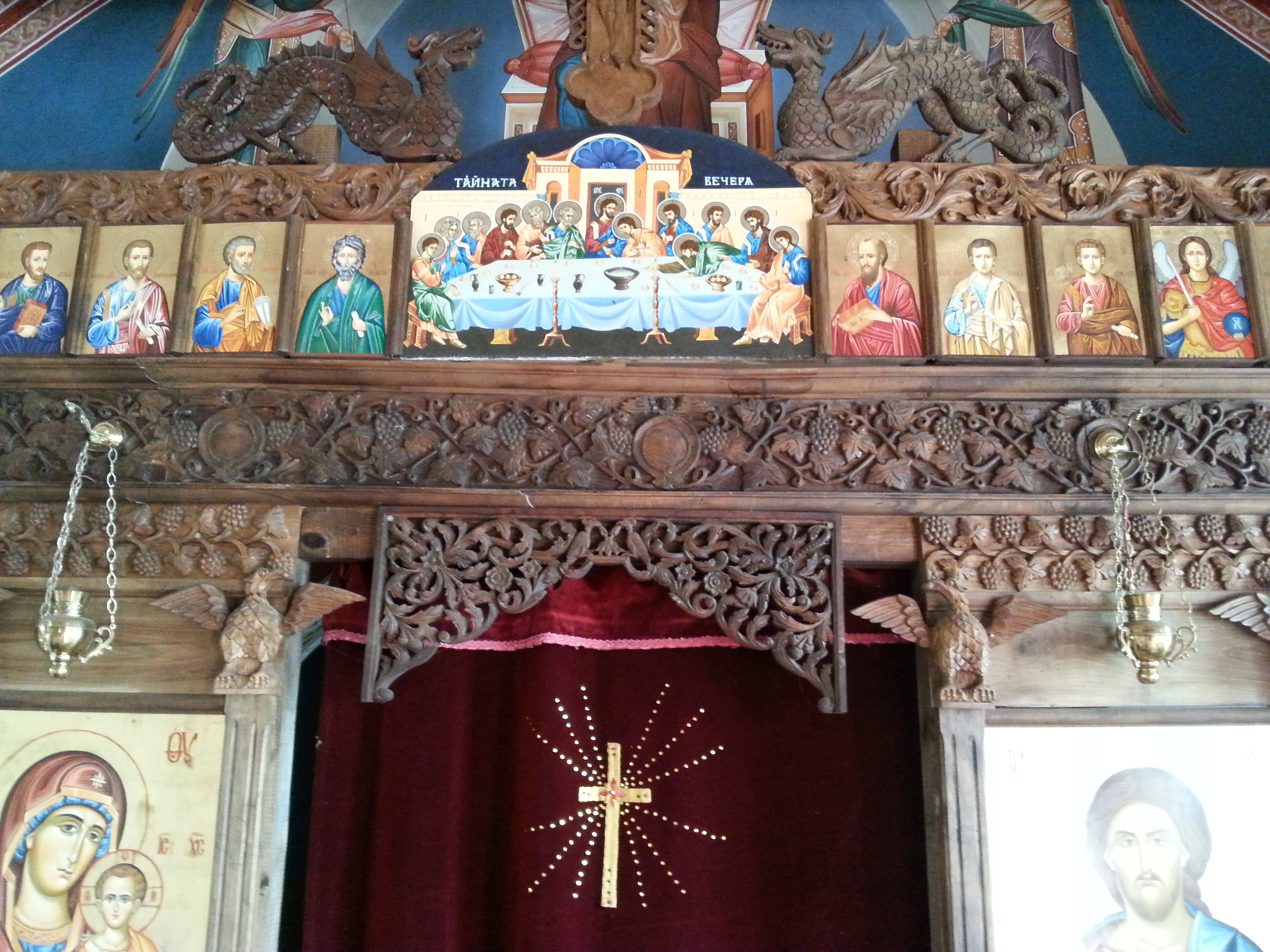
