= I-1 road (Bulgaria) =

Road in Bulgaria

Republic Road I-1
- Републикански път I-1
- I-1 road highlighted in orange

Route information
- Part of E79
- Length: 453.8 km (282.0 mi)

Major junctions
- From: New Europe Bridge; (Romania)
- To: Kulata; (Greece)

Location
- Country: Bulgaria
- Major cities: Vidin, Montana, Vratsa, Botevgrad, Sofia, Pernik, Dupnitsa, Blagoevgrad, Sandanski

Highway system
- Highways in Bulgaria

Republic road I-1 (Bulgarian: Републикански път I-1) is a major road in western Bulgaria. It runs between the New Europe Bridge, at the Danube border with Romania, and the village of Kulata, at the border crossing to Greece. The total length of the road is 453.8 km (282.0 mi). Most of it provides one driving lane per direction and it is planned to be superseded or replaced in all sections by either motorways, or expressways.

== Description ==
Road I-1 begins from New Europe Bridge (Vidin–Calafat Bridge), at the Danube border crossing to Romania, some 5 km from Vidin. The bridge entered in service in June 2013, providing two carriageways with two lane each. Road I-1 bypasses Vidin from west and then goes through the centre of Dimovo. A dual carriage bypass of Montana was inaugurated in 2015. Another bypass, of Vratsa, opened to traffic in July 2014, but providing a single carriageway. Road I-1 runs through the centre of Mezdra and then it bypasses Botevgrad before making connection with Hemus motorway (A2). Botevgrad-Vidin expressway is planned to supersede road I-1 between Botevgrad and Vidin.

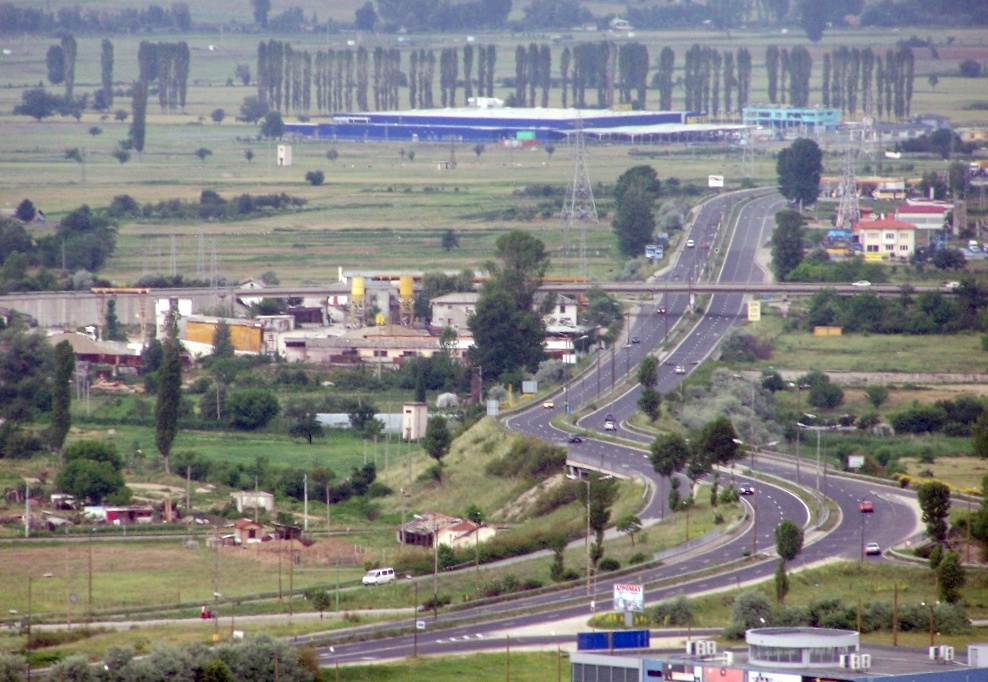
Road I-1 at Blagoevgrad

Through the Balkan Mountains road I-1 runs parallel to Hemus motorway and climbs via the Vitinya Pass. It enters the Sofia Valley and then joins the Sofia ring road in its eastern and southern arcs, providing also access to Trakia motorway (A1). At Knyazhevo neighbourhood, road I-1 turns through the Vladaya Pass. Close to Pernik, at Dragichevo interchange, road I-1 merges into Struma motorway (A3) to the village of Dolna Dikanya. Then, road I-1 runs parallel to the Struma motorway between Dupnitsa and Blagoevgrad, which the road bypasses before entering the picturesque Kresna Gorge. After bypassing Sandanski, between Melnik interchange and the village of Marino pole, road I-1 was demolished and replaced by a section of Struma motorway, which entered in service in 2015. Finally, road I-1 reaches Kulata checkpoint, at the border with Greece.
