= European route E83 =

Road in trans-European E-road network

E83

Major junctions
- East end: Byala
- West end: Botevgrad

Location
- Countries: Bulgaria

Highway system
- International E-road network; A Class; B Class

European route E 83 is a road. It begins in Byala, Bulgaria and ends in Botevgrad, Bulgaria.

The road follows: Byala - Pleven - Yablanitsa - Botevgrad.

== See also ==
- Roads in Bulgaria
- Highways in Bulgaria
