= Bilo Mountains =

Mountain range in Bulgaria

Coordinates: 42°52′N 023°54′E

The Bilo Mountains are a ridge or small range in the Balkan Mountains of western Bulgaria, in Sofia Province. They are located about 50 kilometres (31 mi) northeast of Sofia and about 9 kilometres (6 mi) southwest of Botevgrad, near the town of Pravets. Bilo (Било) in Bulgarian means ridge.
