= Vitinya Pass =

Mountain pass in Bulgaria

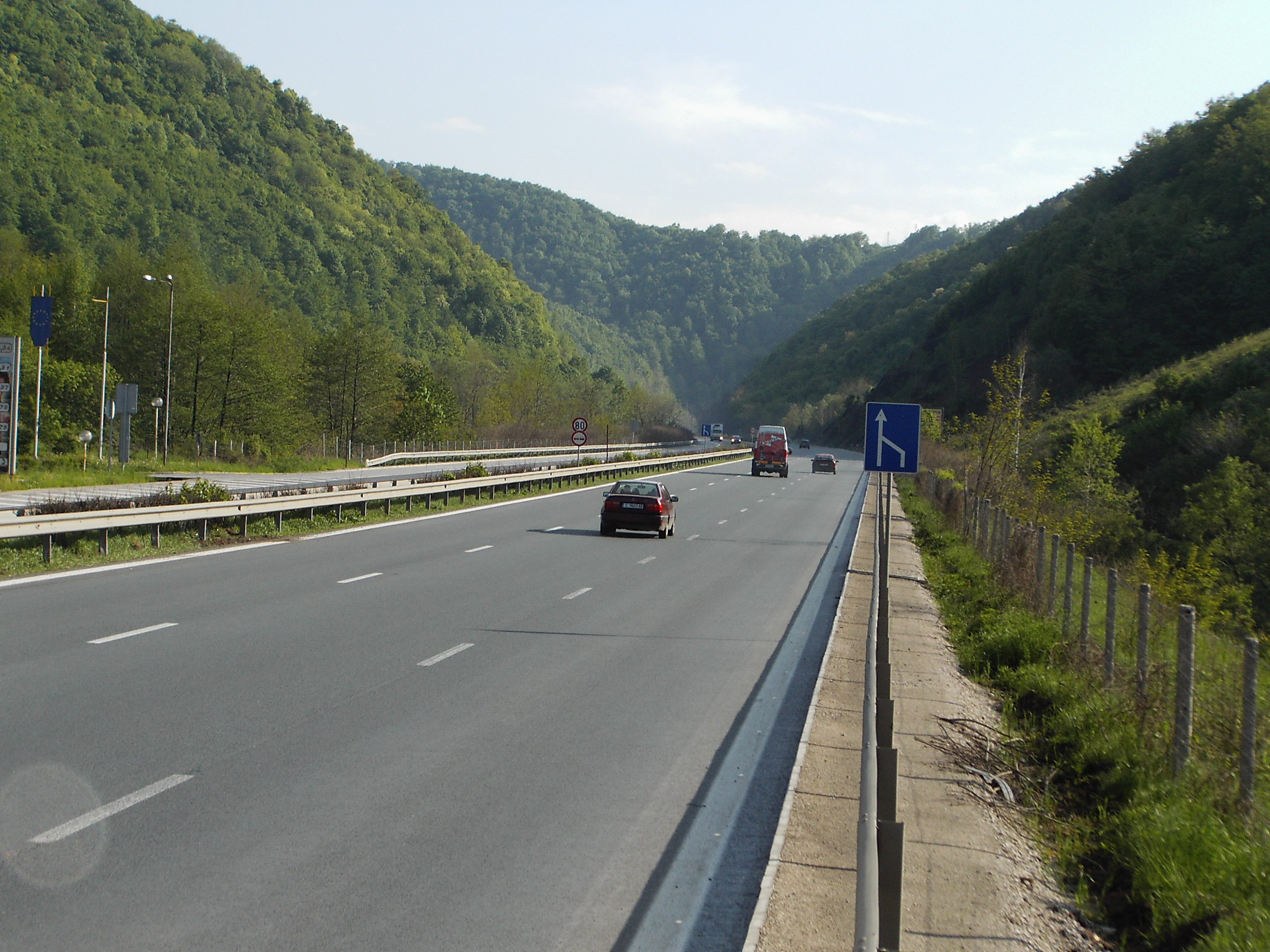
- The Hemus motorway just below Vitinya Pass
- Interactive map of Vitinya Pass
- Elevation: 970 m (3,180 ft)
- Traversed by: I-1 road

Location
- Location: Bulgaria
- Range: Balkan Mountains
- Coordinates: 42°46′53″N 23°47′58″E

Vitinya Pass (Bulgarian: Витиня) is a mountain pass in the Balkan Mountains (Stara Planina) in Bulgaria. It connects Sofia and Botevgrad.

The Hemus motorway passes it in a tunnel just below the summit. The motorway includes a notable girder bridge called the Bebresh Viaduct.
