= Batultsi =

Batultsi Батулци
- Village
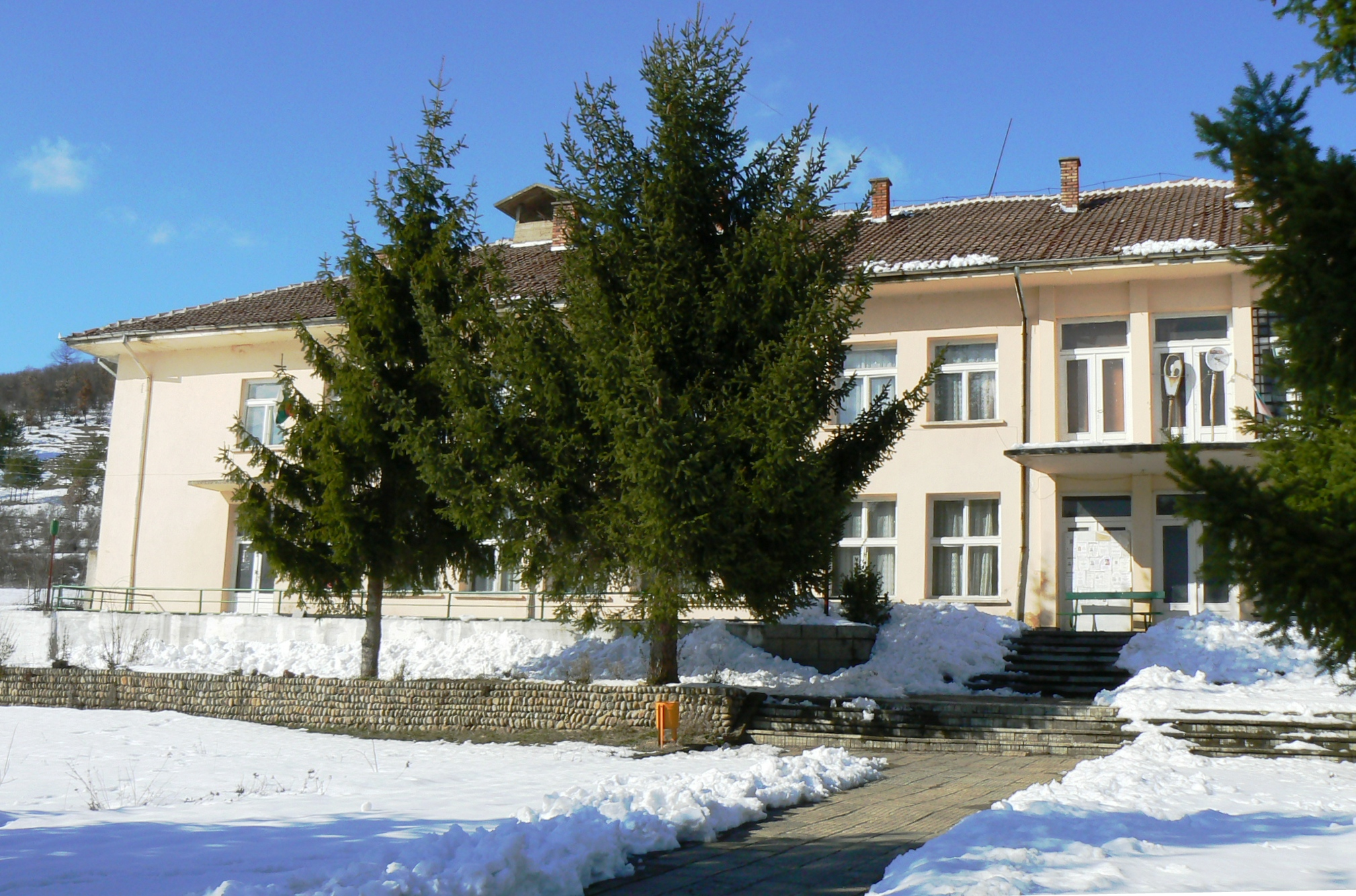
- Village post office

- Location within Bulgaria
- Coordinates: 43.0833°N 24.0000°E
- Country: Bulgaria
- Province: Lovech Province
- Municipality: Yablanitsa
- Time zone: UTC+2 (EET)
  - Summer (DST): UTC+3 (EEST)

Batultsi is a village in Yablanitsa Municipality, Lovech Province, northern Bulgaria.
