= Dabravata =

Village in Lovech Province, Bulgaria

Dabravata Дъбравата
- Village
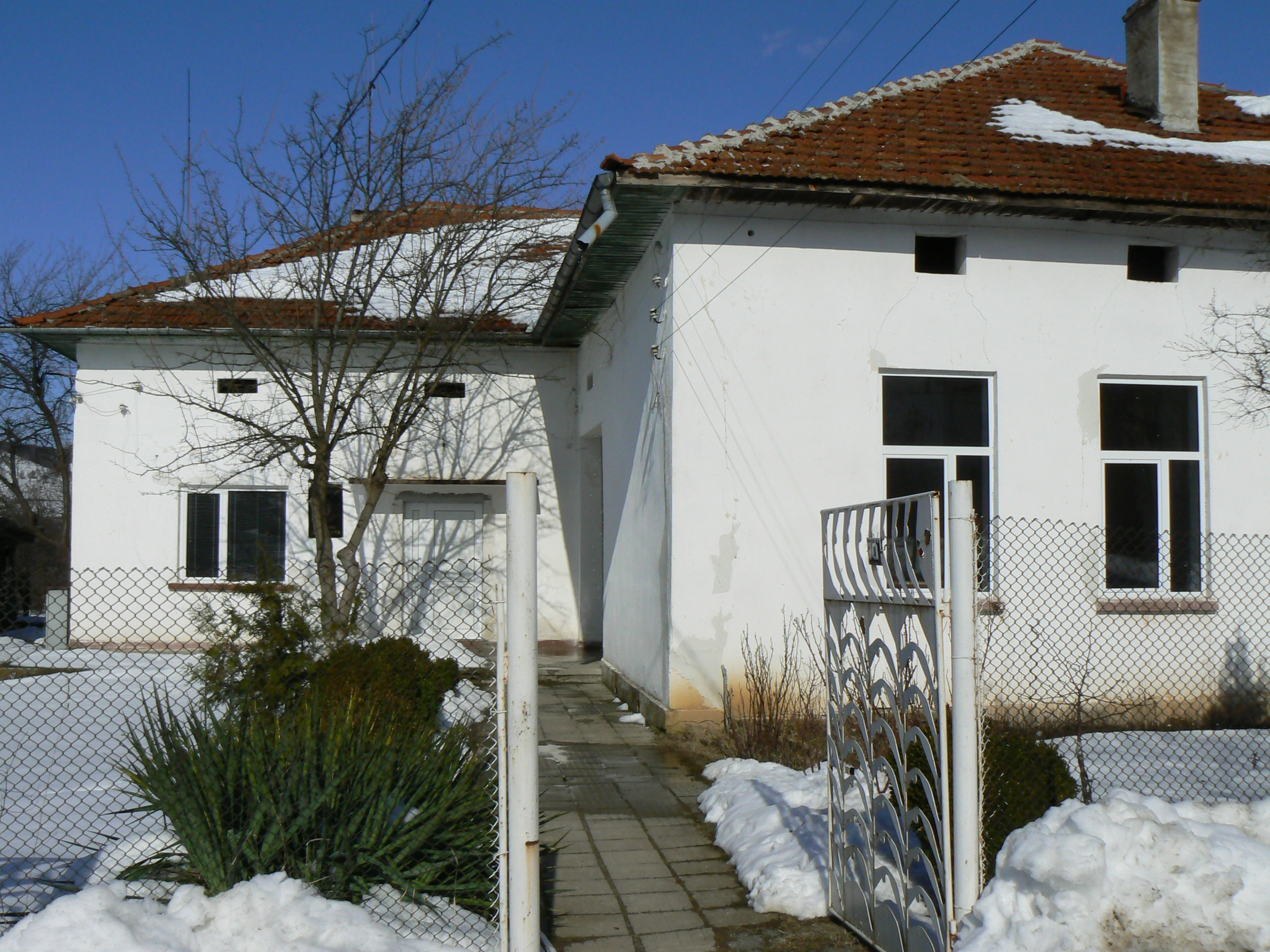
- Mayor's office

- Location within Bulgaria
- Coordinates: 43.0667°N 23.9833°E
- Country: Bulgaria
- Province: Lovech Province
- Municipality: Yablanitsa
- Time zone: UTC+2 (EET)
  - Summer (DST): UTC+3 (EEST)

Dabravata (Bulgarian: Дъбравата) is a village in Yablanitsa Municipality, Lovech Province, northern Bulgaria.
