= Brestnitsa, Lovech Province =

Brestnitsa Брестница
- Village
- Location within Bulgaria
- Coordinates: 43.0667°N 24.1833°E
- Country: Bulgaria
- Province: Lovech Province
- Municipality: Yablanitsa
- Time zone: UTC+2 (EET)
  - Summer (DST): UTC+3 (EEST)

Brestnitsa is a village in Yablanitsa Municipality, Lovech Province, northern Bulgaria.
