= Malak Izvor, Haskovo Province =

Malak Izvor
- Village
- Location within Bulgaria
- Coordinates: 41°47′N 25°44′E
- Country: Bulgaria
- Province: Haskovo Province
- Municipality: Stambolovo
- Time zone: UTC+2 (EET)
  - Summer (DST): UTC+3 (EEST)

Malak Izvor is a village in Stambolovo Municipality, in Haskovo Province, in southern Bulgaria.
