= Hemus motorway =

Motorway in Bulgaria

Coordinates: 43.32244°N 26.69874°E

Hemus motorway
- Автомагистрала „Хемус“
- Hemus motorway highlighted in red and yellow

Route information
- Part of E70, E83, E772
- Length: 418 km (260 mi) 206 km (128 mi) built 51 km (32 mi) under construction

Major junctions
- From: Sofia
- To: Varna (not constructed from Ugarchin near Dermantsi to Buhovtsi near Targovishte)

Location
- Country: Bulgaria
- Major cities: Botevgrad, Shumen (future: Pleven, Lovech, Veliko Tarnovo and Targovishte)

Highway system
- Highways in Bulgaria

The Hemus motorway (Bulgarian: Автомагистрала „Хемус“, Avtomagistrala "Hemus") or Haemus motorway, designated A2, is a partially built motorway in Bulgaria, under construction since 1974. Its planned length is 418 km, of which 206 km are in operation as of December 2025. The motorway in operation is divided into two sections — the first one links the capital Sofia with the town of Ugarchin near Dermantsi, crossing Stara planina (Balkan Mountains), and the second segment connects Varna and Buhovtsi near Targovishte. According to the plans, Hemus motorway would connect Sofia with the third-largest city of Varna, at the Black Sea coast, duplicating European route E70 (Varna–Shumen), European route E772 (Shumen–Yablanitsa) and European route E83 (Yablanitsa–Sofia).

== History ==
=== October 4, 1974 ===
The construction of the motorway officially began. The groundbreaking ceremony was attended by the First Secretary of the Bulgarian Communist Party (BCP), Todor Zhivkov.

=== 1999 ===
The Pravets–Yablanitsa section of the Hemus motorway was officially opened on 5 December 1999. Due to the mountainous terrain through the Balkans, the 5.47 km section together with another 16 km reconstructed, features two viaducts and one tunnel (Praveshki hanove), while the whole Sofia–Yablanitsa section has three more tunnels. The construction of the Pravets–Yablanitsa section began in 1984 but ceased in the late 1980s due to lack of funds to eventually be finished in 1998–1999.

=== 2005 ===
The 12.8 km section connecting Shumen with Kaspichan to the east was opened on 30 December 2005 and cost 77.6 million leva.

=== 2013 ===
- In July 2013 a segment of the motorway at Shumen opened.
- In August 2013 a 8.46 km segment, connecting the Sofia Ring Road and the Yana junction, opened to traffic.

=== 2015 ===
In August 2015, a 4.9 km segment, including the Belokopitovo interchange (with I-2 road), was inaugurated.

=== 2019 ===
In October 2019, а 9.3 km segment (lot 0), connecting Yablanitsa with the I-4 road near the Boaza ravine of Vit, was inaugurated.

=== 2022 ===
In October 2022, а 16.3 km segment (lot 10), connecting Belokopitovo with the village of Buhovtsi near Targovishte, was inaugurated.

=== 2025 ===
In October 2025, а 10 km segment of lot 1, connecting Boaza with the village of Dermantsi near Lukovit, was inaugurated. Two months later, on December 13th, the remaining 5 kilometers of lot 1, stretching from Dermantsi to a temporary exit on the III-307 road near Ugarchin, were opened.

=== Recent Developments ===
In January 2013 National Company "Strategic Infrastructure Projects" (NCSIP), a state-run company, tendered feasibility study for the remaining sections of Hemus motorway (Yablanitsa-Panayot Volovo). In 2014 NCSIP signed contracts for drawing conceptual designs for all 8 lots of the motorway. In January 2015, a tender for design and build of 2 lots, between Yablanitsa and the Pleven/Lovech road, has been announced by NCSIP. In 2016 NCSIP was closed, with all activities being transferred to the Roads Agency. The tender for construction of the Yablanitsa - Pleven/Lovech road was cancelled due to lack of secured financing and later in 2016 a new tender for a shorter 9 km stretch between Yablanitsa and Boaza has been announced.

== Exits ==
Exit	km	Destinations	Lanes	Notes
	0	Sofia Ring Road		In service
	1.4	Dolni Bogrov		In service
	8.4	Yana		In service
	21.7	Potop		In service
	30.2	Vitinya		In service
	33	Vitinya (1195 m)		In service
	35.2	Vitiska reka		In service
	39.6	Topli Dol (883 m)		In service
	42	Echemishka (775 m)		In service
	47	Botevgrad		In service
	52.7	Pravets		In service
	54.7	Praveshki Hanove (871 m)		In service
	60.4	Osikovska Lakavitsa		In service
	67.8	Dzhurovo		In service
	74.6	Yablanitsa		In service
	78.5	Prelog		In service
	87.8	Boaza (only towards Sofia)		In service
	88.5	Boaza		In service
	98.1	Dermantsi		In service
	102.8	Ugarchin (temporary exit)		In service
	115.6	Ugarchin		Under construction
	121.8	Kalenik		Under construction
	139.3	Pleven, Lovech		Under construction
	153.1	Drenov		Under construction
	167.6	Letnitsa		Under construction
	171.5	Krushuna		Under construction
	190	Butovo		Under construction
	195.3	Pavlikeni		Tender
	204.8	Daskot		Tender
	222.7	Polikraishte, Veliko Tarnovo		Tender
	265.6	Kovachevsko kale		Planned
	299	Loznitsa		Under construction
	310.9	Buhovtsi		In service
	327.2	Belokopitovo		In service
	338	Shumen-east		In service
	348.6	Kaspichan, Novi Pazar		In service
	357	Nevsha		In service
	361.8	Mlada Gvardiya		In service
	372	Provadia-north (road III-208)		In service
	380.3	Provadia-east, Gabarnitsa		In service
	387.3	Devnya		In service
	392.5	Povelyanovo		In service
	398	Slanchevo		In service
	408	Varna Airport		In service
	418	Varna-west		In service

== Miscellaneous ==
- Bebresh Viaduct, regarded as the highest motorway bridge in the Balkans with a clearance of 120 m, is part of the Hemus motorway.
- The motorway is named after the Haemus Mons, an ancient name of the Balkan Mountains (Stara Planina).

== Gallery ==
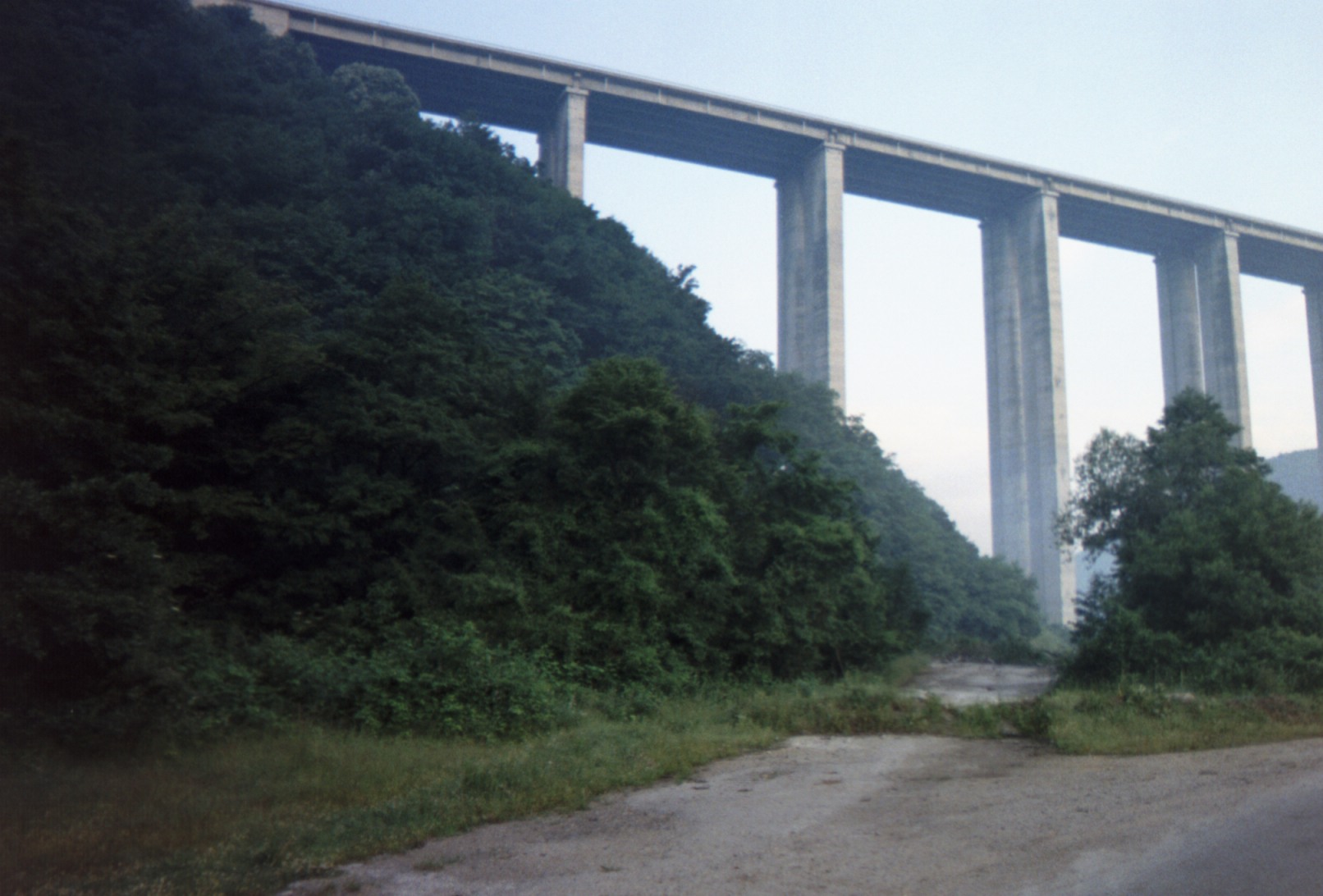
The Bebresh Viaduct north of the Vitinya Pass

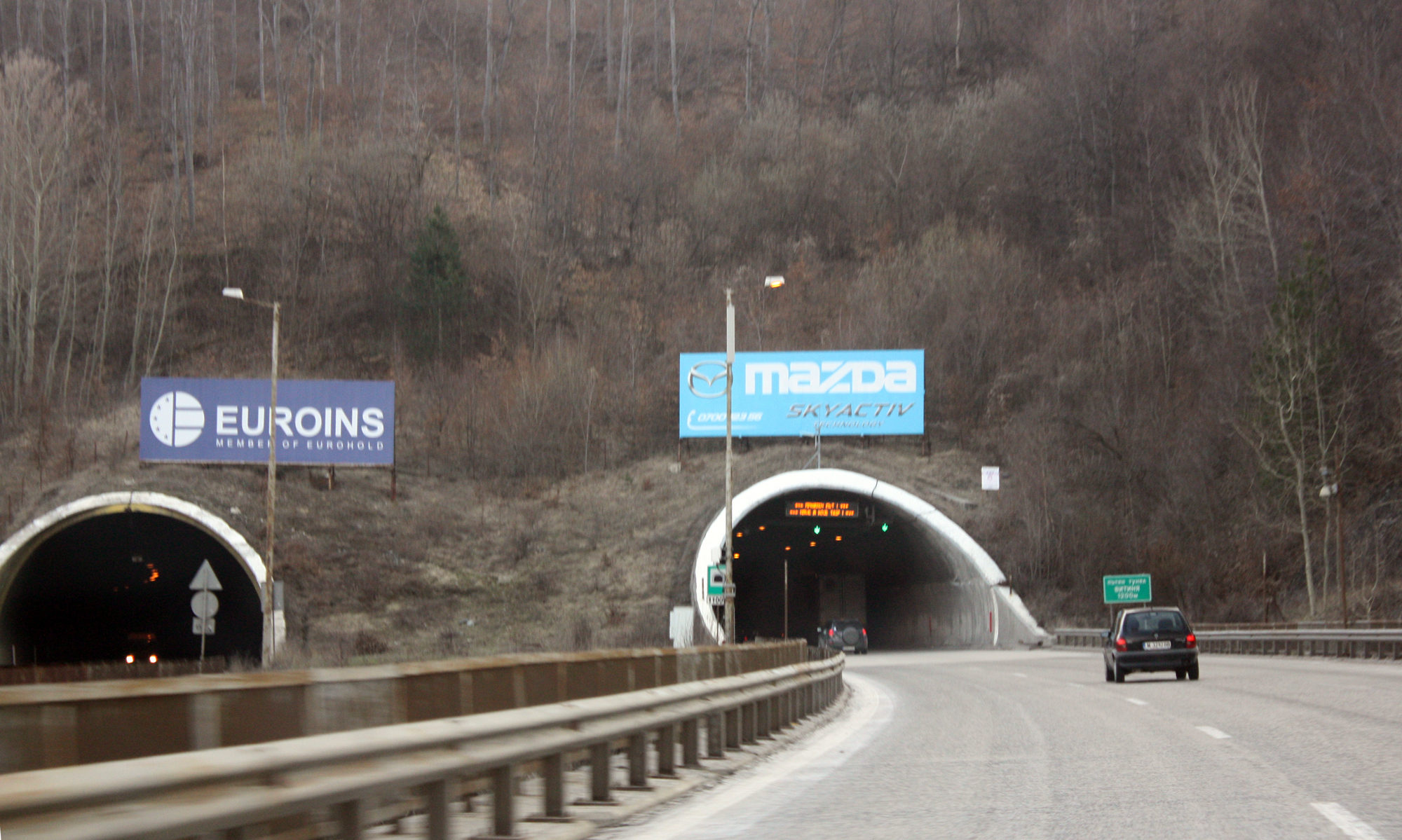
Vitinya Tunnel on A-2 Hemus Motorway, Bulgaria

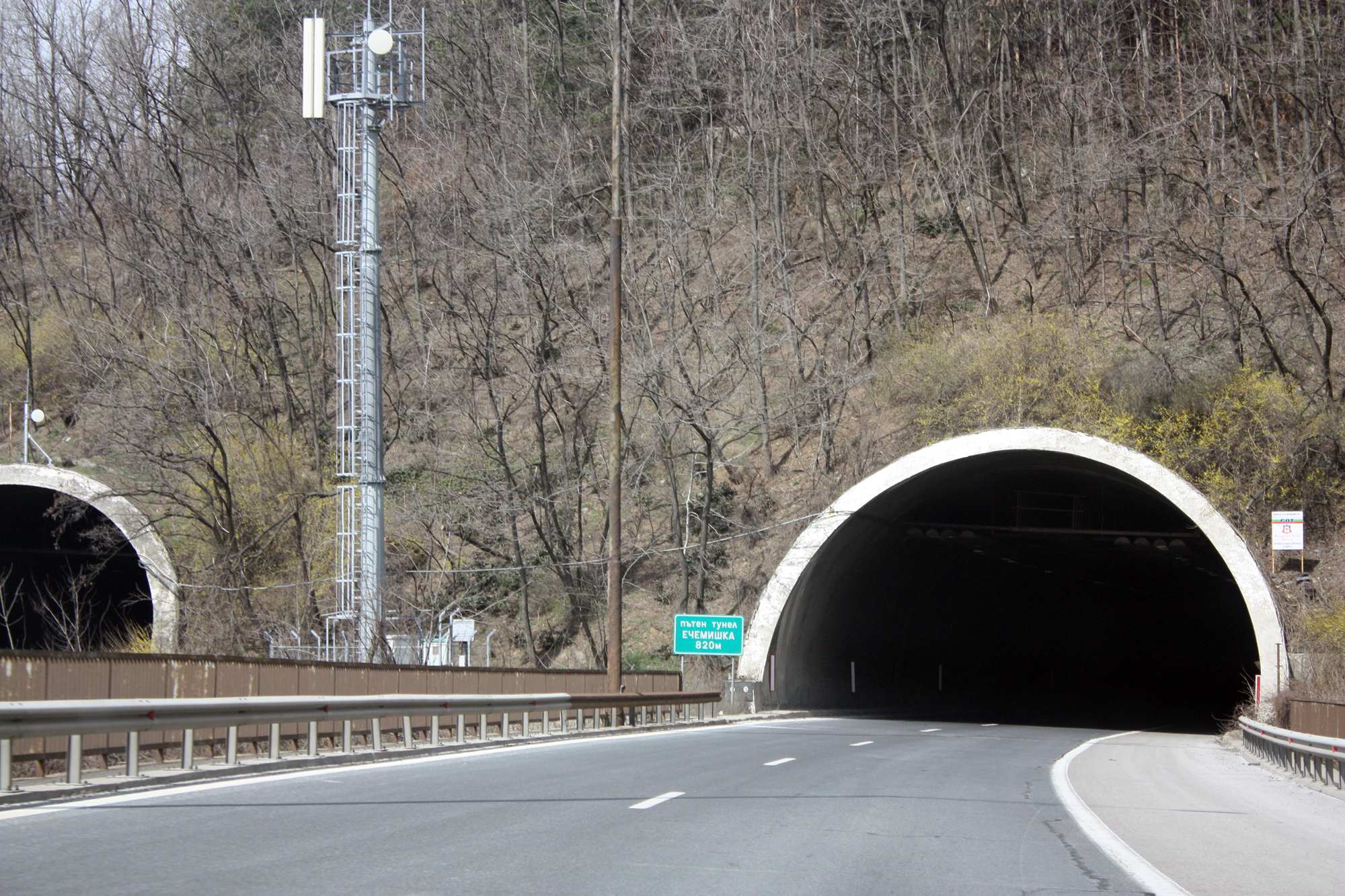
Echemishka Tunnel on A-2 Hemus Motorway, Bulgaria

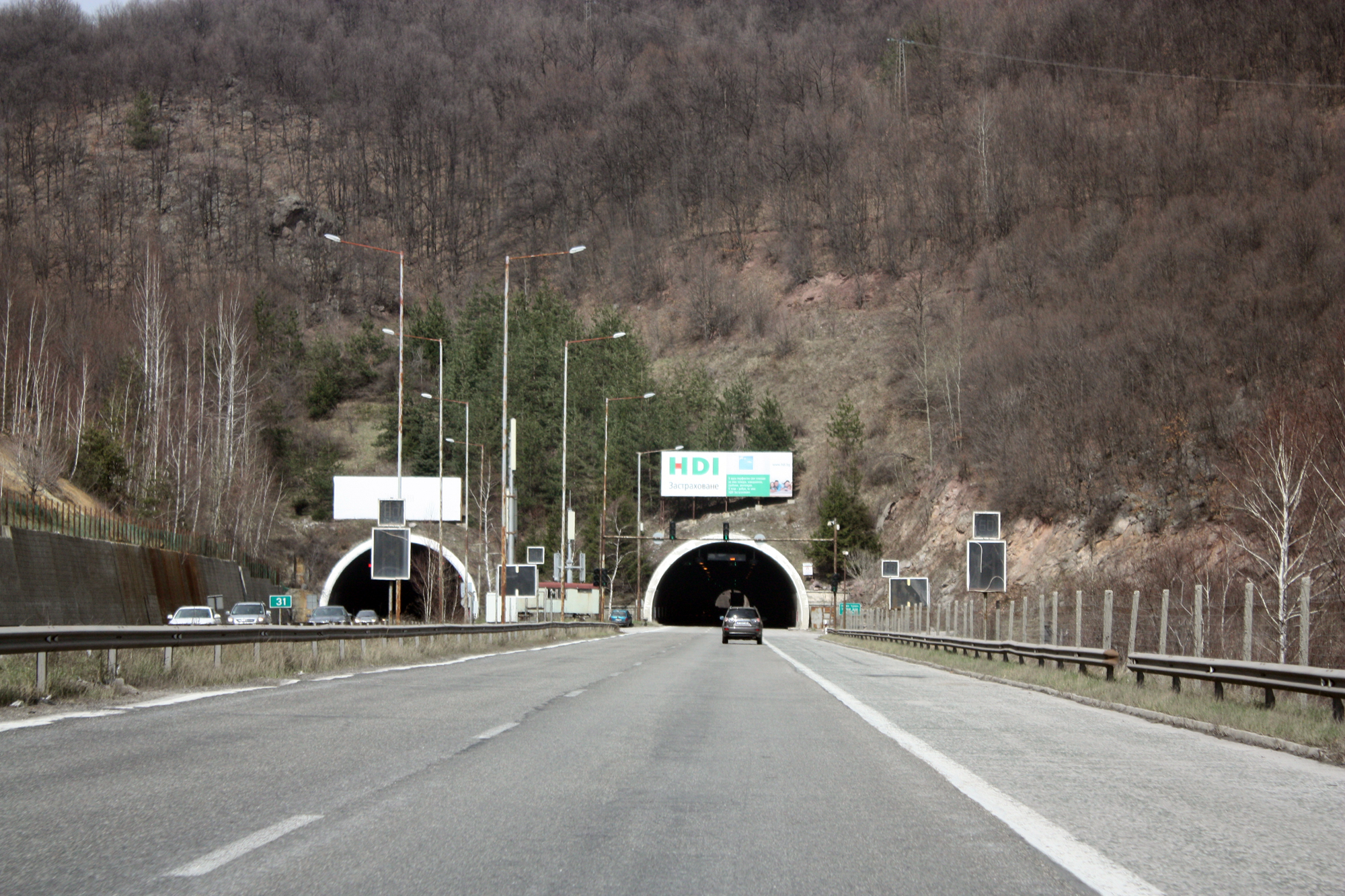
Topli Dol Tunnel on A-2 Hemus Motorway, Bulgaria
