= Malak Izvor, Lovech Province =

Malak Izvor Малък извор
- Village
- Location within Bulgaria
- Coordinates: 42.9833°N 24.1333°E
- Country: Bulgaria
- Province: Lovech Province
- Municipality: Yablanitsa
- Time zone: UTC+2 (EET)
  - Summer (DST): UTC+3 (EEST)

Malak Izvor is a village in Yablanitsa Municipality, Lovech Province, northern Bulgaria.
