= Botevgrad =

Town in the province of Sofia, Bulgaria

Botevgrad Ботевград
- Town
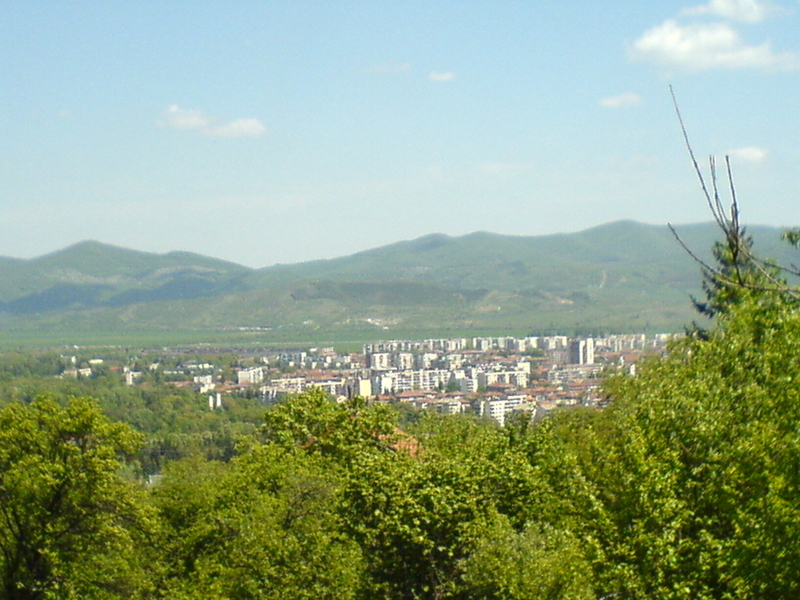
- View of Botevgrad from the Chekanitsa area

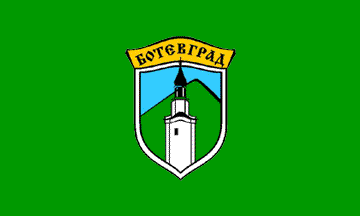
- Flag Coat of arms
- Etymology: Named after Hristo Botev
- Location of Botevgrad Botevgrad (Balkans) Botevgrad (Europe)
- Coordinates: 42°54′30″N 23°47′31″E
- Country: Bulgaria
- Province: Sofia
- Municipality: Botevgrad

Government
  - Mayor: Tonislav Toniev (GDBOP)

Area
  - Total: 53,298 km^{2} (20,578 sq mi)
- Elevation: 395 m (1,296 ft)

Population (2022)
  - Total: 20,602
  - Density: 0.38654/km^{2} (1.0011/sq mi)
- Time zone: UTC+2 (EET)
  - Summer (DST): UTC+3 (EEST)
- Postal Code: 2140
- Area code: 723
- Website: www.botevgrad.org

Botevgrad (Bulgarian: Ботевград [ˈbɔtevɡrat]) is a town in western Bulgaria. It is located in Botevgrad Municipality of Sofia Province and is close to Pravets. Botevgrad lies 47 km from Sofia.

== History and name ==
The village was called Samundzhievo (Самунджиево) until it was elevated to town status at the end of 1865 under the name of Orhanie (Bulgarian language: Орхание; Ottoman Turkish: اورخانيه). On 1 December 1934 the town was named Botevgrad (Ботевград) after Hristo Botev.

== Geography ==
Botevgrad and its hinterland are located in an elliptical valley with a total area of 150 km^{2} called the Botevgrad Valley. The municipality covers parts of the Western Balkan Mountains — Rzhana, Murgash, Bilo and Golyama Planina and some parts of the Northern Balkan. Vitinya Pass connecting Northern Bulgaria with Southern Bulgaria and the proximity of the capital contribute to its strategic location. Botevgrad Municipality borders the following municipalities: Pravets, Etropole, Gorna Malina, Elin Pelin, Svoge, Mezdra and Roman.

=== Climate ===
Climate data for Botevgrad, Bulgaria
Month	Jan	Feb	Mar	Apr	May	Jun	Jul	Aug	Sep	Oct	Nov	Dec	Year
Record high °C (°F)	18.8 (65.8)	22.9 (73.2)	33 (91)	30 (86)	35.5 (95.9)	37.7 (99.9)	38.5 (101.3)	41.2 (106.2)	41 (106)	34.6 (94.3)	26.8 (80.2)	21 (70)	41.2 (106.2)
Mean daily maximum °C (°F)	4.6 (40.3)	6.7 (44.1)	11.5 (52.7)	17.8 (64.0)	22.4 (72.3)	26.1 (79.0)	29.2 (84.6)	29.6 (85.3)	25.1 (77.2)	18.5 (65.3)	12.4 (54.3)	6.1 (43.0)	17.6 (63.7)
Daily mean °C (°F)	0.0 (32.0)	2.1 (35.8)	6.4 (43.5)	12.3 (54.1)	17.1 (62.8)	20.4 (68.7)	22.7 (72.9)	22.5 (72.5)	19.1 (66.4)	12.9 (55.2)	7.6 (45.7)	2.5 (36.5)	12.2 (54.0)
Mean daily minimum °C (°F)	−4.6 (23.7)	−3.1 (26.4)	1.1 (34.0)	6.7 (44.1)	10.8 (51.4)	13.8 (56.8)	16.0 (60.8)	15.7 (60.3)	12.3 (54.1)	7.2 (45.0)	3.1 (37.6)	−1.5 (29.3)	6.5 (43.7)
Record low °C (°F)	−31.9 (−25.4)	−29.5 (−21.1)	−25.4 (−13.7)	−4.3 (24.3)	−0.8 (30.6)	4.3 (39.7)	6.2 (43.2)	5.7 (42.3)	−1.2 (29.8)	−4.3 (24.3)	−12.8 (9.0)	−22.5 (−8.5)	−31.9 (−25.4)
Average precipitation mm (inches)	45 (1.8)	38 (1.5)	49 (1.9)	67 (2.6)	104 (4.1)	117 (4.6)	84 (3.3)	60 (2.4)	60 (2.4)	58 (2.3)	57 (2.2)	48 (1.9)	787 (31.0)
Source: Stringmeteo.com

== Nature ==
The region of Botevgrad municipality is quite rich in natural resources. The geographic landscape is remarkable for its variety. The municipality covers the following geographic areas: a part of Botevgrad Valley, some parts of Botevgradski Predbalkan and four of the Balkan shoulders — Razhana, Golyama Planina, Murgash and Bilo. Kotlovinata Zhleba (Fillet Hollow) is situated between the main Balkan Range and the Northern Balkan.

The bottom of the hollow is the accumulative river terrace of Bebresh river and its tributaries. The low oval hills inside the hollow contribute to the countryside variety. Mount Murgash — 1687 m tall is the highest point of the highest mountain range to the south and south-west. Many rivulets run down the slopes of the heights. Prohoda Vitinya or Vitinya Pass connecting South Bulgaria with North Bulgaria is located on the territory of Botevgrad municipality.

== Economy ==
Sensata Technologies group, which specialises in the design and production of added value electronics and electromechanical systems used in the automotive and consumer electronics industry, operates one large production plant in the town.

GE Pharmaceuticals operates a drugs factory and in 2006 Siemens opened a plant for the production of high voltage transformers.

Integrated Micro-Electronics, Inc., also known as IMI, is a provider of electronics manufacturing services (EMS) and power semiconductor assembly and test services (SATS).

APS Advanced Printing Systems is a company involved in production of thermal printer mechanisms, controller boards and thermal printers.

Mikroak Ltd, Chavdar many other companies in and around the area of Botevgrad.

== Sport ==
Botevgrad has one of the leading basketball teams in the country, BC Balkan Botevgrad, who play at the Arena Botevgrad and have won 8 national championships and 4 national cups. The local football club is called PFC Balkan Botevgrad and plays at the Hristo Botev Stadium. The city has many sports fields - both for football and basketball. Other sports are also very popular - volleyball, swimming, chess, acrobatics and tennis.

== Religion ==
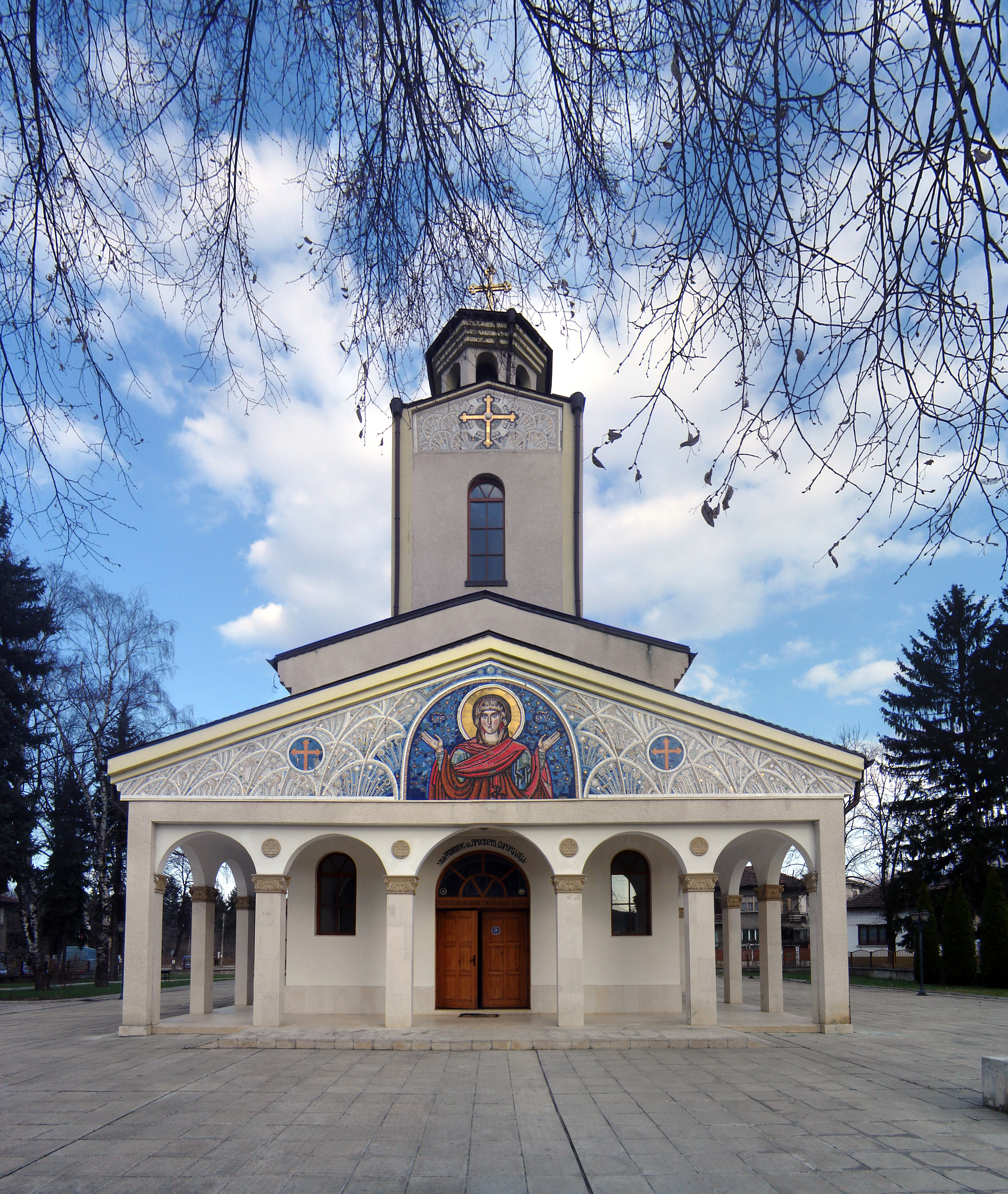
Dormition of the Mother of God Church

The religious buildings in Botevgrad are:

- Church of the Ascension of Christ
- Dormition of the Mother of God Church
- Monastery "Nativity of the Mother of God" in the Zelin village zone
- United Methodist Church

== Twin towns ==
Botevgrad is twinned with:

- Saransk, Russia
- Holbæk, Denmark

== Gallery ==
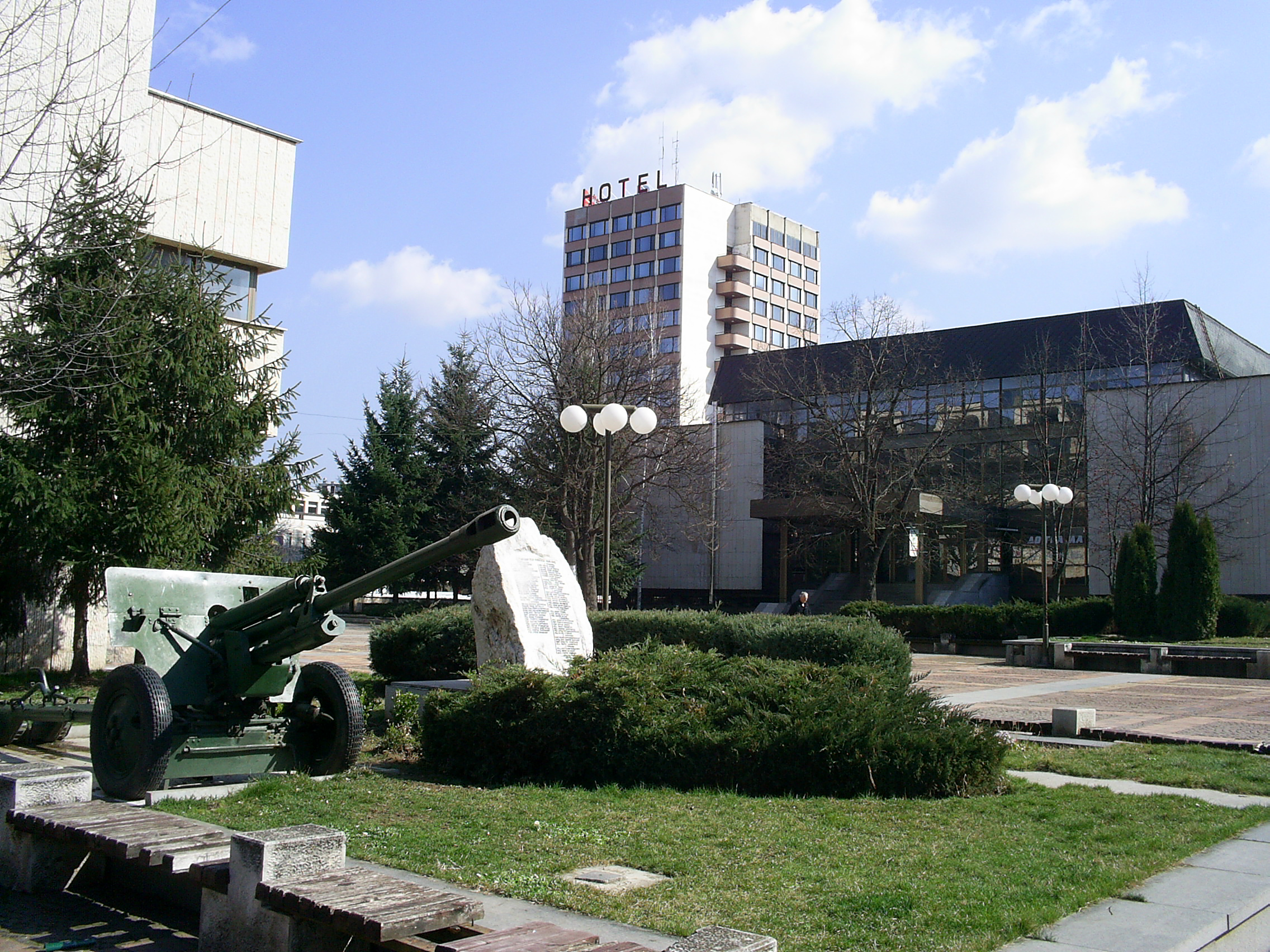
Central Botevgrad

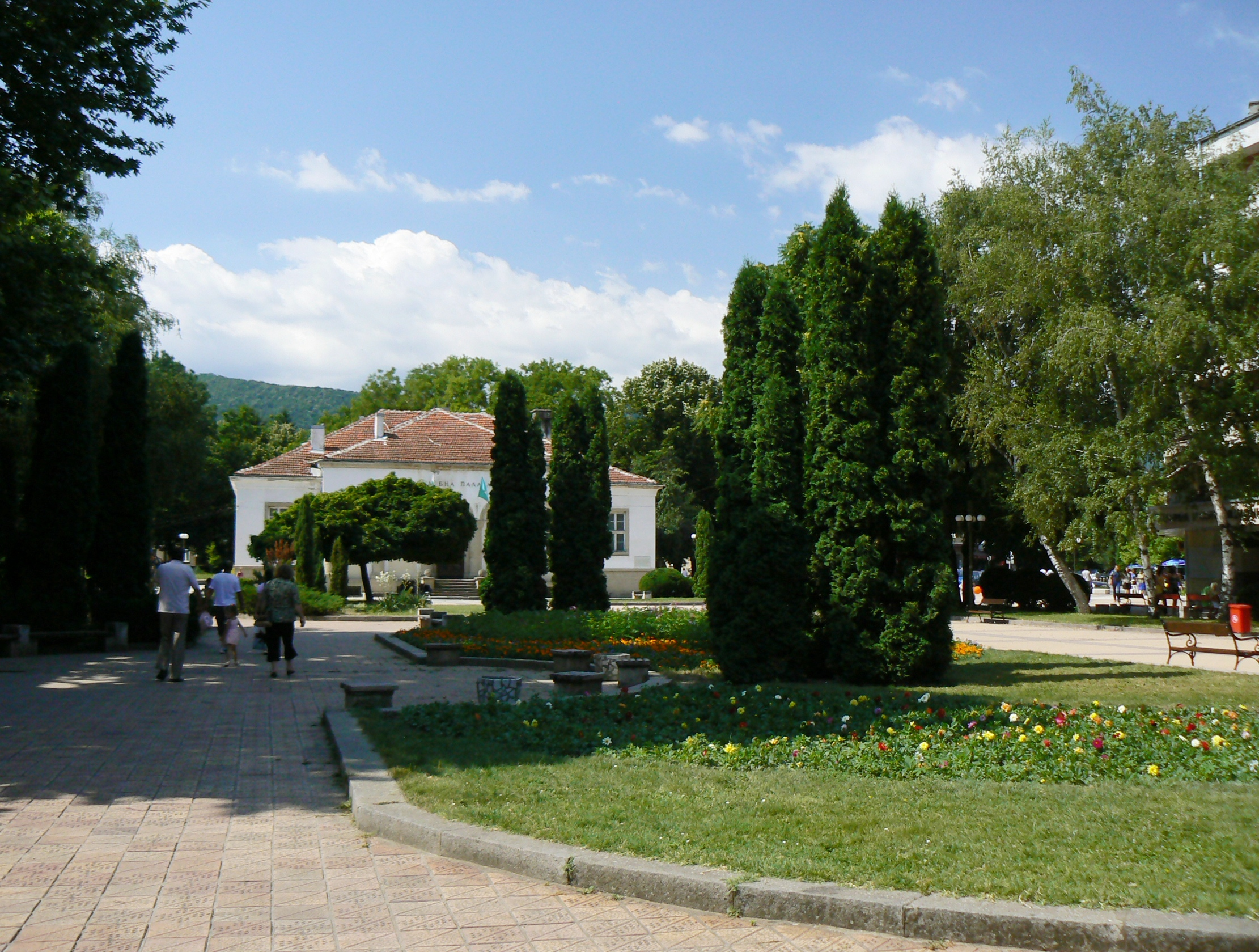
Court Hall and garden

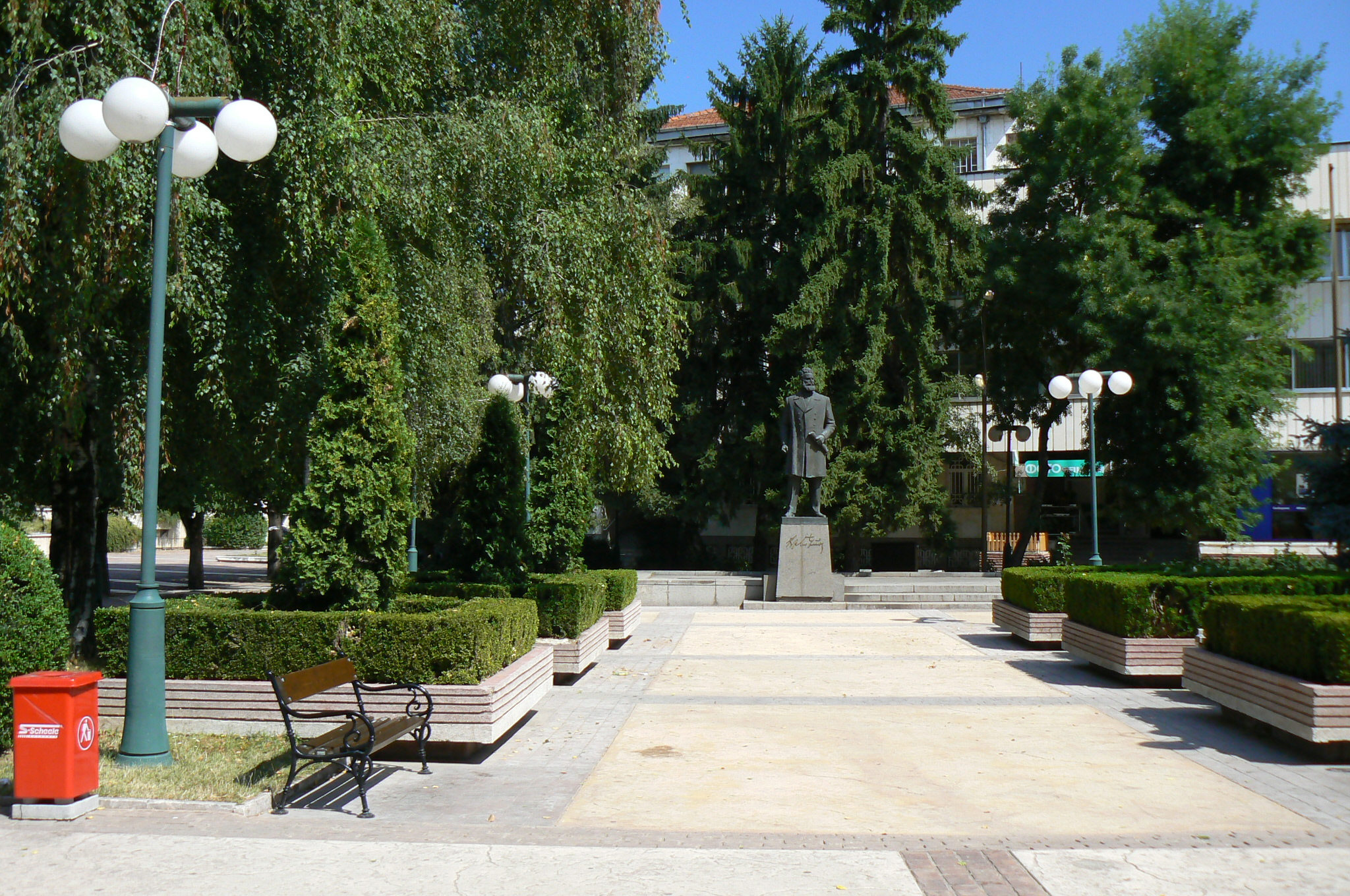
Botev monument and garden

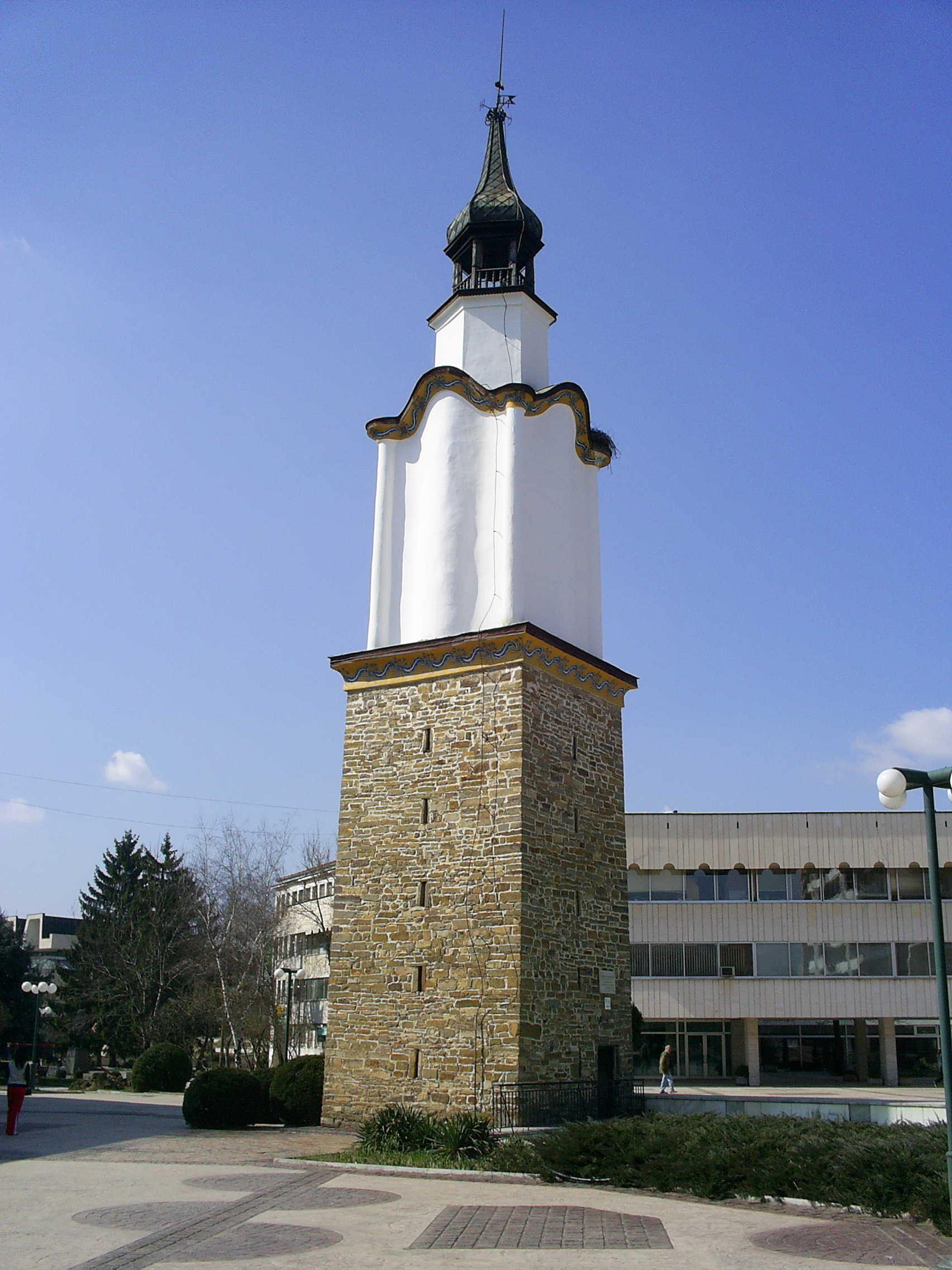
Clock Tower

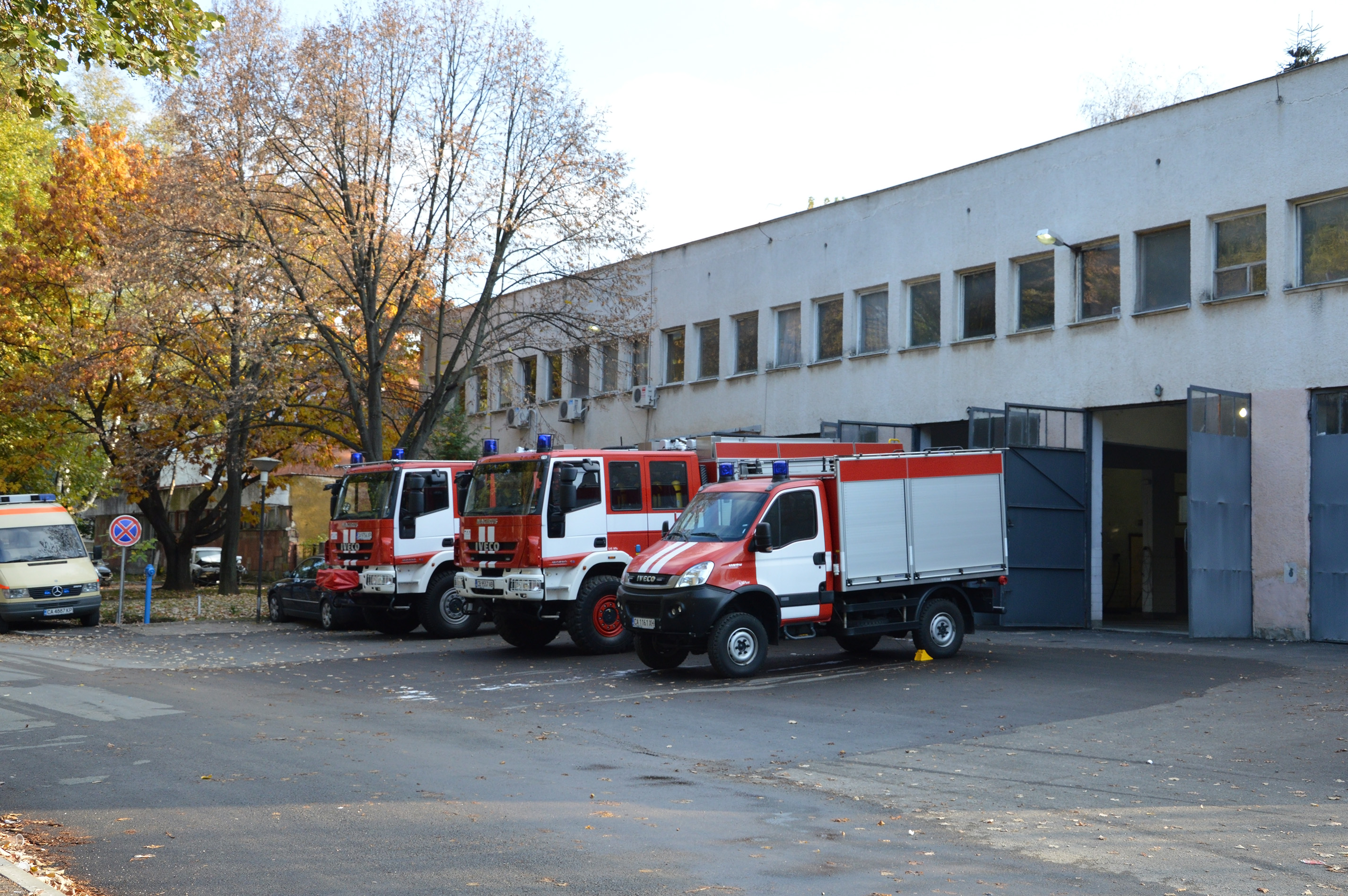
Fire trucks of the fire service

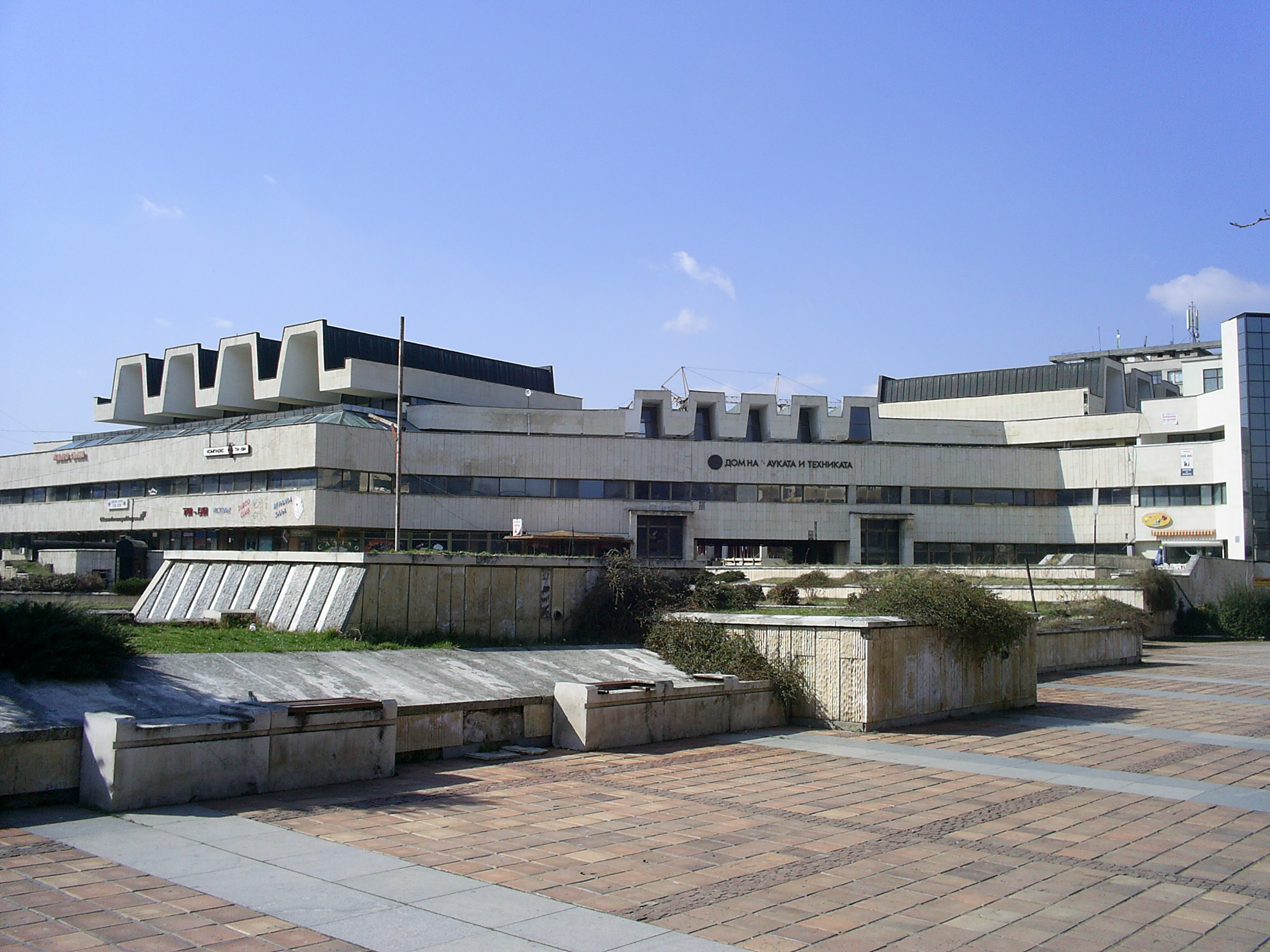
Botevgrad house of science

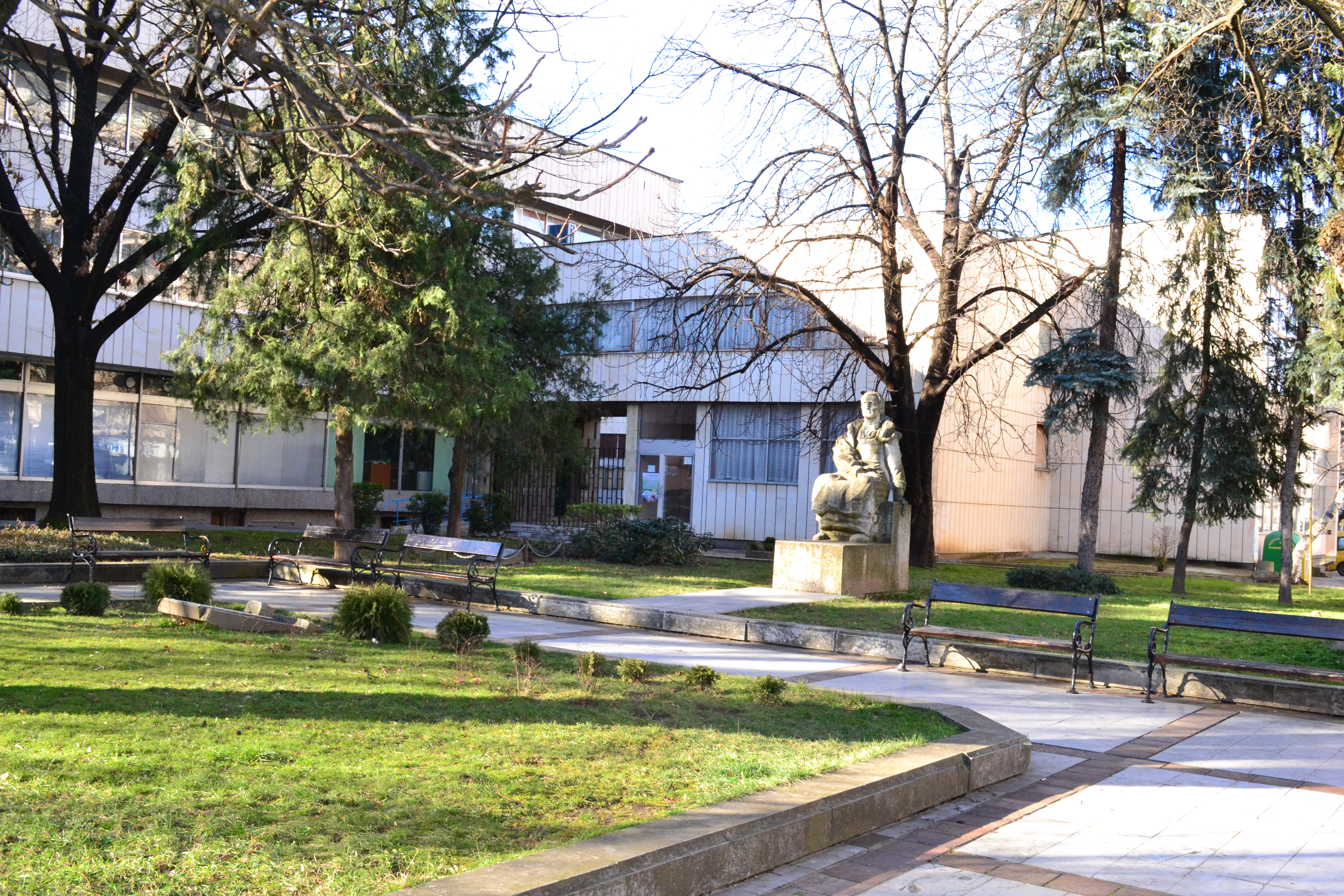
Library Ivan Vazov
