= Pravets Municipality =

Coordinates: 42°53′N 23°55′E

Pravets Municipality Община Правец
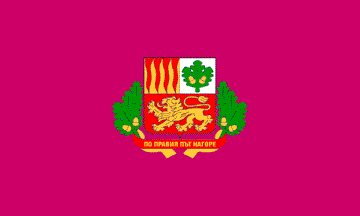
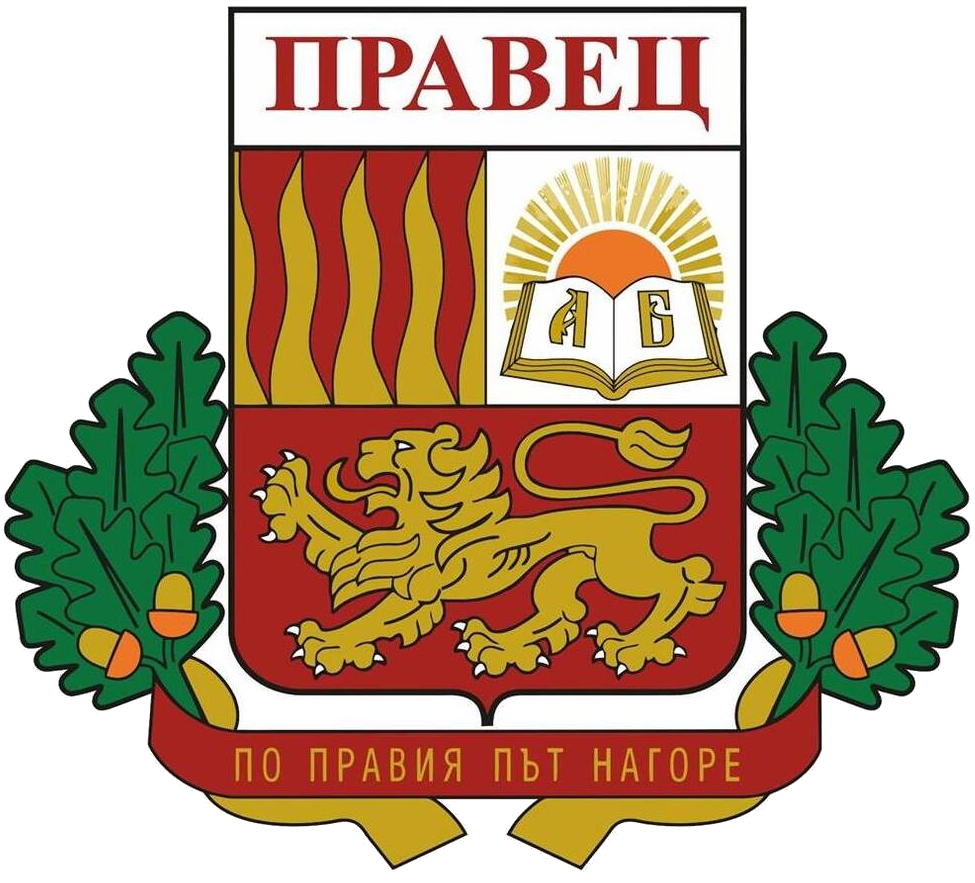
- Flag Seal

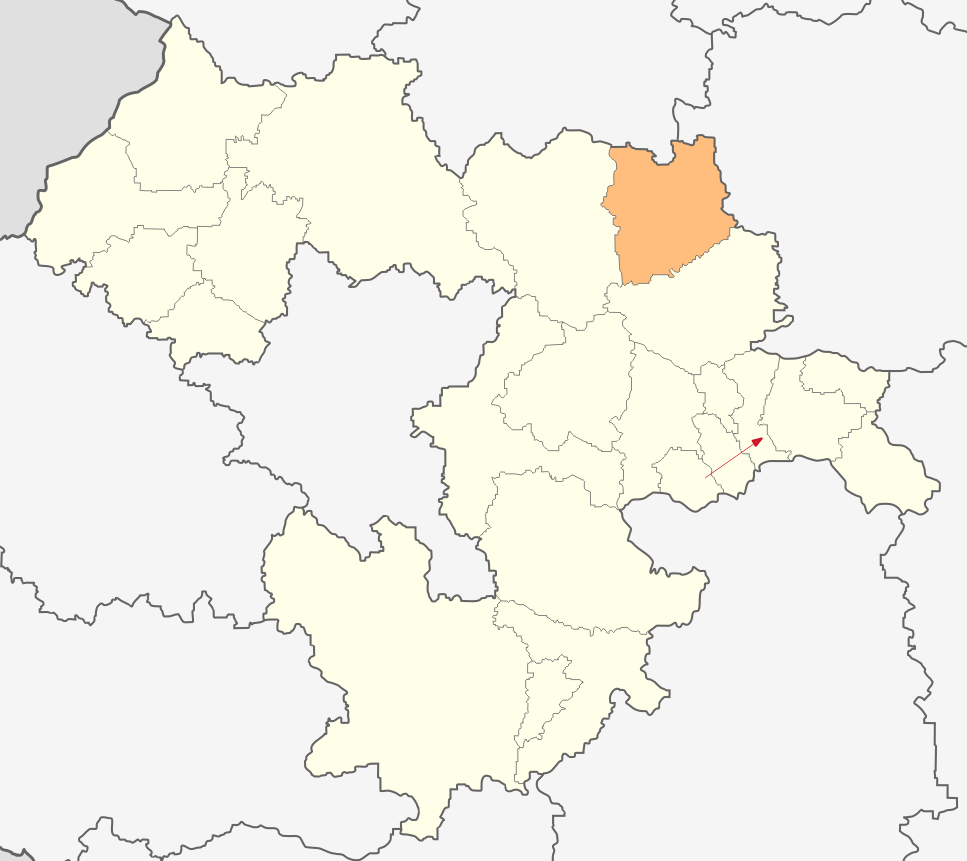
- Country: Bulgaria
- Province: Sofia Province
- Seat: Pravets

Area
  - Total: 316.7 km^{2} (122.3 sq mi)

Population (2024)
  - Total: 7,014
  - Density: 22.15/km^{2} (57.36/sq mi)
- Website: www.pravets.bg

Pravets Municipality (Bulgarian: Община Правец) is a municipality in Sofia Province, western Bulgaria. Covering a territory of 316.7 km^{2}, it is the ninth largest of the 22 municipalities in the province, encompassing 4.47% of its total area. It borders the municipalities of Etropole to the south, Botevgrad to the west, Roman to the north, Yablanitsa to the northeast, and Teteven to the east.

== Geography ==
The relieve is varied. About half of the total area lies within the low lying ridge Lakavitsa, which is part of the fore-Balkan hilly range. Further north are two other ridges of the fore-Balkan, Dragoitsa and Gola Glava. To the south Lakavitsa connects with the main ridge of the Balkan Mountain via a 657 m saddle. The highest point of the municipality is the summit of Manyakov Kamak (1,439 m). Between Lakavitsa and the Balkan Mountains lie the easternmost reaches of the Botevgrad Valley.

Pravets Municipality falls within the temperate continental climatic zone. Most of its territory is drained by the river Malki Iskar, a right tributary of the Iskar of the Danube drainage, as well as some of its tributaries, such as the Bebresh.

== Transport ==
Pravets Municipality is traversed by five roads of the national network with a total length of 74.8 km, including a 20.8 km section of the Hemus motorway (A2) that connects the capital Sofia with the Black Sea port of Varna, a 19.6 km stretch of the first class I-3 road Byala–Pleven–Botevgrad, the first 3.2 km of second class II-37 road Dzhurovo–Panagyurishte–Dospat, the first 16.1 km of the third class III-308 road, and the first 9 km of the third class III-3009 road.

== Demography ==
The population is 7,014 as of 2024.

There are 10 villages and one town in Pravets Municipality:

- Dzhurovo
- Kalugerovo
- Manaselska Reka
- Osikovitsa
- Osikovska Lakavitsa
- Pravets
- Praveshka Lakavitsa
- Ravnishte
- Razliv
- Svode
- Vidrare

== Gallery ==
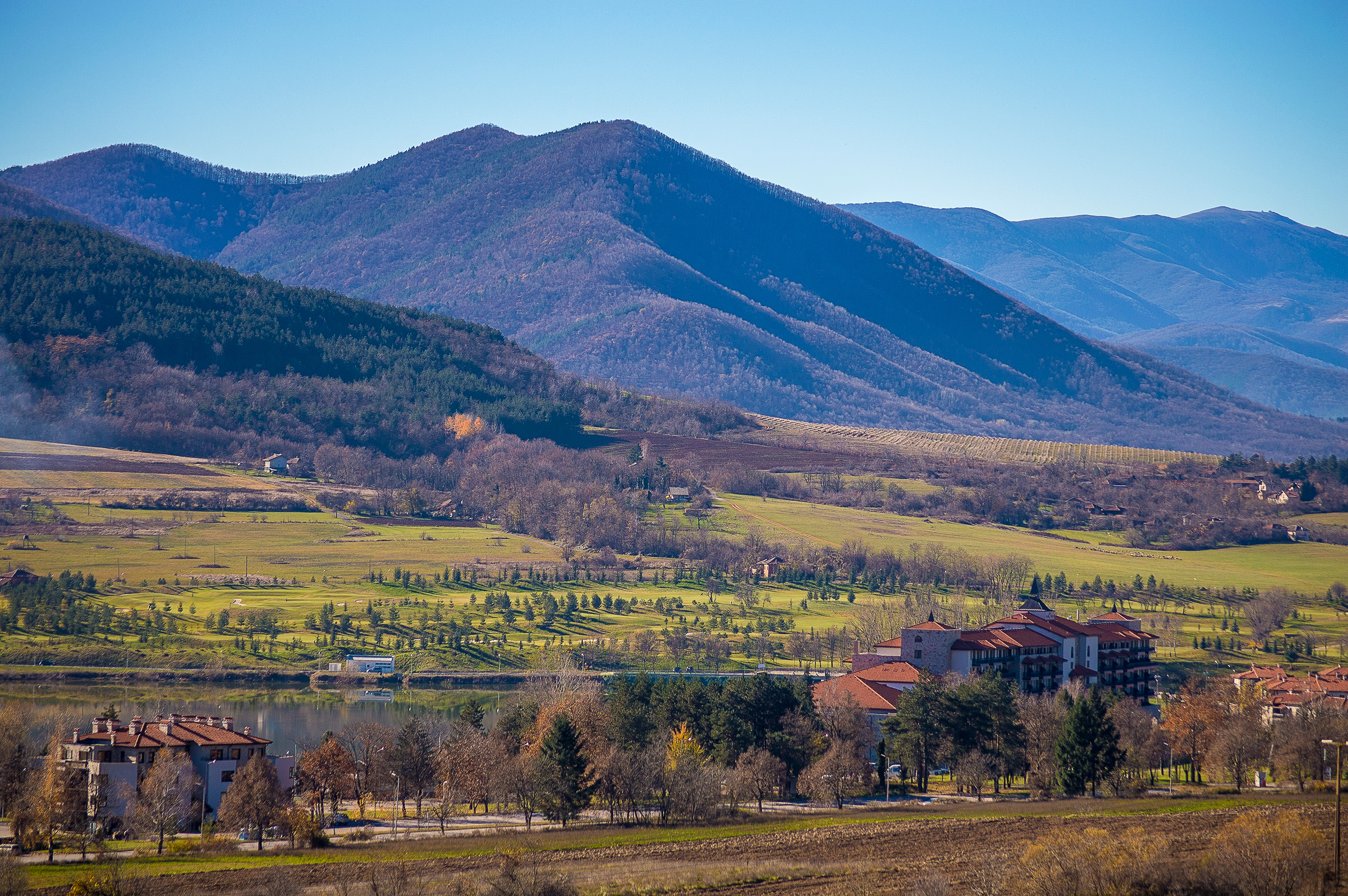
A view near Pravets

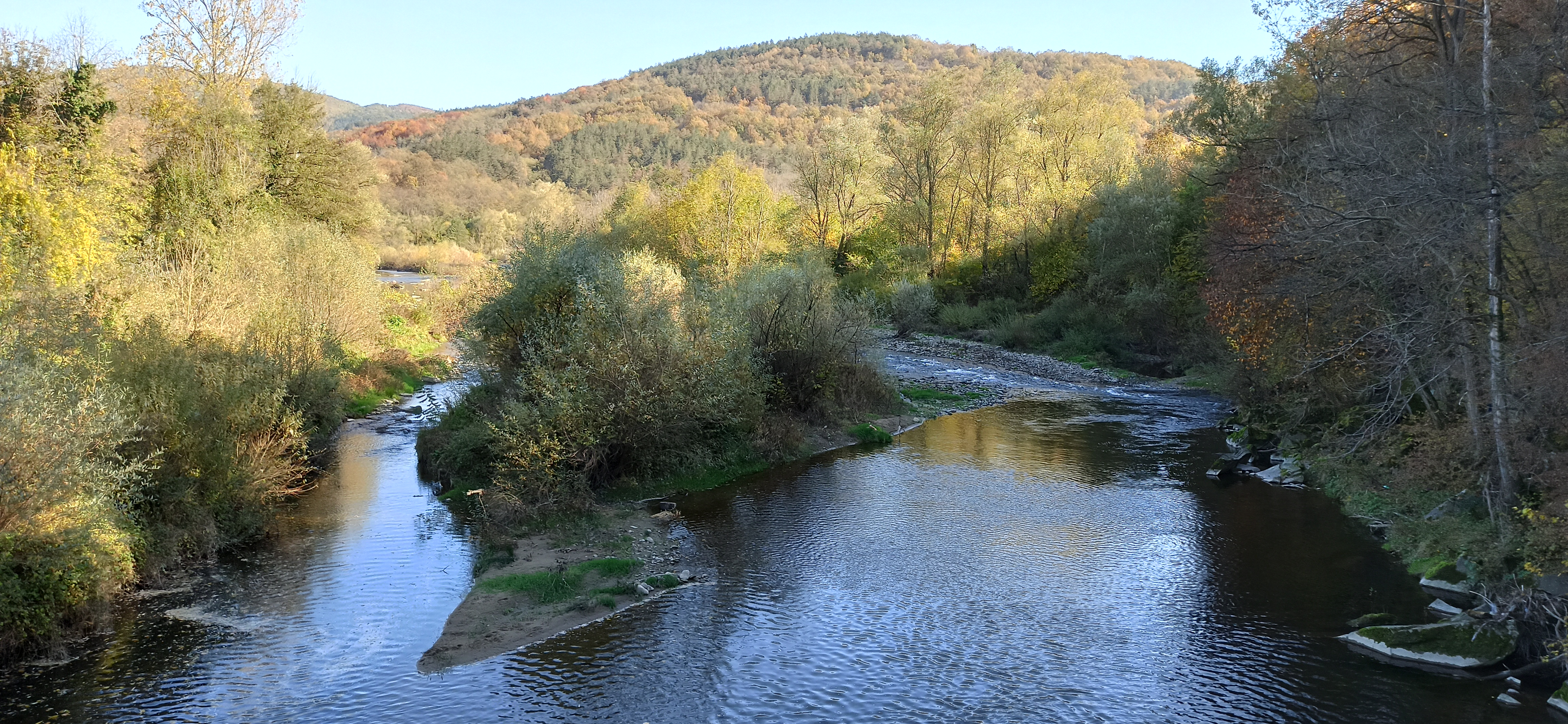
Malki Iskar near Svode

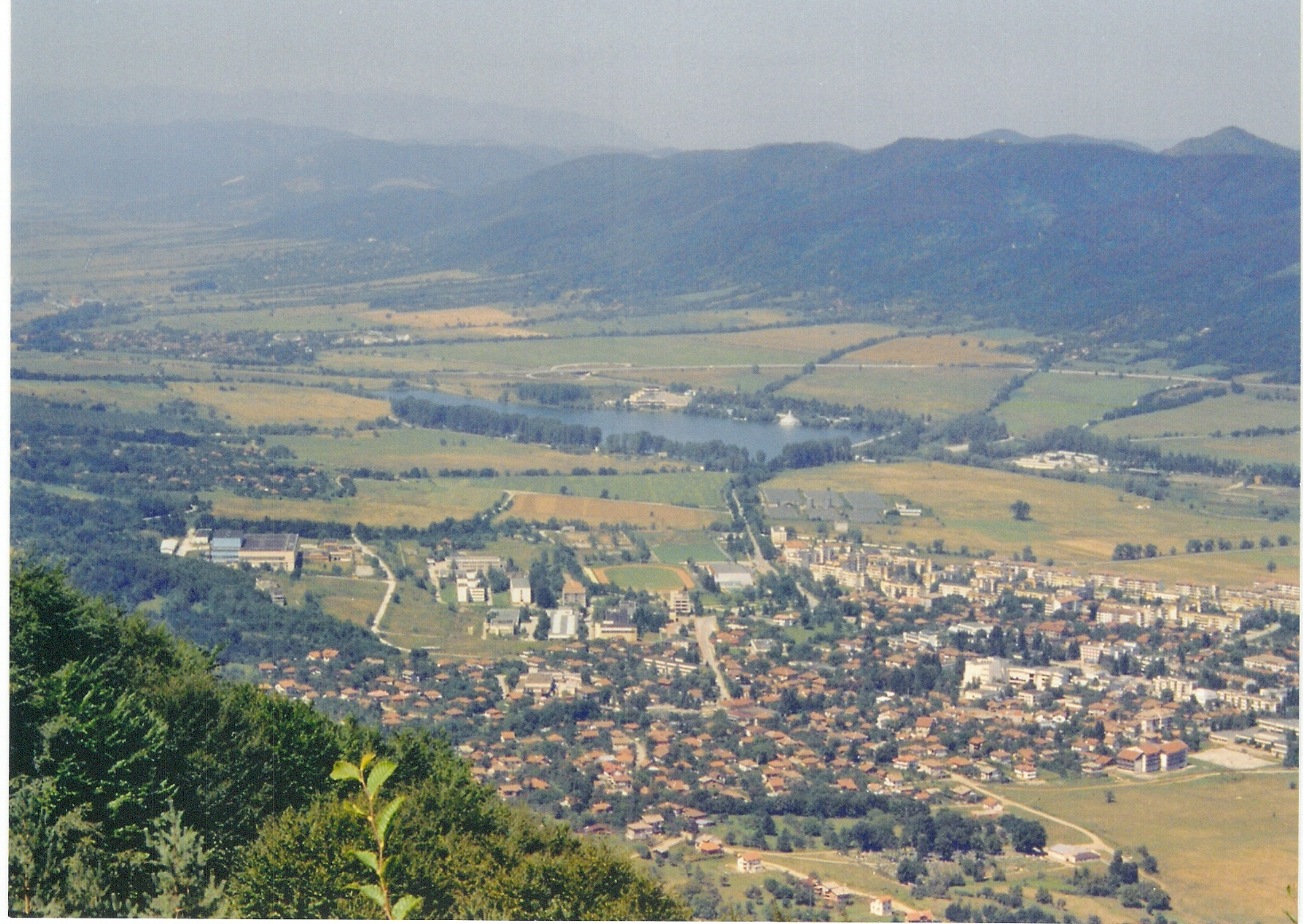
A view of Pravets

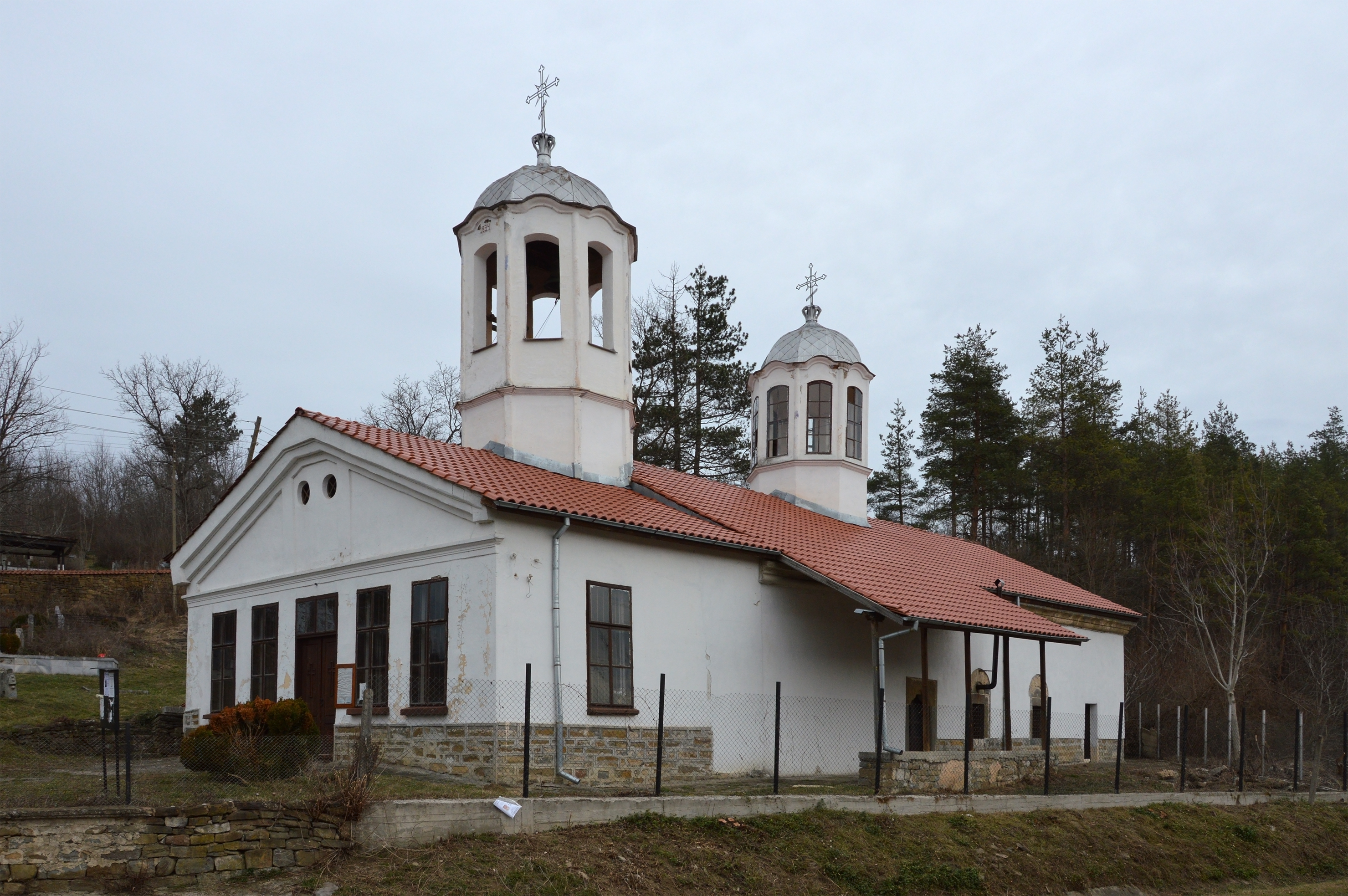
Church of Saint Michael the Archangel in Osikovitsa
