= Rudinata =

Natural monument in Bulgaria

Protected area "Rudinata"
- Location within Bulgaria
- Location: Sofia Province, Bulgaria
- Coordinates: 42.85°N 23.851°E
- Area: 37 ha (91 acres)
- Established: 25 April 1984

Rudinata (Bulgarian: Рудината) is a natural monument in Western Bulgaria.

It is located in the Bilo mountain, part of the Balkan Mountains, within the territory of Botevgrad Municipality and Etropole Municipality in Sofia Province. The nearest settlements are Botevgrad and Boykovets village. Its total area is 37 ha.

It was declared a protected area on 25 April 1984 in order to conserve a century-old European beech (Fagus sylvatica) forest.

The protection regime within Rudinata includes: prohibition of logging, except sanitary, prohibition of livestock grazing, ban of mining and other activities that violate the environment of the area, ban of picking up herbs and flowers, and prohibition of hunting.

Other protected areas nearby include the natural sites Elaka, Belikata and Grohotka.
