= Urvich protected area =

Protected area in Bulgaria

Protected area "Urvich"
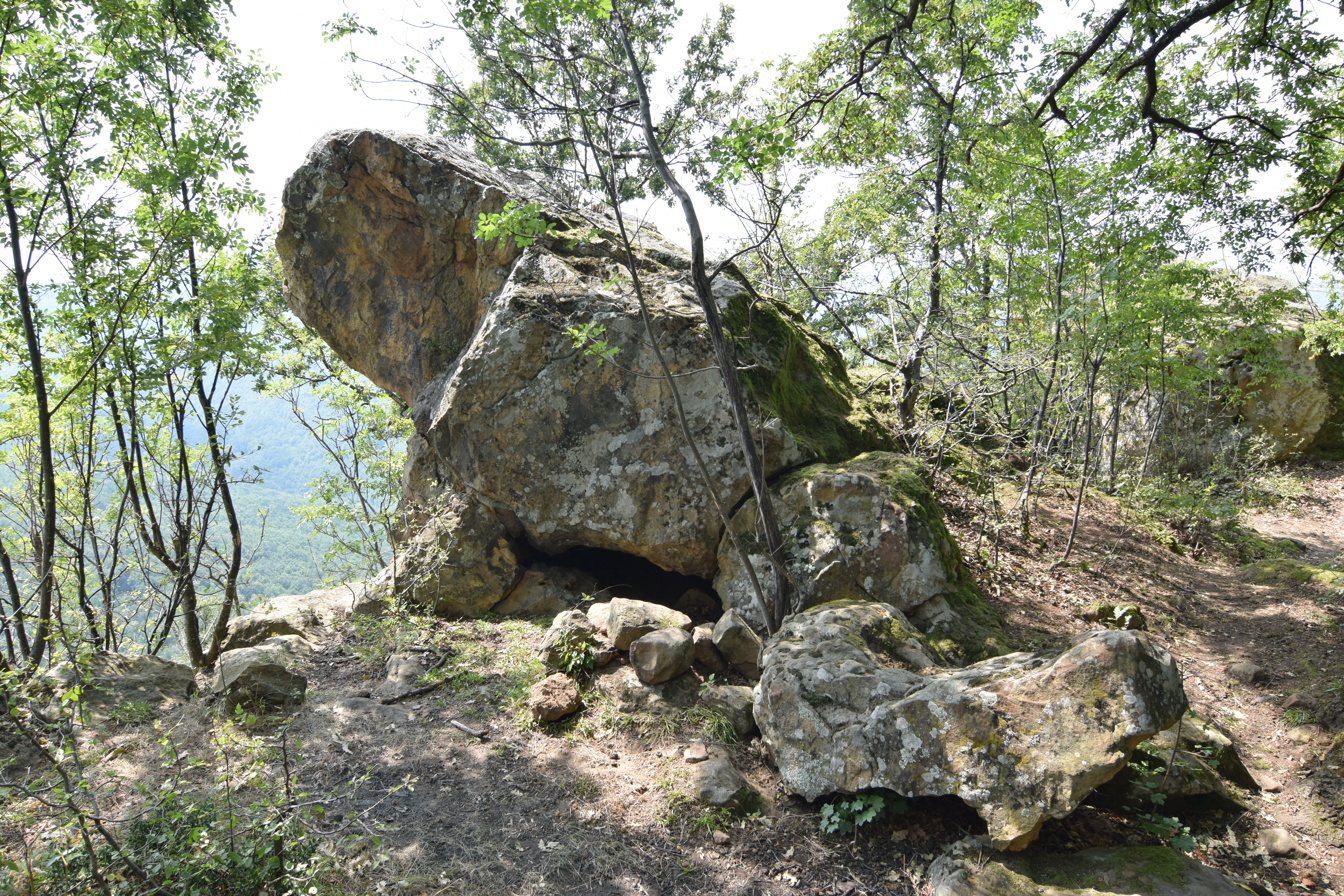

- Location within Bulgaria
- Location: Botevgrad, Bulgaria
- Coordinates: 42.991°N 23.819°E
- Area: 933 ha (2,310 acres)
- Established: 24 July 1962

Urvich (Bulgarian: Урвич) is a protected area in the western Balkan Mountains of Bulgaria, encompassing an area of 93.3 hectares. It is located near the fortress of Bozhenishki Urvich within the lands of the village of Bozhenitsa, Botevgrad Municipality. It was initially declared a historic site on 24 July 1962 for the conservation of mixed oak forests. It has been re-categorised as a protected area on 18 August 2003.

Within the protected area it is prohibited:

- to build quarries and dig up stones;
- to make excavations and destroy the fortress wall;
- to graze livestock, to hunt, as well as any other activities which destroy or erase the remains of the fortress.
