= Glavinitsa, Pazardzhik Province =

Glavinitsa Главиница
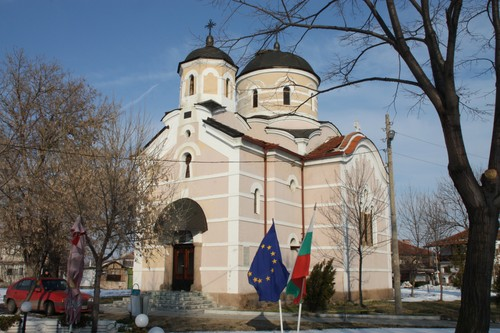
- The Church of St Archangel Michael in Glavinitsa

- Location of Glavinitsa, Bulgaria
- Coordinates: 42°9′26.6″N 24°18′31.53″E
- Country: Bulgaria
- Provinces (Oblast): Pazardzhik Province

Government
  - Mayor: Svetozar Genov
- Elevation: 210 m (690 ft)

Population (15.03.2024)
  - Total: 2,199
- Time zone: UTC+2 (EET)
  - Summer (DST): UTC+3 (EEST)
- Postal Code: 4409
- Area codes: 034 from Bulgaria, 0035934 from outside

Glavinitsa (Bulgarian: Главиница) is a village in southern Bulgaria. It has a population of 2,199 as of 2024.

== Geography ==
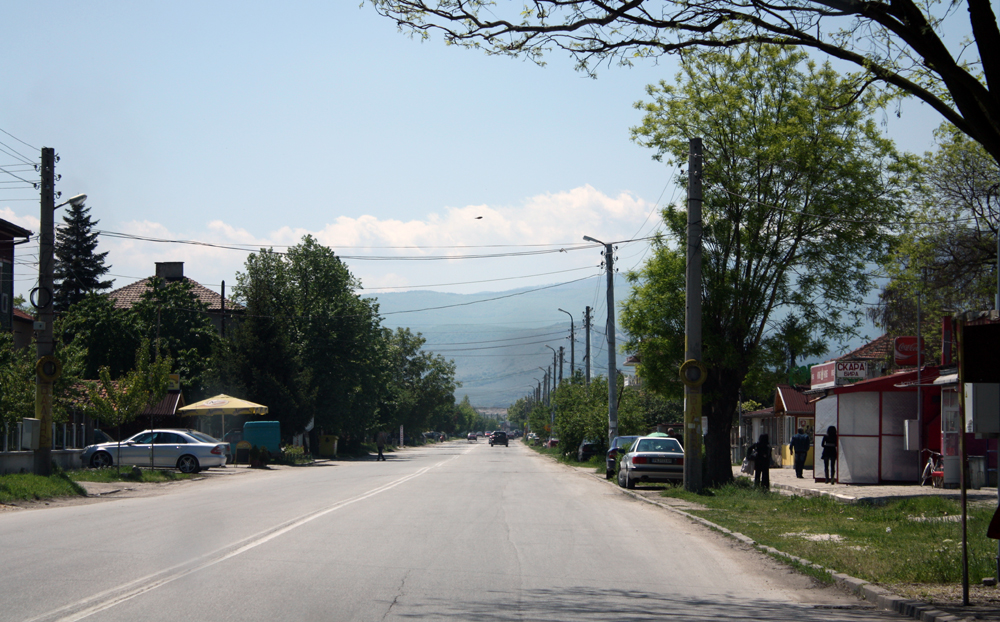
The II-37 road through Glavinitsa

Glavinitsa is situated at an altitude of 205 m in the western part of the Upper Thracian Plain, about 2 m south of the river Maritsa and just north of the northern foothills of the Rhodope Mountains. The village falls within the transitional continental climatic zone.

Administratively, Glavinitsa is located in Pazardzhik Municipality in the central part Pazardzhik Province and has a territory of 10.202 km^{2}. It lies just south of the municipal center Pazardzhik at a distance of 4 km. Less than a kilometer to the southwest is the village of Aleko Konstantinovo; other nearby settlements include Mokrishte to the northwest and Miryantsi to the northeast, across the Maritsa. The village is served by the second class II-37 road, which runs directly through the settlement, as well as the first class I-8 road and the Trakiya motorway a few kilometers to the north. Almost adjacent to Glavinitsa is the Pazardzhik Railway Station.

== Culture ==
The local school was established in 1880 and was later name after the poet and revolutionary Hristo Botev. The church of Glavinitsa is dedicated to the Archangel Michael. The village cultural center, known in Bulgarian as a chitalishte, was established in 1930 and was named "Probuda", meaning Awakening. It maintains a library and two folklore group for music and dances.

== Economy ==
The village lies in a fertile agricultural area. Crops include grain, grapes, fruits and vegetables. Livestock breeding is also developed.
