= Vrachesh Monastery =

Orthodox monastery in Vrachesh, Sofia Province, Bulgaria

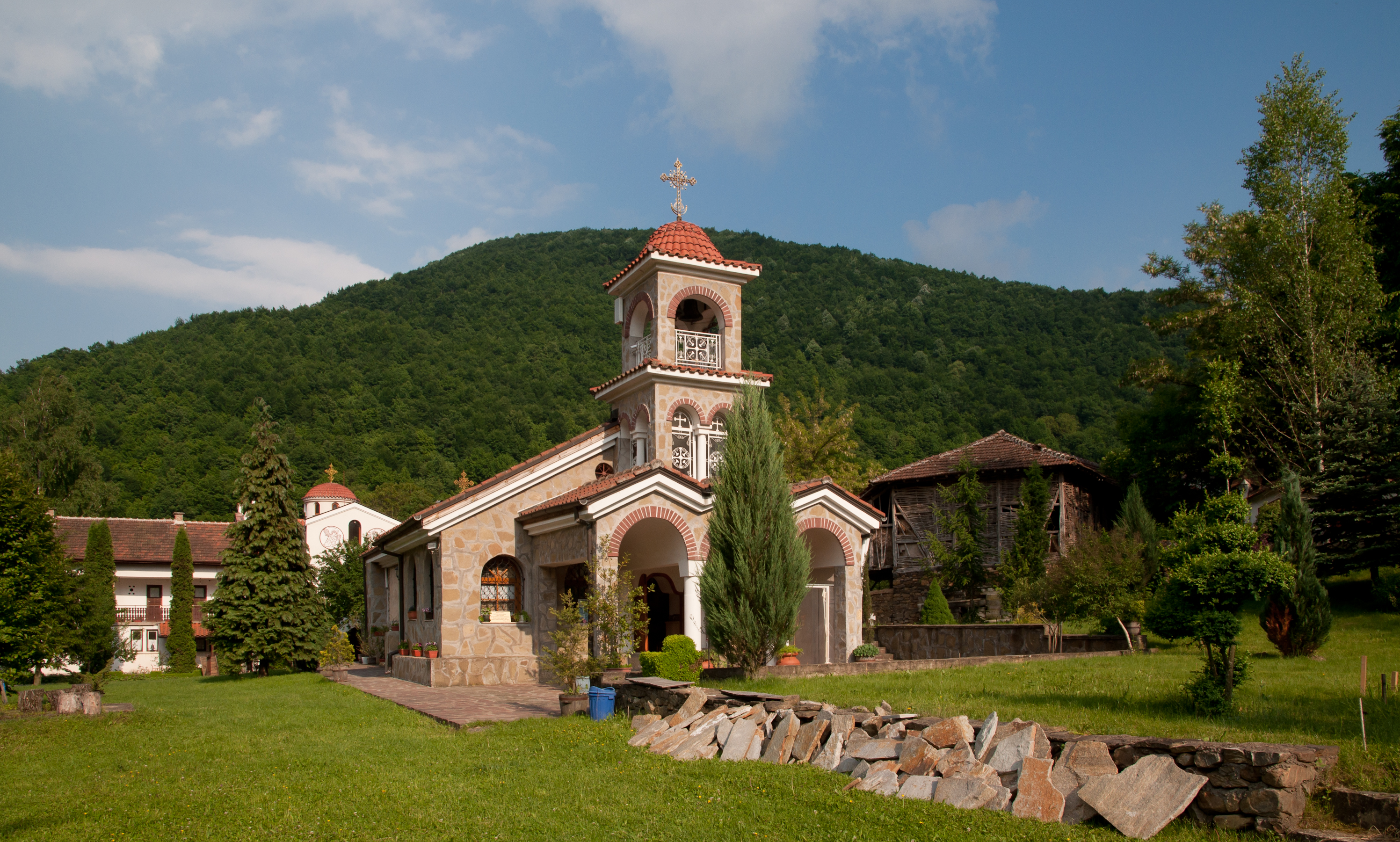
- Vrachesh Monastery

- Location within Bulgaria
- Interactive map of Vrachesh Monastery

Monastery information
- Other name: "Holy Forty Martyrs" Vrachesh Monastery
- Established: 13th century

Site
- Location: Vrachesh, Botevgrad Municipality, Sofia Province
- Coordinates: 42°53′13.55″N 23°41′56.32″E
- Public access: yes

The "Holy Forty Martyrs" Vrachesh Monastery (Bulgarian: Врачешки манастир „Свети Четиридесет мъченици“) is an active monastery in the Lovech Diocese of the Bulgarian Orthodox Church.

It is located in the western Balkan Mountains of Bulgaria, 5 km west of the village of Vrachesh and 10 km from the town of Botevgrad.

== History ==
The monastery was founded in the 13th century during the Second Bulgarian Empire after the important Bulgarian victory in the battle of Klokotnitsa in 1230, when emperor Ivan Asen II (r. 1218–1241) defeated the Epirote despot Theodore Komnenos Doukas. The battle took place on the day of the Holy Forty Martyrs, and the emperor ordered the construction of many churches and monasteries bearing their name.

The monastery was initially a friary, with the monks transcribing and distributing liturgical books. In the 17th century, there was a functioning cellar school in the monastery. The monastery was burned twice by the Ottoman Turks in the 15th and 18th centuries, then sank into oblivion until 1890. In 1891 on the old foundations Vuno Markov, considered to be the most famous master in the Botevgrad region, built a modest church, thus restoring the monastic life in the area. The monastery started off again as a friary, but since 1937 it accepted nuns as well, the first one being Cassiana. The monastery is currently active.

== Architecture ==
It is a complex of churches, residential and commercial buildings. The monastery church is one-nave, one-apse, with an inner and open narthex over which a bell tower rises. In one of the residential buildings a chapel was later built, dedicated to the Bulgarian Saint Clement of Ohrid. The monastic holy spring is situated nearby, on the right bank of the river. Above the monastery rises a steep hill, which hosts the remains of the Gradiste Fortress (Cheskovgrad).

The monastery is declared a monument of culture.

== Gallery ==
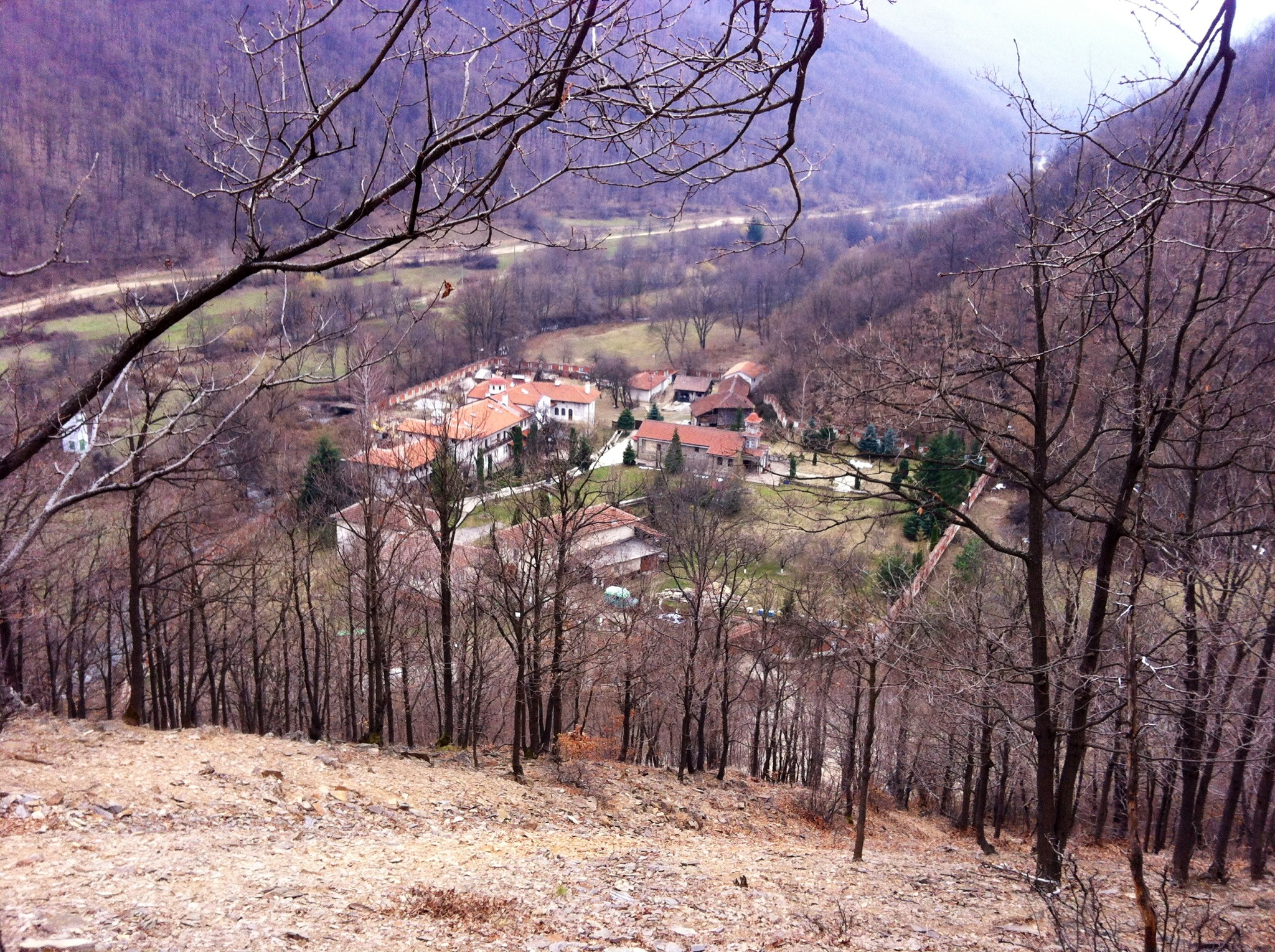

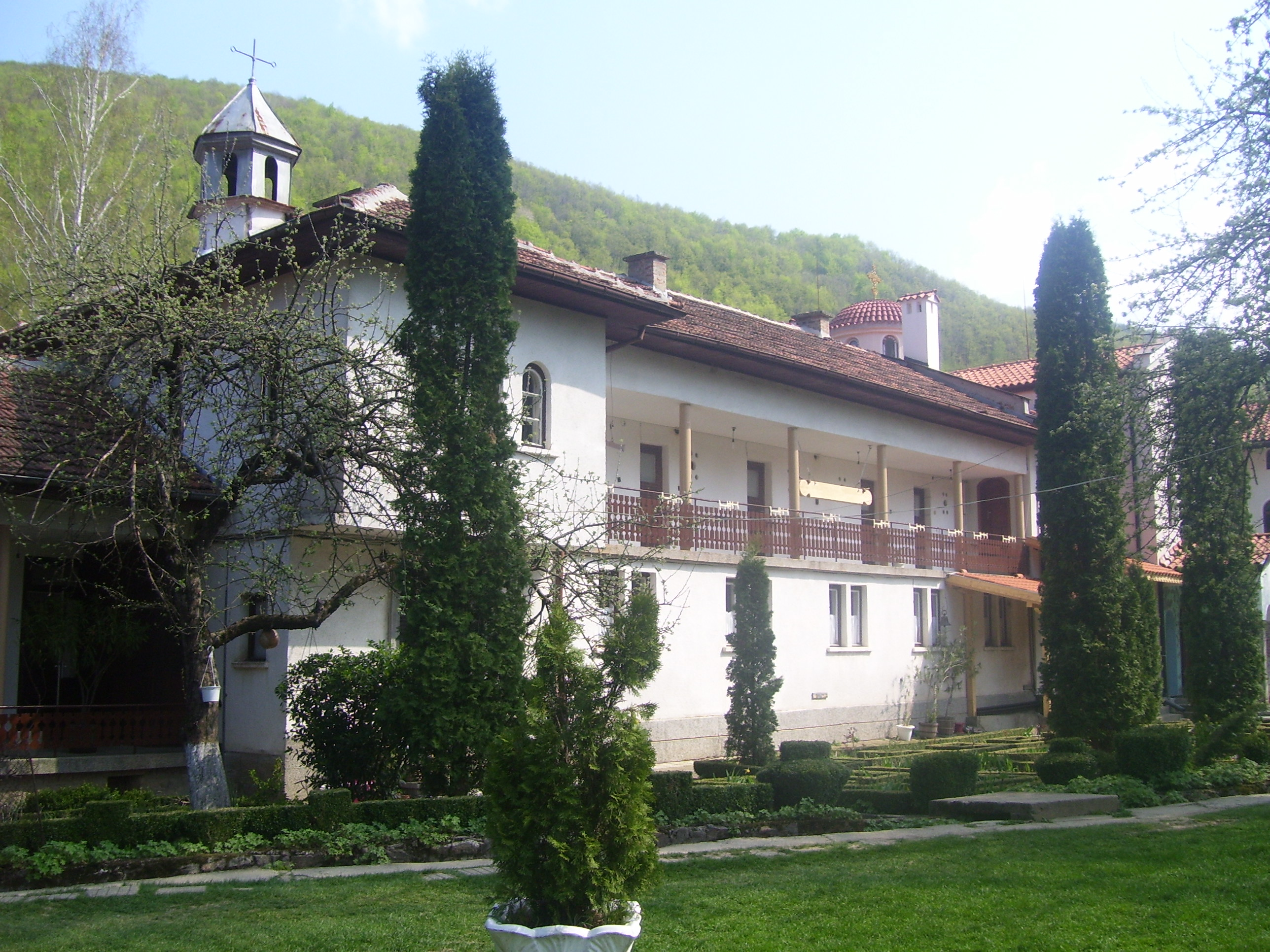

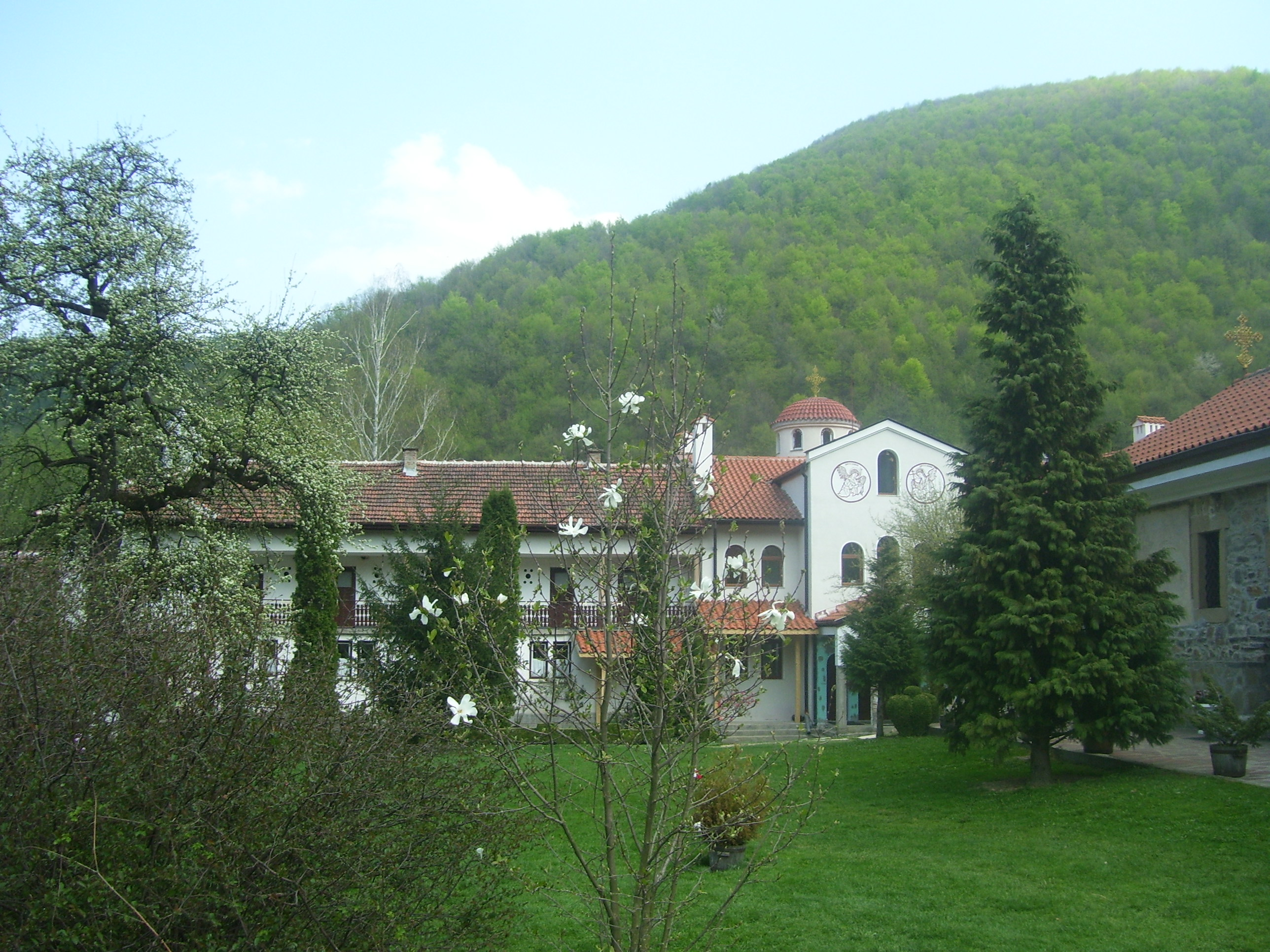
