= Botevgrad Municipality =

Coordinates: 42°54′N 23°47′E

Botevgrad Municipality Община Ботевград
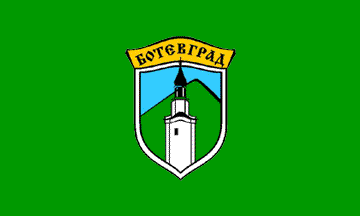
- Flag Seal

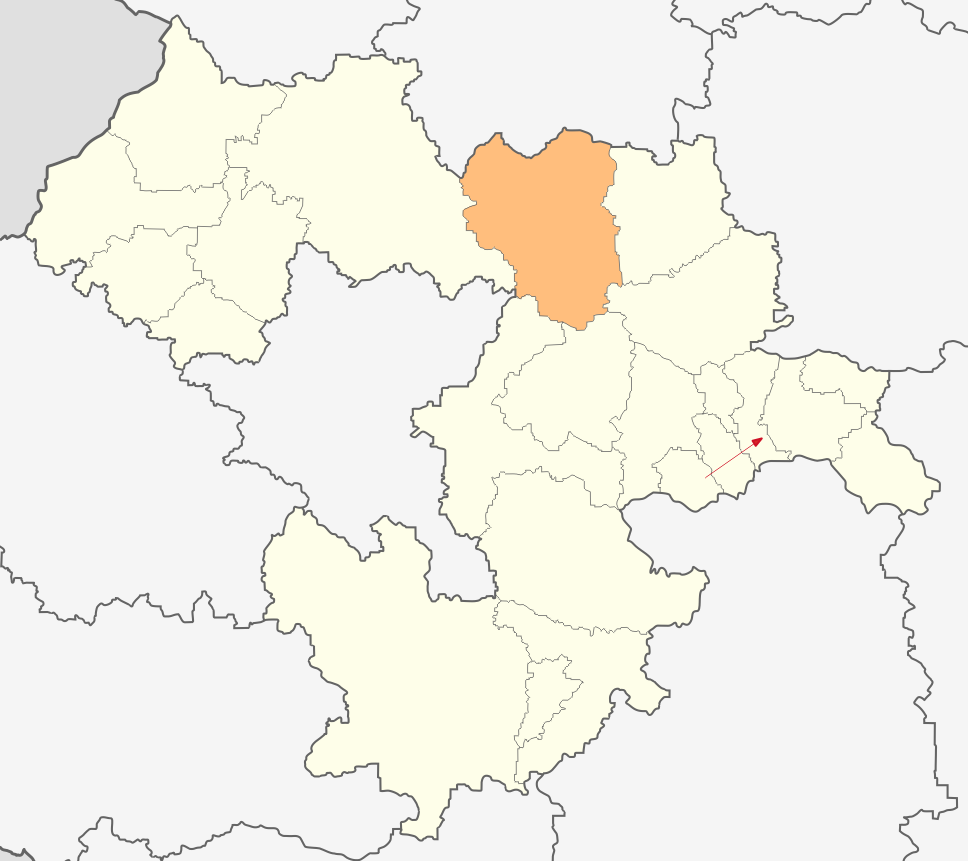
- Country: Bulgaria
- Province: Sofia Province
- Seat: Botevgrad

Area
  - Total: 518.9 km^{2} (200.3 sq mi)

Population (2024)
  - Total: 30,225
  - Density: 58.25/km^{2} (150.9/sq mi)
- Website: botevgrad.bg

Botevgrad Municipality (Bulgarian: Община Ботевград) is a municipality in Sofia Province, western Bulgaria. Covering a territory of 518.9 km^{2}, it is the fourth largest of the 22 municipalities in the province, encompassing 7.33% of its total area. It borders the municipalities of Pravets to the east, Etropole to the southeast, Gorna Malina to the south, Elin Pelin to the southwest, Svoge to the west, and Mezdra and Roman to the north, the latter two in Vratsa Province.

== Geography ==
The relieve is varied. In its central part lies the Botevgrad Valley with a length of 28–30 km and a maximum width of 12 km, spanning some 150 km^{2} with an elevation of 320–420 m. North and northeast of the valley are two ridges of the fore-Balkan, Gola Glava and Lakavitsa. To the west and south of the valley rise four ridges of the main range of the Balkan Mountains — Rzhana, Golema Planina, Murgash and Bilo. The highest point of the municipality is the summit of Murgash (1,687 m) at the boundary with Sofia City Province. The lowest elevation is 242 m in the east part of the Botevgrad Valley at the border with Pravets Municipality.

Botevgrad Municipality falls within the temperate continental climatic zone. Over 90% of its territory is drained by the river Bebresh, a left tributary of the Malki Iskar, itself a right tributary of the Iskar of the Danube drainage. The Muhalnitsa protected area is situated in the Botevgrad Valley and is known for a unique breeding migration of the common frog (Rana temporaria).

== Transport ==
Botevgrad Municipality is traversed by four roads of the national network with a total length of 89.8 km, including a 17.5 km section of the Hemus motorway (A2) that connects the capital Sofia with the Black Sea port of Varna, a 38 km stretch of the first class I-1 road Vidin–Sofia–Blagoevgrad–Kulata, a 6.2 km stretch of the first class I-3 road Byala–Pleven–Botevgrad, and the last 28.1 km of the third class III-161 road.

== Demography ==
The population is 30,225 as of 2024.

There are 12 villages and one town in Botevgrad Municipality:

- Bozhenitsa
- Botevgrad
- Vrachesh
- Gurkovo
- Elov Dol
- Kraevo
- Lipnitsa
- Litakovo
- Novachene
- Radotina
- Rashkovo
- Skravena
- Trudovets

== Gallery ==
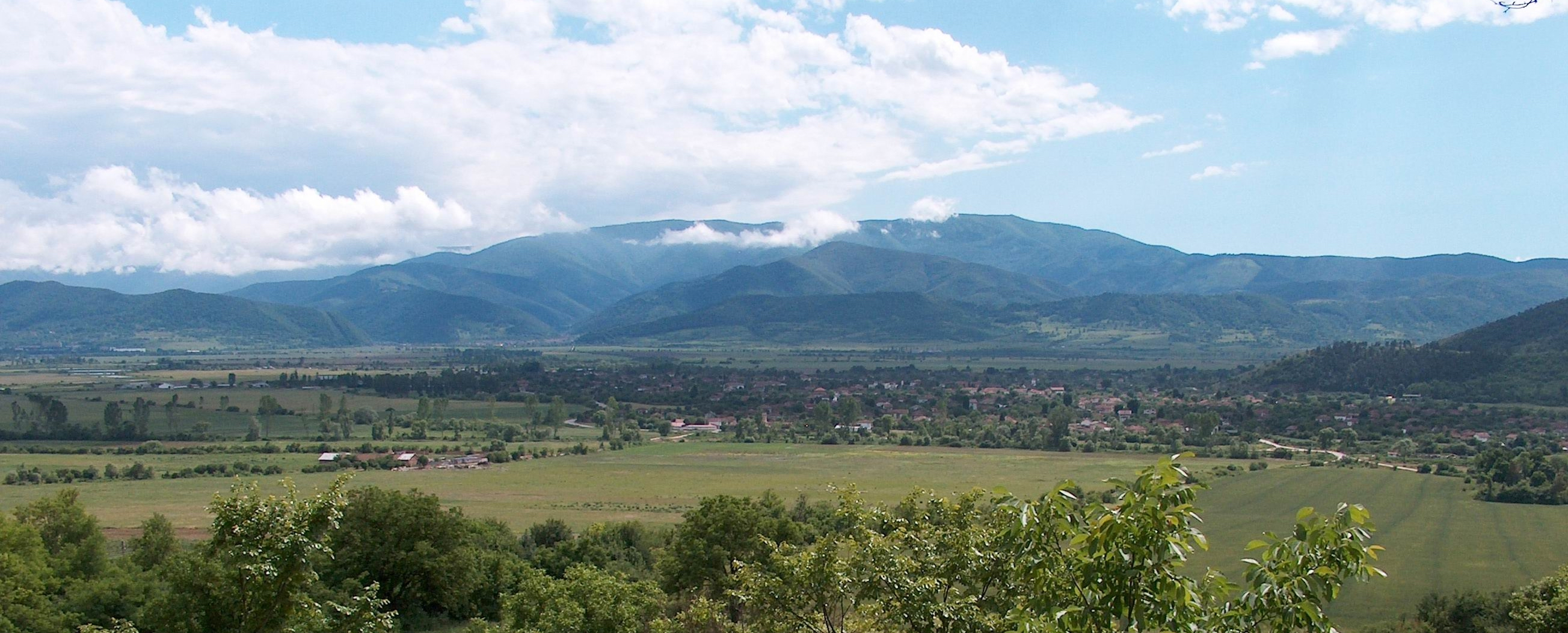
Botevgrad Valley at Skravena

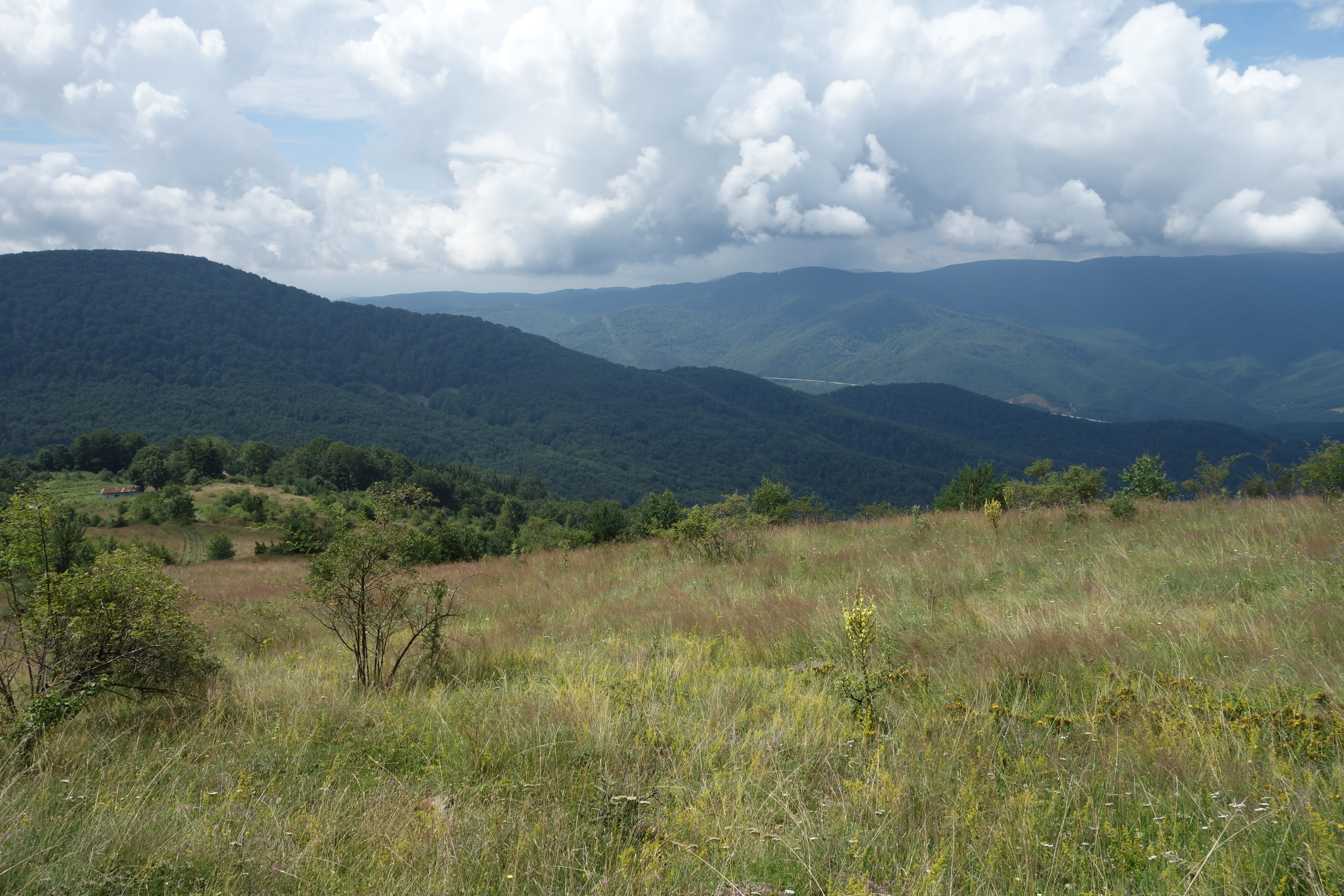
Rudinata protected area

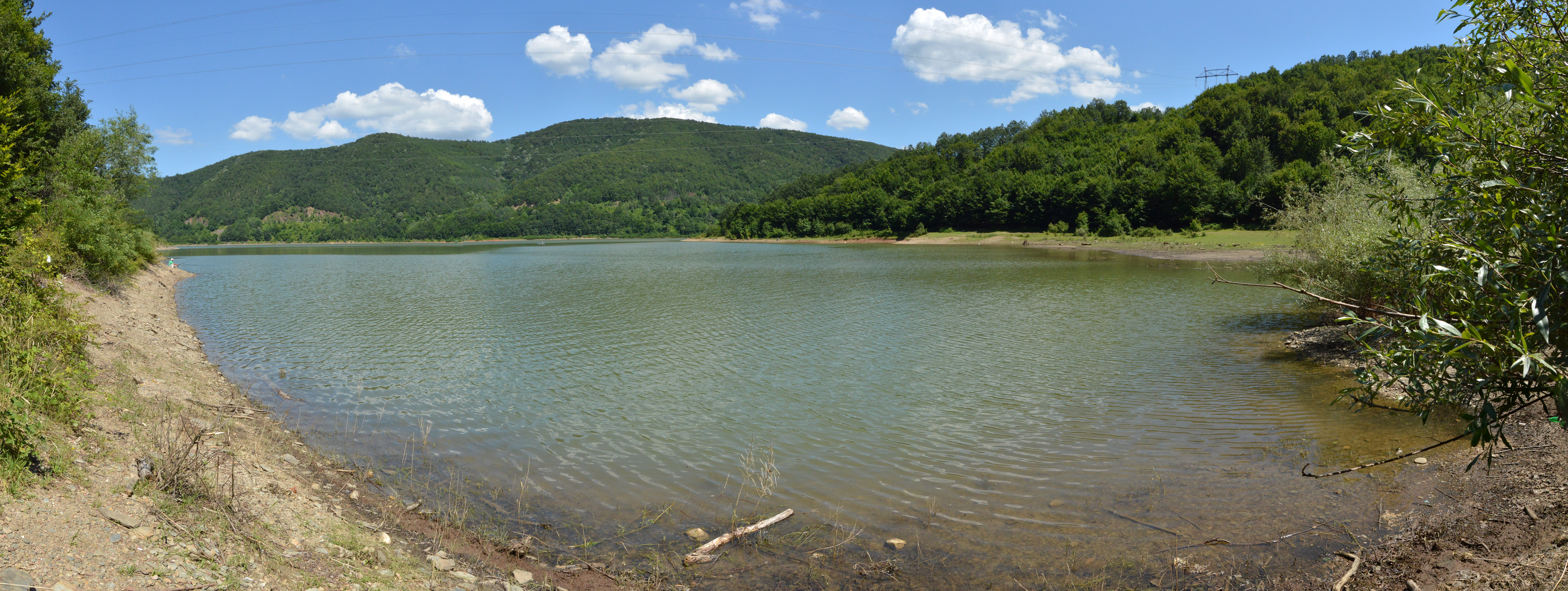
Bebresh Reservoir

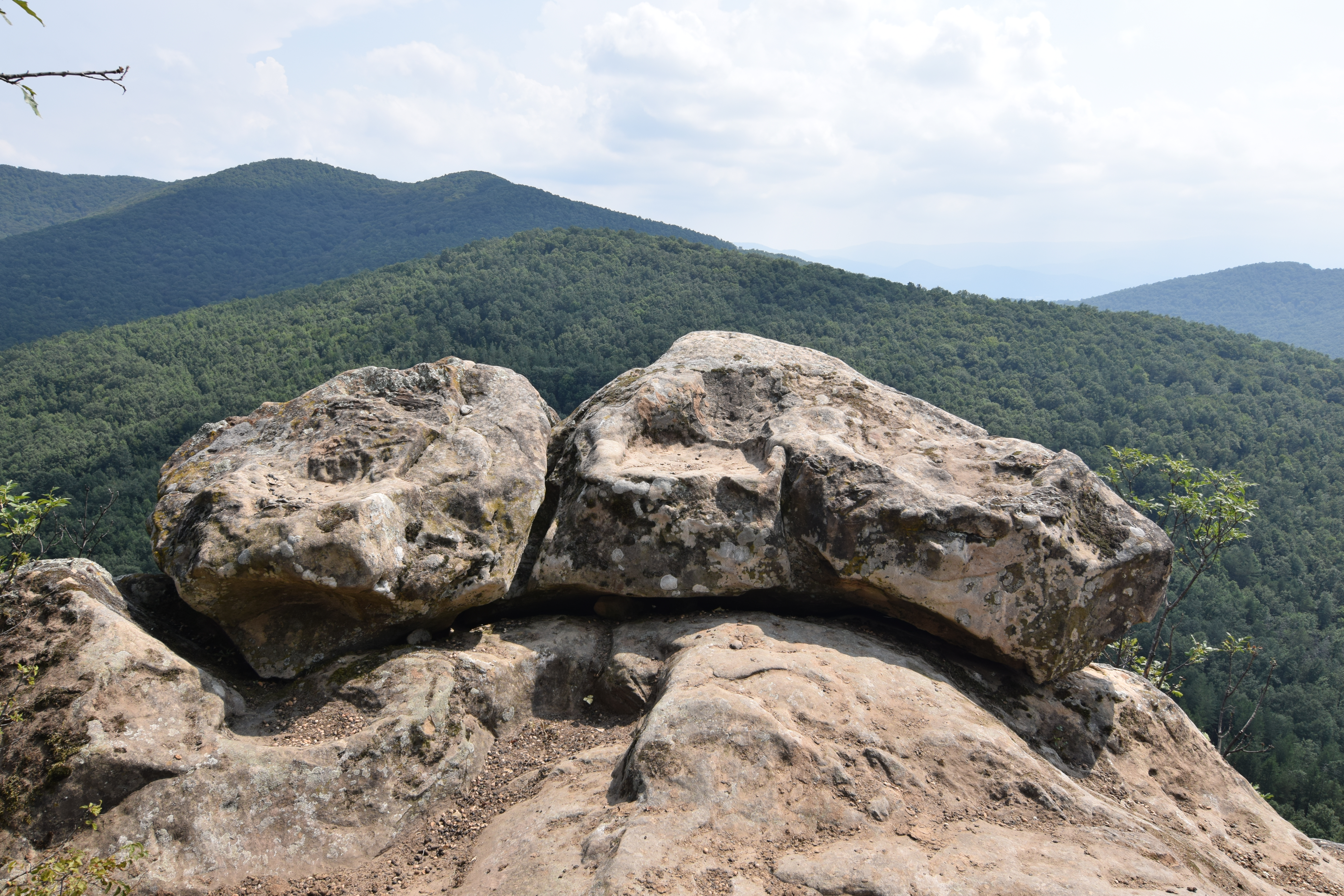
Landscape near the fortress of Bozhenishki Urvich

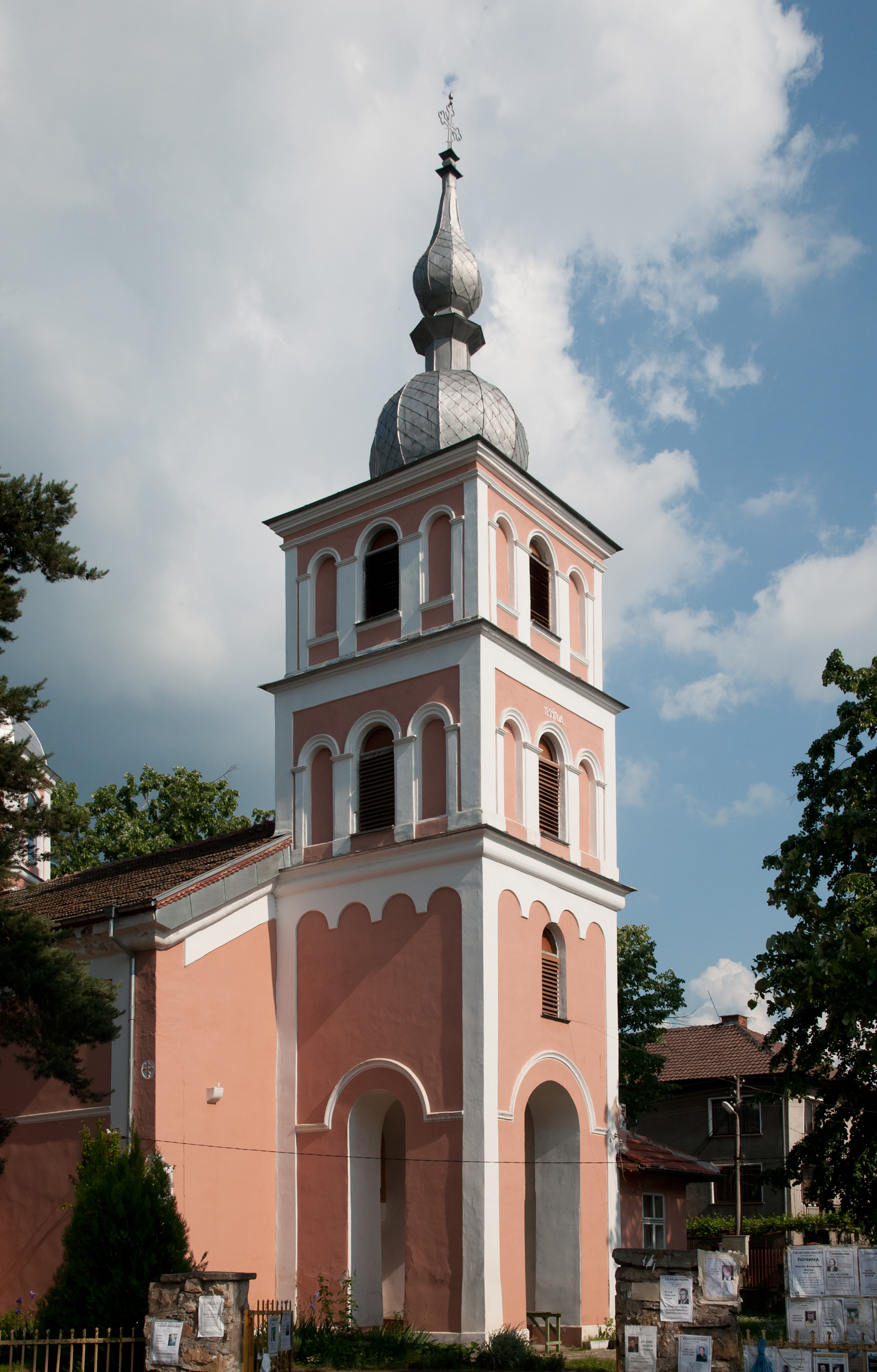
Church of the Ascension of Christ, Botevgrad
