= Aleko Konstantinovo =

Aleko Konstantinovo Алеко Константиново
- Location of Aleko Konstantinovo, Bulgaria
- Coordinates: 42°8′42.57″N 24°17′20.52″E
- Country: Bulgaria
- Provinces (Oblast): Pazardzhik Province

Government
  - Mayor: Vasil Metodiev
- Elevation: 220 m (720 ft)

Population (15.09.2022)
  - Total: 3,265
- Time zone: UTC+2 (EET)
  - Summer (DST): UTC+3 (EEST)
- Postal Code: 4495
- Area codes: 03527 from Bulgaria, 003593527 from outside

Aleko Konstantinovo (Bulgarian: Алеко Константиново) is a village in southern Bulgaria. It has a population of 3,265 as of 2022. The village is named after the renown Bulgarian writer Aleko Konstantinov, who was assassinated nearby en route to Peshtera in 1897.

== Geography ==
Aleko Konstantinovo is situated at an altitude of 210 m in the western part of the Upper Thracian Plain, at the northern foothills of the Rhodope Mountains and the Besaparski Hills. A small river runs through the village and flows into the Maritsa several kilometers to the northeast. The village falls within the transitional continental climatic zone. The soils are chernozem and alluvial.

Administratively, the village is located in central Pazardzhik Province and has a territory of 15.864 km^{2}. It is part of Pazardzhik Municipality. The distance from the municipal center Pazardzhik is 7 km in northern direction. It is less than 1 km southeast of the neighbouring village of Glavinitsa, situated on the main north–south transport artery of the province, the second class II-37 road. To the southwest along the third class III-3706 road are the villages of Debarshtitsa, Tsrancha and Patalenitsa.

== Culture ==
The local school was established in 1875 and its current edifice was constructed in 1926. The church of Aleko Konstantinovo is dedicated to the Ascension of Jesus. The local cultural center, known in Bulgarian as a chitalishte, was established in 1925 and was initially named Besapara, after the nearby hilly ridge, but was later renamed in honour of Ivan Grozdanov. It maintains a library and a folklore group for music and dances. There is a monument at the place where Aleko Konstantinov was assassinated.

== Economy ==
The village lies in a fertile agricultural area and has well-developed livestock breeding and irrigation system. South of the settlement, along the northernmost slopes of the Rhodope Mountains is located the Aleko Hydro Power Plant (71.7 MW), part of the Batak Hydropower Cascade (254 MW).
