= I-3 road (Bulgaria) =

Road in Bulgaria

Republic Road I-3
- Републикански път I-3
- I-3 road highlighted in orange

Route information
- Length: 203 km (126 mi)

Major junctions
- From: , Byala
- To: , Botevgrad

Location
- Country: Bulgaria
- Major cities: Pleven

Highway system
- Highways in Bulgaria

Republican road I-3 (Bulgarian: Републикански път I-3) is a first class road in northern Bulgaria. It runs between I-5 road near the town of Byala, and I-1 road, at Botevgrad. The total length of the road is 203 km (126 mi) and is part of the European route E83. The road passes through the provinces of Ruse, Veliko Tarnovo, Pleven, Lovech and Sofia.

== Description ==
Road I-3 begins from a junction with the first class I-5 road on the left bank of the river Yantra, west of the town of Byala in Ruse Province. It runs west through the Danubian Plain, passes through the village of Peychinovo and reaches Veliko Tarnovo Province. There, it runs through the villages of Maslarevo, Gorna Studena and Ovcha Mogila, where it crosses the river Barata, and then reaches Pleven Province. The road passes through Kozar Belene, crosses the Osam, and continues west through the villages of Obnova and Totleben, before reaching Pleven, the seventh largest city in Bulgaria. It bypasses Pleven from the north and northwest, crosses the river Vit, and turns southwest.

The road passes through Dolni Dabnik, Gorni Dabnik, Telish and Radomirtsi, and enters Lovech Province. It ascends along the left banks of the river Zlatna Panega, runs through the town of Lukovit and the villages of Petrevene, Rumyantsevo and Zlatna Panega, and reaches its Km 155.8, where a junction forms the beginning of the first class I-4 road.

The I-2 then enters the fore-Balkan, running in parallel to the Hemus motorway for some 28 km. It passes through the town of Yablanitsa and enters Sofia Province at the villages of Dzhurovo, where at its Km 171.7 starts the second class II-37 road. Southwest of Dzhurovo it crosses the river Malki Iskar and then runs through the villages of Osikovitsa, Osikovska Lakavitsa and Praveshka Lakavitsa, reaching the northern outskirts of the town of Pravets. The road turns west, passes through the village of Razliv between the fore-Balkan to the north and the Balkan Mountains to the south, and enters Botevgrad Valley. There, it runs through the villages of Trudovets and the town of Botevgrad, where it reaches its terminus at Km 190.2 of the first class I-1 road.
