= Malki Iskar =

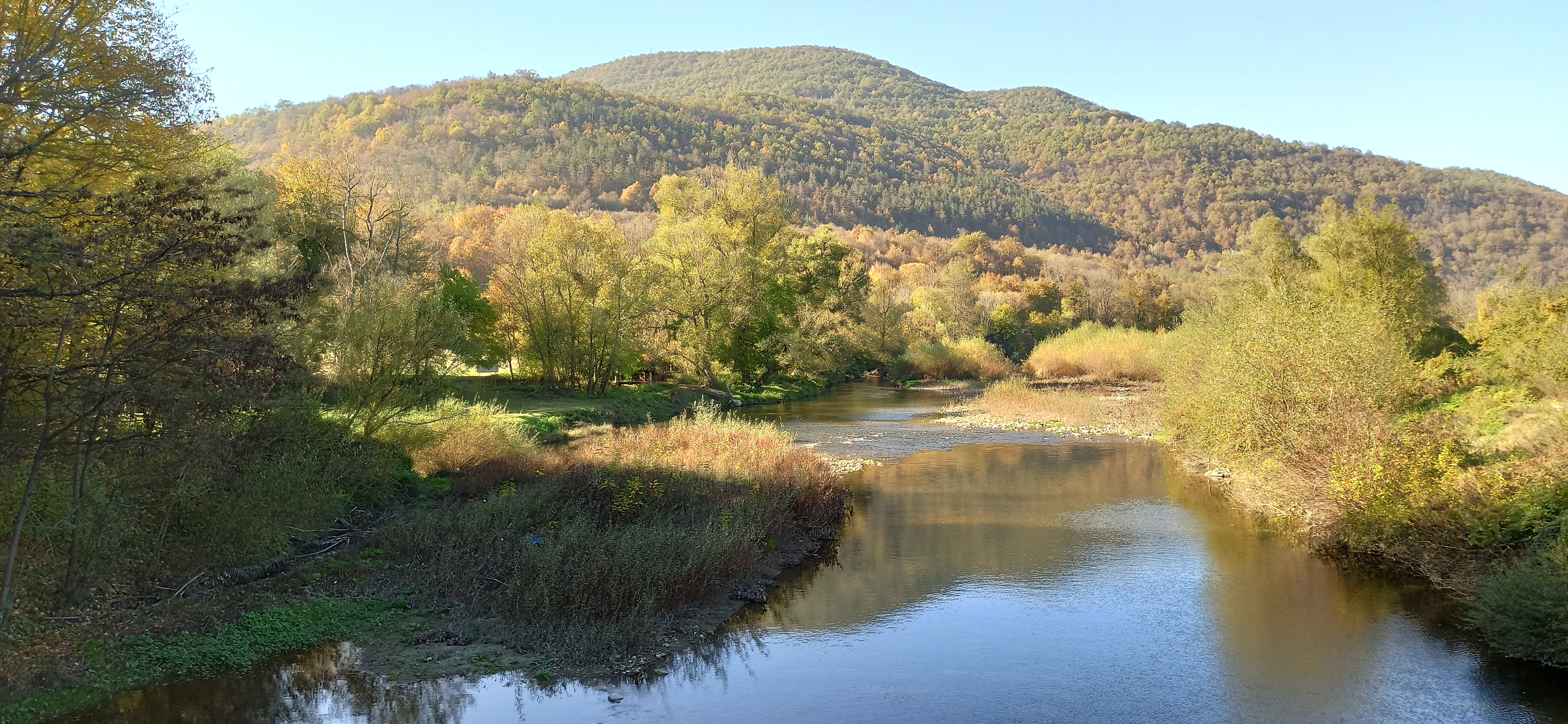

Location
- Country: Bulgaria

Physical characteristics
- Source
  - location: Murgana summit, Balkan Mountains
  - coordinates: 42°44′8.88″N 24°2′38.04″E
  - elevation: 1,573 m (5,161 ft)
- Mouth
  - location: Iskar
  - coordinates: 43°8′53.16″N 23°55′54.12″E
  - elevation: 146 m (479 ft)
- Length: 85 km (53 mi)
- Basin size: 1,284 km^{2} (496 sq mi)

Basin features
- Progression: Iskar→ Danube→ Black Sea

The Malki Iskar (Bulgarian: Малки Искър, meaning Lesser Iskar) is a 85 km-long river in western Bulgaria, a right tributary of the river Iskar. It is the largest tributary of the Iskar.

== Geography ==
The river takes its source under the name Ravna reka at an altitude of 1,573 m, about 300 m northwest of the summit of Murgana (1,639 m) in the Etropole Mountain of the Balkan Mountains. Until the town of Etropole the river flows in northwestern direction in a deep forested valley. In the southern neighbourhoods of the town the Malki Iskar turns to the northeast, flows through the Etropole Valley and enters in a gorge after the village of Laga. At the village of Malki Iskar it turns to the northeast, flows through the Dzhurkovo Valley and downstream of the village of Vidrare it turns westwards and enter another gorge. It again changes direction to the north at Kalugerovo, its valley widens and flows into the Iskar at an altitude of 146 m near the town of Roman.

Its drainage basin covers a territory of 1,284 km^{2} or 14.9% of Iskar's total. It drains the entire northeastern regions of Sofia Province. It largest tributary is the Bebresh (46 km).

The Malki Iskar has rain-snow feed with high water in April–June and low water in August–October. The average annual discharge at the village of Svode is 9.1 m^{3}/s.

== Settlements and economy ==
The river flows in Sofia and Vratsa Provinces. There are ten settlements along its course: the town of Etropole and the villages of Laga and Malki Iskar in Etropole Municipality, and the villages of Dzhurovo, Vidrare, Kalugerovo and Svode in Pravets Municipality, and the village of Sredni Rat and Karash and the town of Roman in Roman Municipality. In its upper course a 38.4 km stretch of the second class II-37 road Yablanitsa–Pazardzhik–Dospat follows the river from the vicinity of its source close to the Zlatitsa Pass to Dzhurovo. Along its lower course is a 28.4 km stretch of the third class III-308 road Osikovska Lakavitsa–Roman, between Kalugerovo and Roman. Significant part of its waters are utilised for industrial needs, especially the large Elatsite copper mine, which made the river prone to pollution until a treatment plant was put into operation in 2009. To a lesser extend, the waters are used for irrigation, mainly along the lower course of Malki Iskar.

== Gallery ==
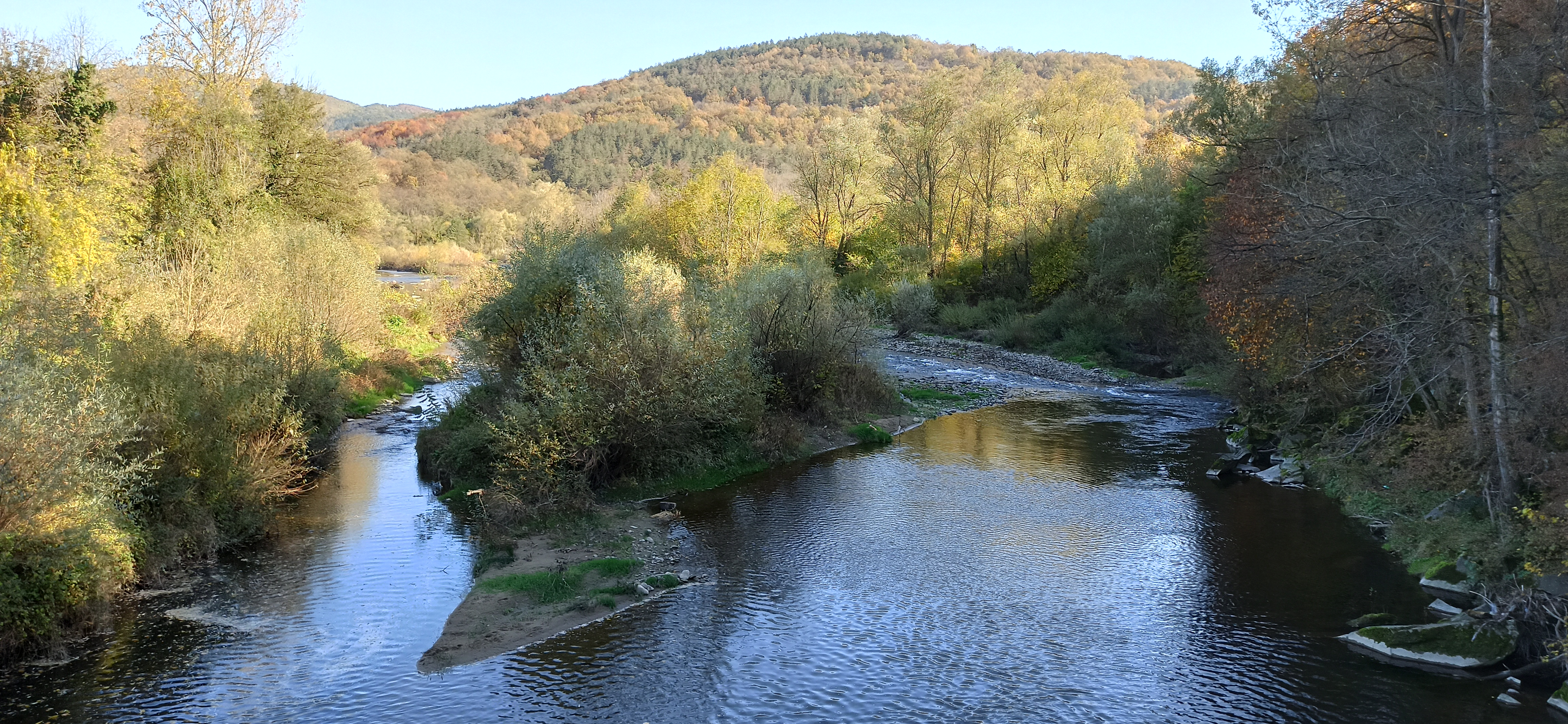

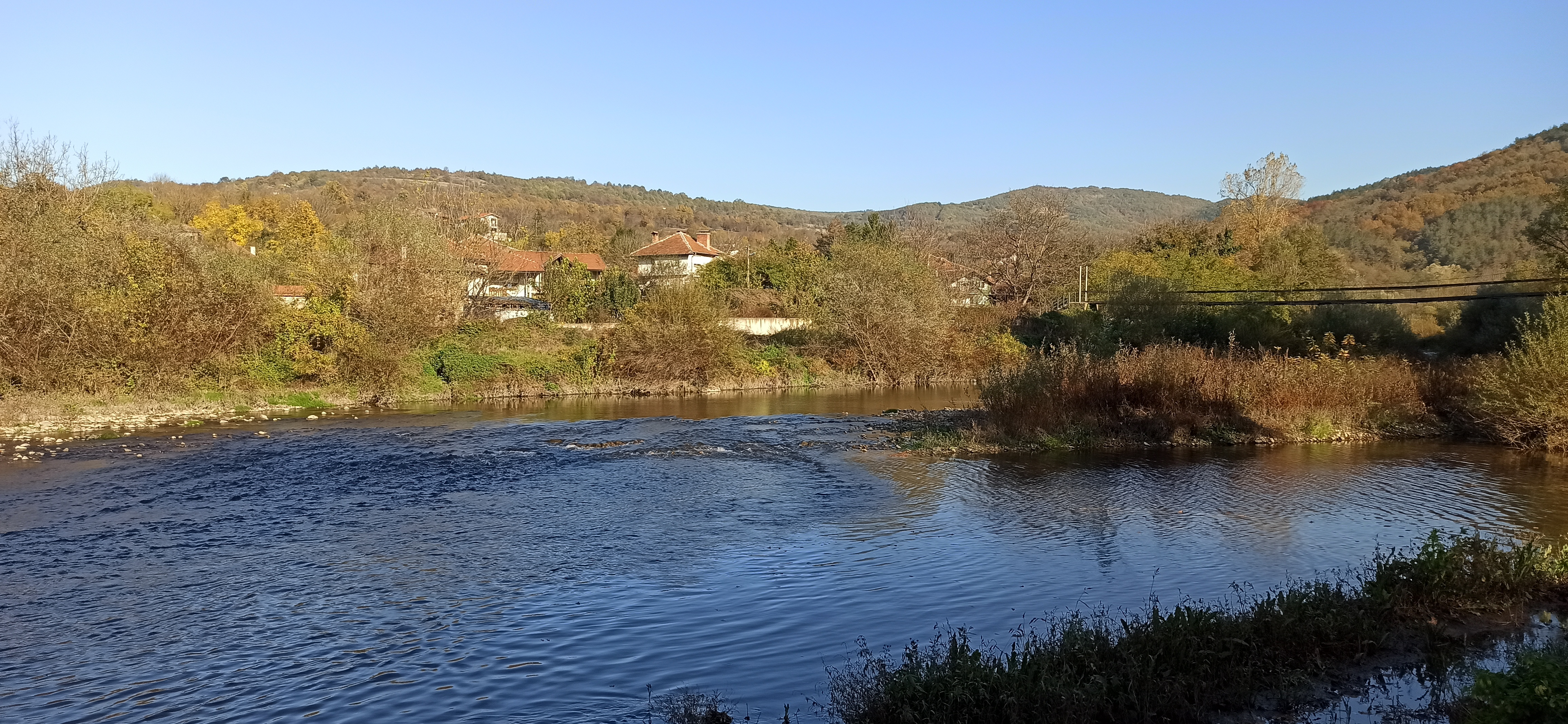

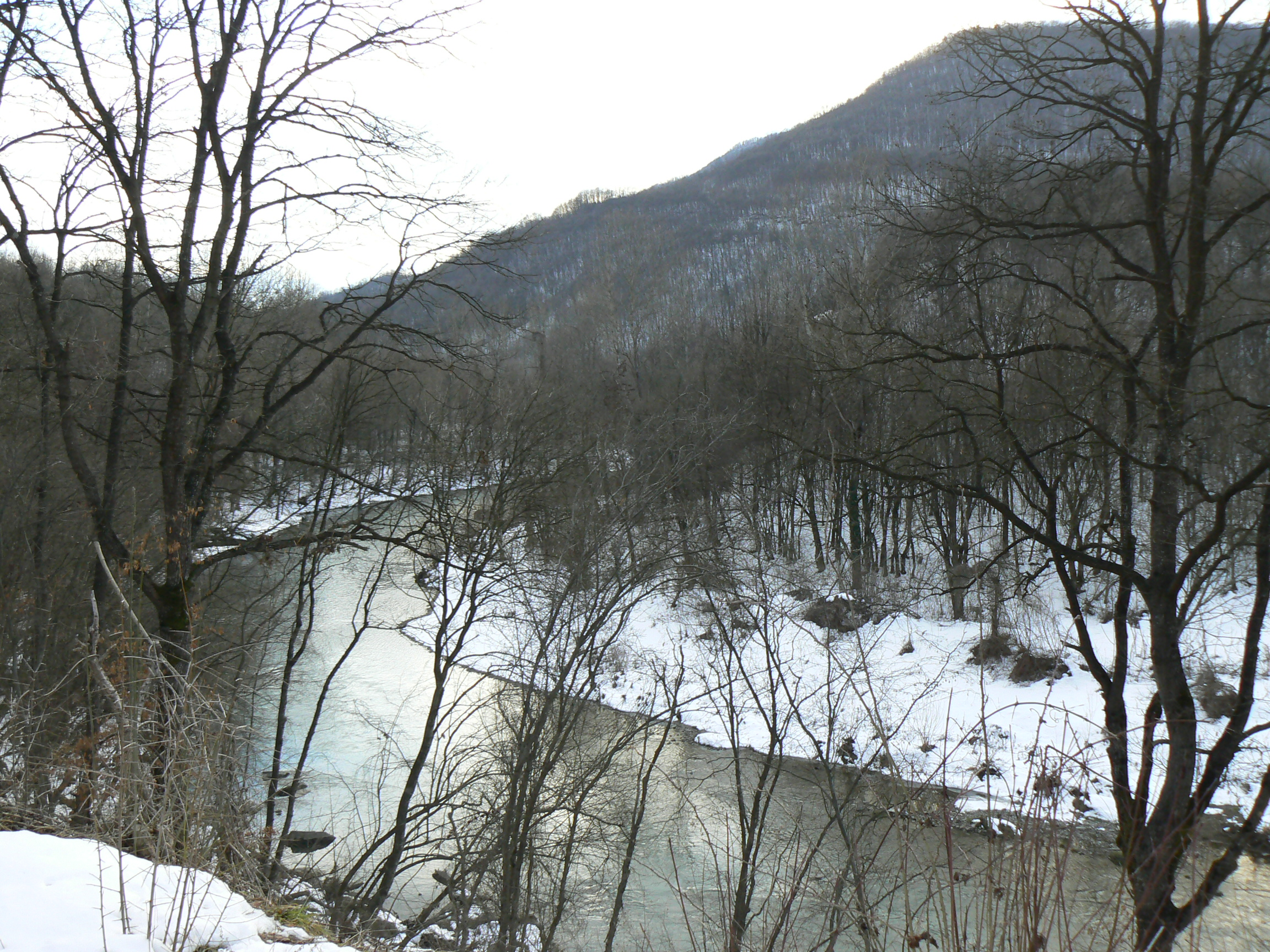
