= Pazardzhik Railway Station =

Railway Station in Pazardzhik

Pazardzhik Railway Station Железопътна гара Пазарджик
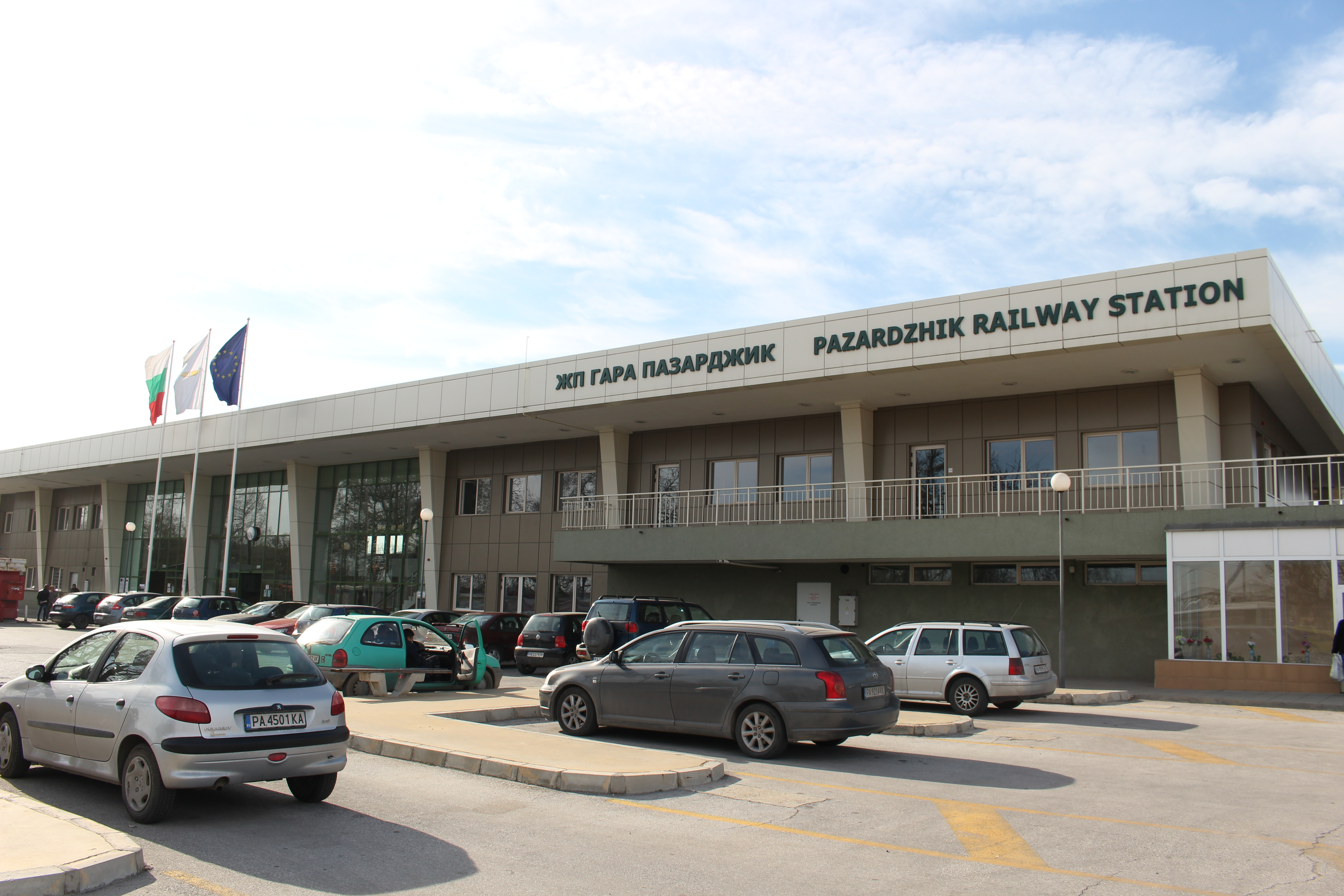
- The station in 2019

General information
- Location: ul. Rositsa; Pazardzhik, Bulgaria
- Coordinates: 42°10′8″N 24°19′20″E
- Owner: NRIC
- Platforms: 4
- Tracks: 5

Construction
- Parking: Yes
- Cycle facilities: Yes

History
- Opened: Somewhere around 1870-1874
Location

Pazardzhik Railway Station (Bulgarian: Железопътна гара Пазарджик, romanized: Zhelezopatna gara Pazardzhik) is a railway station located in the southern area of Pazardzhik, Bulgaria and serving as the main station for both the city and its municipality.

== History ==
It was founded between 1870 and 1874, where between this timeline, the Lyubimets-Belovo railway line was created.

The station is considered important for Pazardzhik, due to being the main place where an Armenian telegraphist Ovanes Sovadzhian changed the text of the telegram, as Süleyman Hüsnü Pasha didn't understand morse code. In return, the city was saved from total annihilation.

During communism in Bulgaria, the previous building was demolished and a new one was constructed.

=== Renovation ===
On 12 February 2014, a renovation project began, which was worth around 4,000,000 BGN. The project was an objective to entirely renovate the architecture, with better plumbing, energy efficiency, high quality materials. The renovated railway station was opened in 2017.
