= Etropole Municipality =

Coordinates: 42°49′44″N 23°59′33″E

Etropole Municipality Община Етрополе
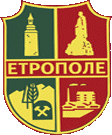
- Coat of arms

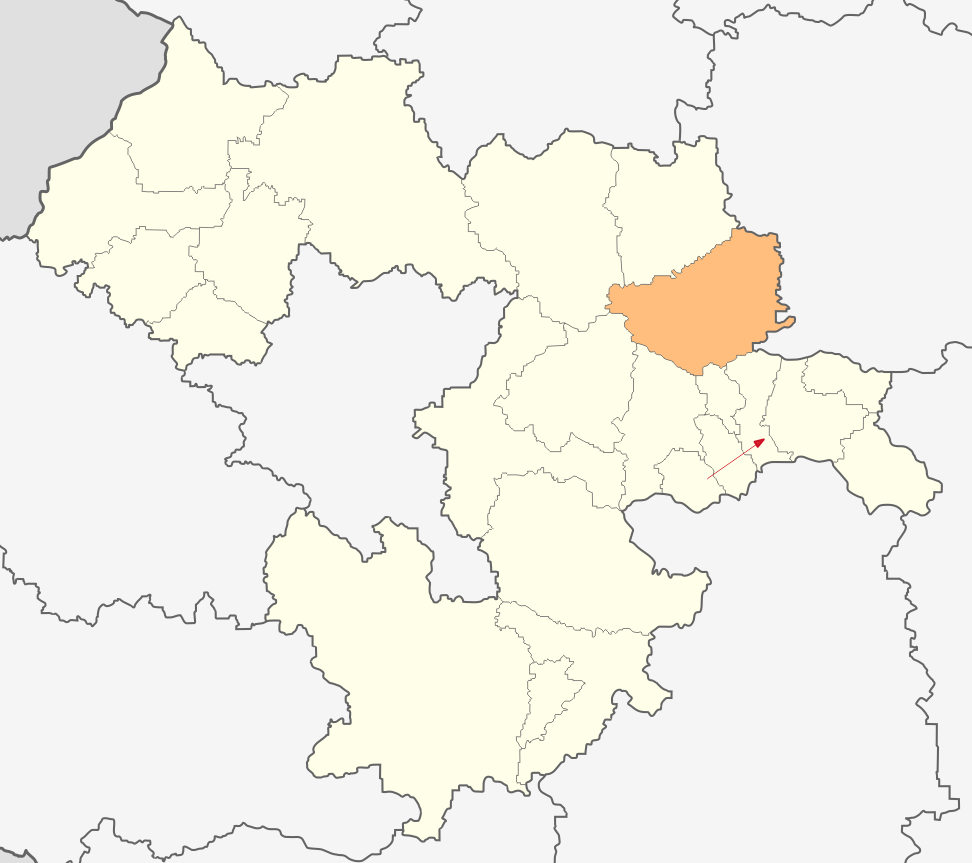
- Country: Bulgaria
- Province: Sofia Province
- Seat: Etropole

Area
  - Total: 371.7 km^{2} (143.5 sq mi)

Population (2024)
  - Total: 10,445
  - Density: 28.10/km^{2} (72.78/sq mi)
- Website: etropole.bg

Etropole Municipality (Bulgarian: Община Етрополе) is a municipality in Sofia Province, western central Bulgaria. Covering a territory of 371.7 km^{2}, it is the seventh largest of the 22 municipalities in the province and takes 5.25% of its total area.

== Geography ==
The relief of the municipality is mostly mountainous and hilly. To the north lies the hilly fore-Balkan, a mountainous chain straddling north of and in parallel with the Balkan Mountains. To the south rise the northern slopes of the main ridge of the Balkan Mountains that include the highest point of Etropole Municipality, the summit of Sveshtiplaz (1,888 m). In the southern reaches is the northern half of the Zlatitsa Pass that crosses the mountains, leading to the Zlatitsa–Pirdop Valley.

Most of the municipality is drained by the river Malki Iskar, a right and also largest tributary of the Iskar of the Danube drainage.

== Transport ==
Etropole Municipality is served by three roads of the national network with a total length of 57.5 km, as well as local roads, including a 33.6 km stretch of the second class II-37 road Dzhurovo–Panagyurishte–Pazardzhik–Dospat, the last 3.5 km of the third class III-3009 road, and the first 20.4 km of the third class III-3701 road. The municipal center Etropole lies some 87 km northeast of the capital Sofia, 25 km southeast of Botevgrad and 37 km northwest of Zlatitsa.

== Demography ==
Historical population
Year	Pop.	±%
1934	9,417	—
1946	10,509	+11.6%
1956	11,768	+12.0%
1965	13,757	+16.9%
1975	14,262	+3.7%
1985	15,180	+6.4%
1992	15,178	−0.0%
2001	13,733	−9.5%
2011	12,047	−12.3%
2021	10,888	−9.6%
Source: National Statistics Institute

As of 2024 the population of Etropole Municipality is 10,445, living in one town and nine villages:

- Boykovets
- Brusen
- Gorunaka
- Etropole
- Lopyan
- Laga
- Malki Iskar
- Oselna
- Ribaritsa
- Yamna

== Gallery ==
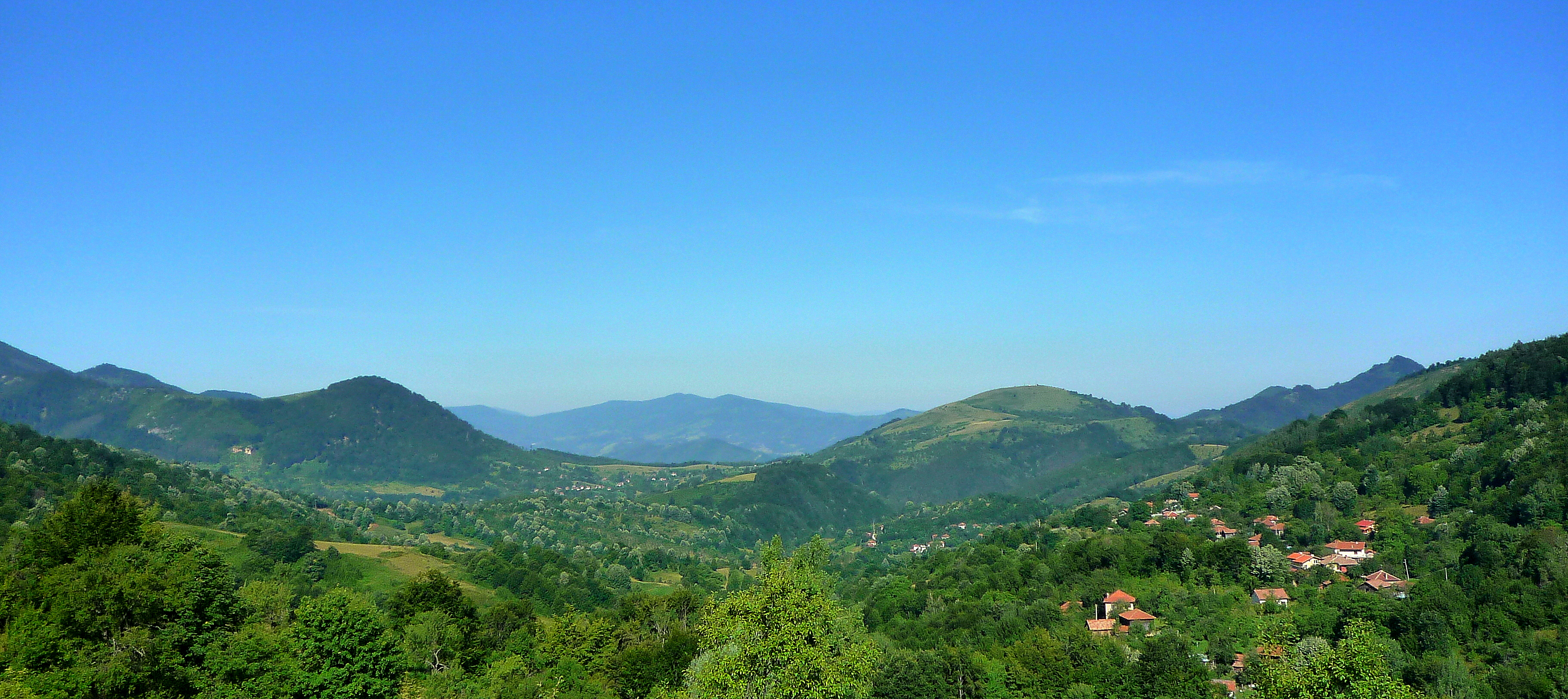
A landscape of the municipality

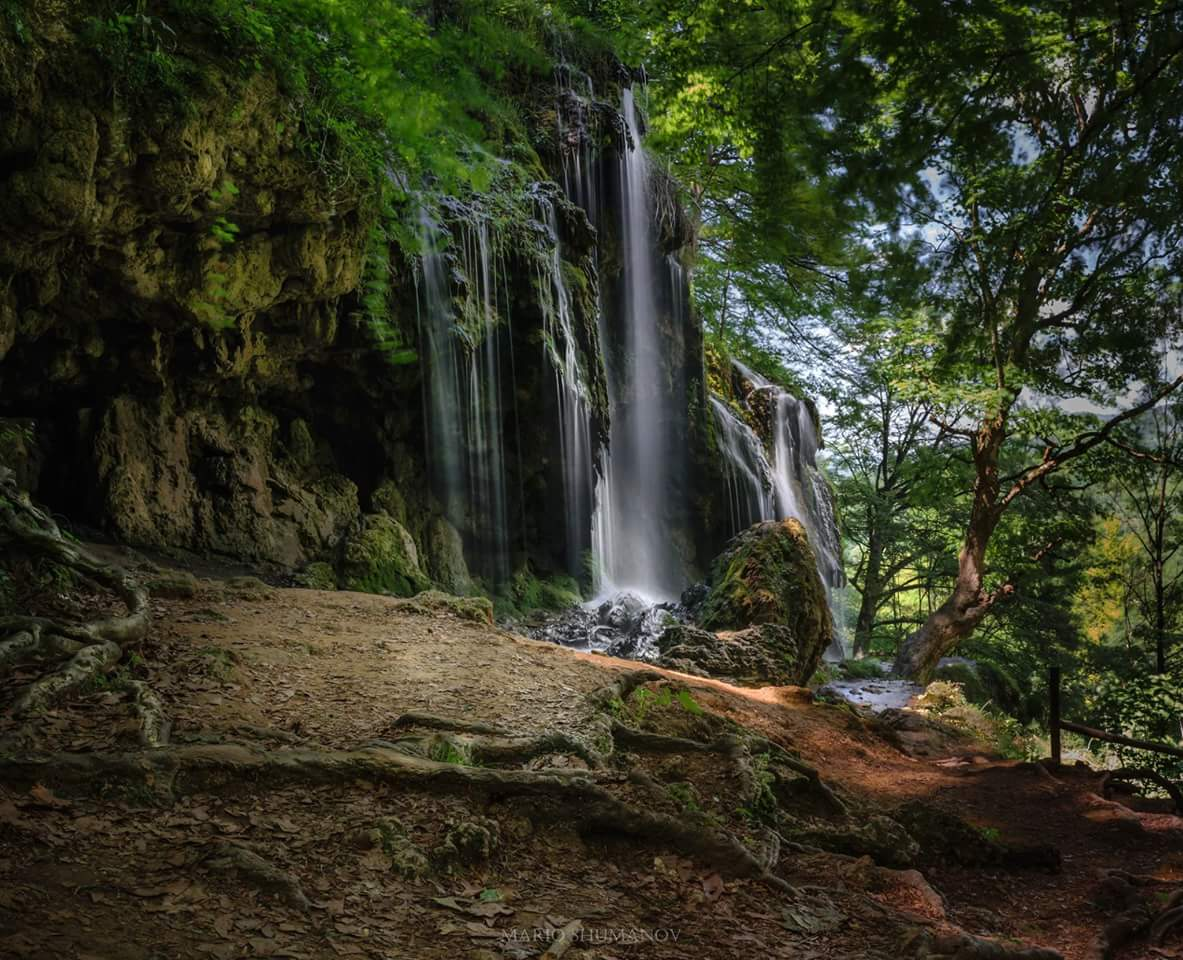
Etropole Waterfall

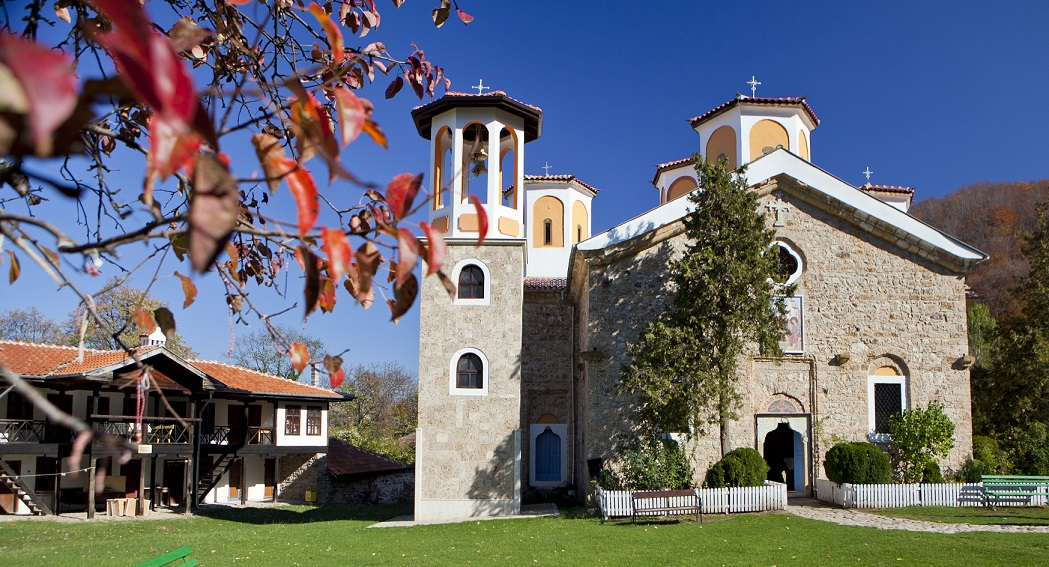
Etropole Monastery

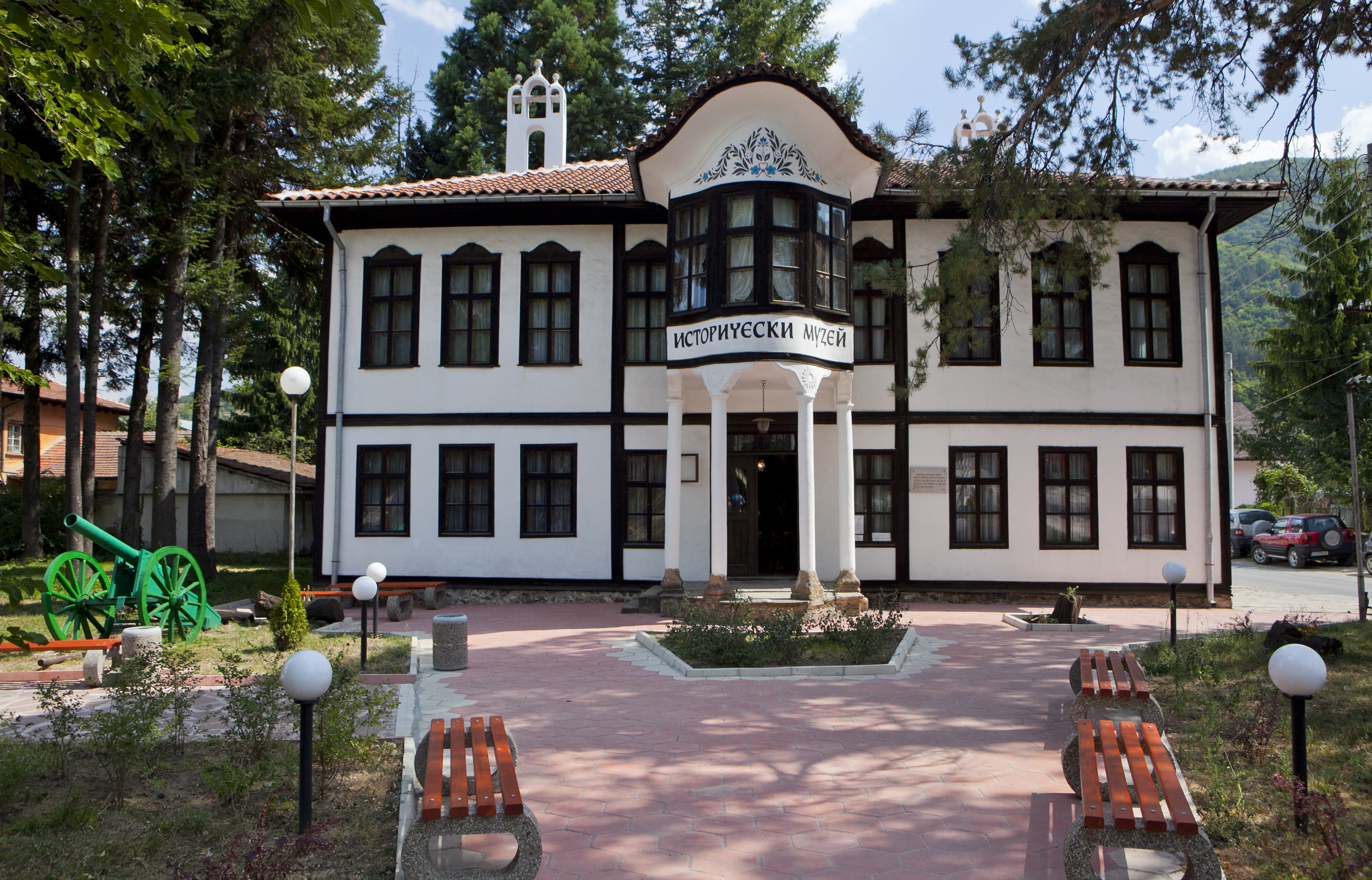
Etropole Museum of History
