= Bozhenishki Urvich =

Fortress near Bozhenitsa village, Bulgaria

- Near Bozhenitsa, Botevgrad Municipality, Bulgaria
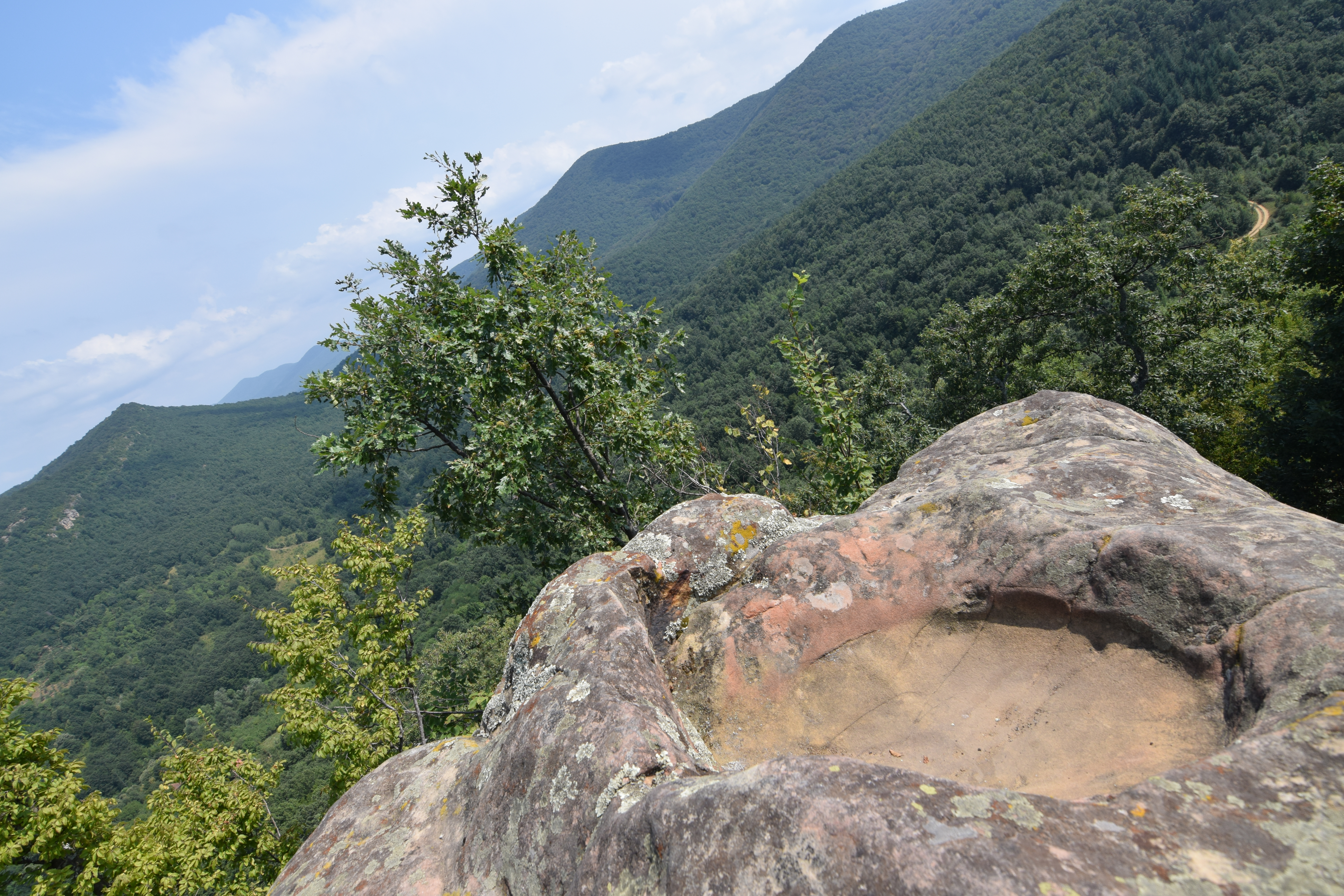

Site information
- Type: Fortress
- Open to the public: Yes
- Condition: Ruined

Location
- Height: 750 m

Site history
- Built: 5th–6th century
- Materials: Stone

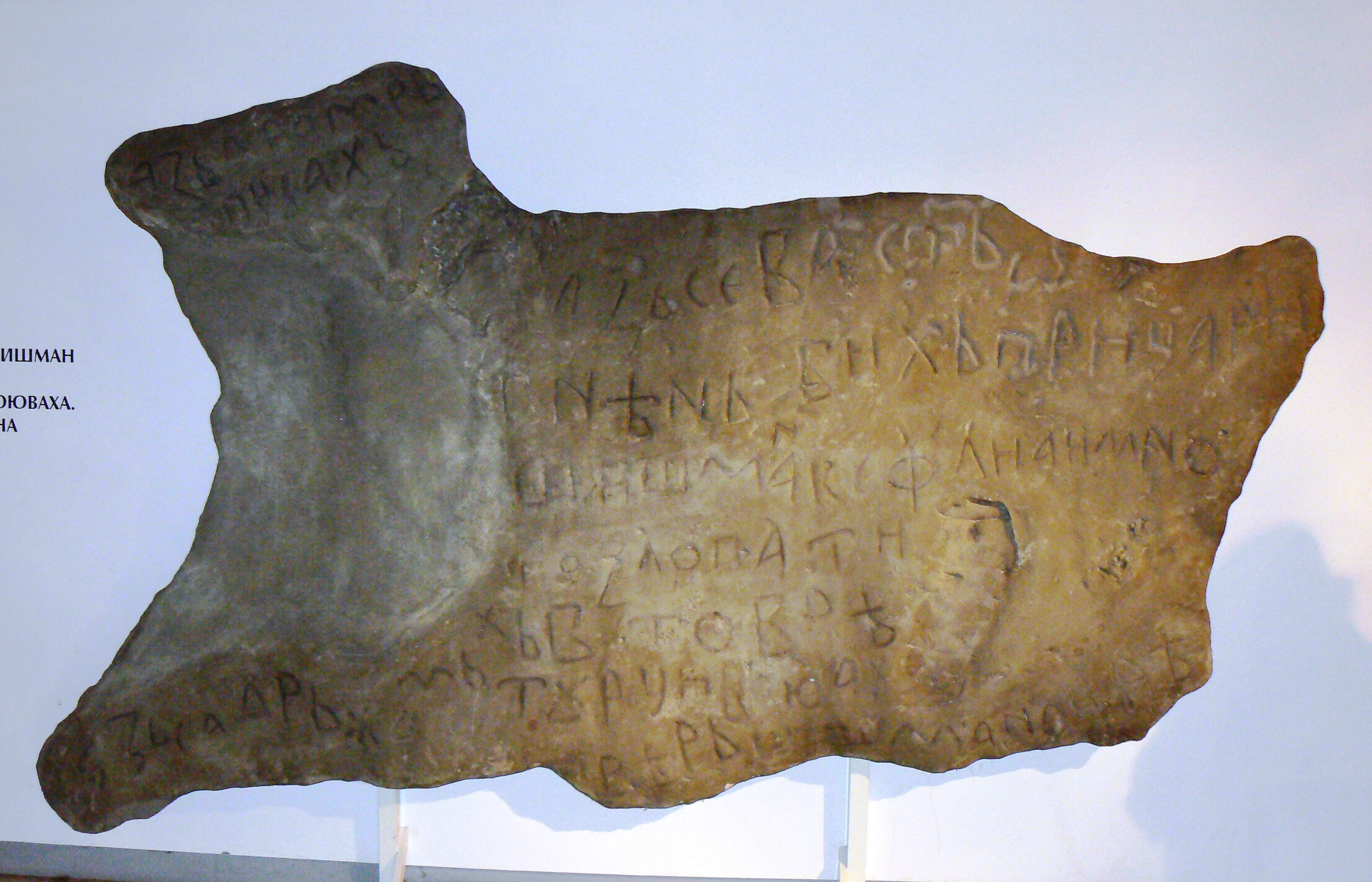
Copy of the Inscription of Sevast Ognyan in the National History Museum of Bulgaria

Bozhenishki Urvich is a ruined fortress on the northern slopes of Lakavishki Ridge in the western Balkan Mountains/Stara Planina (Old Mountain), 3 km south of village Bozhenitsa and 20 km from the town of Botevgrad, Bulgaria. It is situated at an elevation of 750 m.

An asphalt road leads to the resting base "Urvich". From there, a marked path leads to the remains of the fortress. The path takes around 20 minutes by foot. The secrets of the fortress were discovered in 1918, when, after a storm, people discovered a medieval inscription among the roots of a fallen tree.

The Bozhenishki inscription was first read and interpreted by Academician Petar Mutafchiev. He noted that the author (the hewer) of the inscription "has not thought about the size of the surface. He started with large letters and started decreasing the size of the letters and increasing the length of the rows as he noticed there is not enough space...". The inscription reads:

Аз Драгомир писах. Аз, севаст Огнян, бях при цар Шишман кефалия и много зло патих. В това време турците воюваха. Аз поддържах вярата на Шишмана царя. (Bulgarian)
"I, Dragomir, had written. I, sevast Ognyan, was a kephale of Emperor Shishman and took a great evil. At the same time Turks were fighting. I kept my faith in Emperor Shishman."

According to the explorers, "with its exclusiveness, from both a historical and a philological point of view, the Bozhenishki inscription of sevast Ognyan enriches the «stone archive» of Medieval Bulgaria.".

According to archaeological studies conducted in 1972, the place has been inhabited since the prehistory, but the first fortress equipment dates from around the 5th-6th centuries, when it represented a unit of the Early Byzantine defense system. The peak of fortress development was around 13-14 centuries during the Second Bulgarian Empire, when the outer wall was erected. The wall acted as a barrier from the north, where the only entrance from the village of Bozhenitsa is situated.

By the end of the 14th century, the fortress served as the headquarters of boyar Ognen (Ognyan), a local governor (kephale) during the rule of Emperor Ivan Shishman (r. 1371–1395). One of the most notable points of interest is a 10-meter-deep water cistern, as well as the cave chapel inside the fortress. A trove of silver coins, dating from the reign of Ivan Shishman, was uncovered near the gates at the depth of 0.2-1.5 m. Hundreds of arrow and spear heads, as well as skeletons of soldiers, have been discovered buried near the walls. They testify to the fight between sevast Ognyan and the Turks around 1395.

In 1966 the medieval fortress was declared as a site of national significance.
