= II-37 road (Bulgaria) =

Road in Bulgaria

Republic Road I-37
- Републикански път I-37

Route information
- Length: 225.6 km (140.2 mi)

Major junctions
- From: I-3 near Dzhurovo
- To: Barutin

Location
- Country: Bulgaria
- Towns: Zlatitsa, Panagyurishte, Pazardzhik, Peshtera, Batak, Dospat

Highway system
- Highways in Bulgaria

Republican Road II-37 (Bulgarian: Републикански път II-37) is a 2nd class road in Bulgaria, running in direction north–south through the territory of Sofia, Pazardzhik and Smolyan Provinces. Its length is 225.6 km and is the longest 2nd class road in the country.

== Route description ==
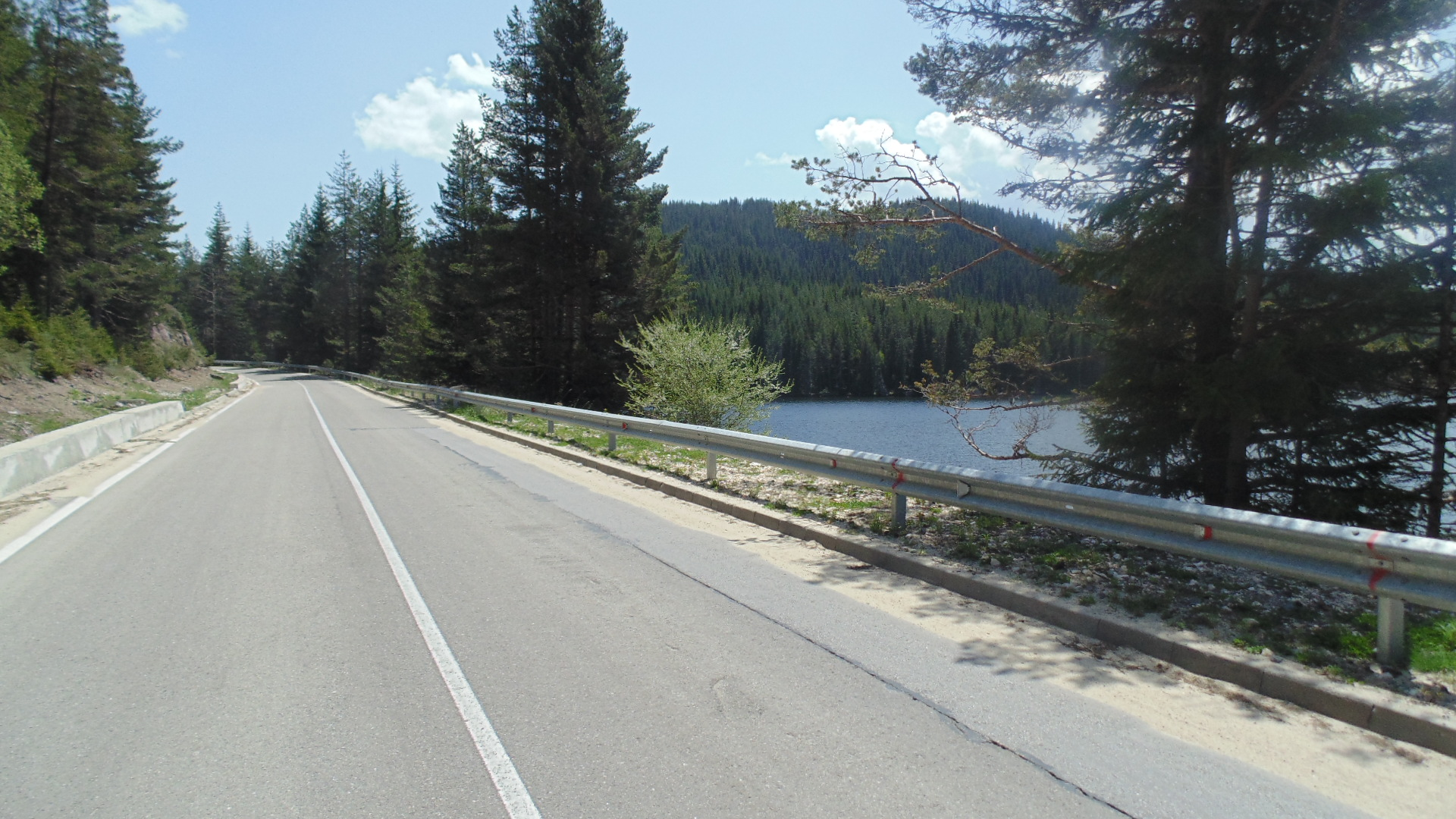
Road II-37 at Golyam Beglik

The road starts at Km 171.7 of the first class I-3 road at the village of Dzhurovo and proceeds south along the valley of the river Malki Iskar, where it passes through the villages of Malki Iskar and Laga. It goes through the center of the town of Etropole, continues along the upper of valley of the Malki Iskar and near its source it cuts through the Balkan Mountains via the serpentine Zlatitsa Pass (1,365 m). Exiting the pass, it descends to the village of Tsarkvishte and enters the Zlatitsa–Pirdop Valley, which it bisects from north to south, passing through the town of Zlatitsa and over the river Topolnitsa. At Zlatitsa there is an intersection with the first class I-6 road. The road then ascends along the northern slopes of the Sredna Gora mountain range, which it overcomes at the village of Panagyurski kolonii, and after a 15 km descent reaches the town of Panagyurishte. From the town it follows the valley of the Luda Yana, passing through the villages of Bata, Popintsi, Levski and Sbor, where it exits the southern slopes of Sredna Gora and enter the western parts of the Upper Thracian Plain.

The road then passes through the village of Gelemenovo, forms a junction with the Trakia motorway at Km 90 of the motorway, and reaches the city of Pazardzhik, the largest settlement along its route, where it intersects with the first class I-8 road. It passes through the western neighbourhoods of the city, crosses the river Maritsa, passes through the village of Glavinitsa and enters the western Rhodope Mountains, passing through Radilovo and Peshtera. From Peshtera it enters the gorge of the river Stara reka until the town of Batak. The road then reaches the Batak Reservoir and begins a long gradual ascend of the Batak Mountain, passing by the reservoirs of Beglika, Golyam Beglik and Shiroka Polyana via the Dospat Pass (1,600 m). It then passes through the Veliyshko–Videnishki ridge of the Rhodopes and descents to the valley of the river Dospat, follows the eastern shores of the Dospat Reservoir and reaches the town of Dospat. The road continues for another 6 km south of the town until its terminus at the village of Barutin.
