= Roman Municipality =

Coordinates: 43°09′N 23°55′E

Roman Municipality Община Роман
- Municipality
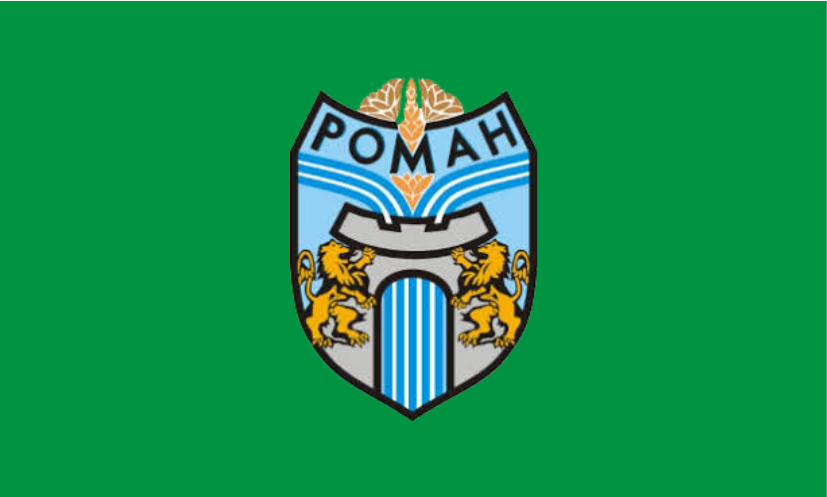
- Flag

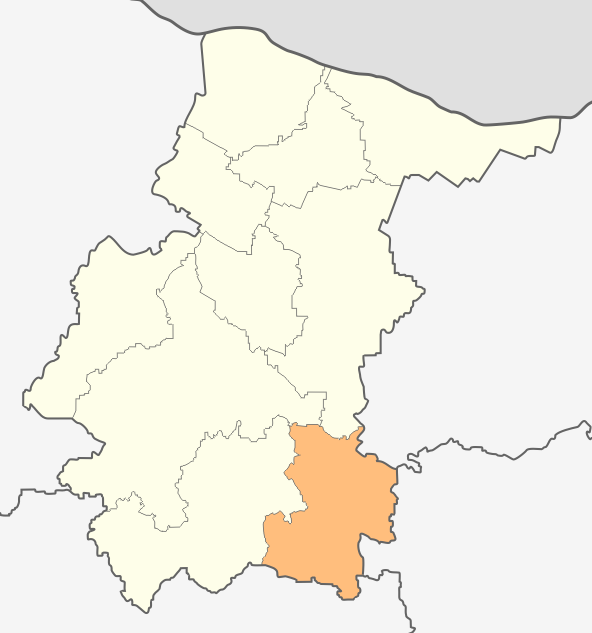
- Country: Bulgaria
- Province: Vratsa Province
- Seat: Roman

Roman Municipality is a municipality in Vratsa Province, Bulgaria.

== Demography ==
=== Religion ===
According to the latest Bulgarian census of 2011, the religious composition, among those who answered the optional question on religious identification, was the following:

Religious composition of Roman Municipality
Orthodox Christianity	86.6%
Catholicism	0.8%
Protestantism	0.4%
Islam	0.2%
No religion	4.8%
Prefer not to answer, others and indefinable	7.2%

About 4,200 people, or more than 67%, did not state a religion during the 2011 census. The remainder (~33%) is mostly Bulgarian Orthodox (~87%).
