= Dzhurovo =

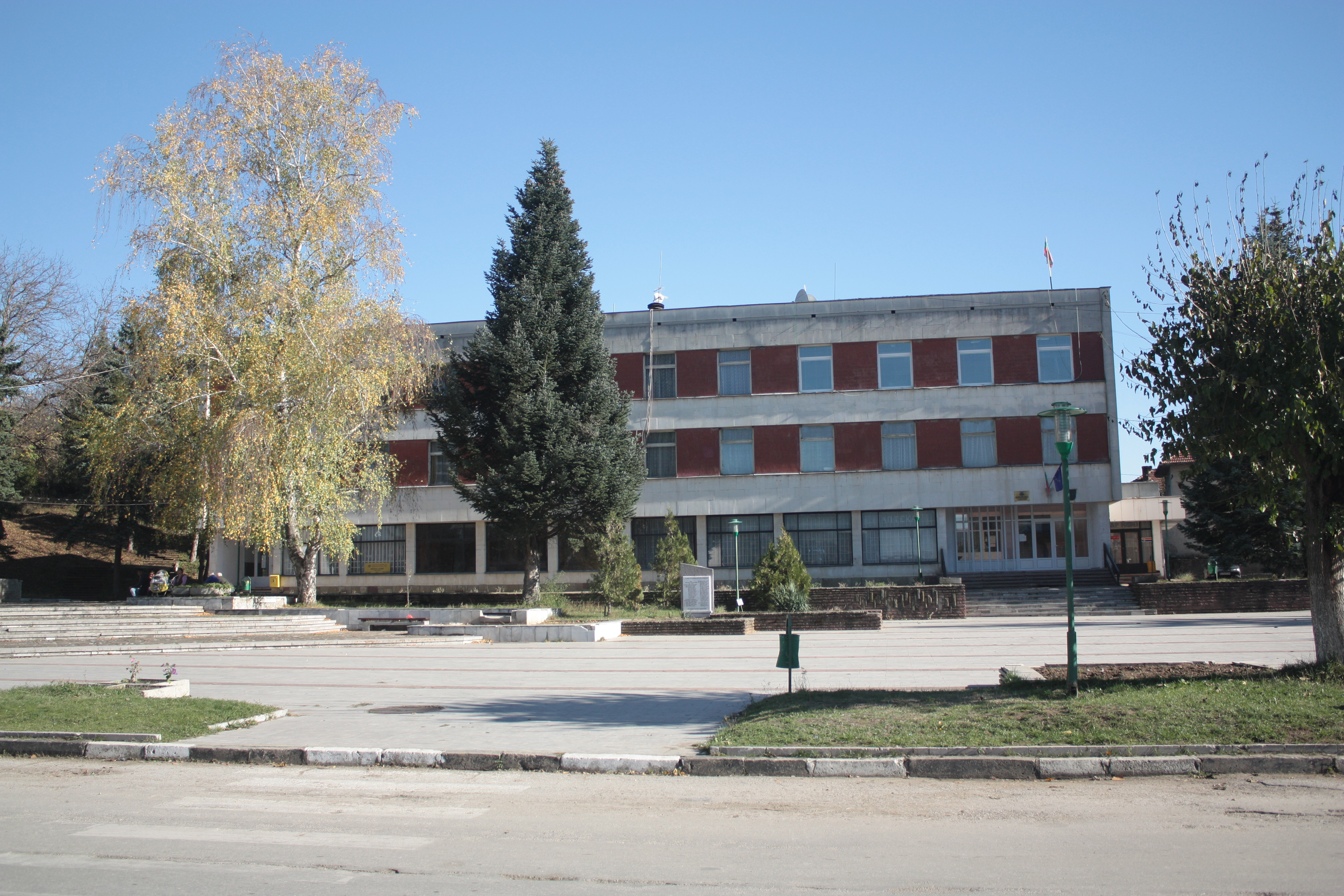

- Location within Bulgaria
- Coordinates: 42°55′59″N 24°3′0″E
- Country: Bulgaria
- Province: Sofia

Dzhurovo is a village in western Bulgaria. It is situated in Pravets Municipality, Sofia Province.
