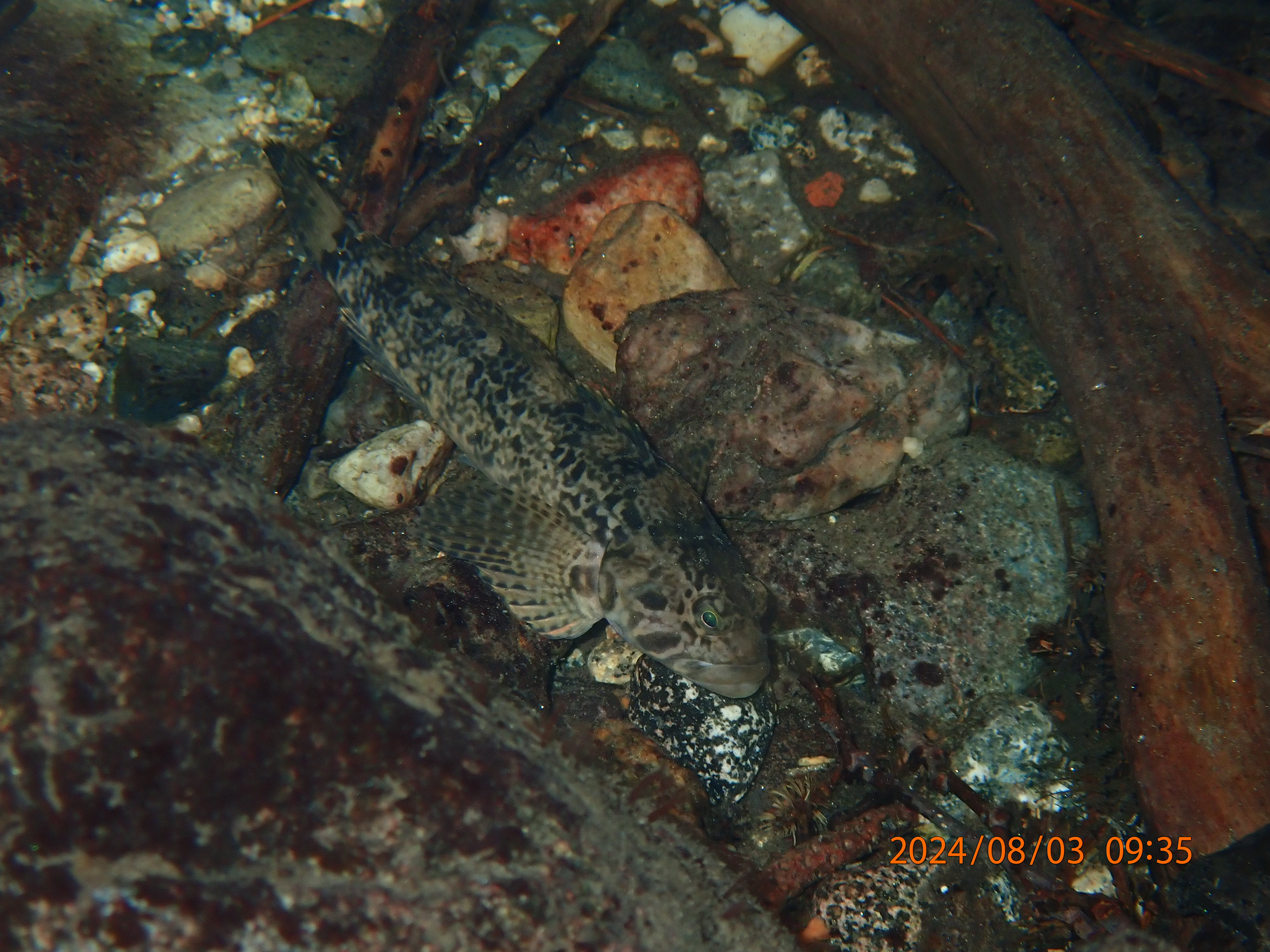
- Lower Klamath marbled sculpin observed in a Scott River tributary. Photo by Harrison Morrow.

Conservation status
- Least Concern (IUCN 3.1)

Scientific classification
- Kingdom: Animalia
- Phylum: Chordata
- Class: Actinopterygii
- Order: Perciformes
- Suborder: Cottoidei
- Family: Cottidae
- Genus: Cottus
- Species: C. klamathensis

Binomial name
- Cottus klamathensis C. H. Gilbert, 1898

= Marbled sculpin =

Species of fish

The marbled sculpin (Cottus klamathensis) is a species of sculpin found in the Klamath and Pit River drainages in northern California and southern Oregon. Three subspecies have been identified: the upper Klamath marbled sculpin (C.k. klamathensis), which occurs in the Klamath River watershed above Klamath Falls; the lower Klamath marbled sculpin (C.k. polyporus), which occurs in the Klamath River watershed downstream of Iron Gate Dam; and the bigeye marbled sculpin (C.k. macrops), which inhabits the Pit River Watershed. However, genetic analysis performed in 2012 indicated minimal difference between individuals from each of these three regions.

== Description ==
Marbled sculpins, like other sculpin species, have a large, flat head and large, fan-like pectoral fins. They have a striking mottled coloration with patches of black and various shades of brown. In Inland Fishes of California (2002), Peter Moyle describes their physical characteristics as follows:

"Marbled sculpins can be distinguished by the following suite of characteristics: 7-8 dorsal fin spines, broadly joined dorsal fins, incomplete lateral line with 15-28 pores, smooth skin (except for a small patch of prickles in some populations), 2 chin pores, absent palatine teeth, and only 1 well-developed preopercular spine (although one or two inconspicuous protruberances [sic] may be present below it) (1). In addition they have a wide head, with widely separated eyes, a blunt snout, a maxillary bone that does not reach the posterior edge of the eye, and usually no conspicuous dark patch on the rear portion of the first dorsal, although a band may run across most of the fin. There are 7-8 spines in the first dorsal fin, 18-22 rays in the second dorsal fin, 13-15 anal fin rays, 14-16 pectoral fin rays, and 11-12 principal rays in the caudal fin. The pelvic fins have four "elements" and may or may not reach the vent when depressed. Prickling may be well developed on young fish but is confined to a small region behind the pectoral fins in adults or is absent. The pectoral fins often appear checkered, with alternating dark and light spots on the rays."

The lower Klamath marbled sculpin can be distinguished from the other subspecies by the number of lateral line pores. C.k. polyporus possess 22-28 pores, while C.k. klamathensis and C.k. macrops have 15-22. The bigeye marbled sculpin is unique in its having very few or completely lacking axillary prickles. The upper Klamath marbled sculpin, in addition to being the only of the three to have significant amounts of axillary prickles and 15-22 lateral line pores, also has a shorter head and postorbital length relative to its "consubspecifics". C.k. macrops are also generally darker and less strikingly marbled than the Klamath River subspecies.

Bigeye marbled sculpin individuals over 110 mm (4.3 in) in length have been found, although it is uncommon for them to exceed 80 mm (3.1 in).

== Distribution ==
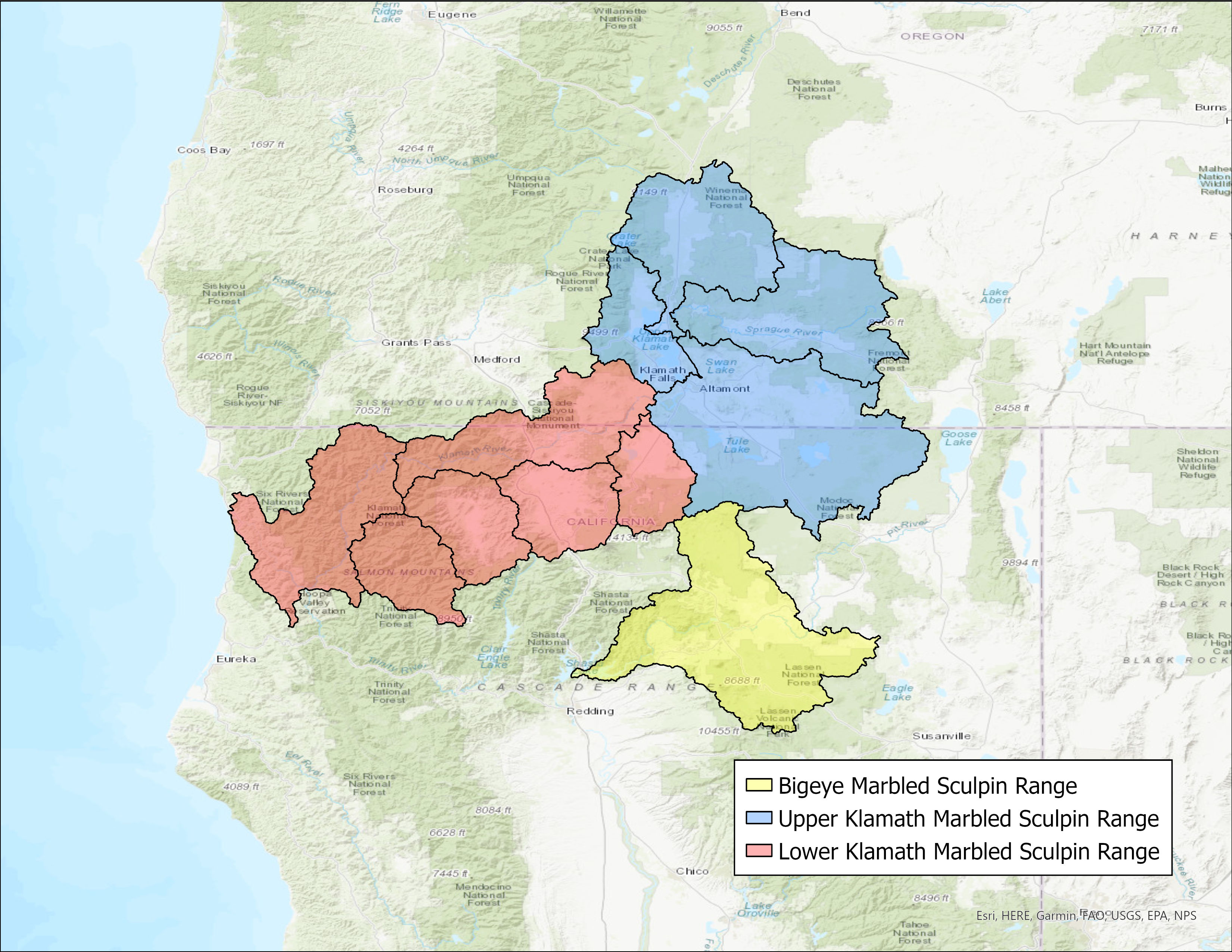
HUC8 watershed-level range map of the three marbled sculpin subspecies. Made by Harrison Morrow using ESRI ArcGIS Pro, based on data from Moyle (2002).

Moyle states that the lower Klamath marbled sculpin occurs in the mainstem Klamath River and its tributaries from the Trinity River confluence up to Iron Gate Dam, and that the upper Klamath marbled sculpin inhabits the watershed upstream of Klamath Falls. However, it is likely that this species has also been present in tributaries to the Klamath River between Iron Gate Dam and Klamath Falls. With the removal of four Klamath dams in 2024, populations downstream of the Iron Gate Dam site will now be connected to further upstream populations for the first time since 1918. Surveys of the Lost River watershed in the upper Klamath basin found marbled sculpin to only be occupying a few small headwater streams. Bigeye marbled sculpin are found in the lower Pit River watershed, including tributaries such as Hat Creek, Burney Creek and the Fall River.

=== Habitat preference ===
Bigeye marbled sculpin prefer run or pool habitat, with fine substrate capable of supporting aquatic plants. They are often found in deeper areas of a habitat next to cover features such as aquatic vegetation. A study of the thermal tolerances of the three species found that C.k. macrops preferred temperatures ranging from 11.1 to 14.7 °C (52.0 to 58.5 °F), and extended exposure to temperatures above 25 °C (77 °F) was shown to be lethal. Regarding C.k. klamathensis, a study of habitat use in Oregon streams found these marbled sculpins to be most abundant in streams where summer temperatures ranged from 15–20 °C (59–68 °F), substrates were coarse, and channel widths were greater than 10 metres (33 ft). Much less is known about the lower Klamath marbled sculpin's habitat use, although they are regularly found in deep, constructed pool habitats in tributaries to the Scott River.

=== Overlap with other sculpin species ===
Marbled sculpin in the Pit River watershed coexist with Pit sculpin (Cottus pitensis) and rough sculpin (Cottus asperrimus). Upper Klamath marbled sculpin are one of three sculpin species in the upper Klamath region, which also includes slender sculpin (Cottus tenuis) and Klamath Lake sculpin (Cottus princeps). In addition to C.k. polyporus, the lower Klamath River hosts prickly sculpin (Cottus asper) and coastrange sculpin (Cottus aleuticus), although the lower Klamath marbled sculpin may only exist further upstream than these other two species. Moyle postulates that C.k. polyporus moved into the lower river after geohydrologic shifts in the Pleistocene caused increased spill over from Upper Klamath Lake and the eventual carving of a permanent channel connecting to the Klamath River.

== Biology ==
Bigeye marbled sculpin mature sexually after around two years, and spawning takes place in February and March. Females produce 139-650 eggs, which are deposited as adhesive clusters under flat rocks alongside embryos from other females. Males guard these nests, which have been found to include 826-2,200 embryos.

At the time of emergence, larvae range from 6-8 mm in total length. They average 39 mm (standard length) at the end of their first year, then 55 mm, 62 mm, 70 mm, and 79 mm at the end of each successive year, respectively. Around five years appears to be the maximum lifespan.

There is little information in the literature regarding diets and feeding behavior of marbled sculpin. Other sculpin species present in the region primarily feed on aquatic insect larvae and amphipods. Sculpins have a reputation for consuming salmon and trout eggs following spawning events, but there is little evidence for this behavior in the sculpins of inland northern California outside of an experimental setting.

== Conservation status ==
There is no data available on marbled sculpin population trends. Moyle speculates that marbled sculpin populations in both the Pit and Klamath basins have been negatively impacted by anthropogenic activities such as agricultural diversions and runoff, grazing of riparian areas, introduction of invasive piscivores, etc. The International Union for the Conservation of Nature conducted a status review on marbled sculpin in 2011 and deemed the species' conservation need to be of "Least Concern". However, this report also lacks any real data on the abundance of this species.
