= Cottus scaturigo =

Conservation status
- Vulnerable (IUCN 3.1)

Scientific classification
- Kingdom: Animalia
- Phylum: Chordata
- Class: Actinopterygii
- Order: Perciformes
- Suborder: Cottoidei
- Family: Cottidae
- Genus: Cottus
- Species: C. scaturigo

Binomial name
- Cottus scaturigo Freyhof, Kottelat and Nolte, 2005

Species of fish

Cottus scaturigo, the Timavo sculpin, is a species of freshwater ray-finned fish belonging to the family Cottidae, the typical sculpins. It is endemic to the Timavo Spring in Italy. This species was described as a separate species from the European bullhead (C. gobio) in 2005 by Jörg Freyhof, Maurice Kottelat and Arne W. Nolte. However, the Catalog of Fishes treats this taxon as a synonym of Cottus metae, although FishBase treats it as a separate species. The specific name scaturigo means "spouting water", i.e. a spring, an allusion to the Timavo Spring.
