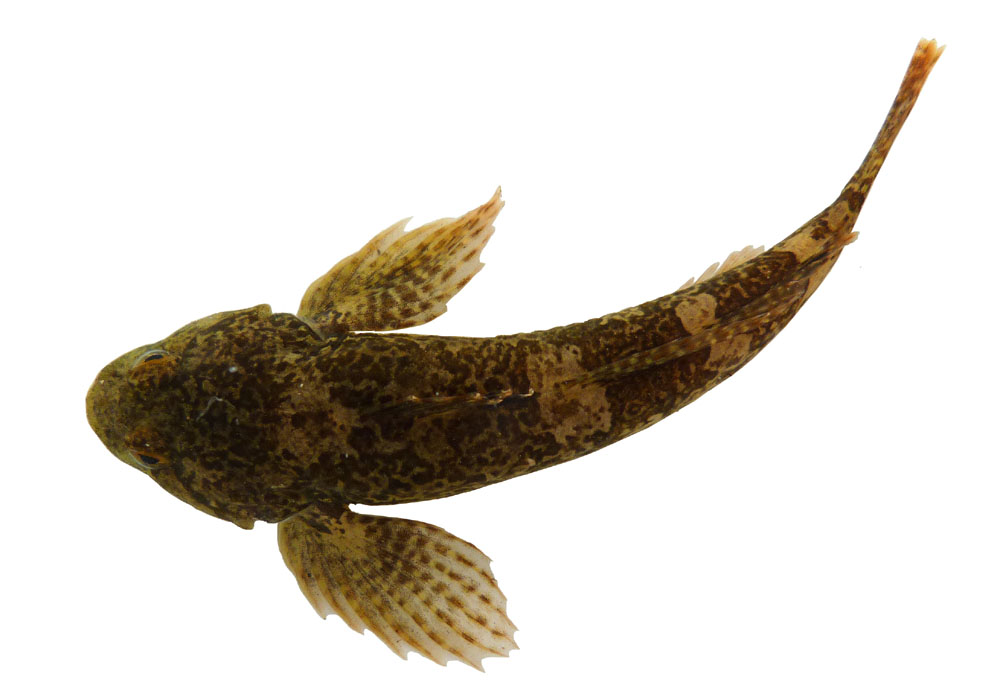

Conservation status
- Near Threatened (IUCN 3.1)

Scientific classification
- Kingdom: Animalia
- Phylum: Chordata
- Class: Actinopterygii
- Order: Perciformes
- Suborder: Cottoidei
- Family: Cottidae
- Genus: Cottus
- Species: C. rondeleti

Binomial name
- Cottus rondeleti Freyhof, Kottelat, Nolte, 2005

= Cottus rondeleti =

Species of fish

Cottus rondeleti is a species of freshwater ray-finned fish belonging to the family Cottidae, the typical sculpins. It is endemic to the coastal Hérault drainage of Southern France. The total known distribution comprises three distinct short stretches of stream, and the species is considered Near Threatened because of habitat destruction and potentially by climate change.

This species was described as a separate species from the European bullhead (C. gobio) in 2005 by Jörg Freyhof, Maurice Kottelat and Arne W. Nolte. The specific name honours Guillaume Rondelet, a pioneer of European ichthyology.

== See also ==
- Cottus petiti
