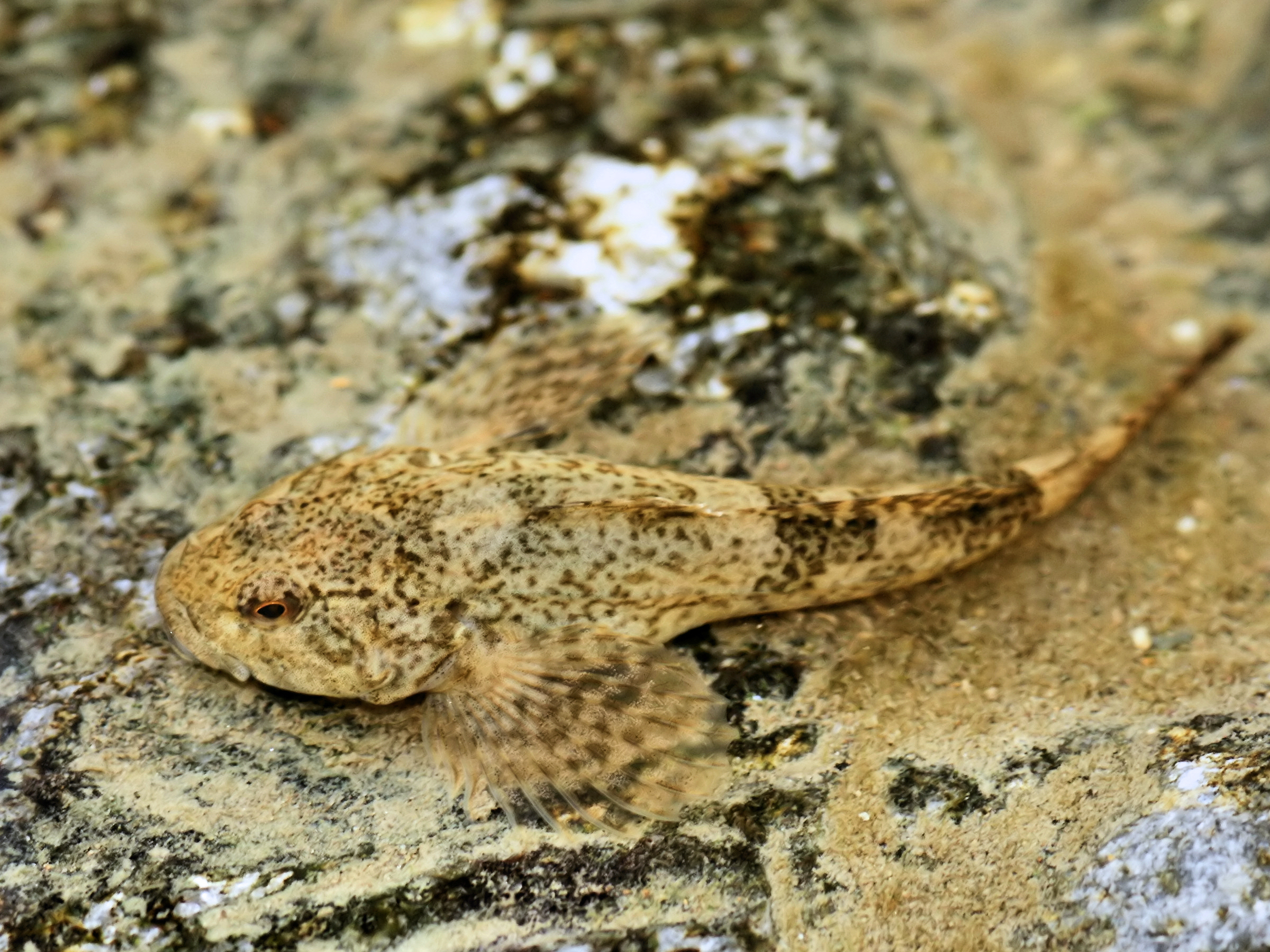

Conservation status
- Least Concern (IUCN 3.1)

Scientific classification
- Kingdom: Animalia
- Phylum: Chordata
- Class: Actinopterygii
- Order: Perciformes
- Suborder: Cottoidei
- Family: Cottidae
- Genus: Cottus
- Species: C. rhenanus

Binomial name
- Cottus rhenanus Freyhof, Kottelat & Nolte, 2005

= Cottus rhenanus =

Species of fish

Cottus rhenanus is a species of freshwater ray-finned fish belonging to the family Cottidae, the typical sculpins. It is found in France, Belgium, Germany, Luxembourg, and the Netherlands. It inhabits the Rhine and Meuse river drainages. It reaches a maximum length of 10 cm (3.9 in). It prefers streams with clear, cool, moderate to swift water and stone substrate. Here, it mostly occurs in the shallow parts of streams. This species was described as a separate species from the European bullhead (C. gobio) in 2005 by Jörg Freyhof, Maurice Kottelat and Arne W. Nolte. The specific name rhenatus means belonging to Rhenus, the Latin name of the River Rhine.
