= Cottus transsilvaniae =

Conservation status
- Endangered (IUCN 3.1)

Scientific classification
- Kingdom: Animalia
- Phylum: Chordata
- Class: Actinopterygii
- Order: Perciformes
- Suborder: Cottoidei
- Family: Cottidae
- Genus: Cottus
- Species: C. transsilvaniae

Binomial name
- Cottus transsilvaniae Freyhof, Kottelat and Nolte, 2005

Species of fish

Cottus transsilvaniae is a species of freshwater ray-finned fish belonging to the family Cottidae, the typical sculpins. It is endemic to Romania in the upper Arges River in the Danube drainage. It reaches a maximum length of 9.7 cm (3.8 in). It prefers rocky shoals and riffles of small upland streams. His species was described as a separate species from the European bullhead (C. gobio) in 2005 by Jörg Freyhof, Maurice Kottelat and Arne W. Nolte. The specific name transsilvaniae means "of Transsilvania", the Latin name for Transylvania.
