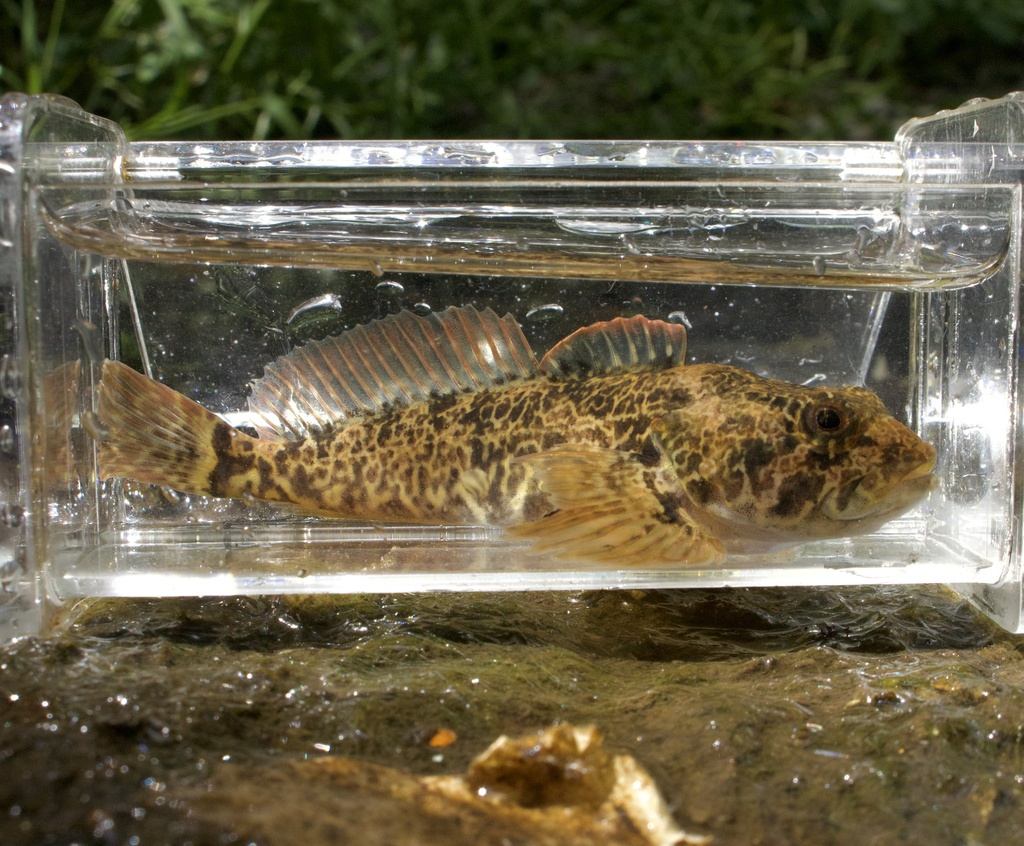

Scientific classification
- Kingdom: Animalia
- Phylum: Chordata
- Class: Actinopterygii
- Order: Perciformes
- Suborder: Cottoidei
- Family: Cottidae
- Genus: Cottus
- Species: C. ohlone

Binomial name
- Cottus ohlone Moyle & Campbell, 2022

= Coastal riffle sculpin =

Species of fish

The coastal riffle sculpin (Cottus ohlone) is a species of freshwater ray-finned fish belonging to the family Cottidae, the typical sculpins. It is endemic to the Coast Range Mountains of California, where it is found in streams draining to the west and southwest. This taxon was considered to be conspecific (the same species) with the inland riffle sculpin (Cottus gulosus) until research published in 2020 by Peter B. Moyle and Matthew A. Campbell showed that it was a separate valid species which was split into two subspecies. One, C.o. pomo, found in the northern Russian River and north San Francisco Bay drainage; and the other, C.o. ohlone, in the southern Santa Clara Valley. The specific name honors the Ohlone people, a Native American group which lived around southern San Francisco Bay and the Santa Clara Valley. The Ohlone name refers to a group of over 50 people who interacted in these areas. It is not listed with a conservation status under the Endangered Species Act.

== Description ==
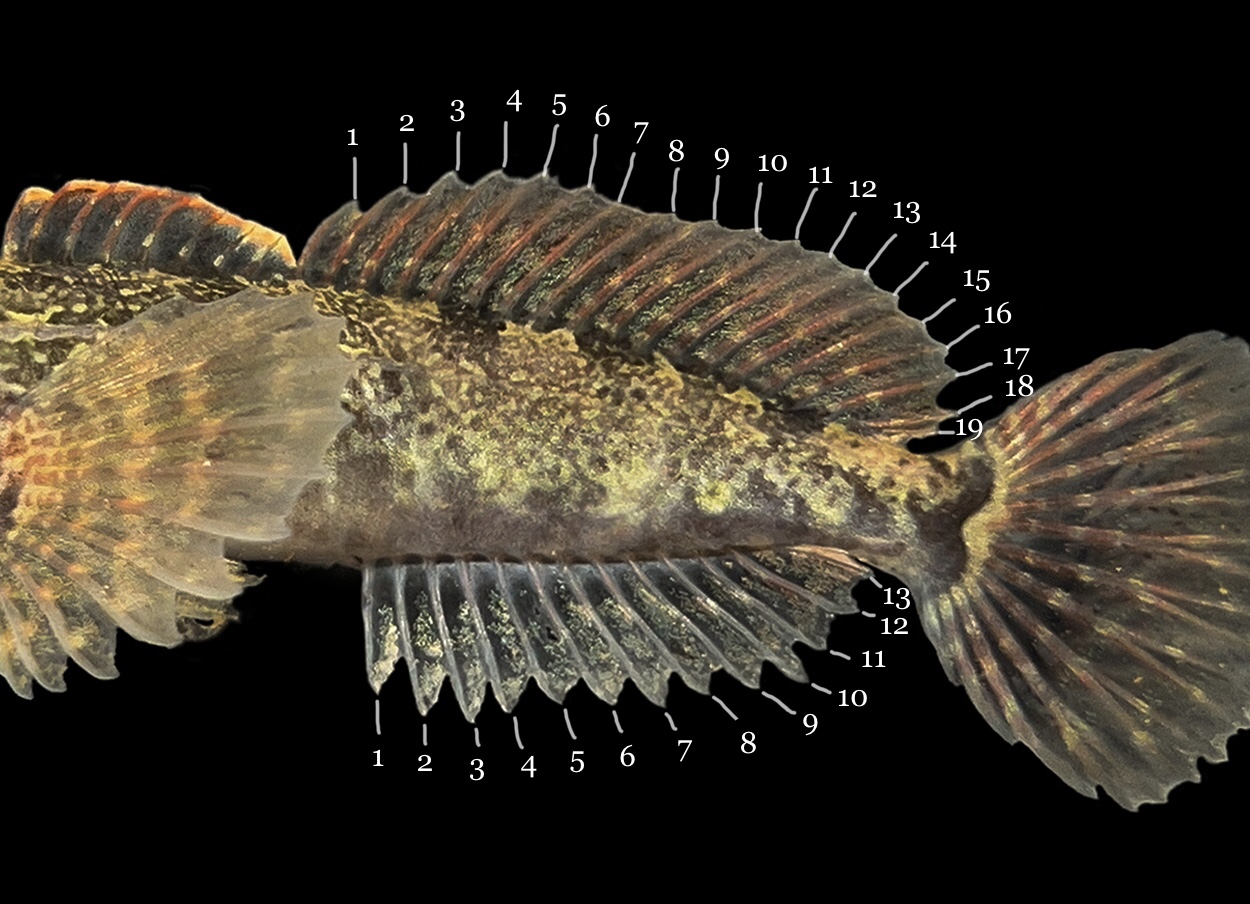
Ray fins on a Riffle sculpin

Coastal riffle sculpin adults are usually less than 80 mm (3.1 in) in length, have no scales, and have a dark brown camouflage color. C. Ohlone have 12-14 anal-fin rays, 6-9 dorsal spines, 15-19 dorsal fin rays, 0-2 chin pores, 1 pelvic fin spine with 3 rays, 14-16 pectoral fin rays, 2 preopercular spines, 1 lateral line (occasionally complete), and 25-35 lateral line pores. The dorsal fin (occasionally joined) has a black spot, and palatine teeth are most often present.

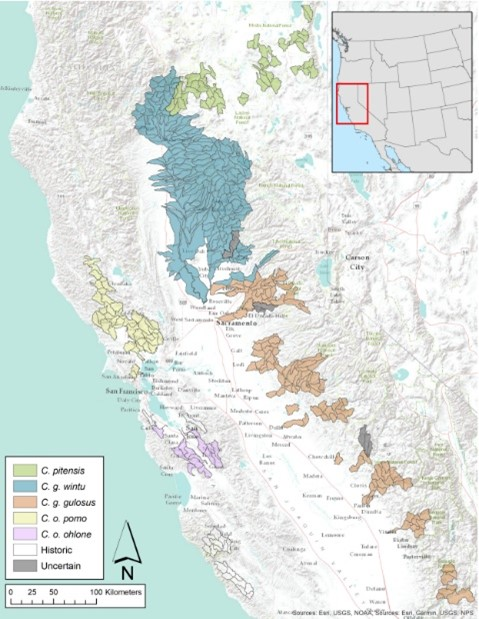
Habitat where Coastal Riffle Sculpin live

== Habitat ==
Coastal riffle sculpins are endemic to the San Francisco Bay and Santa Clara Valley. It has been located along the Coast Range Mountains in drainages flowing west or southwest, in watersheds such as the Russian River, Redwood Creek, Napa River, Sonoma Creek, and other watersheds that flow into the northern San Francisco Bay. Other places Coastal riffle sculpins have been located are streams draining the Diablo and Coastal ranges in the Santa Clara Valley and flowing south from the San Francisco Bay. It is believed to exist in the Salinas River but there have not been any records.

== Subspecies ==
Subspecies of Cottus ohlone are listed below as described by fisheries biologists Peter B. Moyle and Matthew A Campbell.

Geographical group	Common name	Scientific name	Range	Image
San Francisco, Santa Clara Valley	Ohlone riffle sculpin	Cottus ohlone ohlone	Restricted to highly developed streams in San Jose, Santa Clara Valley such as Guadalupe River, and upper Penitencia Creek. All known locations are west of the Diablo Range. The most south they have been located is Bird Creek and the northern most is Mateo Creek.	
San Francisco, Santa Clara Valley	Pomo riffle sculpin	Cottus ohlone pomo	Located in the upper parts of the Russian River, including the East fork, and in the northern San Francisco Bay such as the Napa River, Petaluma River, and Sonoma Creek.	

== Discovery ==
Baumsteiger J, Kinziger AP, and Aguliar A. provided a comprehensive review of the Cottus family in 2012 which described three

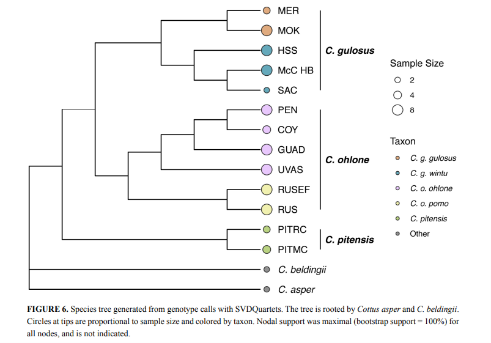
Genomic map of the cottus family

lineages informally and continued the study in 2014. From these studies, Moyle and Campbell in 2022 used phylogenetic and phenotypic data and labeled Cottus ohlone as its own unique species. In this study they used DNA sample collection, sequencing, and SNP generation (variation in DNA sequences when a nucleotide is changed in the genome). Of the initial 132 collected samples, 84 fish were analyzed through population genomics and molecular phylogenetic techniques. This led to the discovery of inland riffle sculpin (Cottus gulosus) and coastal riffle sculpin (Cottus ohlone) as sister lineages.

An additional study by Hana Moidu on the causes and consequences of stream drying led to the Cottus ohlone ohlone subspecies being spotted as a native rare species in Coyote Creek giving more legitimacy to the fish.

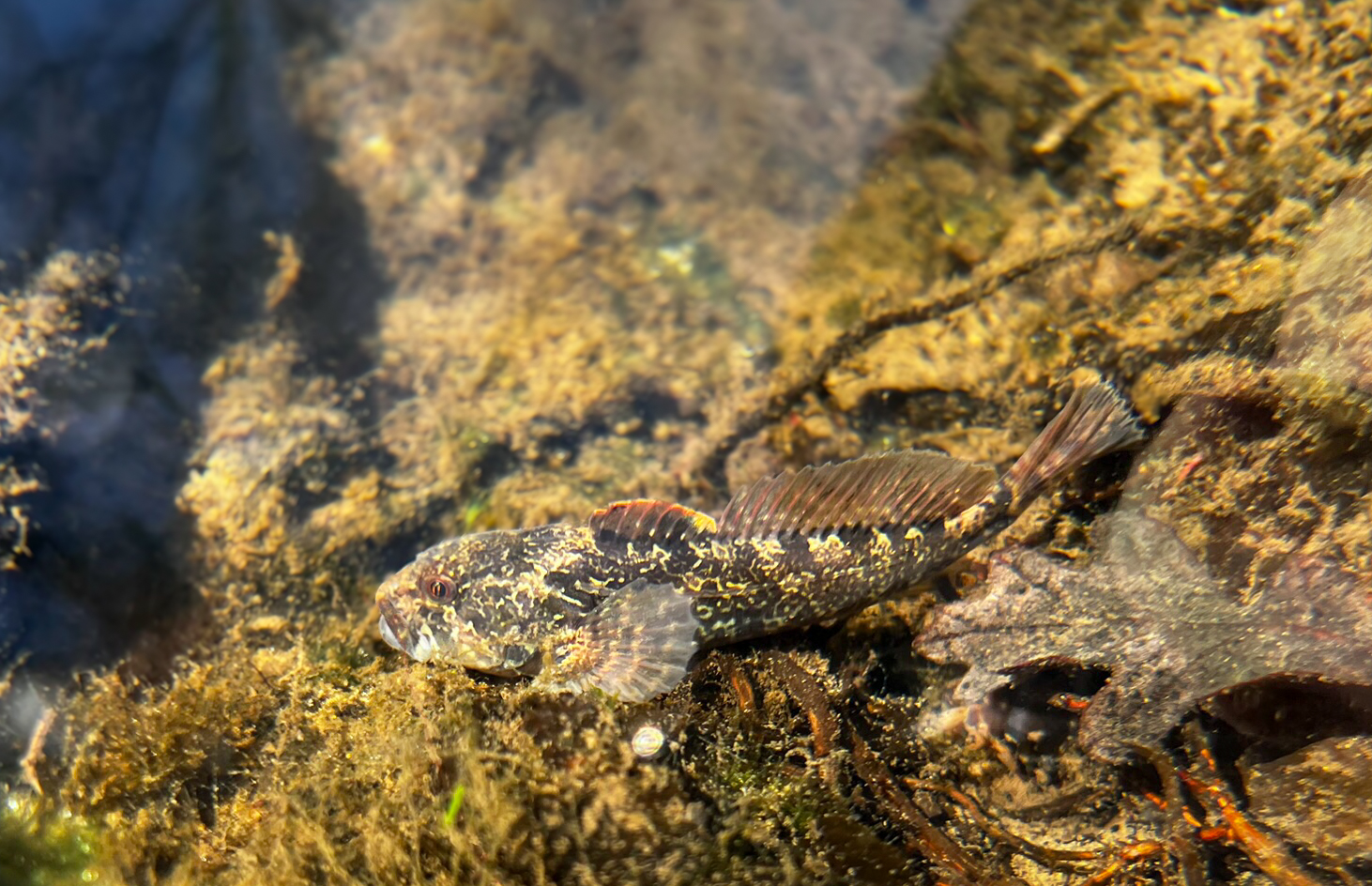
In a creek

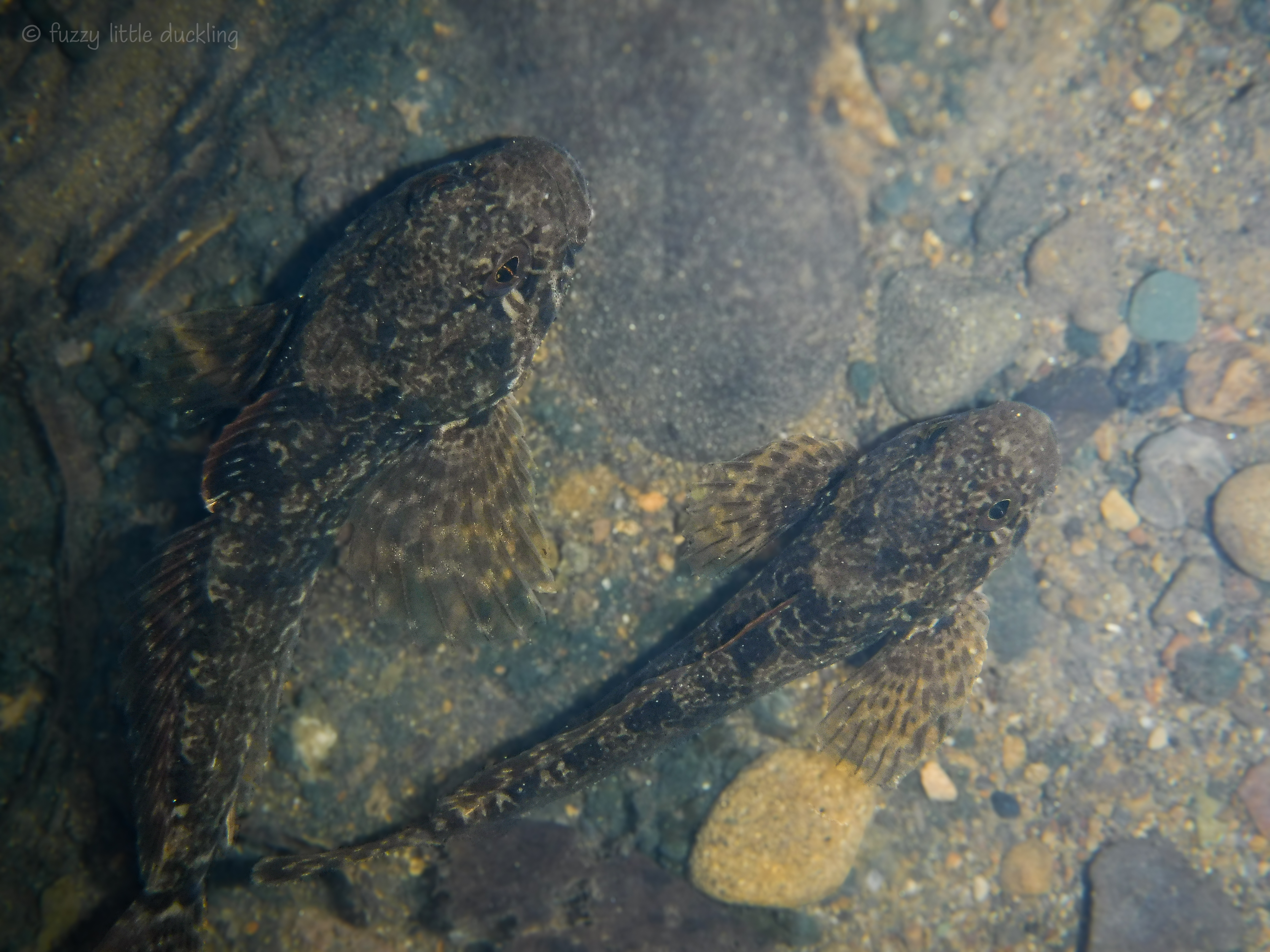

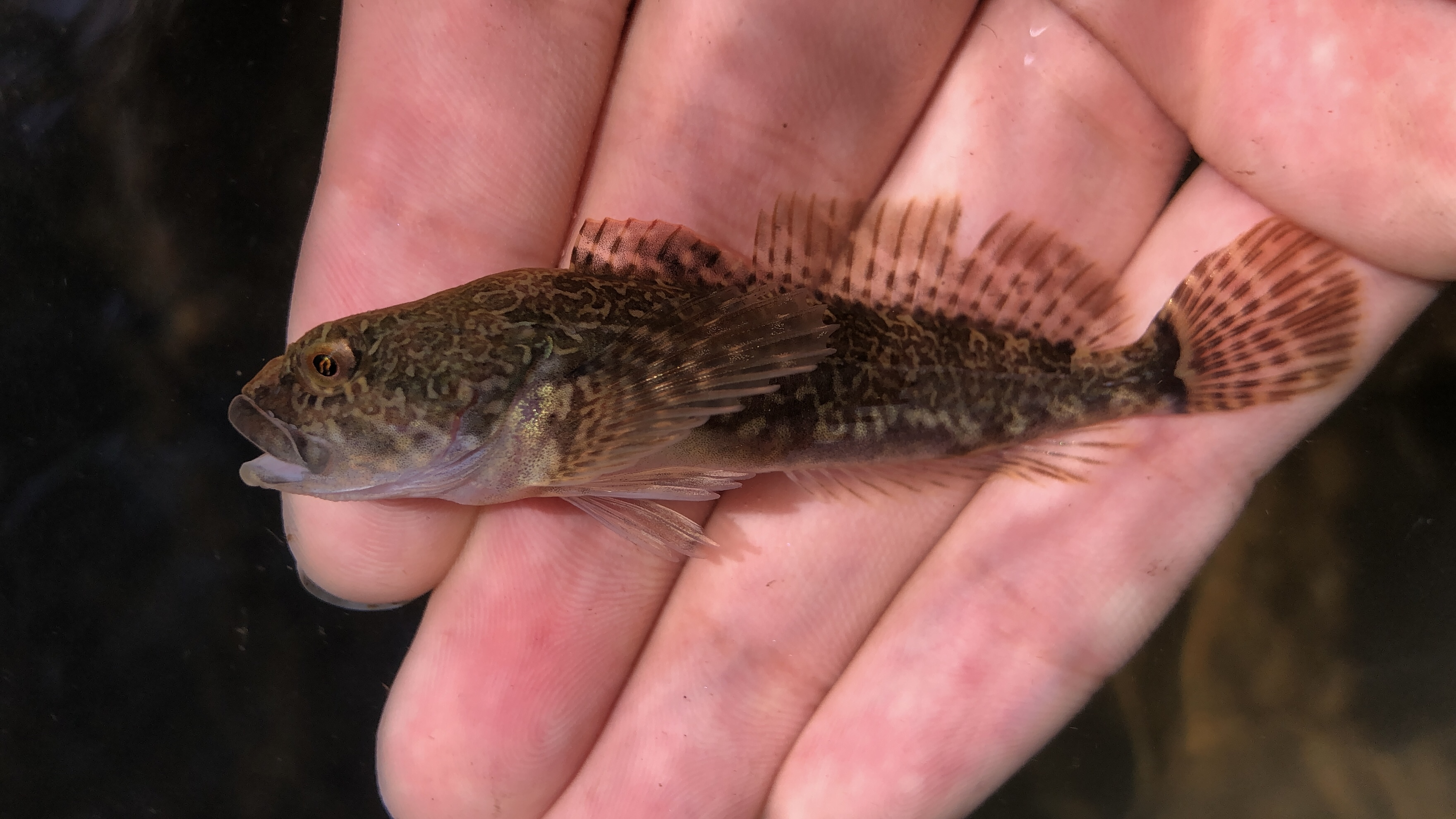

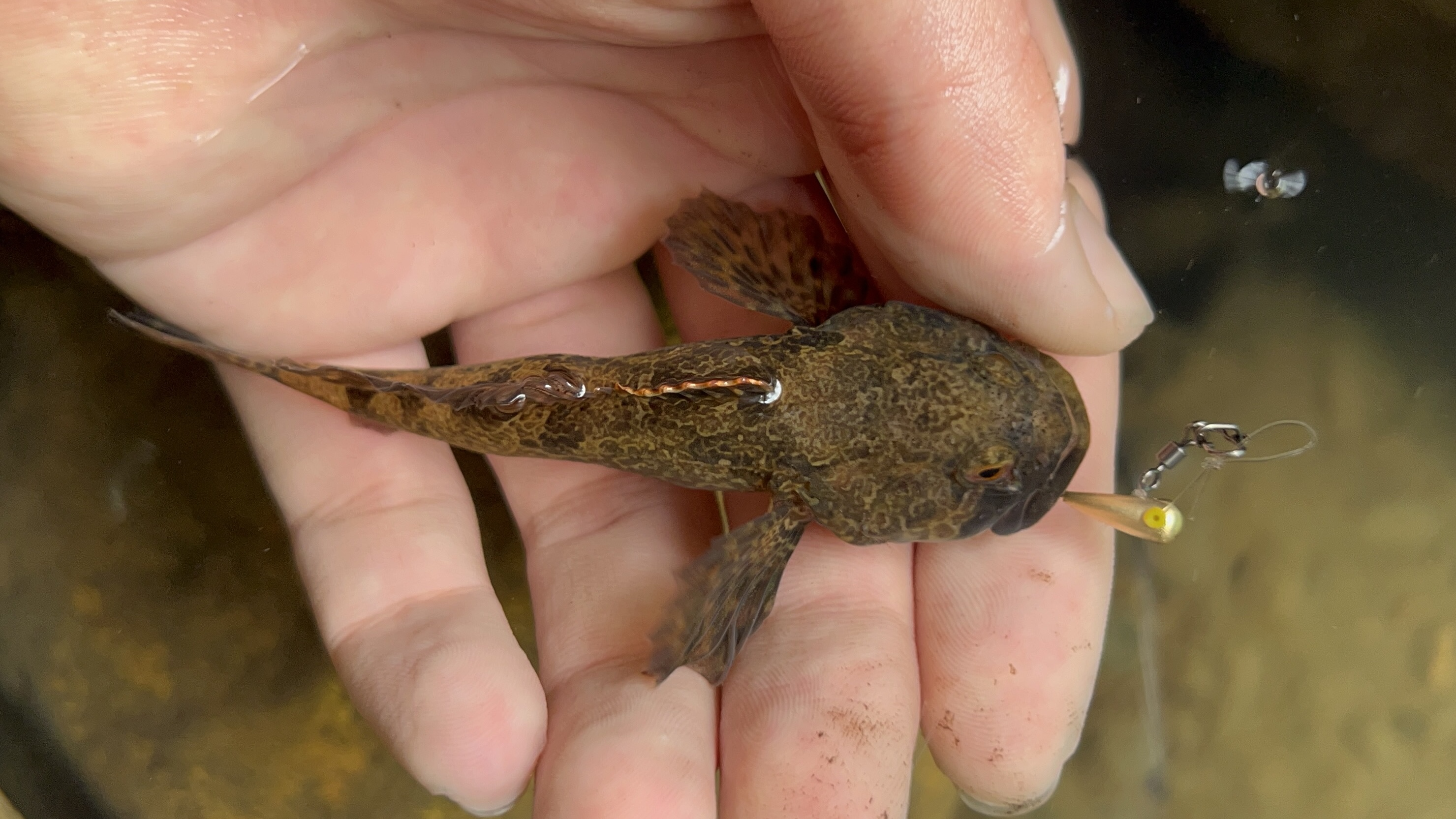
Large male Pomo riffle sculpin

== Diet ==
Since C. ohlone and C. gulosus were only recently differentiated as sister taxa, it is reasonable to presume that their diets are similar. C. gulosus are typically opportunistic feeders during the night, their main food sources are benthic invertebrates, fish, caddis flies, and mayflies. It is safe to presume C. ohlone feed from similar sources.

== Reproduction ==
It is reasonable to assume that the reproductive strategies of riffle sculpin are similar. Riffle sculpins can start reproducing after two years with 462-1000 eggs in early spring. The eggs are laid under rocks in which the male guards the nest. The average life span of a riffle sculpin is 4 years.
