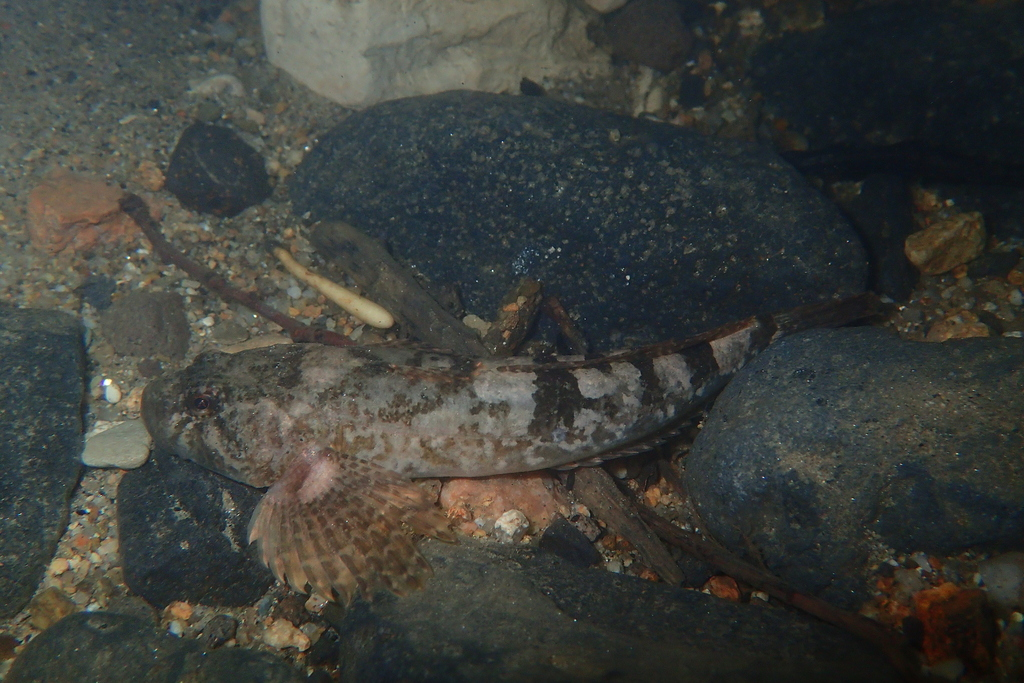

Conservation status
- Least Concern (IUCN 3.1)

Scientific classification
- Kingdom: Animalia
- Phylum: Chordata
- Class: Actinopterygii
- Order: Perciformes
- Suborder: Cottoidei
- Family: Cottidae
- Genus: Cottus
- Species: C. duranii

Binomial name
- Cottus duranii Freyhof, Kottelat and Nolte, 2005

= Cottus duranii =

Species of fish

Cottus duranii, the Dordogne sculpin or chabot d'Auvergne, is a species of freshwater ray-finned fish belonging to the family Cottidae, the typical sculpins. It is found in France. It inhabits the Loire and Dordogne river drainages. It reaches a maximum length of 10 cm (3.9 in). It prefers streams with clear, cool, moderate to swift water and stone substrate. This species was described as a separate species from the European bullhead (C. gobio) in 2005 by Jörg Freyhof, Maurice Kottelat and Arne W. Nolte. The specific name durani means "of Duranius", the Latin name of the River Dordogne.
