= Cottus hispaniolensis =

Conservation status
- Near Threatened (IUCN 3.1)

Scientific classification
- Kingdom: Animalia
- Phylum: Chordata
- Class: Actinopterygii
- Order: Perciformes
- Suborder: Cottoidei
- Family: Cottidae
- Genus: Cottus
- Species: C. hispaniolensis

Binomial name
- Cottus hispaniolensis Băcescu and Băcescu-Mester, 1964

Synonyms
- Cottus gobio hispaniolensis Băcesci & Băcescu-Mester, 1964

Species of fish

Cottus hispaniolensis is a species of freshwater ray-finned fish belonging to the family Cottidae, the typical sculpins. It is found in France and Spain. It inhabits the Garonne river drainage. It reaches a maximum length of 10.5 cm (4.1 in). It prefers streams with clear, cool, moderate to swift water and stone substrate. This taxon was originally described as a subspecies of the European bullhead (Cottus gobio), C. g. hispaniolensis, and was formally described as a separate species from the European bullhead in 2005 by Jörg Freyhof, Maurice Kottelat and Arne W. Nolte.
