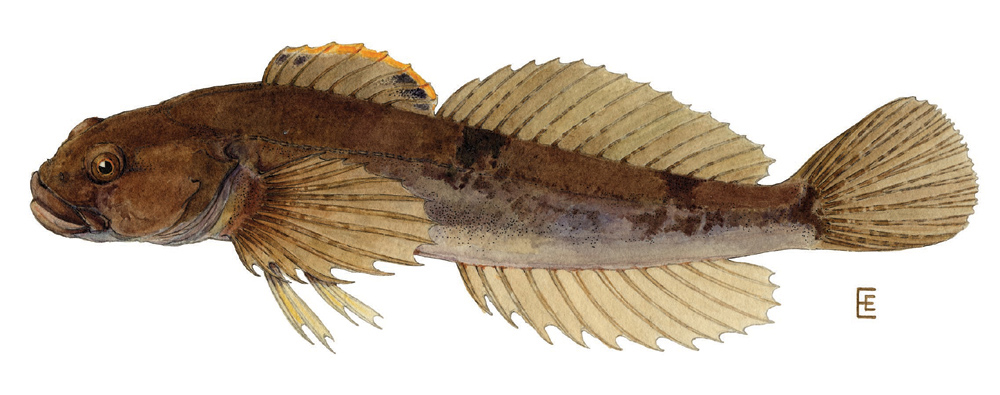
- Cottus cognatus

Scientific classification
- Kingdom: Animalia
- Phylum: Chordata
- Class: Actinopterygii
- Division: Teleostei
- Order: Perciformes
- Suborder: Cottoidei
- Family: Cottidae
- Genus: Cottus; Linnaeus, 1758

Type species
- Cottus gobio Linnaeus, 1758

Synonyms
- Uranoscopus Gronow, 1763; Pegedictis Rafinesque, 1820; Uranidea DeKay, 1842; Centridermichthys Richardson, 1845; Cottopsis Girard, 1850; Potamocottus Gill, 1861; Tauridea Jordan & Rice, 1878; Cephalocottus Gratzianov, 1907

= Cottus (fish) =

Cottus Temporal range: Late Miocene to present

Genus of fishes

Cottus is a genus of the mainly freshwater ray-finned fishes belonging to the family Cottidae, the typical sculpins. They are often referred to as the "freshwater sculpins", as they are the principal genus of sculpins to be found in fresh water. They are native to the Palearctic and Nearctic.

They are small fish, mostly less than 15 cm (6 in) in length, although a few species can reach twice that size.

== Taxonomy ==
Cottus was first proposed as a genus by Carl Linnaeus in the 10th edition of the Systema Naturae when he described the European bullhead (Cottus gobio) and in 1850 this species was designated as the type species of the genus by the French ichthyologist Charles Frédéric Girard. The 5th edition of the Fishes of the World classifies this genus within the subfamily Cottinae of the family Cottidae. Other authorities have found that the Cottidae, as delimited in the 5th edition of Fishes of the World, is paraphyletic and that the monophyletic grouping is the freshwater sculpins, including the Baikal sculpins, while most of the marine taxa are classified within the family Psychrolutidae. Cottus kazika has been found to be outside of a monophyletic Cottus and has been classified in the monospecific genus Rheopresbe.

The earliest fossil remains of the genus are of †Cottus calcatus from the latest Miocene or early Pliocene of Oregon, US. The species †Cottus cervicornis Storms, 1894 is known from the Early Oligocene of Belgium, but its taxonomic identity is uncertain.

== Species ==
There are currently around 70 recognized species in this genus:

- Subgenus Cottus Linnaeus, 1758
  - Cottus aturi Freyhof, Kottelat & Nolte, 2005
  - Cottus cyclophthalmus Sideleva, Kesminas & Zhidkov, 2022
  - Cottus duranii Freyhof, Kottelat & Norte, 2005 (Dordogne sculpin)
  - Cottus dzungaricus Kottelat, 2006
  - Cottus ferrugineus Heckel & Kner, 1857
  - Cottus gobio Linnaeus, 1758 (European bullhead)
  - Cottus gratzianowi Sideleva, Naseka & Zhidkov, 2015
  - Cottus haemusi Marinov & Dikov, 1986
  - Cottus hispaniolensis Băcescu & Băcescu-Mester, 1964
  - Cottus jaxartensis Berg, 1916
  - Cottus koshewnikowi Gratzianov, 1907
  - Cottus metae Freyhof, Kottelat & Nolte, 2005
  - Cottus microstomus Heckel, 1837
  - Cottus perifretum Freyhof, Kottelat & Nolte, 2005
  - Cottus petiti Băcescu & Băcescu-Mester, 1964
  - Cottus rhenanus Freyhof, Kottelat & Nolte, 2005
  - Cottus ricei E. W. Nelson, 1876 (Spoonhead sculpin)
  - Cottus rondeleti Freyhof, Kottelat & Nolte, 2005
  - Cottus sabaudicus Sideleva, 2009
  - Cottus scaturigo Freyhof, Kottelat & Nolte, 2005
  - Cottus sibiricus Kessler, 1889 (Siberian sculpin)
  - Cottus spinulosus Kessler, 1872 (Turkestan sculpin)
  - Cottus transsilvaniae Freyhof, Kottelat & Nolte, 2005
- Subgenus Cephalocottus Gratzianov, 1907
  - Cottus amblystomopsis P. Y. Schmidt, 1904 (Sakhalin sculpin)
  - Cottus nozawae Snyder, 1911
- Subgenus Cottopsis Girard, 1850
  - Cottus aleuticus C. H. Gilbert, 1896 (Coast Range sculpin)
  - Cottus asper J. Richardson, 1836 (Prickly sculpin)
  - Cottus asperrimus Rutter, 1908 (Rough sculpin)
  - Cottus gulosus Girard, 1854 (Inland riffle sculpin)
  - Cottus klamathensis C. H. Gilbert, 1898 (Marbled sculpin)
  - Cottus ohlone Moyle & Campbell, 2022 (Coastal riffle sculpin)
  - Cottus perplexus C. H. Gilbert & Evermann, 1894 (Reticulate sculpin)
  - Cottus pitensis R. M. Bailey & C. E. Bond, 1963 (Pit sculpin)
  - Cottus princeps C. H. Gilbert, 1898 (Klamath Lake sculpin)
  - Cottus tenuis Evermann & Meek, 1898 (Slender sculpin)
- Subgenus Uranidea DeKay, 1842
  - Cottus baileyi C. R. Robins, 1961 (Black sculpin)
  - Cottus bairdii Girard, 1850 (Mottled sculpin)
  - Cottus bendirei T. H. Bean, 1881 (Malheur sculpin)
  - Cottus caeruleomentum Kinziger, Raesly & Neely, 2000 (Blue Ridge sculpin)
  - Cottus carolinae T. N. Gill, 1861 (Banded sculpin)
  - Cottus chattahoochee Neely, J. D. Williams & Mayden, 2007 (Chattahoochee sculpin)
  - Cottus cognatus J. Richardson, 1836 (Slimy sculpin)
  - †Cottus echinatus R. M. Bailey & C. E. Bond, 1963 (Utah Lake sculpin)
  - Cottus extensus R. M. Bailey & C. E. Bond, 1963 (Bear Lake sculpin)
  - Cottus girardi C. R. Robins, 1961 (Potomac sculpin)
  - Cottus hubbsi R. M. Bailey & Dimick, 1949 (Columbia sculpin)
  - Cottus hypselurus C. R. Robins & H. W. Robison, 1985 (Ozark sculpin)
  - Cottus immaculatus Kinziger & R. M. Wood, 2010 (Knobfin sculpin)
  - Cottus kanawhae C. R. Robins, 2005 (Kanawha sculpin)
  - Cottus paulus J. D. Williams, 2000 (Pygmy sculpin)
  - Cottus rhotheus R. S. Eigenmann, 1882 (Torrent sculpin)
  - Cottus specus G. L. Adams & Burr, 2013 (Grotto sculpin)
  - Cottus tallapoosae Neely, J. D. Williams & Mayden, 2007 (Tallapoosa sculpin)
- Subgenus Incertae sedis
  - Cottus altaicus Kaschenko, 1899
  - Cottus beldingii C. H. Eigenmann & R. S. Eigenmann, 1891 (Paiute sculpin)
  - Cottus confusus R. M. Bailey & C. E. Bond, 1963 (Shorthead sculpin)
  - Cottus czerskii L. S. Berg, 1913 (Cherskii's sculpin)
  - Cottus dorofeevi Sideleva & Shidkov, 2024
  - Cottus greenei C. H. Gilbert & Culver, 1898 (Shoshone sculpin)
  - Cottus hangiongensis T. Mori, 1930
  - Cottus kolymensis Sideleva & A. Goto, 2012
  - Cottus koreanus R. Fujii, Y. Choi & Yabe, 2005
  - Cottus leiopomus C. H. Gilbert & Evermann, 1894 (Wood River sculpin)
  - Cottus marginatus T. H. Bean, 1881 (Margined sculpin)
  - Cottus nasalis L. S. Berg, 1933 (Tubenose sculpin)
  - Cottus perplexus C. H. Gilbert & Evermann, 1894 (Reticulate sculpin)
  - Cottus pollux Günther, 1873 (Japanese fluvial sculpin)
  - Cottus reinii Hilgendorf, 1879
  - Cottus schitsuumsh M. Lemoine, M. K. Young, McKelvey, L. Eby, Pilgrim & M. K. Schwartz, 2014 (Cedar sculpin)

The fossil species †Cottus calcatus Kimmel, 1975 is known from the late Miocene/early Pliocene-aged Deer Butte Formation of Oregon.

== Etymology ==
Cottus is derived from the Greek kottos, and is a latinisation that word, the original form of it being koviós or kóthos. This is likely to mean "head" and is the word for a small fish with a large head, and is now used for sculpins.
