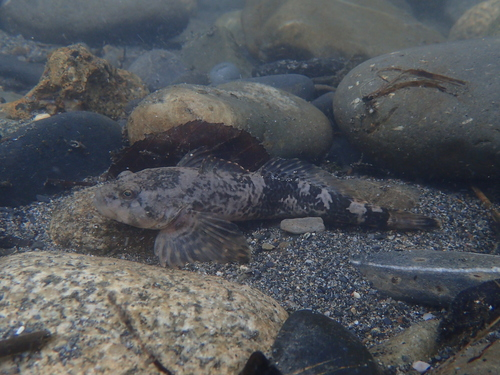

Conservation status
- Near Threatened (IUCN 3.1)

Scientific classification
- Kingdom: Animalia
- Phylum: Chordata
- Class: Actinopterygii
- Order: Perciformes
- Suborder: Cottoidei
- Family: Cottidae
- Genus: Cottus
- Species: C. aturi

Binomial name
- Cottus aturi Freyhof, Kottelat and Nolte, 2005

= Cottus aturi =

Species of fish

Cottus aturi, the Adour sculpin or Chabot du Béarn, is a species of freshwater ray-finned fish belonging to the family Cottidae, the typical sculpins. It is found in France and Spain. It inhabits the Adour and Nivelle river drainages. It reaches a maximum length of 10 cm (3.9 in). It prefers streams with clear, cool, moderate to swift water and stone substrate. This species was described as a separate species from the European bullhead (C. gobio) in 2005 by Jörg Freyhof, Maurice Kottelat and Arne W. Nolte.
