= Cottus dzungaricus =

Scientific classification
- Kingdom: Animalia
- Phylum: Chordata
- Class: Actinopterygii
- Order: Perciformes
- Suborder: Cottoidei
- Family: Cottidae
- Genus: Cottus
- Species: C. dzungaricus

Binomial name
- Cottus dzungaricus Kottelat, 2006

Synonyms
- Cottus sibiricus altaicus Li & Ho, 1966

Species of fish

Cottus dzungaricus is a species of freshwater ray-finned fish belonging to the family Cottidae, the typical sculpins. It is endemic to China. It reaches a maximum length of 10.0 cm. This species was first formally described in 2006 by the Belgian ichthyologist Maurice Kottelat a replacement name for Li & Ho's Cottus sibiricus altaicus of 1966, a name preoccupied by Cottus poecilopus altaicus which had been named by Nicholas Feofanovich Kaschenko in 1899. The type locality is Altai, northern Sinkiang in China. This species is distinguished from Cottus sibiricus by having a naked body whereas C. sibiricus is covered in prickles. The specific name dzungarius, means belonging to Dzungaria, northern Xinjiang where the species is found.
