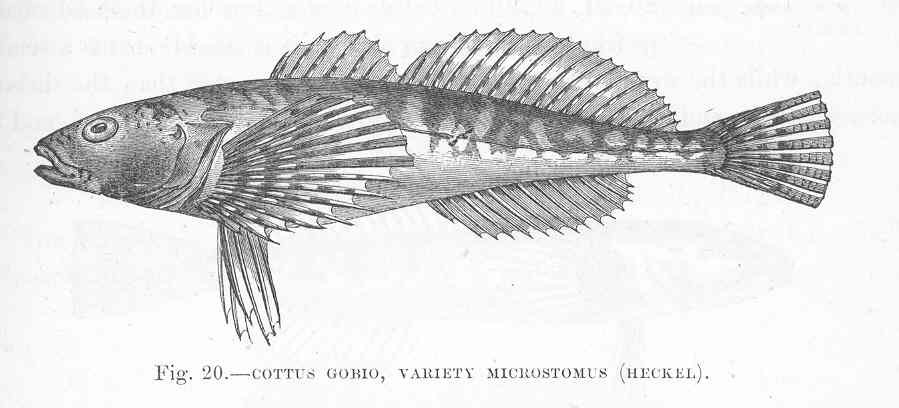

Conservation status
- Least Concern (IUCN 3.1)

Scientific classification
- Kingdom: Animalia
- Phylum: Chordata
- Class: Actinopterygii
- Division: Teleostei
- Order: Perciformes
- Suborder: Cottoidei
- Family: Cottidae
- Genus: Cottus
- Species: C. microstomus

Binomial name
- Cottus microstomus Heckel, 1837

= Cottus microstomus =

Species of fish

Cottus microstomus, or the Baltic Sculpin is a species of freshwater ray-finned fish belonging to the family Cottidae, the typical sculpins. It is found in Eastern Europe and is widespread in the Dniester drainage (Black Sea basin), Odra and Vistula drainages (southern Baltic basin), most likely extending further east to the Gulf of Finland. It is part of the wider European Cottus gobio complex, and possibly makes hybrid zones with Cottus gobio (European bullhead) and Cottus koshewnikowi. It is a demersal fish, up to 10.1 cm (4.0 in) long.
