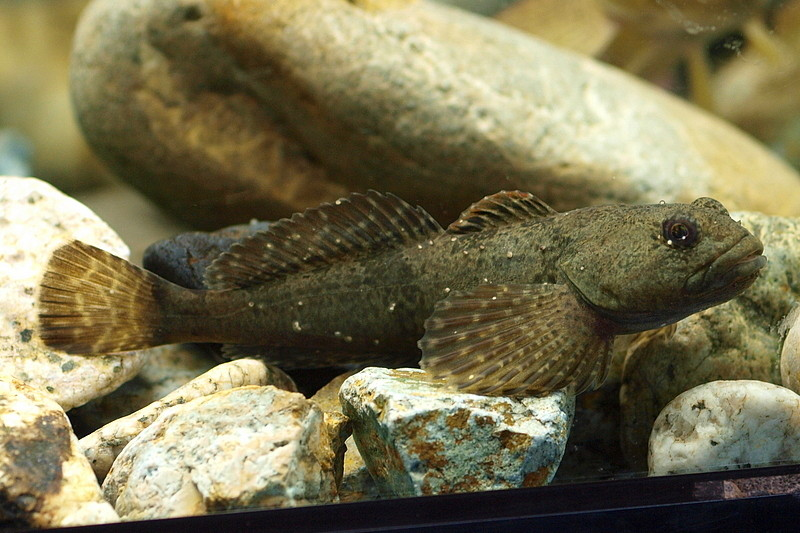

Conservation status
- Least Concern (IUCN 3.1)

Scientific classification
- Kingdom: Animalia
- Phylum: Chordata
- Class: Actinopterygii
- Order: Perciformes
- Suborder: Cottoidei
- Family: Cottidae
- Genus: Cottus
- Species: C. nozawae

Binomial name
- Cottus nozawae Snyder, 1911

= Cottus nozawae =

Species of fish

Cottus nozawae is a species of freshwater ray-finned fish belonging to the family Cottidae, the typical sculpins. It is found in southern Sakhalin Island in Russia, Hokkaido and northern Honshu in Japan and in the Korean Peninsula. It reaches a maximum length of 6.9 cm. This species was first formally described in 1911 by the American ichthyologist John Otterbein Snyder with its type locality given as the Ishikari River at Sapporo on Hokkaido. This species is sometimes placed in the subgenus Cephalocottus. The specific name honours zoologist Shunjiro Nozawa, Director of the Fisheries Bureau on Hokkaido.
