= Cottus kolymensis =

Conservation status
- Least Concern (IUCN 3.1)

Scientific classification
- Kingdom: Animalia
- Phylum: Chordata
- Class: Actinopterygii
- Order: Perciformes
- Suborder: Cottoidei
- Family: Cottidae
- Genus: Cottus
- Species: C. kolymensis

Binomial name
- Cottus kolymensis Sideleva and A. Goto, 2012

Species of fish

Cottus kolymensis is a species of freshwater ray-finned fish belonging to the family Cottidae, the typical sculpins. It is endemic to Russia. It inhabits the Kolyma, Magadan, and Dukcha rivers. It reaches a maximum length of 9.9 cm.
