= Tubenose sculpin =

Conservation status
- Least Concern (IUCN 3.1)

Scientific classification
- Kingdom: Animalia
- Phylum: Chordata
- Class: Actinopterygii
- Order: Perciformes
- Suborder: Cottoidei
- Family: Cottidae
- Genus: Cottus
- Species: C. nasalis

Binomial name
- Cottus nasalis L. S. Berg, 1933

Species of fish

The tubenose sculpin (Cottus nasalis) is a species of freshwater ray-finned fish belonging to the family Cottidae, the typical sculpins. It inhabits the upper Syr-Darya basin in Kyrgyzstan and Uzbekistan. It reaches a maximum length of 6.9 cm.
