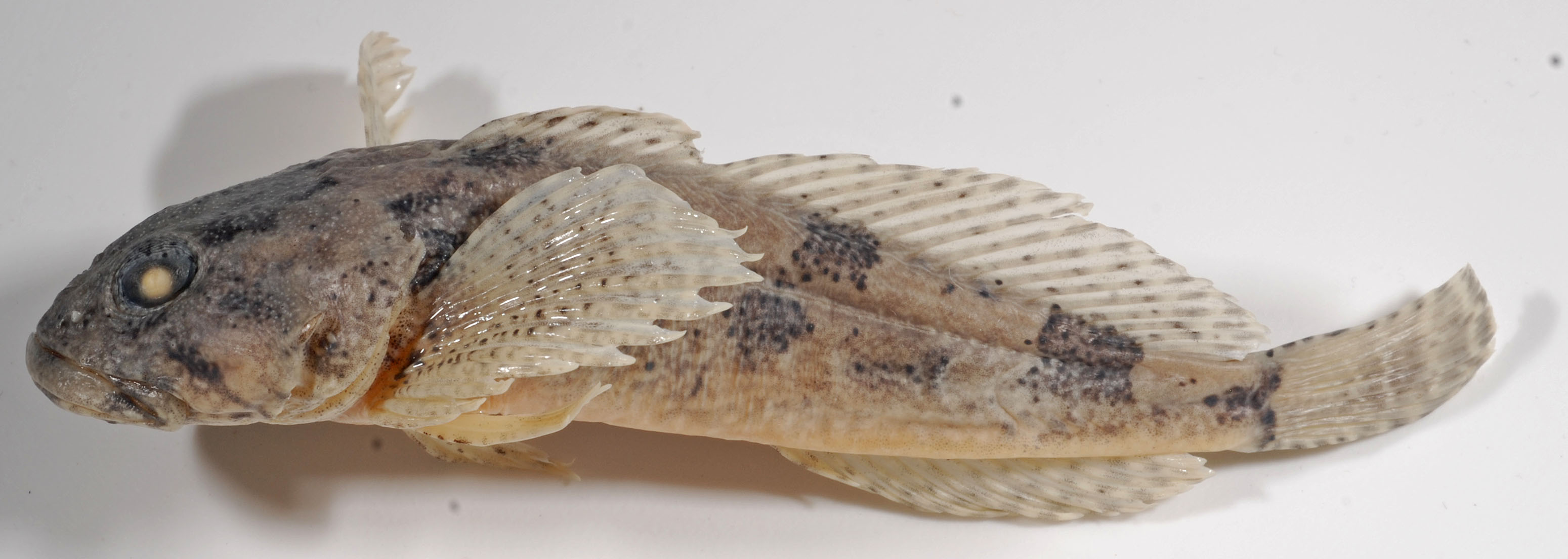

Conservation status
- Least Concern (IUCN 3.1)

Scientific classification
- Kingdom: Animalia
- Phylum: Chordata
- Class: Actinopterygii
- Order: Perciformes
- Suborder: Cottoidei
- Family: Cottidae
- Genus: Cottus
- Species: C. girardi

Binomial name
- Cottus girardi Robins, 1961

= Potomac sculpin =

Species of fish

The Potomac sculpin (Cottus girardi) is a freshwater species of sculpin that lives in West Virginia, Maryland, Virginia and Pennsylvania.

== Description ==
The Potomac sculpin has a large head and mouth, with the eyes located on the upper part of the head. It has fan-like pectoral fins, and connected dorsal fins. It has twenty-six or fewer lateral-lines pores. In addition, it has four pelvic fins and fifteen pectoral fins. It has spots of coloration on its chin. The sculpin has an average length of 7.8 centimeters (3.1 in) and has been recorded with a length of up to 14 centimeters (5.5 in).

== Habitat ==
It lives in James River drainage area in Virginia, as well as the Potomac River drainage system in Virginia, West Virginia, Maryland and Pennsylvania. The sculpin lives in small to medium-sized streams, and is relatively tolerant of warm water temperatures. The stream conditioned favored by this species varies depending on sex. Male sculpins tend to live in silt or in aquatic plant growth. Female sculpins tend to live in streams with faster currents. C. girardi juveniles tend to live in streams with minimal current.

== Behavior ==
The sculpin is a carnivore. It consumes copepods, mayflies nymphs and chironomids. Cottus girardi also occasionally consumes other species of fish.

The fish reproduces through spawning. They are believed to spawn in early spring or late winter.

== Conservation status ==
This sculpin is considered to be of least concern by the International Union for Conservation of Nature because it has a large natural range, a large population and a number of subpopulations, and a relatively stable population trend over time. In addition, there are no major threats to the survival of the sculpin.
