= Ozark sculpin =

Conservation status
- Least Concern (IUCN 3.1)

Scientific classification
- Kingdom: Animalia
- Phylum: Chordata
- Class: Actinopterygii
- Order: Perciformes
- Suborder: Cottoidei
- Family: Cottidae
- Genus: Cottus
- Species: C. hypselurus

Binomial name
- Cottus hypselurus Robins and H. W. Robison, 1985

Species of fish

The Ozark sculpin (Cottus hypselurus) is a species of ray-finned fish belonging to the family Cottidae, the typical sculpins. It is endemic to Missouri, United States, inhabiting the Osage, Gasconade, and Black river drainages. It reaches a maximum length of 14.0 cm. It prefers rocky riffles of headwaters and creeks.

== Taxonomy ==
The Ozark sculpin was first formally described in 1985 by C. Richard Robins and Henry W. Robison with the type locality given as the Bennett Springs, 11 miles northwest of Lebanon, Missouri. This species is classified by some authorities in the subgenus Uranidea.
