= Pit sculpin =

Conservation status
- Least Concern (IUCN 3.1)

Scientific classification
- Kingdom: Animalia
- Phylum: Chordata
- Class: Actinopterygii
- Order: Perciformes
- Suborder: Cottoidei
- Family: Cottidae
- Genus: Cottus
- Species: C. pitensis

Binomial name
- Cottus pitensis R. M. Bailey & C. E. Bond, 1963

Species of fish

The Pit sculpin (Cottus pitensis) is an endemic species of freshwater ray-finned fish belonging to the family Cottidae, the typical sculpins. It is found in the United States, inhabiting the Pit and upper Sacramento river systems in Oregon and California. It reaches a maximum length of 13.0 cm. It prefers rubble and gravel riffles.

== Identification ==
Pit sculpins have a darkly mottled body coloration with a light underside. As is typical for sculpins, they have large and flat heads. Generally, they have two pre-opercular spines, prickles on either side of their pectoral fins, and a larger patch of dark coloration on their anterior dorsal fin. The Pit sculpin was first described as a separate species in 1963, though it is very similar to the inland riffle sculpin (which was described in 1854). Genomic research confirmed that Pit sculpins are genetically distinct from Inland Riffle sculpins, proving it deserves recognition as its own species.

== Ecology ==
Pit sculpins reside in shallow areas of rivers that have high velocity flows and coarse sediment. With a preference for high oxygen levels and water temperatures of 25 °C or below, they have a broad temperature tolerance, with relatively high tolerance for warmer temperatures in comparison to other sculpin species. They are considered to be a eurythermal fish species.

Feeding primarily in earlier times of day, their diet consists mainly of aquatic insects. Pit sculpins are also known to be potentially aggressive, at times excluding other fish species from the riffles they inhabit. They feed selectively on the larvae of aquatic insects, including stonefly nymphs and certain mayfly larvae, while largely avoiding aquatic macroinvertebrates with hard shells.

Fish species that Pit sculpins share these stream habitats with include Sacramento sucker, rainbow trout, and speckled dace. To this day, Pit sculpins are common in the Pit River and are considered a sensitive species in Oregon because of their limited distribution.

== Life history ==
Pit sculpins mature in their second year, with a typical life span of 5 years and relatively low fecundity. Females have about 61 to 320 eggs per breeding season. Spawning season ranges from February to March annually. Male Pit sculpins attract female mates by building rock caves, who will select a cave to lay their eggs in. Males then return to fertilize the eggs. After hatching, the larval spawn stay close to the rock cave for their early life.

At the start of the spawning period, male Pit sculpin individuals undergo both physical and behavioral changes; their coloration darkens, they develop an orange mark on both dorsal fins, and they defend their nesting caves against other males.

Pit sculpins are most abundant in the lower order streams such as Rush and Ash Creeks of the Pit River watershed, preferring cool, oxygenated water to the warmer conditions found in the lower Pit River basin. While genomic and phylogeographic differences have been observed between the Pit sculpin and its sister taxa, behavioral and life history differences across species are less understood. They feed primarily on aquatic invertebrates, and have demonstrated a high degree of prey selectivity in stomach content analyses.

== Geographic distribution ==
Morphology-based misidentification with cryptic species in historical literature led to a long-standing overestimation of the Pit sculpin's range; however, recent molecular and phylogeographic studies have refined its distribution to the Pit River watershed, a tributary of the upper Sacramento River. Earlier accounts had attributed specimens from across the Sacramento drainage and adjacent basins to Cottus pitensis, largely due to overlapping meristic traits and subtle morphological differences among western Cottus species. Advances in genetic analyses, particularly the use of mitochondrial DNA and multilocus sequencing, have since clarified that many of these populations belong instead to closely related taxa such as the riffle sculpin (C. gulosus) and prickly sculpin (C. asper). The Pit sculpin's historical range is believed to have extended into the lower Sacramento Basin, but this distribution was truncated following the construction of Shasta Dam in the 1940s, which formed an impassable barrier between the Pit River and downstream habitats. In addition to restricting gene flow, impoundment altered temperature regimes, sediment transport, and flow variability, further reducing suitable habitat for the species below the dam. Today, C. pitensis is recognized as endemic to the Pit River watershed; a characteristic it shares with the less abundant rough sculpin, Cottus asperrimus. Hybridization with sister taxa (C. gulosus and C. asper) is thought to have occurred prior to the species’ confinement above Shasta Dam; however, the frequency, ecological context, and persistence of hybrid lineages remain poorly understood, and it is uncertain whether hybrid-derived populations continue to exist within the lower Sacramento Basin.

== Taxonomy ==
A Perciformes species of the family Cottidae, the Pit sculpin was first described by Bailey and Bond in 1963. Recent molecular investigations have determined the species part of the C. asper (prickly sculpin) species complex, with significant divergence its sister taxa C. gulosis, C. asper and C. perplexus.

== Conservation status and efforts ==
The Pit sculpin (C. pitensis) is currently assessed as a species of Least Concern, though its restricted range within the Pit River watershed makes it inherently vulnerable to local disturbances. The species is locally common in cold, well-oxygenated headwater streams, but these habitats are increasingly affected by human activities. Major threats include habitat degradation from sedimentation and channel alteration, reduced flows caused by water diversion and drought, warming stream temperatures linked to climate change, and fragmentation of populations by dams and culverts. The mainstem of the Pit River itself, from which C. pitensis derives its name, is listed as impaired for several key water quality parameters, including temperature, dissolved oxygen and nutrients under Section 303d of the federal Clean Water Act.

Like related riffle, rough and marbled sculpins, the Pit sculpin depends on coarse substrates and cool, flowing water, conditions that can rapidly decline with land-use change and altered hydrology. Its limited dispersal ability and tendency to occupy isolated tributaries further heighten vulnerability to localized impacts such as drought, pollution, or development. Although comprehensive population monitoring is lacking, conservation biologists emphasize the importance of maintaining riparian cover, restoring natural flow regimes, and preserving connectivity among tributaries. Monitoring of temperature, flow, and contaminants has been recommended to detect emerging stressors, while genetic and eDNA surveys could help identify distinct or at-risk populations. Continued research and proactive habitat protection are considered essential to ensure that the Pit sculpin remains secure under future environmental change.

== Cultural significance ==
Although the Pit Sculpin is not traditionally viewed as a culturally significant species, its ecological importance within the Pit River contributes to the river's wider cultural value for contemporary society and the history of local indigenous peoples. Historically, the river supported abundant runs of Chinook salmon, steelhead, and other anadromous fishes that migrated far upstream prior to the construction of hydropower dams in the early 20th century. These species formed a key subsistence resource for the Pit River Tribe (Ajumawi and Atsugewi) and contributed to a diverse native fish assemblage. Although anadromous migrants can no longer access the upper watershed, the modern fishery is renowned for its wild rainbow trout (Oncorhynchus mykiss) population and is considered one of California's premier destinations for technical fly fishing. The river's aquatic food web continues to be shaped in part by native benthic fishes such as the Pit Sculpin. These fishes formed an important prey base for both juvenile and adult anadromous species prior to access being blocked, and today they help sustain the high growth rates of the native trout populations for which the Pit River is known. Today, recreational angling contributes substantially to the economies of small communities throughout the Fall River Valley and Pit River drainage.
