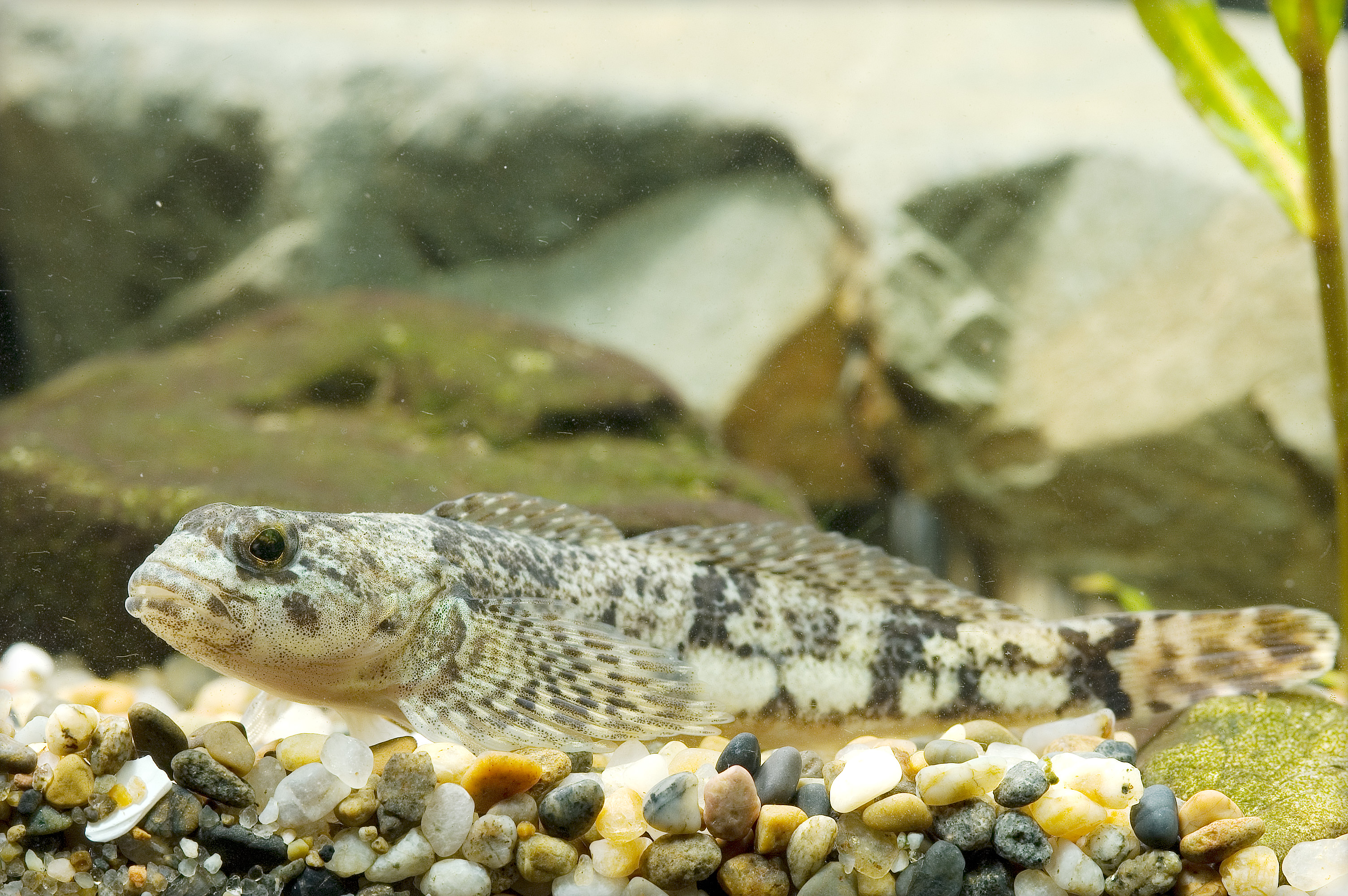

Conservation status
- Least Concern (IUCN 3.1)

Scientific classification
- Kingdom: Animalia
- Phylum: Chordata
- Class: Actinopterygii
- Order: Perciformes
- Suborder: Cottoidei
- Family: Cottidae
- Genus: Cottus
- Species: C. reinii

Binomial name
- Cottus reinii Hilgendorf, 1879

= Cottus reinii =

Species of fish

Cottus reinii is a species of freshwater ray-finned fish belonging to the family Cottidae, the typical sculpins. It is endemic to Japan, occurring from Aomori to Wakayama prefectures in eastern Honshu and Tokushima and Kochi prefectures on Shikoku. It reaches a maximum length of 12.0 cm (4.7 in).
