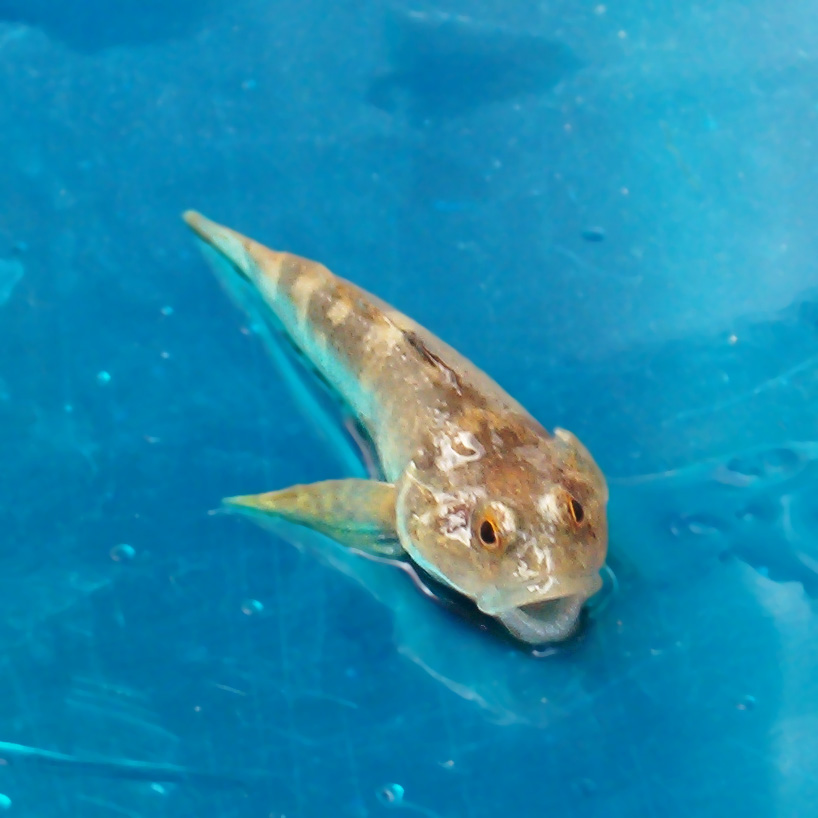

Conservation status
- Critically Endangered (IUCN 3.1)

Scientific classification
- Kingdom: Animalia
- Phylum: Chordata
- Class: Actinopterygii
- Order: Perciformes
- Suborder: Cottoidei
- Family: Cottidae
- Genus: Cottus
- Species: C. petiti

Binomial name
- Cottus petiti Băcescu & Băcescu-Mester, 1964

= Cottus petiti =

Species of fish

Cottus petiti, also called the chabot du Lez in French, is a species of freshwater ray-finned fish belonging to the family Cottidae, the typical sculpins. It is endemic to France, found only in a small 3 km stretch of the river Lez in Southern France near Montpellier. The natural habitat is fed by karstic springs which may have enabled the isolated survival of the population through geological history. Now the species may be threatened by habitat loss. The males of this species are typically 56 mm (2.2 in) in length. This species was confirmed as a separate species from the European bullhead (C. gobio) in 2005 by Jörg Freyhof, Maurice Kottelat and Arne W. Nolte.

== Etymology ==
The specific name honours the zoologist and anatomist Georges Petit (zoologie) of the Muséum national d'Histoire naturelle.

It is part of the Cottus gobio complex, and genetically very close to C. gobio.
