= Cottus gratzianowi =

Scientific classification
- Kingdom: Animalia
- Phylum: Chordata
- Class: Actinopterygii
- Order: Perciformes
- Suborder: Cottoidei
- Family: Cottidae
- Genus: Cottus
- Species: C. gratzianowi

Binomial name
- Cottus gratzianowi Sideleva, Naseka & Zhidkov, 2015

Species of fish

Cottus gratzianowi is a species of freshwater ray-finned fish belonging to the family Cottidae, the typical sculpins. It is endemic to Russia. It inhabits the Ukhtomitsa River in the Onega River drainage.
