= Columbia sculpin =

Conservation status
- Least Concern (IUCN 3.1)

Scientific classification
- Kingdom: Animalia
- Phylum: Chordata
- Class: Actinopterygii
- Order: Perciformes
- Suborder: Cottoidei
- Family: Cottidae
- Genus: Cottus
- Species: C. hubbsi

Binomial name
- Cottus hubbsi R. M. Bailey and Dimick, 1949

Species of fish

The Columbia sculpin (Cottus hubbsi) is a species of fish in the family Cottidae. It is found in the United States and Canada, inhabiting the Columbia River drainage and Harney Basin in Oregon, British Columbia, Idaho, Washington, and Nevada. It reaches a maximum length of 11.2 centimetres (4.4 inches). It prefers rocky riffles of headwaters and creeks.

== Taxonomy ==
The Columbia sculpin was first formally described in 1949 by Reeve Maclaren Bailey and Mary Fitzgibbon Dimick with the type locality given as the Entiat River in Chelan County, Washington. This species is classified by some authorities in the subgenus Uranidea. The specific name honors the American ichthyologist Carl Leavitt Hubbs who first recognized this taxon as new.
