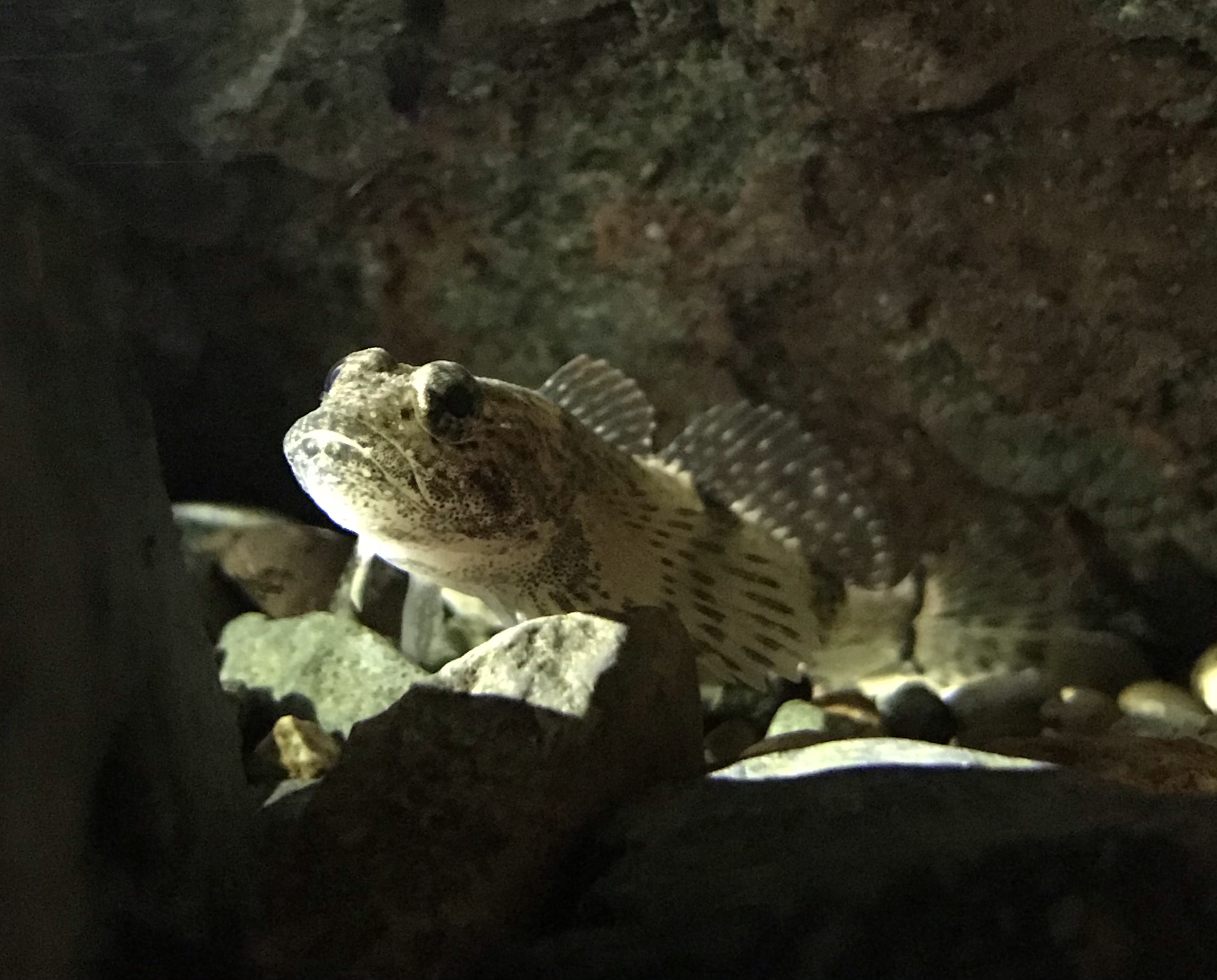

Conservation status
- Least Concern (IUCN 3.1)

Scientific classification
- Kingdom: Animalia
- Phylum: Chordata
- Class: Actinopterygii
- Division: Teleostei
- Order: Perciformes
- Suborder: Cottoidei
- Family: Cottidae
- Genus: Cottus
- Species: C. rhotheus

Binomial name
- Cottus rhotheus R. S. Eigenmann, 1882

= Torrent sculpin =

Species of fish

The torrent sculpin (Cottus rhotheus) is a species of ray-finned fish belonging to the family Cottidae, the typical sculpins. It is found in the United States and Canada, inhabiting upper Fraser River drainage in British Columbia to the Nehalem River in Oregon (including the Columbia River drainage of British Columbia, Washington, Idaho, Montana and Oregon. It reaches a maximum length of 150 mm. It prefers swift waters of small to large rivers with stable gravel or rubble bottoms, and rocky lake shores.

== Species description ==
The torrent sculpin (Cottus rhotheus) is a grey, brown color with black speckling. There is a soft orange color present on the ventral side of the body located between the pectoral fins. The ventral side of their body is speckled. There are bands formed near the dorsal fin, caudal fin, and anal fin. There may be a vague band near the pectoral fins formed of the speckles. The dorsal fin is orange on a male. The base of the dorsal fin may be darker in color. C. rhotheus has two sharp dorsal fins. They have a heavily mottled chin, with two pores located on the top of it. They have a subterminal mouth. Three sharp spines are present on their preoperculum. Very rigid and strong prickles are located on the head, near the dorsal fins, the dorsal side of the caudal peduncle, and surrounding the anal fin. This feature may be reduced in some C. rhotheus fish.

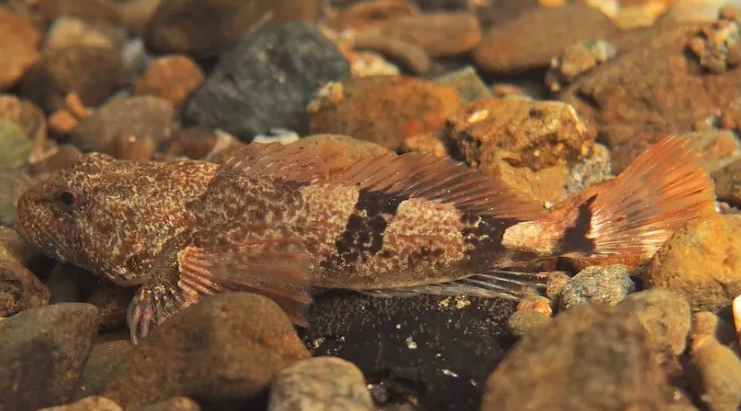
Torrent Sculpin

On average, C. rhotheus can range from 50 mm to 150 mm in length. In an adult life stage, torrent sculpins were measured to be greater than 45 mm in length. In a juvenile life stage, they were greater than 35–45 mm in length. They have a relatively large gape, width of mouth being 5.7 mm and 42 mm in length on a larger adult torrent sculpin. C. rhotheus have narrow bands of teeth on the upper and lower jaw; strong palatine teeth and vomerine teeth are present. The species exhibits geographic variation in terms of head length, length of lateral line, presence of prickles, and caudal vertebrae size. There was an increase in the caudal vertebrae size when examined in British Columbia, and a smaller size in Oregon. The C. rhotheus located in Washington and Oregon are found to have absent or significantly reduced prickles, shorter heads, and shorter lateral lines than the torrent sculpins found in British Columbia. There are no noticeable differences in dorsal spines, dorsal rays, anal rays, or caudal vertebrae when comparing between sex. Mature females can be identified based on their extended abdomens.

== Systematics ==
The torrent sculpin species is within class Actinopterygii, the ray-finned fishes. It lies within the superorder Acanthopterygii, order Perciformes, and suborder Cottoidei. It belongs to the family Cottidae, with around 300 total species within the family located across the globe. The genus and species name is Cottus rhotheus. The torrent sculpin may be confused with other freshwater sculpin species, such as the prickly sculpin and shorthead sculpin. The torrent sculpin can be identified separately from these overlapping species due to its heavily mottled chin, broader and longer head, complete lateral line, and strong prickles.

== Distribution ==
C. rhotheus is a widespread species that is a bottom-dwelling fish, persisting in high numbers. They are commonly found within the Columbia River Basin. This consists of British Columbia, Washington, Idaho, Montana, and Oregon regions. It also lives in the upper Fraser River system in British Colombia, the coastal drainage systems in Nehalem River within Oregon, and the coastal drainage systems in Pudget Sound within Washington.

C. rhotheus has a wide range of habitats that mostly consist of lotic water systems. They are present within medium to large streams and can be found in lakes further north. Their distribution is patchy within the Lake Washington basin. There are four other sculpin species which inhabit the Lake Washington basin with higher numbers, including 25 native species and 20 introduced species. Introduced, or non-native species, can cause increased competition and predation on sculpins, weakening their population numbers. Within the Cedar River, C. rhotheus is the most abundant species of sculpin. C. rhotheus has a cold water-adapted physiology that allows them to live within streams along the Pacific Northwest which are inhabitable for most fish species.

== Life history ==
Sculpins present in freshwater can be categorized into two distinct types of groups based on the stages present in larvae; pelagic or benthic. Torrent sculpins are classified as the benthic group. The C. rhotheus larvae stage disperses slowly and they don't migrate, unlike the pelagic group.

On average, torrent sculpins become sexually mature around age 2. Spawning for C. rhotheus can occur from April to June. Within the lower Columbia River, spawning time was between late May and mid-July; with the average water temperature being 9 °C to 16 °C. Torrent sculpins were assessed for maturity by applying a small amount of pressure to see if milt or eggs were expressed. If males and females expressed these characteristics, or if their abdomens were soft or urogenital pores were swollen, they were classified as sexually mature (adult). C. rhotheus adults continue to guard nests even if egg mortality is high and water levels decline. Males guard nests by attacking any potential intruders that come close to the nest. C. rhotheus males fan the eggs using their pectoral fins and clean them using their anal fins. Sculpin egg nests have been found to be between 5 and 8 m away from the shoreline in a pool on cobble substrate, at 0.9 – 1.8 m depth, with a velocity of 0 – 0.1 m/s. The average diet for the torrent sculpin consists of aquatic invertebrates, with a small number of terrestrial invertebrates. Only 1% of their diet consisted of fish. Torrent sculpins were classified as having a specialized method of foraging.

A study was conducted in 2000 to gather more information regarding the temporal diet changes of the torrent sculpin. The first sampling method occurred in the winter and spring, starting from January and ending in May at one site in 2000. The study site was in the Cedar River at a secondary pool, downstream from the Landsburg Diversion Dam. The method of capture for the torrent sculpin was performed at night by electrofishing or snorkeling with dip nets. The size range of fish caught was between 50 and 150 mm. From January to April, over 85% of the sculpin diet was composed of aquatic insects. Within May, their diet consisted of aquatic insects, other sculpins, and a great percentage of Largescale sucker (Catostomus macrocheilus) eggs.

The summer sampling was performed in August 2006, 2007, and 2012. The fish were collected along the shoreline in the Cedar River. The method of capture for the torrent sculpin was performed during the day using electrofishing equipment. Their diet during this period consisted heavily of sculpin and aquatic insects. For C. rhotheus greater than or equal to 100 mm, sculpin consisted of 90% of their diet. In sizes 50–99 mm, only 8.6% of their diet consisted of sculpin. The data collected suggested that the torrent sculpin were both opportunistic and specialist feeders.

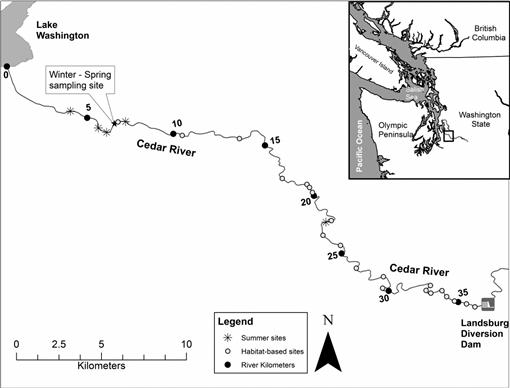
The study site legend for the torrent sculpin diet sampling research.

== Conservation status ==
C. rhotheus is classified as a level S4 for Idaho state conservation rank. S4 stands for a low-risk species that is widespread, but uncommon. They have a large habitat range with high distribution. Their population levels also remain fairly stable, but they have the potential to decline due to certain threats.

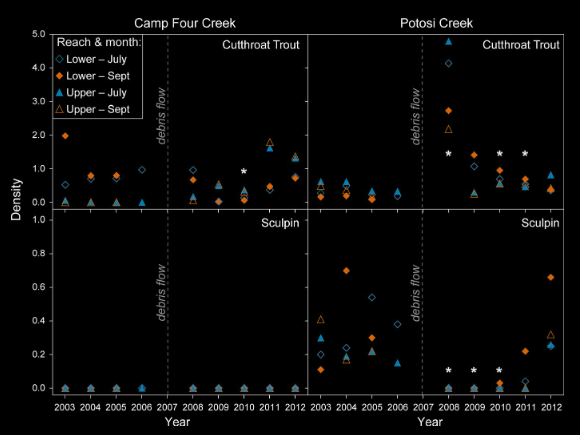
The before and after effects of debris flow in two different rivers. Sculpins were not present within Camp Four Creek. The asterisk depicts extreme change in fish density.

One of those threats is their ability to become stranded. This can be due to their dependency on cobble substrates, their willingness to guard their nests despite lowering water levels, and their ability to hide and spawn under interstitial spaces. This, combined with the fact that torrent sculpins are poor swimmers, makes them vulnerable to becoming stranded.

There is varying information about C. rhotheus colonization after debris flow. In 1996 in Oregon, there were two debris flows caused by storms. The sculpins were found to repopulate the area within 6 years. In another study on the same two debris flows, C. rhotheus densities were found to decline by 70% and have a recovery period longer than 5 years. In a recent study conducted in 2020, they found that torrent sculpins were extirpated after the debris flow; full re-population could take several years, which was slower than what had been detected in trout. Within the same study, it was observed that due to debris flow from heavy storms, the C. rhotheus species was eliminated from two streams at a Washington location. This information could indicate that debris flow would impact the population of the C. rhotheus species.

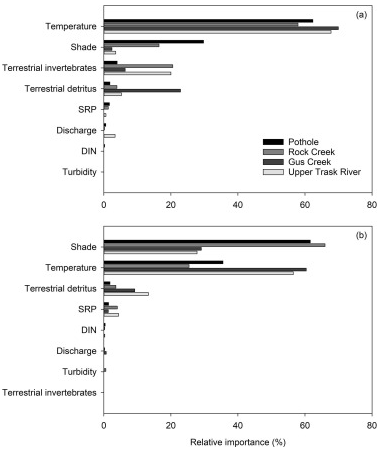
A sensitivity analysis chart with the top rankings being the most influential on the species. The top chart (a) applies to trout, and the bottom (b) applies to sculpin.

In another study regarding the C. rhotheus species, their sensitivity to environmental parameters was investigated. Scientists discovered that stream shading and water temperature were the most influential factors on the C. rhotheus, observing a change in their behavioral patterns. Throughout the test, it was evident that the sculpins were more sensitive to changes in climate conditions. The temperature experiments caused a difference in availability for aquatic invertebrates for the C. rhotheus, impacting the consumption and respiration of the invertebrates. This had the most significant impact on C. rhotheus; the change in temperature was inadvertently affecting the fish through their food source. When compared to trout, they discovered that the benthic prey population would affect the sculpin more than trout.

Sculpins have a low tolerance level for fine sediments and heavy-metal pollution levels. Due to this environmental sensitivity, they are often used as an indicator for high-quality water levels if found in streams or rivers. It was discovered that C. rhotheus age classes continued to decline as the percentage of fine sediments increased. In another study conducted, it was uncovered that sculpins frequently avoided areas where abundant fine sediments were present in the stream or on the banks. Due to this environmental sensitivity, they are currently being used as a biological indicator for monitoring water quality levels in Idaho state.
