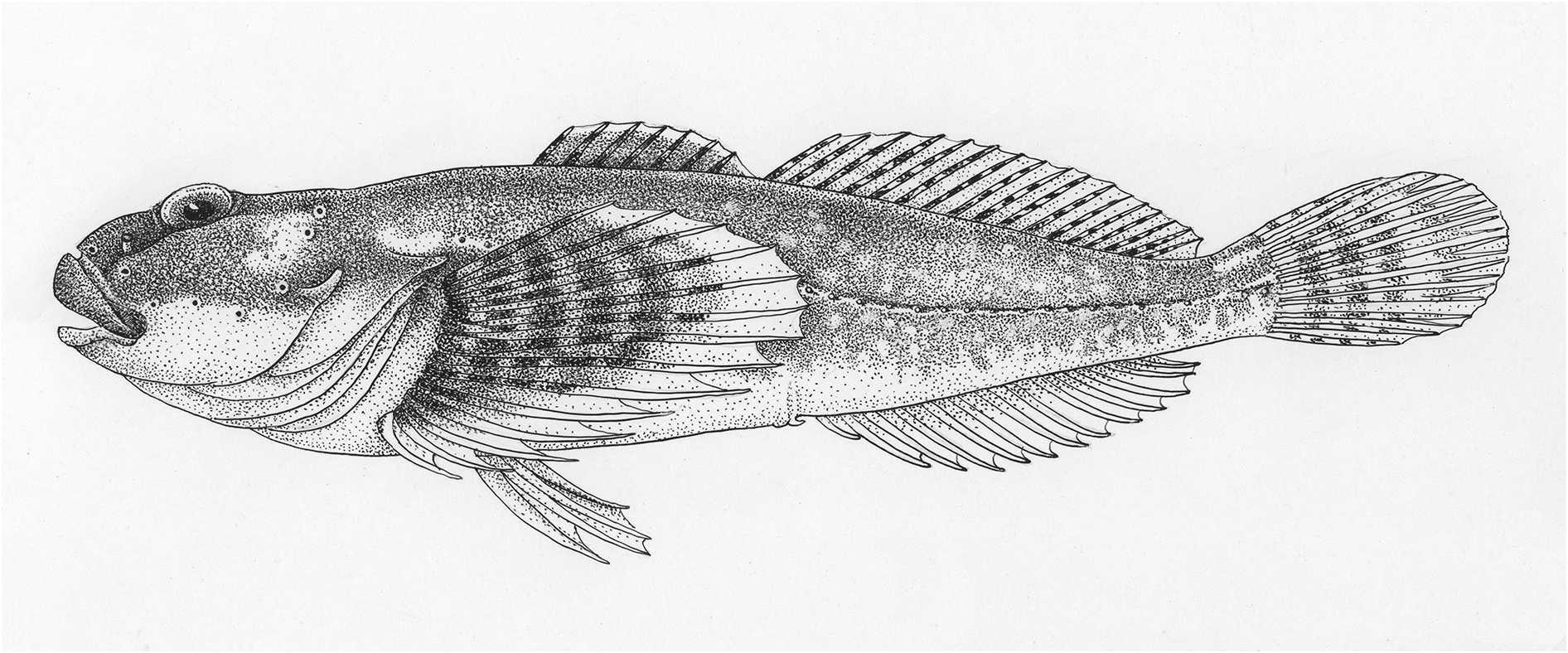

Scientific classification
- Kingdom: Animalia
- Phylum: Chordata
- Class: Actinopterygii
- Order: Perciformes
- Suborder: Cottoidei
- Family: Cottidae
- Genus: Cottus
- Species: C. cyclophthalmus

Binomial name
- Cottus cyclophthalmus Sideleva, Kesminas & Zhidkov, 2022

= Cottus cyclophthalmus =

Species of fish

Cottus cyclophthalmus is a species of freshwater ray-finned fish belonging to the family Cottidae, the typical sculpins. This species is found in northeastern Europe, in the Neman River and Venta River drainages in the basin of the Baltic Sea. This species is similar to the European bullhead (Cottus gobio) but is distinguished by its round, protruding and tubular eyes set close to the front of head; papillae in the skin on the top and sides of the head, a scale-less body without any bony prickles and a complete sensory canal on the flanks which has 32–36 pores. It is classified within the subgenus Cottus and the specific name cyclophthalmus is a compound of cyclos, meaning "round", and ophthalmus, which mean "eye", an allusion to the round, tubular eyes.
