= Knobfin sculpin =

Conservation status
- Least Concern (IUCN 3.1)

Scientific classification
- Kingdom: Animalia
- Phylum: Chordata
- Class: Actinopterygii
- Order: Perciformes
- Suborder: Cottoidei
- Family: Cottidae
- Genus: Cottus
- Species: C. immaculatus

Binomial name
- Cottus immaculatus Kinziger & R. M. Wood, 2010

Species of fish

The knobfin sculpin (Cottus immaculatus) is a species of fish in the family Cottidae. It is found in the United States, inhabiting the Current, Eleven Point, Spring and White river systems in the Ozark Highlands of Arkansas and Missouri. An invasive non-native introduced population is present in the Pomperaug River drainage in Connecticut. It reaches a maximum length of 9.0 cm. It prefers rocky riffles of headwaters and creeks.
