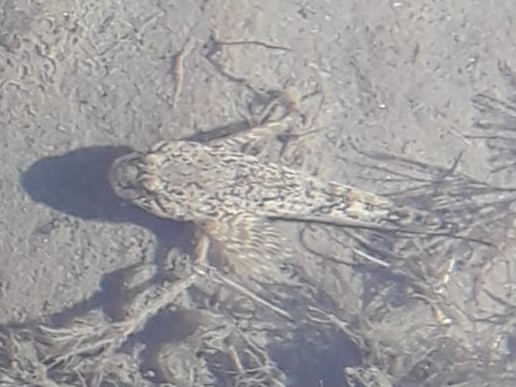

Conservation status
- Least Concern (IUCN 3.1)

Scientific classification
- Kingdom: Animalia
- Phylum: Chordata
- Class: Actinopterygii
- Order: Perciformes
- Suborder: Cottoidei
- Family: Cottidae
- Genus: Cottus
- Species: C. altaicus

Binomial name
- Cottus altaicus Kaschenko, 1899

Synonyms
- Cottus poecilopus altaicus Kaschenko, 1899

= Cottus altaicus =

Species of fish

Cottus altaicus is a species of ray-finned fish belonging to the family Cottidae, the typical sculpins. It is endemic to western Siberia in Russia. Its range includes the Irtysh River basin in the Altai region. It reaches a maximum length of 8.1 cm. It was previously considered a subspecies of the alpine bullhead (Cottus poecilopus).
