= Kanawha sculpin =

Conservation status
- Least Concern (IUCN 3.1)

Scientific classification
- Kingdom: Animalia
- Phylum: Chordata
- Class: Actinopterygii
- Order: Perciformes
- Suborder: Cottoidei
- Family: Cottidae
- Genus: Cottus
- Species: C. kanawhae

Binomial name
- Cottus kanawhae C. R. Robins, 2005

Species of fish

The Kanawha sculpin (Cottus kanawhae) is a species of freshwater ray-finned fish belonging to the family Cottidae, the typical sculpins. It is found in the United States, inhabiting the New River of Virginia and West Virginia. It reaches a maximum length of 11.0 cm. It prefers rocky areas of limestone streams and cave streams.
