= Cottus metae =

Conservation status
- Near Threatened (IUCN 3.1)

Scientific classification
- Kingdom: Animalia
- Phylum: Chordata
- Class: Actinopterygii
- Order: Perciformes
- Suborder: Cottoidei
- Family: Cottidae
- Genus: Cottus
- Species: C. metae

Binomial name
- Cottus metae Freyhof, Kottelat and Nolte, 2005

Species of fish

Cottus metae is a species of freshwater ray-finned fish belonging to the family Cottidae, the typical sculpins. It inhabits the upper Sava River system in the Danube basin. It reaches a maximum length of 9.7 cm (3.8 in). It prefers small streams to medium-sized rivers. This species was described as a separate species from the European bullhead (C. gobio) in 2005 by Jörg Freyhof, Maurice Kottelat and Arne W. Nolte. The specific name "honours the Slovenian biologist Meta Povž, in recognition of her assistance to the authors in a variety of projects".
