= Tallapoosa sculpin =

Conservation status
- Least Concern (IUCN 3.1)

Scientific classification
- Kingdom: Animalia
- Phylum: Chordata
- Class: Actinopterygii
- Order: Perciformes
- Suborder: Cottoidei
- Family: Cottidae
- Genus: Cottus
- Species: C. tallapoosae

Binomial name
- Cottus tallapoosae Neely, J. D. Williams & Mayden, 2007

Species of fish

The Tallapoosa sculpin (Cottus tallapoosae) is a species of freshwater ray-finned fish belonging to the family Cottidae, the typical sculpins. It is found in the United States in the Tallapoosa River drainage above the Fall Line in east central Alabama and west-central Georgia. It reaches a maximum length of 7.7 cm. It prefers rocky shoals and riffles of small upland streams.
