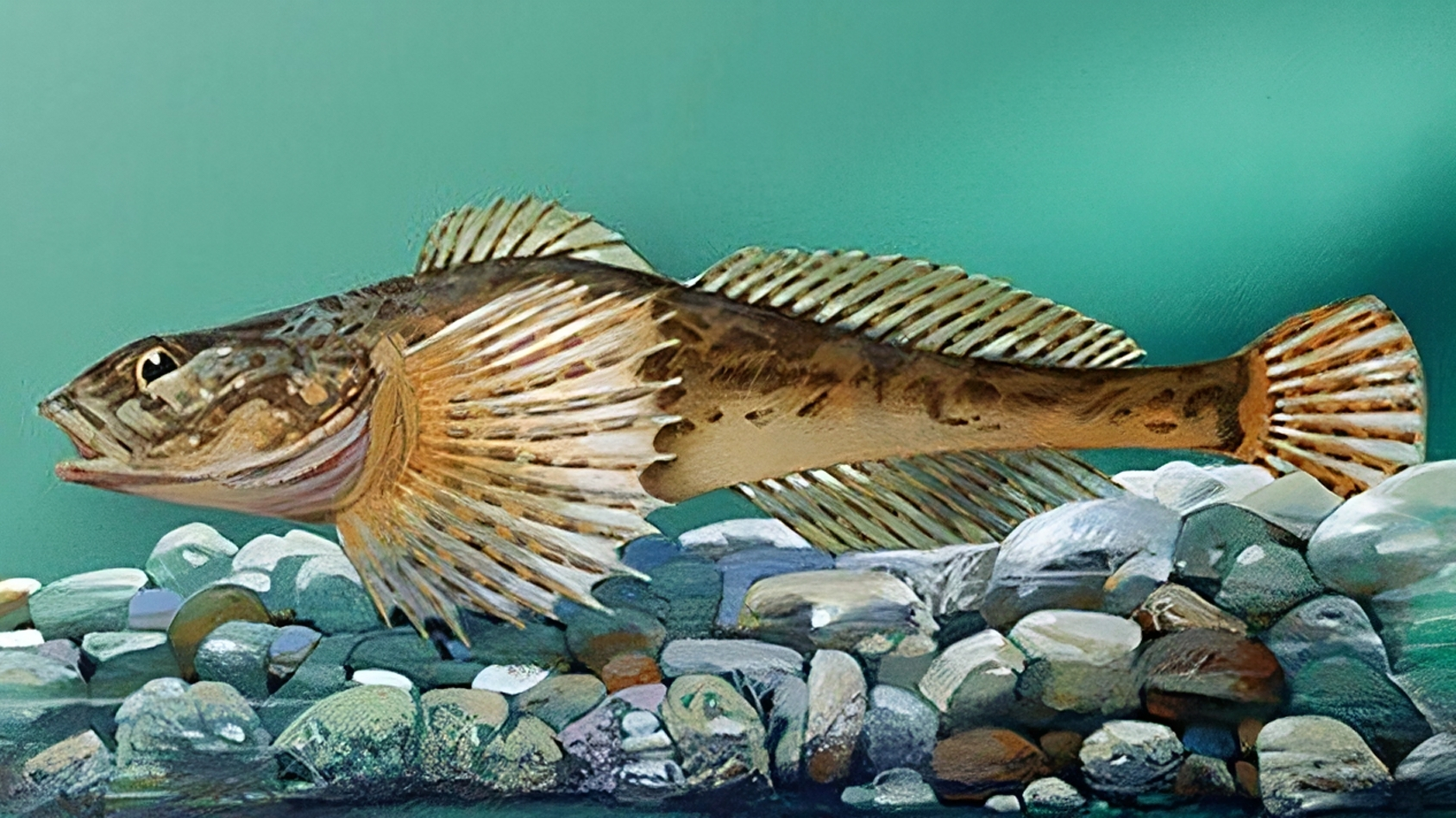
- on post stamp of Kyrgyzstan

Scientific classification
- Kingdom: Animalia
- Phylum: Chordata
- Class: Actinopterygii
- Order: Perciformes
- Suborder: Cottoidei
- Family: Cottidae
- Genus: Cottus
- Species: C. jaxartensis

Binomial name
- Cottus jaxartensis Berg, 1916

Synonyms
- Cottus nasalis Berg, 1933; Cottus gobio jaxartensis Berg, 1916

= Cottus jaxartensis =

Species of fish

Cottus jaxartensis is a species of freshwater ray-finned fish belonging to the family Cottidae, the typical sculpins. This fish is endemic to the basin of the Syr-Darya in Uzbekistan, Kazakhstan and Kyrgyzstan. This species is classified within the nominate subgenus of the genus Cottus and it is closely related to the European bullhead (Cottus gobio) of which it was considered as subspecies. The specific name, jaxartensis, means "of the Jaxartes", the ancient name of the Syr Darya River.
