= Turkestan sculpin =

Conservation status
- Least Concern (IUCN 3.1)

Scientific classification
- Kingdom: Animalia
- Phylum: Chordata
- Class: Actinopterygii
- Order: Perciformes
- Suborder: Cottoidei
- Family: Cottidae
- Genus: Cottus
- Species: C. spinulosus

Binomial name
- Cottus spinulosus Kessler, 1872

Species of fish

The Turkestan sculpin (Cottus spinulosus) is a species of freshwater ray-finned fish belonging to the family Cottidae, the typical sculpins. It is found in the basin of the upper Syr Darya River. It reaches a maximum length of 10.3 cm
