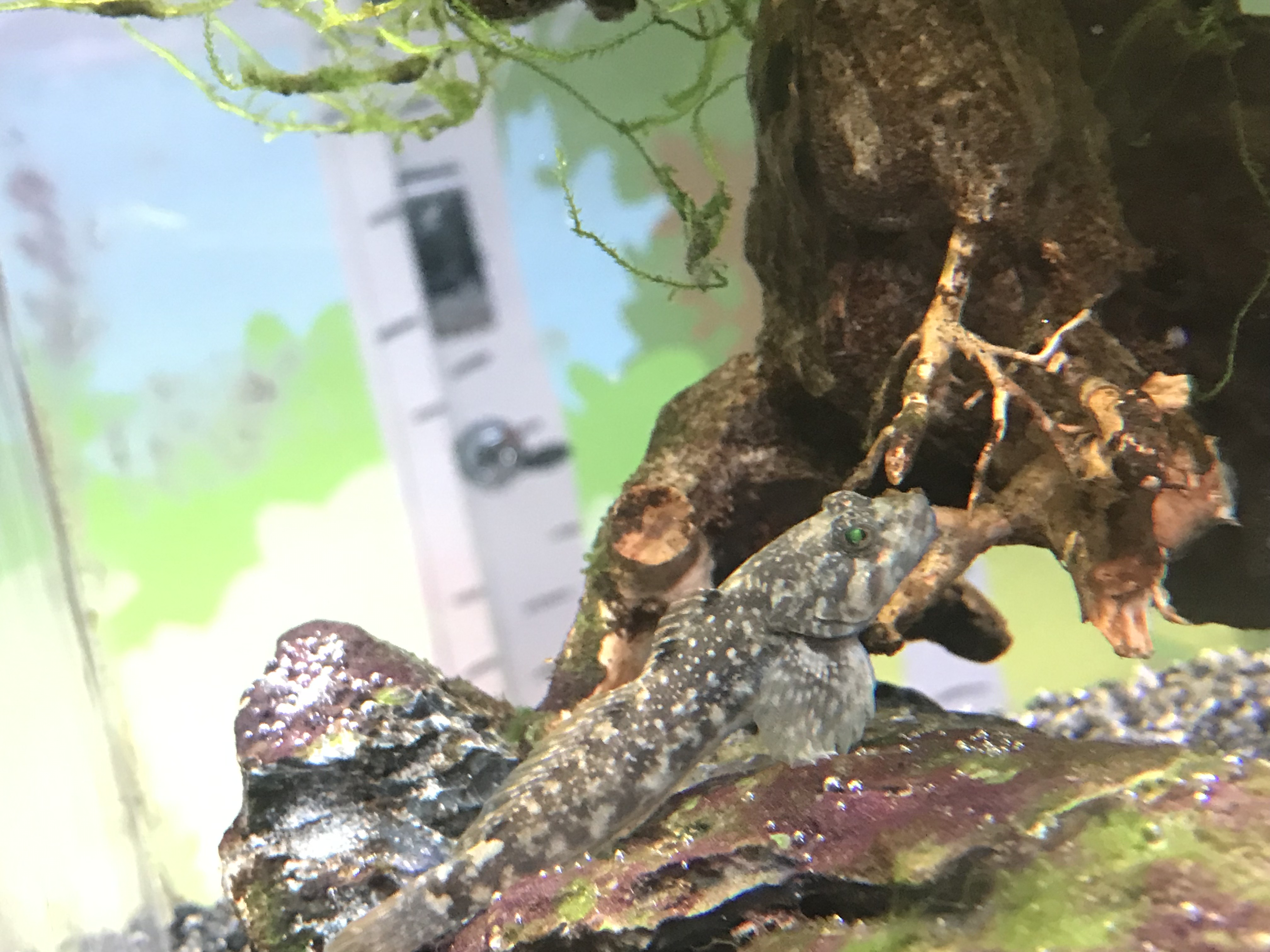

Scientific classification
- Kingdom: Animalia
- Phylum: Chordata
- Class: Actinopterygii
- Order: Perciformes
- Suborder: Cottoidei
- Family: Cottidae
- Genus: Cottus
- Species: C. koreanus

Binomial name
- Cottus koreanus R. Fujii, Y. Choi & Yabe, 2005

= Cottus koreanus =

Species of fish

Cottus koreanus is a species of freshwater ray-finned fish belonging to the family Cottidae, the typical sculpins. It is endemic to Korea. It reaches a maximum length of 8.2 cm.
