= Malheur sculpin =

Conservation status
- Least Concern (IUCN 3.1)

Scientific classification
- Kingdom: Animalia
- Phylum: Chordata
- Class: Actinopterygii
- Order: Perciformes
- Suborder: Cottoidei
- Family: Cottidae
- Genus: Cottus
- Species: C. bendirei

Binomial name
- Cottus bendirei T. H. Bean, 1881

Species of fish

The Malheur sculpin (Cottus bendirei) is a species of fish in the family Cottidae. It is found in the United States, inhabiting the Harney Basin, and the Snake River basin, including Malheur River in Oregon and Idaho. It reaches a maximum length of 13.0 cm. It prefers rocky riffles of headwaters and creeks.
