= Shorthead sculpin =

Conservation status
- Least Concern (IUCN 3.1)

Scientific classification
- Kingdom: Animalia
- Phylum: Chordata
- Class: Actinopterygii
- Division: Teleostei
- Order: Perciformes
- Suborder: Cottoidei
- Family: Cottidae
- Genus: Cottus
- Species: C. confusus

Binomial name
- Cottus confusus R. M. Bailey & C. E. Bond, 1963

Species of fish

The shorthead sculpin (Cottus confusus) is a species of fish in the family Cottidae. Shorthead sculpins are small, bottom-dwelling fish, typically measuring around 13 to 15 cm in length. They have large heads, fanlike pectoral fins, and a narrow caudal peduncle. Their physical characteristics include 7–9 dorsal spines, 15–19 dorsal soft rays, 10–14 anal soft rays, and palatine teeth. Their coloration is a mix of dark brown and yellow.

It is found in the United States and Canada, inhabiting the Columbia River drainage in Washington, Oregon, Idaho, Montana, and British Columbia. It is also found in the Puget Sound drainage of Washington and in California. They will inhabit water where the temperatures range from 15.5 °C to 23.9 °C. They reach a maximum length of 15.0 cm. They will reside in rocky riffles of cold, clear streams, and occasionally lakes. They are sedentary, and nocturnal. Shorthead sculpins inhabit cold and cool water streams embedded with gravel-rocky substrates. In Idaho, they are found year-round, while in other regions they are found primarily in the spring.

== Diet ==
The shorthead sculpin's diet resembles that of other sculpins. They are benthic invertivores, meaning they eat primarily aquatic insects, small fish, or trout and salmon eggs. They spend the days sleeping under rocks and prey on the small invertebrates, at night, making them nocturnal hunters.

== Reproduction ==
Females reach sexual maturity around two to three years, and males two years of age. Spawning occurs in the spring when water temperature ranges from 8 to 15° C. Sculpins are nest builders. The males will prepare a nest, typically built underneath rocks. The female will lay the eggs, leave, and then the male fertilizes the eggs. The male stays to guard and care for the eggs.

== Conservation status ==
These fish have been assigned a conservation status of 'least concern' in the United States. The main threats to the species are extended periods of low flows and runoff from mining and industrial activities. Another threat is non-native species. Researchers have found that largemouth bass, walleye, yellow perch, northern pike, and pumpkinseed pose a moderate to high ecological threat to the shorthead sculpin.
