= Chattahoochee sculpin =

Conservation status
- Least Concern (IUCN 3.1)

Scientific classification
- Kingdom: Animalia
- Phylum: Chordata
- Class: Actinopterygii
- Order: Perciformes
- Suborder: Cottoidei
- Family: Cottidae
- Genus: Cottus
- Species: C. chattahoochee

Binomial name
- Cottus chattahoochee Neely, J. D. Williams & Mayden, 2007

Species of fish

The Chattahoochee sculpin (Cottus chattahoochee) is a species of fish in the family Cottidae. It is found in the United States, inhabiting the Chattahoochee River, above the Fall Line in Georgia. It reaches a maximum length of 8.5 cm. It prefers rocky riffles of headwaters and creeks.
