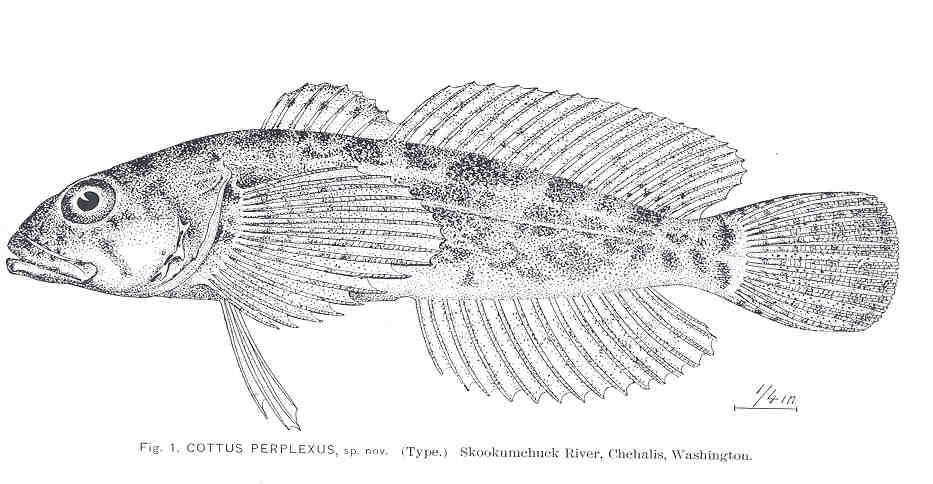

Conservation status
- Least Concern (IUCN 3.1)

Scientific classification
- Kingdom: Animalia
- Phylum: Chordata
- Class: Actinopterygii
- Order: Perciformes
- Suborder: Cottoidei
- Family: Cottidae
- Genus: Cottus
- Species: C. perplexus

Binomial name
- Cottus perplexus C. H. Gilbert & Evermann, 1894

= Reticulate sculpin =

Species of fish

The reticulate sculpin (Cottus perplexus) is a species of freshwater ray-finned fish belonging to the family Cottidae, the typical sculpins. It is found in the United States, inhabiting Pacific Slope drainages from the Snohomish River and Puget Sound in Washington to the Rogue River system in Oregon and California. It reaches a maximum length of 10.0 cm. This sculpin occurs in a variety of habitats, but mainly occurs in the slower sections of coastal headwaters, creeks, and small rivers. It prefers faster water with rubble or gravel substrate, but occurs in pools and along stream edges when other sculpin species are present. Often it occurs in clear cold water in forested areas. Its ideal habitat is cold creeks in old-growth forest, with plenty of riffles and runs. This species is tolerant of variable water temperatures and salinities. Where other sculpin species are common, spawning occurs in slow-flowing areas; where other sculpin species are rare or absent, spawning usually occurs in riffles.
