= Black sculpin =

Conservation status
- Least Concern (IUCN 3.1)

Scientific classification
- Kingdom: Animalia
- Phylum: Chordata
- Class: Actinopterygii
- Order: Perciformes
- Suborder: Cottoidei
- Family: Cottidae
- Genus: Cottus
- Species: C. baileyi

Binomial name
- Cottus baileyi Robins, 1961

Species of fish

The black sculpin (Cottus baileyi) is a species of freshwater ray-finned fish belonging to the family Cottidae, the typical sculpins. It is endemic to the United States. Its range includes the extreme upper Clinch and Holston River systems in western Virginia and just into northeastern Tennessee. It reaches a maximum length of 8 cm (3.1 in).

The black sculpin was first formally described in 1961 by C. Richard Robins, with its type locality given as "Middle fork of Holston River, 6 miles east-northeast of Marion, Smyth County, Virginia". Its specific name honors the ichthyologist Reeve Maclaren Bailey, recognising his contribution to the study of American freshwater fishes.
