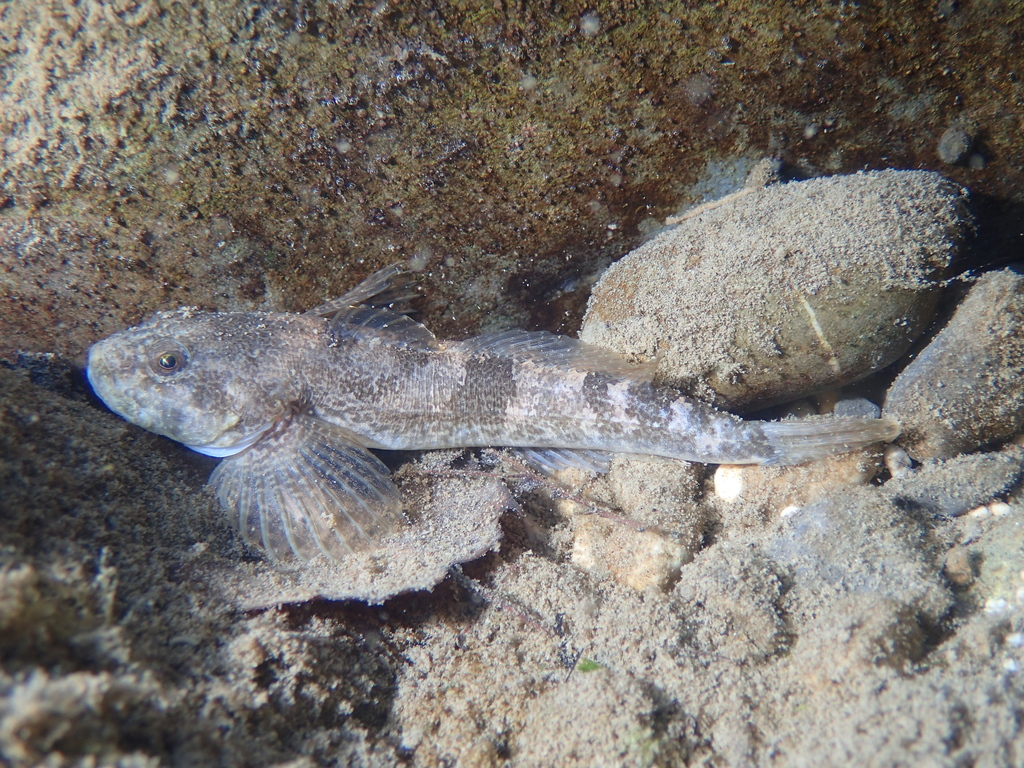

Conservation status
- Endangered (IUCN 3.1)

Scientific classification
- Kingdom: Animalia
- Phylum: Chordata
- Class: Actinopterygii
- Order: Perciformes
- Suborder: Cottoidei
- Family: Cottidae
- Genus: Cottus
- Species: C. sabaudicus

Binomial name
- Cottus sabaudicus Sideleva, 2009

= Cottus sabaudicus =

Species of fish

Cottus sabaudicus, the Rhone sculpin, is a species of freshwater ray-finned fish belonging to the family Cottidae, the typical sculpins. It is endemic to France where it inhabits the Rhone River.
