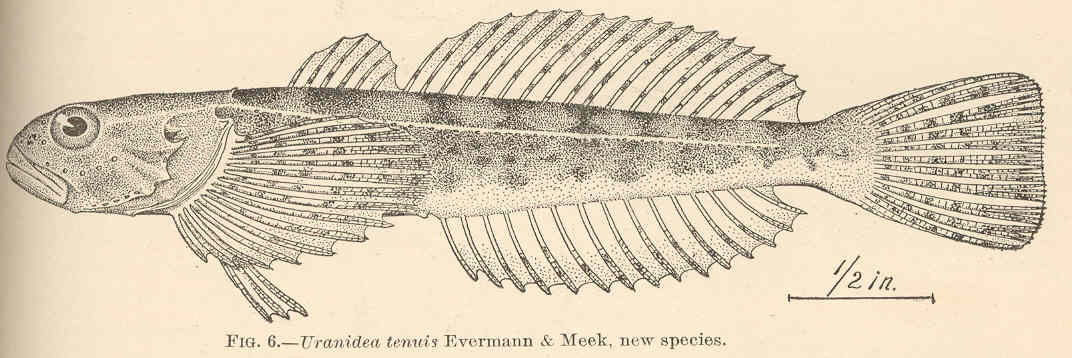

Conservation status
- Vulnerable (IUCN 3.1)

Scientific classification
- Kingdom: Animalia
- Phylum: Chordata
- Class: Actinopterygii
- Order: Perciformes
- Suborder: Cottoidei
- Family: Cottidae
- Genus: Cottus
- Species: C. tenuis

Binomial name
- Cottus tenuis (Evermann & Meek, 1898)

Synonyms
- Uranidea tenuis Evermann & Meek, 1898

= Slender sculpin =

Species of fish

The slender sculpin (Cottus tenuis) is a species of freshwater ray-finned fish belonging to the family Cottidae, the typical sculpins. It is endemic to the United States, occurring only in the upper Klamath Lake river drainage in Oregon. It is found along lake shores over mud, sand and gravel, and in the riffles, runs and pools of streams and rivers. It reaches a maximum length of 9 cm.
