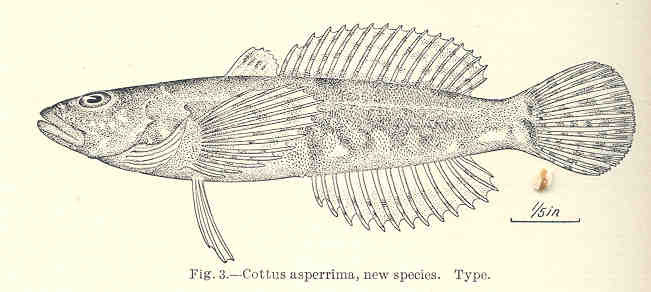

Conservation status
- Near Threatened (IUCN 3.1)

Scientific classification
- Kingdom: Animalia
- Phylum: Chordata
- Class: Actinopterygii
- Order: Perciformes
- Suborder: Cottoidei
- Family: Cottidae
- Genus: Cottus
- Species: C. asperrimus

Binomial name
- Cottus asperrimus Rutter, 1908

= Rough sculpin =

Species of fish

The rough sculpin (Cottus asperrimus) is a species of fish in the family Cottidae. It is endemic to California in the United States. Its habitat includes spring-fed tributaries of the Pit River system in northeastern Shasta County, California, including the Fall River and its major tributary, the Tule River. It grows to 9.6 cm (3.8 in) total length.
