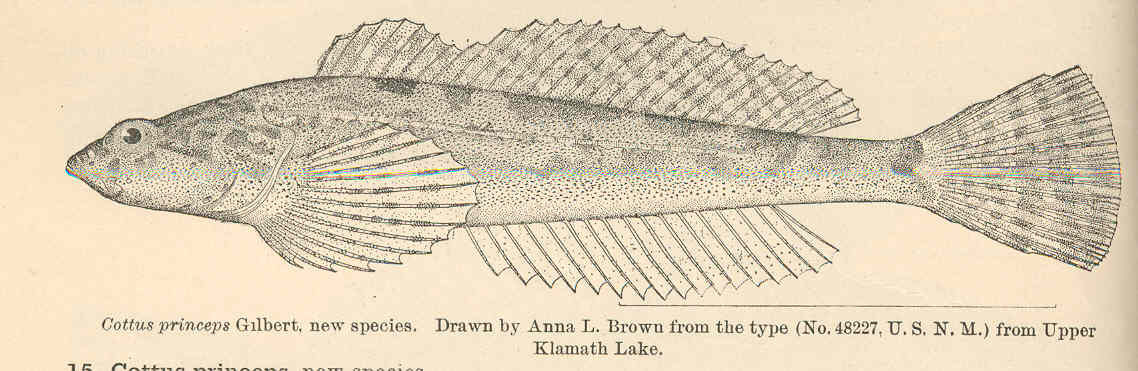

Conservation status
- Data Deficient (IUCN 3.1)

Scientific classification
- Kingdom: Animalia
- Phylum: Chordata
- Class: Actinopterygii
- Division: Teleostei
- Order: Perciformes
- Suborder: Cottoidei
- Family: Cottidae
- Genus: Cottus
- Species: C. princeps

Binomial name
- Cottus princeps C. H. Gilbert, 1898

= Klamath Lake sculpin =

Species of fish

The Klamath Lake sculpin (Cottus princeps) is a species of freshwater ray-finned fish belonging to the family Cottidae, or the typical sculpins. It is endemic to Agency and Upper Klamath Lakes in Oregon, US. It reaches a maximum length of 7.0 cm. The Klamath lake sculpin prefers rocky and sandy shores of the lakes it inhabits.
