= Cottus koshewnikowi =

Conservation status
- Least Concern (IUCN 3.1)

Scientific classification
- Kingdom: Animalia
- Phylum: Chordata
- Class: Actinopterygii
- Order: Perciformes
- Suborder: Cottoidei
- Family: Cottidae
- Genus: Cottus
- Species: C. koshewnikowi

Binomial name
- Cottus koshewnikowi Gratzianov, 1907

Synonyms
- Cottus gobio microcephalus Kessler, 1868; Cottus gobio milvensis Soldatov, 1924

Species of fish

Cottus koshewnikowi, Koshewnikow's sculpin, is a species of freshwater ray-finned fish belonging to the family Cottidae, the typical sculpins. It inhabits the upper Volga drainage in Russia and drainages of the northern and eastern Baltic Sea from Estonia eastward and northward to Finland and northern Sweden. In coastal waters of the Northern Baltic Sea it forms hybrid populations with the more western bullhead species Cottus gobio (sensu stricto).

It reaches a maximum length of 10 cm (3.9 in). It prefers medium-sized rivers to small streams, and lake shores.
