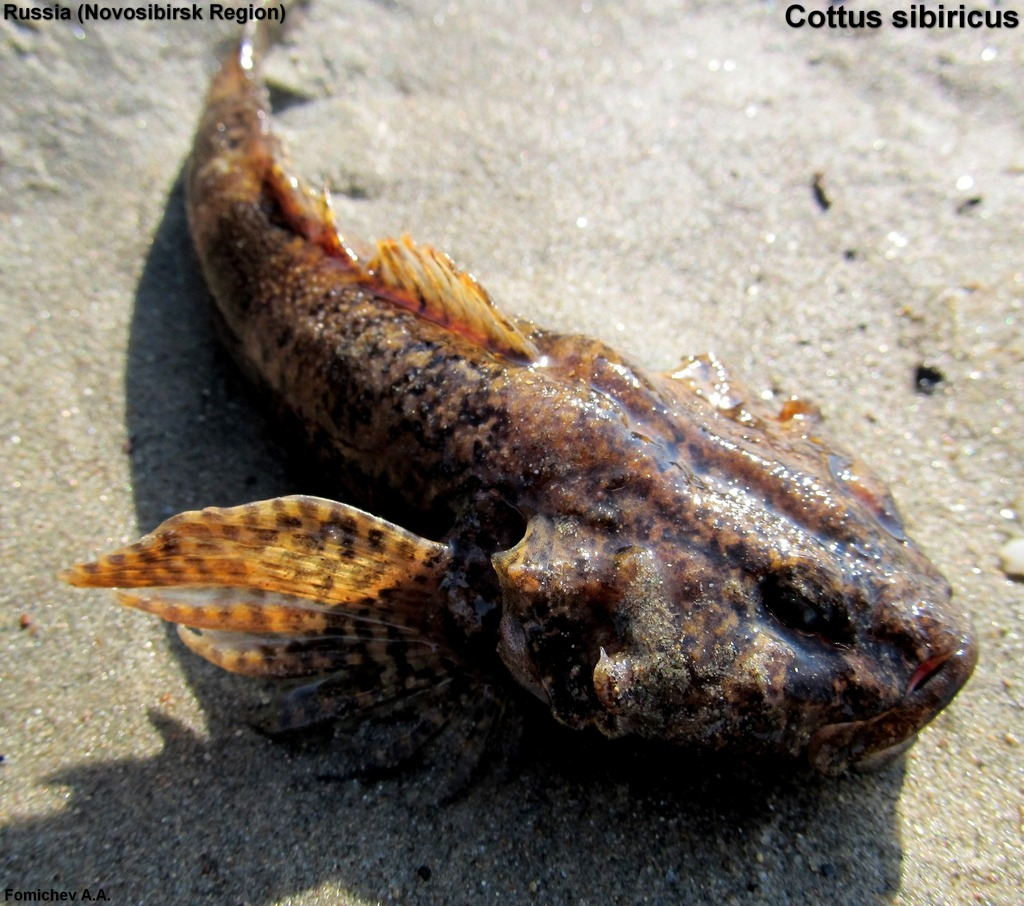
- Novosibirsk Region

Conservation status
- Least Concern (IUCN 3.1)

Scientific classification
- Kingdom: Animalia
- Phylum: Chordata
- Class: Actinopterygii
- Order: Perciformes
- Suborder: Cottoidei
- Family: Cottidae
- Genus: Cottus
- Species: C. sibiricus

Binomial name
- Cottus sibiricus Warpachowski, 1889

= Siberian sculpin =

Species of fish

The Siberian sculpin (Cottus sibiricus) is a species of freshwater ray-finned fish belonging to the family Cottidae, the typical sculpins. It is found in Siberian river basins of the Arctic Ocean from the Ob to Yana rivers. It reaches a maximum length of 15.0 cm.
