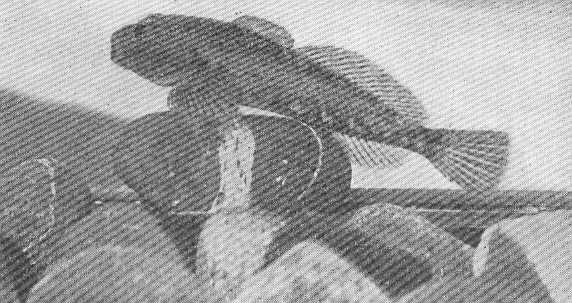

Conservation status
- Least Concern (IUCN 3.1)

Scientific classification
- Kingdom: Animalia
- Phylum: Chordata
- Class: Actinopterygii
- Order: Perciformes
- Suborder: Cottoidei
- Family: Cottidae
- Genus: Cottus
- Species: C. gulosus

Binomial name
- Cottus gulosus (Girard, 1854)

Synonyms
- Cottopsis gulosus Girard, 1854; Centridermichthys gulosus (Girard, 1854)

= Inland riffle sculpin =

Species of fish

The inland riffle sculpin (Cottus gulosus) is a species of fish in the family Cottidae. It is found in the United States, inhabiting the lower Columbia River drainage in Washington, to Morro Bay in California. It is also found in the Puget Sound drainage in Washington. It reaches a maximum length of 11.0 cm. It prefers rocky riffles of headwaters and creeks.

== Taxonomy ==
The inland riffle sculpin was first formally described as Cottopsis gulosus by the French biologist Charles Frédéric Girard with its type locality given as the San Joaquin River in California. This species is classified by some authorities in the subgenus Cottopsis.

== Description ==
Inland riffle sculpins have a brown/tan coloration mottled with dark brown spots and reddish hues around their fins. They have large mouths with a single median chin pore, and often times will feature joined dorsal fins. Despite not being considered particularly definitive in their appearance, riffle sculpins can still be identified through notes regarding specific spotting and ray numbers. In addition to their mottled color, riffle sculpins have a large black spot near the end of the first dorsal fin. They have 16-19 rays in their second dorsal fin, 15-16 rays in each of their pectoral fins, and 12-16 rays in their anal fin. Spawning male riffle sculpins can be seen to have a darker appearance coupled with an orange hue at the edge of the first dorsal fin.

== Habitat ==
Inland riffle sculpins can often be found in headwater streams with riffles. When cohabiting alongside prickly sculpin, riffle sculpin choose to move towards the cooler areas of the stream. However, they are also found to have a preference for permanent streams with stable temperatures of 25-26 °C. When available, riffle sculpins will move towards areas of cover, such as rocks or overhanging banks.

Riffles act as preferred habitats to multiple species due to the many prey organisms that live in the area. However, the division of habitat within riffle sculpin and other species such as the speckled dace is driven primarily by temperature, as the metabolic rates of the sculpin rapidly increase alongside it.

== Diet ==
Inland riffle sculpins maintain a diet primarily built of benthic invertebrates and active insect larvae. This includes insects like mayflies and caddisflies. If easily available, riffle sculpins will prey on small fish and amphipods, typically feeding during the night.
