= Jörg Freyhof =

German ichthyologist

Jörg Arthur Freyhof (born 4 November 1964 in Ludwigshafen) is a German ichthyologist specializing on Old World cypriniform fishes. Freyhof has worked at the Alexander Koenig Research Museum, Bonn, and since 2000 he has been employed at the Leibniz Institute of Freshwater Ecology and Inland Fisheries, Berlin.

== Bibliography ==
- Maurice Kottelat & Jörg Freyhof (2007) Handbook of European Freshwater Fishes Published by the authors. ISBN 978-2-8399-0298-4.
- Jörg Freyhof & Emma Brooks (2011) European Red List of Freshwater Fishes Luxembourg: Publications Office of the European Union. ISBN 978-92-79-20200-1

== See also ==
- Category:Taxa named by Jörg Freyhof
