= Osam =

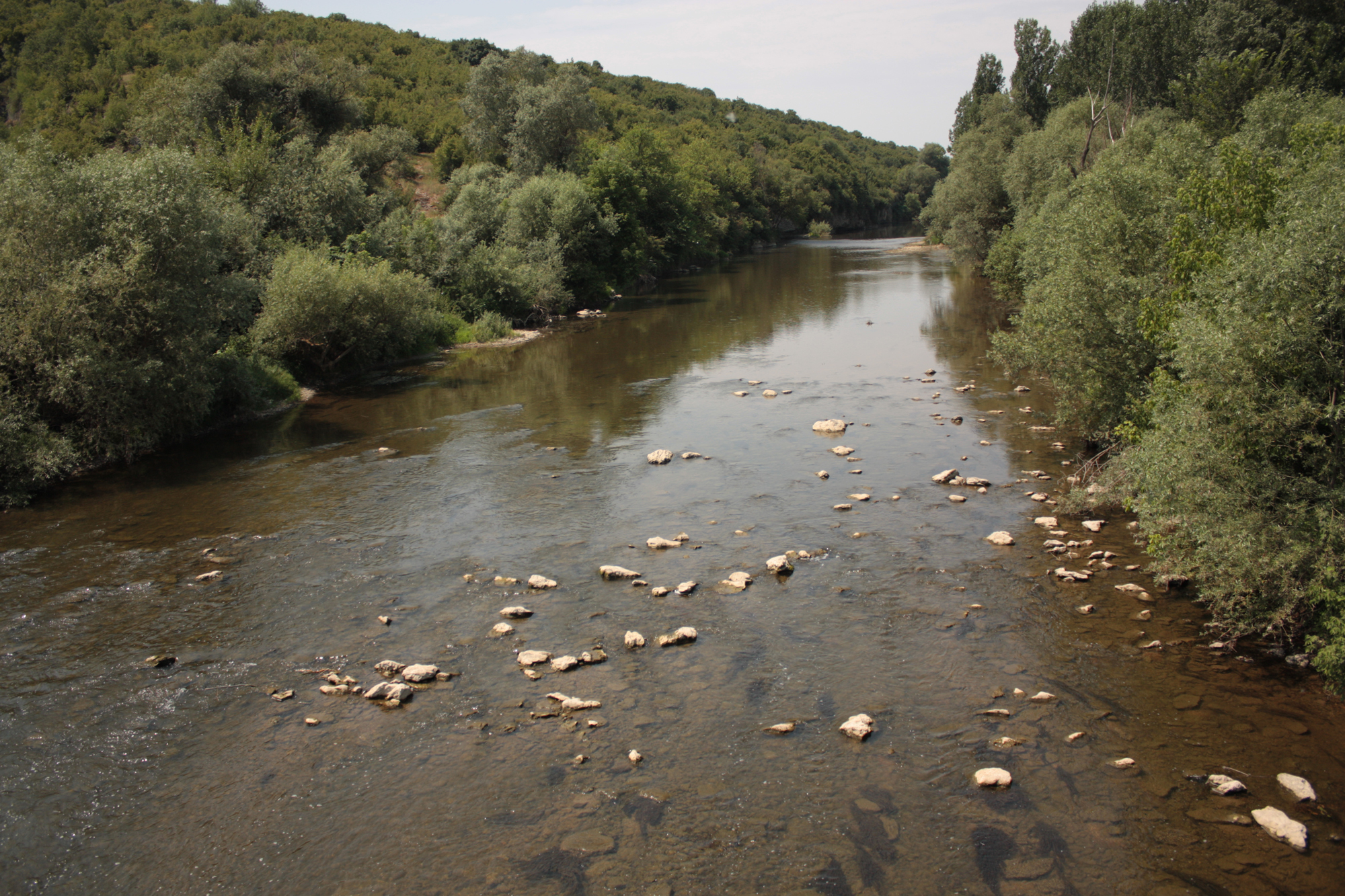

Location
- Country: Bulgaria

Physical characteristics
- Source
  - location: SW of Levski Peak, Balkan Mountains
  - coordinates: 42°43′10.92″N 24°46′48″E
  - elevation: 1,880 m (6,170 ft)
- Mouth
  - location: Danube
  - coordinates: 43°42′5.04″N 24°51′19.08″E
  - elevation: 22 m (72 ft)
- Length: 314 km (195 mi)
- Basin size: 2,824 km^{2} (1,090 sq mi)

Basin features
- Progression: Danube→ Black Sea

The Osam (Bulgarian: Осъм [ˈɔsɐm]) is a river in northern Bulgaria, a right tributary of the Danube. Its length including the main stem, the Cherni (Black) Osam, is 314 km, making it the fifth longest river in Bulgaria. The river proper, formed by the confluence of the Cherni and Beli (White) Osam, is 278 km.

== Geography ==
=== Course ===
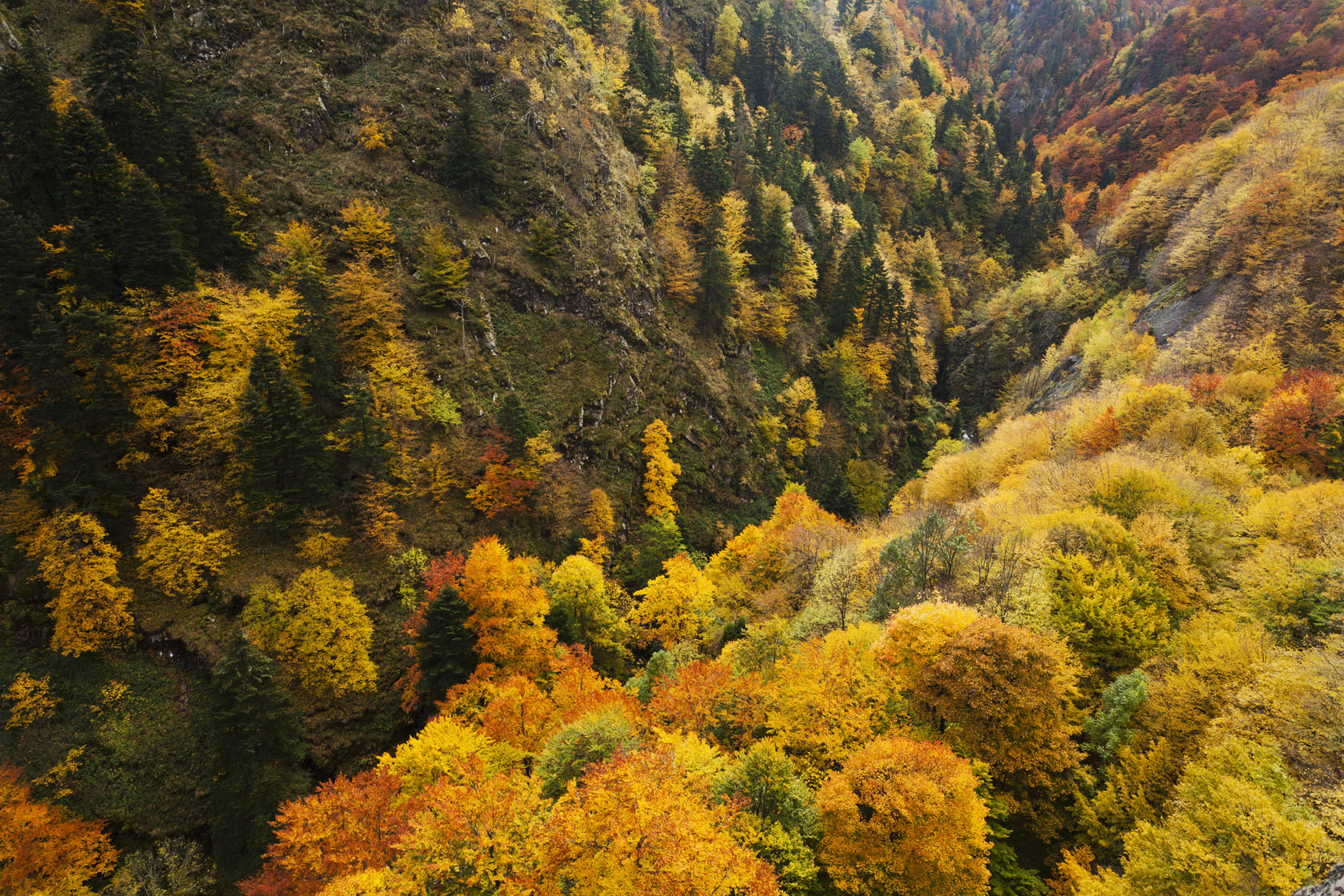
Gorge of the Cherni Osam

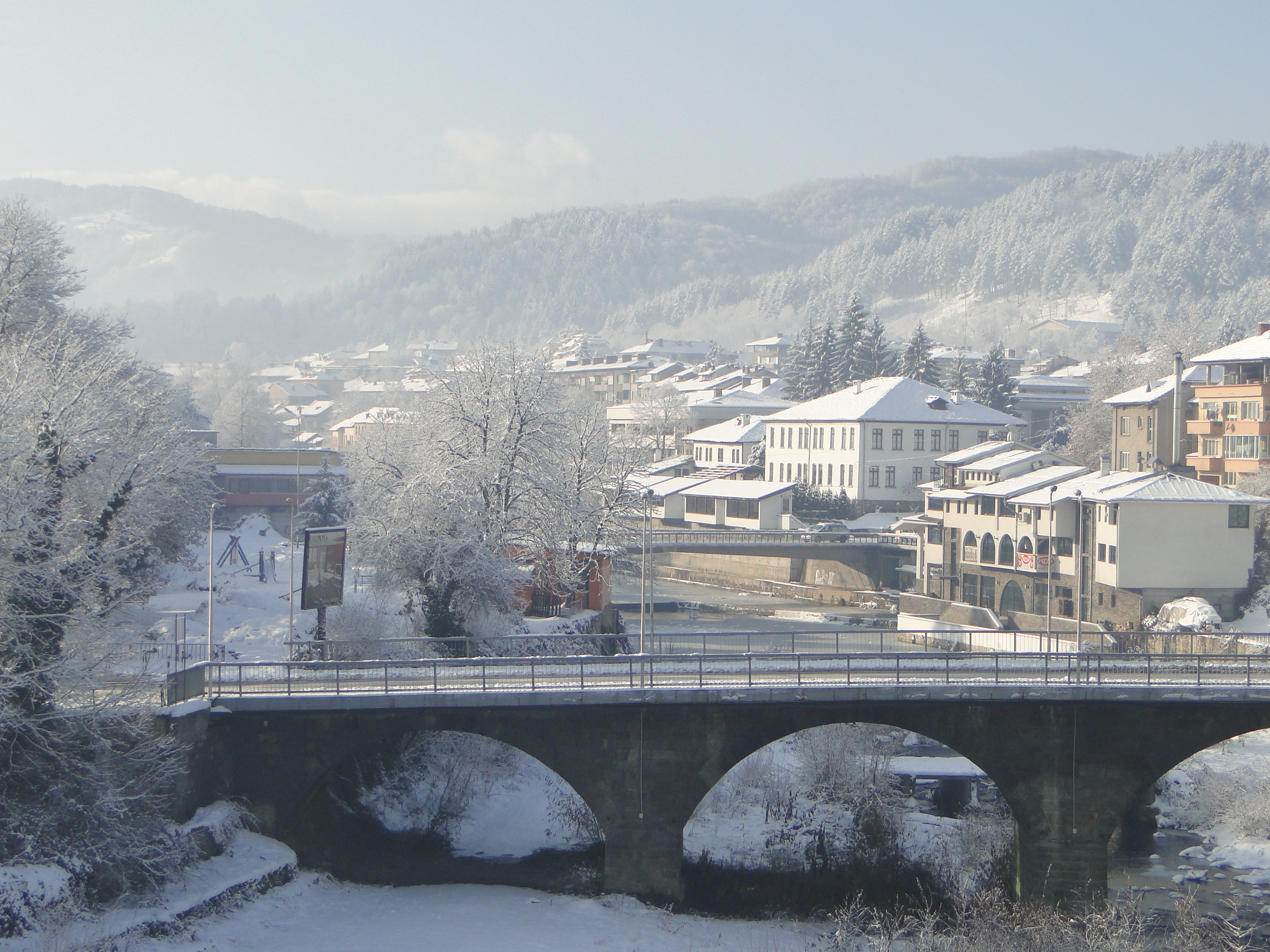
The Osam at Troyan

The main stem, the Cherni Osam, is 36 km long and takes its source at an altitude of 1,880 m on the southwestern foothills of the summit of Levski (2,166 m) in the Balkan Mountains and flows north. The other stem, the 28 km long Beli Osam, springs at an altitude of 1,560 m northeast of the summit of Ushite (1,637 m) in the Troyan section of the Balkan Mountains and flows northeast in a deep forested valley.

The river proper forms by the confluence of the Beli Osam (left branch) and the Cherni Osam (right branch) at an altitude of 371 m in the northern outskirts of the town of Troyan. It flows north to the town of Lovech and then turns northeast until the town of Levski. In the fore-Balkan between Troyan and Aleksandrovo the Osam flows in a deep, ravine-like valley. Downstream of Aleksandrovo the river enters the Danubian Plain, forming an asymmetrical valley with steeper right and gentler left slopes. From Levski the Osam's general direction is northwest. The riverbed widens, and due to the small gradient, it meanders in all directions. In this section, the riverbed has been corrected with water protection dikes; the bottom changes from stony to sandy. It flows into the Danube at an altitude of 22 m between the town of Nikopol to the east and the village of Cherkovitsa to the west.

=== Basin and hydrology ===
The Osam drainage basin covers a territory of 2,824 km^{2} or 0.35% of the Danube's total and borders the basins of the Vit to the west and the Barata and the Yantra to the east and northeast, all three of the Danube drainage, as well as the Maritsa basin to the south of the Balkan Mountain's main water divide. In the Balkan Mountains the river basin is covered mainly with deciduous forests. Further north in the fore-Balkan section, the catchment area of the Osam is well forested and grassed and high-stemmed woods gradually give way to low-stemmed ones. Its main tributaries are the Shavarna (30 km), and the Lomya (39 km).

The Osam has a mixed feed of snow, rain and karst waters. Snow and rain feed is prevalent in the Balkan Mountains and the fore-Balkan, rain in the Danubian Plain and underground karst water in the fore-Balkan. High water is in March–June due to the snowmelt in the mountains; low water is in August–October. The average annual discharge is 9.8 m^{3}/s at Troyan and 12.6 m^{3}/s at Gradishte. The discharge of the Cherni Osam is 3.75 m^{3}/s; the discharge of the Beli Osam reaches 3.45 m^{3}/s.

== Settlements and economy ==
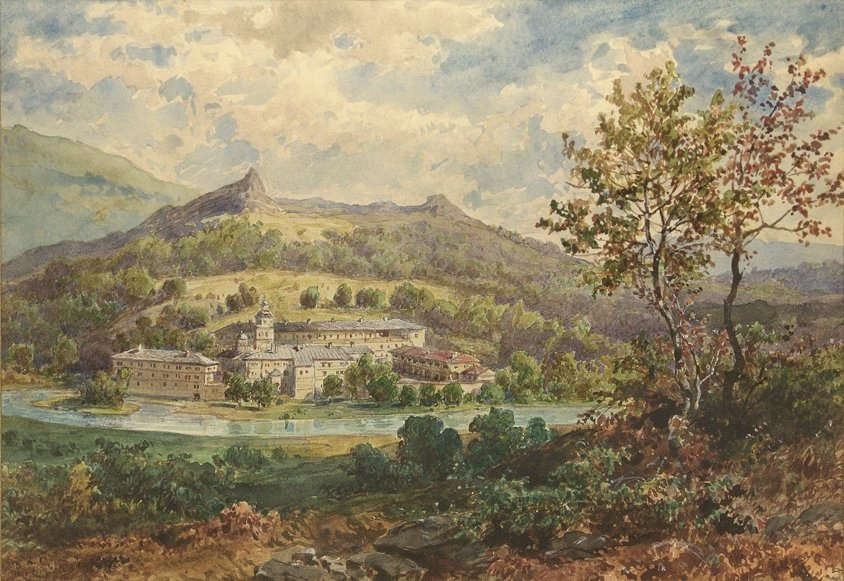
The Osam at the Troyan Monastery by Felix Philipp Kanitz

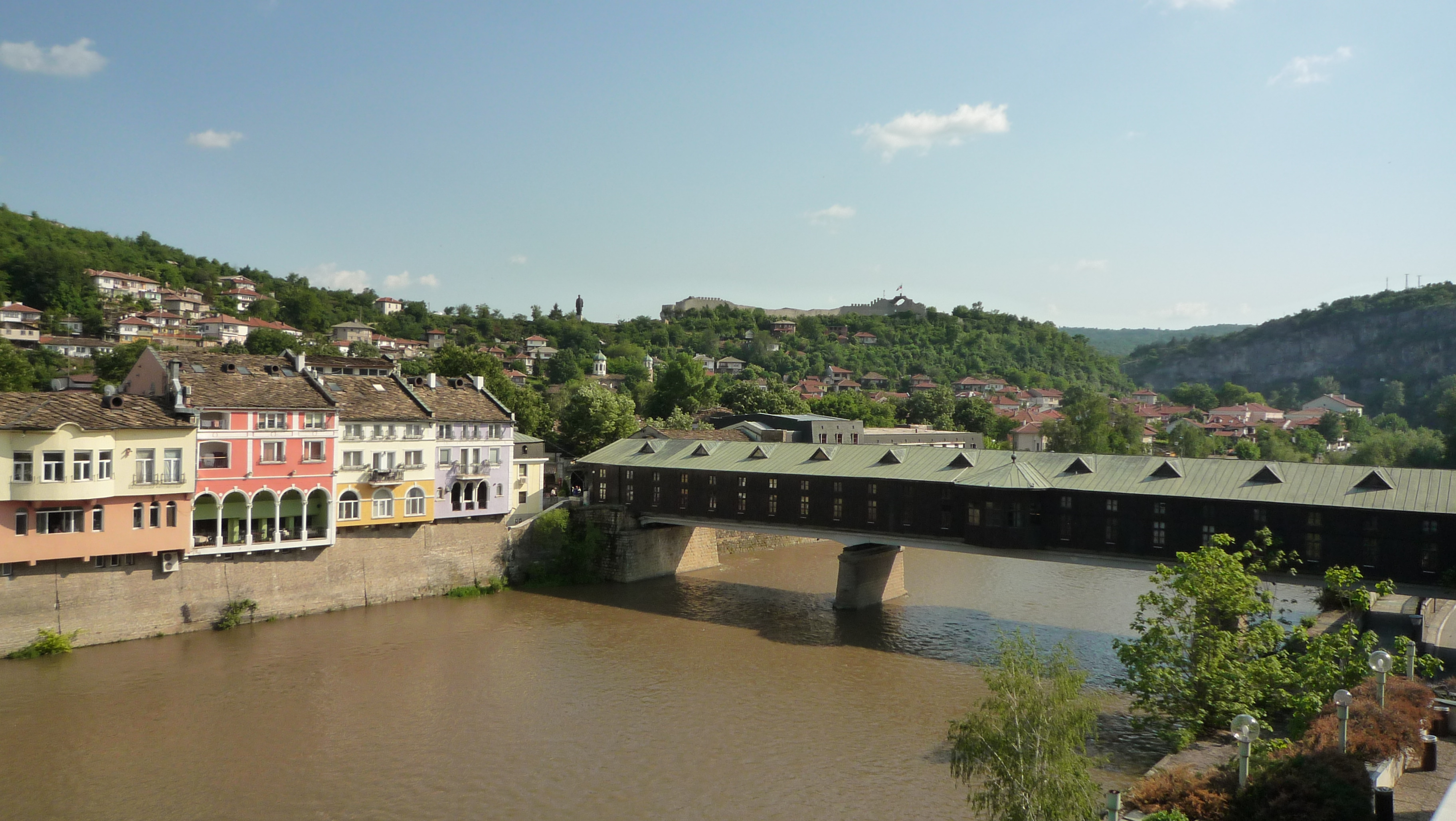
The Covered Bridge over the Osam and Lovech Fortress

The river flows in Lovech and Pleven Provinces. There are 13 settlements along its course, including ten villages and three towns. In Lovech province are Troyan (town) in Troyan Municipality, Leshnitsa, Kazachevo, Slivek, Lovech (town), Umarevtsi, Yoglav and Aleksandrovo in Lovech Municipality, and Letnitsa in Letnitsa Municipality. In Pleven Province are located Kozar Belene and Tranchovitsa in Levski Municipality, as well as Batsova Mahala, Sanadinovo and Muselievo in Nikopol Municipality. Its waters, especially in the lower course in the Danubian Plain, are utilized for irrigation. The river is the main source for potable water in the settlements within its basin, as well as for the city of Pleven. There are several small hydro power plants.

Almost the entire length of the river valley apart from its uppermost course is traversed by roads of the national network, including a 14.9 km stretch of the second class II-34 road Pleven–Nikopol, a 33.3 km section of the second class II-35 road Pleven–Lovech–Troyan–Karnare, a 55.7 km stretch of the third class III-301 road Kozar Belene–Letnitsa–Lovech, a 15.4 km stretch of the third class III-303 road Balgarene–Levski–Pavlikeni–Dryanovo, and a 24.5 km section of the third class III-304 road Balgarene–Debovo.

Along the left bank of the Osam passes a section of railway line Levski–Lovech–Troyan served by the Bulgarian State Railways.

== Landmarks ==
The upper reaches of the Osam fall within the boundaries of the Central Balkan National Park. The upper valley of the Cherni Osam and its gorge in particular are part of the Steneto Reserve. That area is known for its numerous limestone caves, including Raychova Dupka which is the second deepest cave in Bulgaria with a depth of -377 m. Along the left bank of the Cherni Osam south of the village of Oreshak is located the Troyan Monastery, among the largest and most important spiritual sites in the country.

Further downstream in Lovech, the river is crossed by the 19th century Covered Bridge and is overlooked by the Lovech Fortress, a major medieval Bulgarian stronghold. On the high right shore of the Osam near the village of Devetaki is located the Devetashka cave, one of the country's most picturesque caverns. Along its tributary the Maarata near the village of Krushuna are the Krushuna Falls, an attractive travertine cascade.

== Gallery ==
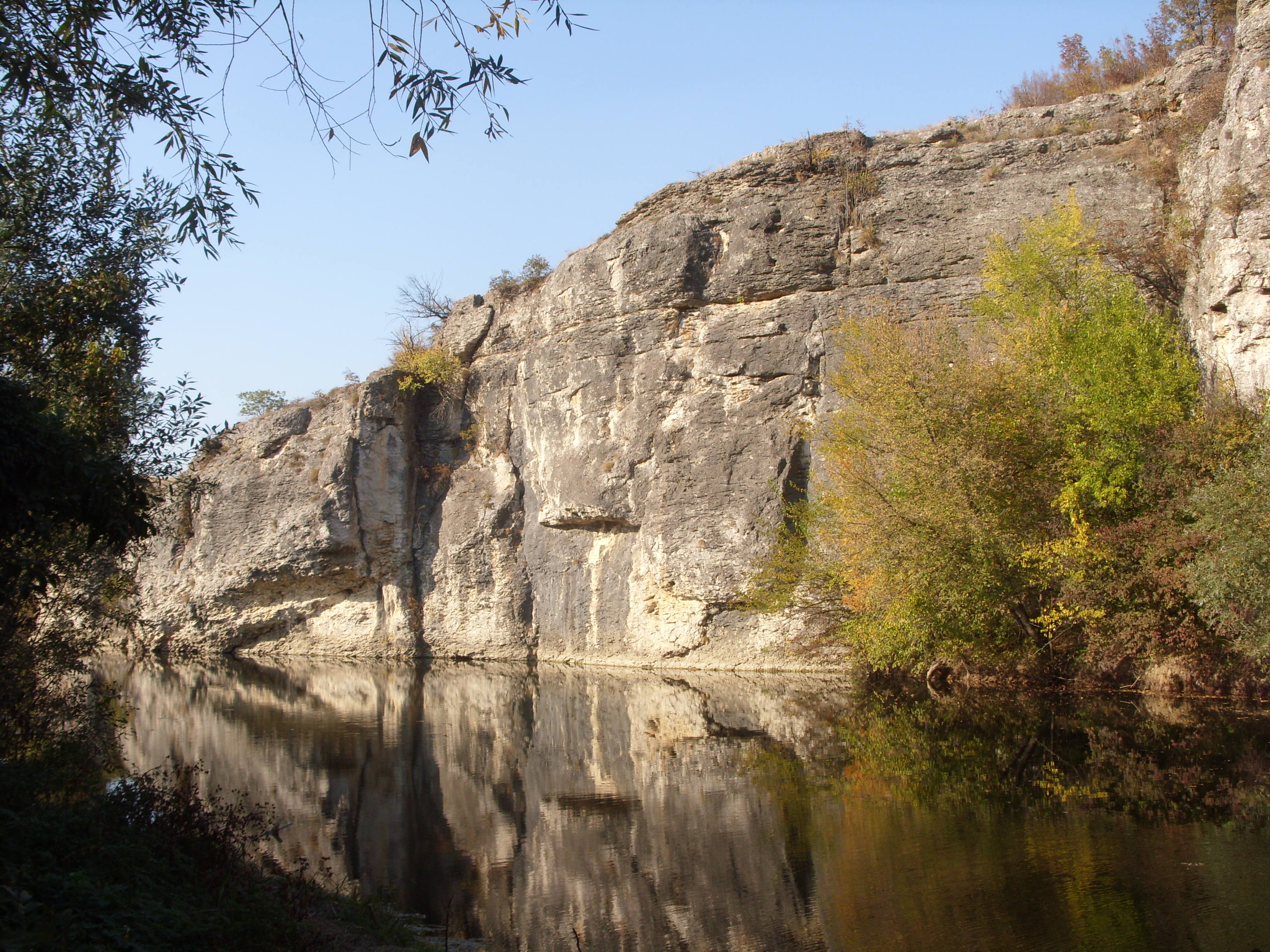
The Osam through the Devetashko Plateau

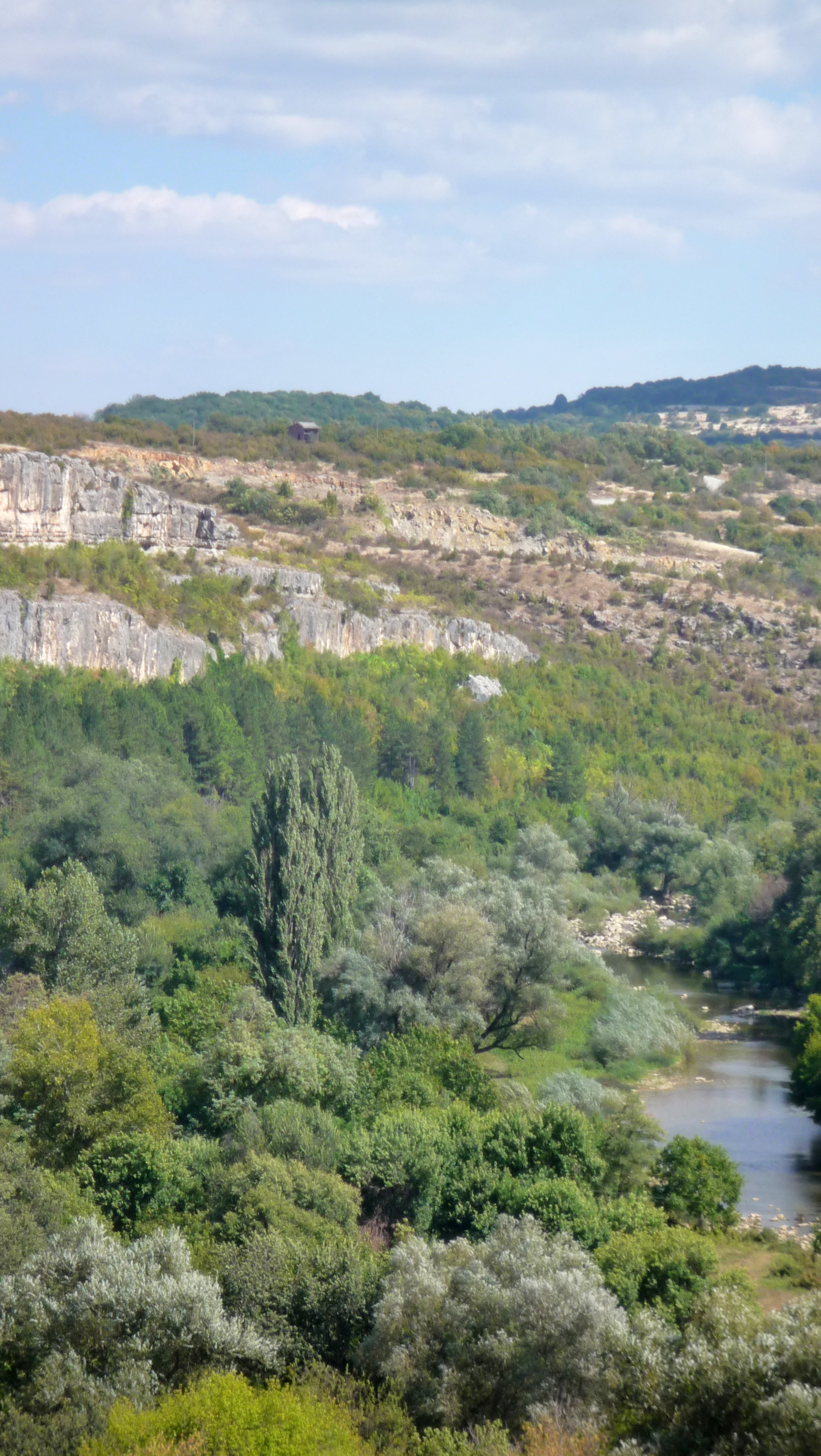
Near Lovech

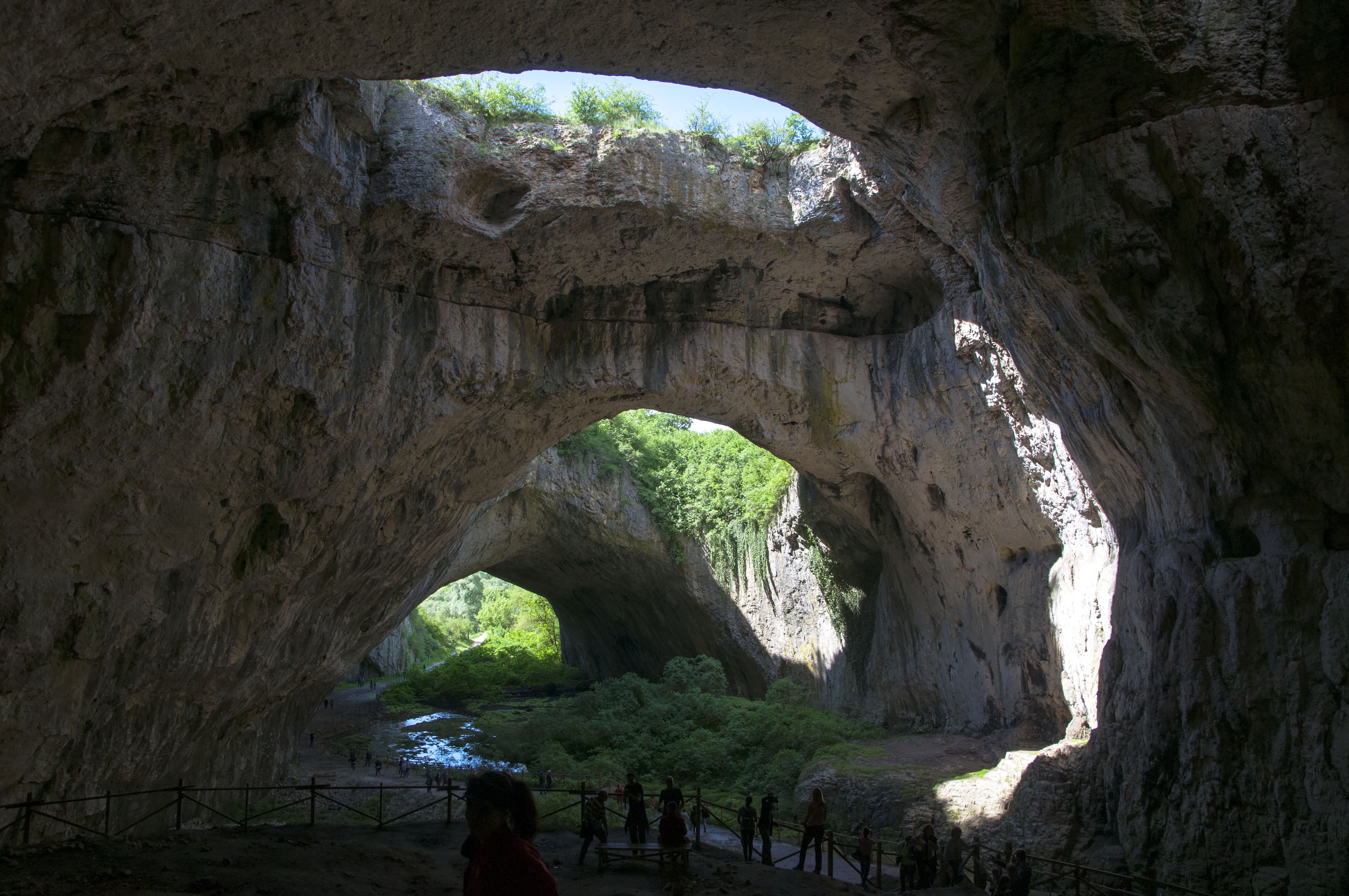
Devetashka cave near the banks of the Osam
