= Sokolovo, Lovech Province =

Village in Bulgaria

Sokolovo Соколово
- Village
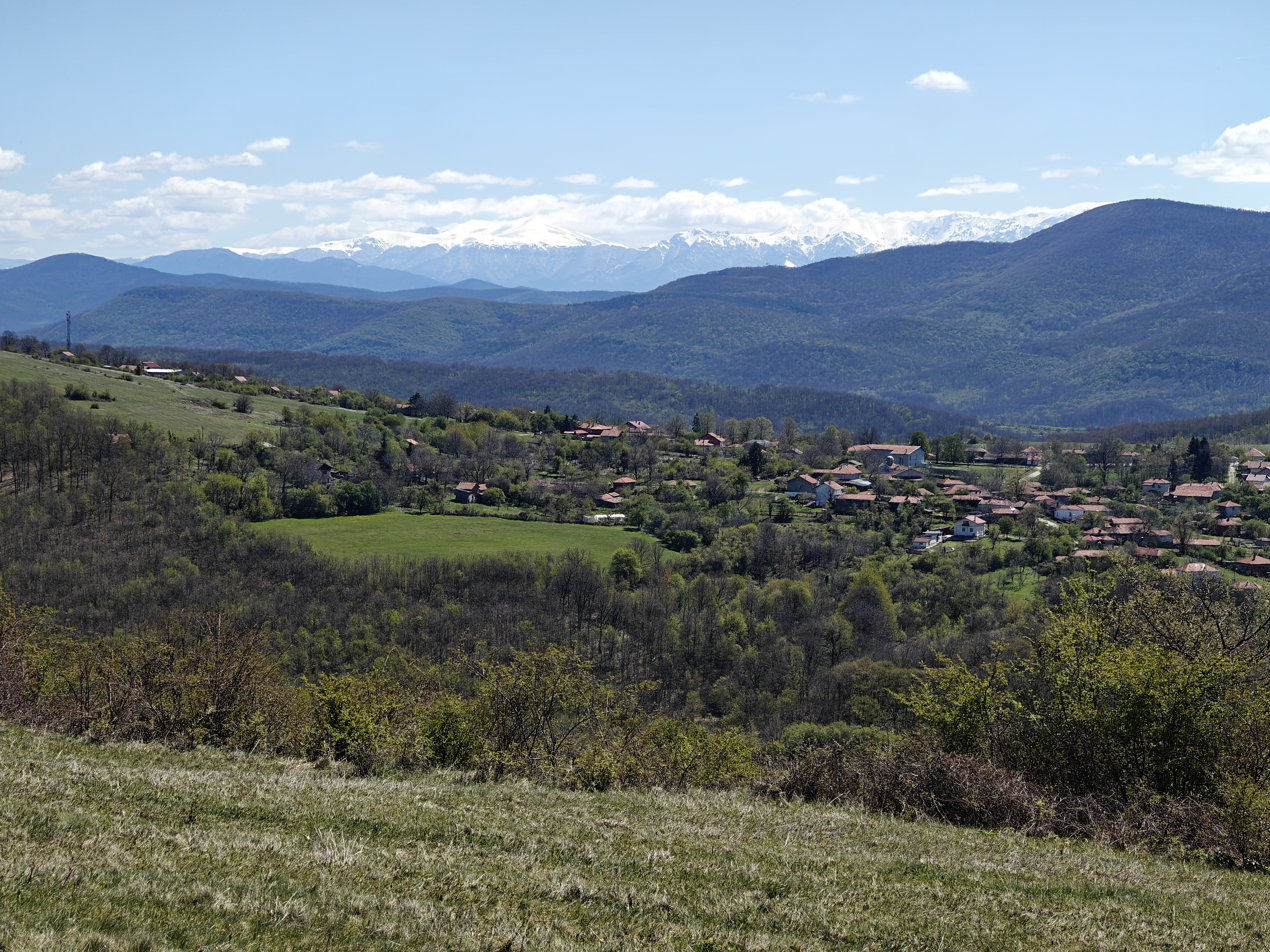
- View of Sokolovo and the central Balkan Mountains from the north

- Location within Bulgaria
- Coordinates: 43.0711°N 24.6217°E
- Country: Bulgaria
- Province: Lovech Province
- Municipality: Lovech
- Elevation: 500 m (1,600 ft)

Population (15 March 2024)
  - Total: 119
- Time zone: UTC+2 (EET)
  - Summer (DST): UTC+3 (EEST)

Sokolovo (Bulgarian: Соколово) is a village in Lovech Municipality, Lovech Province, central northern Bulgaria.

== Geography ==
Sokolovo is set among the Lovech Heights in the northern foothills of the Balkan Mountains. It lies 13 km (8.1 mi) southwest of the provincial centre Lovech and 10 km (6.2 mi) northeast of the I-4 road (European route E772) junction at Mikre.

The extensive state hunting ground Byalka covers 73.24 km^{2} (28.28 sq mi) in the forested hills immediately to the north and west of Sokolovo. Red deer, fallow deer, roe deer and wild boars roam the hunting grounds. In the 20th century, Bulgarian communist leader Todor Zhivkov regularly visited Byalka for hare hunting, joined by famous writers and Politburo members.

The minor Tosha River, a right tributary of the Vit's largest tributary the Kamenitsa, flows through Sokolovo. It has its source in Byalka and then flows north-northwest to Radyuvene and Katunets, joining the Kamenitsa at Bezhanovo.

According to the 2011 Bulgarian census, Sokolovo had a population of 121: 113 were ethnic Bulgarians, 6 were ethnic Turks, and 2 did not respond.

== History and culture ==
Sokolovo was founded in the 19th century by four extended families that migrated from Macedonia. A ruined Ottoman fortification previously stood at the site. Until 1934, the village was called Şahinkaya (Шахън кая, Turkish for "falcon rock"); the modern Bulgarian name is a partial calque meaning "falcon place".

=== Church ===
The Bulgarian Orthodox Church of the Annunciation of the Mother of God was consecrated in 2021. The church holiday (Feast of the Annunciation) is celebrated annually on 25 March. Donors from the region funded the church's construction, which took around 10 years.
