= Malinovo, Lovech Province =

Malinovo Малиново
- Village
- Location within Bulgaria
- Coordinates: 42.9000°N 24.9000°E
- Country: Bulgaria
- Province: Lovech Province
- Municipality: Lovech

Population (February 2011 (census))
  - Total: ▼715
- Time zone: UTC+2 (EET)
  - Summer (DST): UTC+3 (EEST)

Malinovo is a village in Lovech Municipality, Lovech Province, northern Bulgaria.

The village of Malinovo has a Turkish majority. It is one of the few places in the province of Lovech with a Turkish majority. There is also a large Turkish minority living in the nearby village of Aleksandrovo.
