= Rene Karabash =

Bulgarian writer and actor (born 1989)

Rene Karabash Рене Карабаш
- Rene Karabash in 2025
- Born: 1989 (age 36–37); Aleksandrovo, Lovech Municipality, Bulgaria
- Education: Université Catholique de l’Ouest Angers; St. Cyril and Methodius University of Veliko Tarnovo; New Bulgarian University
- Occupations: poet, writer, scriptwriter
- Writing career
- Notable work: She Who Remains

Irena Hristova Ivanova (Note: In this Bulgarian name, the patronymic is Hristova and the family name is Ivanova.) (Bulgarian: Ирена Христова Иванова), better known by the pen name Rene Karabash (Рене Карабаш), is a Bulgarian writer and actor. Her work has been nominated for and received several Bulgarian literary awards. In 2026, her novel, She Who Remains, was shortlisted for the International Booker Prize.

== Life and career ==
Irena Hristova Ivanova was born in 1989 in the village of Aleksandrovo, in the Lovech Municipality. She attended school in Lovech, and received her bachelor's degree in French and English applied linguistics at the Veliko Tarnovo University. She studied literature at the Catholic University of the West in Angers, and received her master's degree in film direction from the New Bulgarian University. Her pen name combines her mother's maiden name and "Renée", a nickname she acquired in France.

She performed the role of Gana in the film Godless, which was presented at the Locarno Film Festival. For her performance, she won Best Actress. She also won the award for Best Actress at the Stockholm Film Festival, the Heart of Sarajevo, and the Golden Rose.

In 2021, Karabash published a short collection of epistolary fiction, Omar's Letters to his Future Wife, containing letters sent by the titular Omar to his future wife. She has also published poetry. She is the founder of The Rabbit Hole, a creative writing academy in Bulgaria, which has employed writers such as Georgi Gospodinov, Georgi Bardarov, and Victoria Beshliiska.

== She Who Remains ==
In 2018, Karabash released her debut novel, She Who Remains (Bulgarian: Остайница, romanized: Ostaynitsa), about a sworn virgin in Albania. Regarding the work, Karabash said that she wanted to write about the violence of patriarchal society. She spent two years researching the book. Her main sources were books, including Broken April by Ismail Kadare, and interviews with sworn virgins. She said that although she did not travel to Albania, her realistic portrayal persuaded Albanian specialists at Sofia University that she had visited the country.

As of 2026, the novel has been translated into 15 languages. The English translation by Izidora Angel was published by Peirene Press in 2026 and was shortlisted for the 2026 International Booker Prize. Angel won the 2023 Gulf Coast Translation Prize for her work on She Who Remains. She described the novel as both "structurally innovative" and "thematically astonishing", remarking that Bulgarian literature rarely deals with queer themes. During the novel's presentation at the Apolonia Festival, one moderator referred to it as "the first serious queer novel in Bulgaria".

== Works ==
- Хлъбоци и пеперуди (Hips and Butterflies) - 2014
- Остайница (She Who Remains) - 2018
- Братовчедката на Зорбас (Zorbas' Cousin) - 2020
- Писма на Омар до бъдещата му съпруга (Omar's letters to His Future Wife) - 2021
- Някой ме вика по име (Someone Сalls Me by Name) - 2026

== Honors ==
- Nominated for the Ivan Nikolov Prize for Hips and Butterflies, 2015
- Awarded the Elias Canetti Prize for She Who Remains, 2019
- Awarded the PEN Club français Prize for Translation for She Who Remains, 2023
- Shortlisted for the International Booker Prize for She Who Remains, 2026
