= Goran (village) =

Goran Горан
- Village
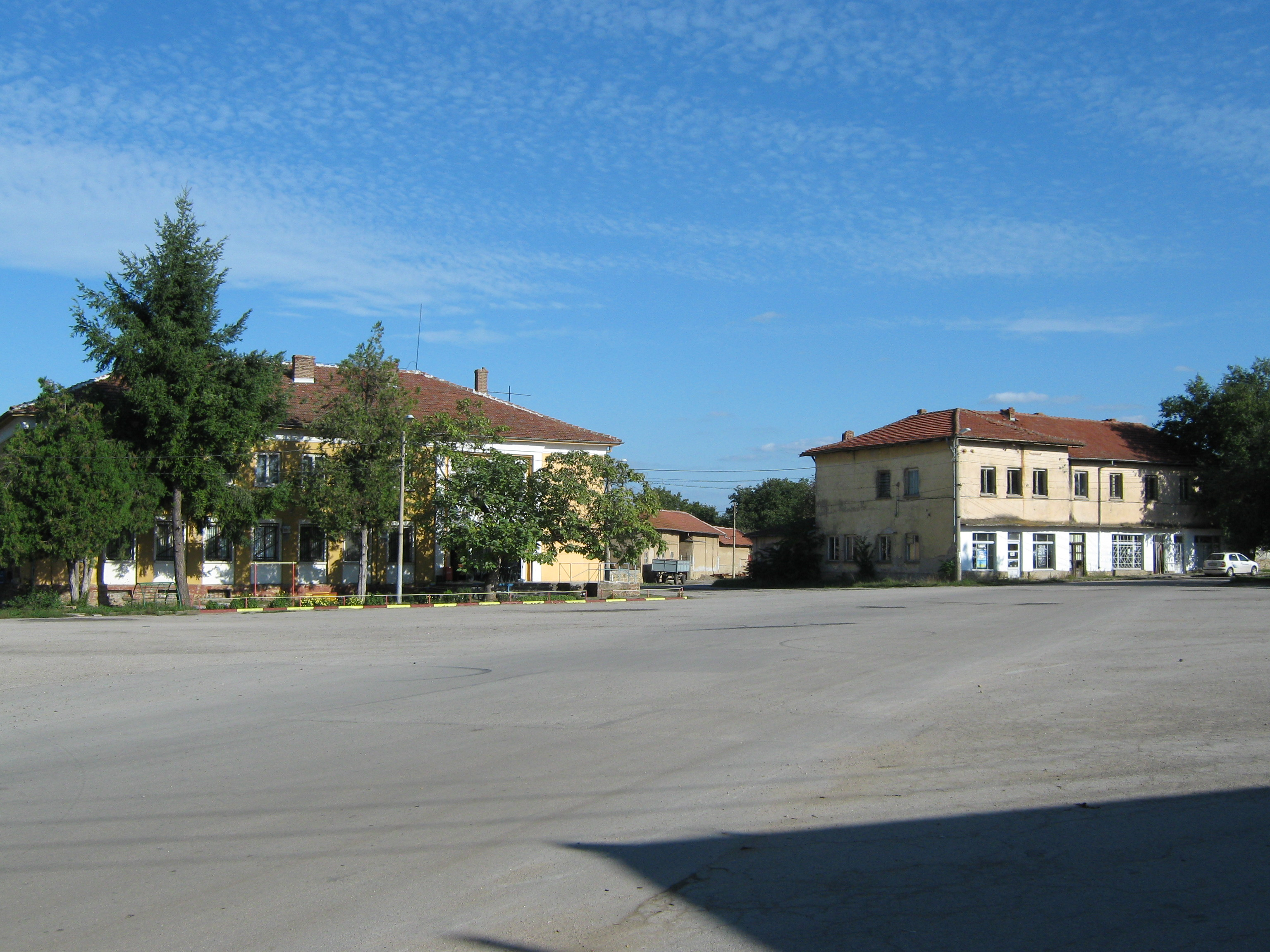
- Village centre

- Location within Bulgaria
- Coordinates: 43.2000°N 24.7333°E
- Country: Bulgaria
- Province: Lovech Province
- Municipality: Lovech
- Time zone: UTC+2 (EET)
  - Summer (DST): UTC+3 (EEST)

Goran is a village in Lovech Municipality, Lovech Province, northern Bulgaria.
