= Drenov =

Drenov Дренов
- Village
- Location within Bulgaria
- Coordinates: 43.2833°N 24.8500°E
- Country: Bulgaria
- Province: Lovech Province
- Municipality: Lovech
- Time zone: UTC+2 (EET)
  - Summer (DST): UTC+3 (EEST)

Drenov is a village in Lovech Municipality, Lovech Province, northern Bulgaria.
