= Ablanitsa =

Ablanitsa refers to the following places in Bulgaria:

- Ablanitsa, Blagoevgrad Province
- Ablanitsa, Lovech Province
- Ablanitsa, Pazardzhik Province
- Ablanitsa, Plovdiv Province
