= Doyrentsi =

Doyrentsi Дойренци
- Village
- Location within Bulgaria
- Coordinates: 43.2333°N 24.8333°E
- Country: Bulgaria
- Province: Lovech Province
- Municipality: Lovech
- Time zone: UTC+2 (EET)
  - Summer (DST): UTC+3 (EEST)

Doyrentsi is a village in Lovech Municipality, Lovech Province in northern Bulgaria. In 2013, the population was 1090.
