= Slavyani =

Slavyani Славяни
- Village
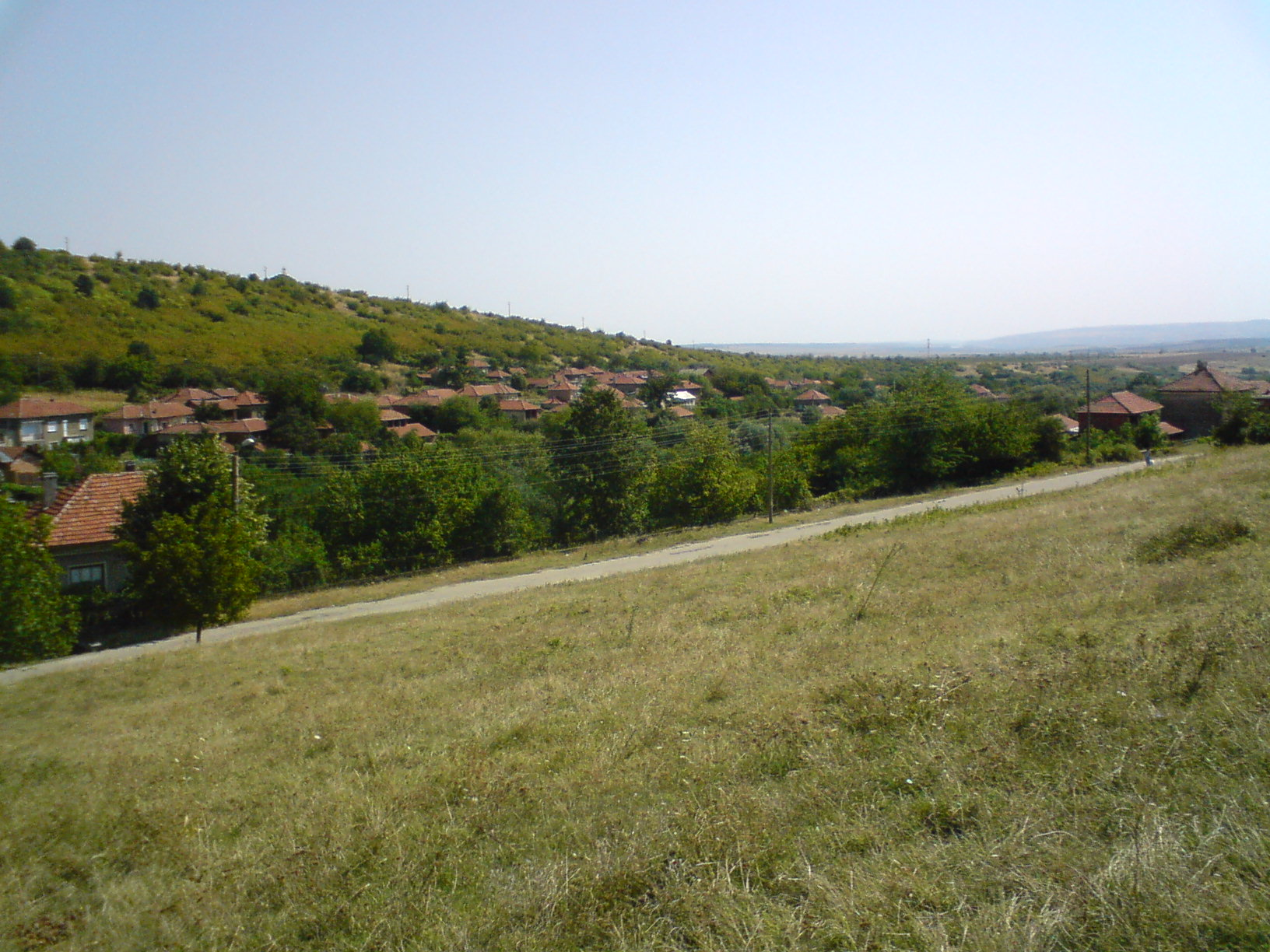
- A part of village Slavyani, which is near by Lovech, Bulgaria

- Location within Bulgaria
- Coordinates: 43.2167°N 24.6667°E
- Country: Bulgaria
- Province: Lovech Province
- Municipality: Lovech
- Time zone: UTC+2 (EET)
  - Summer (DST): UTC+3 (EEST)

Slavyani is a village in Lovech Municipality, Lovech Province, northern Bulgaria.
