= Smochan =

Smochan Смочан
- Village
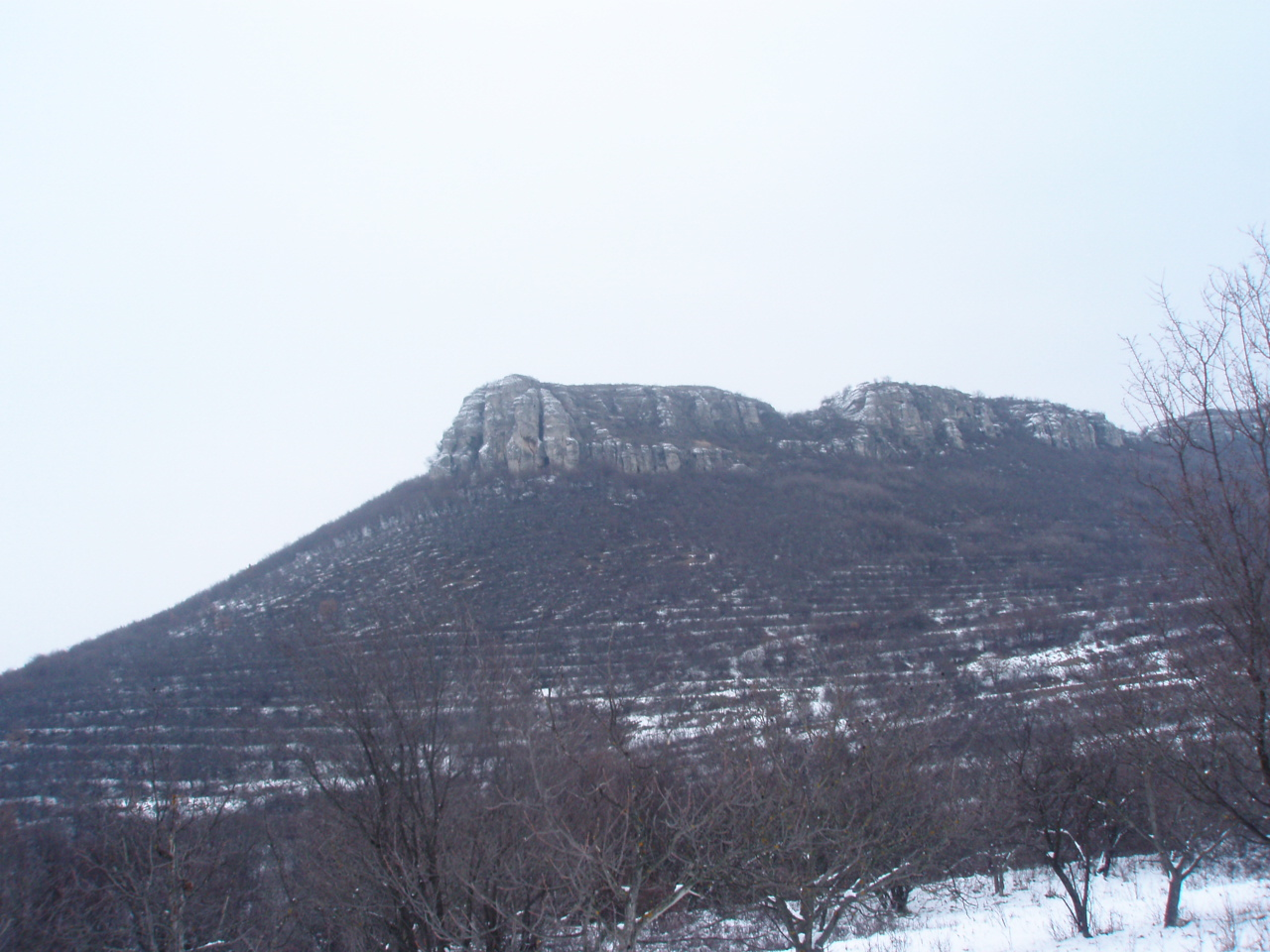
- Part of the area "Big Stone" Smochan-Lovech region. This type of rocks and hills predominate in this area characterized by its hilly-mountainous relief-typical of the Balkans

- Location within Bulgaria
- Coordinates: 43.1833°N 24.8000°E
- Country: Bulgaria
- Province: Lovech Province
- Municipality: Lovech
- Time zone: UTC+2 (EET)
  - Summer (DST): UTC+3 (EEST)

Smochan is a village in Lovech Municipality, Lovech Province, northern Bulgaria.
