= Levski Peak =

Levski Peak can refer to:

- Levski Peak (Bulgaria), in the Balkan Mountains, in central Bulgaria
- Levski Peak (Antarctica), in the Tangra Mountains, in Livingston Island, Antarctica
