= Stefanovo, Lovech Province =

Stefanovo Стефаново
- Village
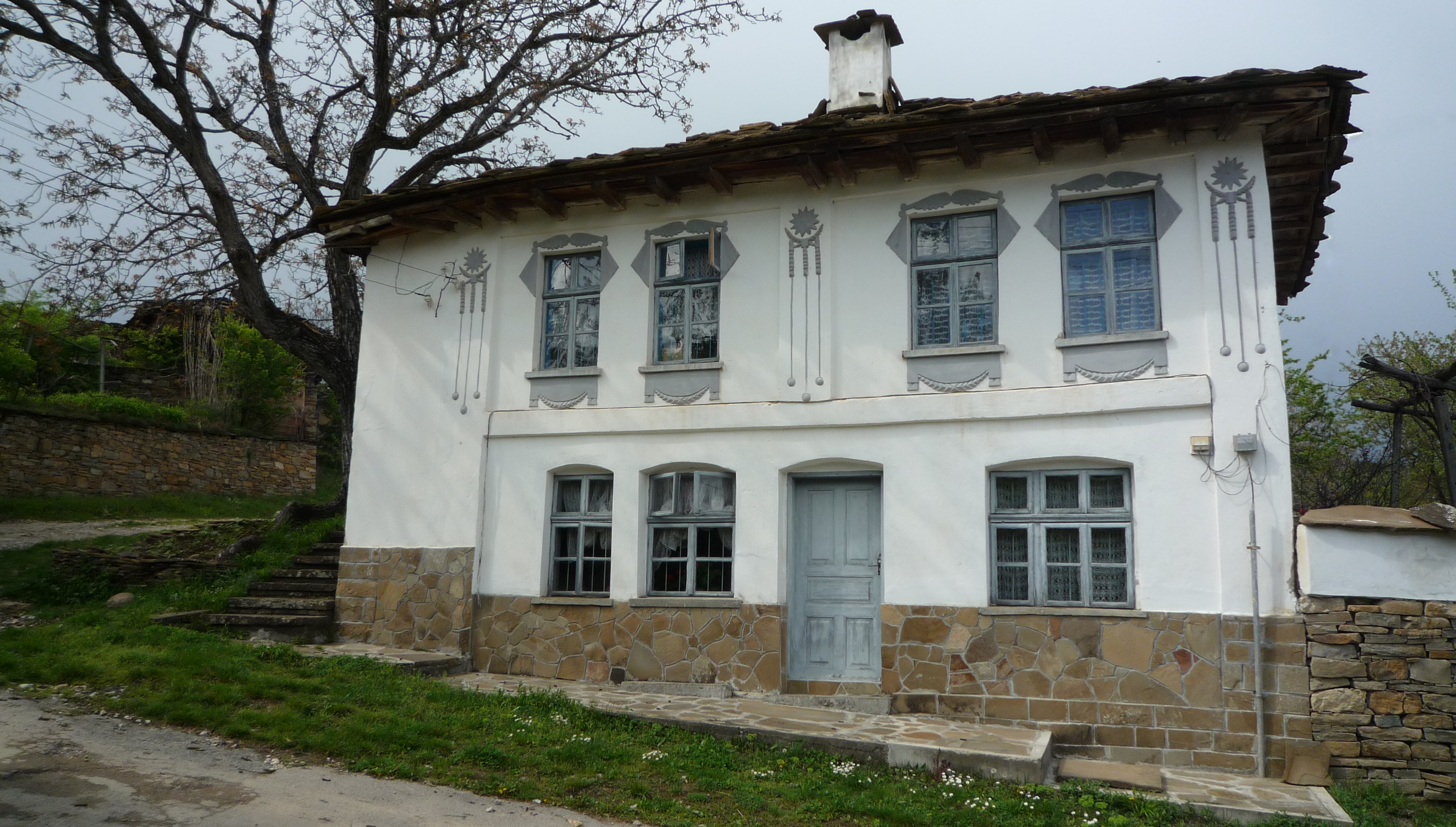
- Manor in Stefanovo, Bulgaria

- Location within Bulgaria
- Coordinates: 43.0167°N 24.8167°E
- Country: Bulgaria
- Province: Lovech Province
- Municipality: Lovech
- Time zone: UTC+2 (EET)
  - Summer (DST): UTC+3 (EEST)

Stefanovo is a village in Lovech Municipality, Lovech Province, northern Bulgaria.

Staro Stefanovo Architectural Reserve

In 1935, the village of Stefanovo was divided into two sections. The older settlement, known as Staro Stefanovo, was designated an architectural reserve by Decree No. 40 of the Council of Ministers on October 27, 1982. This status was officially published in the Official Journal (Issue 20, March 11, 1983), recognizing 96 distinct cultural monuments within the area.

Architectural Significance

Of the preserved structures in the village, 95 are classified as architectural and construction monuments:

- 35 buildings hold the status of local significance.
- 60 buildings are recognized as part of an architectural ensemble.

Church of the Nativity of the Blessed Virgin

A key landmark of the reserve is the (Bulgarian: Рождество Пресвета Богородица).

- Construction: Built by the renowned master Usta Gencho Kanev from Tryavna. Kanev was a highly prolific master builder responsible for numerous churches and public buildings throughout Bulgaria during the National Revival period.
- Timeline: Construction was completed in 1882. The iconostasis was finalized in 1887, featuring icons commissioned by local donors (ktitors).
- Artistry: The temple was painted by Rusalim Dichov, a representative of the Debar Artistic School from the village of Tresonche. Decorative Wall Paintings (Alafranga) Following his work on the church, Rusalim Dichov applied decorative mural paintings in the alafranga style (Bulgarian: а ла франга) to several residential houses in the village, then known as Vrattsa.
  - Current State: Today, approximately ten houses retain their decorative wall ornamentation, either partially or fully preserved.
