= Dabrava, Lovech Province =

Dabrava Дъбрава
- Village
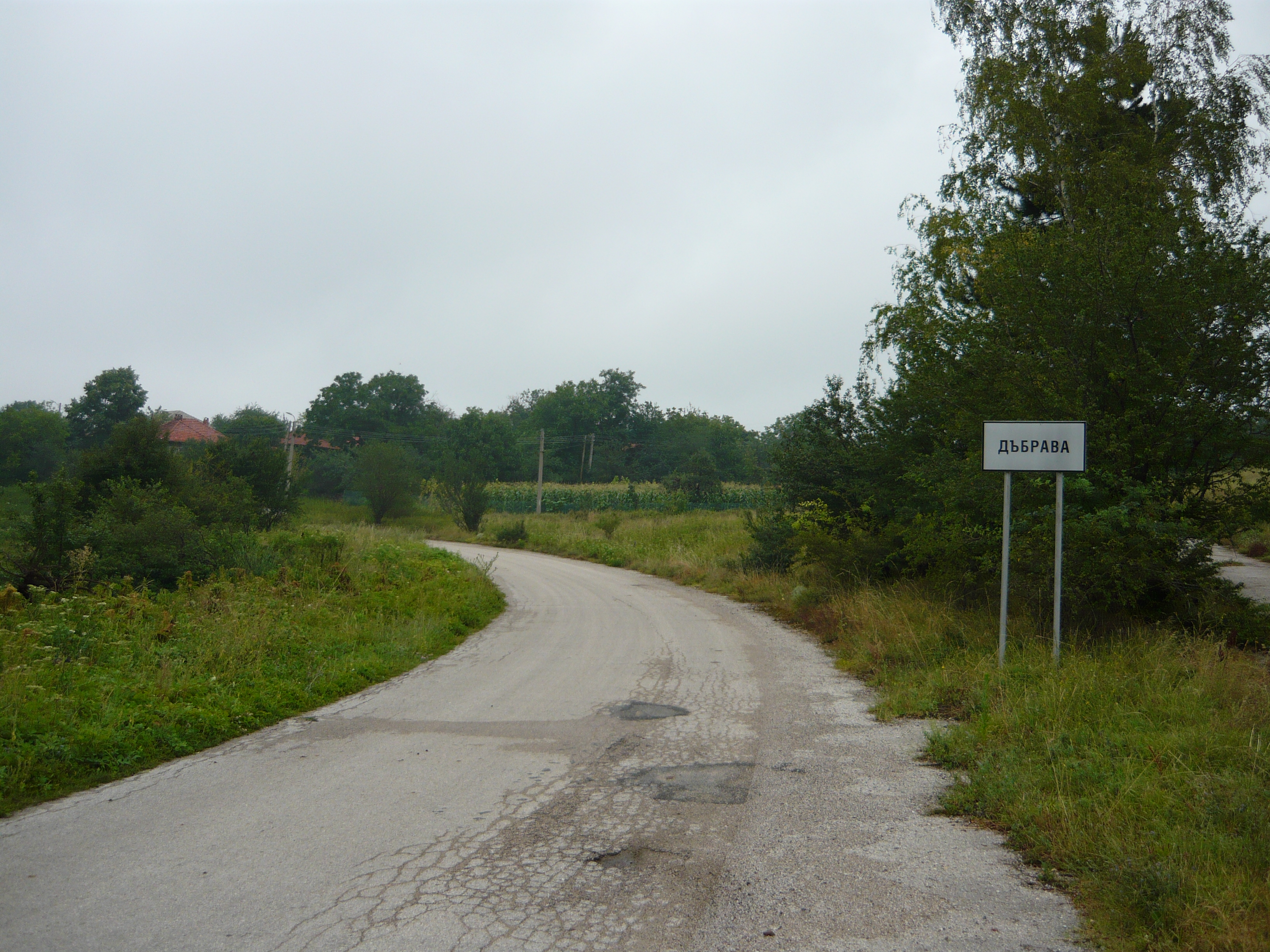
- Road sign leading to the village

- Location within Bulgaria
- Coordinates: 43.0667°N 24.8167°Ev
- Country: Bulgaria
- Province: Lovech Province
- Municipality: Lovech
- Time zone: UTC+2 (EET)
  - Summer (DST): UTC+3 (EEST)

Dabrava is a village in Lovech Municipality, Lovech Province, northern Bulgaria.

Dabrava Glacier on Graham Land, Antarctica is named after the village.
