= Presyaka =

Presyaka Пресяка
- Village
- Location within Bulgaria
- Coordinates: 43.1500°N 24.7667°E
- Country: Bulgaria
- Province: Lovech Province
- Municipality: Lovech
- Time zone: UTC+2 (EET)
  - Summer (DST): UTC+3 (EEST)

Presyaka is a village in Lovech Municipality, Lovech Province, northern Bulgaria.
