= Chavdartsi =

Chavdartsi refers to the following places in Bulgaria:

- Chavdartsi, Lovech Province
- Chavdartsi, Veliko Tarnovo Province

== See also ==
- Chavdar (disambiguation)
