= Devetaki =

Devetaki Деветаки
- Village
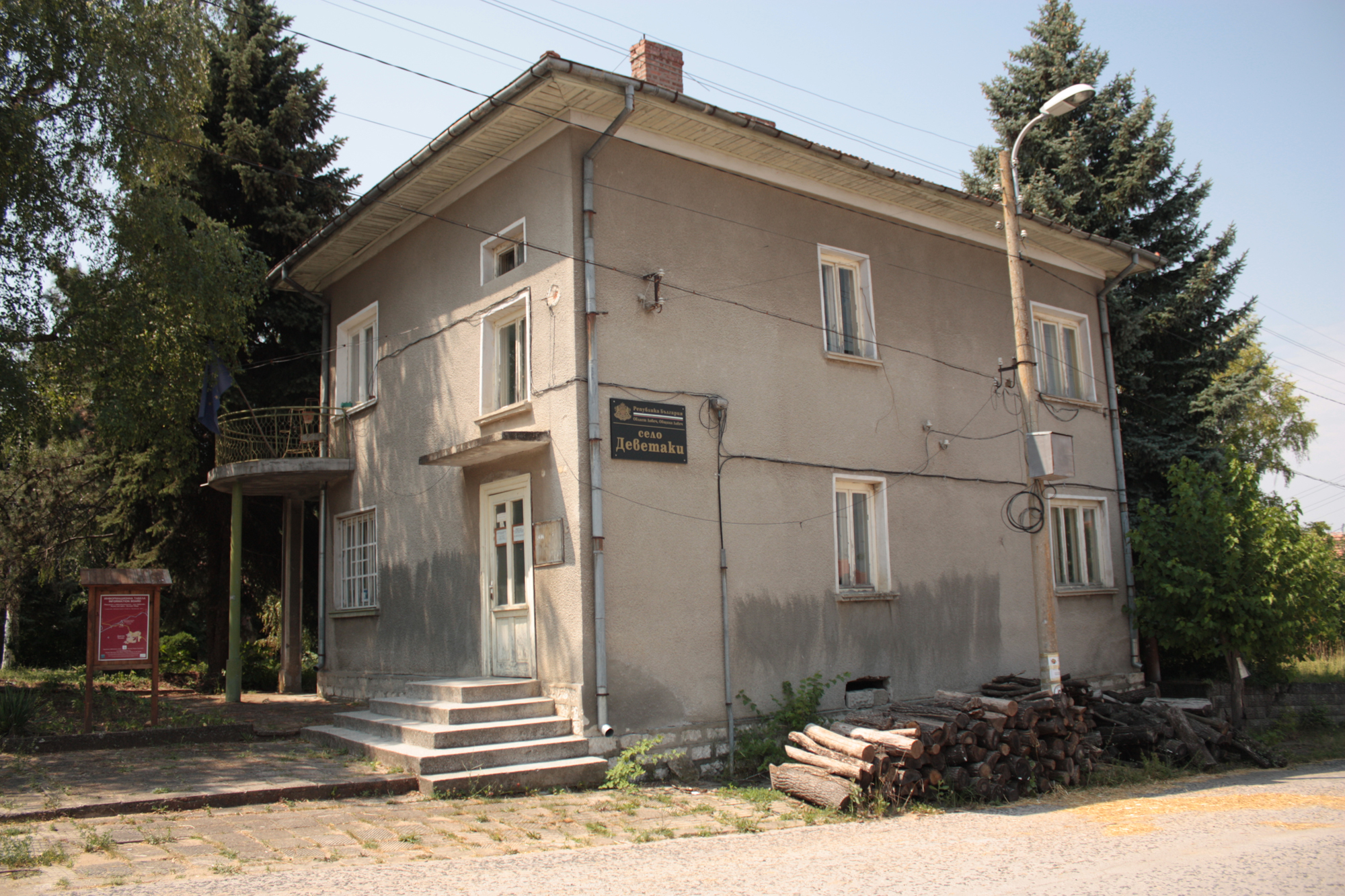
- Municipal office

- Location within Bulgaria
- Coordinates: 43.2167°N 24.9000°E
- Country: Bulgaria
- Province: Lovech Province
- Municipality: Lovech
- Time zone: UTC+2 (EET)
  - Summer (DST): UTC+3 (EEST)

Devetaki is a village in Lovech Municipality, Lovech Province, northern Bulgaria. It is near to Devetàshka cave, an archaeological site, park, and tourist attraction.
