= Slivek =

Slivek Сливек
- Village
- Location within Bulgaria
- Coordinates: 43.1000°N 24.7500°E
- Country: Bulgaria
- Province: Lovech Province
- Municipality: Lovech
- Time zone: UTC+2 (EET)
  - Summer (DST): UTC+3 (EEST)

Slivek is a village in Lovech Municipality, Lovech Province, northern Bulgaria.
