= Radyuvene =

Radyuvene Радювене
- Village
- Location within Bulgaria
- Coordinates: 43.1233°N 24.6053°E
- Country: Bulgaria
- Province: Lovech Province
- Municipality: Lovech
- Time zone: UTC+2 (EET)
  - Summer (DST): UTC+3 (EEST)

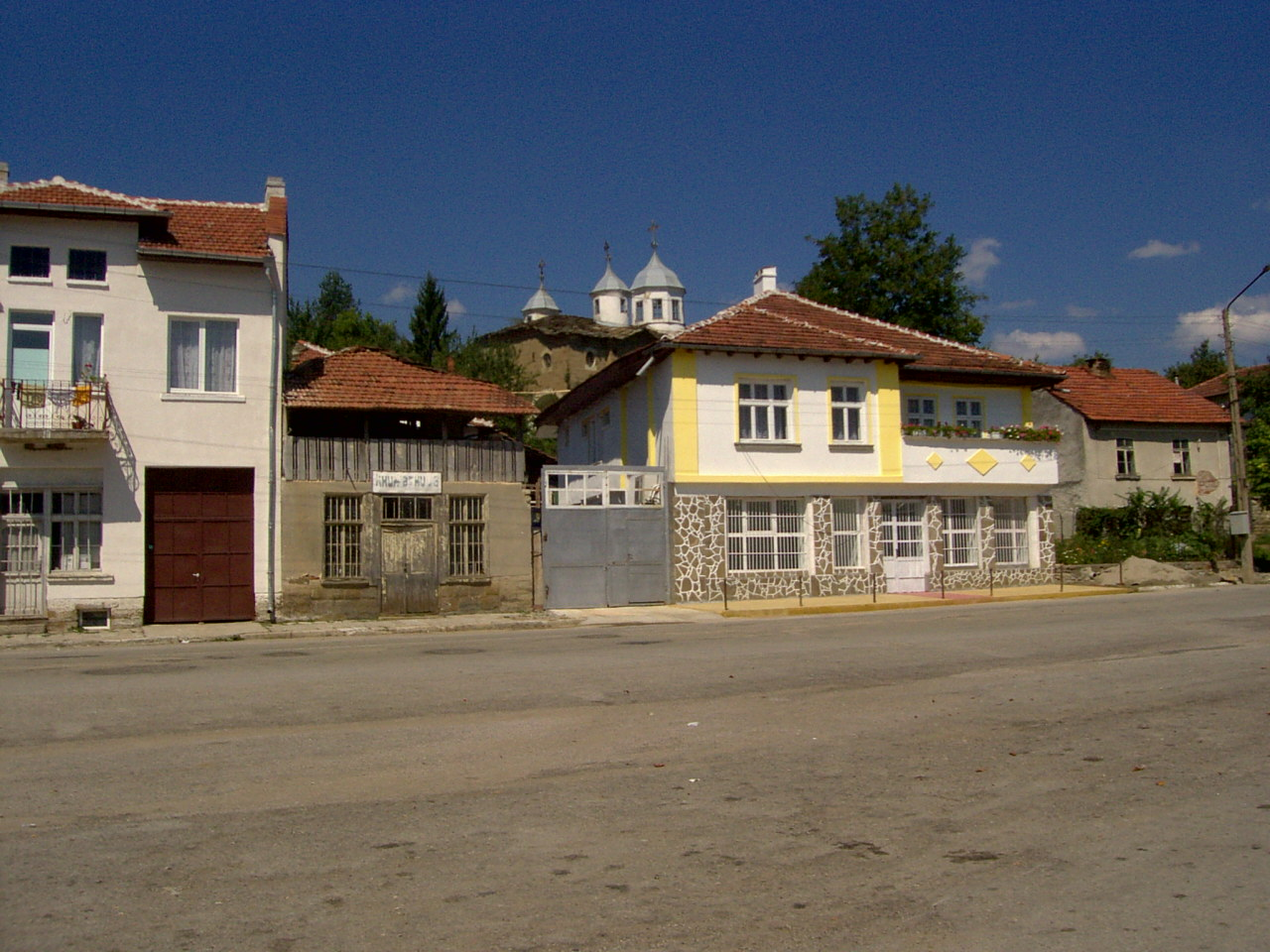

Radyuvene is a village in Lovech Municipality, Lovech Province, northern Bulgaria.
