= Ablanitsa, Lovech Province =

Coordinates: 43.0167°N 24.6833°E

Ablanitsa Абланица Ablanica, Ablanitza
- Village
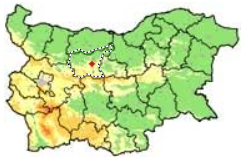

- Location within Bulgaria
- Country: Bulgaria
- Province: Lovech Province
- Municipality: Lovech
- Founded in: 1479

Area
  - Total: 23.610 km^{2} (9.116 sq mi)

Population
  - Total: 141
- Time zone: UTC+2 (EET)
  - Summer (DST): UTC+3 (EEST)
- Postal code: 5574
- Area code: 06921

Ablanitsa is a village in Lovech Municipality, Lovech Province, in the north-western region of Bulgaria, situated right at the foot of the mountain Stara Planina and is home to Saint Demetrius Orthodox Church, as well as an abundance of caves.
