= Yoglav =

Yoglav Йоглав
- Village
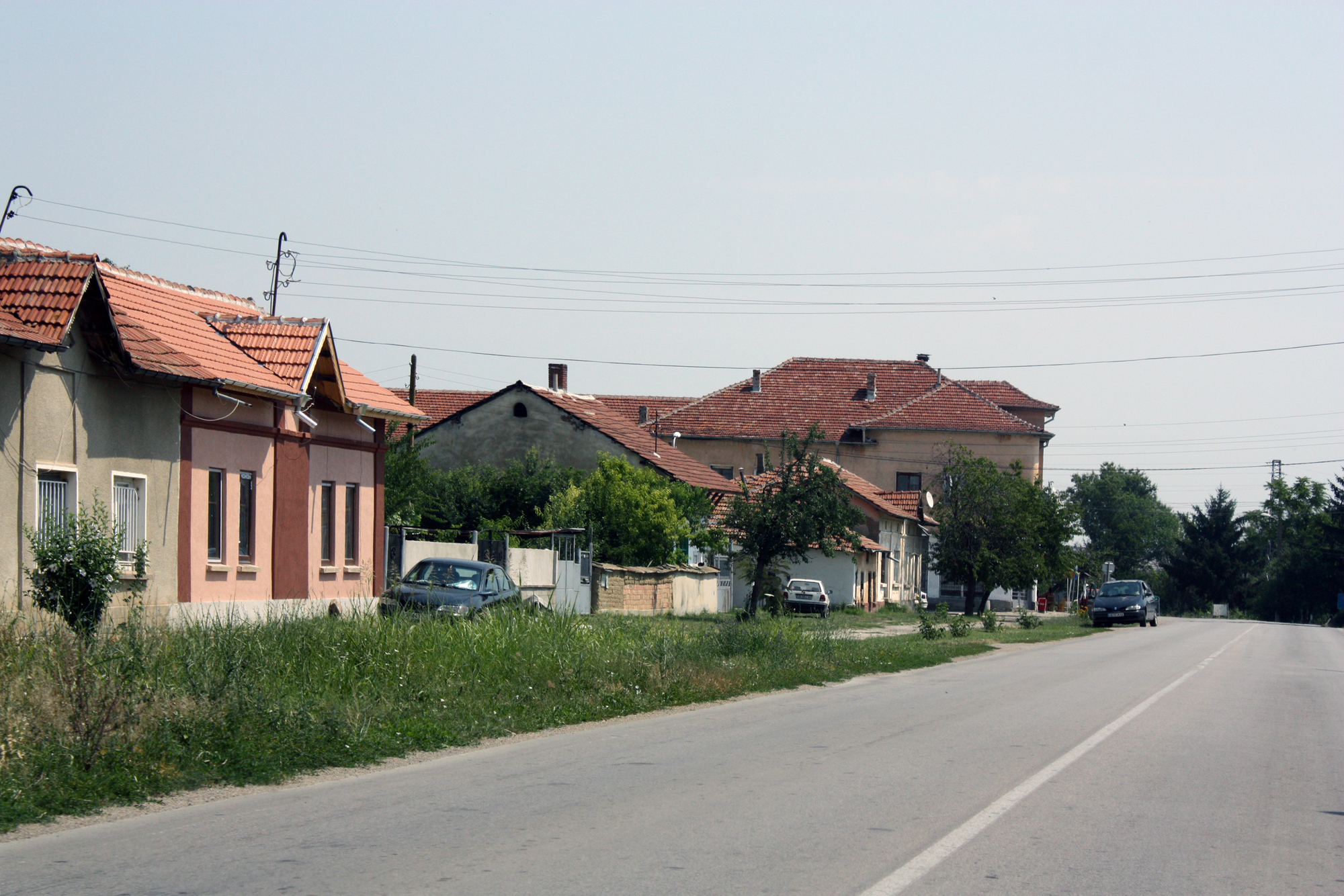

- Location within Bulgaria
- Coordinates: 43.2000°N 24.8167°E
- Country: Bulgaria
- Province: Lovech Province
- Municipality: Lovech
- Time zone: UTC+2 (EET)
  - Summer (DST): UTC+3 (EEST)

Yoglav (Bulgarian: Йоглав [ˈjɔɡɫɐf]) is a village in Lovech Municipality, Lovech Province, northern Bulgaria.
