= Godless (2016 film) =

2016 Bulgarian drama film

- Film poster
- Bulgarian: Безбог
- Directed by: Ralitza Petrova
- Written by: Ralitza Petrova
- Produced by: Rossitsa Valkanova
- Starring: Irena Ivanova; Ivan Nalbantov
- Cinematography: Krum Rodriguez; Chayse Irvin
- Edited by: Donka Ivanova; Ralitza Petrova
- Production companies: KLAS Film; Snowglobe; Alcatraz Films; Film Factory; Aporia Filmworks
- Distributed by: Heretic Outreach
- Release date: 11 August 2016 (Locarno)
- Running time: 95 minutes; 99 minutes
- Countries: Bulgaria; Denmark; France
- Language: Bulgarian

Godless (Bulgarian: Безбог, romanized: Bezbog) is a 2016 Bulgarian drama film directed by Ralitza Petrova. It was screened in the Discovery section at the 2016 Toronto International Film Festival.

== Cast ==
- Irena Ivanova as Gana
- Ventzislav Konstantinov as Aleko
- Ivan Nalbantov as Yoan
- Dimitar Petkov as The Judge
- Alexandr Triffonov as Pavel

== Accolades and awards ==
Godless won the prestigious Golden Leopard at the 2016 Locarno International Film Festival; Irena Ivanova also won the best actress award at Locarno for the film.

At the Sarajevo Film Festival in August 2016, Godless won the Special Jury Prize (an award of 10,000 €) and Ivanova won the Heart of Sarajevo for Best Actress (an award of 2.500 €).

At the 2016 Golden Rose National Film Festival in Varna, Godless won the top prize—the Golden Rose Award—as well as the prizes for best director (Petrova), best actress (Ivanova) and best actor (Nalbantov); Krum Rodriguez was awarded the prize for best cinematography for both Godless and Glory.

At the Reykjavík International Film Festival in September–October 2016, Godless won the top prize (the Golden Puffin). At the 2016 Warsaw Film Festival, Godless won the FIPRESCI Award for Best Debut from Eastern Europe. At the 2016 Mumbai Film Festival, Godless won the Silver Gateway award (at the international competition).
