= Chavdar =

Chavdar may refer to:

== Places ==
- Chavdar Municipality, Sofia Province, Bulgaria
- Chavdar, Sofia Province, a village in Bulgaria
- Chavdar, Smolyan Province, a village in Bulgaria
- Chavdar Peninsula, Antarctica

== People ==
- Chavdar Atanasov (born 1973), Bulgarian footballer
- Chavdar Djurov (1946–1972), Bulgarian pilot and skydiver
- Čavdar Mutafov (1899–1954), Bulgarian architect and writer
- Chavdar Tsvetkov (born 1953), Bulgarian footballer
- Chavdar Voyvoda, 16th-century Bulgarian rebel leader
- Chavdar Yankov (born 1984), Bulgarian footballer
- Tchavdar Georgiev is a writer, US producer, director and editor of films

== Other uses ==
- Chavdar (company), a Bulgarian coachbuilder
- Chavdar (tribe), Tatar tribe in medieval Anatolia
- Chavdar Partisan Brigade, a Bulgarian partisan group of World War II
- PFC Chavdar Byala Slatina, a Bulgarian football club
- PFC Chavdar Etropole, a Bulgarian football club

== See also ==
- Chavdartsi (disambiguation)
