= Chavdartsi, Lovech Province =

Chavdartsi Чавдарци
- Village
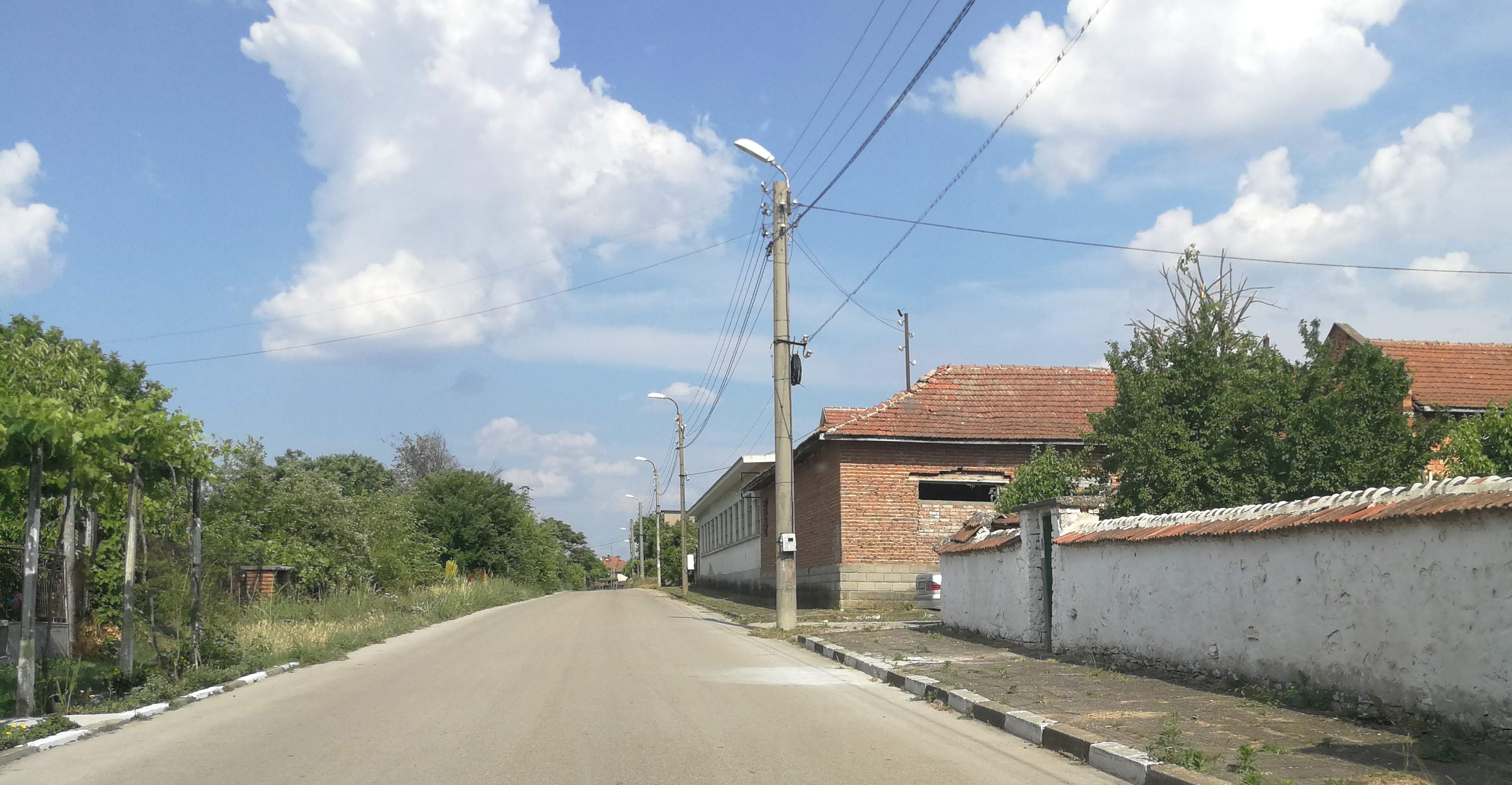
- Roadside house in Chavdartsi

- Location within Bulgaria
- Coordinates: 43.2500°N 25.0000°E
- Country: Bulgaria
- Province: Lovech Province
- Municipality: Lovech
- Time zone: UTC+2 (EET)
  - Summer (DST): UTC+3 (EEST)

Chavdartsi is a village in Lovech Municipality, Lovech Province, northern Bulgaria.
