= Levski Peak (Bulgaria) =

Mountain in Bulgaria

Levski
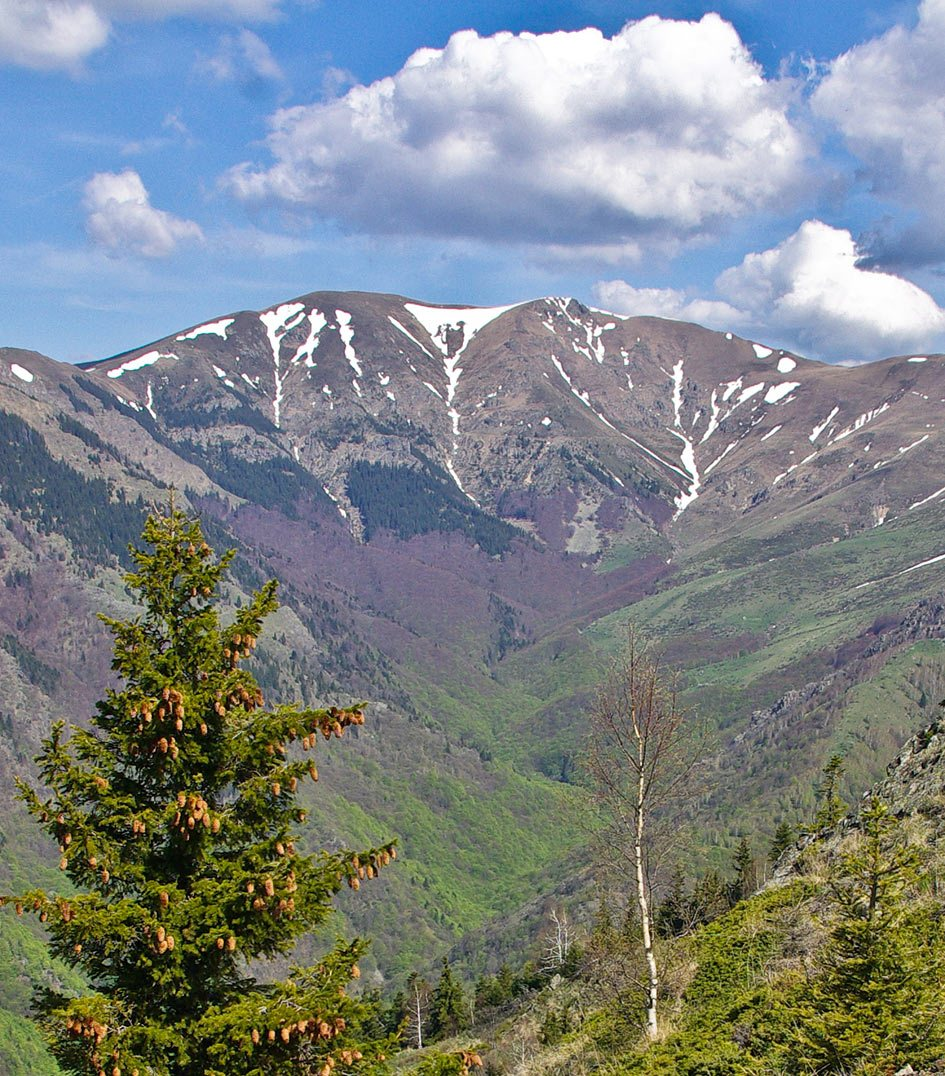
- Levski Peak

Highest point
- Elevation: 2,166 m (7,106 ft)
- Coordinates: 42°43′13″N 24°46′53″E

Naming
- Native name: Левски (Bulgarian)

Geography
- Location: Lovech Province, Bulgaria
- Parent range: Balkan Mountains

Levski Peak (Bulgarian: Левски [ˈlɛfski]), or Ambaritsa is a peak in the Central Balkan Mountains in Lovech Province, Bulgaria. It is named after the famous Bulgarian revolutionary Vasil Levski. The peak is 2,166 metres (7,106 ft) high and is situated on the main ridge of the mountain range to the west of Golyam Kupen Peak, in Troyanska mountain, forming part of the Central Balkan National Park.

The peak is more famous with its old name, Ambaritsa. According to the local legends Krali Marko's granaries were located in the area. The Ambaritsa Refuge is situated on its northern slopes, at 2 hours of the peak.
