= Covered Bridge, Lovech =

Covered Bridge (Покрит мост)
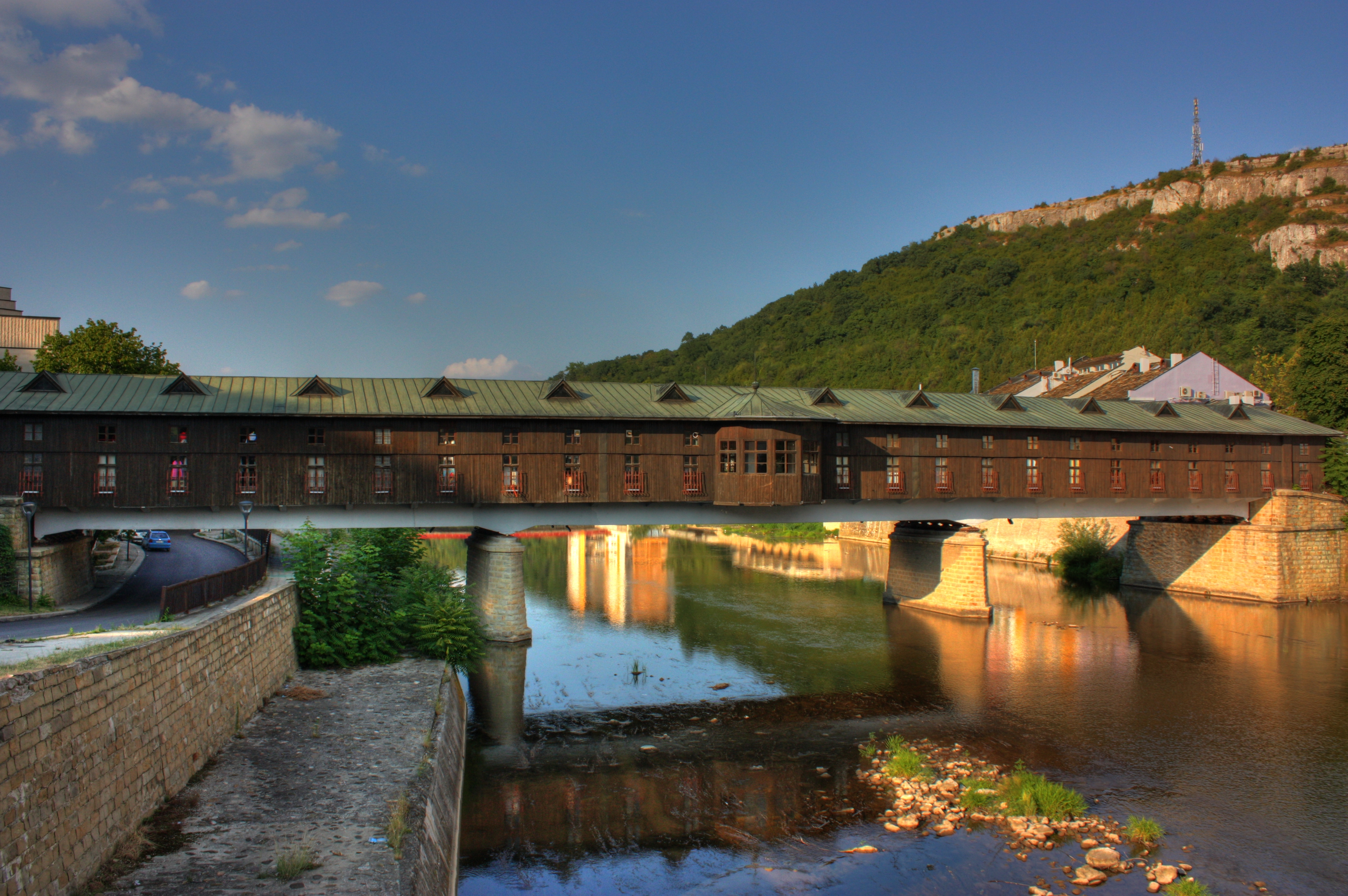
- Coordinates: 43°06′N 24°42′E
- Carries: pedestrians
- Crosses: the Osam
- Locale: Lovech, Bulgaria

Characteristics
- Design: covered bridge
- Total length: 106 m

History
- Opened: 1874; reconstructed in 1981-1982

Location
- Interactive map of Covered Bridge (Покрит мост)

The Covered Bridge (Bulgarian: Покрит мост, Pokrit most) is a covered bridge in the town of Lovech, Bulgaria. It has also been termed Osam Bridge.

The bridge crosses the Osam River, connecting the old (Varоsha) and new town parts of Lovech, being possibly the most recognisable symbol of the town. The bridge is one of the few remaining in Europe that have shops on them. Other examples include the Krämerbrücke in Erfurt and the Ponte Vecchio in Florence.

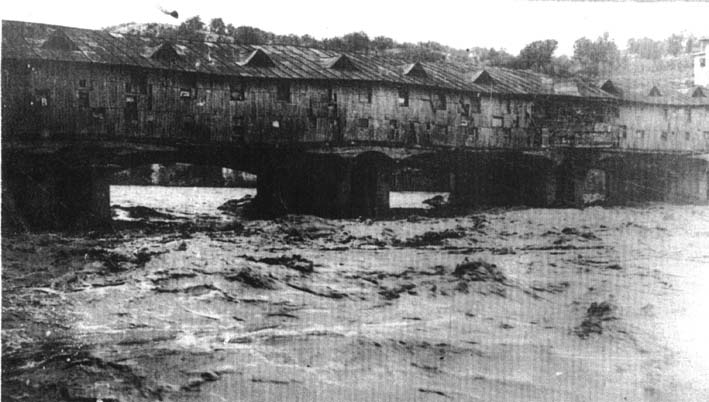
The original bridge before the fire in 1925

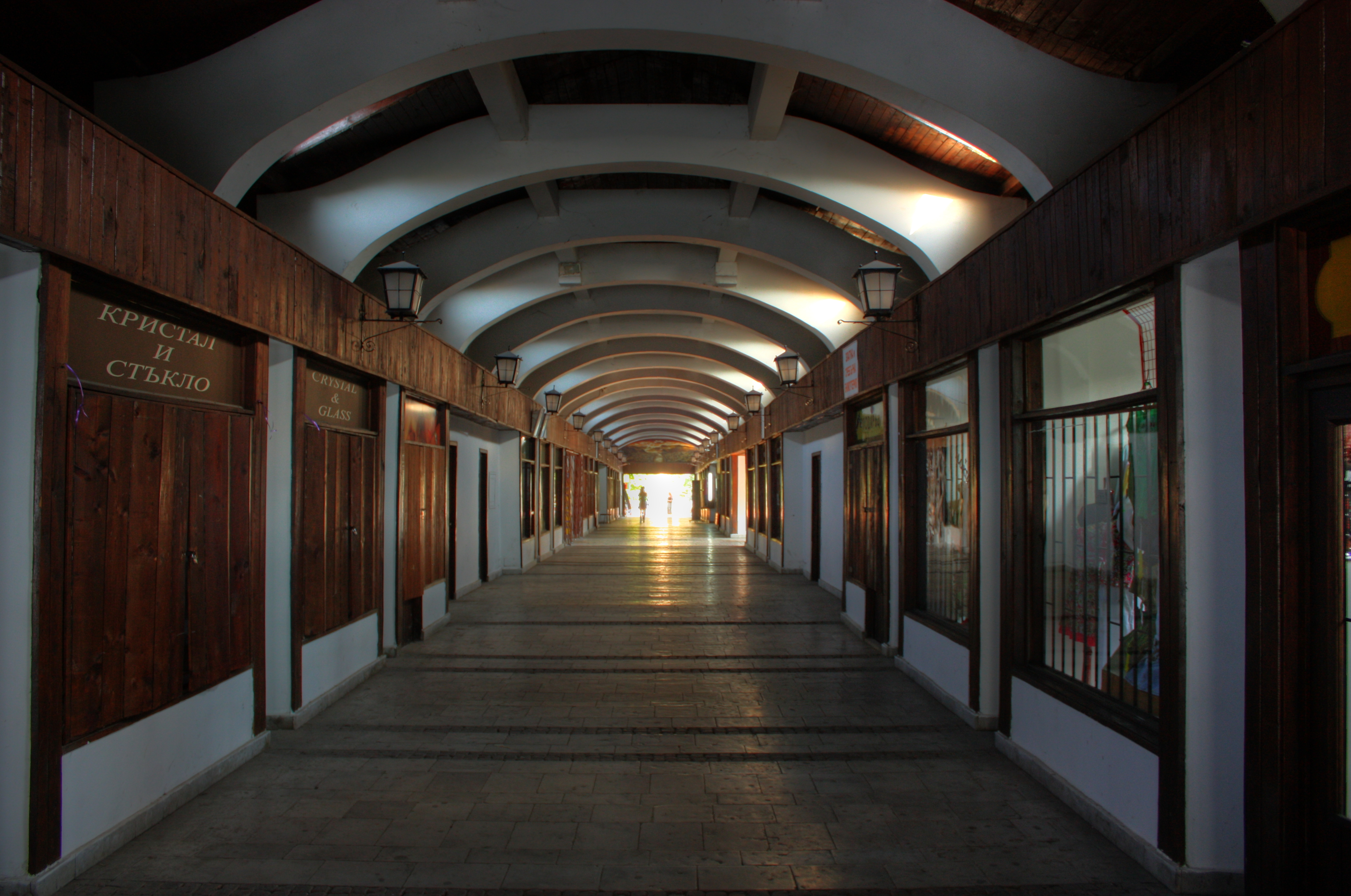
Inside the Covered Bridge

After the bridge that then served the town was almost completely destroyed by a flood in 1872, the local police chief ordered the famous Bulgarian master builder Kolyu Ficheto to construct a new one. Ficheto personally chose the material for the wooden bridge. Each citizen of Lovech contributed to the building process, the poorer ones working themselves and the wealthier donating money and paying other workers. Building finished in 1874.

The bridge was decorated by four sculpture figures, a lion, a two-headed eagle, female bust, and a stick with a mace. The lion figure can be found on the bridge today.

The initial bridge had a length of 84 m and 6 vents and accommodated 64 shops. It was, however, wholly destroyed by fire on the night of 2 to 3 August 1925. A more modern bridge was constructed at its place in 1931 only to be replaced by a reconstruction of Kolyu Ficheto's design in 1981–82. The current bridge is 106 m long and has 14 shops, the architect being Zlatev.
