= Lovech Municipality =

Municipality in Bulgaria

Lovech Municipality Община Ловеч
- Municipality
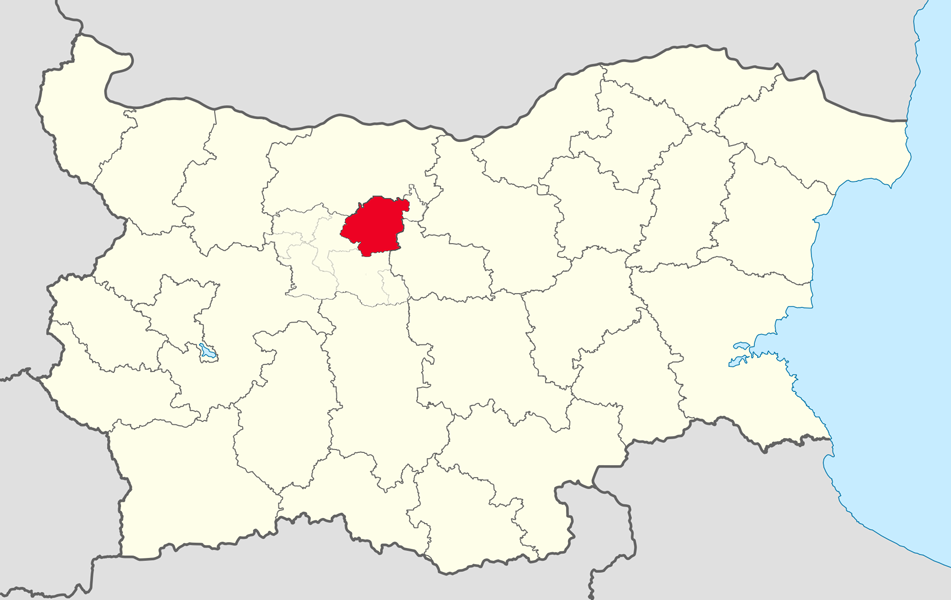
- Lovech Municipality within Bulgaria and Lovech Province.
- Coordinates: 43°8′N 24°44′E
- Country: Bulgaria
- Province (Oblast): Lovech
- Admin. centre (Obshtinski tsentar): Lovech

Area
  - Total: 930.8 km^{2} (359.4 sq mi)

Population (December 2009)
  - Total: 53,578
  - Density: 57.56/km^{2} (149.1/sq mi)
- Time zone: UTC+2 (EET)
  - Summer (DST): UTC+3 (EEST)

Lovech Municipality (Bulgarian: Община Ловеч) is a municipality (obshtina) in Lovech Province, Central-North Bulgaria, located on the border between the area of the Fore-Balkan and the Danubian Plain. It is named after its administrative centre - the city of Lovech which is also the capital of the province.

The municipality is 930.8 km^{2} (359.4 sq mi) with a population of 53,578 inhabitants, as of December 2009.

The area is known with the covered bridge by Kolyu Ficheto, in the main town, and the spectacular Devetaki cave near to the homonymous village.

== Settlements ==
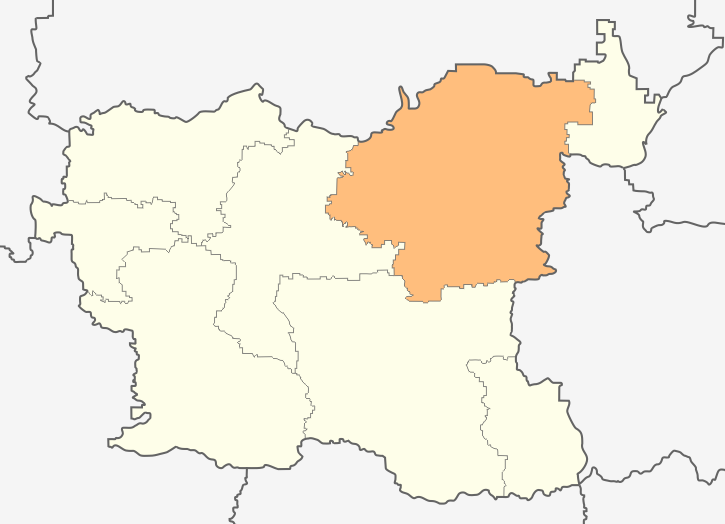
Lovech Municipality within Lovech Province

Lovech Municipality includes the following 35 places (towns are shown in bold):

Town/Village	Cyrillic	Population (December 2009)
**Lovech**	**Ловеч**	38,579
Ablanitsa	Абланица	228
Aleksandrovo	Александрово	2,074
Bahovitsa	Баховица	1,058
Brestovo	Брестово	212
Balgarene	Българене	242
Chavdartsi	Чавдарци	388
Devetaki	Деветаки	243
Doyrentsi	Дойренци	1,250
Drenov	Дренов	429
Dabrava	Дъбрава	38
Goran	Горан	373
Gorno Pavlikene	Горно Павликене	242
Gostinya	Гостиня	186
Hlevene	Хлевене	304
Izvorche	Изворче	54
Kazachevo	Казачево	324
Kakrina	Къкрина	313
Leshnitsa	Лешница	175
Lisets	Лисец	781
Malinovo	Малиново	778
Prelom	Прелом	102
Presyaka	Пресяка	356
Radyuvene	Радювене	797
Skobelevo	Скобелево	321
Slavyani	Славяни	794
Slatina	Слатина	879
Slivek	Сливек	121
Smochan	Смочан	305
Sokolovo	Соколово	144
Slatina	Стефаново	94
Tepava	Тепава	122
Umarevtsi	Умаревци	371
Vladinya	Владиня	490
Yoglav	Йоглав	411
Total		53,578

== Demography ==
The following table shows the change of the population during the last four decades. Since 1992 Lovech Municipality has comprised the former municipality of Aleksandrovo and the numbers in the table reflect this unification.

Lovech Municipality
Year	1975	1985	1992	2001	2005	2007	2009	2011
Population	64,767	64,544	69,423	62,162	57,160	55,545	53,578	...
Sources: Census 2001, Census 2011, „pop-stat.mashke.org“,

=== Religion ===
According to the latest Bulgarian census of 2011, the religious composition, among those who answered the optional question on religious identification, was the following:

Religious composition of Lovech Municipality
Orthodox Christianity	77.6%
Catholicism	0.8%
Protestantism	0.8%
Islam	3.9%
No religion	7.0%
Prefer not to answer, others and indefinable	9.9%

== See also ==
- Provinces of Bulgaria
- Municipalities of Bulgaria
- List of cities and towns in Bulgaria
