= Lovech Fortress =

Medieval stronghold

Coordinates: 43.1278°N 24.7157°E

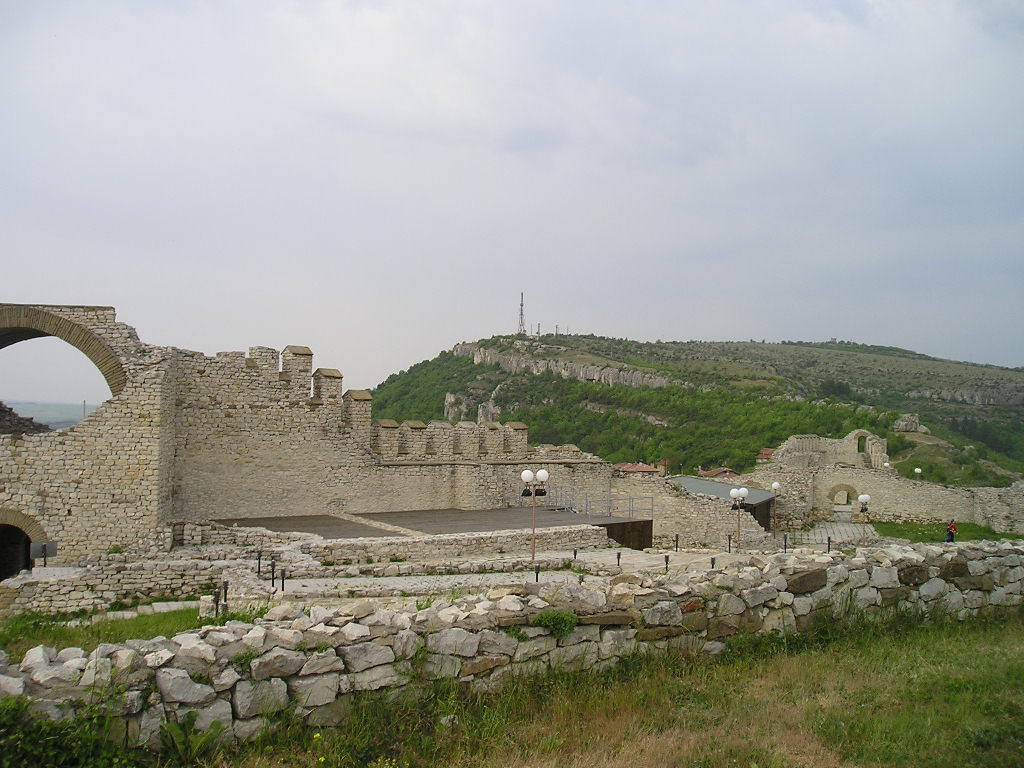
- The outer walls of the fortress

Site information
- Type: Fortress
- Open to the public: Yes
- Status: Protected site

Site history
- Built: 9th–10th century (current structure)
- Events: Siege of Lovech; Bulgarian-Ottoman Wars

Lovech Fortress is a medieval stronghold in Lovech, Bulgaria, that gained prominence during the Second Bulgarian Empire. After the Byzantine Empire unsuccessfully besieged Lovech in 1187, it was forced to recognize de facto the restoration of the Bulgarian state. The town remained an important economic and commercial centre until the fall of Bulgaria under Ottoman rule in the early 15th century.

It was at Lovech Fortress in 1187 that the Second Bulgarian Empire came into being, after the Byzantines failed to capture the fortress and town. Coincidentally, Lovech was also one of the last holdouts of Bulgarian rule after the destruction of the Second Bulgarian Empire during the Bulgarian-Ottoman Wars, the Second Bulgarian Empire was dissolved in 1396, but Lovech held out until 1446.

== History ==
=== Early history ===
A Roman fortress was constructed on the current site, remnants of it were incorporated into the later medieval castle. The current fortress was mainly built in the 9th and 10th centuries.

=== Siege of Lovech ===
In spring 1187, Byzantines besieged the fortress of Lovech. This lasted for three months and was a failure. Their success was the capture of Asen's wife, but alas Isaac was forced to accept a truce, as such forming a facto recognition of the restoration of the Bulgarian Empire.

=== Later history ===
At the beginning of the 14th century, the citadel was the residence of Tsar Ivan Alexander. The fortress played an important defensive role during the invasion of the Ottoman Turks in the 14th century.

Lovech Fortress was one of the last strongholds to fall to the Ottomans, holding out until 1446. Due to its long and spirited resistance, Lovech enjoyed several privileges for many years after it was conquered.

== Description ==
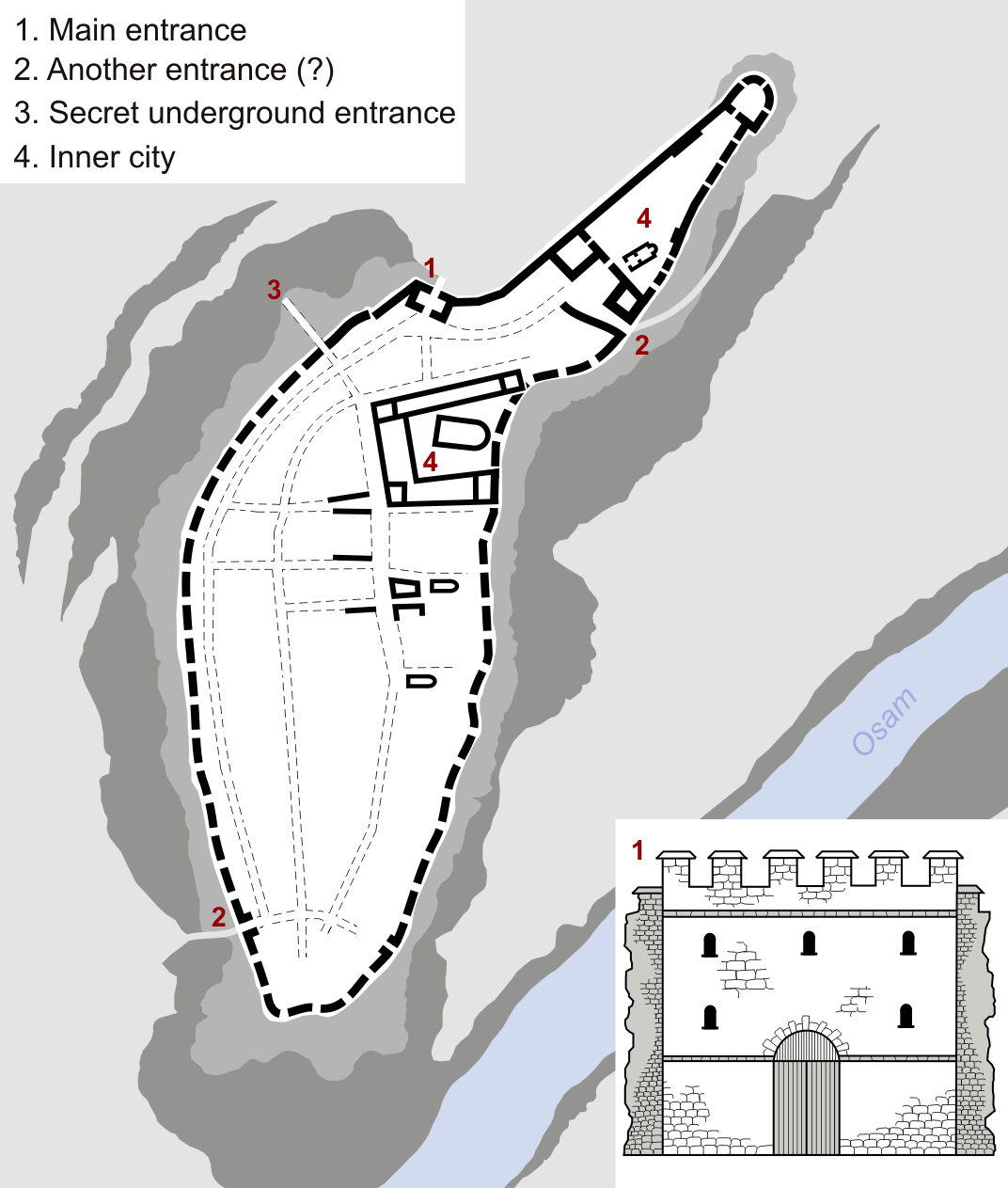
Plan of Lovech Fortress

The Lovech Fortress is positioned on the two terraces of Hisarya Hill in the old part of Lovech. It is among the most visited landmarks in Lovech. In 1967, it was declared a monument of architecture and construction; a product of publication in the State Gazette, issue #75
