= Aleksandrovo, Lovech Province =

Village in Bulgaria

Aleksandrovo Александрово
- Village
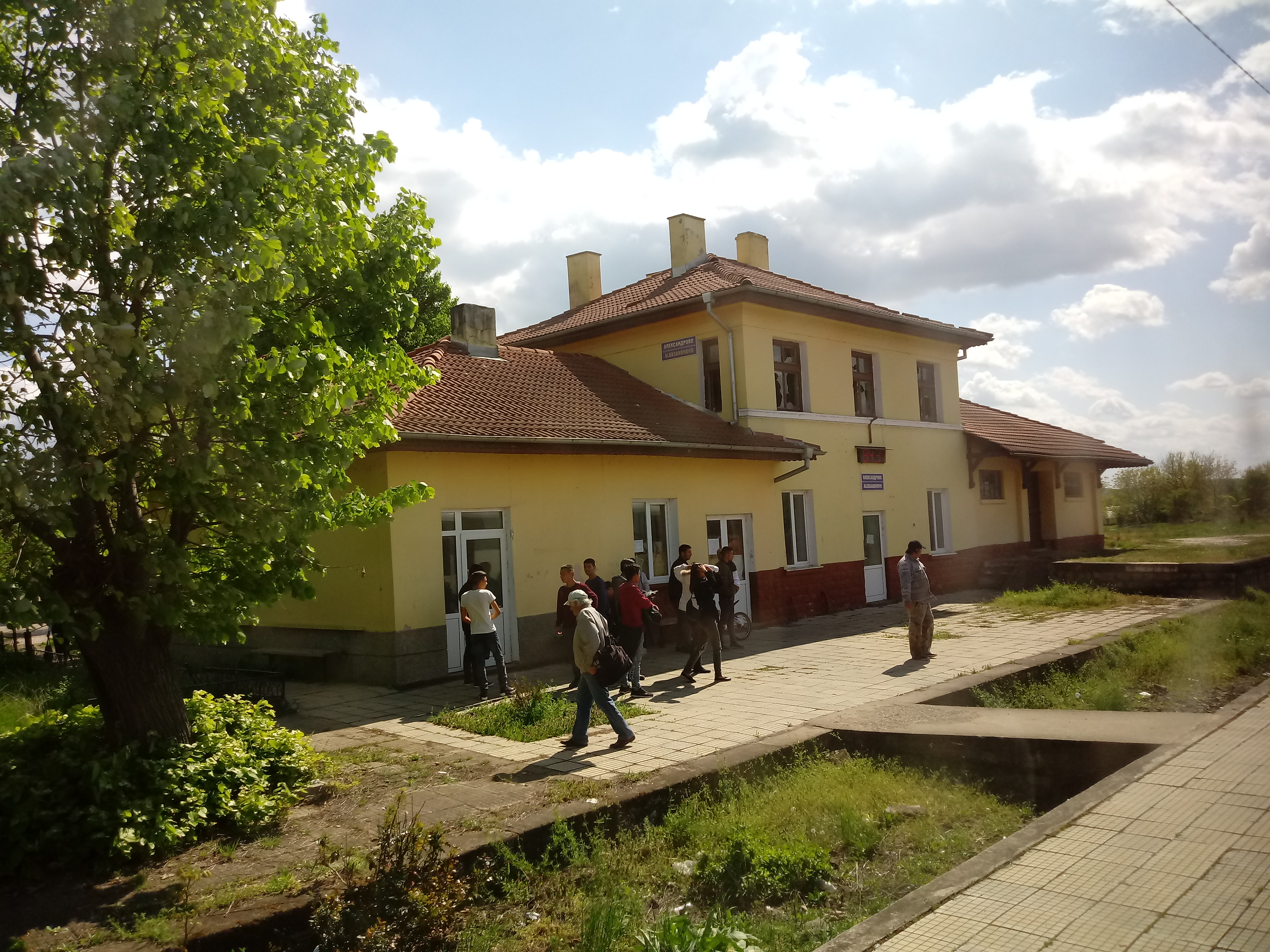
- Train station

- Location within Bulgaria
- Coordinates: 43.2500°N 24.9500°E
- Country: Bulgaria
- Province: Lovech Province
- Municipality: Lovech

Population (February 2011 (census))
  - Total: ▼1,548
- Time zone: UTC+2 (EET)
  - Summer (DST): UTC+3 (EEST)

Aleksandrovo is a village in Lovech Municipality, Lovech Province, northern Bulgaria.

Aleksandrovo has a population of 1,548. It is an ethnically diverse village. Most people are Bulgarians (828), followed by Turks (447), and a few Romani.
