= Lovech Province =

Province of Bulgaria

Lovech Province Oбласт Ловеч
- Province
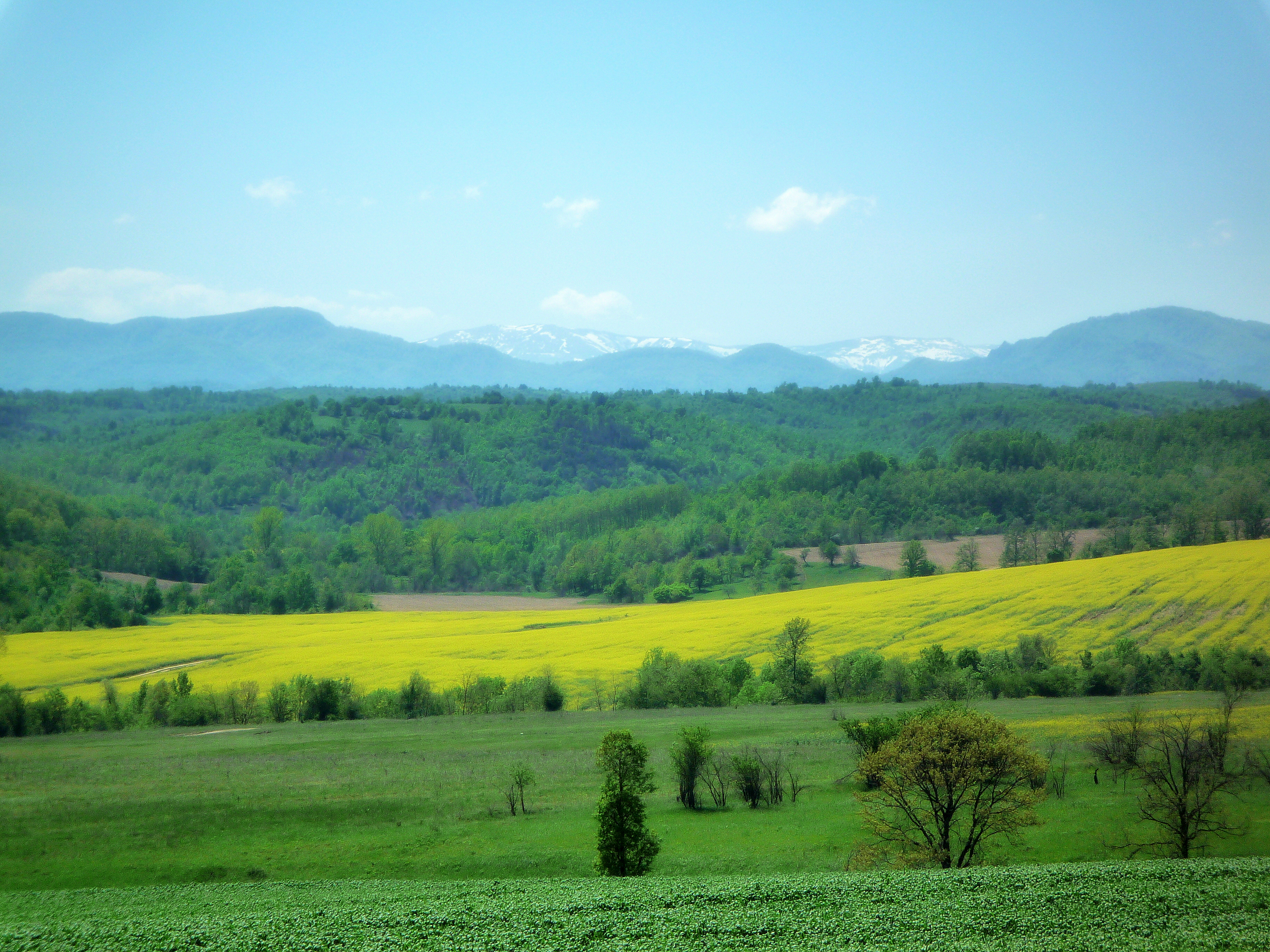
- A view to the Balkan Mountains in Lovech Province

- Flag

- Location of Lovech Province in Bulgaria
- Country: Bulgaria
- Capital: Lovech
- Municipalities: 8

Government
  - Governor: Georgi Terziyski

Area
  - Total: 4,128 km^{2} (1,594 sq mi)

Population (December 2022)
  - Total: 113,356
  - Density: 27.46/km^{2} (71.12/sq mi)
- Time zone: UTC+2 (EET)
  - Summer (DST): UTC+3 (EEST)
- License plate: OB
- Website: lovech.government.bg

Lovech Province (Bulgarian: Област Ловеч, romanized: Oblast Lovech, former name Lovech okrug) is one of the 28 provinces of Bulgaria, lying at the northern centre of the country. It is named after its main city: Lovech. As of December 2009, the population of the area was 151,153. It covers a total area of approximately 4,129 km^{2} and includes 8 municipalities.

== Geography and Nature ==
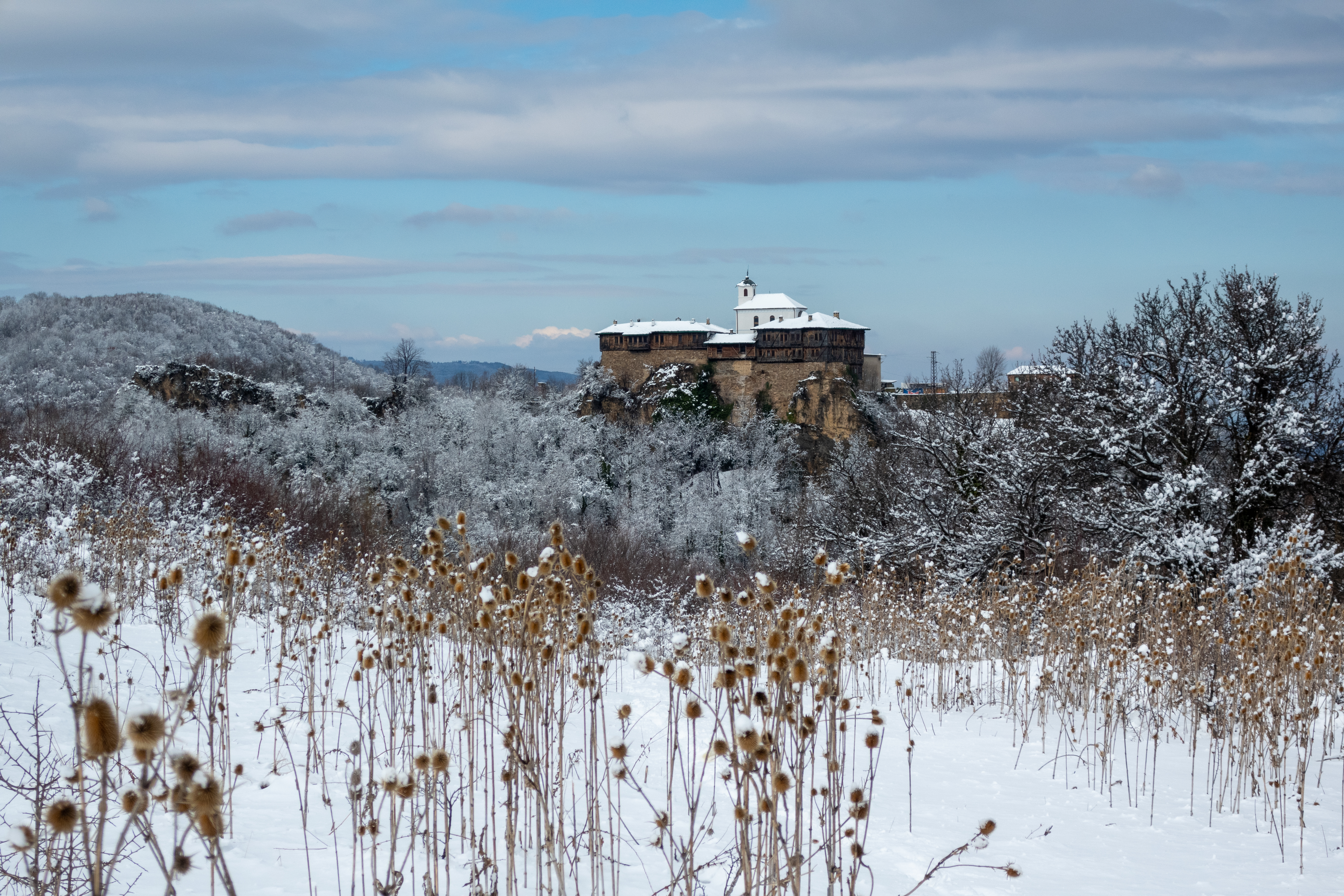
Winter view of the Glozhene Monastery near Teteven

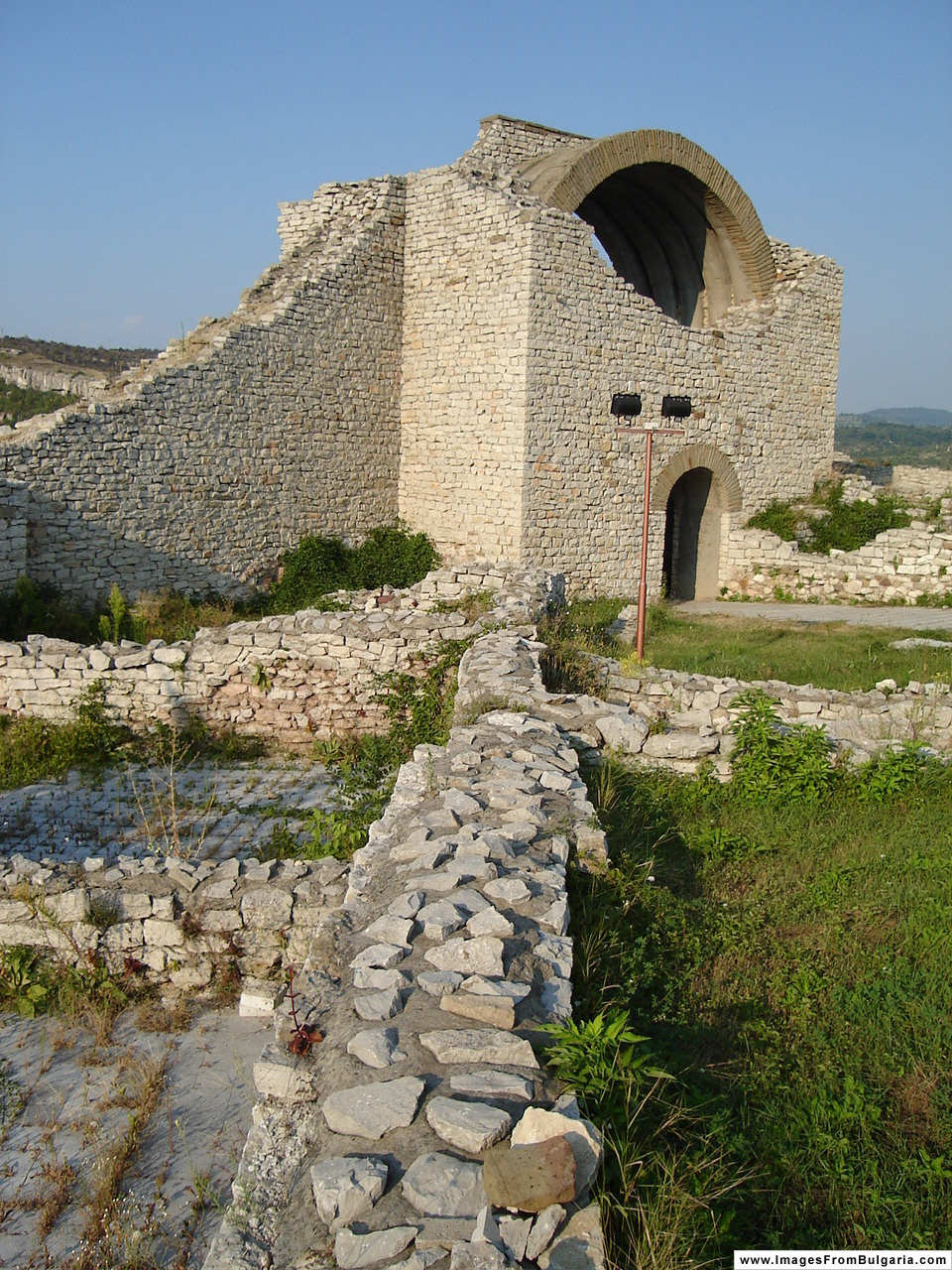
The ruins of the medieval Lovech Fortress

The region is characterised by a mix of mountainous and lowland terrain, with significant rivers including the Osam, Vit, and Zlatna Panega flowing through it. Much of the province lies within the northern foothills of the Balkan Mountains, contributing to a varied landscape of forests, rivers, and karst formations.

Lovech Province is home to parts of the Central Balkan National Park, one of the largest protected areas in Bulgaria. The park includes several reserves such as:

- Steneto Reserve – known for its deep gorges and rich biodiversity.
- Boatin Reserve – featuring ancient beech forests and habitats for rare bird species.
- Tsarichina Reserve – preserving typical Central Balkan flora and fauna.

Numerous karst caves can be found in the region, including:

- Devetashka Cave – one of the largest caves in Bulgaria, known for its impressive natural arches and archaeological significance.
- Prohodna Cave – known for the two eye-like holes in its ceiling, called 'Eyes of God'.
- Saeva Dupka Cave – famous for its beautiful stalactites and stalagmites, and acoustics suitable for concerts.

== Cultural and Historical Sites ==
The province has a rich historical heritage with over 600 cultural monuments, ranging from Thracian and Roman times to the Bulgarian National Revival. Notable landmarks include:

- Troyan Monastery – the third largest monastery in Bulgaria, founded in the 16th century, known for its frescoes by Zahari Zograf.
- Glozhene Monastery – perched on a cliff near the village of Glozhene, offering panoramic views and historical significance.
- The Covered Bridge, Lovech – a unique structure built by Bulgarian master Kolyu Ficheto in the 19th century, connecting the old town (Varosha) with the new part of the city.

The architectural reserve Varosha, located in Lovech, preserves numerous Revival-style houses and churches, and the Vasil Levski Museum honors the legacy of Bulgaria’s national hero.

== Tourism and Economy ==
Lovech Province is a growing tourist destination, attracting visitors with its natural beauty, cultural landmarks, and thermal springs. The village of Shipkovo is known for its mineral water and balneotherapy, while Apriltsi, Teteven, and Troyan offer mountain tourism, hiking, and traditional crafts.

Economically, the province is supported by industries such as food processing, woodworking, and machine-building, with tourism playing an increasingly important role.

== Municipalities ==
The Lovech Province (област, oblast) contains eight municipalities (singular: община, obshtina - plural: общини, obshtini). The following table shows the names of each municipality in English and Cyrillic, the main town or village (in bold), and the population as of December 2009.

Municipality	Cyrillic	Pop.	Town/Village	Pop.
Apriltsi	Априлци	3,554	Apriltsi	3,207
Letnitsa	Летница	5,101	Letnitsa	3,739
Lovech	Ловеч	53,578	Lovech	38,579
Lukovit	Луковит	19,469	Lukovit	9,630
Teteven	Тетевен	22,016	Teteven	10,613
Troyan	Троян	33,827	Troyan	21,997
Ugarchin	Угърчин	7,181	Ugarchin	2,832
Yablanitsa	Ябланица	6,427	Yablanitsa	2,896

== Demographics ==
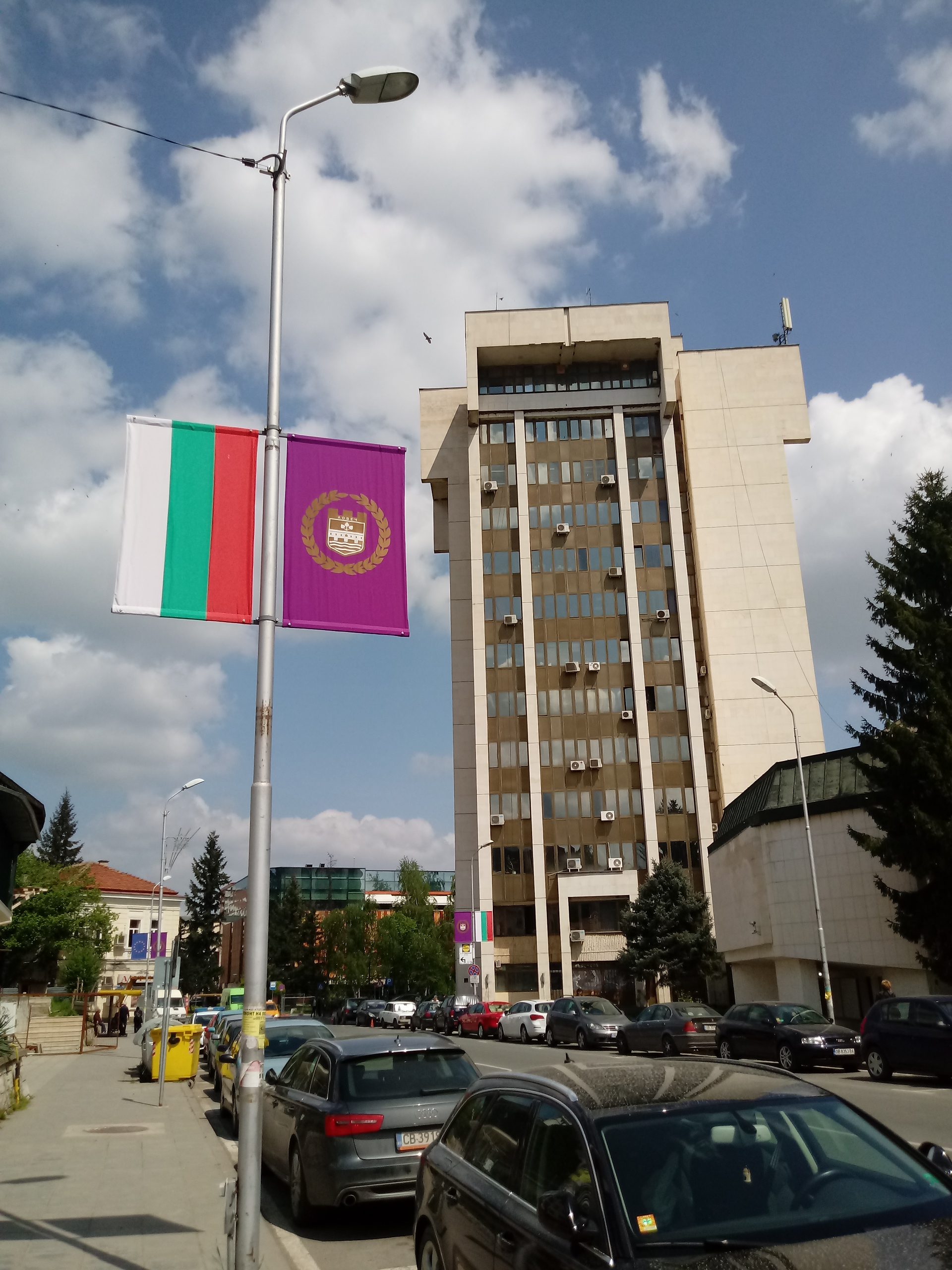
Building of Lovech Province administration

Historical population
Year	Pop.	±%
1946	217,203	—
1956	214,213	−1.4%
1965	217,342	+1.5%
1975	216,844	−0.2%
1985	202,968	−6.4%
1992	190,262	−6.3%
2001	169,951	−10.7%
2011	141,422	−16.8%
2021	116,394	−17.7%
Source: pop-stat.mashke.org

The Lovech province had a population of 169,951 according to a 2001 census, of which 49.1% were male and 50.9% were female.

As of the end of 2009, the population of the province, announced by the Bulgarian National Statistical Institute, numbered 151,153 of which 29.4% are inhabitants aged over 60 years.

=== Ethnic groups ===
Ethnic groups in Lovech Province (2011 census)
Ethnic group	Percentage
Bulgarians	90.9%
Romani	4.4%
Turks	3.3%
others and indefinable	1.4%

Total population (2011 census): 141 422
Ethnic groups (2011 census): Identified themselves: 130 180 persons:

- Bulgarians: 118 346 (90,91%)
- Romani: 5 705 (4,38%)
- Turks: 4 337 (3,33%)
- Others and indefinable: 1 792 (1,38%)

A further 11,000 persons in the Province did not declare their ethnic group at the 2011 census

In the 2001 census, 167,877 people of the population of 169,951 of Lovech Province identified themselves as belonging to one of the following ethnic groups (with percentage of total population):

Ethnic group	Population	Percentage
Bulgarians	152,194	89.552%
Turkish	8,476	4.987%
Romani	6,316	3.716%
Russians	269	0.158%
Armenians	12	0.007%
Vlachs (Aromanians, Romanians, Romanian-speaking Boyash)	458	0.269%
Macedonians	7	0.004%
Greeks	21	0.012%
Ukrainians	29	0.017%
Jewish	1	0.001%
Romanians (self-declared)	3	0.002%
Other	91	0.054%

=== Language ===
In the 2001 census, 168,307 people of the population of 169,951 of Lovech Province identified one of the following as their mother tongue (with percentage of total population): 154,157 Bulgarian (90.7%), 6,994 Turkish (4.1%), 6,033 Romani (3.5%), and 1,123 other (0.7%).

=== Religion ===
Religions in Lovech Province (2011 census)
Religious group	Percentage
Orthodox Christian	59.75%
Muslim	2.3%
Protestant Christian	0.9%
Roman Catholic Christian	0.5%
others and indefinable	36.46%

Religious adherence in the province according to 2001 census:

Census 2001
religious adherence	population	%
Orthodox Christians	146,778	86.36%
Muslims	10,501	6.18%
Protestants	879	0.52%
Roman Catholics	366	0.22%
Other	688	0.40%
Religion not mentioned	10,739	6.32%
**total**	**169,951**	100%

== See also ==
- Provinces of Bulgaria
- Municipalities of Bulgaria
- List of cities and towns in Bulgaria
- List of villages in Lovech Province
