= I-4 road (Bulgaria) =

Road in Bulgaria

Republic Road I-4
- Републикански път I-4
- I-4 road highlighted in orange

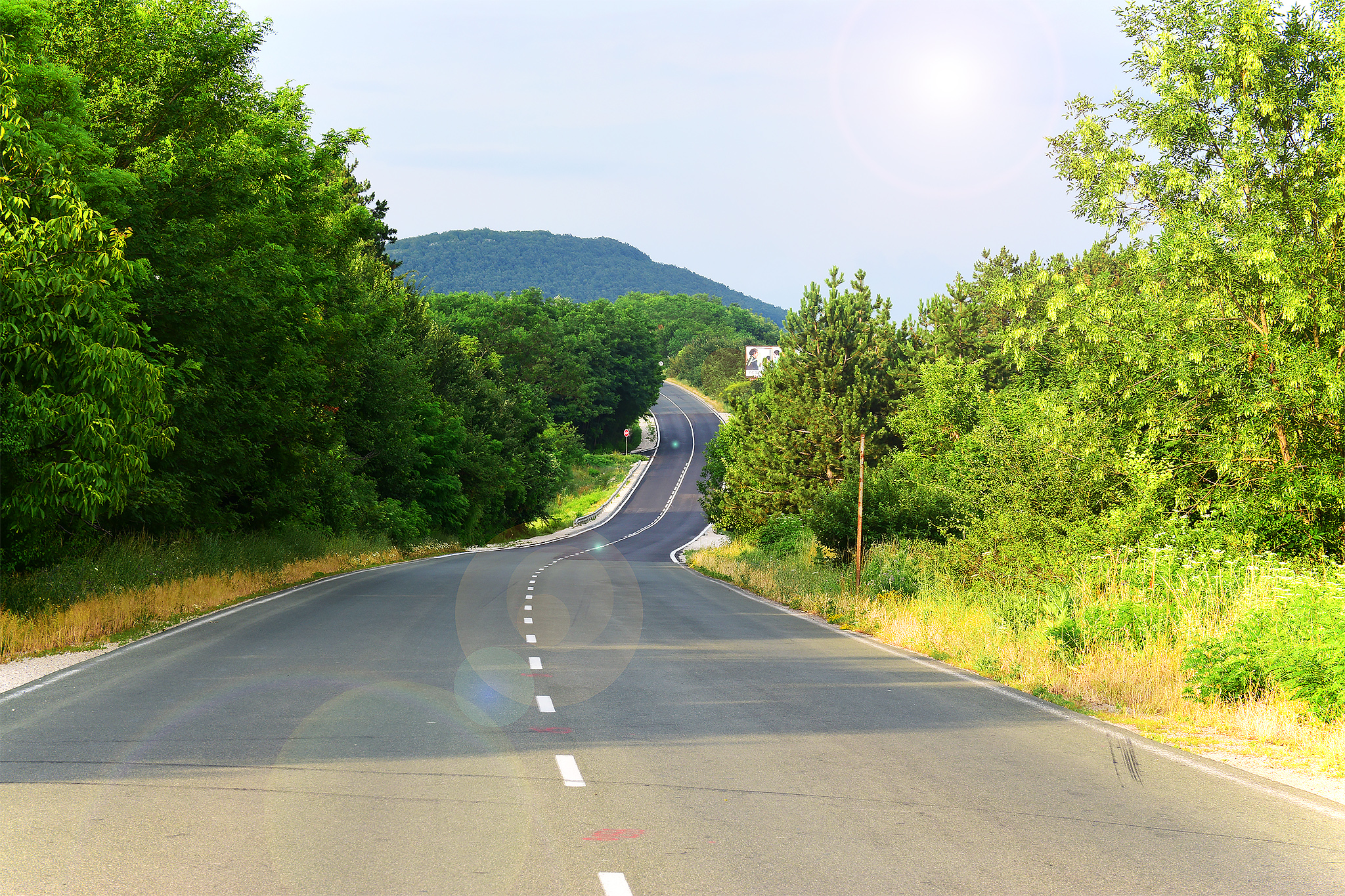
- I-4 between Sevlievo and Novo Selo

Route information
- Length: 264.3 km (164.2 mi)

Major junctions
- From: , Yablanitsa
- To: , Shumen

Location
- Country: Bulgaria
- Major cities: Lovech, Targovishte

Highway system
- Highways in Bulgaria

Republican road I-4 (Bulgarian: Републикански път I-4) is a major road in Northern Bulgaria. It runs between I-3 road, at the town of Yablanitsa, and I-2 road, at the city of Shumen. The total length of the road is 264.3 km (164.2 mi) and it follows European route E772. The road passes through the provinces of Lovech, Gaborovo, Veliko Tarnovo, Targovishte and Shumen.

== Description ==
The road begins from a junction at Km 155.8 of the first class I-3 road some 5.8 km northeast of the town of Yablanitsa and heads east throughout its whole route through the fore-Balkan, a hilly region north of the Balkan Mountains. It passes through the village of Brestinitsa, where it links with the Hemus motorway, descends to the valley of the river Vit and then ascends following its right tributary the Kalnik, running through Balgarski Izvor. At the village of Sopot the I-4 enters the valley of another right tributary of the Vit, the Kamenitsa. From there, it follows the northern slopes of the Mikrene Heights, runs through the villages of Mikre and Golets and via the valley of the Dripla descends to the river Osam. After crossing the Osam, the road runs north of the villages of Balgarene and Malinovo and enters Gabrovo Province at Petko Slaveykov.

In Gabrovo Province the I-4 road enters the Sevlievo Valley, passing through Ryahovtsite, Sevlievo and Bogatovo. It ascends the valley of the Choparata, a right tributary of the Rositsa, overcomes a watershed at the villages of Idilevo and reaches valley of the Negovanka, also right tributary of the Rositsa, and enters Veliko Tarnovo Province.

Close to Novo Selo the road exits the valley of the Negovanka and ascends the ridge of the Tarnovo Heights. It then passes through the villages of Balvan, Momin Sbor and Ledenik and reaches the city of Veliko Tarnovo. It runs through the city's southern neighbourhoods, crosses the river Yantra and at the village of Sheremetya ascends the Arbanasi Plateau. The road then descends steeply to the town of Lyaskovets, bypasses it from the south, and reenters the valley of the Yantra. After passing the villages of Kozarevets and Dobri Dyal, it enters the valley of the Stara reka, a right tributary of the Yantra. In the vicinity of the village of Kesarevo the road begins a gradual ascend of the Antonovo Heights, runs through Kavlak and enters Targovishte Province.

In that province the I-4 runs through Moravitsa, Antonovo and Yastrebino and turns southeast. After the village of Kyosevtsi it turns east, bypasses the Yastrebino Reservoir from the south, passes through Kamburovo and reaches of the town of Omurtag. There, the road turns northeast, running between the Lilyak Plateau to the northwest and the Lisa Mountain to the southeast, passes through the village of Prezviter Kozma and near Prolaz enters the valley of the river Vrana, a left tributary of the Golyama Kamchiya. It then goes through the Targovishte Pass along the Vrana and reaches the town of Targovishte, bypassing it from the west and the north. The road continues northeast through the villages of Vasil Levski, Probuda and Alvanovo, and enters Shumen Province.

In Shumen Province the road bypasses the Shumen Plateau, passes near the village of Gradishte, and reaches its terminus at the Belokopitovo junction with the Hemus motorway and the first class I-2 road.
