= Kalnik (river) =

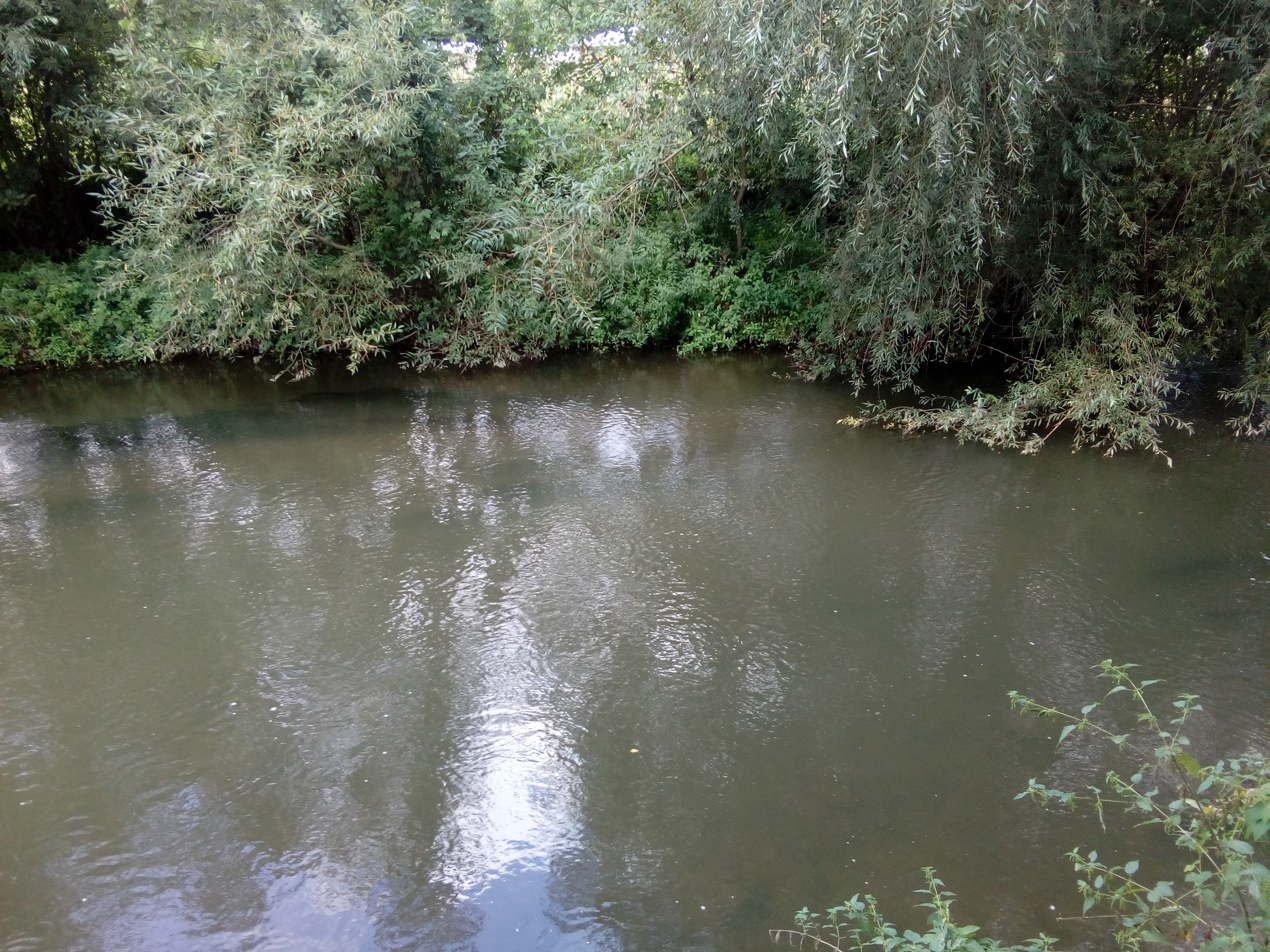

Location
- Country: Bulgaria

Physical characteristics
- Source
  - location: Mikrene Heights
  - coordinates: 42°59′30.84″N 24°34′39″E
  - elevation: 667 m (2,188 ft)
- Mouth
  - location: Vit
  - coordinates: 43°3′48.96″N 24°15′27″E
  - elevation: 250 m (820 ft)
- Length: 41 km (25 mi)
- Basin size: 263 km^{2} (102 sq mi)

Basin features
- Progression: Vit→ Danube→ Black Sea

The Kalnik (Bulgarian: Калник) is a 41 km-long river in northern Bulgaria, a right tributary of the river Vit, itself a right tributary of the Danube.

== Geography ==
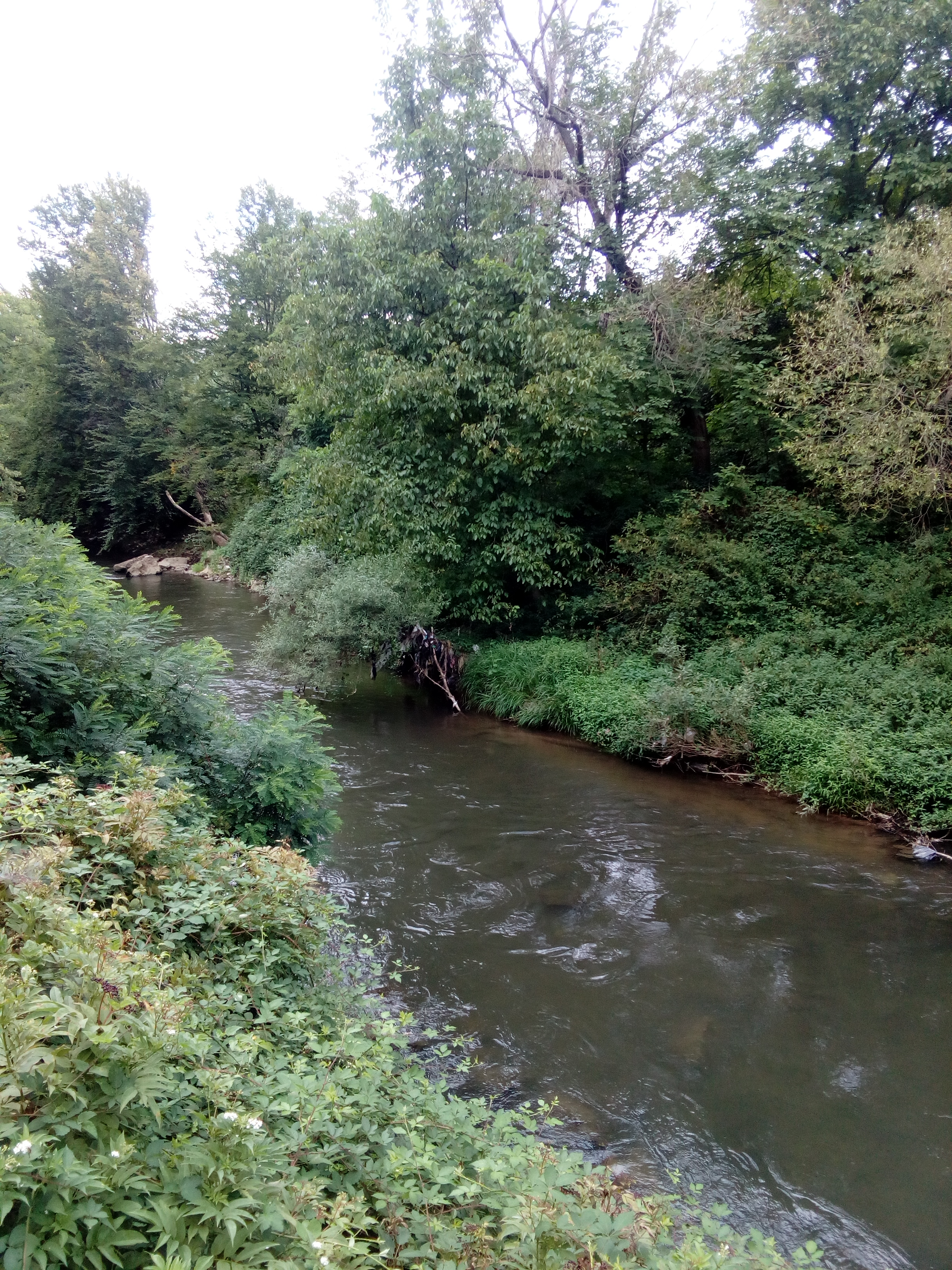
River Kalnik

The Kalnik takes its source from the Tolev Spring at an altitude of 677 m, on the southern foothills of the Mikrene Heights of the fore-Balkan, some 1.5 km north of the village of Borima. Throughout its whole course the river flows westwards with a slight deviation to the north in a wide valley between the Mikrene Heights to the north and the Vasilyovska Mountain to the south. It flows into the Vit at an altitude of 250 m at the Boaza locality, south of the village of Peshterna.

Its drainage basin covers a territory of 263 km^{2} or 8.2% of the Vit's total.

The Kalnik has rain, snow and karst spring feed with high water in April–June and low water in July–October. The average annual discharge is 0.96 m^{3}/s.

== Settlements and economy ==
The river flows entirely in Lovech Province. There are three villages along its course: Staro Selo in Troyan Municipality, Vasilkova Mahala in Slavshtitsa, Ugarchin Municipality and Balgarski Izvor in Teteven Municipality. Its waters are utilized for irrigation. The Sopot Reservoir with a volume of 61.8 million m^{3} is located in its upper course.

There are two roads of the national network through the Kalnik valley, a 12.3 km stretch of the first class I-4 road Yablanitsa–Veliko Tarnovo–Varna between Boaza and the village of Sopot, Lovech Province, and a 16 km section of the third class III-402 road Sopot–Troyan between Sopot and Staro Selo.
