= Kamenitsa (Vit) =

Location
- Country: Bulgaria

Physical characteristics
- Source
  - location: Lovech Heights
  - coordinates: 43°4′36.12″N 24°35′38.04″E
  - elevation: 600 m (2,000 ft)
- Mouth
  - location: Vit
  - coordinates: 43°14′44.16″N 24°22′50.16″E
  - elevation: 136 m (446 ft)
- Length: 49 km (30 mi)
- Basin size: 498 km^{2} (192 sq mi)

Basin features
- Progression: Vit→ Danube→ Black Sea

The Kamenitsa (Bulgarian: Каменица) or Kamenka (Каменка) is a 49 km-long river in northern Bulgaria, a right tributary of the river Vit, itself a right tributary of the Danube. It is the largest tributary of the Vit.

The Kamenitsa takes its source at an altitude of 600 m, in the southwestern foothills of the Lovech Heights of the fore-Balkan, west of the village of Sokolovo. It flows west in a narrow forested valley until the confluence with the Sopotska reka. The river then turns northwest and the valley widens. Downstream of the town of Ugarchin it forms a picturesque gorge and heads north. Upstream of the village of Bezhanovo, the river enters another gorge, takes its largest tributary the Katunetska reka, forms a third gorge and flows into the Vit at an altitude of 136 m some 1.4 km northwest of Bezhanovo.

Its drainage basin covers a territory of 498 km^{2} or 15.4% of the Vit's total.

The Kamenitsa has rain, snow and karst spring feed with high water in March–June and low water in July–October. The average annual discharge at Bezhanovo is 1.9 m^{3}/s.

The river flows entirely in Lovech Province. Along its course are located the town of Ugarchin and the village of Dragana in Ugarchin Municipality and Bezhanovo in Lukovit Municipality. Its waters are utilized for irrigation.

An 11.7 km section of the third class III-307 road Lukovit–Ugarchin–Mikre follows the river valley between the latter two settlements.
