= Prohodna =

Cave in Bulgaria

Prohodna cave
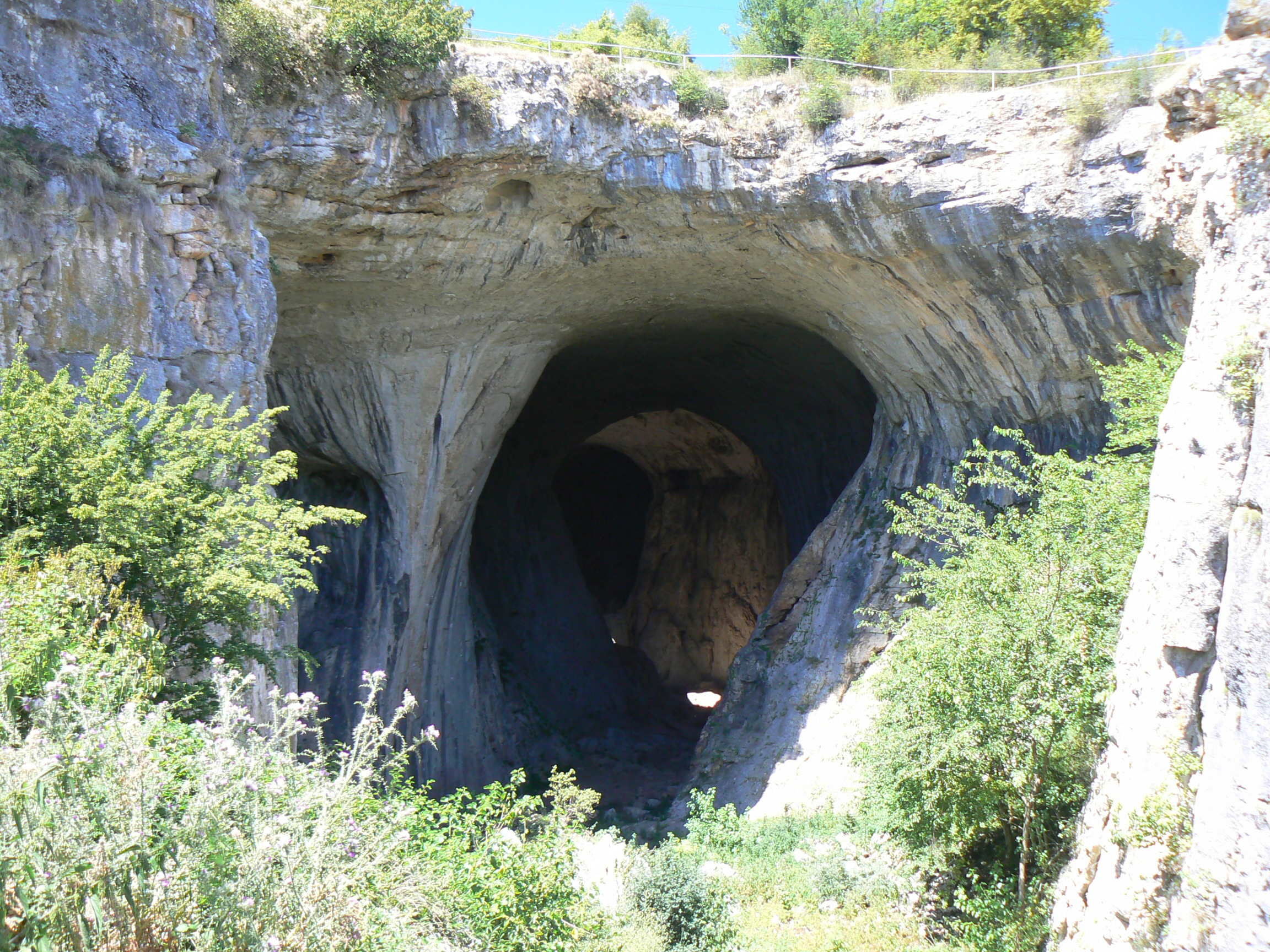
- One of the cave's entrances
- Interactive map of Prohodna cave
- Location: Bulgaria
- Coordinates: 43°10′33″N 24°04′23″E

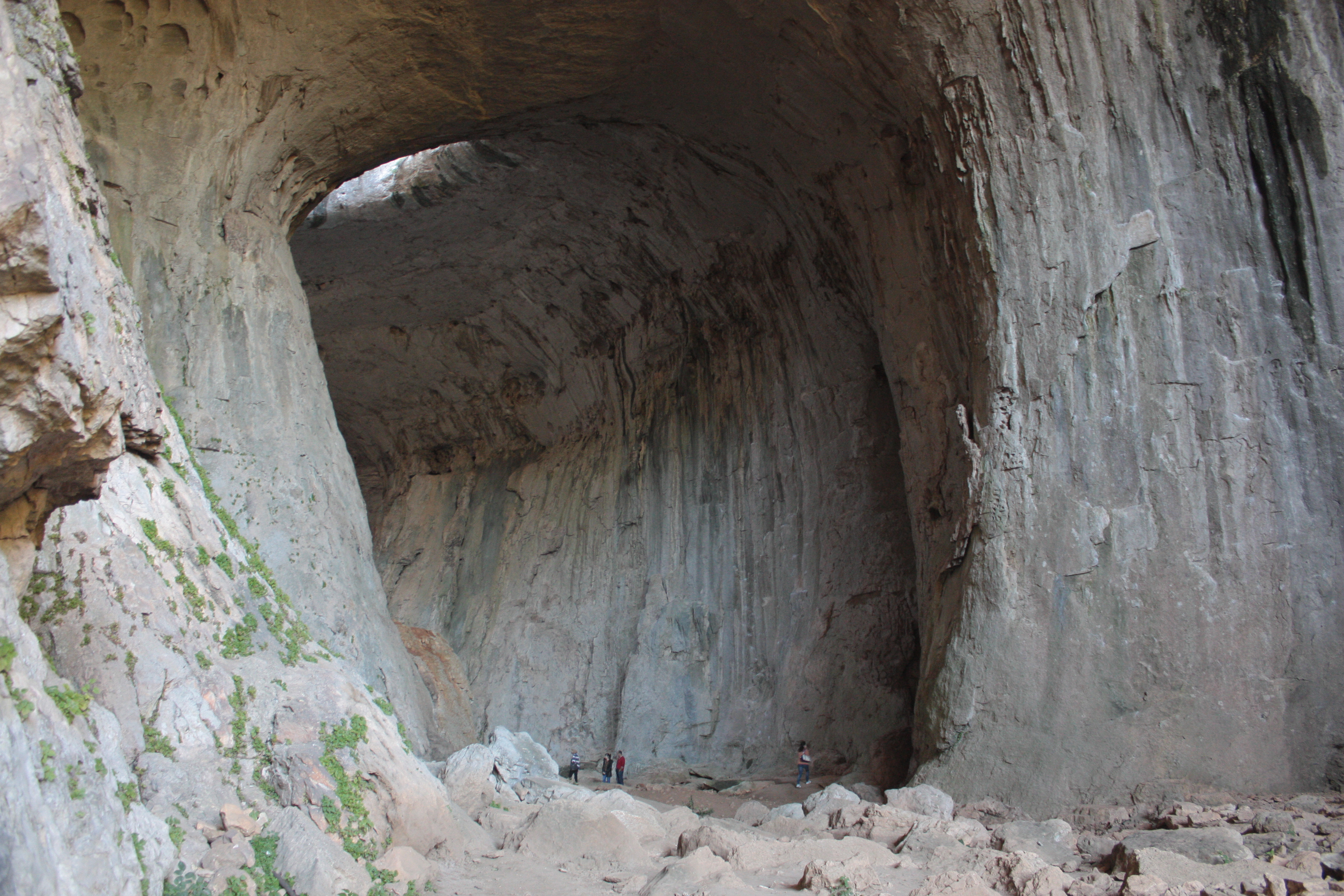
The 'Big Entrance' of Prohodna cave with visitors for scale

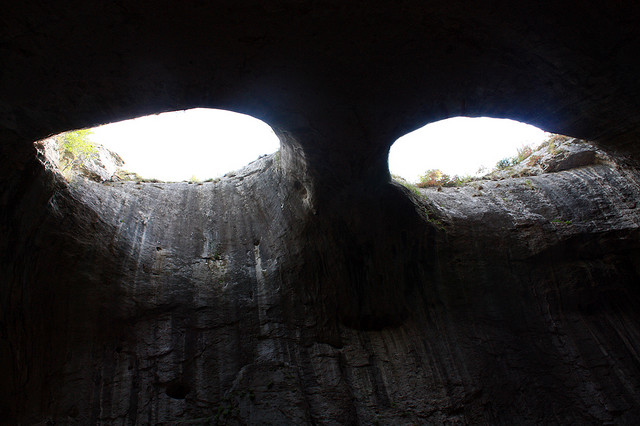
The 'Eyes of God' formation in the ceiling of the Prohodna cave

Prohodna (Bulgarian: Проходна) is a karst cave in north central Bulgaria, located in the Iskar Gorge near the village of Karlukovo in Lukovit Municipality, Lovech Province. The cave is known for the two eye-shaped holes in its ceiling, known as the 'Eyes of God'.

== Description ==
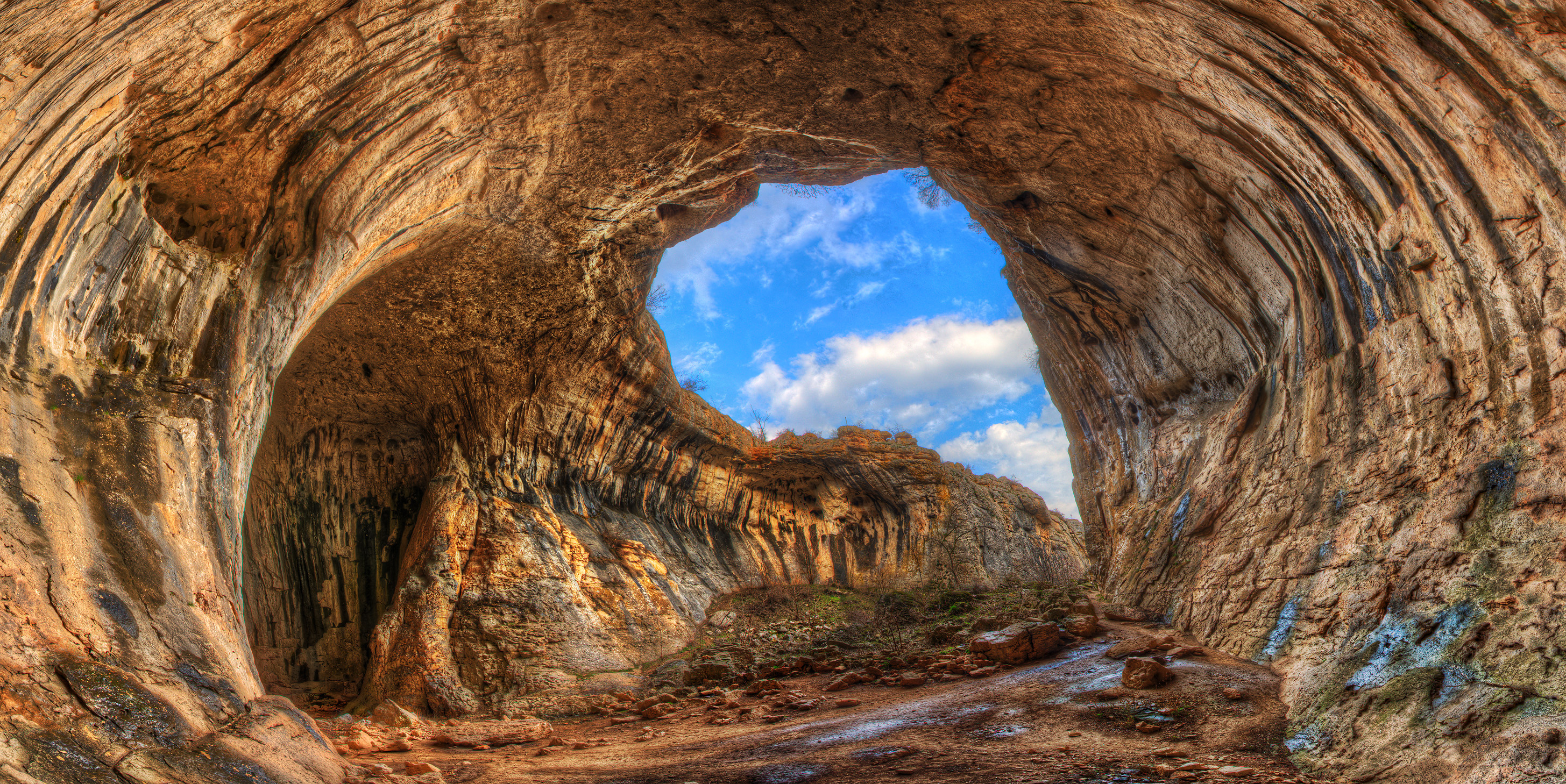
Panorama of the cave's entrance as seen from inside

Prohodna is the best known attraction in the Karlukovo Gorge (part of the Geological Park Iskar-Panega), one of the largest karst regions in Bulgaria and a popular location for speleology. Formed during the Quaternary, Prohodna is 262 m (860 ft) long, which makes it the longest cave passage in Bulgaria. The cave has two entrances which lie opposite one another, known respectively as the 'Small Entrance' and the 'Big Entrance'. The former is 35 m (115 ft) high and the latter reaches 42.5 or 45 m (139 or 148 ft) in height. The cave owes its name, Prohodna, which literally translates to 'Thoroughfare Cave' or 'Passage Cave', to this feature. The size of the Big Entrance of Prohodna makes it suitable for bungee jumping, and it is among the popular spots in Bulgaria for that activity. There are traces of prehistoric habitation in the Prohodna cave, which testify that humans lived in the cave during the Neolithic and Chalcolithic.

=== 'Eyes of God' ===
Prohodna is most notable for the two equal-sized holes in the ceiling of its middle chamber. The holes, formed through erosion, let in light into the cave. The formation is colloquially known as the 'Eyes of God'. The phenomenon was featured in the 1988 Bulgarian film Time of Violence; in the scene, a priest named Aligorko prays below the Eyes.

== Location ==
The cave lies 2 km (1.2 mi) from Karlukovo, near the Karlukovo–Lukovit road. It is also accessible from Rumyantsevo, and there is a parking lot near the Small Entrance. Near Prohodna is the much longer cave Temnata Dupka, and a pathway from the Big Entrance of Prohodna leads to the Petar Tranteev National Caving House, one of the 100 Tourist Sites of Bulgaria.
