= Vit (river) =

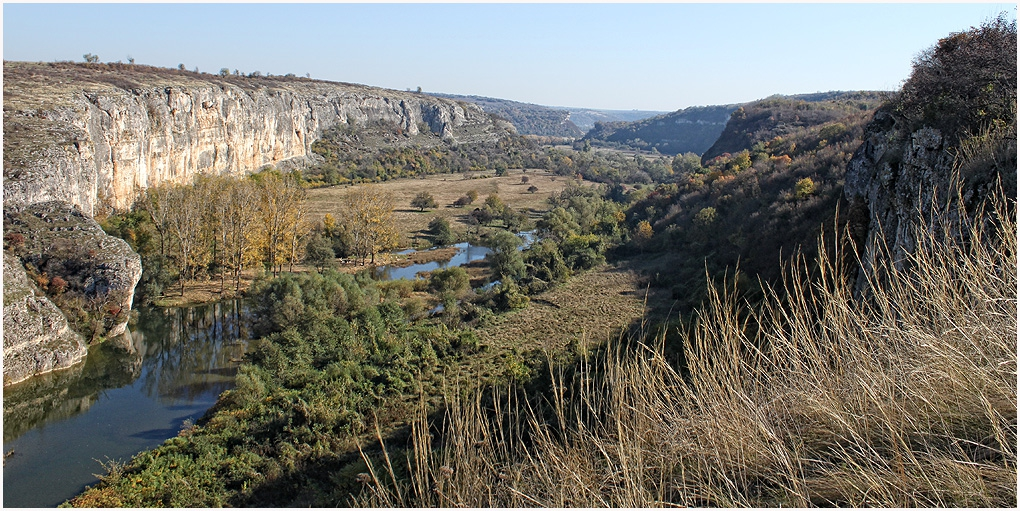

Location
- Country: Bulgaria

Physical characteristics
- Source
  - location: W of Yumruka summit, Balkan Mountains
  - coordinates: 42°45′39.96″N 24°28′41.16″E
  - elevation: 1,596 m (5,236 ft)
- Mouth
  - location: Danube
  - coordinates: 43°40′51.96″N 24°44′35.16″E
  - elevation: 22 m (72 ft)
- Length: 189 km (117 mi)
- Basin size: 3,225 km^{2} (1,245 sq mi)

Basin features
- Progression: Danube→ Black Sea

The Vit (Bulgarian: Вит; Latin: Utus) is a river in northern Bulgaria, a right tributary of the Danube. Its length including the main stem Beli (White) Vit is 189 km, while the river proper, formed by the confluence of the Beli and Cherni (Black) Vit is 153 km long. Vit Ice Piedmont in Antarctica is named after the river. The fish species Vit sculpin of the genus Cottus is endemic to the Vit.

== Geography ==
=== Course ===
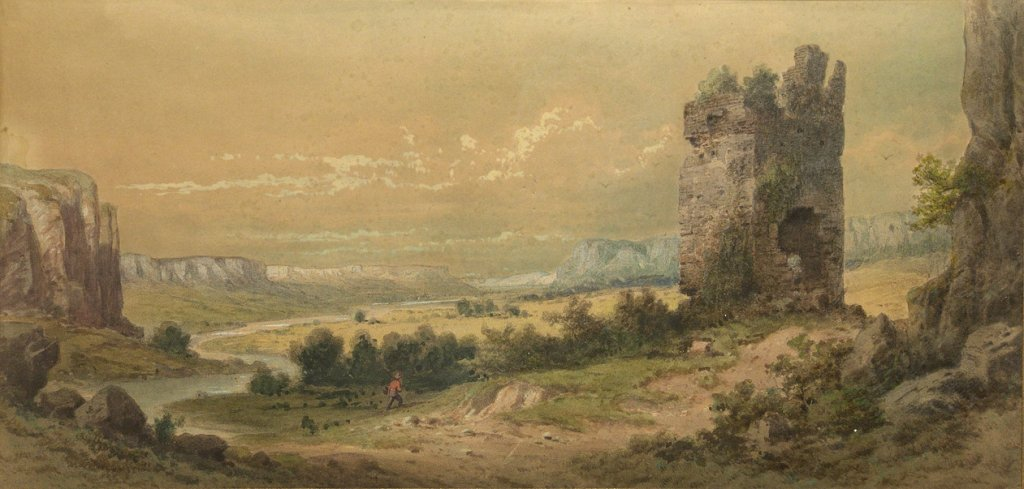
The Vit at Sadovets by Felix Philipp Kanitz

The main stem, the Beli Vit, is 36 km long and takes its source at an altitude of 1,595 m on the western foothills of the summit of Yumruka (1,819 m) at the boundary between the Zlatitsa–Teteven and the Troyan sections of the Balkan Mountains and flows in general northwest direction in a steep forested valley. The other stem, the 27 km long Cherni Vit, springs at an altitude of 1,980 m about 800 m northwest of the summit of Baba (2,070 m) in the Zlatitsa–Teteven section of the Balkan Mountains and flows north in a deep forested valley. Both upper reaches of the Vit fall within the Central Balkan National Park.

The river proper is formed by the confluence of the Beli Vit (right branch) and the Cherni Vit (left branch) at an altitude of 367 m in the town of Teteven. It flows north in a deep, forested valley between the Vasilyovska Mountain to the east and the Lisets Mountain to the west, both part of the fore-Balkan chain that runs parallel to and north of the Balkan Mountains. After the village of Glozhene, part of its waters penetrate into karst fissures and feed the largest karst spring in Bulgaria Glava Panega, which is the source of the river Zlatna Panega of the neighbouring Iskar drainage further west. The Vit then turns northeast and follows that general direction until its mouth. Between the villages of Toros and Dermantsi , its valley widens and until the village of Sadovets canyon-like ravines alternate with valley expansions. Downstream of Sadovets the Vit enters the Danubian Plain in a wide and asymmetrical valley, with steeper right slopes. It flows into the Danube at an altitude of 22 m some 1.6 km northwest of the village of Dolni Vit. From the village of Gradina to the mouth, the riverbed is corrected with water protection dikes.

=== Basin and hydrology ===
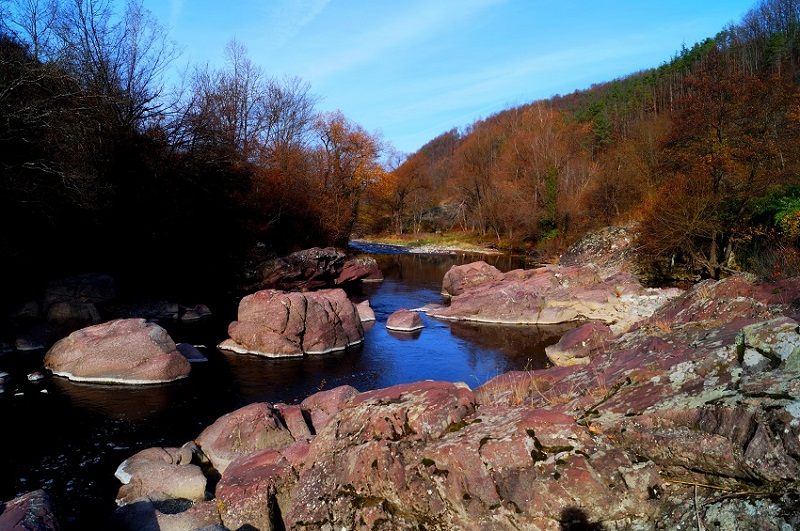
The upper course at Beli Vit

The Vit drainage basin covers a territory of 3,225 km^{2} or 0.4% of the Danube's total and borders the basins of the Iskar to the west and northwest and the Osam to the east, both of the Danube drainage, as well as the Maritsa basin to the south of the Balkan Mountain's main water divide. Its main tributaries are the Kalnik (41 km), the Kamenitsa (49 km), the Chernyalka (27 km) and the Tuchenitsa (35 km), all of them right.

The Vit has a mixed feed of snow, rain and karst waters. The importance of the snow feed increases from the north to the south, from the Danubian Plain, via the fore-Balkan to the Balkans Mountains. Underground water feed are prevalent in the fore-Balkan due to the abundance of karst springs. High water is in April–June due to the snowmelt in the mountains, leading at times to floods; low water is in August–November. The average annual discharge is 5.3 m^{3}/s at Teteven, 14.3 m^{3}/s at Sadovets and 14 m^{3}/s at Yasen. The discharge of the Cherni Vit is 3.2 m^{3}/s.

== Fauna ==
A total of 45 fish species have been recorded from the Vit, of them 42 are autochthonous. A 2007–2008 study identified 35 species and estimated that nine of the ten that were not caught during the surveys were likely occurring in the river. The predominating family by number of species is Cyprinidae. The fish found in the Vit include river trout, northern pike, common roach, European chub, ide, asp, common rudd, common bleak, riffle minnow, white bream, common bream, white-eye bream, blue bream, vimba bream, common nase, European bitterling, gudgeon, Kessler's gudgeon, Danube whitefin gudgeon, Danubian longbarbel gudgeon, common barbel, Romanian barbel, Prussian carp, crucian carp, common carp, stone loach, European weatherfish, spined loach, Balkan loach, Balkan golden loach, Bulgarian golden loach, wels catfish, European perch, zander, Eurasian ruffe, striped ruffe, Balon's ruffe, Danube streber, zingel, monkey goby and European bullhead. The Vit sculpin is a species endemic to the upper reaches of the river and specifically Beli Vit. Twenty five of the recorded fish species are of conservation importance.

== Settlements and economy ==
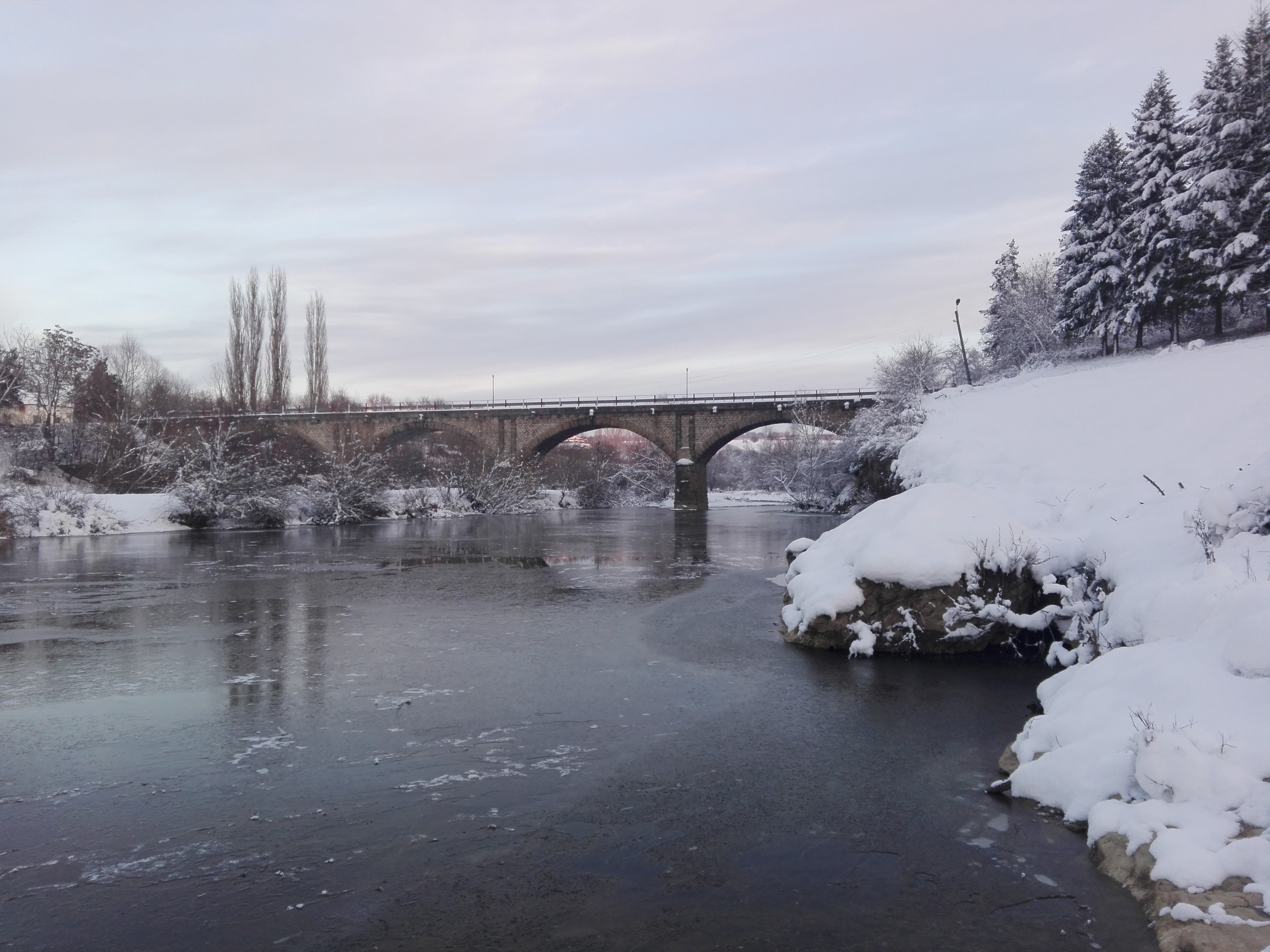
The Vit in winter at Aglen

The river flows in Lovech and Pleven Provinces. There are 19 settlements along its course, including 16 villages and three towns. The settlements in Lovech province are Teteven (town) and Glozhene in Teteven Municipality, and Toros, Dermantsi and Aglen in Lukovit Municipality. In Pleven Province, the settlements on the river are Sadovets, Krushovitsa and Gradina in Dolni Dabnik Municipality, Tarnene, Disevitsa, Yasen and Opanets in Pleven Municipality, Dolna Mitropoliya (town), Bivolare, Bozhuritsa, Riben and Komarevo in Dolna Mitropoliya Municipality, and Kreta and Gulyantsi (town) in Gulyantsi Municipality. Its waters, especially in the lower course in the Danubian Plain, are utilized for irrigation. Part of them are also diverted for industrial needs, as well as for limited electricity generation at the small Lisets Hydro Power Plant. The green Cherni Vit cheese is only produced in the homonymous village in the upper reaches of the Vit.

Along the entire length of the river valley apart from the final three kilometers at the mouth and the uppermost section of the Beli Vit pass roads of the national network, including a 33 km stretch of the third class III-358 road between the confluence with the Debelshtitsa and Glozhene, and the entire 61 km length of the third class III-305 road and 27 km length of the third class III-118 road. Near the village of Toros the river is crossed by the Hemus motorway.
