= Nikolay Kolev (journalist) =

Nikolay Kolev Николай Колев
- Born: 20 February 1932; Toros (village), Lukovit Municipality, Bulgaria
- Died: 10 June 2004 (aged 72); Sofia, Bulgaria
- Occupation: Sports Journalist

Nikolay Kolev, nicknamed Michmana (Bulgarian: Николай Колев - Мичмана) was a Bulgarian TV sports journalist. He was a symbol of Bulgarian national sports journalism, being a pioneer in the profession.

== Biography and career ==
Michmana was born on 20 February 1932 in the village of Toros in Lukovit Municipality, Lovech Province. He graduated from Sofia University with a specialty in Geography.

Nikolay Kolev started working with the Bulgarian National Television (BNT) in 1965 and from 1974 he was an editor-in-chief in the sports department. specializing in Football (soccer) commentary, Michmana was an accredited commentator on eight of the FIFA World Cup competitions, seven of the UEFA European Football Championships and nine of the Olympic Games. The UEFA Club competitions, such as the old format of the Champions League and Cup Winners' Cup, were also broadcast in Kolev's well-known mellow, slightly nasal voice. Due to his popularity as a commentator he was usually associated with the Bulgarian football championship especially when it comes to the traditional derby between Levski FC and CSKA. During his years in BNT, Kolev built up his own distinguishable style of commenting. His colourful expressions were embraced throughout the country of Bulgaria and people frequently adopted quotes from some of his commentaries in daily speech.

Memorable quotes of his are:
"...the colleague Pelé next to me..." (when the famous Brazilian footballer commented for some television in the booth next to the Kolev's)
and "...God is Bulgarian..." (when Kostadinov scored a crucial goal in the last minute of the match between France and Bulgaria that qualified the Bulgarian team for the 1994 FIFA World Cup).

After leaving Bulgarian National Television, in the mid 1990s, Michmana worked for a while with Diema vision. In honor of Kolev, Diema established an annual award for journalism, named after him. The first prize winner is Kalin Katev, another popular Bulgarian sports journalist who worked for the Bulgarian National Radio.

Nikolay Kolev died in 2004 at the age of 72.
