= Tuchenitsa =

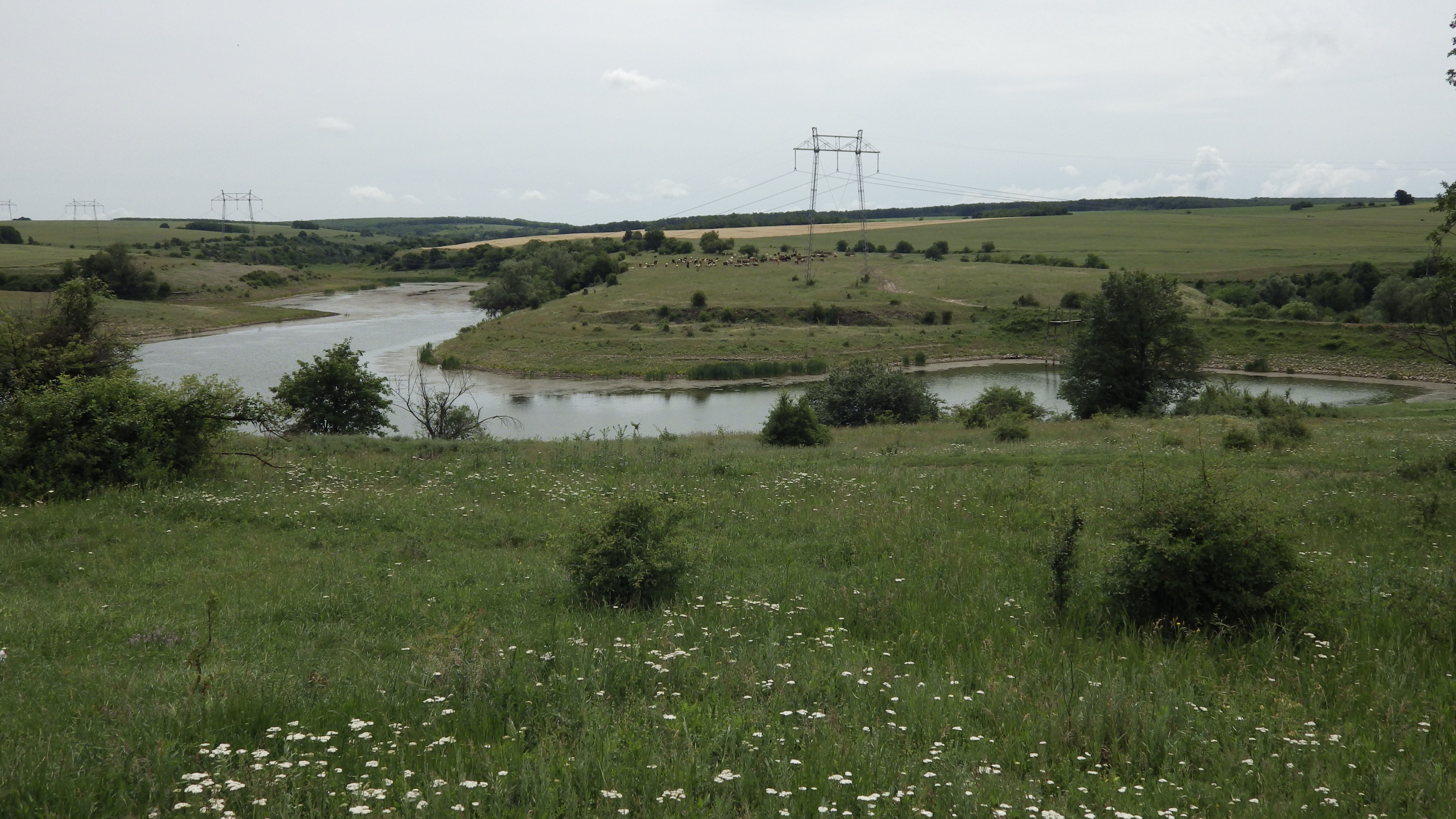

Location
- Country: Bulgaria

Physical characteristics
- Source
  - location: N of Slatina, Danubian Plain
  - coordinates: 43°16′24.96″N 24°44′18.96″E
  - elevation: 359 m (1,178 ft)
- Mouth
  - location: Vit
  - coordinates: 43°27′14.04″N 24°33′24.12″E
  - elevation: 52 m (171 ft)
- Length: 35 km (22 mi)

Basin features
- Progression: Vit→ Danube→ Black Sea

The Tuchenitsa (Bulgarian: Тученица), also known as the Plevenska Bara or Barata in its lower course, is a 35 km-long river in northern Bulgaria, a right tributary of the river Vit, itself a right tributary of the Danube.

The Tuchenitsa takes its source in the Slatinski Venets Height of the Danubian Plain at an altitude of 359 m, some 1.7 km north of the village of Slatina. It flows north, gradually bending to the northwest, then turns west and northwest downstream of the village of Tuchenitsa, crossing the Pleven Heights. Between the village and city of Pleven the river forms a beautiful karst gorge, part of the Kaylaka park and protected area. There are two small dams on the river within the park. The riverbank within Pleven is entirely channelized. Its waters feed the major water cascades in the city center. The Tuchenitsa flows into the Vit at an altitude of 52 m at the village of Opanets.

The principal feed of the Tuchenitsa is formed by rain, snow and karst waters, with high water in March–June and low water in July–October.

The river flows in Lovech and Pleven Provinces. Along its course are located the major city of Pleven and the villages of Tuchenitsa and Opanets, all of them in Pleven Municipality. Its waters are utilized for irrigation.
