= Dragana =

Dragana may refer to:

- Dragana (given name), a female given name
- Dragana, Bulgaria, a village in Ugarchin Municipality
