= Golets =

Golets may refer to:

- Golets (geography), a type of mountain summit
- Golets, Bulgaria, a village in Bulgaria
- Arctic char
