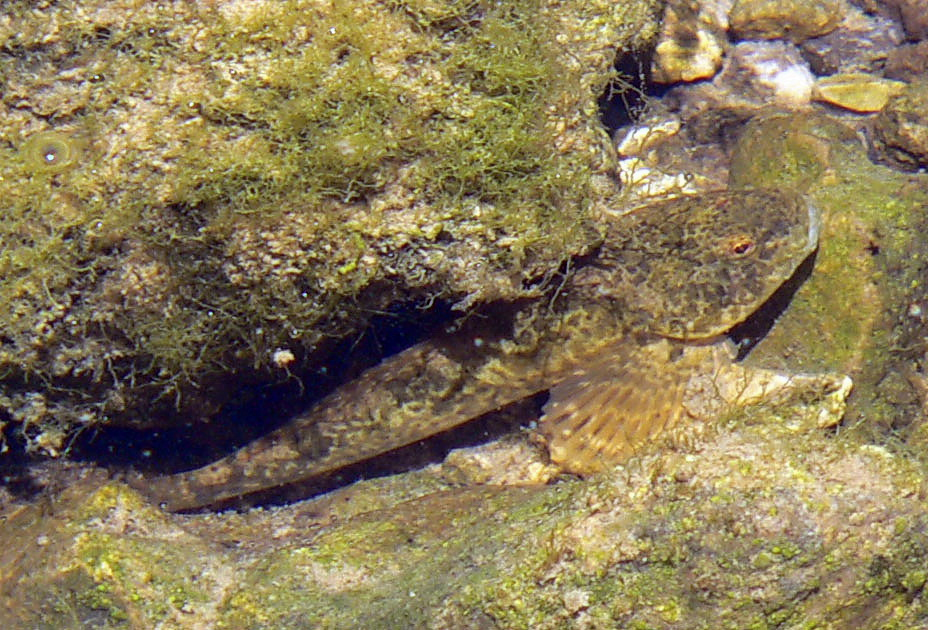

Conservation status
- Least Concern (IUCN 3.1)

Scientific classification
- Kingdom: Animalia
- Phylum: Chordata
- Class: Actinopterygii
- Order: Perciformes
- Suborder: Cottoidei
- Family: Cottidae
- Genus: Cottus
- Species: C. gobio

Binomial name
- Cottus gobio Linnaeus, 1758

Synonyms
- Cottus gobio gobio Linnaeus, 1758; Cottus affinis Heckel, 1837; Cottus ferrugineus Bonaparte, 1846; Cottus ferrugineus Heckel & Kner, 1858; Cottus gobio macrostomus Jeitteles, 1863; Cottus gobio jaxartensis Berg, 1916; Cottus jaxartensis Berg, 1916; Cottus gobio roseus Odenwall, 1927; Cottus gobio pellegrini Vladykov, 1931; Cottus gobio pellegrini Băcescu & Băcescu-Mester, 1964

= European bullhead =

Species of fish

The European bullhead (Cottus gobio) is a freshwater fish that is widely distributed in Europe, mainly in rivers. It is a member of the family Cottidae, a type of sculpin. It is also known as the miller's thumb, freshwater sculpin, common bullhead, and cob.

The European bullhead is a small demersal fish that lives both in cold, clear, fast-flowing small streams and in middle-sized rivers. It also occurs on gravelly shores of cold lakes. Further, it thrives in diluted brackish water of the Northern Baltic Sea.

== Description ==
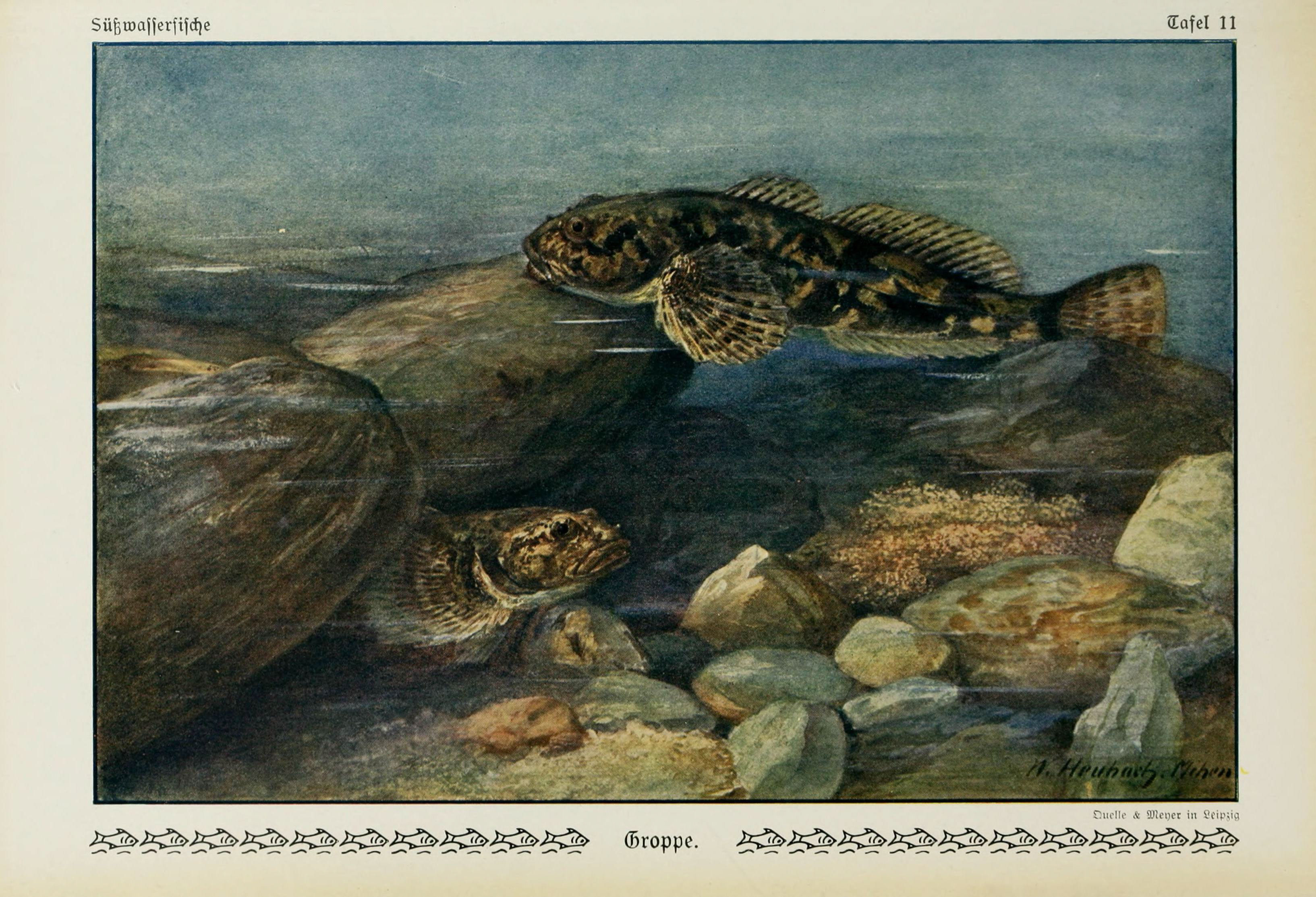
European bullhead on stamp

The bullhead has a large broad head and tapering body, large fins and a rounded tail. The eyes are located near the top of the head. To the distinction from the other freshwater sculpin species found in Northern Europe, it can be told from the alpine bullhead Cottus poecilopus by the fact that the rays of its pelvic fins are of similar lengths while the first and last rays are longer in the alpine bullhead. It can be distinguished from the fourhorn sculpin by the fact that the dorsal and anal fins terminate close to the tail giving a short caudal peduncle. When it rests on the bottom, the pectoral fins flare out resembling wings. The bullhead is usually about 6 to 8 cm (2.4 to 3.1 in) long and is light brown mottled with darker colour. The pelvic fins are colourless and lack the stripes of the alpine bullhead.

== Biology ==
Food items eaten by the bullhead include benthic insects, crustaceans and other invertebrates. It breeds in the spring. The male digs a shallow hollow in which batches of eggs are deposited by several females. He then guards the nest for the month or so that it takes for the eggs to hatch.

== Systematics and distribution ==
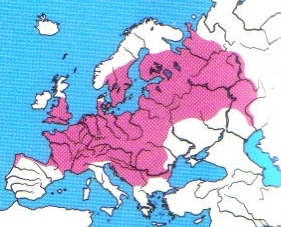
Total distribution of the Cottus gobio complex

The European bullhead, as treated above, is widespread over most of the subcontinent and in the UK, but absent from the southern peninsulae and from Northern Scandinavia. It is not a single uniform taxon, however, but composed of morphologically and genetically differentiated subunits. Some of those have been distinguished already long time ago as separate subspecies or species with their own names, while in practice they have still mostly been treated under the concept of Cottus gobio. In 2005, Freyhof et al. suggested subdivision of the European Cottus gobio into fourteen distinct species, of which six had been described earlier and eight were newly described and named.

- Cottus aturi - France (Adour)
- Cottus duranii - France (upper Dordogne, Loire etc.)
- Cottus gobio sensu stricto - Germany, Sweden, Central Europe
- Cottus haemusi - Bulgaria (Beli Vit of Danube basin)
- Cottus hispaniolensis - France, Spain (Garonne)
- Cottus koshewnikowi - Northeast Europe
- Cottus metae - Danube drainage (Sava)
- Cottus microstomus - East Central Europe: Poland, Slovakia, Ukraine etc.
- Cottus perifretum - Great Britain, Netherlands, Germany, France
- Cottus petiti - France (Lez)
- Cottus rhenanus - Netherlands, Germany
- Cottus rondeleti - France (Hérault)
- Cottus scaturigo - Italy (Trieste, local)
- Cottus transsilvaniae - Romania (Argeș of Danube basin)

Additionally, Cottus ferrugineus is said to occupy Italy and the Balkans, but this taxon is considered invalid.

For instance, in this classification the British bullhead are Cottus perifretum. In common usage in the UK, especially by conservation authorities, they are still mostly treated as Cottus gobio.
