= Kirchevo =

Kirchevo Кирчево
- Village
- Location within Bulgaria
- Coordinates: 42.9833°N 24.3667°E
- Country: Bulgaria
- Province: Lovech Province
- Municipality: Ugarchin
- Time zone: UTC+2 (EET)
  - Summer (DST): UTC+3 (EEST)

Kirchevo is a village in Ugarchin Municipality, Lovech Province, northern Bulgaria. The city has a very small population and the closest major cities include Sofia, Plovdiv, Craiova and Bucharest.
