= Orlyane =

Orlyane Орляне
- Village
- Location within Bulgaria
- Coordinates: 43.1000°N 24.5000°E
- Country: Bulgaria
- Province: Lovech Province
- Municipality: Ugarchin
- Time zone: UTC+2 (EET)
  - Summer (DST): UTC+3 (EEST)

Orlyane is a village in Ugarchin Municipality, Lovech Province, northern Bulgaria.
