= Kalenik =

Kalenik Каленик
- Village
- Location within Bulgaria
- Coordinates: 43°09′30″N 24°30′35″E
- Country: Bulgaria
- Province: Lovech Province
- Municipality: Ugarchin
- Time zone: UTC+2 (EET)
  - Summer (DST): UTC+3 (EEST)

Kalenik is a village in Ugarchin Municipality, Lovech Province, northern Bulgaria.
