= Emen, Bulgaria =

Village in Bulgaria

Coordinates: 43°08′N 25°21′E

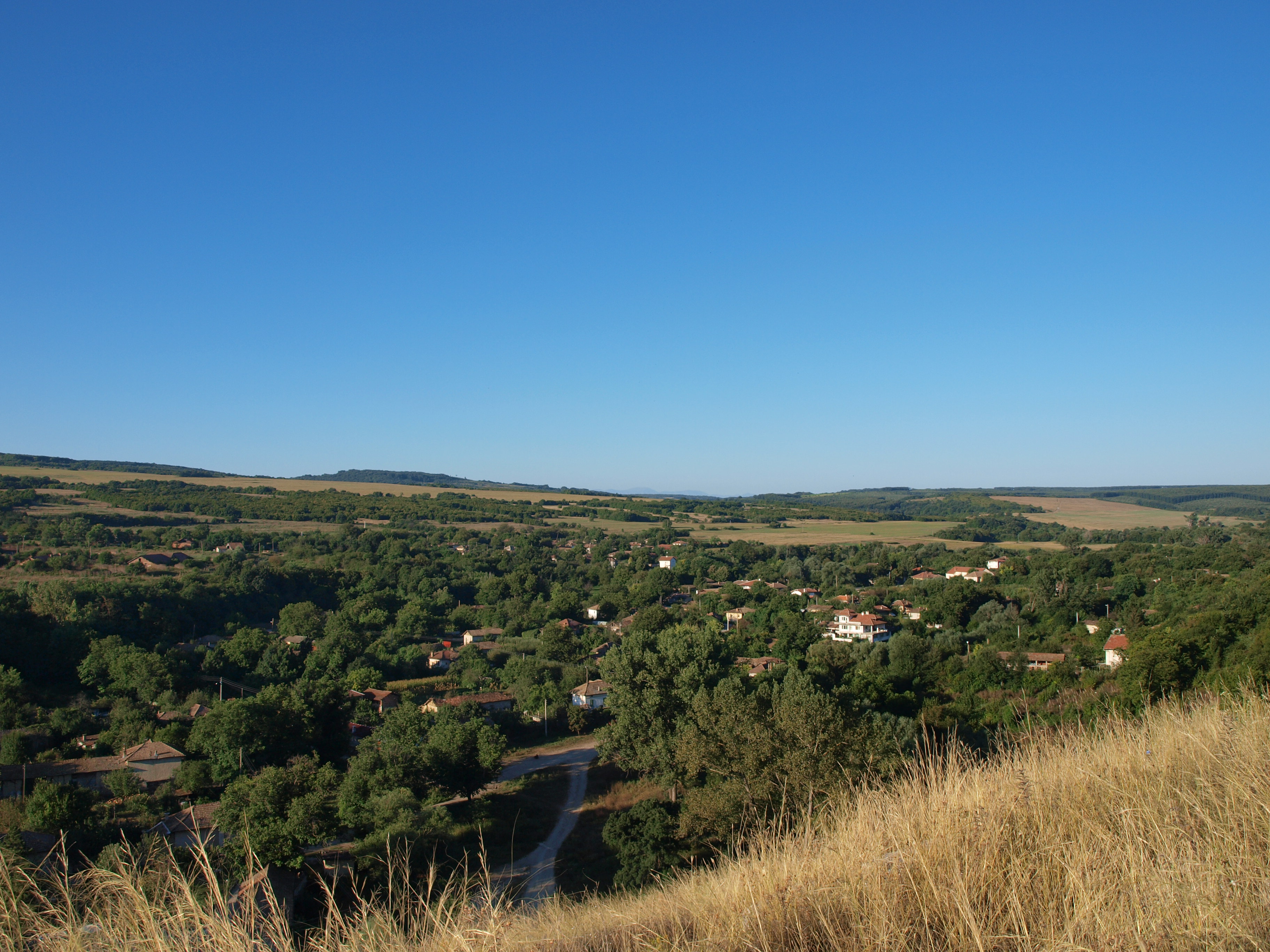
Emen from Kaleto hill.

Emen (Bulgarian: Емен [ˈɛmɛn]) is a village in Veliko Tarnovo Municipality, Veliko Tarnovo Province, Bulgaria, famous for the nearby caves and canyon. In recent years it has become a major tourist destination, receiving both domestic and foreign visitors. Emen's population is about 100 people, but it triples during the summer.

== History ==
The Emen cave bears evidence of human habitation, dated to the Neolith. Later, Romans settled in the area and built an outpost on Kaleto hill on the verge of the present-day village. Fortifications included a rock wall from two sides, while the other two sides were naturally protected by the vertical walls of the Emen canyon. Nowadays, parts of the wall are preserved, but treasure-hunter raids have reduced archaeological evidence.

The present-day name of the village is said to derive from the times of the Ottoman rule over Bulgaria. Emen was the name of the Turk who owned all the land and Christian people of the village. With the Liberation of Bulgaria he was most likely expelled from the country, but the village kept its name. Today, a single Turkish family lives in Emen, but it bears no relation to the previous landowner.

== Geography and natural sights ==
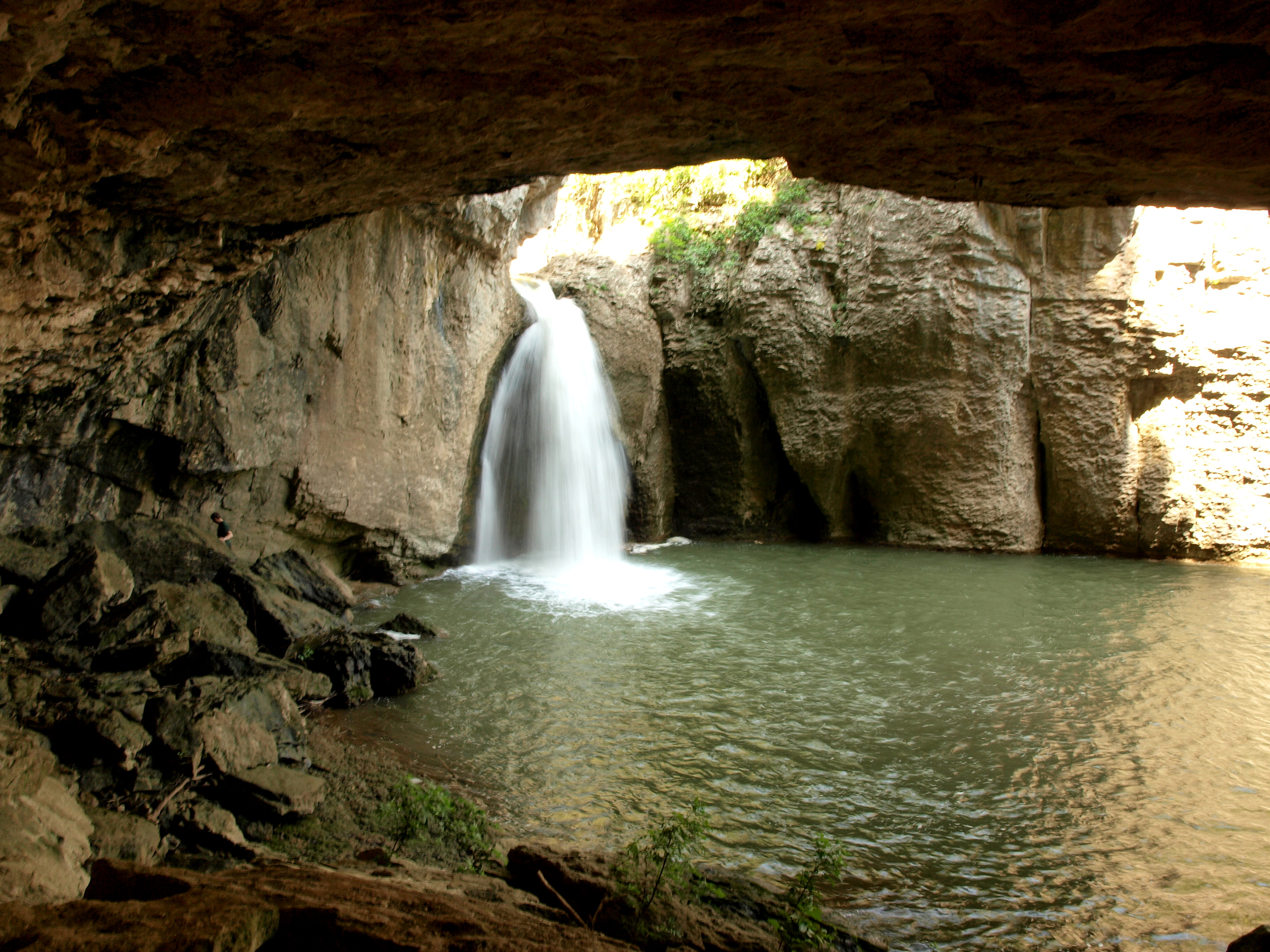
The Emen (Momin Skok) waterfall

Emen is located in Veliko Tarnovo Province, about 20 km away from capital of the province. The river Negovanka, a tributary of the Rositsa flows right through the village, through the Emen Canyon and ends up in the Mihaltsi dam situated about 5 km north of the village. The name of the river comes from Latin and means short river with a near source. In Palaeolithic times, the river carved a gorge (or canyon), which bears the name of the village. The Emen Canyon consists of two parts, called Goren (Upper) and Dolen (Lower) Boaz. The Upper Boaz stretches through 5 km from the nearby village of Novo Selo to Emen, itself. The Lower part of the canyon begins in the north part of Emen and eventually opens up after the Mihaltsi dam.

The Emen Canyon was declared a Natural Monument in 1980. As a result, some human activities like lumbering and driving motor vehicles are prohibited on the 25.5-hectare (63-acre) area of the Natural Monument. It partially overlaps with another Natural Monument - the Momin Skok one, which encompasses a small area around the waterfall of the same name.

One of the first eco paths in Bulgaria passes through the Emen Gorge on its way to the Momin Skok Waterfall. The Emen cave is located at the very beginning of the eco path. With its length of 3,113 meters, it is the 17th longest cave in Bulgaria. This has made it suitable for many human activities throughout the years. It has consecutively been used to grow mushrooms and mature cheese. In Communist times it even became an arms depot of a military base located immediately above it. Currently, human presence in the cave is, at least officially, restricted to allow for bats to breed uninterrupted. Bat species inhabiting the cave include: greater horseshoe bat, Blasius's horseshoe bat, Mediterranean horseshoe bat, common bent-wing bat, greater and lesser mouse-eared bat.

Speleologists from Ruse have discovered a large cave system in the vicinity of the village during expeditions between 1986 and 1991. The caves Ruse (3,306 metres long), Troana (3,234 m) and Bambalova Dupka (2,923 m) are all located in the Lower Boaz.
