= Musina, Bulgaria =

Musina Мусина
- Village
- Location within Bulgaria
- Coordinates: 43°09′25″N 25°18′00″E
- Country: Bulgaria
- Province: Veliko Tarnovo
- Community: Pavlikeni

Area
  - Total: 23,394 km^{2} (9,032 sq mi)
- Elevation: 233 m (764 ft)

Population (2)
  - Total: 240
  - Density: 0.010/km^{2} (0.027/sq mi)
- Time zone: UTC+2 (EET)
  - Summer (DST): UTC+3 (EEST)
- Post code: 5247
- Area code: 061397

Musina is a village in the Veliko Tarnovo Province of northern Bulgaria.

== Geography ==
Musina is located in the central Danubian Plain, near the Balkan Mountains (Stara Planina). It is 21 kilometres (13 mi) from Veliko Tarnovo, 17 kilometres (11 mi) from Pavlikeni, and 12 kilometres (7.5 mi) from Byala Cherkva. In the area of the village are two rivers: Negovanka and Peshterska.

== History ==
Romans used a cave near Musina to supply fresh water to Nicopolis ad Istrum. Around the 12th century the village were town with Bulgarians.

According to the legend in the area Voditsa were lived the mother of Ivan Shishman of Bulgaria. Bee-eater from the village of Musina, painted the medieval fortress Tsarevets in a church mine. The mine was discovered by Dr. Maslev in Brasov and the fortress was restored by the paint. The monastery school in Musina was created in 1790, which is one of the first schools in the villages in Veliko Tarnovo Province. From Musina are dozens of revolutionaries who participated in the army of Bacho Kiro and Pop Hariton. In Musina swords were made for the army.

== Gallery ==
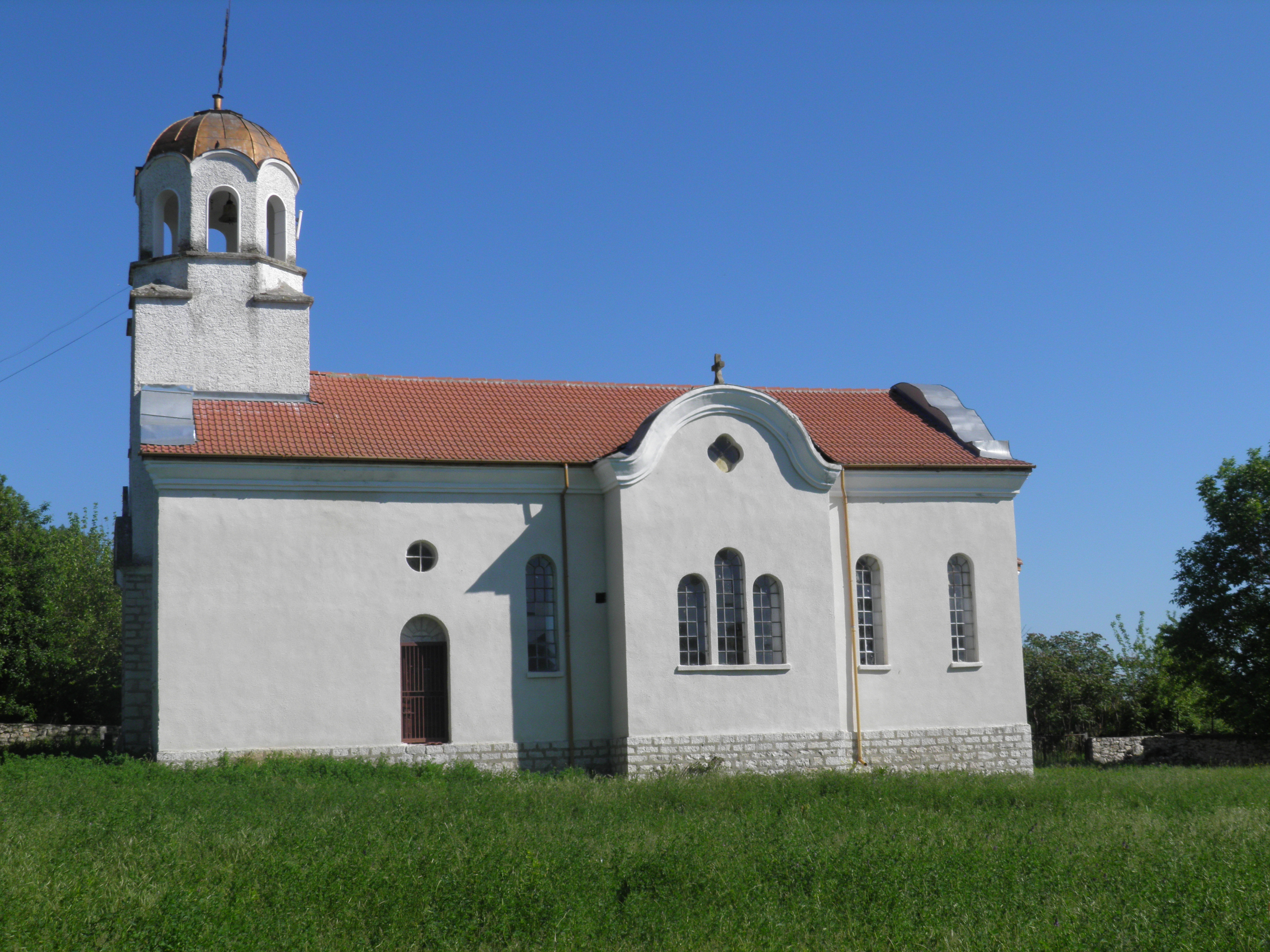
Orthodox Church Saint Paraskeva

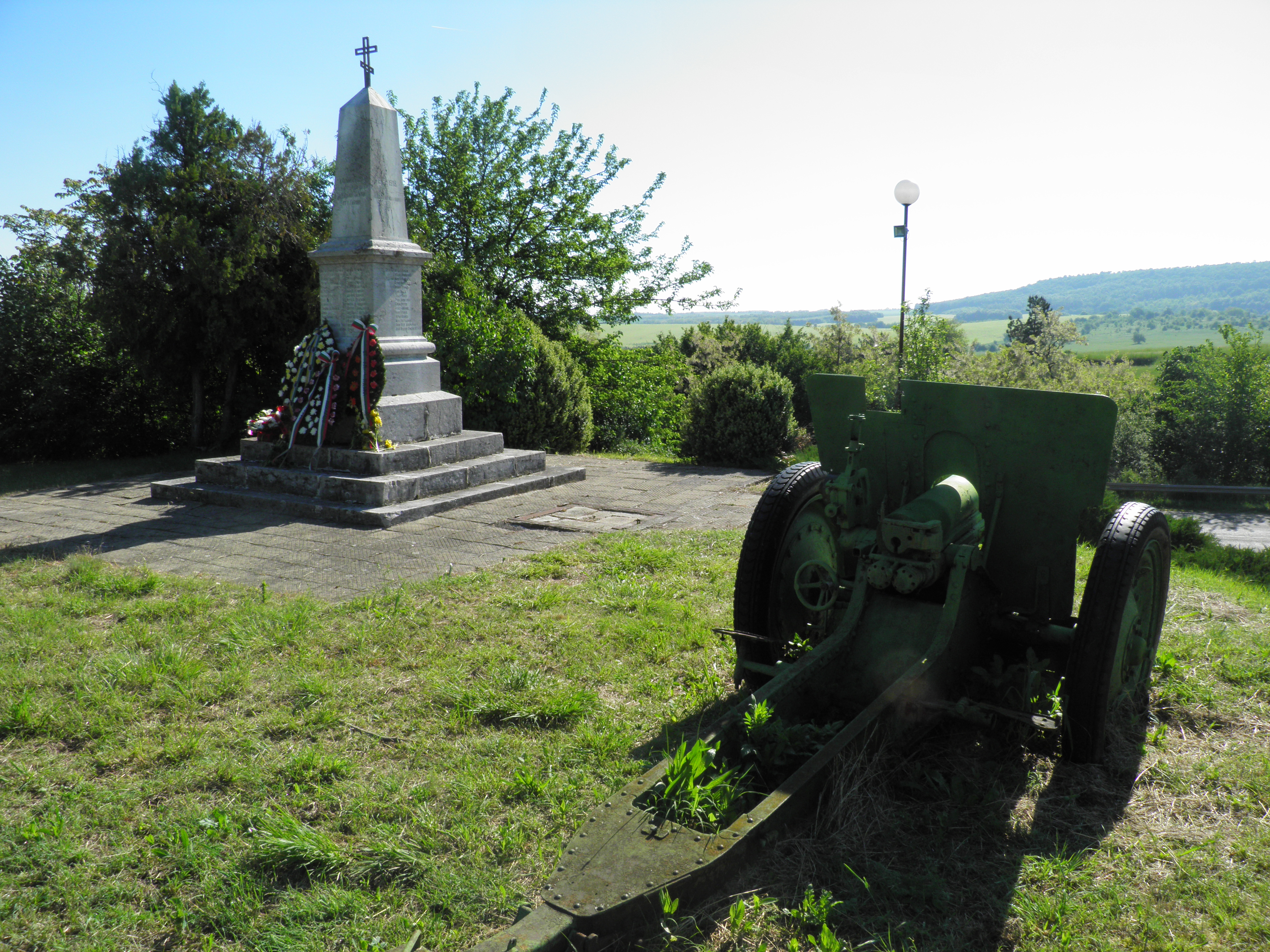
Monument

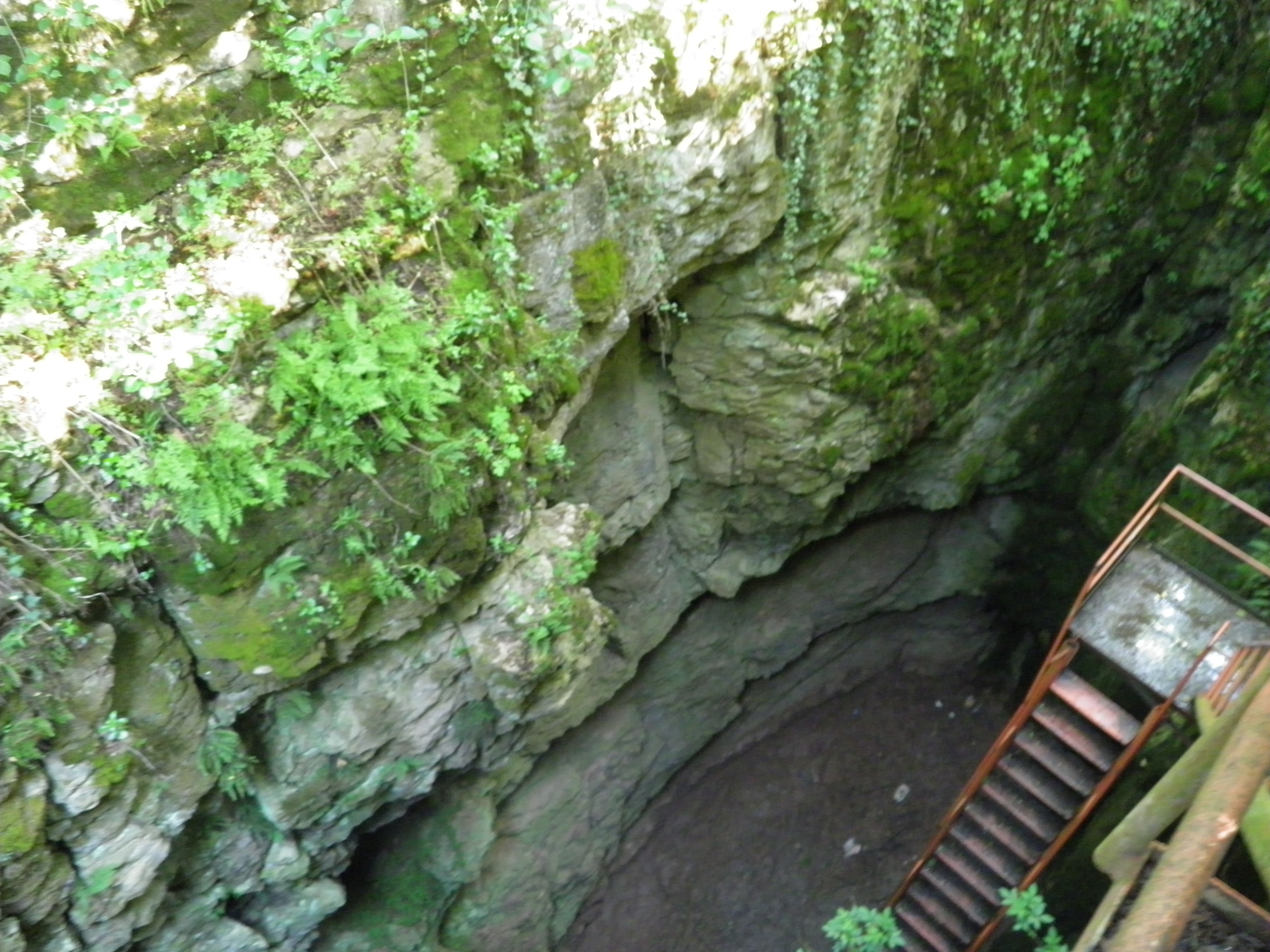
Propastite area

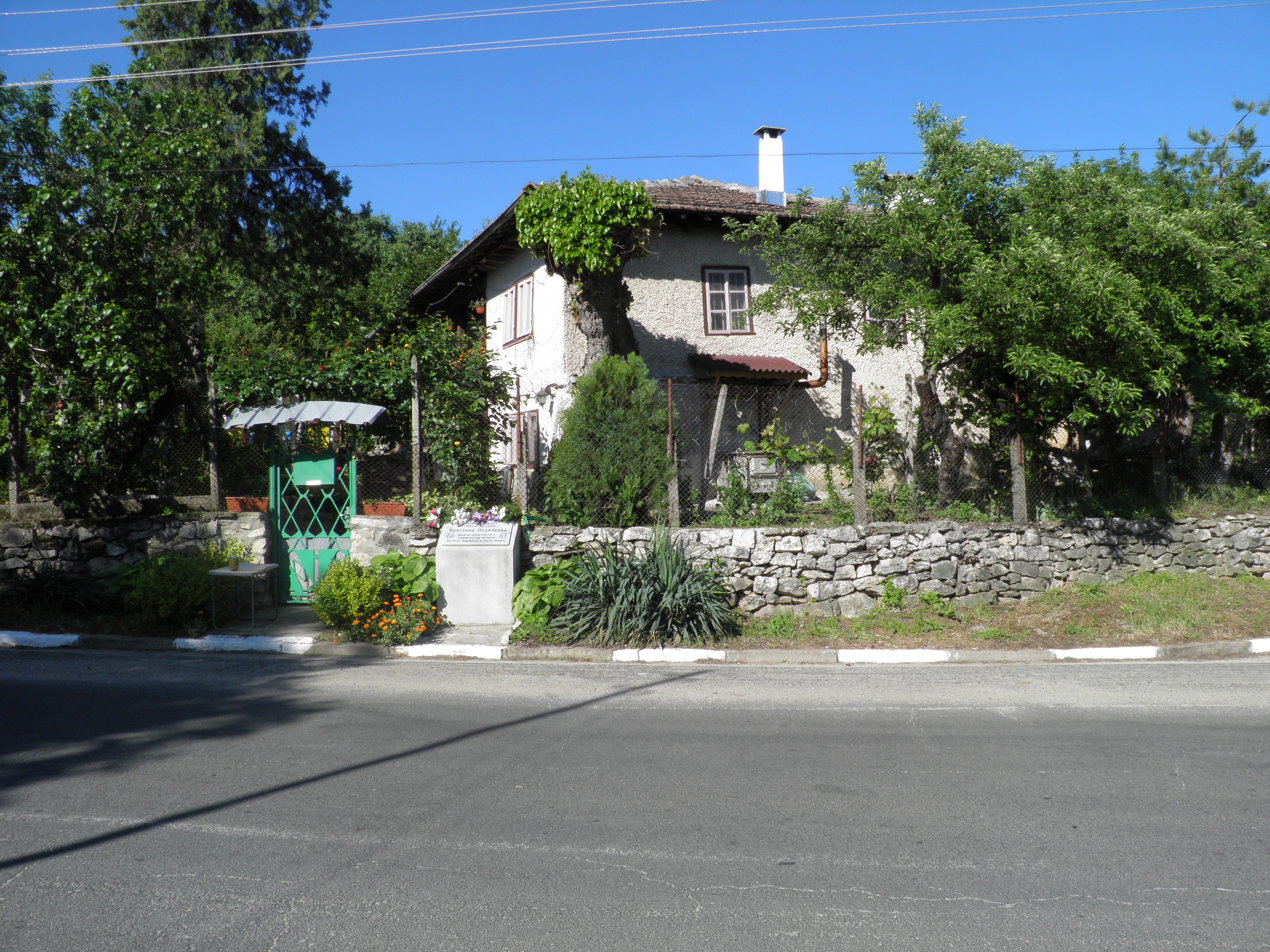
Krastina Nedyalkova's house
