= Lesidren =

Lesidren Лесидрен
- Village
- Location within Bulgaria
- Coordinates: 42.9667°N 24.4000°E
- Country: Bulgaria
- Province: Lovech Province
- Municipality: Ugarchin
- Time zone: UTC+2 (EET)
  - Summer (DST): UTC+3 (EEST)

Lesidren is a village in Ugarchin Municipality, Lovech Province, northern Bulgaria.
