= Negovanka =

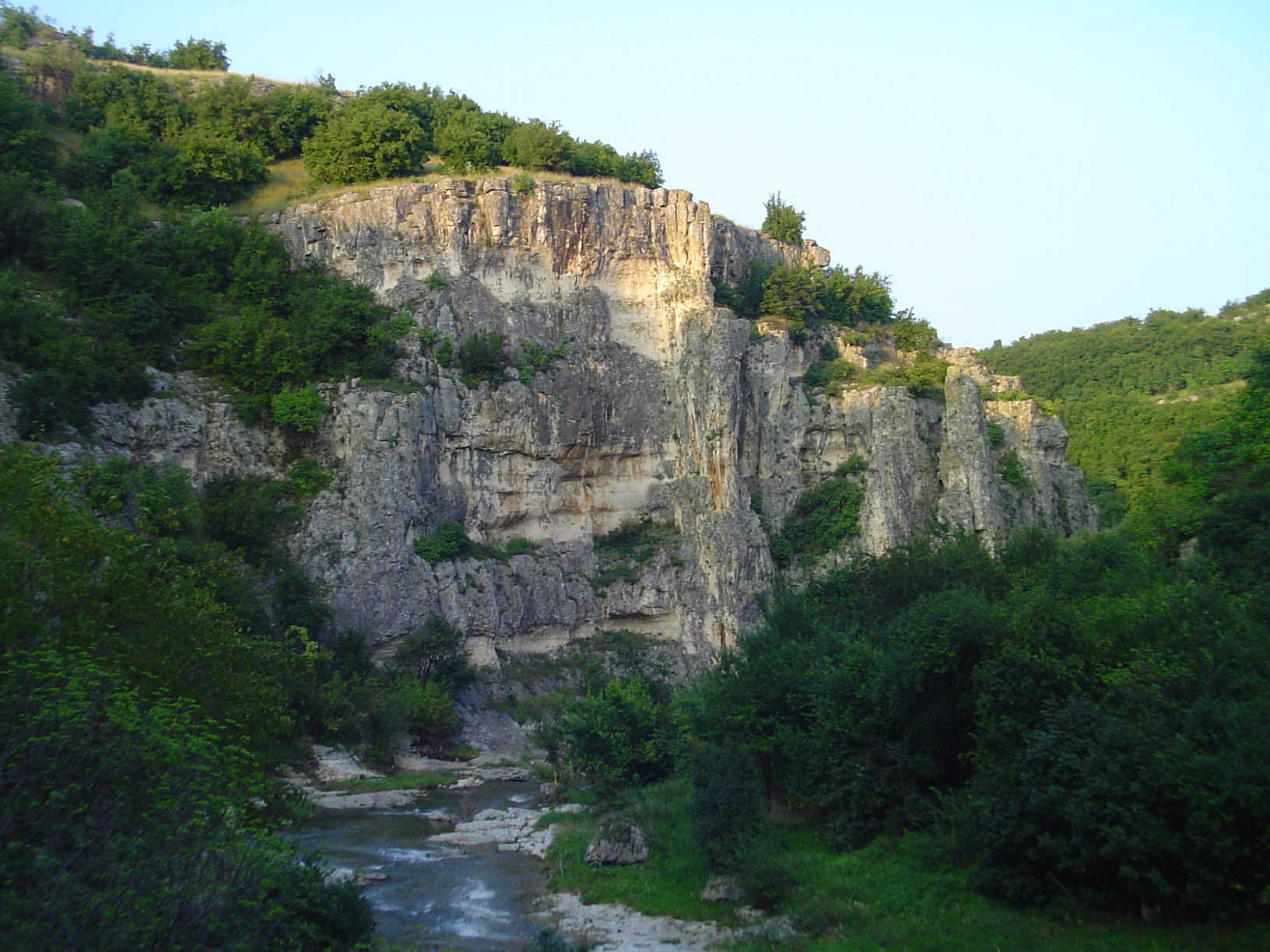

Location
- Country: Bulgaria

Physical characteristics
- Source
  - location: SE of Idilevo, Fore-Balkan
  - coordinates: 43°1′21″N 25°16′23.16″E
  - elevation: 520 m (1,710 ft)
- Mouth
  - location: Rositsa
  - coordinates: 43°12′38.88″N 25°32′29.04″E
  - elevation: 67 m (220 ft)
- Length: 46 km (29 mi)
- Basin size: 173 km^{2} (67 sq mi)

Basin features
- Progression: Rositsa→ Yantra→ Danube→ Black Sea

The Negovanka (Bulgarian: Негованка) is a 46 km-long river in northern Bulgaria, a right tributary of the Rositsa, itself a left tributary of the river Yantra of the Danube basin. It is the second longest tributary of the Rositsa after the Vidima.

The Negovanka takes its source from a spring at an altitude of 520 m some 1.8 km southeast of the village of Idilevo in the fore-Balkan. The karst spring northwest of Novo Selo is also an important source of water. The river flows north in a deep valley and close to the village of Emen forms the Emen Canyon in Aptian limestones from the Early Cretaceous, which has been declared a natural monument. Downstream of the canyon the Negovanka turns northeast, its valley widens and the river eventually flows into the Rositsa at an altitude of 67 m.

Its drainage basin covers a territory of 173 km^{2} or 7.6% of the Rositsa's total.

About 33% of the feed is formed by spring water, 50% by rain and 17% by snow. High water is in February–May and low water in August–September. In winter the river may freeze for 20–30 days in January and February and in particularly dry summers it may dry up for 15–40 days. Its water temperature fluctuates more in comparison to other rivers in the region, varying between 0 °С and 23.2 °С.

The river flows in Gabrovo and Veliko Tarnovo Provinces. There are four villages along its course, all of them in Veliko Tarnovo Province: Emen, Rusalya and Resen in Veliko Tarnovo Municipality, and Musina in Pavlikeni Municipality. Its waters are utilized for irrigation.
