= Chernyalka =

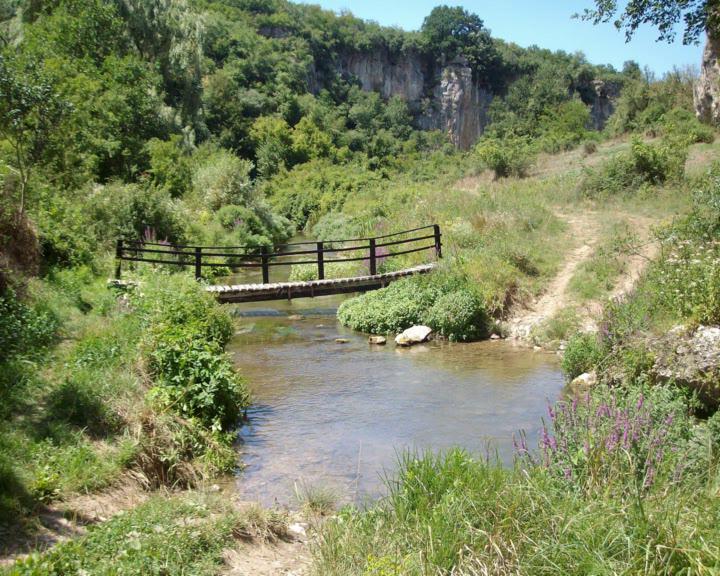

Location
- Country: Bulgaria

Physical characteristics
- Source
  - location: NW of Lisets, Danubian Plain
  - coordinates: 43°11′24″N 24°37′44.04″E
  - elevation: 425 m (1,394 ft)
- Mouth
  - location: Vit
  - coordinates: 43°23′36.96″N 24°30′24.12″E
  - elevation: 66 m (217 ft)
- Length: 27 km (17 mi)

Basin features
- Progression: Vit→ Danube→ Black Sea

The Chernyalka (Bulgarian: Чернялка) is a 27 km-long river in northern Bulgaria, a right tributary of the river Vit, itself a right tributary of the Danube.

The Chernyalka takes its source in the Danubian Plain at an altitude of 425 m, some 1.5 km northwest of the village of Lisets. It flows north to the village of Ralevo and then bends in direction northwest, flowing through a karst gorge with steep, at places vertical slopes. The river cuts through the southernmost parts of the Pleven Heights, built of Upper Cretaceous limestones and clay–sandy rocks. The section between the villages of Gortalovo and Kartozhabene is particularly picturesque. In 1969, the entire length of the 28 km gorge with an area of 4.492 km^{2} was declared a natural landmark. The river flows into the Vit at an altitude of 66 m at the village of Tarnene.

The principal feed is formed by karst waters, with high water in March–June and low water in July–October.

The river flows in Lovech and Pleven Provinces. There are six villages along its course: Nikolaevo, Laskar, Ralevo, Gortalovo, Kartozhabene and Tarnene, all of them in Pleven Municipality. Its waters are utilized for irrigation.

== Gallery ==
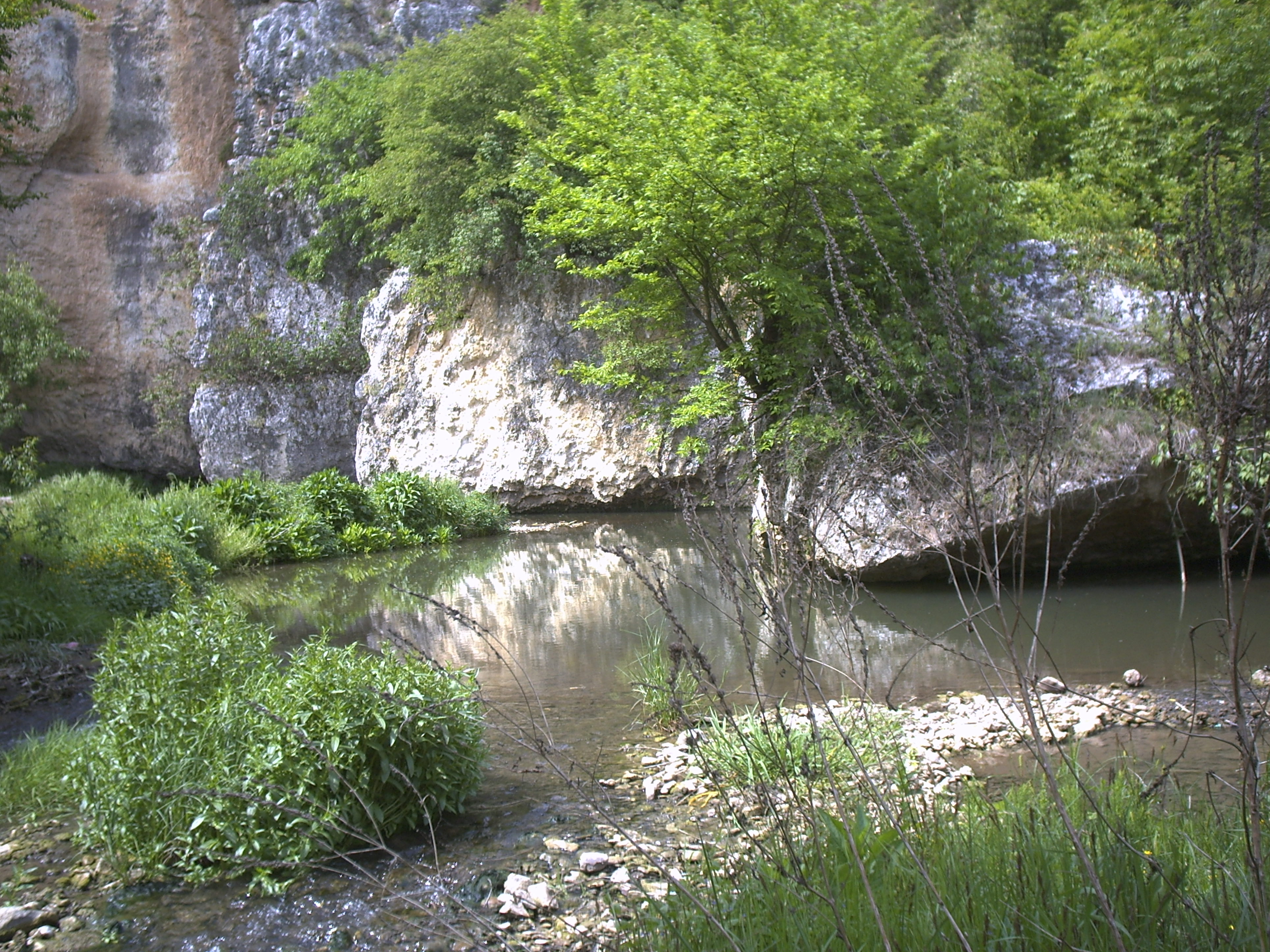

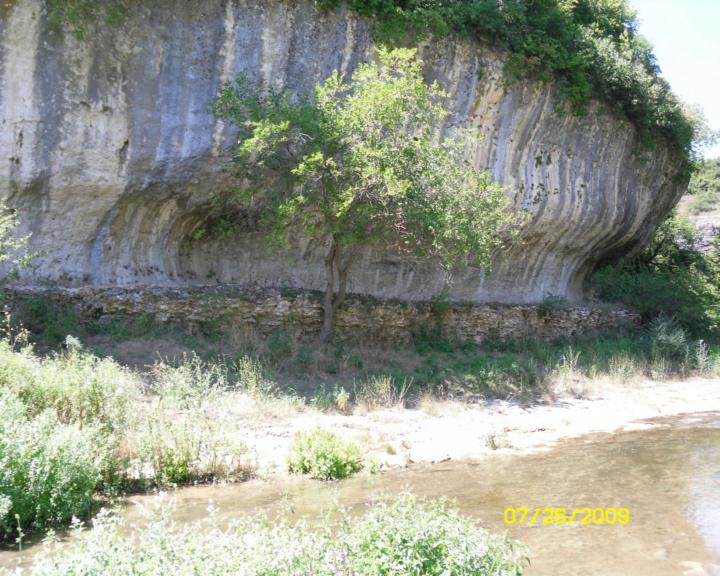

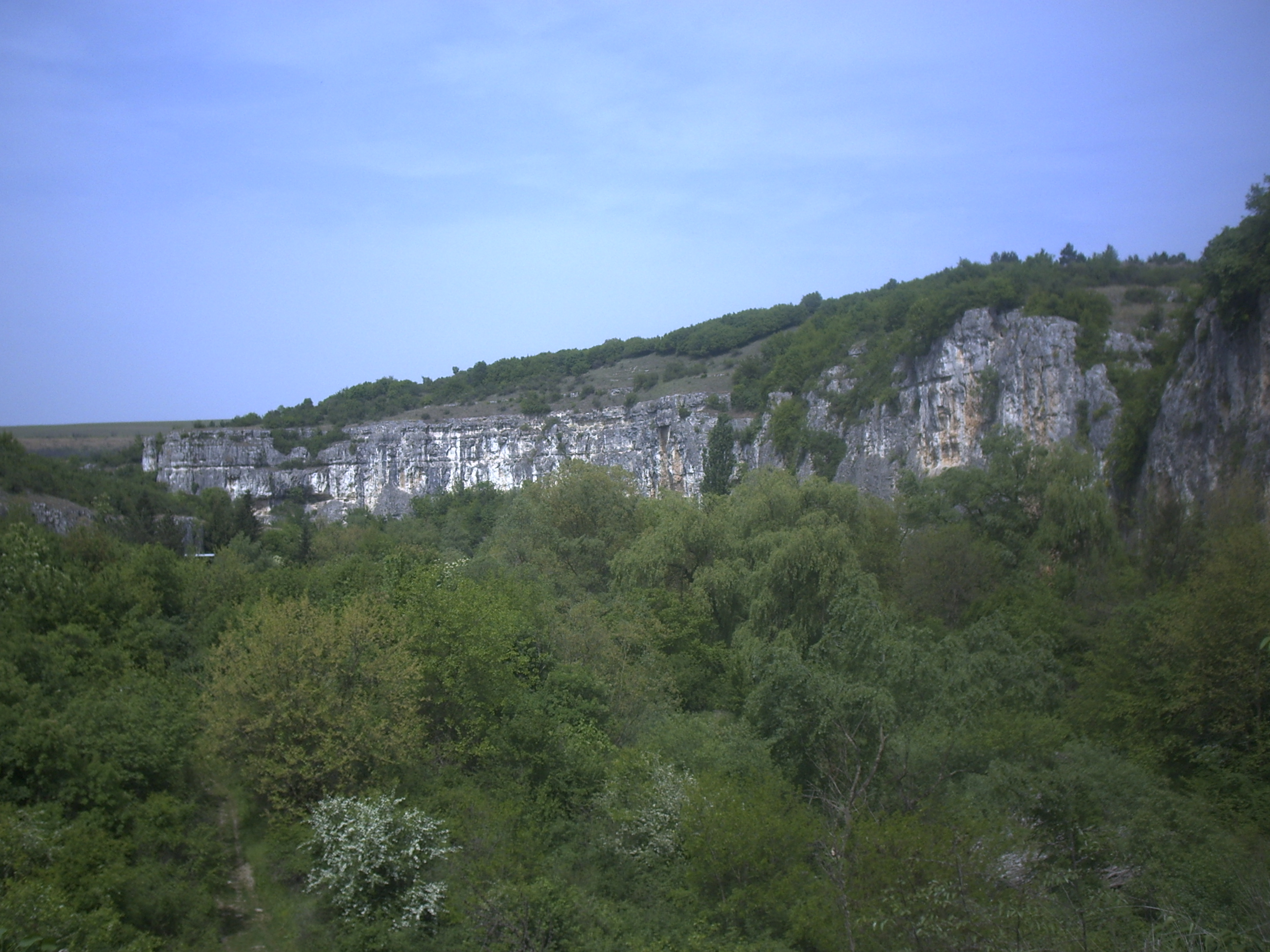
