= Dermantsi =

Dermantsi Дерманци
- Village
- Location within Bulgaria
- Coordinates: 43.1500°N 24.2833°E
- Country: Bulgaria
- Province: Lovech Province
- Municipality: Lukovit
- Time zone: UTC+2 (EET)
  - Summer (DST): UTC+3 (EEST)

Dermantsi is a village in Lukovit Municipality, Lovech Province, northern Bulgaria.
