= Slavshtitsa =

Slavshtitsa Славщица
- Village
- Location within Bulgaria
- Coordinates: 43.0500°N 24.3333°E
- Country: Bulgaria
- Province: Lovech Province
- Municipality: Ugarchin
- Time zone: UTC+2 (EET)
  - Summer (DST): UTC+3 (EEST)

Slavshtitsa (Bulgarian: Славщица [ˈsɫafʃtit͡sɐ]) is a village in Ugarchin Municipality, Lovech Province, northern Bulgaria.
