= Ugarchin Municipality =

Ugarchin Municipality Община Угърчин
- Municipality
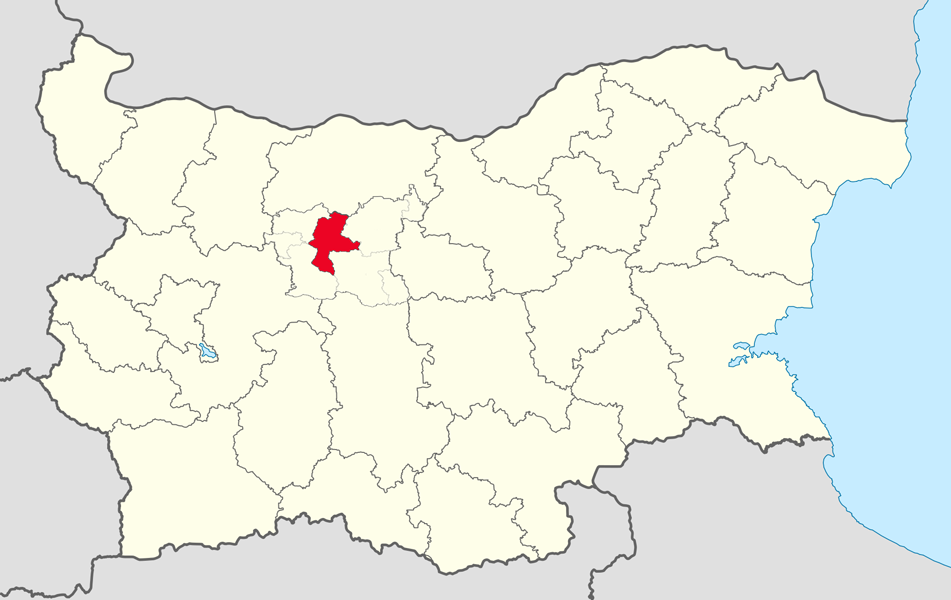
- Ugarchin Municipality within Bulgaria and Lovech Province.
- Coordinates: 43°06′N 24°25′E
- Country: Bulgaria
- Province (Oblast): Lovech
- Admin. centre (Obshtinski tsentar): Ugarchin

Area
  - Total: 523.10 km^{2} (201.97 sq mi)

Population (December 2009)
  - Total: 7,181
  - Density: 13.73/km^{2} (35.55/sq mi)
- Time zone: UTC+2 (EET)
  - Summer (DST): UTC+3 (EEST)

Ugarchin Municipality (Bulgarian: Община Угърчин) is a municipality (obshtina) in Lovech Province, Central-North Bulgaria, located from the area of the so-called Fore-Balkan to the Danubian Plain. It is named after its administrative centre - the town of Ugarchin.

The municipality embraces a territory of 523.10 km^{2} (201.97 sq mi) with a population of 7,181 inhabitants, as of December 2009.

== Settlements ==
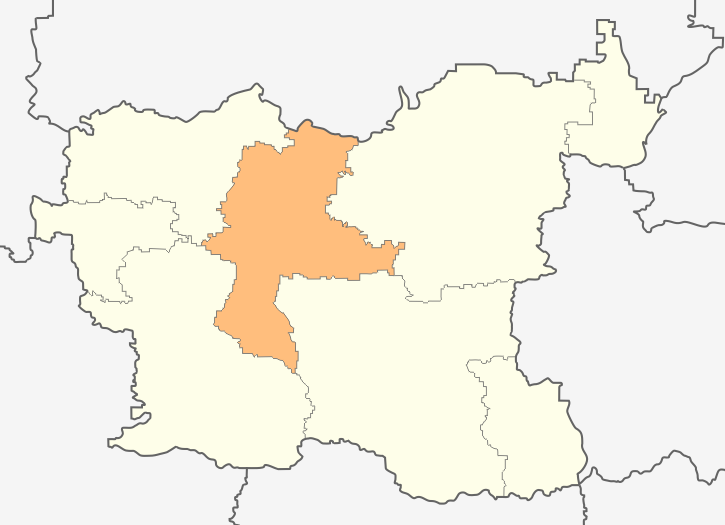
Ugarchin Municipality within Lovech Province

1. Dragana (Драгана)
2. Golets (Голец)
3. Kalenik (Каленик)
4. Katunets (Катунец)
5. Kirchevo (Кирчево)
6. Lesidren (Лесидрен)
7. Mikre (Микре)
8. Orlyane (Орляне)
9. Slavshtitsa (Славщица)
10. Sopot (Сопот)
11. Ugarchin (Угърчин)

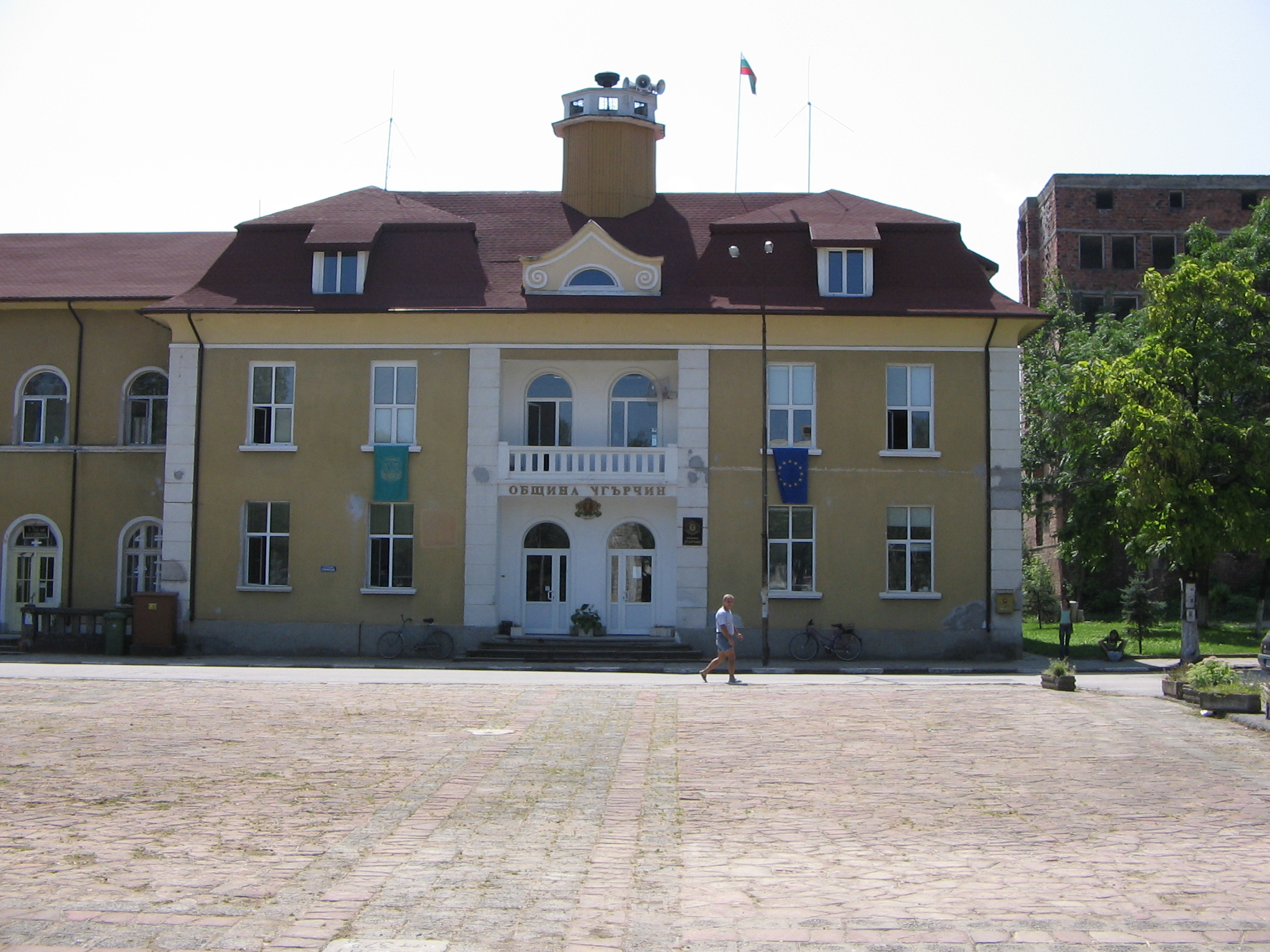
Ugarchin municipality hall

== Demography ==
The following table shows the change of the population during the last four decades.

Ugarchin Municipality
Year	1975	1985	1992	2001	2005	2007	2009	2011
Population	15,430	12,404	10,816	8,561	7,869	7,544	7,181	...
Sources: Census 2001, Census 2011, „pop-stat.mashke.org“,

=== Religion ===
According to the latest Bulgarian census of 2011, the religious composition, among those who answered the optional question on religious identification, was the following:

Religious composition of Ugarchin Municipality
Orthodox Christianity	68.3%
Catholicism	0.8%
Protestantism	0.0%
Islam	1.5%
No religion	20.6%
Prefer not to answer, others and indefinable	8.8%

== See also ==
- Provinces of Bulgaria
- Municipalities of Bulgaria
- List of cities and towns in Bulgaria
