= Peshterna =

Pechterna Пещерна
- Village
- Location within Bulgaria
- Coordinates: 43.0833°N 24.2500°E
- Country: Bulgaria
- Province: Lovech Province
- Municipality: Lukovit
- Time zone: UTC+2 (EET)
  - Summer (DST): UTC+3 (EEST)

Pechterna is a village in Lukovit Municipality, Lovech Province, northern Bulgaria.
