= Karlukovo =

Karloukovo Карлуково
- Village
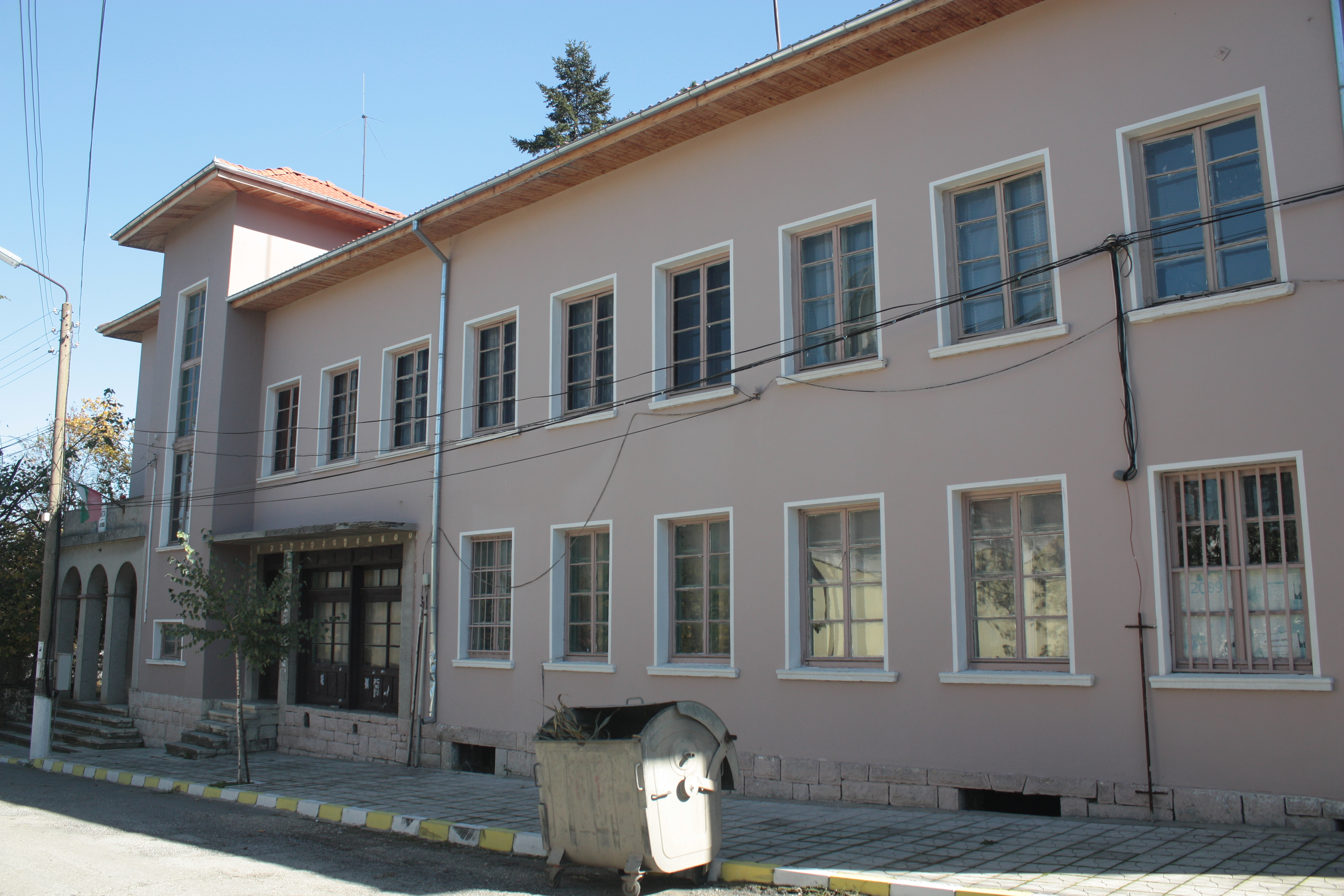
- Municipal office

- Location within Bulgaria
- Coordinates: 43.1667°N 24.0667°E
- Country: Bulgaria
- Province: Lovech Province
- Municipality: Lukovit
- Time zone: UTC+2 (EET)
  - Summer (DST): UTC+3 (EEST)

Karlukovo (Bulgarian: Карлуково [kɐrˈɫukovo]) is a village in Lukovit Municipality, Lovech Province, northwestern Bulgaria.
