= Katunets =

Katunets Катунец
- Location within Bulgaria
- Coordinates: 43°12′N 24°30′E
- Country: Bulgaria
- Province: Lovech
- Municipality: Ugarchin

Government
  - Mayor: Georgi Vytev
- Elevation: 215 m (705 ft)

Population (15 December 2007)
  - Total: 512
- Time zone: UTC+2 (EET)
  - Summer (DST): UTC+3 (EEST)

Katunets (Bulgarian: Катунец) is a Bulgarian village in the Municipality of Ugarchin, northern Bulgaria. The village is situated near the towns of Lovech and Pleven. The 43.5 km long Katuneshka river flows through the village.

== History ==
The first document mentioning Katunets is from the Turkish registries in 1840. According to the newspaper "Stremlenie" from 25 February 1912 the population of the village was around 2 750 people at the time. Katunets has soldiers from the Balkan War, the First World War and the Second World War. The village school opened in 1914. A book about the village - "Katunets, small encyclopedia" was released by Vutzo Bobenski and Petar Bobenski.

== Famous people ==
- Veselin Toetev Belomazhov — Bulgarian ambassador to Denmark from 2 February 1973 to 1 January 1977.
