= Cottus haemusi =

Conservation status
- Endangered (IUCN 3.1)

Scientific classification
- Kingdom: Animalia
- Phylum: Chordata
- Class: Actinopterygii
- Order: Perciformes
- Suborder: Cottoidei
- Family: Cottidae
- Genus: Cottus
- Species: C. haemusi

Binomial name
- Cottus haemusi Marinov & Dikov, 1986

Synonyms
- Cottus gobio haemusi

Species of fish

Cottus haemusi is a species of freshwater ray-finned fish belonging to the family Cottidae, the typical sculpins.

== Description ==
It is endemic to Bulgaria. It inhabits the Beli Vit, the main stem of the river Vit of the Danube river drainage. It reaches a maximum length of 10 cm (3.9 in).
