= Ugarchin =

Ugarchin Угърчин
- Town
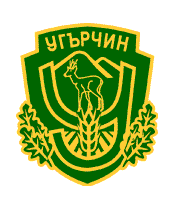
- Coat of arms

- Location of Ugarchin
- Coordinates: 43°06′N 24°25′E
- Country: Bulgaria
- Province (Oblast): Lovech
- Municipality: Ugarchin

Government
  - Mayor: Valentin Valchev
- Elevation: 297 m (974 ft)

Population (31.12.2018)
  - Total: 2,354
- Time zone: UTC+2 (EET)
  - Summer (DST): UTC+3 (EEST)
- Postal Code: 5580
- Area code: 06931

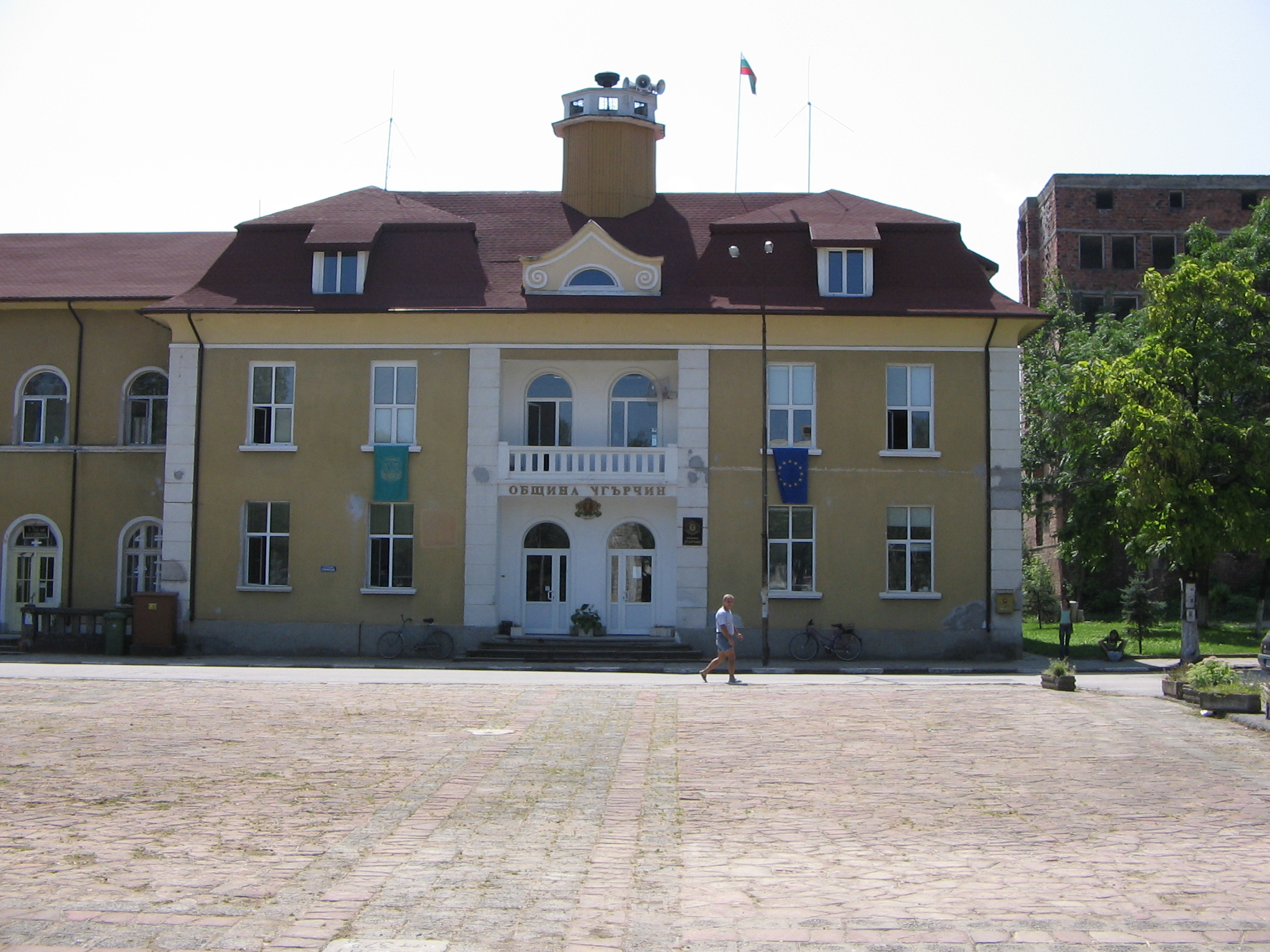
Ugarchin municipality hall

Ugarchin (Bulgarian: Угърчин [oɡɐrˈt͡ʃin]) is a town located along the Kamenitsa river in the Lovech Province in central northern Bulgaria. It is the administrative centre of the homonymous Ugarchin Municipality. The town is about 30 kilometers away in the west from the main centre of the province (Lovech). As of December 2009, it had a population of 2,832 inhabitants which sunk to 2,354 by end of 2018.

Ugarchin is situated in the northern part of the Balkan Mountains at the foot the high peaks and down the river Kamenitsa and its minor tributaries: Lepetora, Sveta, Greshki Dol and others. It is situated in a basin rounded with small hills: Ivan Dyal hill to the south; Visokata Mogila (Chukara) to the east; to the north are Beli Kamak, Sredno Bardo and Zabiti Kamak hills; and to the west are Goli Rat and Chukata.

The Ugarchin town holiday takes place every year on 22 March and the traditional Autumn Fair is every 22 September. The President of Bulgaria Georgi Parvanov visited the town of Ugarchin on 22 March 2006 for the annual football tournament.

Other places in Ugarchin municipality include Dragana, Golets, Kalenik, Katunets, Kirchevo, Kirkova mahala, Lesidren, Mikre, Orlyane, Slavshitsa, Sopot, and Vasilkovska mahala.

== Honour ==
Ugarchin Point on Robert Island, South Shetland Islands is named after Ugarchin.
