= Dragana, Bulgaria =

Dragana Драгана
- Village
- Location within Bulgaria
- Coordinates: 42.1783°N 24.3942°E
- Country: Bulgaria
- Province: Lovech Province
- Municipality: Ugarchin
- Time zone: UTC+2 (EET)
  - Summer (DST): UTC+3 (EEST)

Dragana is a village in Ugarchin Municipality, Lovech Province, northern Bulgaria.
