= Balgarski Izvor =

Balgarski izvor Български Извор
- Village
- Location within Bulgaria
- Coordinates: 43.0333°N 24.2833°E
- Country: Bulgaria
- Province: Lovech Province
- Municipality: Teteven
- Time zone: UTC+2 (EET)
  - Summer (DST): UTC+3 (EEST)

Balgarski izvor (Bulgarian: Български извор, Bulgarian springs) is a village in Teteven Municipality, Lovech Province, northern Bulgaria. The population is 1,294 people.

== Political situation ==
In the local municipality of Bulgarian - Izvor, which includes Bulgarian- Izvor, the position of kmet (headman) is performed by Asen Radinov Deliev (Bulgarian Socialist Party (BSP)) based on the election results.

Kmet (Mayor) of the Teteven community — Nikolay Petrov Pavlov (Citizens for European Development of Bulgaria (COAT of Arms)) based on the election results.
