= Idilevo =

- Village
- Location within Bulgaria
- Coordinates: 43°02′N 25°15′E
- Country: Bulgaria
- Province: Gabrovo Province
- Municipality: Sevlievo
- Time zone: UTC+2 (EET)
  - Summer (DST): UTC+3 (EEST)

Idilevo is a village in the municipality of Sevlievo, in Gabrovo Province, in northern central Bulgaria.

The current mayor of the village (re-elected 2016) is Hristo Peev

Idilevo is the home of the Motocamp which specializes in providing accommodation and assistance to motorcycle travelers.
