= Toros (village) =

Toros Торос
- Village
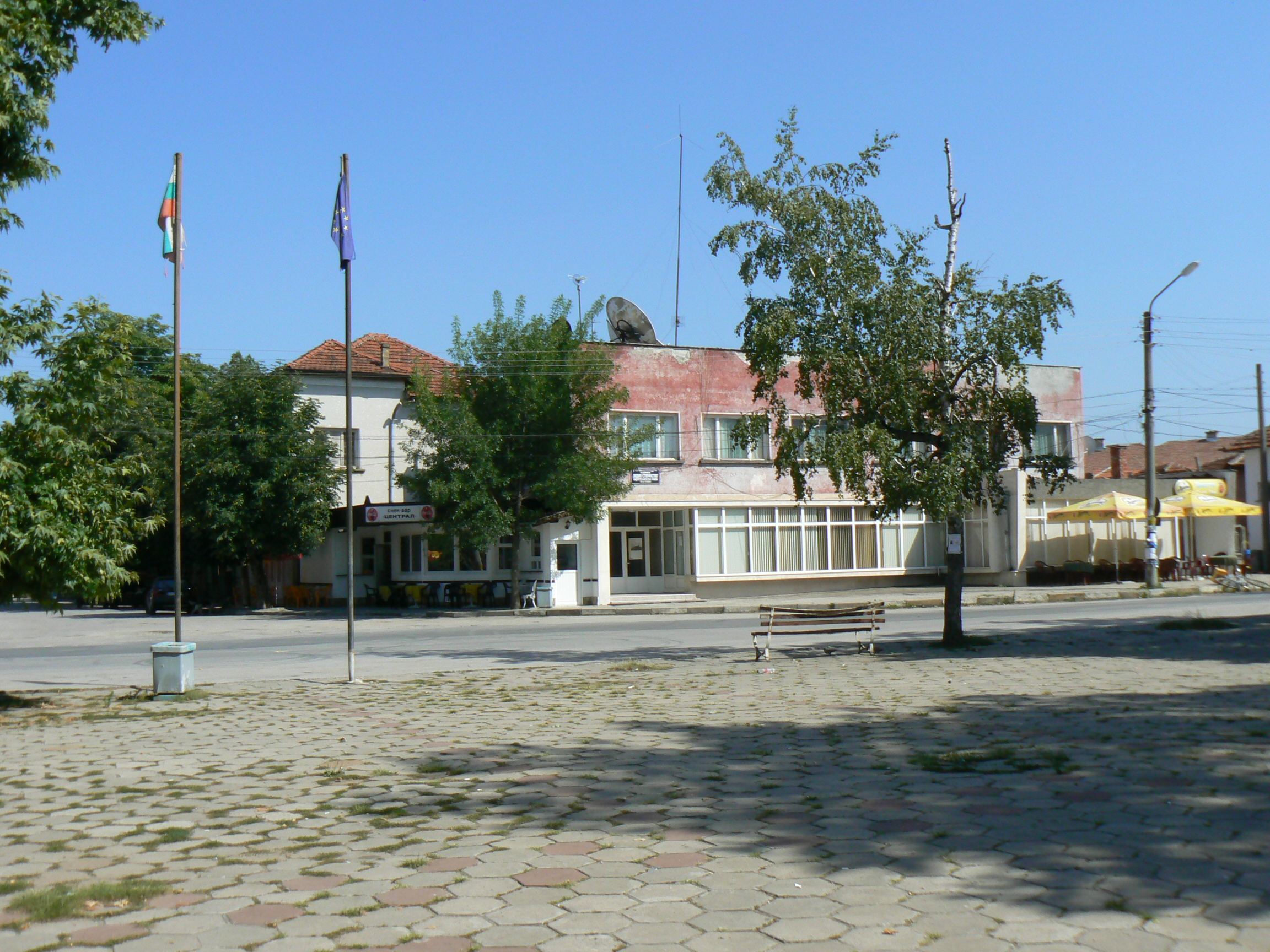
- Village centre

- Location within Bulgaria
- Coordinates: 43.1000°N 24.2833°E
- Country: Bulgaria
- Province: Lovech Province
- Municipality: Lukovit
- Time zone: UTC+2 (EET)
  - Summer (DST): UTC+3 (EEST)

Toros is a village in Lukovit Municipality, Lovech Province, northern Bulgaria.
