= Sopot, Lovech Province =

Coordinates: 43°01′34″N 24°25′32″E

Sopot (Bulgarian: Сопот) is a village in northern Bulgaria, located in the Ugarchin Municipality of the Lovech Province.
