= Lukovit Municipality =

Lukovit Municipality Община Луковит
- Municipality
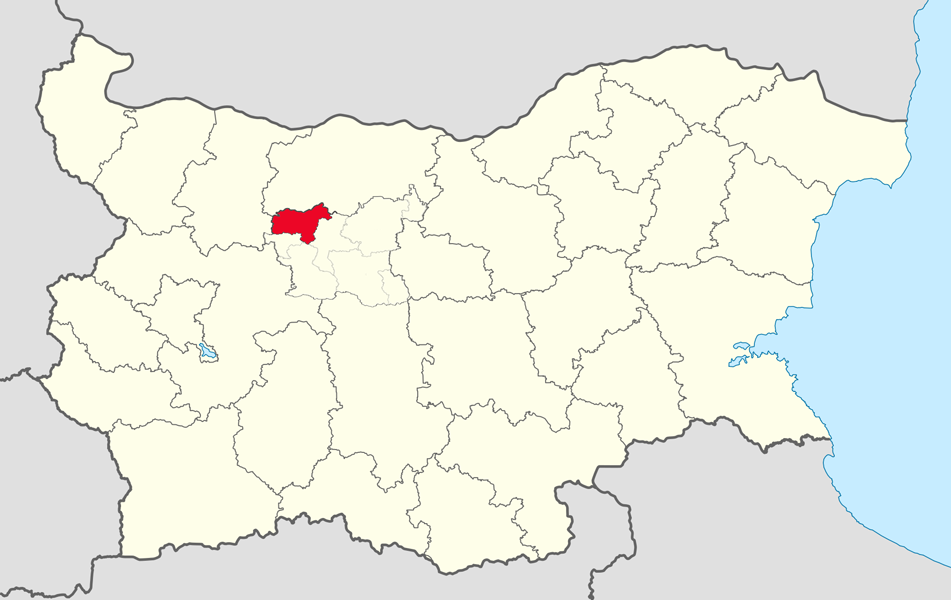
- Lukovit Municipality within Bulgaria and Lovech Province.
- Coordinates: 43°10′N 24°10′E
- Country: Bulgaria
- Province (Oblast): Lovech
- Admin. centre (Obshtinski tsentar): Lukovit

Area
  - Total: 454.22 km^{2} (175.38 sq mi)

Population (December 2009)
  - Total: 19,469
  - Density: 42.862/km^{2} (111.01/sq mi)
- Time zone: UTC+2 (EET)
  - Summer (DST): UTC+3 (EEST)

Lukovit Municipality (Bulgarian: Община Луковит) is a municipality (obshtina) in Lovech Province, Central-North Bulgaria, located from the Fore-Balkan area to the southern parts of Danubian Plain. It is named after its administrative centre - the town of Lukovit.

The municipality embraces a territory of 454.22 km^{2} (175.38 sq mi) with a population of 19,469 inhabitants, as of December 2009.

The west operating part of Hemus motorway is planned to continue through the area linking the province centre Lovech.

== Settlements ==
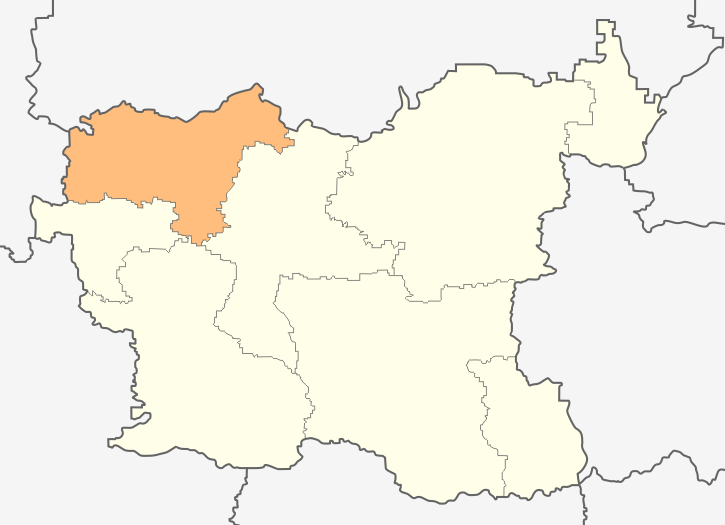
Lukovit Municipality within Lovech Province

Lukovit Municipality includes the following 12 places (towns are shown in bold):

Town/Village	Cyrillic	Population (December 2009)
**Lukovit**	**Луковит**	9,630
Aglen	Ъглен	836
Bezhanovo	Бежаново	1,497
Belentsi	Беленци	448
Dermantsi	Дерманци	2,348
Daben	Дъбен	149
Karlukovo	Карлуково	782
Petrevene	Петревене	690
Peshterna	Пещерна	148
Rumyantsevo	Румянцево	823
Todorichene	Тодоричене	499
Toros	Торос	1,619
Total		19,469

== Demography ==
The following table shows the change of the population during the last four decades. Since 1992 Lukovit Municipality has comprised the former municipality of Dermantsi and the numbers in the table reflect this unification.

Lukovit Municipality
**Year**	1975	1985	1992	**2001**	2005	2007	2009	**2011**
**Population**	16,973	15,631	23,783	21,466	20,371	19,934	19,469	...
Sources: Census 2001, Census 2011, „pop-stat.mashke.org“,

=== Religion ===
According to the latest Bulgarian census of 2011, the religious composition, among those who answered the optional question on religious identification, was the following:

Religious composition of Lukovit Municipality
Orthodox Christianity	65.0%
Catholicism	0.8%
Protestantism	4.6%
Islam	2.8%
No religion	13.3%
Prefer not to answer, others and indefinable	13.3%

== See also ==
- Provinces of Bulgaria
- Municipalities of Bulgaria
- List of cities and towns in Bulgaria
