= Petrevene =

Petrevene Петревене
- Village
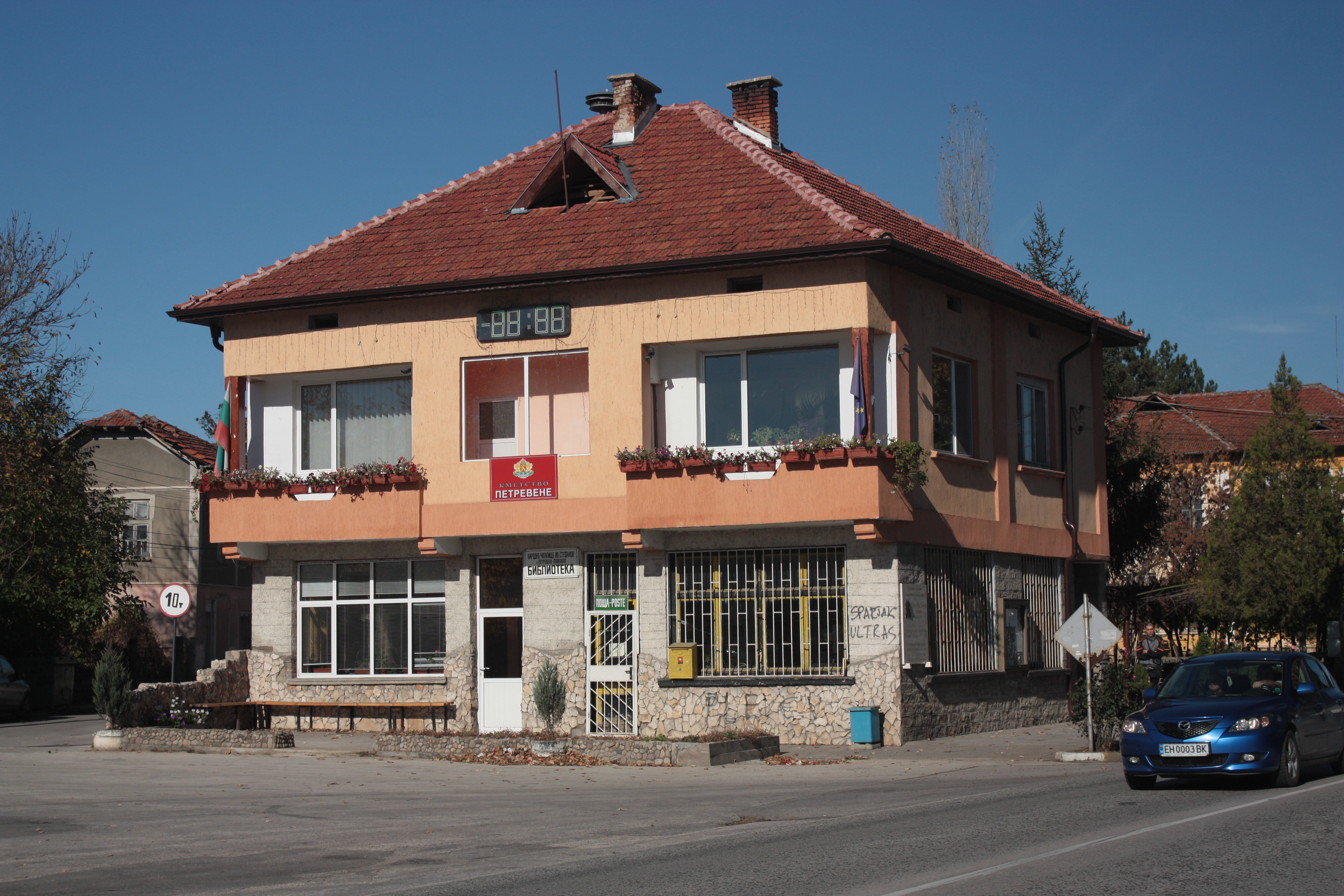

- Location of Petrevene
- Coordinates: 43°9′32″N 24°8′53″E
- Country: Bulgaria
- Provinces (Oblast): Lovech Province

Area
  - Total: 17.823 km^{2} (6.881 sq mi)
- Elevation: 135 m (443 ft)

Population (1 January 2006)
  - Total: 659
  - Density: 37.0/km^{2} (95.8/sq mi)
- Demonym(s): Petreventzi, (Петревенци)
- Time zone: UTC+2 (EET)
  - Summer (DST): UTC+3 (EEST)
- Postal Code: 5784
- Area code: 06981
- Website: www.petrevene.com/en/

Petrevene (Bulgarian: Петревене, pronounced [ˈpɛtrɛvɛnɛ] or [pɛtrɛˈvɛnɛ]) is a village in north-central Bulgaria. It is situated on the left bank of Panega river (Bulgarian: Панега, also: Zlatna Panega, Bulgarian: Златна Панега, 'Golden Panega', old: Paneg, Altǎn Paneg). It is in the Municipality of Lukovit, part of the District of Lovech, and is 6 kilometres (3.7 mi) away from the municipality center of Lukovit. The main road E-83 and the railroad Cherven Bryag—Zlatna Panega pass through it.

Historical records of the settlement date back to the early 15th century, during the Ottoman Empire, although evidence from the surrounding areas indicates the area was likely settled much earlier. Historically, it has been an important part of the marble trade, and is notable for its long history of shifting Pomak Muslim and Christian village populations and tensions.

It known for its local festival, Watermelon Day – a longstanding and popular local tradition dating back to 1936. The local economy is based around small farming, particularly cattle, and services to traffic from the local high road.

== Etymology ==
The etymology of Petrevene's name likely stems from the ancient Greek word for stone, petros (Ancient Greek: πέτρoς), as the Nabataean city of Petra, now in Jordan. Indeed, there are numerous sandstone quarries nearby, used since ancient times. High quality stones (though not real marble) from them have been extracted and exported even to Romania. Petrevene's medieval name, Mramor or Mramornitza, i.e. 'marble', seems to support this hypothesis. In fact, under the name of 'Miramor, Mromor', i.e. 'Mramor', soon after the Ottoman invasion Petrevene was listed in Tahrir Defter, the first Ottoman tax registry of 1430. Probably, even before that, during the Second Bulgarian State, its name was still Mramor or Mramornitza. It is quite possible also that Petrevene is named after some individual called Petǎr (indeed, in its vicinity there are ruins known as Petrova gradezh, i.e. 'Peter's construction')—a village elder, or an Eastern Orthodox monk (of the nearby Middle Age monastery of St. Peter and St. Paul, the ruins of which can be found near the bridge of the Belenska River south of the village). The alternative name under which Petrevene is listed in Tahrir Defter, "Petreve sele", i.e. "Petrevo selo", seems to support this hypothesis. It is quite possible that the name came from both of the above hypotheses.

== Geography ==
On the edge of the Danubian Plain and Stara Planina, Petrevene lies almost entirely on the left bank of Panega river. The village is bordered by the hill Belopole to its west and by Panega river to its east. It is built primarily on terraces which face towards the river and are built into the hillside.

=== Climate and drainage ===
The climate is well-defined temperate continental, precipitation being an average of 450 mm (18 in) to 550 mm (22 in) a year. This is lower than the standard precipitation for the Danubian plain as its proximity to Stara Planina means that the annual rainfall is lower. However, since Petrevene lies on Panega river, it is well irrigated and is home to a large amount of natural springs. A lot of these natural springs were then developed and made into public drinking water taps. Among these there are the Rashkovo Kladenche, Blyalata Cheshma and Ibovetz. There is also a tributary which feeds into Panega river, locally known as Dulǎt (Bulgarian: Дулът). Most of the households which lie on either side of the Dulǎt use it as an open sewer for human and household waste. Although the village does have a minor sewage disposal system it does not extend to the entire village.

=== Nature ===
Perevene

Petrevene is located 2.5 kilometres (1.6 mi) away from Geopark Iskǎr-Panega, (a UNESCO-run nature reserve which is managed by Lukovit County). Much of the flora and fauna present there can also be found in Petrevene. As the agricultural industry in Petrevene diminished, many of the surrounding fields were left unfarmed and were consequently overrun by wilderness and weeds. This meant that many of the original animals and plants that were driven out in order to make the land fully arable could now begin to restore their presence. On the other hand, many plants common to the sphere of agriculture have been naturalized and have become commonplace due to the extensive farming. For example, wheat can be commonly found around the area.

==== Fauna ====
The surrounding countryside is home to many types of wildlife; however, most of the animals present in the region can also be observed in other areas of Bulgaria. The variety of mammals in the region, for example, is quite rich. Species that are widely spread throughout Bulgaria are predominant here: these include hedgehogs (Erinaceus concolor), moles (Talpa europaea), blind mole-rats (Nannospalax leucodon), Eurasian red squirrels (Sciurus vulgaris), striped field mice (Apodemus agrarius), common voles (Microtus arvalis), wild rabbits (Lepus capensis), hamsters (Spermophilus citellus), wildcats (Felis sylvestris), foxes (Vulpes vulpes), beech martens (Martes foina), badgers (Meles meles), weasels (Mustela nivalis), otters (Lutra lutra), polecats (Mustela putorius), jackals (Canis aureus), wild boar (Sus scrofa) and roe deer (Capreolus capreolus).

The bird life of the region is quite rich. Most of these bird species are widely spread in the country. Some of these typically inhabit the fields – partridge (Perdix perdix), quail (Coturnix coturnix), field-lark (Alauda arvensis), yellow wagtail (Motacilla flava), grey rook (Corvus corone), blue crow (Coracias garrulus), bee-eater (Merops apiaster), others inhabitants of the forests – nightingale (Luscinia megarhynchos), wood-lark (Lullula arborea), garden warbler (Sylvia atricapilla), long-eared owl (Asio otus), tawny owl (Strix aluco). There are also several birds which inhabit the area that are listed in the Bulgaria section of the IUCN Red List. These include, but are not limited to, black stork (Ciconia nigra), pygmy cormorant (Microcarbo pygmeus), peregrine falcon (Falco peregrinus), Levant sparrowhawk (Accipiter brevipes) and the lesser spotted eagle (Aquila pomarina). The area is home to many reptiles, among which features the great crested newt (Triturus cristatus). A common occurrence is for these animals to come into contact with the local people, either directly or indirectly. For example, badgers, weasels, and beech martens are regularly blamed for attacking local livestock, (mostly chickens and small fowl). Indeed, this is a major problem in some instances as jackals, for example, may wander into the village and attack sheep, livestock, and sometimes even guard dogs. For this reason most livestock owners tend to lock up their animals at night.

==== Flora ====
According to the botanical–geographic partition of Bulgaria, Petrevene falls in the Euro-Asian steppe and forest steppe areas, specifically the Illyrian province, part of the Pre-Balkan Range, Troyan-Tǎrnovo area. As with much of the fauna, many of the plants present can be found in the Geopark Iskǎr-Panega. The area is home to a rich variety of flora, as many plant species are distributed on the limestone terrain of Petrevene's region within Bulgaria. Among them there are some rare and endemic plants, which are decreasing throughout Bulgaria. These include endemic species like urum, (Seseli degenii), a plant endemic to the area, (found primarily within the central section of the Pre-Balkan area), which is listed in the Bulgaria section of the IUCN Red List as well as the European register for rare, threatened and endemic plant species.

== Government ==
As part of the village's public services and institutions, there exist a post office, an Orthodox Christian church and a public library, which covers a total of 190 square metres (2,000 sq ft), contains 4786 volumes and hosts the Ivan Stefanov-1918 Cultural Community Center. There are a total of 40 registered members of the library.

== History ==
=== In antiquity ===
The earliest evidence of settlements in the area is an Iron-Age grave, discovered in the Cherkovishteto region. Several Thracian burial mounds surround the village, left by the Thracian tribe of Tribals.

=== During the Middle Ages ===
It is likely Petrevene has existed since the First and the Second Bulgarian State. Its medieval name was Mramornitza or Mramor and it has been the center of the surrounding district of Mramornitza. The ruins of the St. Peter and St. Paul monastery in the Ragachevoto region are from the Middle Ages. In the 13th century, when Bulgaria was under the direct rule of the Byzantine Empire, Bulgarian-Paulicians moved into the region from Thrace. They adhered to non-canonical heretical Christian beliefs. Together with the Bogomils and other heretics, they were antagonistic to the official Eastern Orthodox Church, with which they were fierce adversaries and rivals. During the early Ottoman period, and probably even before that, during the Second Bulgarian State, the village of Rumyancevo used to be called Golam Pavlikan. A hamlet of the village of Zlatna Panega is still called Pavlikeni, and the monastery near Petrevene is devoted to St. Peter and St. Paul. It is believed that Bulgarian-Paulicians have Armenian-Paulician ancestry. The non-canonical religious beliefs were prosecuted as heretical by the dominant Eastern Orthodox Church, as well as by the pre-Ottoman authorities. However, they were tolerated later by the Ottoman authorities.

=== The center of Mramornitza District (Turkish: Kazá) (14th–16th centuries) ===
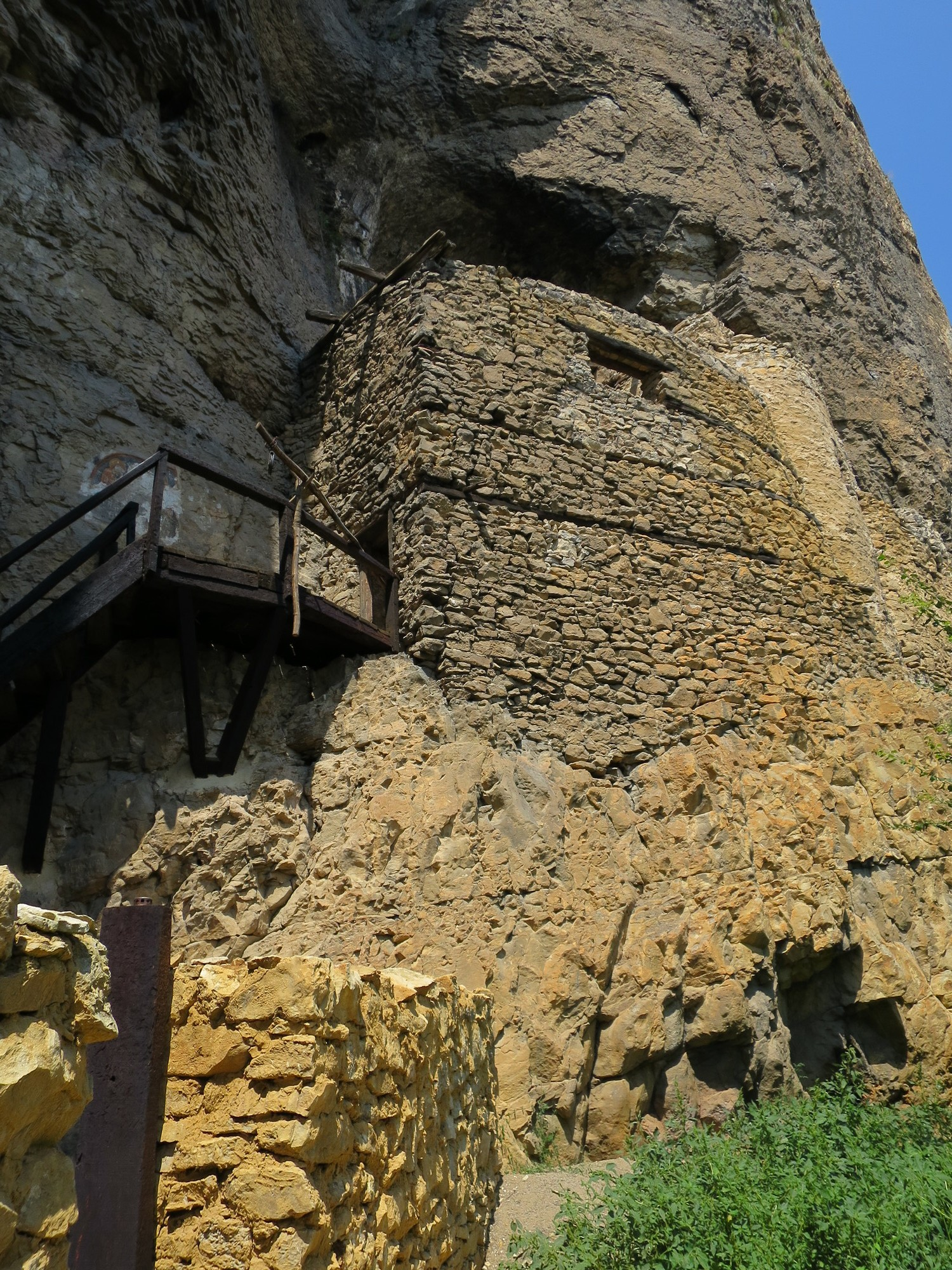
The rock monastery of St. Nikolai (Gligora) near Karlukovo, 14th century

According to the Tahrir Defter tax registry, Petrevene was the center of Mromornicha (Bulgarian: Mramornitza, Мраморница) District (Turkish: kazá) of the Nikbolu (Bulgarian: Nikopol) region (Turkish: sancak) during the early Ottoman Empire. The Mramornitza District included the present day localities: Bărkach, Karlukovo, Krushovitza, Lepitza, Lukovit, Petrevene, Petarnitza, Oreshene, Reseletz, Ruptzi, Sadovetz, Suhache, Todorichene, Cherven Bryag, Chomakovtzi, etc. It bordered the kazas of Nikopol from the north (including Glava and Koynare), Lovech from the east (including Toros, Dermantzi, and Gradeshnitza), Kievo from the south (in the Glozhene region, including Belentzi and Hubavene), Nedelino and Vratza from the west (including Roman, and Byala Slatina). Until 1585, and even probably during the Second Bulgarian State, Petrevene carried two names – Mramor and Petreven, or their variations, and used to be the center of the District of Mramornitza. Soon after the Ottoman conquest of the Balkans, in 1430, it is included in the Ottoman tax registry, Tahrir Defter, where it is listed as Mramor (Turkish: Miramor, Mromor), as a first name, and as Petrevo selo (Turkish: Betreve sele) as a second. Since for the time being the Ottoman administration have preserved the existing economy structures of the previous governments together with their tax systems from the pre-Ottoman period, it is quite likely that under the name Mramornitza or Mramor, Petrevene was the center of the district, probably called also Mramornitza, even during the Second Bulgarian State.

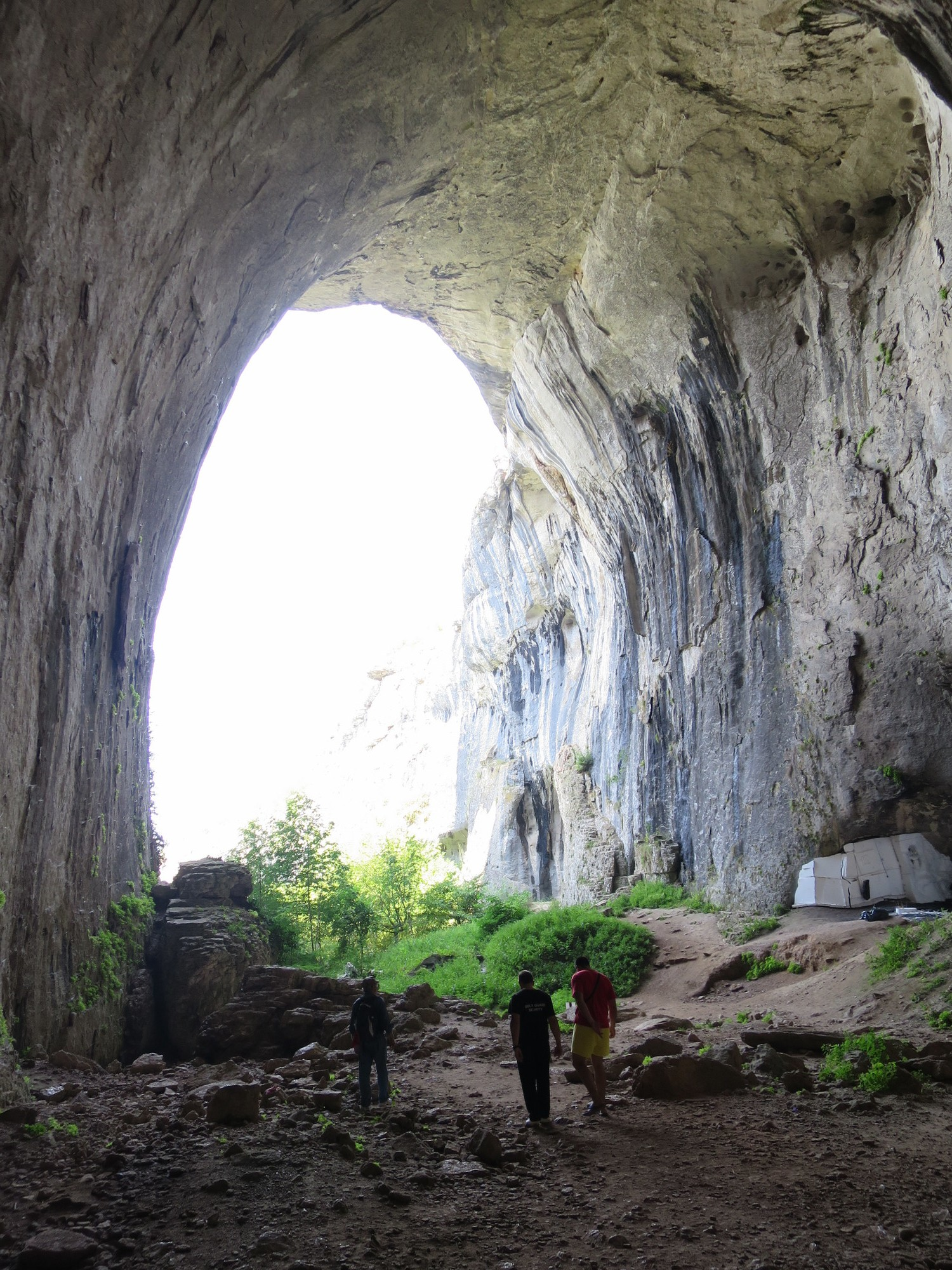
The Prohodna cave in the Karlukovo canyon

In 1479 Petrevene is listed under the first name Petrevo selo and by the second, Mromor. At the same year it had 26 married Christian houses (one house consisted of five people) and one Christian widow, while in 1516 it had 14 married Christian houses and 13 Christian widows. During the early Ottoman period, only heretical Christian groups (such as the Paulicians and Bogomils) were listed as Christians (or Kristians), while the Eastern Orthodox Christians, subject to the Greek Patriarch of Constantinople, were listed as Rum mileti.

=== During the late Ottoman period (16th–19th centuries) ===
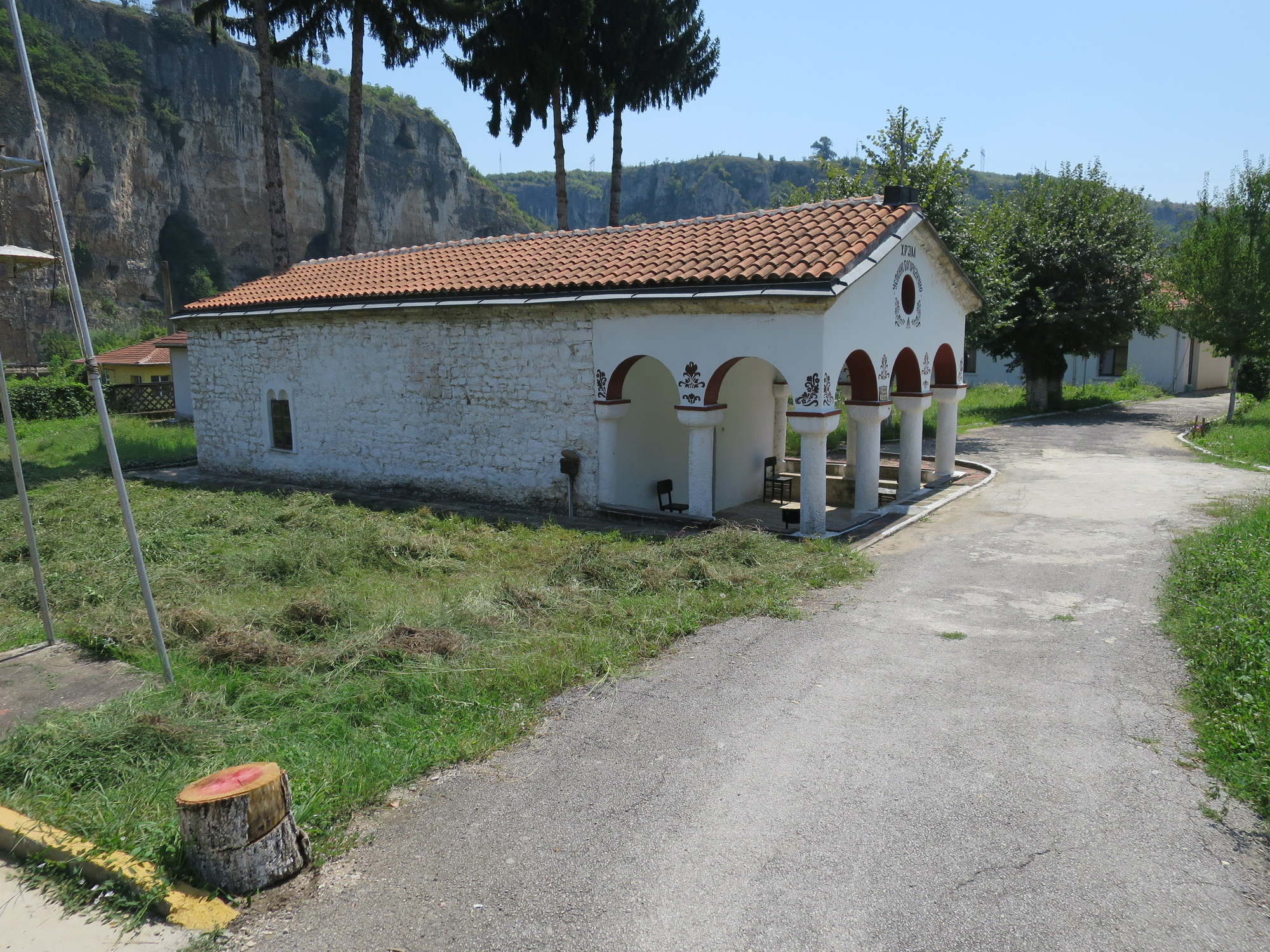
Karlukovo 'Dormition of the Theotokos' monastery, 14th century

In 1516 under the rule of Sultan Selim I, the Ottoman Empire underwent major administrative changes. As a result, the kazá of Mramornitza was closed. Parts of it were included in the kazás of Nikbolu (Bulgarian: Nikopol) and Ivraca (Bulgarian: Vratza). As a result, Petrevene began to decline and part of its population moved elsewhere. Some of it likely migrated to the villages of Mramoren in Vractza district and Petarnitza in Pleven district. Afterwards, the village was included in the kazás of Ivraca (Bulgarian: Vratza) – in 1516, Nikbolu (Bulgarian: Nikopol) – през 1545 and Plevne (Bulg.: Pleven), part of the Tuna vilaeti – in 1579 and 1873. While in 1545 and 1579 Petrevene was recorded under the first name Petreven and under the second name Mramor, in 1585 it is recorded only under the name of Petre (Turkish: Betre). After 1585, the name Mramor, as well as Mramornitza, disappeared and with the passage of time, were forgotten. Ethnic Turks have never lived in Petrevene, though Pomaks (i.e. Bulgarian Christian heretical groups that converted to Islam) have. The first Pomaks in the region were registered at the end of the 15th century. In Petrevene, the first Pomaks were two people who converted to Islam in 1545 and were given the Arabic names Isa (Bulgarian: Isus) and Abdi, sons of Abdullahwhich. The word Pomak appeared first in the Bulgarian Christian-heretical linguistic regions of North Bulgaria (the regions of Lovech, Teteven, Lukovit, the kazá of Mramornitza). It likely comes from the expression "пó ямак" ('more than an Yamak', 'more important than an Yamak', similarly to "пó юнак", i.e. 'more than a hero'). It is quite possible also that the word comes from the dialect expressions "помáкан, омáкан, омáчен, помáчен" (pomákan, omákan, omáchen, pomáchen) in the sense of 'provided by an estate or farmland', 'farmer', provided by a guaranteed мáка, an old dialect North Bulgarian word for 'property, ownership, farm, estate', unlike the Bulgarian Christians, who, before the Tanzimat reforms in 1839 did not have a guaranteed мáка. In 1545, Petrevene had nine married and four unmarried Christian houses and three Christian widows, and one married and one unmarried Pomak house, while in 1579 there were 30 married and 17 unmarried Christian houses and three married and three unmarried Pomak houses. In 1616 the troops of the Crimean-Tatar khan Mirza Tatar, which were included in the vanguard of the Ottoman army, passed through the region. They burglarized and kidnapped the local population, the Christian part of which escaped to the Karlukovo Canyon. During the second half of the 17th century, Pomaks from the region of Teteven began to move to the region of Lukovit. The Christian part of the local population escaped again to the Karlukovo Canyon. In 1690s the troops of another Crimean-Tatar khan, Selim Giray, which were included in the vanguard of the Ottoman army in its war against Austro-Hungary, also passed through the region on their way from Romania to Sofia via Pleven, Lovech, Yablanitza and Etropole.

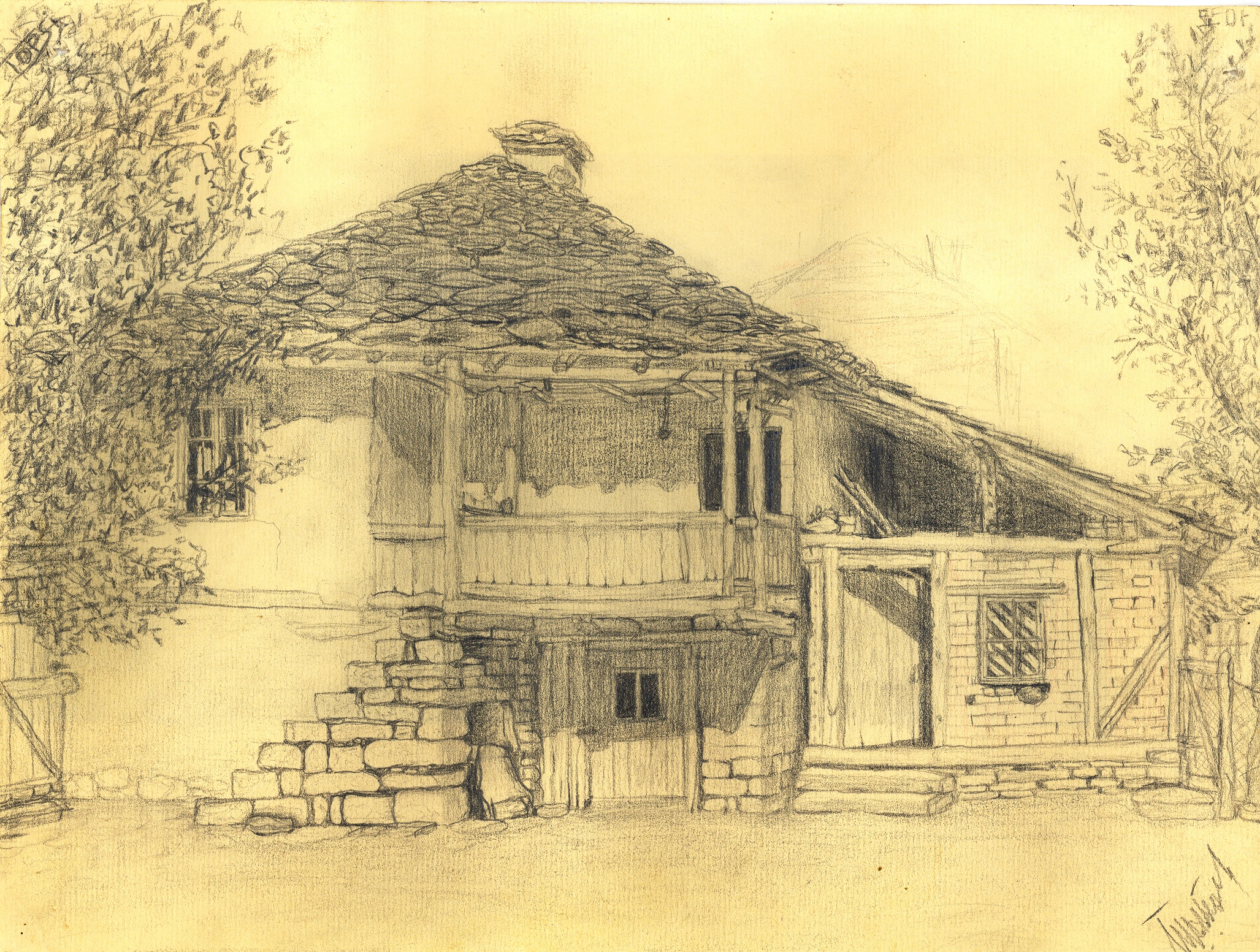
House in Petrevene, 19th century

The non-canonical Christian heresies (such as Paulicianism and Bogomilism) survived in the region of Petrevene until the end of the 17th century, when dramatic religious events occurred. In 1689, for military reasons, the Ottoman authorities began to force Bulgarian Christian heretics to convert to one of the officially recognized religions in the Ottoman Empire. This threw the local population into a crisis. One part of the Bulgarian Christian heretics converted reluctantly to Eastern Orthodoxy, which they had until then opposed and hated, and were incorporated into the Bulgarian-Christian community. The other part no less reluctantly converted to Islam and began to be called Pomaks, but were not incorporated into the ethnic Turkish community. Pomaks in the region became those of Bulgarian Christian heretics, for which it was unacceptable or impossible to convert to Eastern Orthodoxy because of dogmatic, economic, family or other reasons. Men started wearing chalmas and turbans, while women wore sharowars and covers. A village mosque was erected in the middle of Petrevene. While the Pomaks gardened, Bulgarian Christians primarily. bred livestock. Petrevene Pomaks had very melodic songs, which they accompanied with bulgarina music. They had deep and emotional feelings towards the river, which they called Altăn Paneg. With the passage of time the names, as well as the beliefs of the Christian heretics, disappeared and were forgotten.

At the end of the 18th century, bands of Kirdzhalis, as well as Hayduks from Angel voyvoda and Vălchan voyvoda appeared in the region. At that time the Karlukovo monastery dedicated to the Dormition of the Theotokos was in the eparchy of St. Sofroniy Vrachanski, the well-known Bulgarian Archbishop of Vratza, under the Patriarchate of Constantinople. On Christmas in 1799 he found a cover from the Kirdzhalis in the monastery.

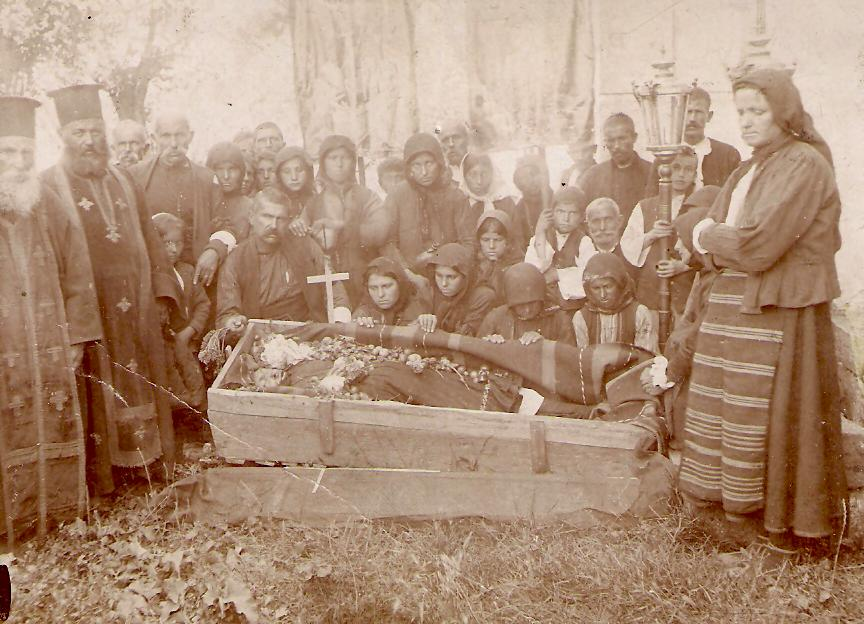
Funeral in Petrevene at the end of the 19th century

The relationship between the Christian and the Pomak parts of the population has been uneven. In 1820 the head of the Karlukovo monastery, Kalinik, warned some of the local Pomaks to respect the Christian part of the population since the Russians would come someday. After that, some Pomaks from the region of Lovech complained to the authorities that Kalinik was going to invite Russian troops to Bulgaria. The word pomak appeared for the first time in written in connection with this incident.

On Christmas of 1871, the Bulgarian national hero and revolutionary Vasil Levski passed through the region on his way from Glozhene and Zlatna Panega to Cherven Bryag and Telish during his second trip through Bulgaria. The Secret Revolutionary Committee in Lukovit was founded by him during this trip.

During the late Ottoman period the Christian and the Pomak parts of the population experienced a demographic boom. In 1873 Petrevene had 122 Christian houses with 414 men and 64 Pomak houses with 160 men. A few among the Bulgarian Christians were craftsmen and grocers, settlers from the town of Teteven (previously: Tetevene, Tetyuvene). During the Russian-Turkish War of 1877–78, the Pomak part of the population in the region escaped temporarily to Macedonia, to come back after the end of the war.

=== After the restoration of Bulgarian statehood (1878–1918) ===
The removal of the Ottoman rule in 1878 brought a mass migration to Petrevene of Eastern Orthodox Bulgarians from upper Balkan villages such as Brusen and Vidrare with its hamlets including Smolevica and Kraeva Bachiya. In 1882 Felix Kanitz wrote its name as Petreven. It also used to be written as Petrevyane, Petryovene or Petrovene (Bulgarian: Петрeвяне, Петрьовене, Петровене), still in use among locals nowadays. Since 1891 its official name is Petrevene. It was included in the District of Pleven of the Principality of Bulgaria. The Tonovski, Gergovski, Tzanovski, Stoevski, Velevski, Moldovanete, Dilovski, and Nedkovski families were among the first in Petrevene after the removal of Ottoman rule. Vidrarians favored raising cattle, while Brusenes favored water buffalos. This was the source of some friction in the village. Initially, marriages between the new generations of Bruseners and Vidrareans were banned for some time. Possibly this was because they came from different Christian dioceses.

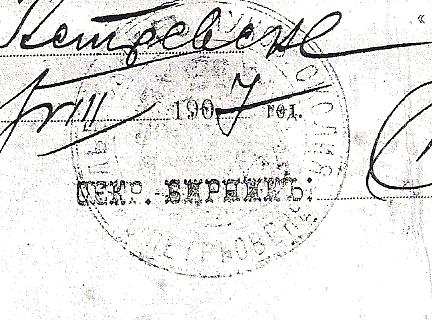
The municipality seal of the village of Petryovene, 1907

The first mayor of Petrevene after the removal of the Ottoman rule was Tono Benchev Bakov (Peykin) of Vidrare, born in the hamlet of Smolevica. He was a member of the Revolutionary Committee Hasan Kasam founded by Vasil Levski in the village of Vidrare in 1869. He moved to Petrevene prior to the Russian-Turkish war (1877–78) due to a conflict he had with local Ottoman authorities in Vidrare. His brother-in-law, revolutionary Yosif Poppetrov from Vidrare, also a member of the revolutionary committee of Vasil Levski, was exiled by the Ottoman authorities to the town of Diarbekir in Middle Asia, now part of Turkey. This was due to his involvement with the robbery of the Ottoman Bank, mastered by Dimiter Obshti, in the Arabakonak pass in Bulgaria in 1872. Tono Benchev served as mayor of Petrevene for 16 years. He used to be close to Stefan Stambolov, a major co-revolutionary of Vasil Levski and then-Prime Minister of Bulgaria. He visited him during his official trips in the Principality of Bulgaria. The first secretary in the village municipality was Tono Benchev's son, Bencho Tonov. In 1878 an elementary school (1st to 4th grade) opened in Petrevene. Until 1891 it was hosted in a former Pomak house, after which it moved to the then-newly constructed old school, built by Stoyu Stanev of Petrevene. The village municipality (Bulgarian: obshtina) moved to the vacated former schoolhouse. Andrey Gadzhovski of Lukovit, born in Dranchevo, Macedonia, and Marko Markov of Karlovo were the first teachers in Petrevene. The first native teacher, Velyu Ninov, was hired in 1896. During the 1890s Petrevene was terrorized by the local band of Bulgarian Yako Voyvoda and his Pomak co-brigand Kachamachko.

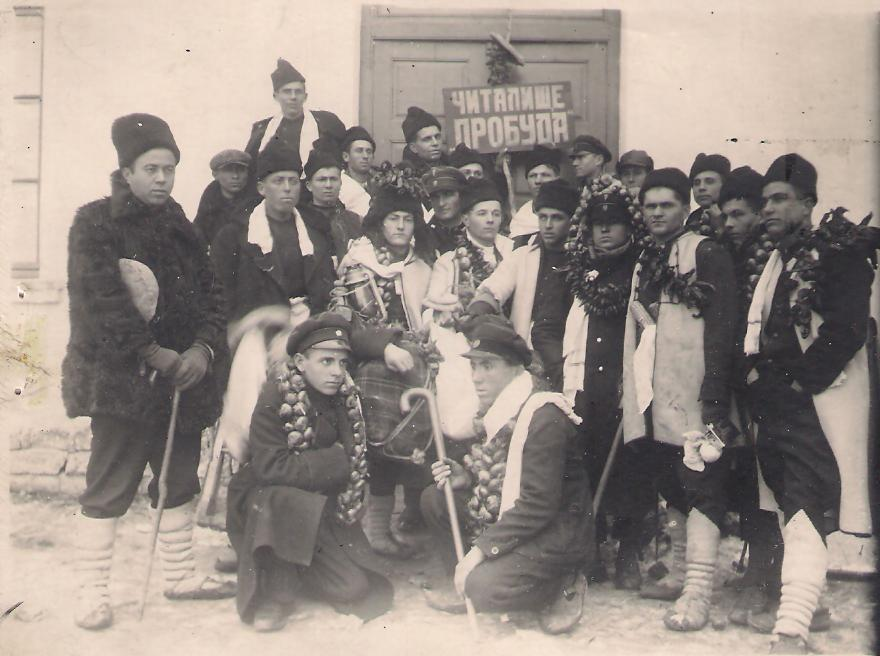
Young men after taking part in the ritual of koleduvane on behalf of the Probuda Community Cultural Center, 1930.

A mass exodus to Turkey by the Pomaks in the region started after the Unification of Bulgaria in 1885. They moved mostly to the regions of the cities Çorlu in East Thrace and Hasanbey in Balikesir in Anatolia. Their property and estates were thereby bought, transferred to, or abandoned and acquired by the remaining population. A Pomak school opened briefly in the village of Blasnichevo to encourage Pomaks to remain in their locations. In 1893 only 22 Pomaks remained in Petrevene. The entire Pomak population left the village by 1898. Several Italian quarrymen settled in Petrevene at the beginning of the 20th century. They created, in particular, many skillful gravestones, still standing in the village cemetery.

Due to the rise of anti-Islamism and nationalism in post-Ottoman Bulgaria, the abandoned and decaying village mosque was removed in 1902. Its materials were recycled and used in the construction of the present-day Eastern Orthodox church of the Dormition of the Theotokos. It was built by Trǎn constructors in 1902 not far from the location of the former mosque with the enthusiastic support of the locals. They donated money, icons and church appliances to it. The population of Petrevene was not affected harshly by the two World Wars. Only a few people fought and less than fifty died in the wars. During the Balkan Wars (1912–1913) Petrevene soldiers took part in the battle for the town of Chataldzha in East Trace, while during the First World War (1915–1918) they fought on the Macedonian Front. A humble monument devoted to the fallen villagers during the wars was erected in 2003 in the village center. During the Second Balkan War (1913) North Bulgaria was occupied briefly by the invading Romanian troops. In Petrevene they used to frequently search houses and backyards for hidden items.

=== Between the world wars (1918–1944) ===
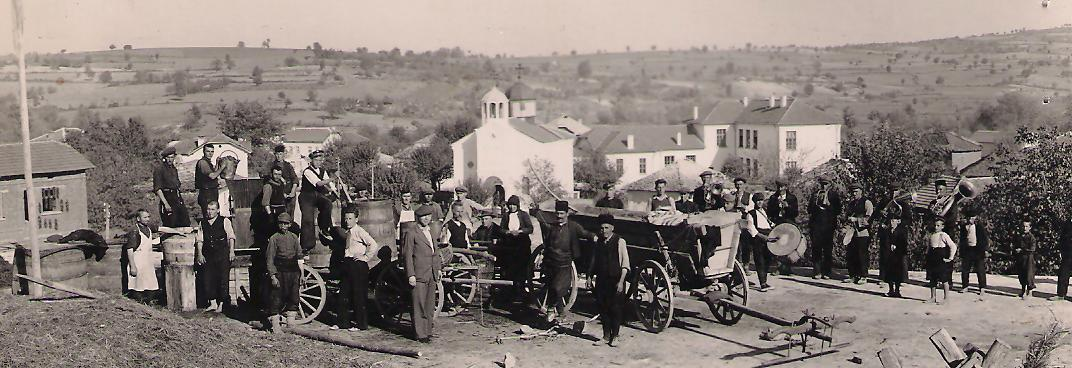
Celebrating the first grape harvest at the Vine Cellar, Petrevene, 1940s

The 1918 opening of the local Probuda ('Awakening') Community Cultural Center (Bulgarian: chitalishte, читалище), including a public library, boosted the cultural development of Petrevene. It was founded on the initiative of Yosif Benchev Tonov. It existed until 1923 but reopened again in 1927. A middle school opened in 1921; Toma Yosifov Tonov was its principal and founder and teachers Georgi Tomov Vulov and Petko Georgiev worked at the school. The Zhetvarka (Bulgarian: Жетварка, 'Harvestwoman') Agrarian Cooperative (Bulgarian: Kooperaciya), opened in 1922. Toma Yosifov was its founder and longest-serving director. An obrok (Christian shrine) was erected near the village in 1923, which soon decayed and disappeared. During the coup of 1923 many members and supporters of the previously ruling Agrarian Union were prosecuted, arrested and fired from their jobs. In the 1930s the people of Petrevene were involved in fierce conflict, even involving fistfights, with the neighboring village of Todorochene for farmland.

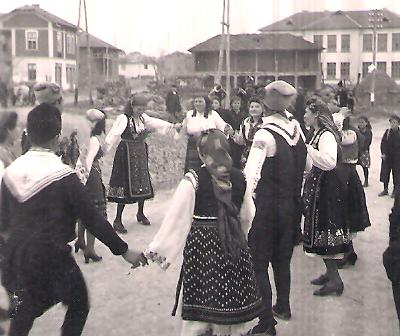
A wedding folk dance "horo" on the main square of Petrevene, 1940s

In 1927 the Agrarian Cooperative was renamed to Zhetvarka Cooperative Bank, with Toma Yosifov as director (until 1962) and Todor Dikov as chairman. On the initiative of Toma Yosifov, in 1937 the Cooperative Bank built a modern-for-the-time winery, an industrial incubator with a chicken nursery—the best in the Balkans for the time—a dairy farm, chicken farm, cattle farm, pig farm, sheep farm, consumer stores, bakery, cooperative vineyard, orchard garden, cooperative farmlands of 400 dka and the Mashina manufacturing plant. In 1934 Petrevene had 1209 people, living in 350 houses, five of them Romani. At that time Petrevene used to have several mills, restaurants, stores, bars, painters, shoemakers, ironsmiths and carpenters.

The Zhetvarka Cooperative Bank owned the famous painting Zhetvarka by the celebrated Bulgarian artist Vladimir Dimitrov - Maystora, now at the National Art Gallery in Sofia. The membership of the Cooperative Bank has reached 923 people from Petrevene, the surrounding villages of Rumyancevo (former Blăsnichevo), Zlatna Panega, Todorichene, Belentzi, Karlukovo, Dăben, Oreshene, and also from other places like Sofia and Plovdiv.

The "new" school (now closed)

The Cooperative winery also processed the grapes from the surrounding villages of Todorichene, Belenci and Karlukovo, and has exported its wine even to Germany. In 1942 Petrevene won the title of an Exemplary Village of the Kingdom of Bulgaria. The Bateriya plant in Sofia, as well as many Sofia inhabitants, were evacuated to Petrevene after the Anglo-American bombardments of Sofia in 1943-1944 during the Second World War. At the time, local entrepreneur Nako Pavlov opened a plant for producing plumbing parts, ovens, etc. During the events of September 1944 many members and supporters of the previous government were prosecuted, arrested and fired from their jobs.

=== The Socialist period (1944–1989) ===
After the Second World War Petrevene was included in the Lovech District of P. R. Bulgaria. In 1946 it had 1254 inhabitants. In 1948, during the communist rule in Bulgaria, a compulsory collectivization of the farmlands was imposed and a Collective Farm, TKZS (Bulgarian: ТКЗС) was established with Ivan Lakov as its first chairman. Petrevene's farmlands became collectively farmed and managed, and its agricultural capacity increased and became modernized. Twenty percent of the fields were allotted to the villagers for their own personal cultivation, but they were still required to work in the TKZS on the main fields. A system was set up where every farmer was entitled to four tons of wheat for personal consumption per year. Four tons being too much to consume or use, the farmers were then encouraged to return two tons to the newly built TKZS bakery in exchange for coupons entitling them to two loaves of black bread and one loaf of white bread a day.

A manufacturing plant (called the Promkombinat) was founded by the Zhetvarka Cooperative Bank. In 1950 the bank was renamed Zhetvarka All-purpose Cooperative. The Promkombinat employed 100 people. In 1955 it produced 2572 Pernik-style ovens. In 1956, by the order of the local authorities and despite the local population's disagreement and resistance, the Promkombinat was closed. Its equipment and machinery were moved to the town of Lukovit. The reason for this action was to increase the number of the people working in the TKZS. In fact, most of the employees in the Promkombinat, together with their families, moved away from the village to other localities in the region instead of enrolling in the TKZS. The population of Petrevene in 1956 was 1183 people.

The railroad from the town of Cherven Bryag to the Zlatna Panega cement factory was arranged and designed to pass through Lukovit and Petrevene in 1965 by Petrevene native, engineer Vasil Tonev of Sofia, Chairman of the Division for New Railroads in Bulgaria. A new rail stop was built not far from the village (now defunct). As in the whole surrounding region, Roma people, often referred to as Gypsies, were settled in Petrevene in the 1960s. Their arrival extended the functioning of the school, which had experienced a decline in enrollment at the time as more inhabitants left Petrevene for urban areas.

=== After the democratic changes (1989–present) ===
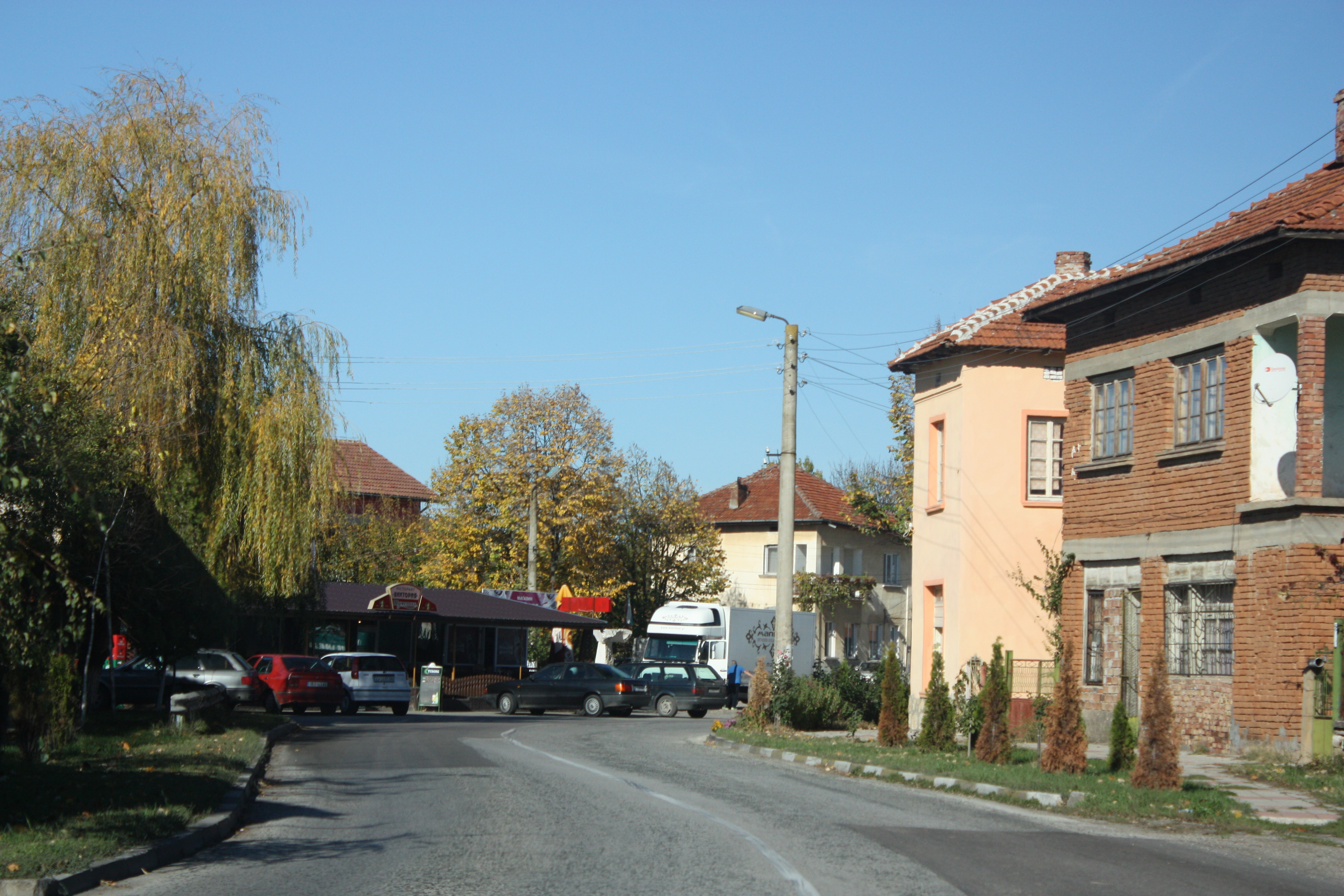
The road E-83 in Petrevene

After the democratic changes of 1989 in Bulgaria, Petrevene remained within the Lovech District of the Republic of Bulgaria. The TKZS was closed (unlike other nearby villages which kept theirs and privatized them), and became derelict. Petrevene's agricultural output and capacity were reduced severely. The collectivized farmfields were then divided as they were prior to the collectivization and returned to their original owners or their heirs. However, many villagers chose to retire and became state retirees instead of making their living on the farmlands.

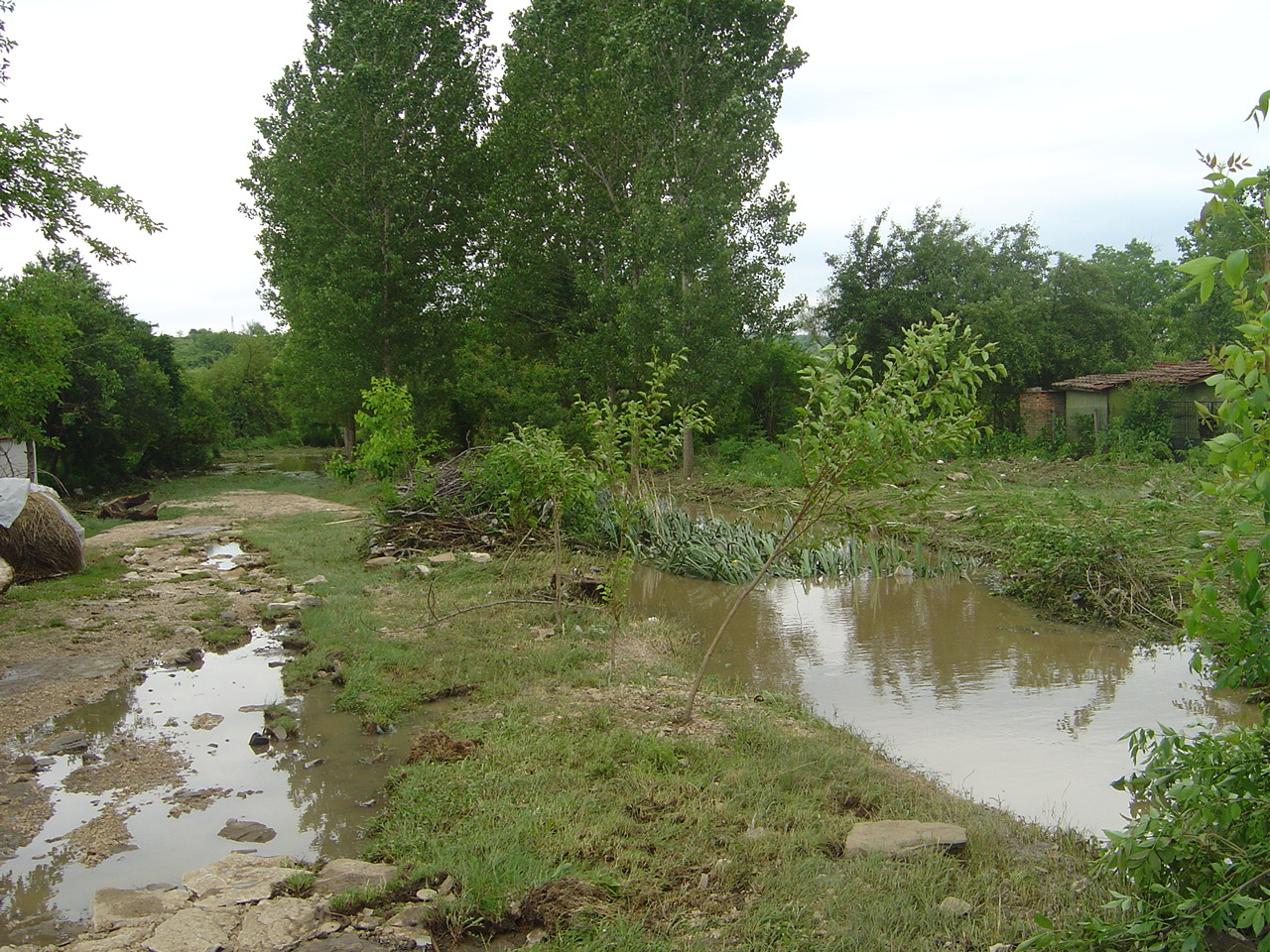
Dulǎt after earlier heavy floods in 2005

During post-communist Bulgaria many young Petrevene families moved to larger cities to seek better employment opportunities. As a result, many farm fields and vineyards that had previously dominated the landscape became abandoned and uncultivated, and the village's population shrank rapidly. Additionally due to the economic crisis that followed and very low state pensions, many owners were unable to afford the upkeep of their homes and many houses fell into disrepair.

A new obrok (Christian shrine) at the location of the previous one was erected in 2012. A group for folklore songs, Petrevchanka, was founded at the Ivan Stefanov-1918 Community Cultural Center. In 2011 Petrevene had 598 inhabitants.

Recently, with Bulgaria's overall economic growth, Petrevene has experienced a revival as well as re-cultivation of many farmlands. Additionally increased incomes mean that many people could afford to improve their homes. There have also been several commercial developments spurred by a competent administration, including the establishment of a new bakery, Lazarov Commers, and a motorbike rally.

In August 2005, as well as the rest of Bulgaria, Petrevene experienced heavy flooding. As a result, the drainage canal and the river tributary Dulǎt was widened, dredged and in more central areas covered over in concrete blocks to protect from erosion and to ease future floods. This was achieved by using money from the EU Solidarity Fund which at the time had allocated 106 million euros to aid during the crisis.

After Bulgaria joined the European Union in 2007, some villagers were able to benefit from the SAPARD program for agricultural and rural development, and as of April 2009 some parts of the TKZS have been restored to working order. Furthermore, the Dulǎt tributary now has two new bridges across it, both built in 2008.

== Culture and traditions ==
A 110-year-old building, recently renovated by the owner. It is a good example of the large amount of historically well preserved but under threat houses in the village

With the massive collectivization of 1956, the village became an agricultural community. Besides the Eastern Orthodox Church of the Dormition of the Theotokos, and the Ivan Stefanov-1918 Community Cultural Center and library, Petrevene harbors many historical buildings from the late 19th and early 20th centuries, with some buildings dating as far back as the 18th century. However many of these buildings are now decrepit and derelict as the village population shrunk heavily during the post-communist era, with many owners either moving to larger cities and leaving their land behind, or simply dying out due to old age and leaving their property to descendants who were unwilling or unable to maintain it.

=== Watermelon Day ===
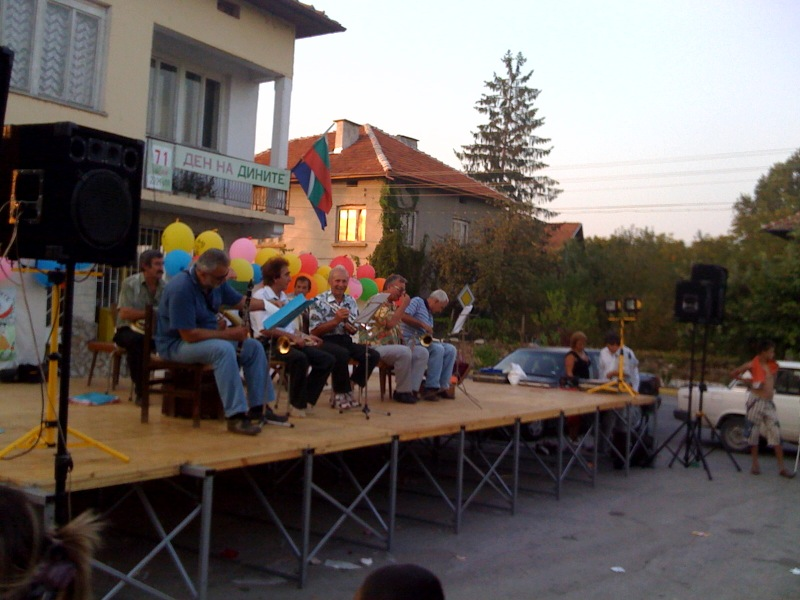
Watermelon Day fest: A local band performs traditional folk songs

Watermelon Day is a popular annual festivity in Petrevene which is celebrated every year on the penultimate Saturday of August. It was first held in 1936 and it is a popular belief within the village that it started off as a regional land dispute between Petrevene and the nearby village of Todorichene. The legend, according to the local people, is that several bad harvests had impelled the Petrevenians to place claims on lands of Todorichene. To settle the dispute that followed, a regional judge was brought in from Pleven to settle the matter. He declared that everyone should be assigned 1.5 square kilometres (0.58 sq mi) of land. With the lack of wheat, the Petrevenians decided to plant watermelon instead. With no market for them, however, the younger men of the village decided to collect all the watermelons and store them in the schoolhouse and let anyone eat as much as they wanted for free, on the condition that they would first see caricaturist Nicola Velev's exhibition in the library. Although popular, the story has little historical merit. Although there have been records of Watermelon Day going as far back as 1936, no existing records tell of bad harvests in the years prior to that date or of the above-mentioned land divisions.

=== Religion ===
See also History

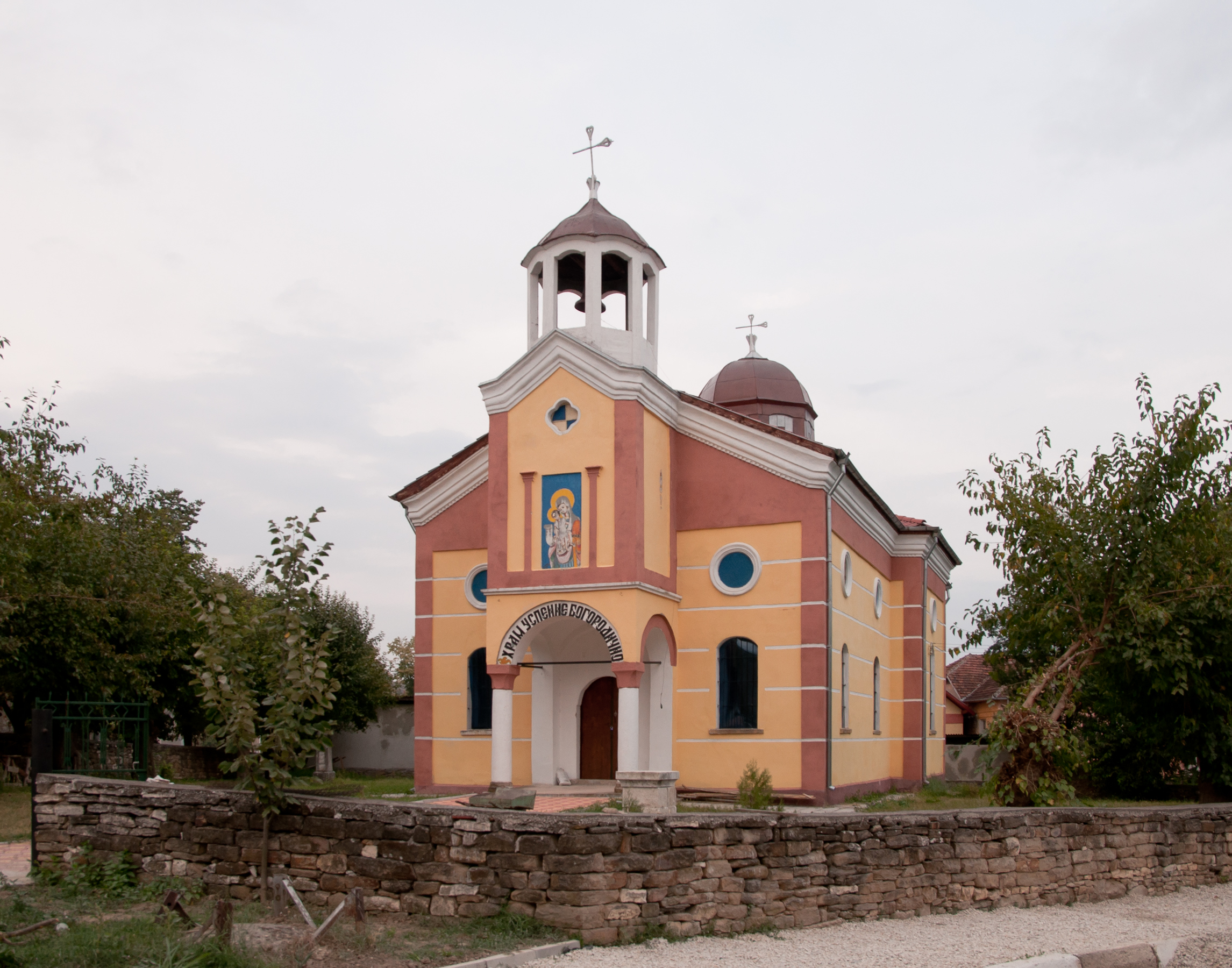
Dormition of the Theotokos Church in Petrevene, built in 1902

The present day Eastern Orthodox church of the Dormition of the Theotokos was built in 1902. In 2009 the church, having fallen into disrepair, underwent an extensive renovation funded by the Ministry of Disasters and Accidents, (now known as the Ministry of Emergency Situations), with a total of €104,000 being released to the local government. The village shrine, or obrok (Bulgarian: оброк), was also restored in 2009. The obrok was a holy Christian site, used in the past as a meeting point for the village elders to congregate. It is located at one of the highest points surrounding the village, so as to have been as close to God as possible. The original obrok was first erected in 1923, and was made of stone. The new obrok is constructed from steel, except for the structure's bell, which is made from copper and was the village's church's original bell.

=== Art gallery ===
A limestone memorial to Petrevene's casualties in the First and Second World Wars, as well as the Balkan Wars, was unveiled on August 23, 2003. It lists the 26 citizens of Petrevene who died between 1912 and 1945.

A 2008 National Academy of Art incentive has seen the introduction of two new sculptures to Petrevene at the two ends of the village along the road E83 Sofia-Pleven. They were designed and constructed by two students of the academy, Ivan Stoyanov and Valko Bekirski.

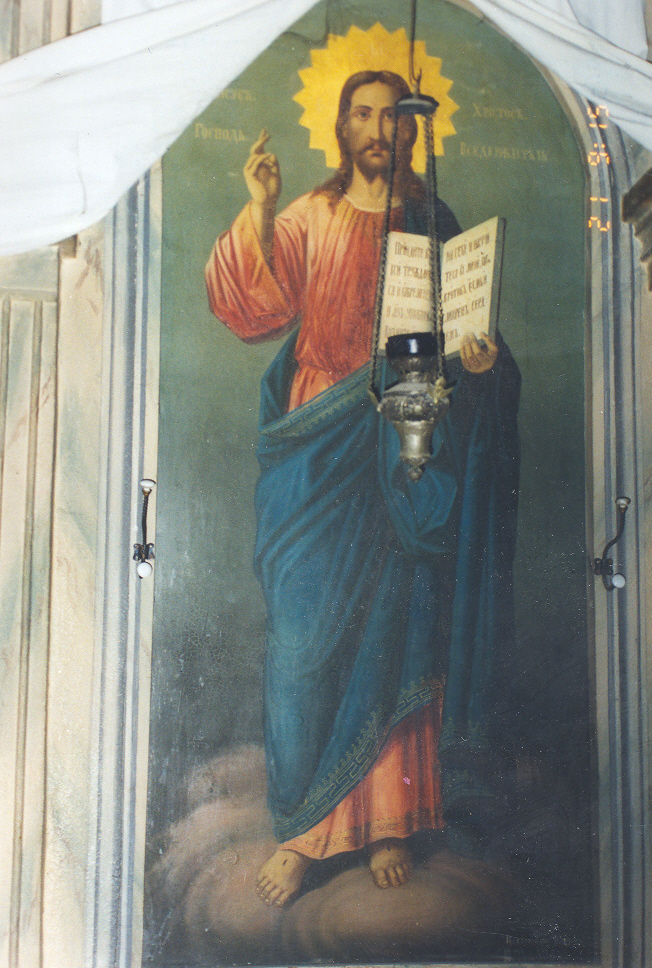
Iconostasis icon of the Petrevene church. Gift by a local, 1901

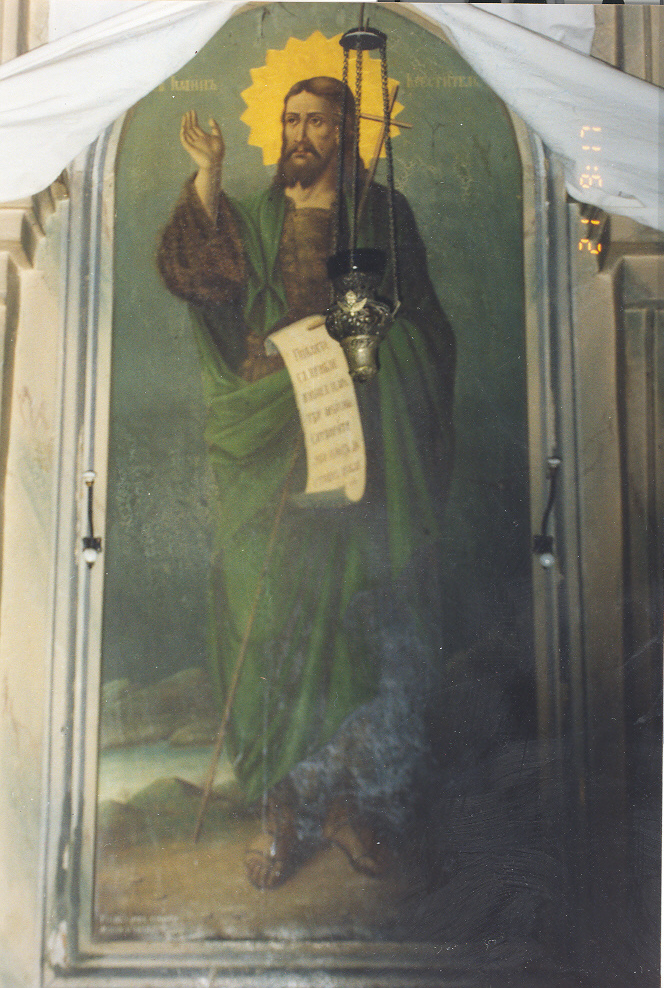
Iconostasis icon of the Petrevene church. Gift by a local, 1901

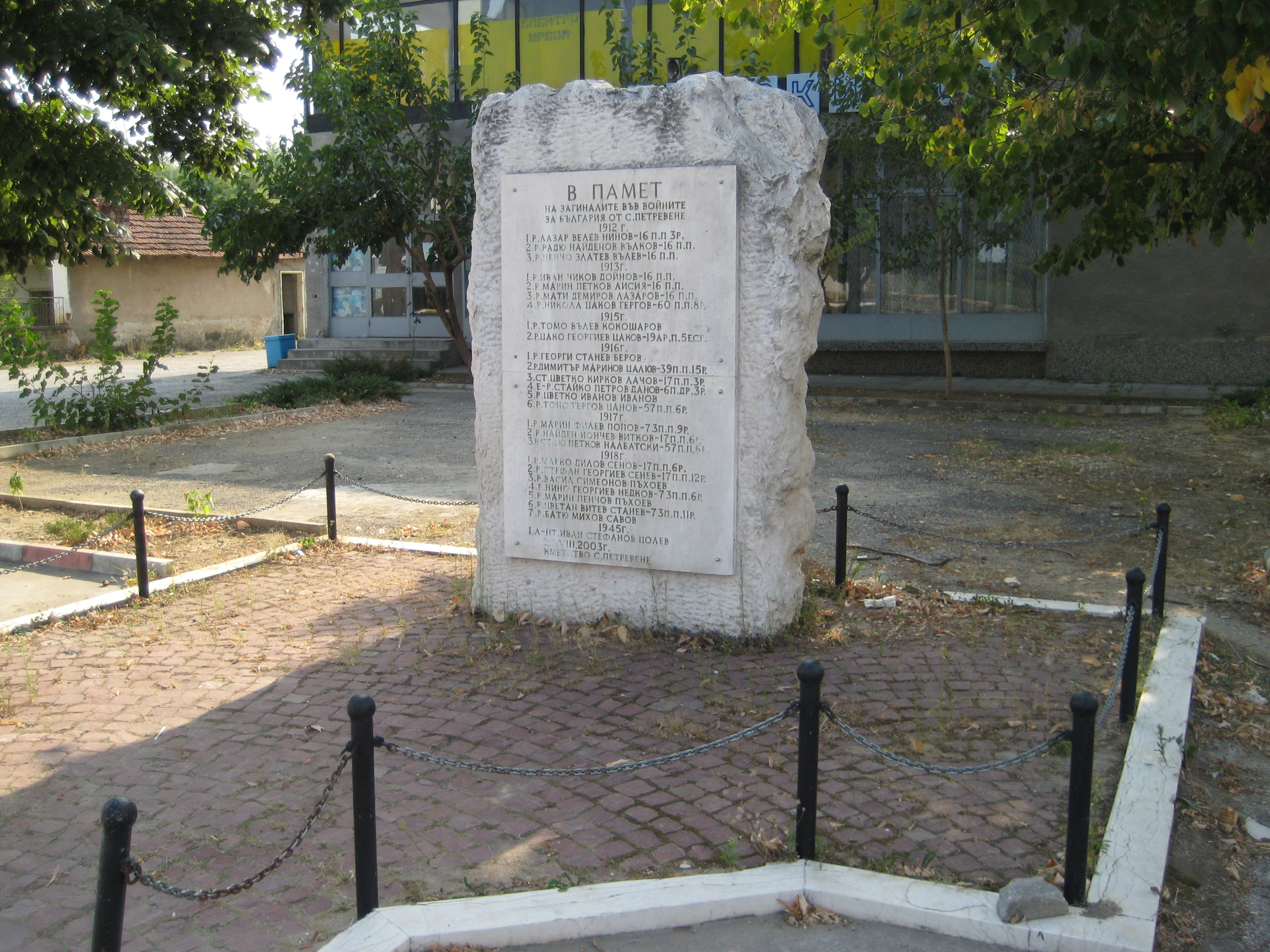
A monolithic limestone monument in commemoration of those who died in the name of Bulgaria between 1912 and 1945; unveiled in 2003.

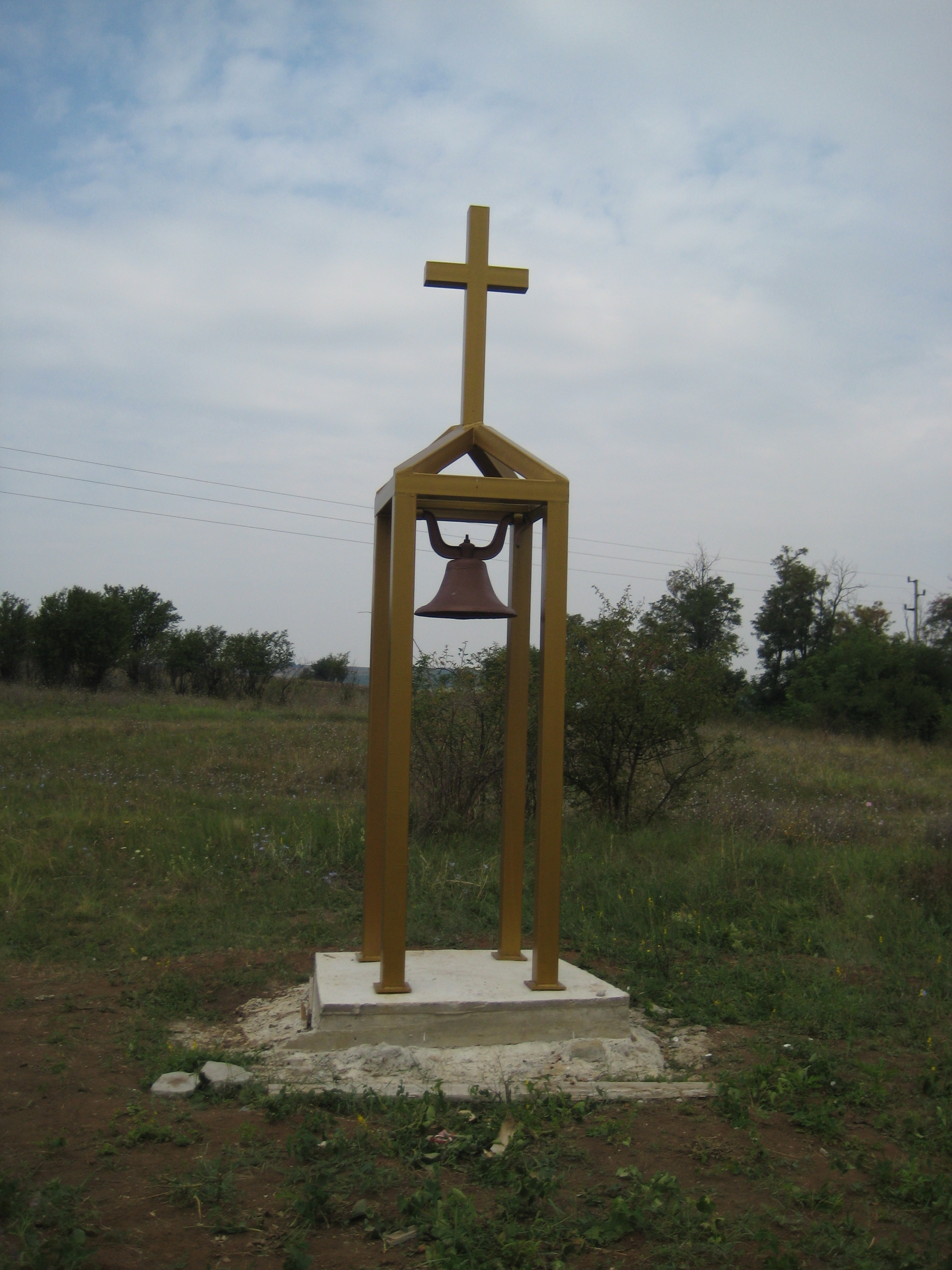
The renewed obrok of Perevene, 2009

One of two National Academy of Art Statues, located on the E-83 road as you enter Petrevene, traveling to Lukovit.

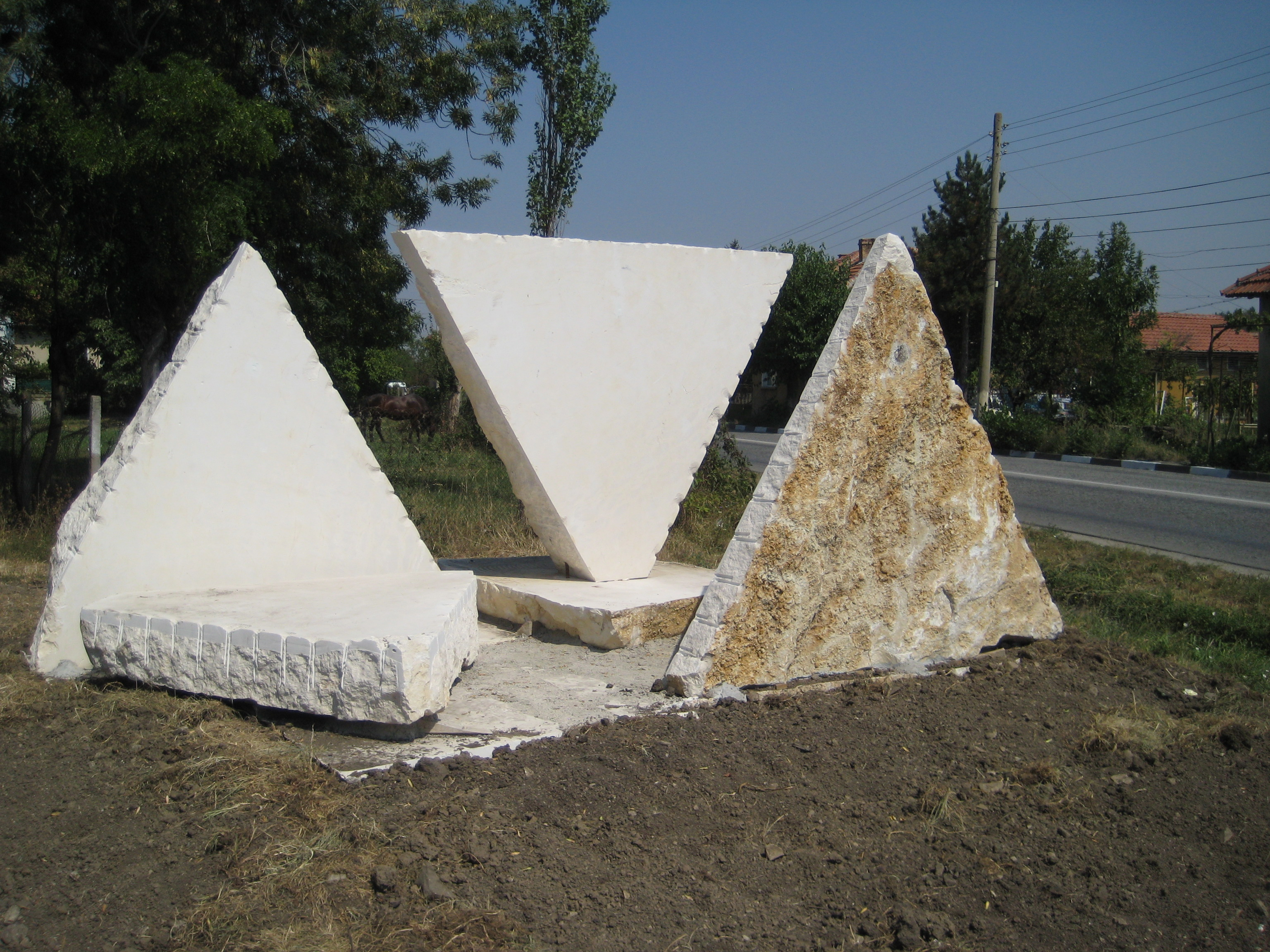
Second sculpture, located on the E-83 road as you leave Petrevene.

== Notable persons ==
- Tono Benchev Bakov (1835–1911) – member of the Vidrare Revolutionary Committee founded by Vasil Levski in 1869, the first mayor of Petrevene after the restoration of the Bulgarian Statehood (1878–1894).
- Toma Yosifov (1897–1963) – founder of the Chicken Farmers Union in Bulgaria and of the Bulgarian Agrarian Youth Union (Bulgarian: ЗМС) in the region.
- Yosif Benchev (1895–1973) – founder and leader of the Union of the Bulgarian Front-Fighters (1918–1944) (founded in 1931 in Pleven, closed by the authorities in 1934, reopened in 1944, finally closed in 1948), exiled in 1948 to Petrevene
- Vasil Kolev (Michmana), born 1904 – political émigré in the USSR, who was persecuted and disappeared there; rehabilitated in 1956
- Eng. Vasil Tonev (1906–1991) – Chairman of the Division for New Railroad Lines in Bulgaria, one of the designers and creators of the contemporary railroad system in Bulgaria
- Radoslav Radulov (Tzuri) (1931–2000) – travel representative (attache) at the Embassies of Bulgaria in Belgium and Canada

== Document gallery ==
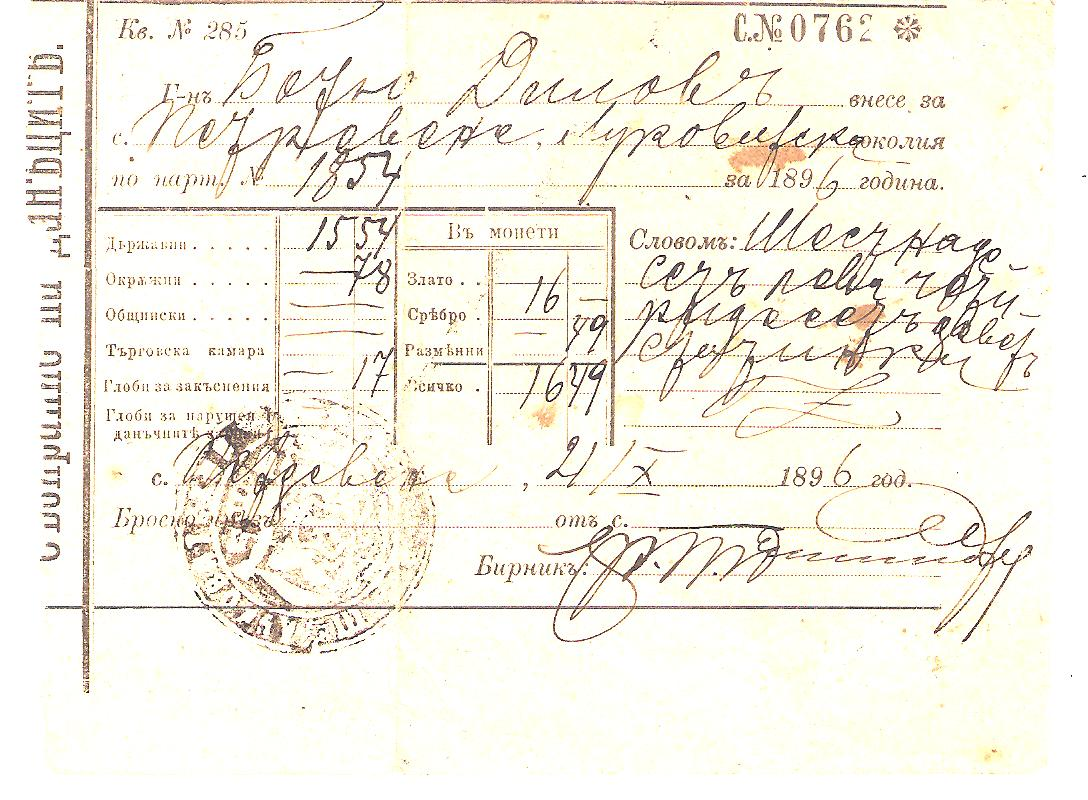
Petrevene tax receipt, 1896

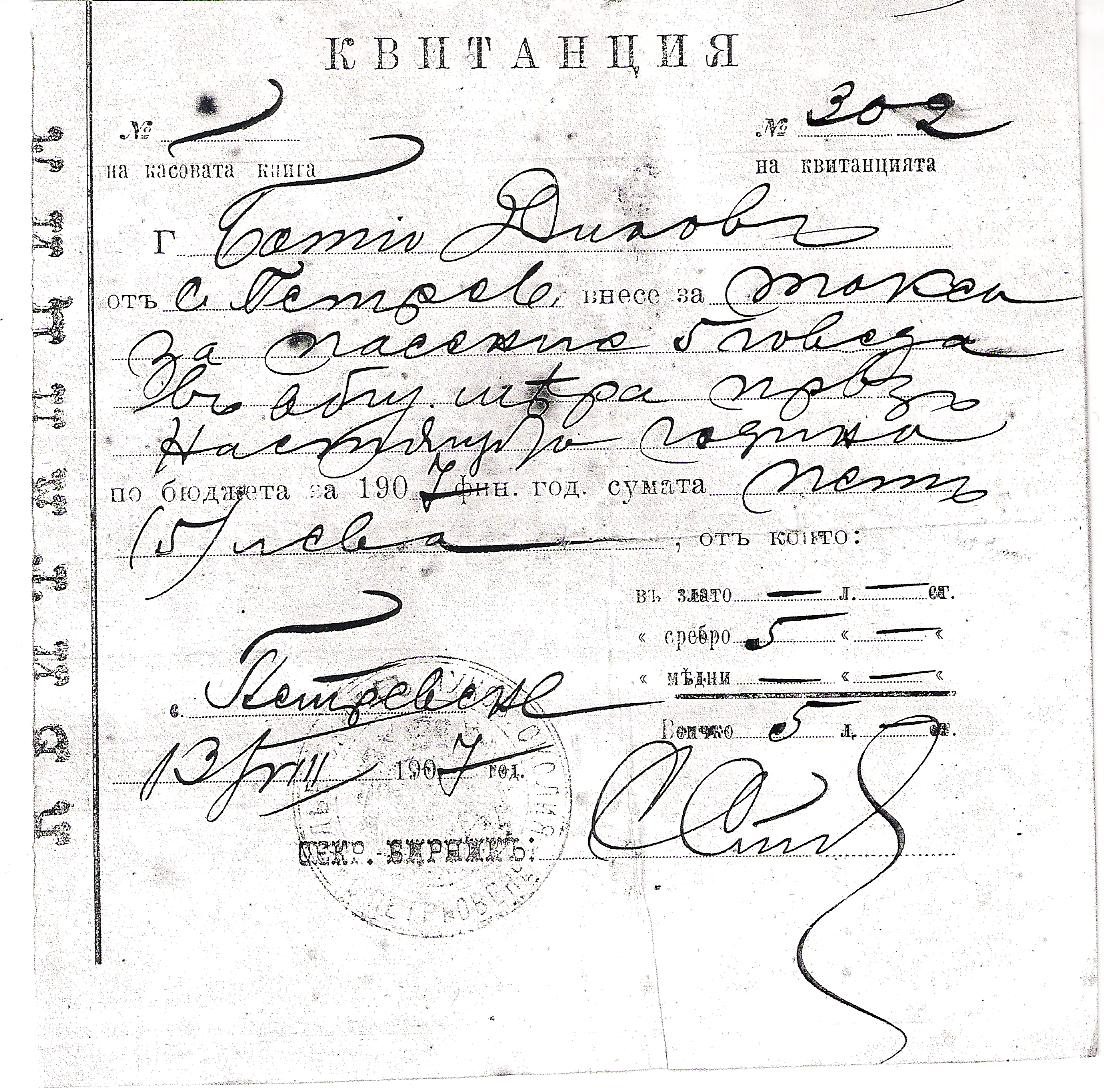
Receipt for pasturing calves in the Petrevene community lawn, 1907

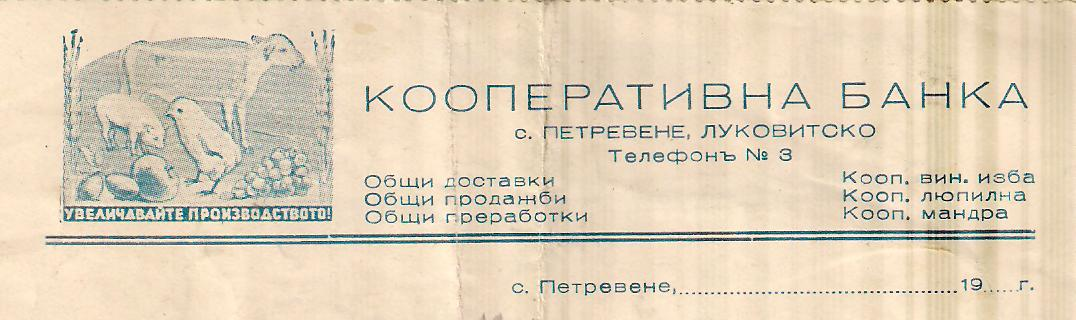
Stationary of the Cooperative Bank of Petrevene, 1930s

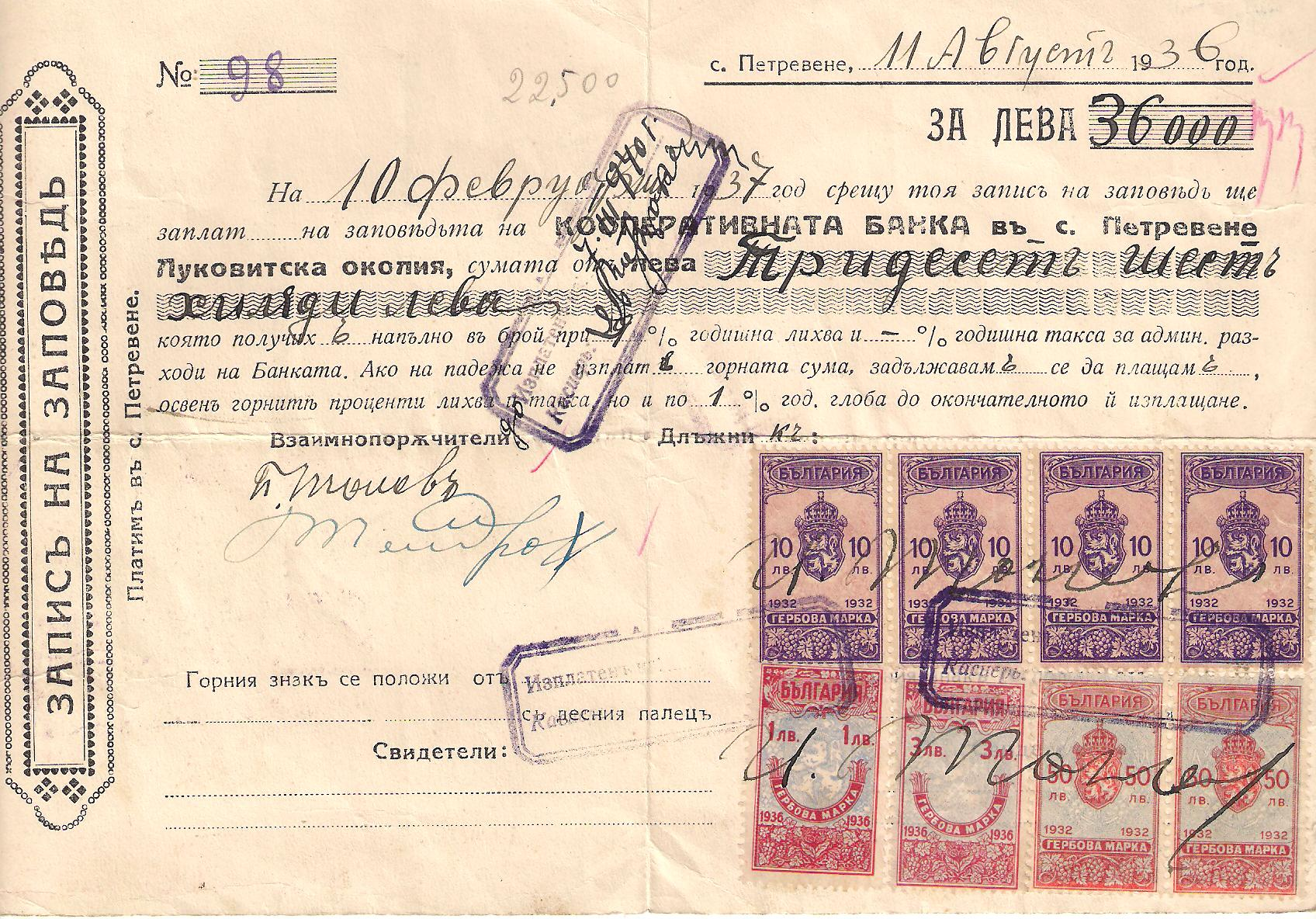
Loan document issued by the Bank of Petrevene, 1936

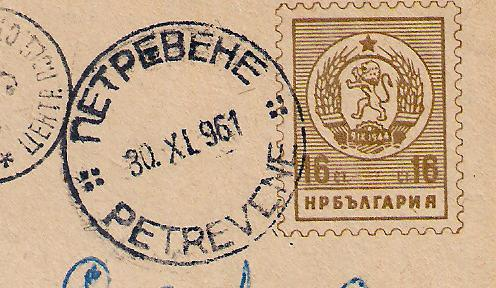
Petrevene postal seal, 1961

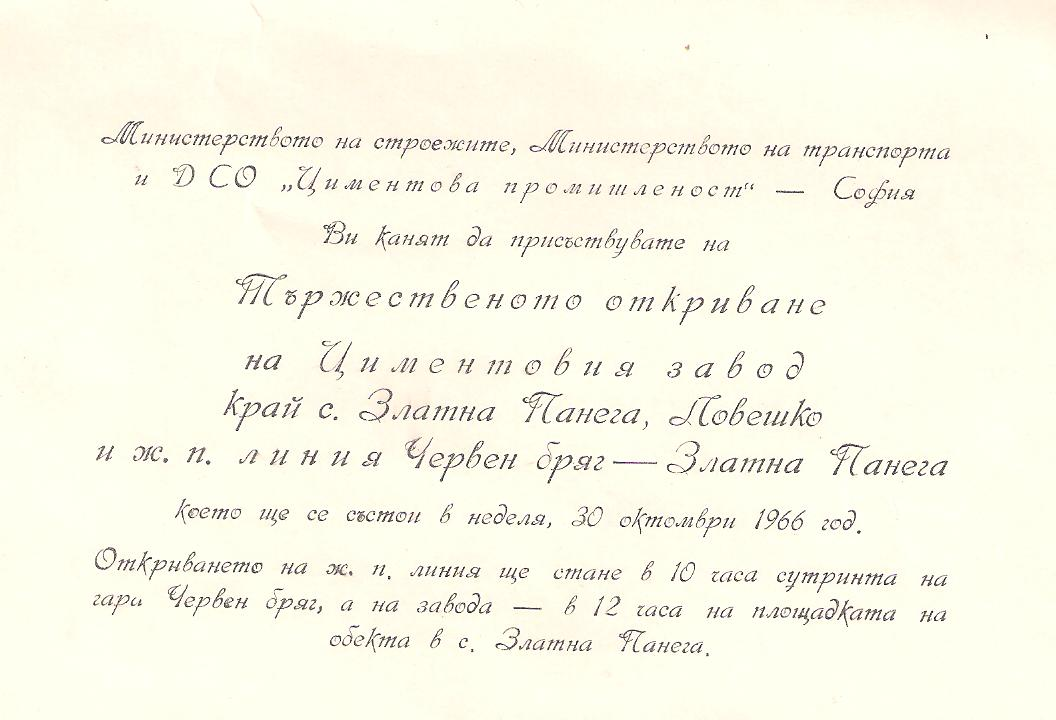
Invitation for the inauguration of the Cement plant in Zl. Panega and the newly built railroad from Ch. Bryag to Zl. Panega, 1966

== See also ==
- Lukovit
- Lovech
- Teteven
- Pleven
- Pomaks
