= Iskar–Panega Geopark =

UNESCO-run Geopark in Northern Bulgaria

Geological Park Iskar–Panega is an UNESCO-run Geopark in Northern Bulgaria, located 3 km south of the municipal centre Lukovit. It consists of two sections: the Karlukovo Karst Complex (43°11′14″N 24°4′22″E) lies in the valley of the Iskar River, while the Roadside Landscape Park "Panega" (43°11′25″N 24°9′8″E) is at the Zlatna Panega valley. Started in 2006, it became the first geopark in Bulgaria, and created temporary employment for 20 previously unemployed people. Another economic effect was that the number of overnights at main lodging facilities in Lukovit increased by 40%, and the number of visits to the city and region rose significantly.

Geopark Iskar–Panega Project was implemented with the financial support of the PHARE Program (Development of Bulgarian Ecotourism). The main objective of the program was to provide technical and financial support for improvement of the quality of the priority sector of ecotourism in Bulgaria and contribute to raising its competitiveness.

== Formation ==
Geopark Iskar–Panega Project was implemented with the financial support of the PHARE Program "Development of Bulgarian Ecotourism" BG 0202.02/ESC/G/DBET. The main objective of the program was to provide technical and financial support for improvement of the quality of the priority sector of ecotourism in Bulgaria and contribute to raising its competitiveness. The beneficiary is the Municipality of Lukovit.

== Results ==
The main result of the project was the development of the first Geopark in Bulgaria encompassing different natural and historical landmarks located on the territory of the Municipality of Lukovit. As a result of the project the development of the municipality as tourist destination is a fact, geotourism was promoted as a factor for socio-economic development, the competitiveness of the tourist industry in the region and the attractiveness of this natural heritage tourism area were raised. As a result of project activities a temporary employment was ensured for 20 unemployed people, the number of overnights at main lodging facilities increased (with over 40%) and the number of visits of the city and the region rose significantly.

== Activities ==
The project activities included the development of tourist infrastructure at the territory of Geopark "Iskar–Panega" (wooden bridges, summer houses, and stairs, shelters and picnic sites, platforms) which ensured access for tourists to natural landmarks of national importance and different attractive karts forms. The tourist infrastructure and the tracing of paths created tourist routes of different lengths, through which the tourist is navigated by a system of orientation boards. To make tourist routes more attractive, a non-verbal animation (through information boards) of main sites were made. An assessment of the potential and a marketing strategy were developed to ensure proper management and popularization of the new tourist product. The project also developed and equipped a Balkan Centre of Speleology, in which with prior request, tourists can learn more scientific and curious information about objects in the Geopark from representatives of the local Speleological Club or from specialists from the Bulgarian federation of speleology. During the project first steps for positioning the product were at the tourist market through advertising, meetings with media and local community and other interested parties were organized.

== Goals ==
To establish the first geopark in Bulgaria as a tool for promoting the national geotourism potential at European level through the European Networks of Geoparks;
To create an integrated tourist product based on the mosaic of various national landmarks from karst regions in the Municipality of Lukovit;
To raise the attractiveness of natural heritage while at the same time promoting sustainable tourism development and preserving natural resources for future generations;
To broadly promote the created tourist product and develop a marketing strategy for its further popularization in the long run and to larger target groups;
To stimulate entrepreneurship in the tourism sector and coordinate the interests of public authorities, local communities and private entities in the region.

== Sustainability ==
For a period of one year after project completion the Geopark Iskar–Panega destination will be managed by Municipality of Lukovit. For ensuring additional services that are offered the Municipality works in partnership with the "Unique nature" foundation, Lukovit, Speleological club "Petar Tranteev", Lukovit, and Club for Extreme Sports "Adrenalin". To raise the sustainability of the project, the municipality will continue maintain the infrastructure and will take care for its development and improvement through the development of public–private partnership, whose main purpose will be in a midterm period to prepare the candidature of the Geopark for membership in the European Network of Geoparks. This will significantly raise the image of the destination, the interest to it and its visitation.

== Overcoming Challenges ==
The extremely sophisticated conditions for the execution of the objects from the tourist infrastructure created difficulties for project implementation. To build the infrastructure according to the working design project and overcome difficulties, alpine method of work were used.

== See also ==
- Prohodna
- List of national geoparks
- Global Geoparks Network
