= Zlatna Panega (river) =

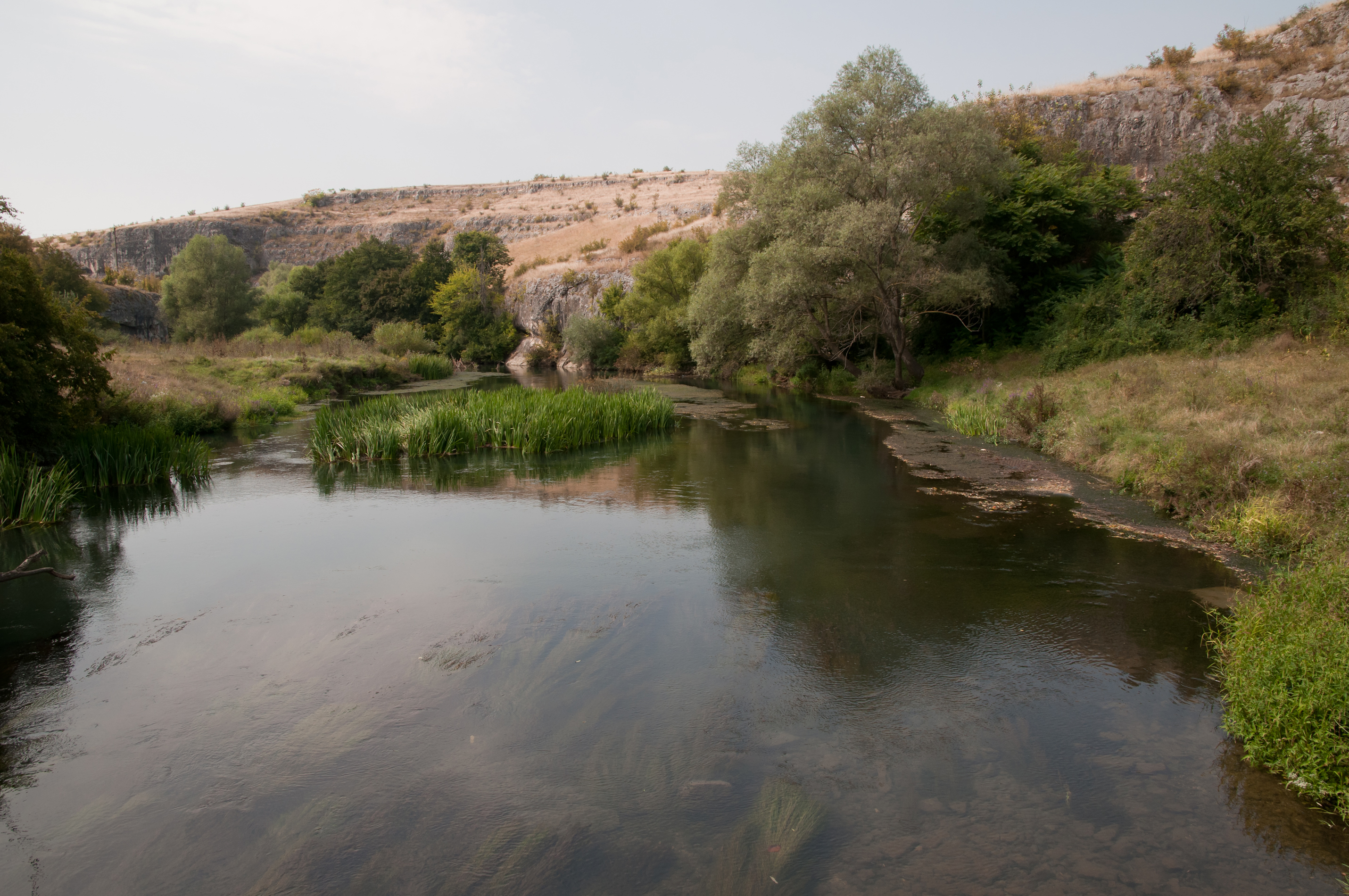

Location
- Country: Bulgaria

Physical characteristics
- Source
  - location: Glava Panega karst spring
  - coordinates: 43°5′18.96″N 24°9′36″E
  - elevation: 188 m (617 ft)
- Mouth
  - location: Iskar
  - coordinates: 43°17′26.88″N 24°4′18.84″E
  - elevation: 94 m (308 ft)
- Length: 50 km (31 mi)
- Basin size: 350 km^{2} (140 sq mi)

Basin features
- Progression: Iskar→ Danube

The Zlatna Panega (Bulgarian: Златна Панега, "golden Panega", also: Panega, old: Paneg, Altǎn Paneg) is a river in western Bulgaria, a right tributary of the river Iskar, itself a right tributary of the Danube, belonging to the Black Sea drainage. Its length is 50 km. Panega Glacier on Livingston Island in the South Shetland Islands, Antarctica is named after the river. Its name is derived from the Greek goddess Panacea.

== Geography ==
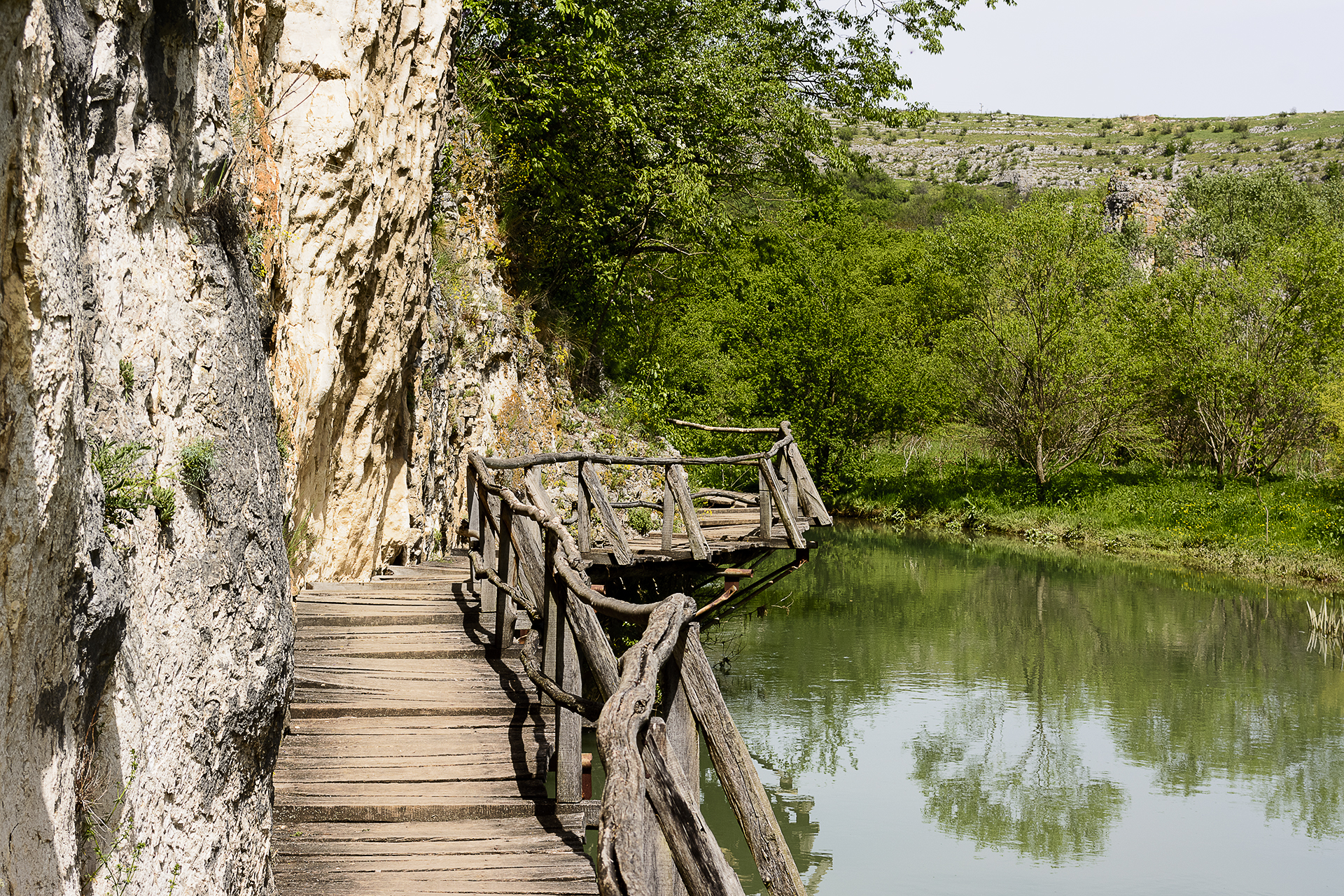
Eco-trail along the river

The river takes its source at an altitude of 188 m from Glava Panega, the second largest karst spring in Bulgaria with an average annual discharge of 2.5 m^{3}/s or 2,500 L/s, situated in the southeastern part of the village of Zlatna Panega. It flows north through the Fore-Balkan, a mountainous and hilly chain straddling north of and in parallel with the Balkan Mountains. It forms a scenic gorge upstream of the town of Lukovit. The river turns northwest at the village of Radomirtsi and in a few kilometers flows into the Iskar at an altitude of 94 m some 850 km northwest of the outskirts of the town of Cherven Bryag.

Its drainage basin covers a territory of 350 km^{2} or 4% of the Iskar's total. Its basin encompasses the entire eastern areas of the Sofia Valley.

It has high water in May and low water in October–November, although the water flow is fairly constant throughout the year due to the karst water feed. The average annual discharge at the village of Petrevene is 4 m^{3}/s.

== Settlements and transportation ==
The Zlatna Panega flows in Lovech and Pleven Provinces. There are nine settlements along its course, two towns and five villages. Within the former province are located Zlatna Panega in Yablanitsa Municipality and Rumyantsevo, Petrevene and Lukovit (town) in Lukovit Municipality. In Pleven Province are Radomirtsi, Ruptsi and Cherven Bryag (town) in Cherven Bryag Municipality. Its waters are utilized for small-scale hydropower generation, as well as for irrigation and industrial supply, including the Titan Zlatna Panega Cement Factory in the homonymous village.

Part of the river course near Lukovit is situated in the Iskar–Panega Geopark, created to foster local tourism and to preserve the geologic and geomorphologic features of the surrounding karst landscape, with several tourist tracks. There are over 700 caves in the region, including the renown Prohodna on the banks of the Iskar, a few kilometers west of the Zlatna Panega.

A 19.8 km stretch of the first class I-3 road Botevgrad–Pleven–Byala follows the river between its source and Radomirtsi. Through its whole length runs a section of railway line No. 22 Cherven Bryag–Zlatna Panega of the Bulgarian State Railways.

== Gallery ==
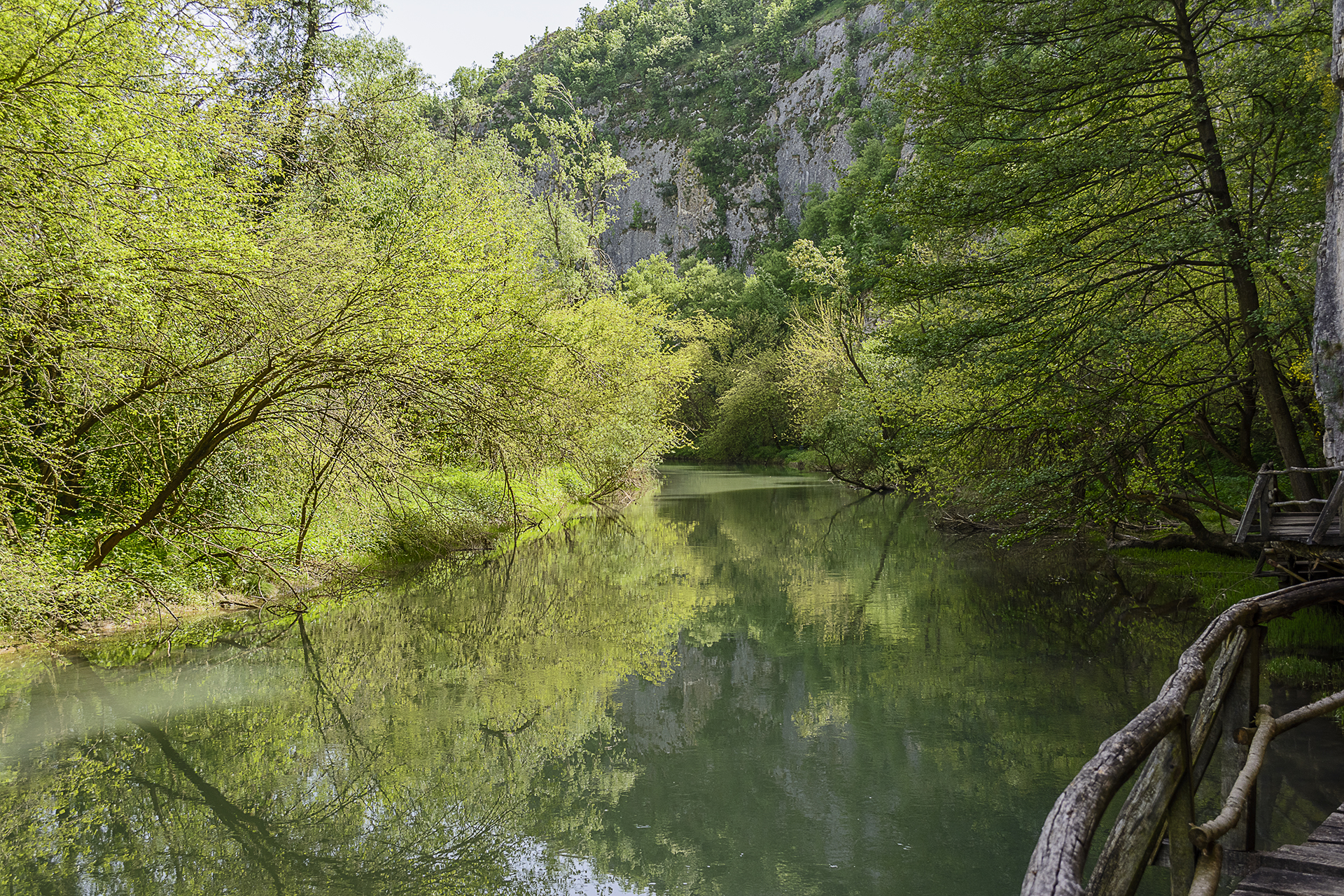

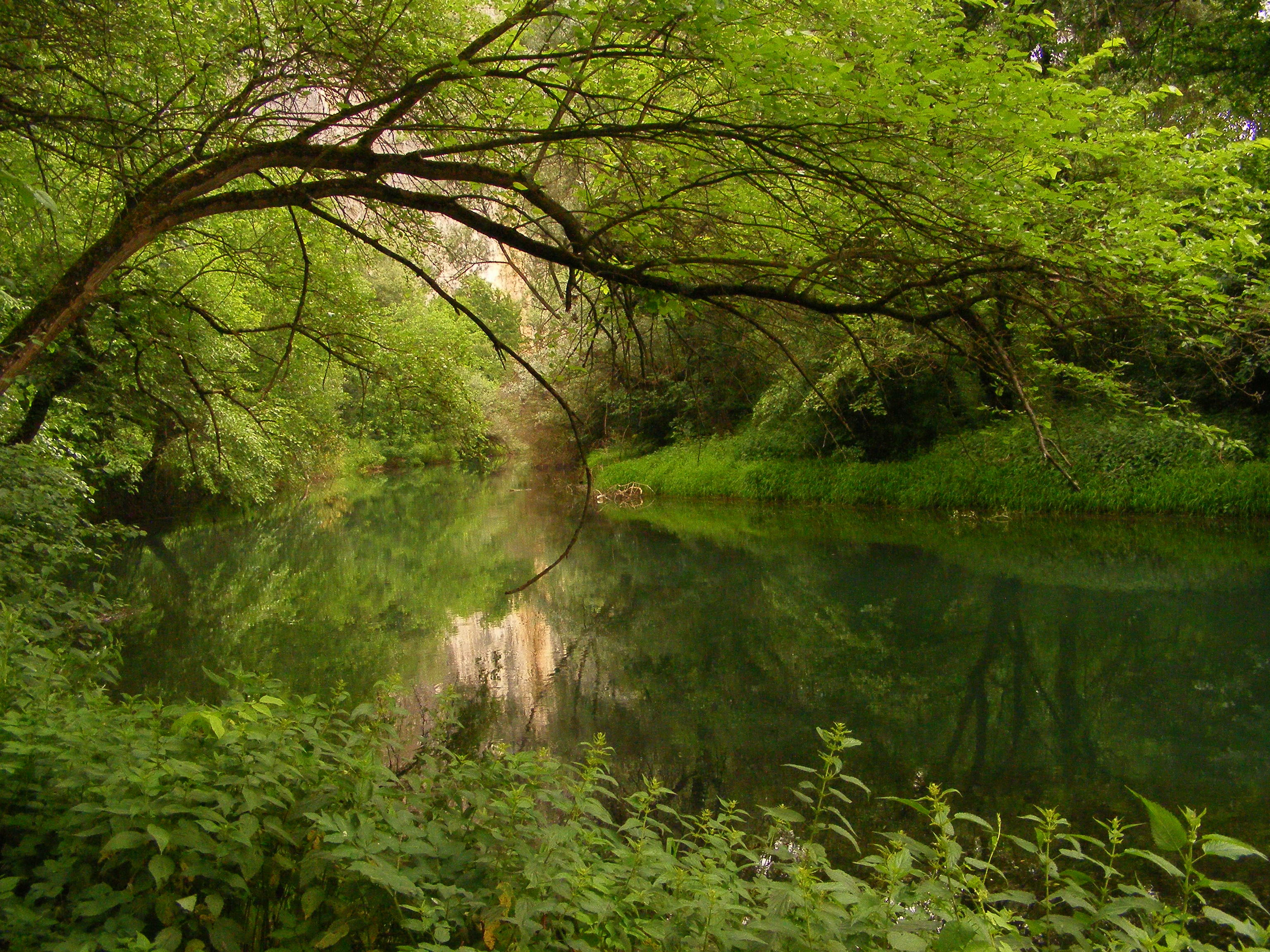

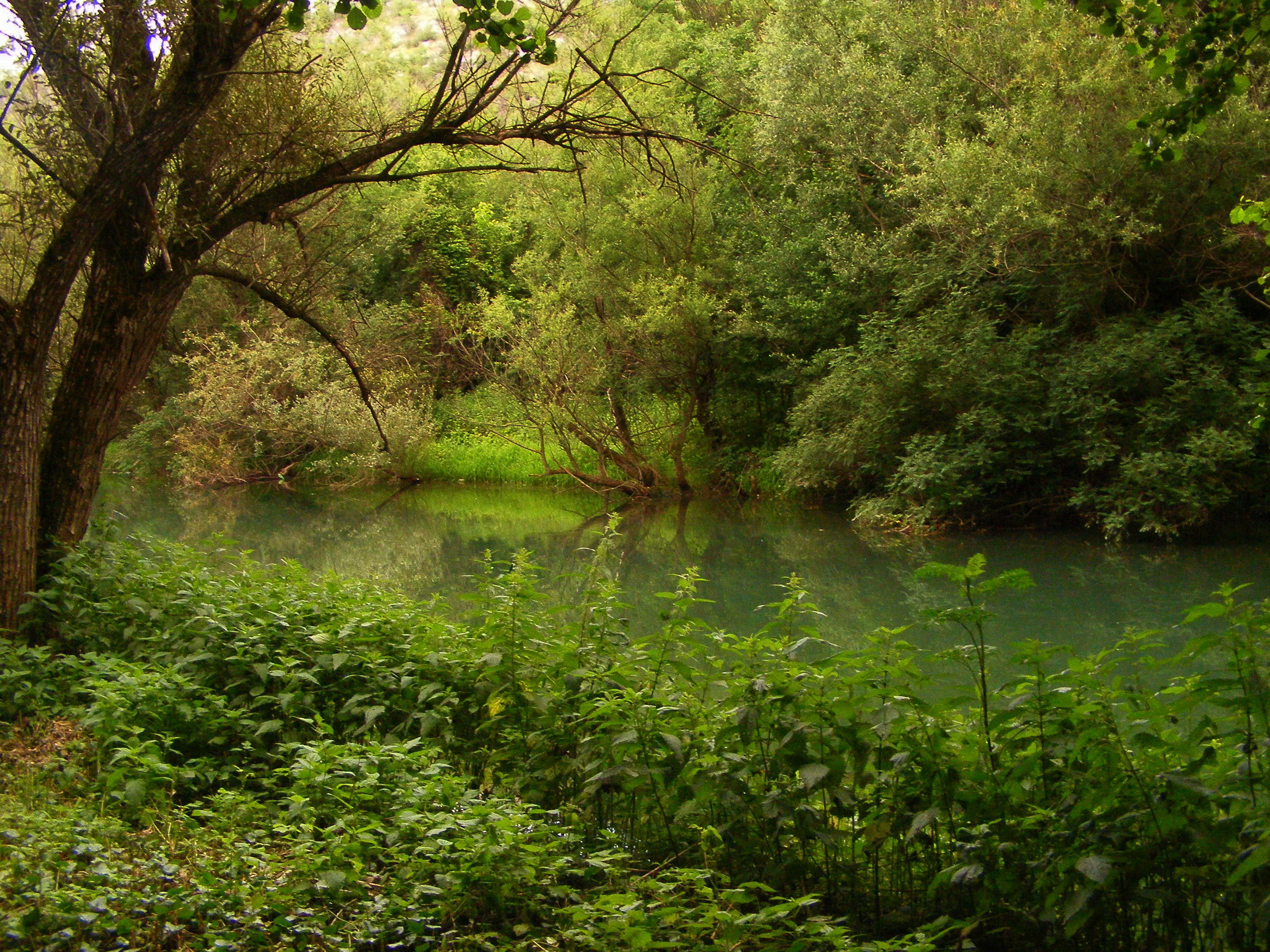

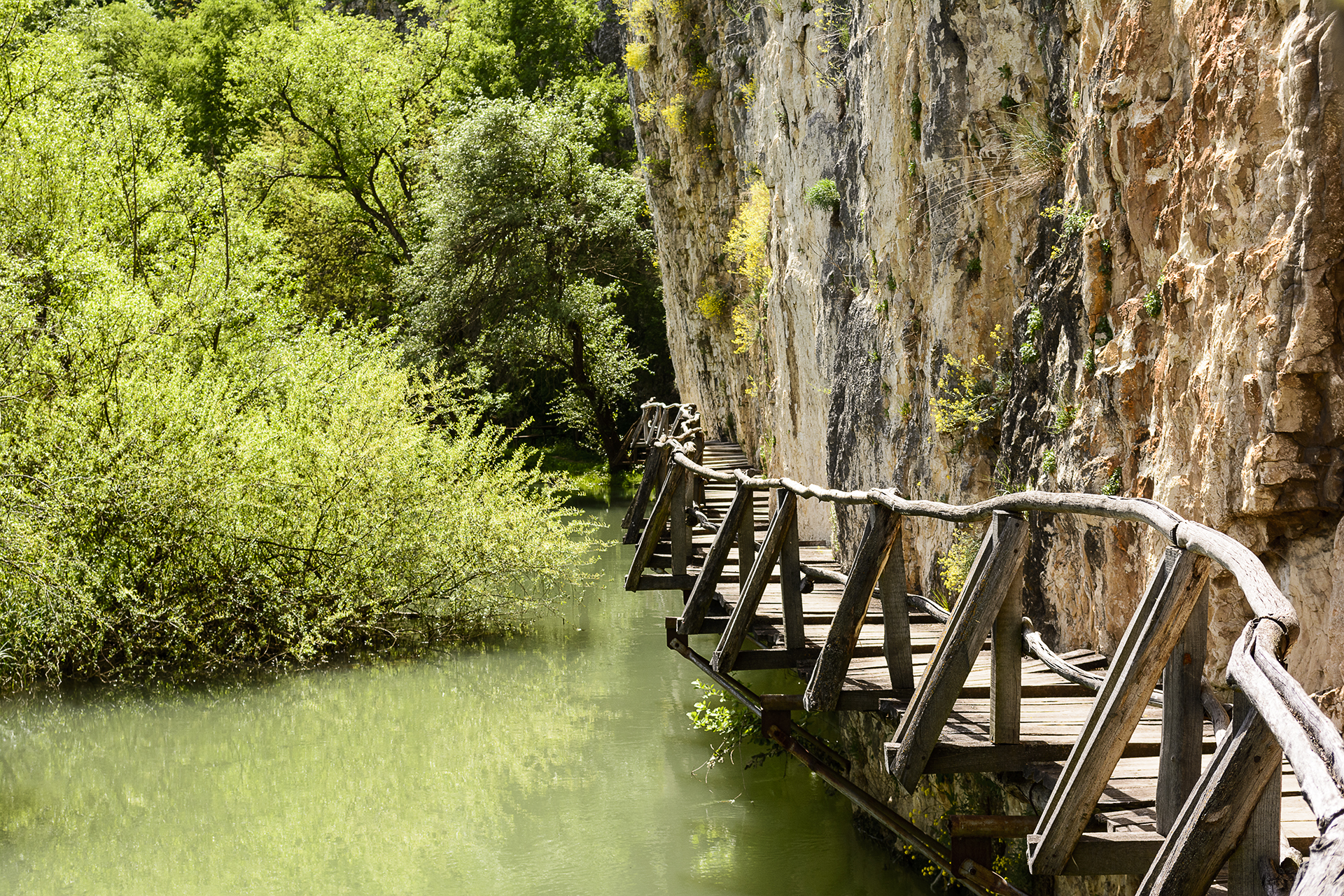
