= Lukovit =

Town in Bulgaria

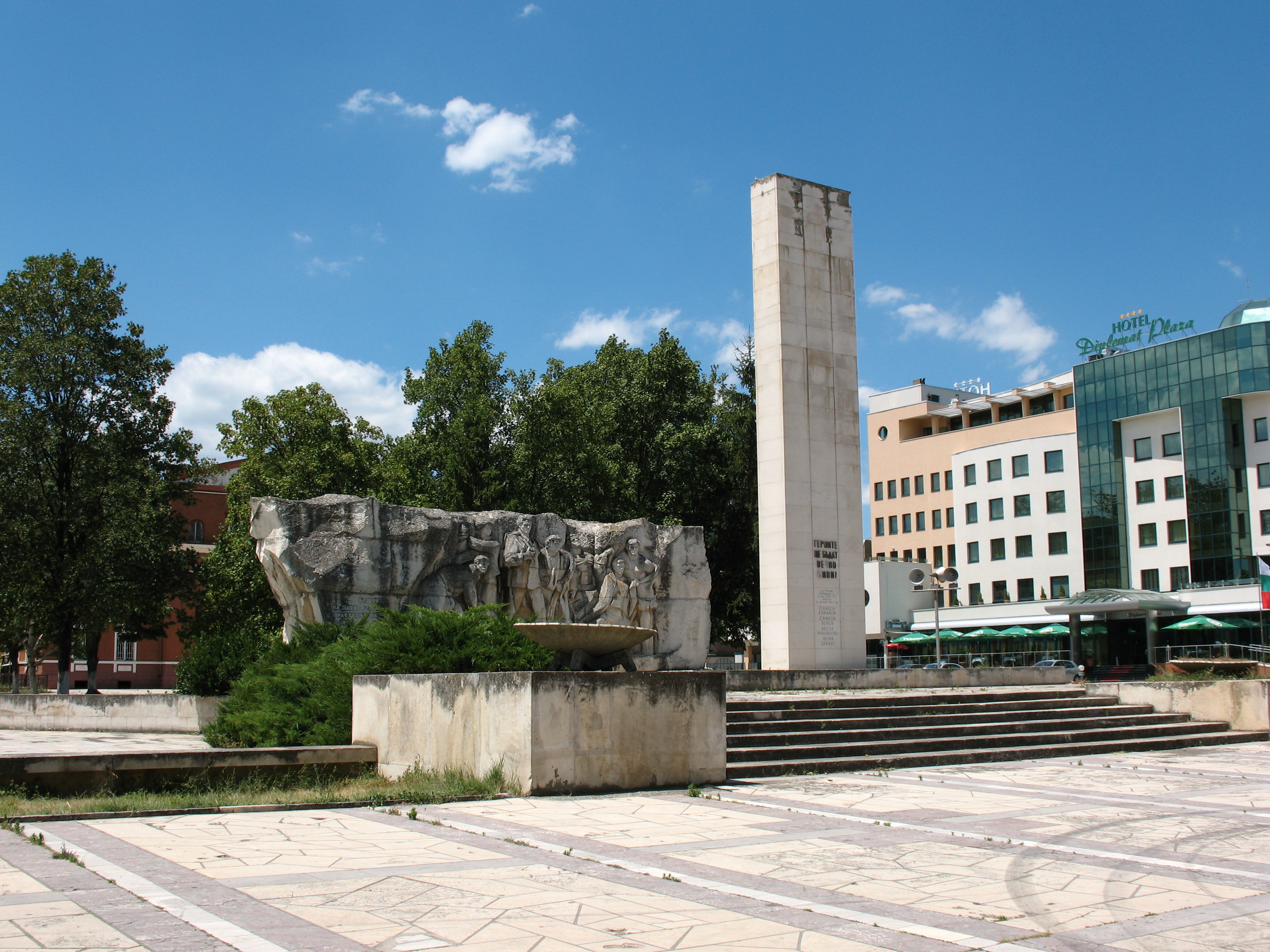

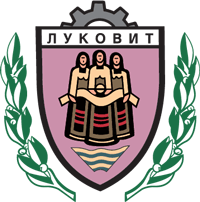
- Coat of arms

- Location of Lukovit
- Coordinates: 43°12′N 24°10′E
- Country: Bulgaria
- Province (Oblast): Lovech

Government
  - Mayor: Ivan Grancharov
- Elevation: 171 m (561 ft)

Population (31.12.2009)
  - City: 9,630
  - Urban: 18,788
- Time zone: UTC+2 (EET)
  - Summer (DST): UTC+3 (EEST)
- Postal Code: 5770
- Area code: 0697

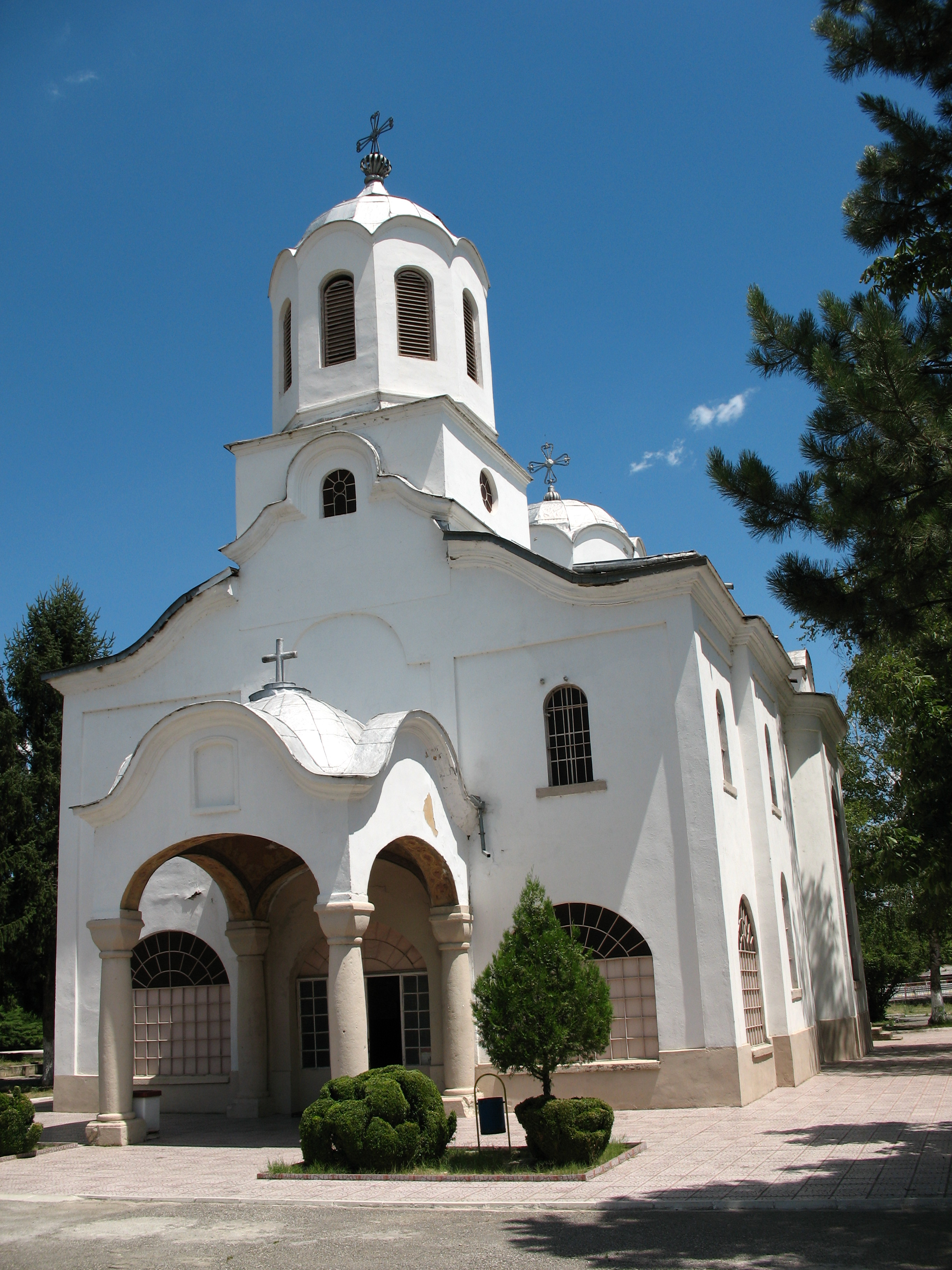
Church in central Lukovit

Lukovit (Bulgarian: Луковит [ˈɫukovit]) is a town in northern Bulgaria, part of Lovech Province. It is situated on both banks of the Zlatna Panega between the Danubian Plain and the foot of Stara Planina. As of December 2009, the town had a population of 9,630.

The town was first mentioned in Ottoman registers of 1430. In 1495, it had 47 households. Between 1683 and 1687, Lukovit was part of an Ottoman process of forceful Islamization, but was never completely converted as late as 1860 when it had 250 Muslim Bulgarian and 260 Eastern Orthodox households. After the Liberation of Bulgaria, all the Muslims left the town.

Buried artefacts from the 4th century BC Thracian culture, the Lukovit Treasure (Bulgarian: Луковитско съкровище) comprising horse brasses made of silver, were found in 1953 near the town.

== Honour ==
Lukovit Point on Livingston Island, South Shetland Islands is named after Lukovit. The local football team is Botev Lukovit.

== See also ==
- Aglen
- Lovech
- Petrevene
- Teteven
