= Orlovo Oko (Eagles eye) =

Sightseeing platform in Bulgaria

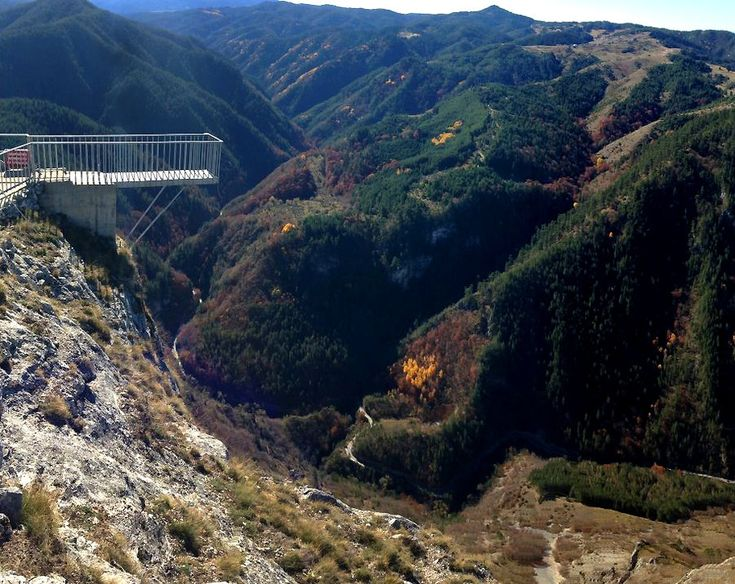
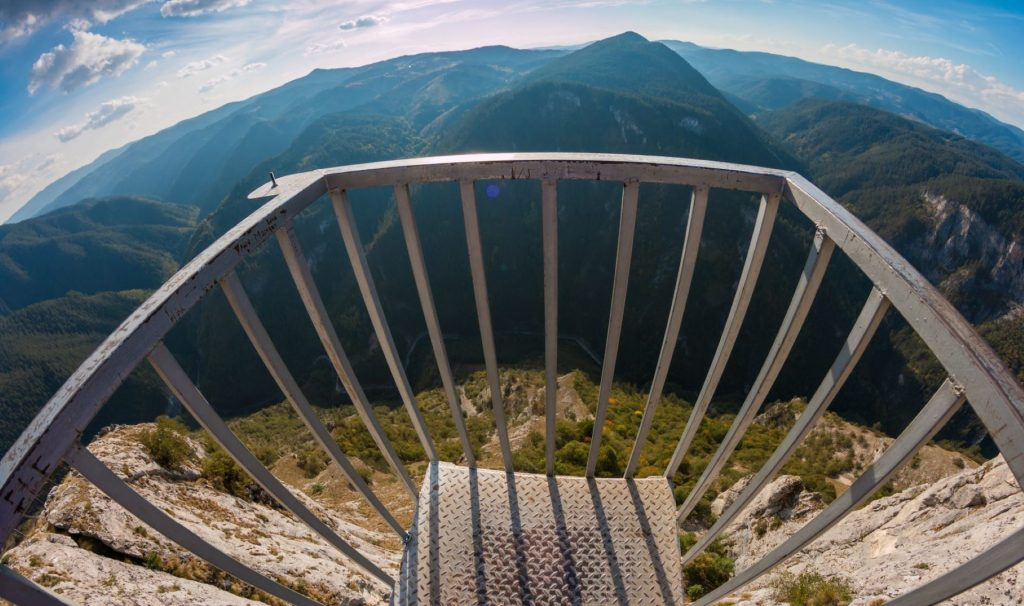
Orlovo Oko (Eagles Eye)

- Location within Bulgaria
- Elevation: 1,661 metres (5,449 ft)
- Traversed by: E79

Third Approach
- Location: Smolyan Province, Bulgaria
- Range: Pirin Mountains, Rila-Rhodope Massif
- Coordinates: 41°39.0′N 23°22.2′E

For information relating to Geography, Geology, Climate, Hydrology, Nature, and Tourism in the area, see Pirin Mountains

Orlovo Oko (Eagle's Eye) (Орлово Око in Bulgarian)is a sightseeing platform situated 1,563 meters (5,125 ft) above sea level, next to St. Ilia Peak in the Rhodope Mountains. It is located near the village of Yagodina and the Yagodinska Cave.

== Description ==
The platform is a steel structure that extends 670 meters (2,198 ft) above Buynovsko Gorge. Access is available by foot, four-wheel-drive, or mountain bike, with the trail starting at the village of Yagodina heading towards Trigrad and following the mountain ridge.

The site offers views of the gorge, nearby villages, and distant Bulgarian and Greek peaks. Local wildlife includes golden eagles and wild goats. Orlovo Oko is approximately a 2.5-hour drive southwest of Plovdiv and an additional hour from Sofia. It can be visited along with nearby attractions such as Trigrad Gorge, the Devil's Throat, Yagodinska Cave, and the villages of Yagodina and Trigrad.

The total cost of the project for the platform was 21,000 BGN (US$11,760), collected from the entrance fees to the Yagodinska Cave. The platform is designed to support a load of up to 3 tons.
