= Chala, Bulgaria =

Chala Чала
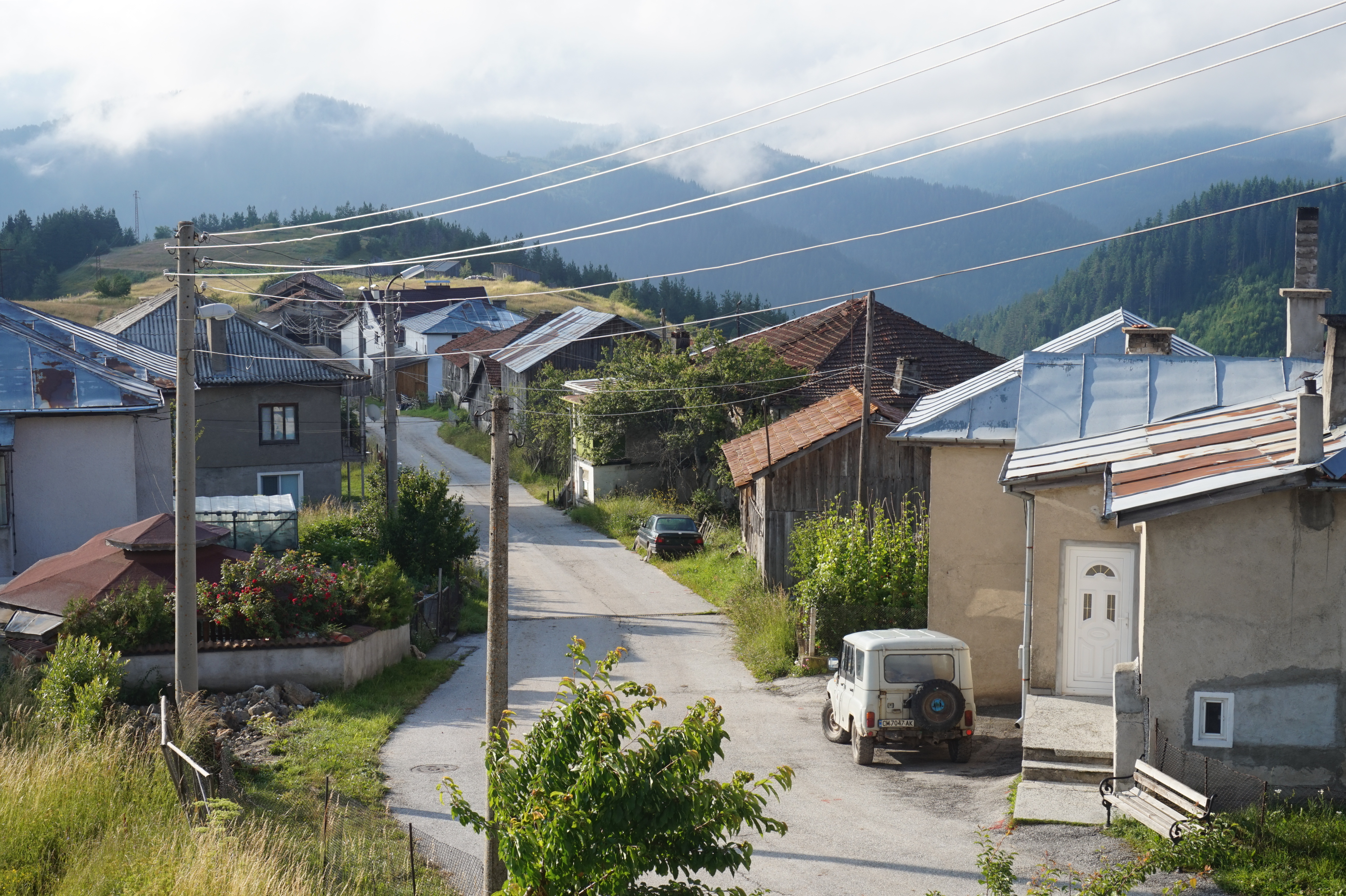

- Location of Chala, Bulgaria
- Coordinates: 41°37′49.79″N 24°18′3.99″E
- Country: Bulgaria
- Provinces (Oblast): Smolyan Province

Government
  - Mayor: Mustafa Karaamed
- Elevation: 1,428 m (4,685 ft)

Population (15.09.2022)
  - Total: 108
- Time zone: UTC+2 (EET)
  - Summer (DST): UTC+3 (EEST)
- Postal Code: 4836
- Area codes: 03042 from Bulgaria, 003593042 from outside

Chala (Bulgarian: Чала) is a village in southern Bulgaria. It has a population of 108 as of 2022.

== Geography ==
Chala is located in the southwestern part of Smolyan Province and has a territory of 12.185 km^{2}. It is part of Borino Municipality. The closest settlements are the villages of Borino to the north, Yagodina to the east, Buynovo to the south and Zmeitsa to the west. The village is situated in the western part of the Rhodope Mountains in the valley of the river Vacha. Landmarks in its vicinity include Yagodinska Cave and Buynovo Gorge.
