= Yagodina, Bulgaria =

Yagodina Ягодина
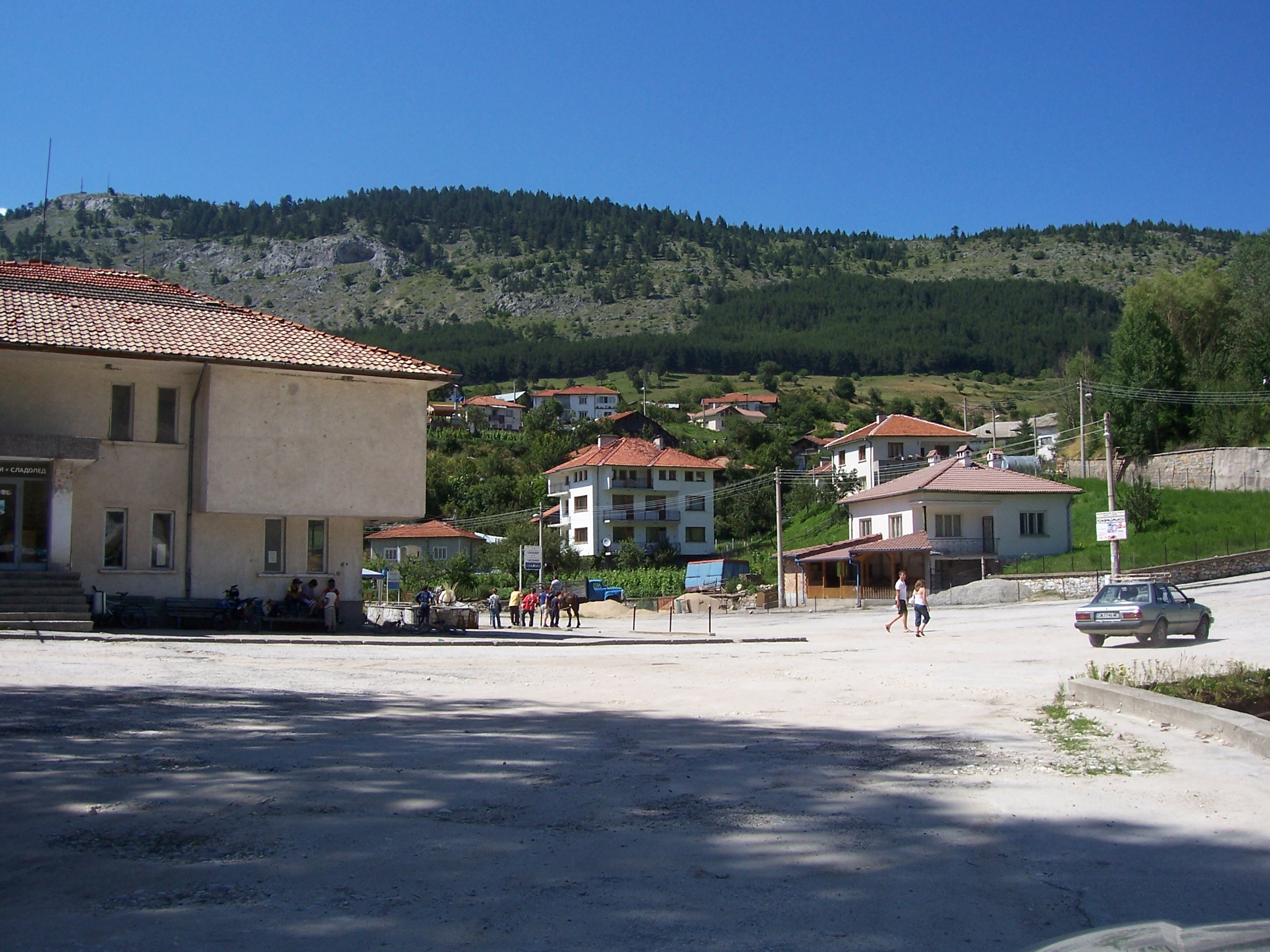

- Location of Yagodina, Bulgaria
- Coordinates: 41°38′8.18″N 24°20′56.84″E
- Country: Bulgaria
- Provinces (Oblast): Smolyan Province

Government
  - Mayor: Mitko Sakalev
- Elevation: 1,117 m (3,665 ft)

Population (15.09.2022)
  - Total: 379
- Time zone: UTC+2 (EET)
  - Summer (DST): UTC+3 (EEST)
- Postal Code: 4835
- Area codes: 030419 from Bulgaria, 0035930419 from outside

Yagodina (Bulgarian: Ягодина) is a village in southern Bulgaria. It has a population of 379 as of 2022.

== Geography ==
Yagodina is located in the southwestern part of Smolyan Province and has a territory of 30,838 km^{2}. It is part of Borino Municipality and situated close to the border with Greece. It lies 24 km south of the towns of Devin. The closest settlements are the villages of Teshel and Gyovren to the north, Trigrad to the southeast and Chala to the west.

Yagodina is situated in the western part of the Rhodope Mountains in the valley of the river Vacha. Two of the Rhodope's most famous gorges are partially within the territory of the villages, the Buynovo and the Trigrad Gorges. The forested summit of Durdaga (1,693 m) lies 700 m of Yagodina. The most renown landmark of the village is Yagodinska Cave, the longest in the Rhodope Mountains and one of the longest in Bulgaria. There are numerous tourist trails in its vicinity, leading to other caves, such as the Devil's, the Orlovo Oko panoramic platform, waterfalls and summits. Many of the surrounding landmarks are included in the 100 Tourist Sites of Bulgaria.

== Economy ==
The main drivers of the local economy and tourism and agriculture. Crops include potatoes, oats and raspberries. Livestock breeding is also developed, mainly sheep and cattle. There is a carpet workshop.
