= Buynovo =

Buynovo is a Bulgarian toponym that may refer to the following places:

- Buynovo, Smolyan Province, village in Borino Municipality
- Buynovo, Targovishte Province, village in Targovishte Municipality
