= Borino =

Borino Ягодина
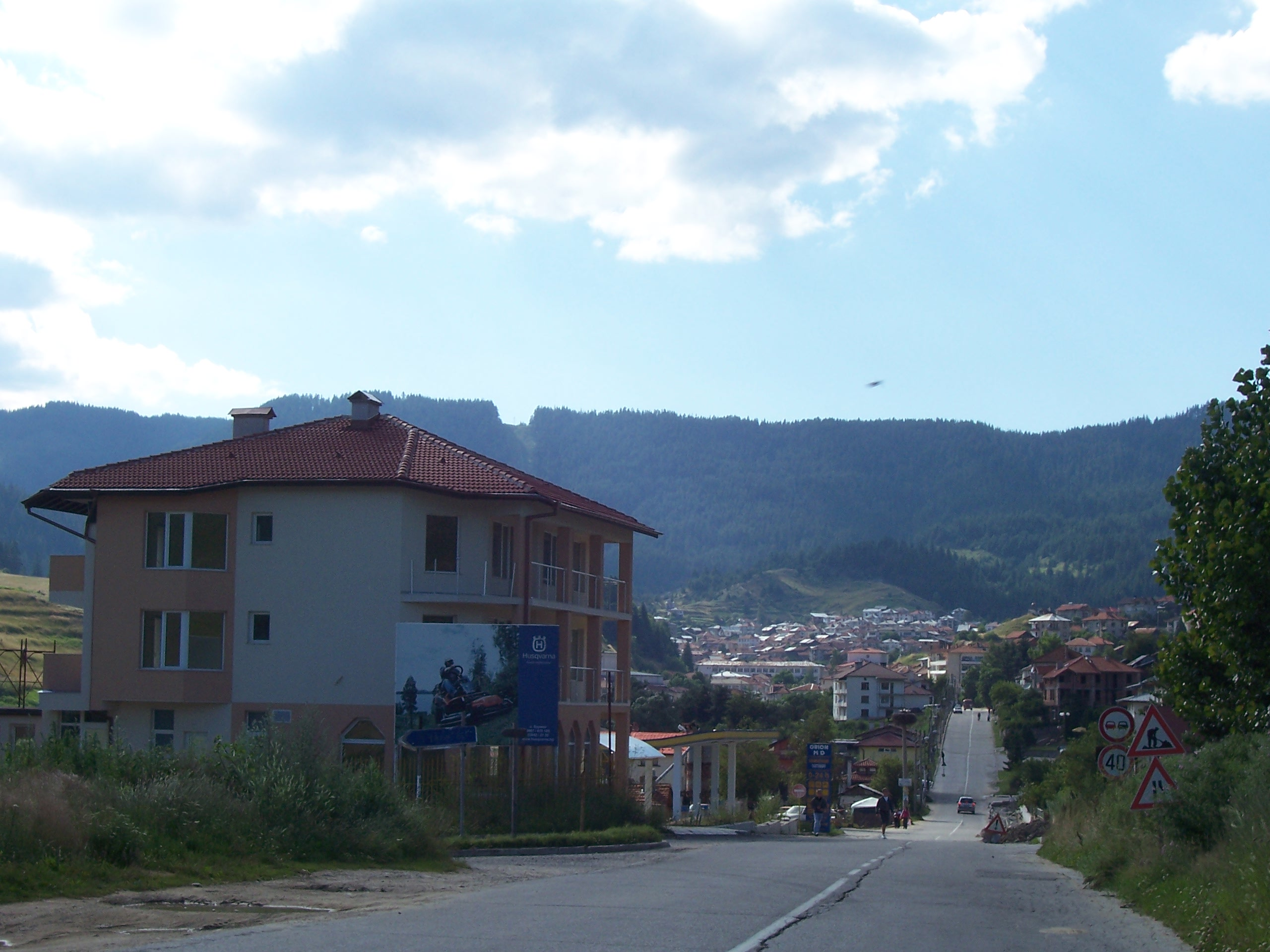

- Location of Borino, Bulgaria
- Coordinates: 41°41′0.94″N 24°17′33.71″E
- Country: Bulgaria
- Provinces (Oblast): Smolyan Province

Government
  - Mayor: Mustafa Karaahmed
- Elevation: 1,146 m (3,760 ft)

Population (15.09.2022)
  - Total: 2,338
- Time zone: UTC+2 (EET)
  - Summer (DST): UTC+3 (EEST)
- Postal Code: 4824
- Area codes: 03042 from Bulgaria, 003593042 from outside

Borino (Bulgarian: Борино is a village of Smolyan Province in southern Bulgaria. It is the administrative centre of Borino Municipality.

Borino is situated in a valley in the Western Rhodope Mountains, at an altitude of 1,140 metres (3,740 ft). It is a multi-ethnic village with communities of Turks, Bulgarians, Muslim Bulgarians, and Roma. As a municipal center, Borino includes the villages of Yagodina, Chala, Kozhari, and Buinovo.

Nearby places of interest include Yagodinska Cave, Devil's Throat Cave, Trigrad Gorge, and Buynovo Gorge, the Devil's Bridge, The Old Roman Bridge – Kemera, Videnitsa Peak, and the Kastrakli Nature Reserve.

== History ==
=== Ancient history ===
The Rhodopes are considered one of the cradles of European civilization. It is estimated that primitive people settled the region around 65,000 to 60,000 BC. The oldest evidence of human presence in the Rhodopes, flint instruments, was discovered in Borino by an archeological excavation near the current Orpheus Chalet. During fall and winter, eneolithic people lived in the caves of the region. Experts have discovered hearths from this time period dating from 4000 to 3000 BC in Yagodina Cave and idyllic figures connected with the cult to the Woman-Mother and the Sun Cult in Haramiska Cave near the Devil's Throat Cave.

Two-thousand years ago in the surrounding areas of Borino lived the Thracian tribe of Bessi. From these tribes have been discovered Thracian burial mounds on the Turlata Peak, located near Borino, and many shrines scattered throughout the area. The Shrine of Dionysius in the Rhodopes and the musical culture of the Thracians are connected with the name of the mythological Rhodope singer Orpheus, who fascinated the wind and wild beasts with the sounds of his lyre. He is the creator of the philosophical study Orphism. There exists a hypothesis, that on the Videnitsa Peak was located the famous Shrine of Dionysius – visited by Gaius Octavius and by Alexander the Great.

As the Thracian civilization started to fade Roman rule entered the Rhodopes. Near Borino pieces of roads and the bridge Kemera can still be seen from this time. Near Borino ran the direct road from Philipopolis (Plovdiv) to Nicopolis ad Nestum (Gotse Delchev) and Macedonia.

=== Creation of Bulgaria ===
During the 6th century the Slavs began to settle the Balkan Peninsula. Following the Slavs, Proto-Bulgarians arrived in the 7th century. These two new tribes, together with the Thracians created the state of Bulgaria in 681 AD. From the Proto-Bulgarians they took the name for the new state, from the Slavs they took the language – Slavic, and from the Thracians their cultural heritage and traditions. At that time each of the three tribes avowed to a different religion. To unify the people of Bulgaria Christianity was declared the state religion in 865 AD and Bulgaria was baptized as a Christian state. However, in the Rhodopes, Christianity has been spreading three centuries before the baptizing of Bulgaria. It is well known that the Bible was translated into the language of the Thracians – the Bible Besika.

=== Karabulak-Borino ===
In 1396 AD the Rhodopes, like all of Bulgaria, fell under the Turkish rule. From this period, in the Jumaya Duzu region near Borino, there is a medieval necropolis (graveyard) where the first graves are Christian and later graves are Muslim. Most of Bulgaria was freed from the Ottoman Empire in 1878, however according to the Bulgarian-Turkish agreement of 1886 Borino remained in the Turkish Empire. After the Balkan Wars, in 1912 Borino was finally returned to Bulgaria according to the Treaty of Bucharest (1913).

Until 1934, Borino carried the name Karabulak (kara bulak – translated from Turkish which means the "black fountain"). She arrived in the territory of Borino together with her four sons from the nearby village of Gyovren. Here the brothers started their families in four different places in the valley, thereby creating the four neighborhoods of the village. Unfortunately for the time period before 1934 there are no preserved written records for the naming, development, and history of the village. A large part of this information has been verbally passed down through the generations and preserved in local folklore and culture.

=== Modern history ===
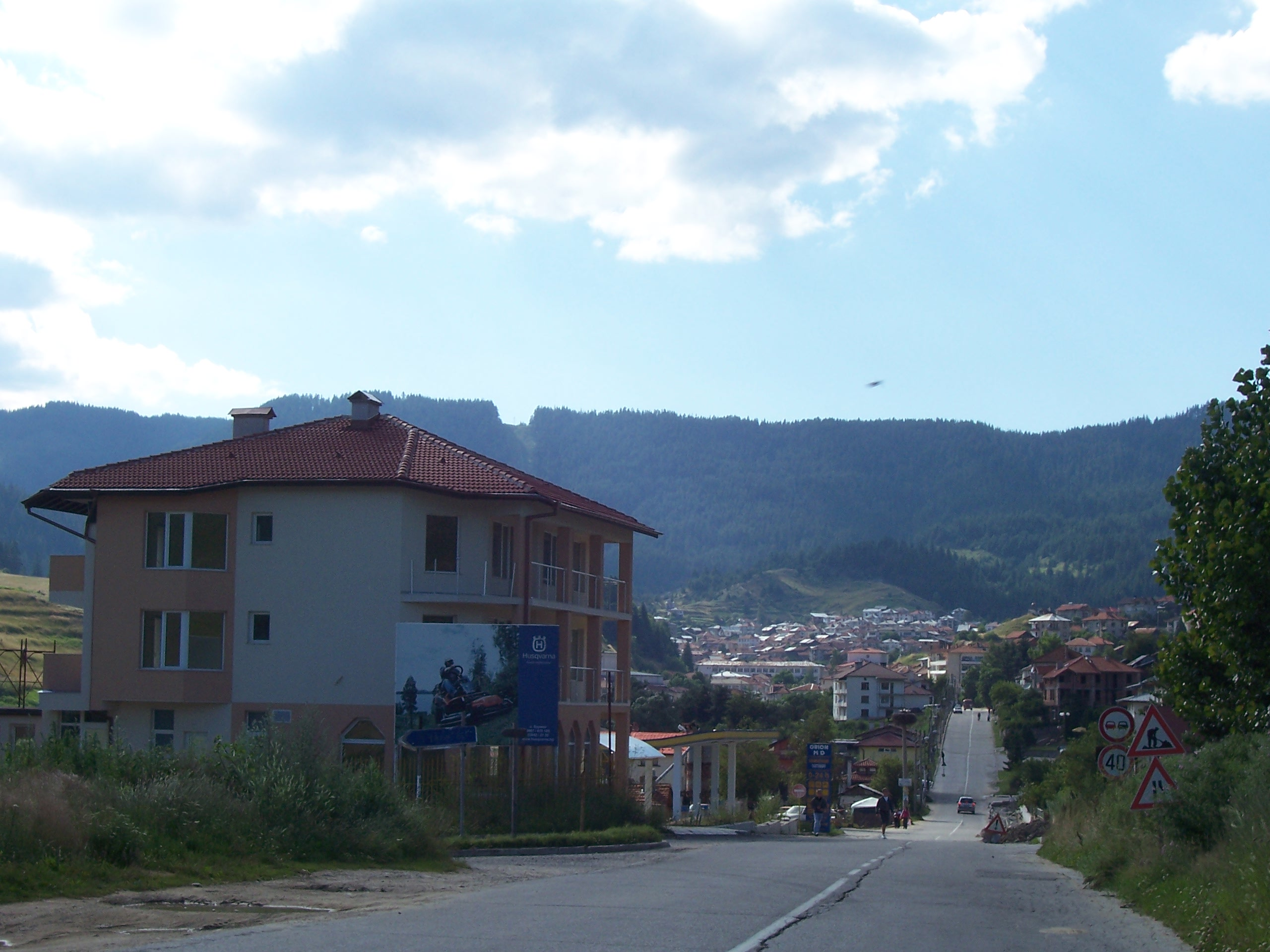
The village of Borino

In Borino until 1930 the population was exclusively Turkish. After 1930 Bulgarians began to settle in Borino from villages near Smolyan – Sokolovtsi, Gela, Solishta, Stoikite, and others. They bought land from local Turkish families who were emigrating to Turkey. Here they found better conditions for sheep raising and were nearer to their lands on the Aegean Sea (The White Sea, or Бяло море, in Bulgarian) in present-day Greece.

After 1945 the village continued to develop with the major priority being infrastructure and social-health structures – school, lyceum, and a new road to the village. In 1960 the village was supplied with electricity.

A controversial event in the most recent history of Borino is, as it was called by the government, the “Regeneration Process,” which began in December 1975 and continued until the beginning of 1990. This process is associated with the forcing of the Turkish and Bulgarian-Muslim minority in Bulgaria to change their names (both first names and family names) to Bulgarian names.

== Natural environment ==
In the territory of Borino there are nearly 2,000 recorded plants species. Many of these are of great ecological importance. Of these, 69 are protected species in Bulgaria and 11 are included in the European list of rare and threatened endemic plants. Some of the more interesting are:

- Alpine Clematis (Clematis Alpina) – a herbaceous (grassy) perennial with climbing stems, which grows around bushes and coniferous trees. This flower is protected in Bulgaria.
- Silivriak (Haberlea rhodopensis) – a perennial flower with dark green leaves and a violet flower which grows limestone rock. Silivriak is a Balkan relict endemic, left over from ancient flora, which withstood the Ice Ages. It can only be found in the Rhodope Mountains and is known as the symbol of the Rhodopes. According to legend, it sprouted from the blood of Orpheus. Silivriak has the unique ability to come back to life if it is put in water even after it has been pressed for years.
- Rhodopsko Omayniche (Geum rhodopaeum) grows around damp mountain meadows, with bright orangish red blossoms. It is a Bulgarian regional endemic.
- Rhodopsko Lale (Tulipa rhodopea) is found in limey/chalky rocky soil, blooming with large bright red flowers. This flower grows nowhere else in the world except the Rhodopes.

In the old growth forests of the Borino Municipality there is an abundance of wild fruits which have thrived for centuries in the Rhodope Mountains – wild blueberries, wild strawberries, raspberries, and rose hips. Also the Borino Municipality is well known for its wild mushrooms – manatarka, maclovka, curnelka, and pachi krak.

The Borino area is also home to a wide variety of animals many of which are of national and European significance – brown bears, wolves, wild boars, deer, elk and wild goats. Birds include wood grouse, golden eagles, falcons, kingfishers, and the wallcreeper in the Trigrad Gorge.

The average elevation of the region is 1,200 meters, with brown forest soils. The forested land of the Borino Municipality is over 5,280 hectares (13,000 acres) which is predominantly spruce and pine forests. In the region of Kabata, there is one-of-a-kind natural hybrid tree which baffles specialists. The tree is a mix of a pine and spruce tree – the bark of a pine and the needles of a spruce.

In the territory of the Borino Municipality is located the nature reserve Kastrakli.

The reserve is 124 hectares and was created with the purpose to preserve the old growth black pine and natural landscape. The reserve is an extraordinarily beautiful landscape with impressive rock formations, old-growth forests of black pine, Scots pine, and fir, as well as beech, sycamore, hornbeam, and aspen. The average age of the trees is more than 200 years old. The average elevation of the reserve is 1,200 meters. The highest point is 1,291 meters and the lowest 911 meters. The terrain is extremely varied with parts being extremely steep and nearly inaccessible while other areas are gently sloping. The steep and long vertical cliffs are magnificent with their numerous edges and terraces. A wide variety of plant and animal life is located in the reserve. In the Kastrakli reserve there are twenty-five protected plant species, twelve endangered, and eleven categorized as rare.

As a whole the natural resources of the region have not been studied extensively. While over 2,000 plant species have been discovered there is most likely many more yet undiscovered, in particular – mushrooms, lichens, and mosses.
