= Buynovo, Smolyan Province =

Buynovo Буйново
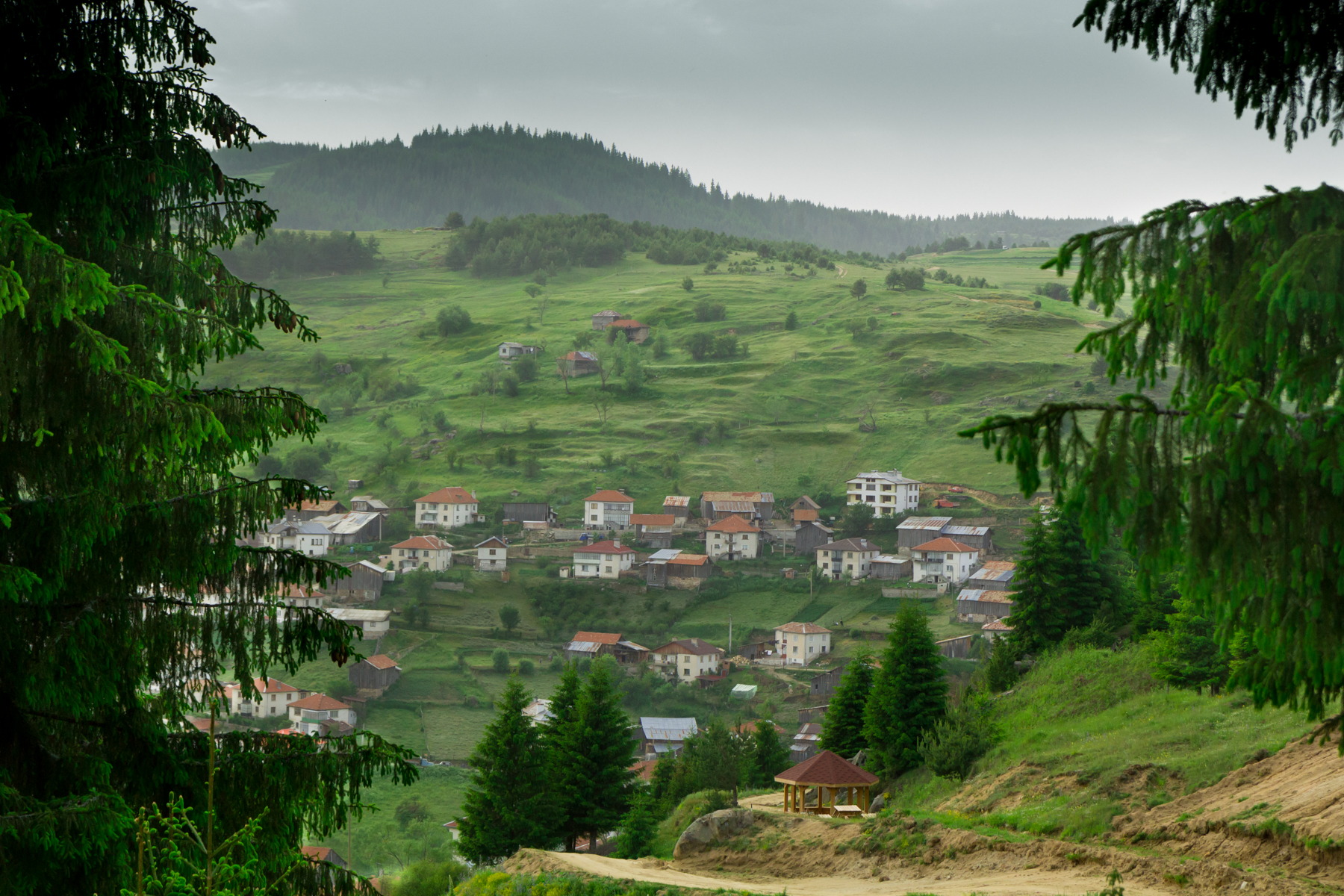

- Location of Buynovo, Bulgaria
- Coordinates: 41°33′40.37″N 24°18′55.61″E
- Country: Bulgaria
- Provinces (Oblast): Smolyan Province

Government
  - Mayor: Mitko Ivanov
- Elevation: 1,321 m (4,334 ft)

Population (15.09.2022)
  - Total: 230
- Time zone: UTC+2 (EET)
  - Summer (DST): UTC+3 (EEST)
- Postal Code: 4812
- Area codes: 030418 from Bulgaria, 0035930418 from outside

Buynovo (Bulgarian: Буйново) is a village in southern Bulgaria. It has a population of 230 as of 2022.

== Geography ==
Buynovo is located in the southwestern part of Smolyan Province and has a territory of 45.467 km^{2}. It is part of Borino Municipality and situated just north and east of the border with Greece. The closest settlement is the village of Kozhari to the southeast. Other nearby villages include Chala, Yagodina and Trigrad.

The village is situated in the western part of the Rhodope Mountains along the river Vacha. Upstream of the village in northern direction is Buynovo Gorge with dramatic steep cliffs. Along the gorge is located Yagodinska Cave, the longest in the Rhodope Mountains. Both the gorge and the cave are listed in the 100 Tourist Sites of Bulgaria.

== Gallery ==
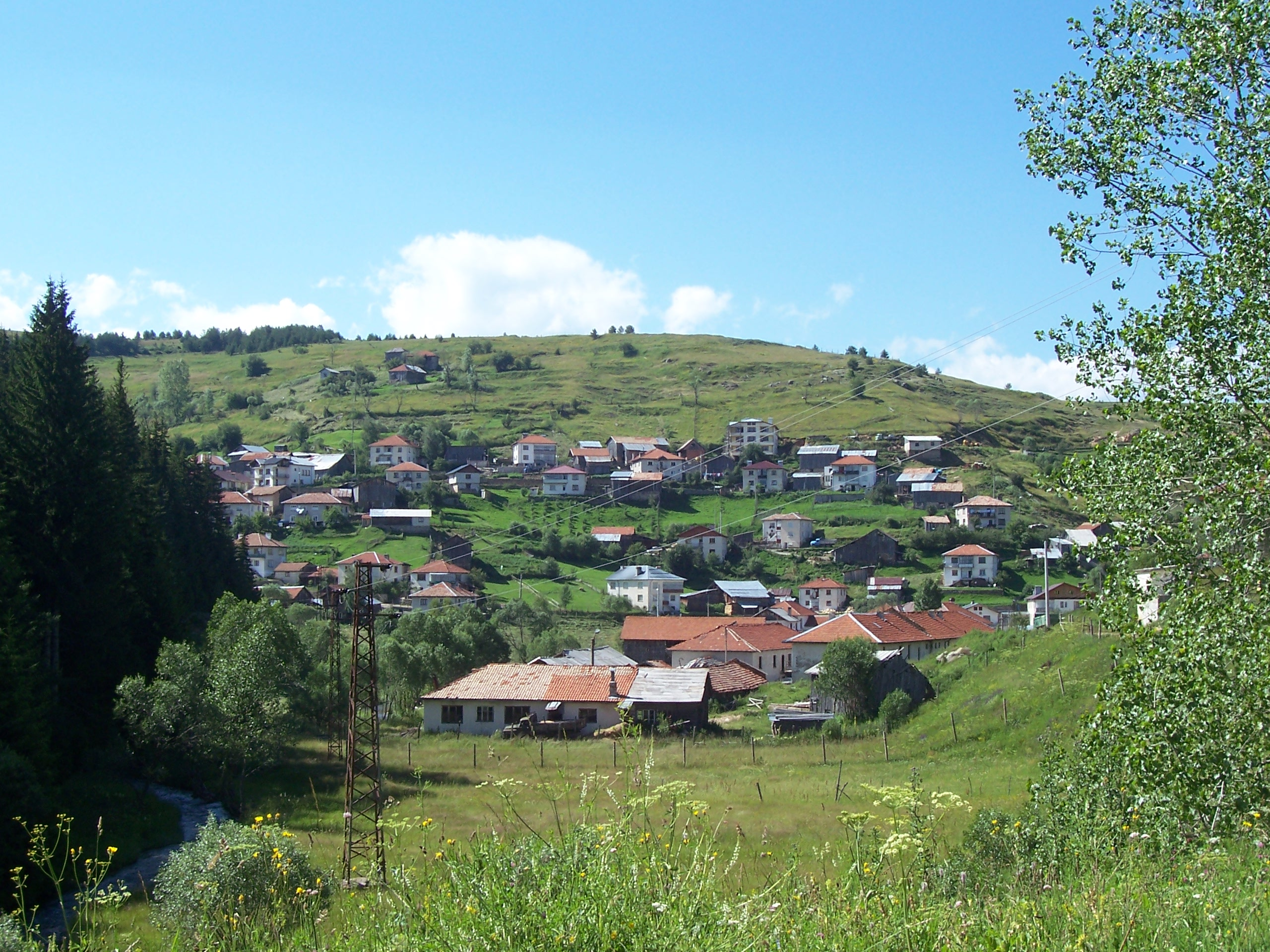

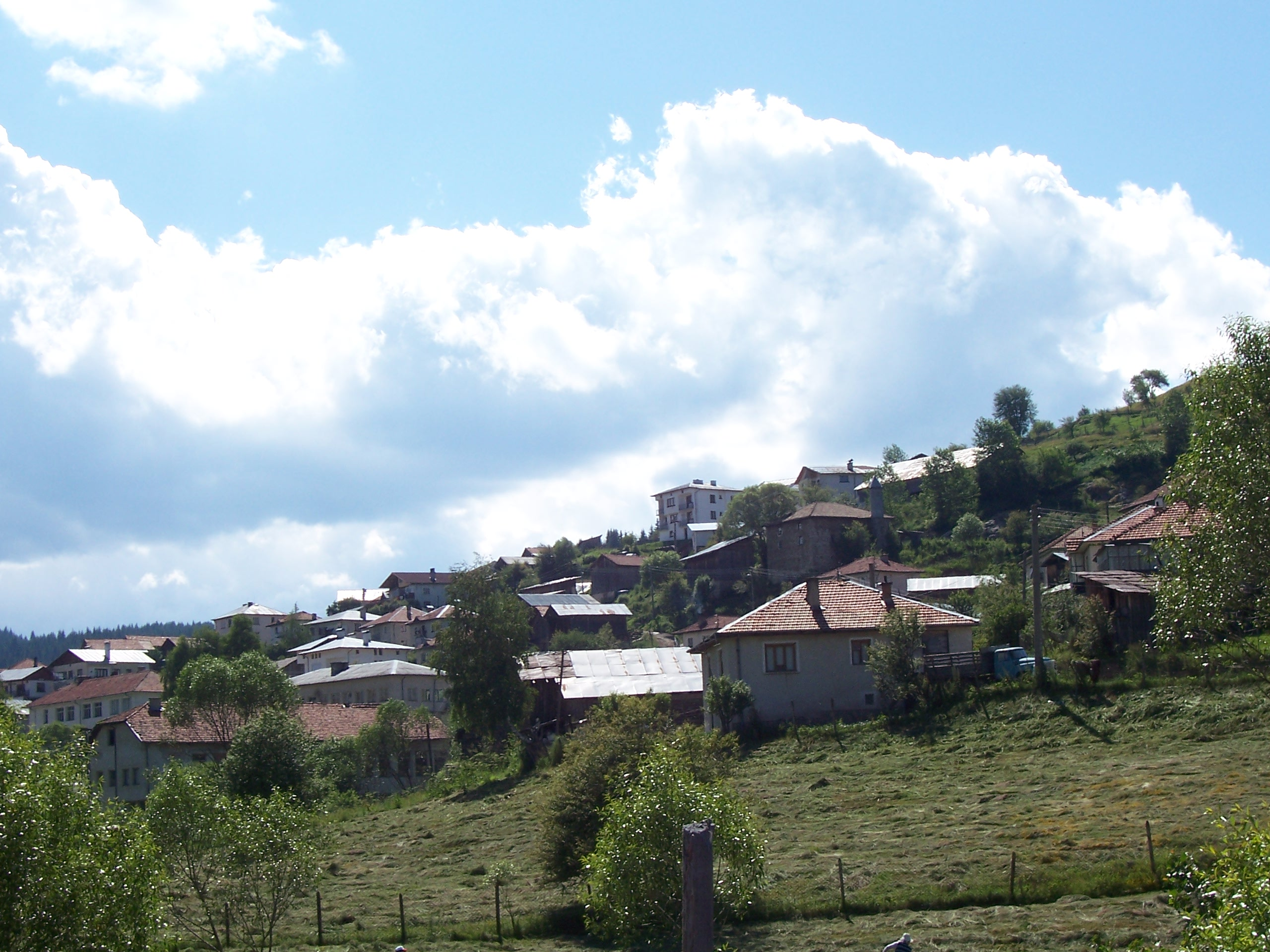

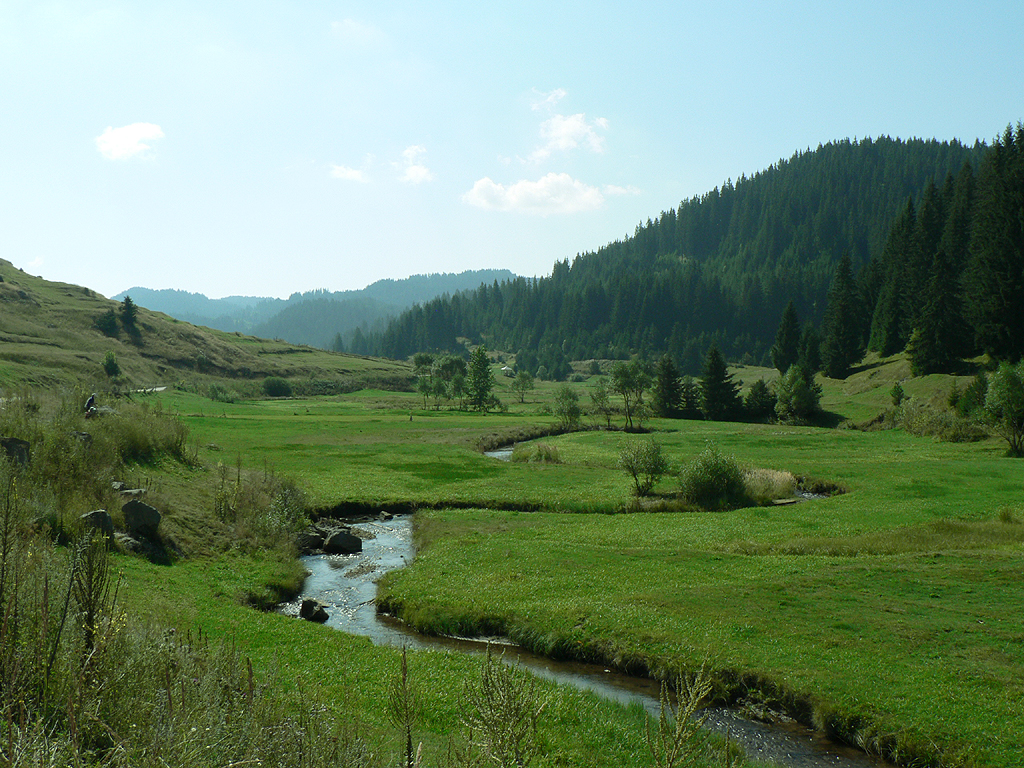
