= Kozhari =

Kozhari Кожари
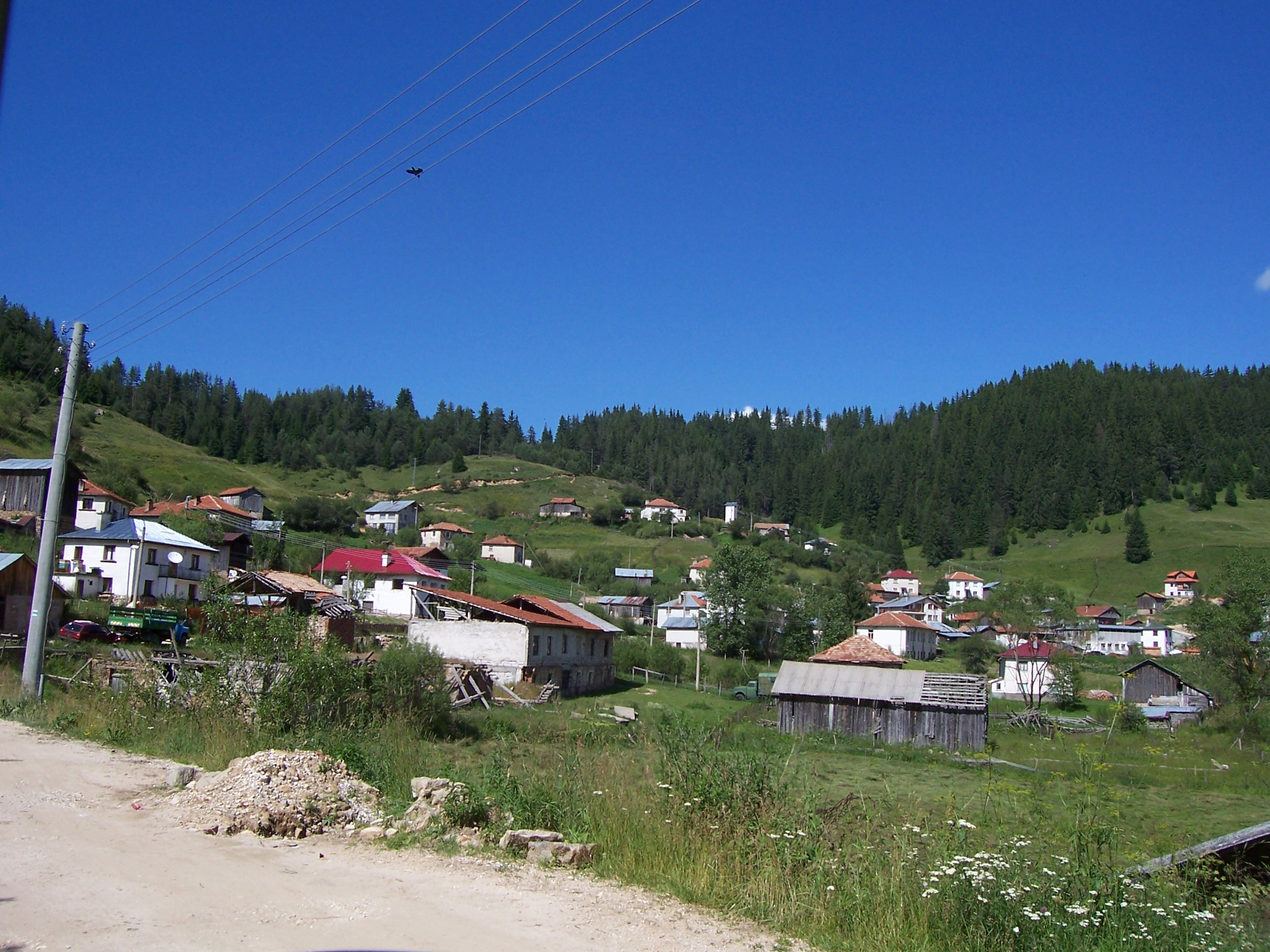

- Location of Kozhari, Bulgaria
- Coordinates: 41°32′34.53″N 24°20′8.64″E
- Country: Bulgaria
- Provinces (Oblast): Smolyan Province

Government
  - Mayor: Mustafa Karaamed
- Elevation: 1,356 m (4,449 ft)

Population (15.09.2022)
  - Total: 63
- Time zone: UTC+2 (EET)
  - Summer (DST): UTC+3 (EEST)
- Postal Code: 4813
- Area codes: 030418 from Bulgaria, 0035930417 from outside

Kozhari (Bulgarian: Кожари) is a village in southern Bulgaria. It has a population of 63 as of 2022.

== Geography ==
Kozhari is located in the southwestern part of Smolyan Province and has a territory of 10.147 km^{2}. It is part of Borino Municipality and situated just north of the border with Greece. The closest settlement is the village of Buynovo to the northwest. The village is situated in the western part of the Rhodope Mountains, about 2 km northwest of the source of the river Vacha and 13 km of the Yagodinska Cave.
