= Mihalkovo =

Mihalkovo Михалково
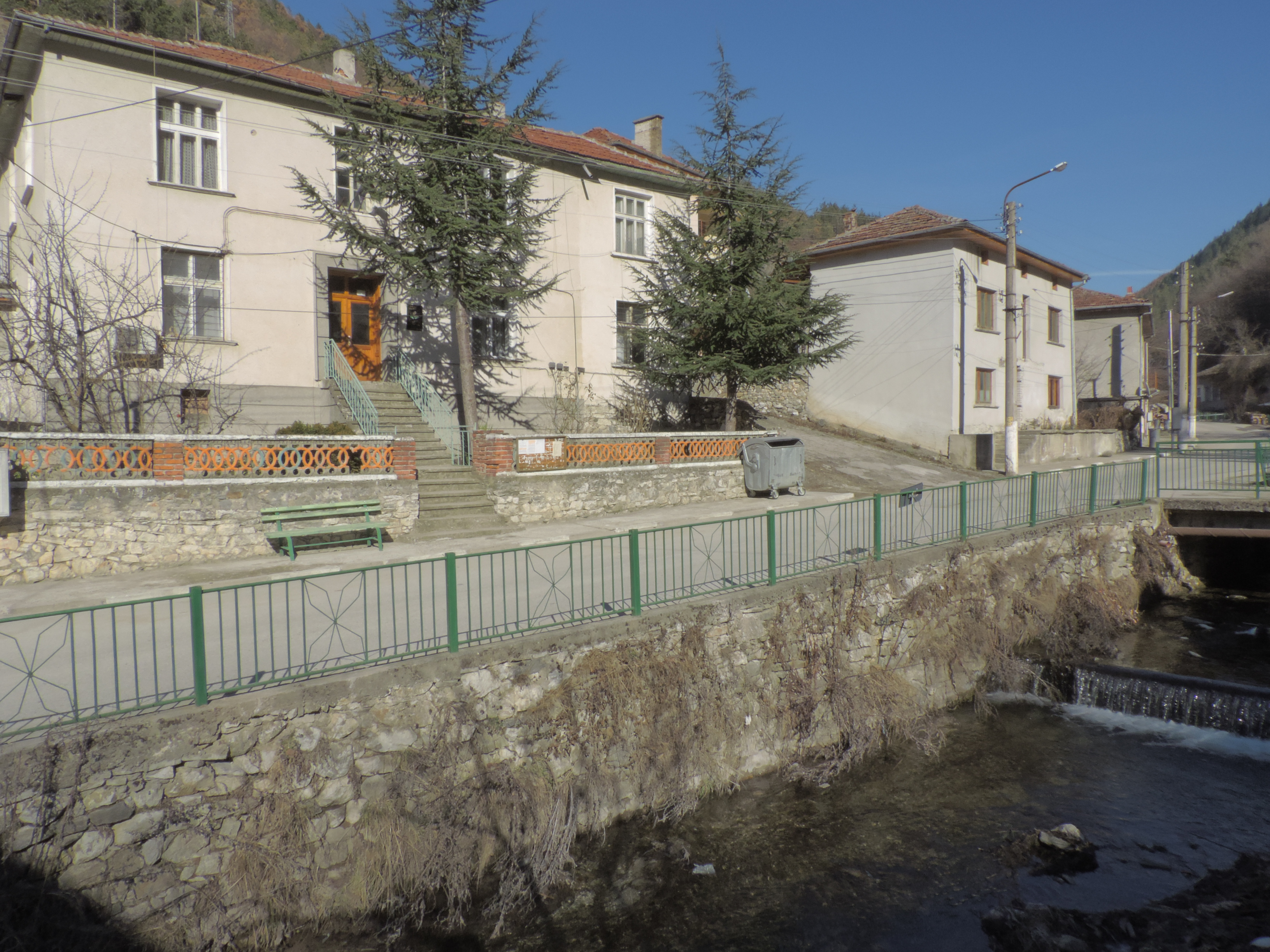

- Location of Mihalkovo, Bulgaria
- Coordinates: 41°50′47.18″N 24°25′24.96″E
- Country: Bulgaria
- Provinces (Oblast): Smolyan Province

Government
  - Mayor: Zdravko Ivanov
- Elevation: 717 m (2,352 ft)

Population (15.09.2022)
  - Total: 227
- Time zone: UTC+2 (EET)
  - Summer (DST): UTC+3 (EEST)
- Postal Code: 4820
- Area codes: 030472 from Bulgaria, 0035930472 from outside

Mihalkovo (Bulgarian: Михалково) is a village in southern Bulgaria. It has a population of 227 as of 2022. Mihalkovo is a spa resort.

== Geography ==
Mihalkovo is located in Smolyan Province and has a territory of 32.70 km^{2}. It is part of Devin Municipality and lies 21 km north of the municipal center Devin. The closest settlements are the villages of Selcha to the west, Stomanevo to the south and Churekovo to the east. Mihalkovo is served via the third class III-866 road Smolyan–Devin–Stamboliyski.

Mihalkovo is situated in the western part of the Rhodope Mountains on the river Vacha, between the reservoirs of Tsankov Kamak upstream to the south and Vacha downstream to the north, both part of the Dospat–Vacha Hydropower Cascade (500.2 MW).

Some 900 m east of the village is located the only naturally aerated water spring in Bulgaria, discovered in 1936. It has a temperature of 18–26 °C and output of 18 L/s. Its mineral composition is similar of those in the springs of Vichy in France and Kislovodsk in Russia. The water is used both for spa treatment and for bottling.

== Economy ==
The most important sectors are tourism and agriculture. The main crop are potatoes. There are fish farms in Vacha Reservoir and a bottling workshop.

== Gallery ==
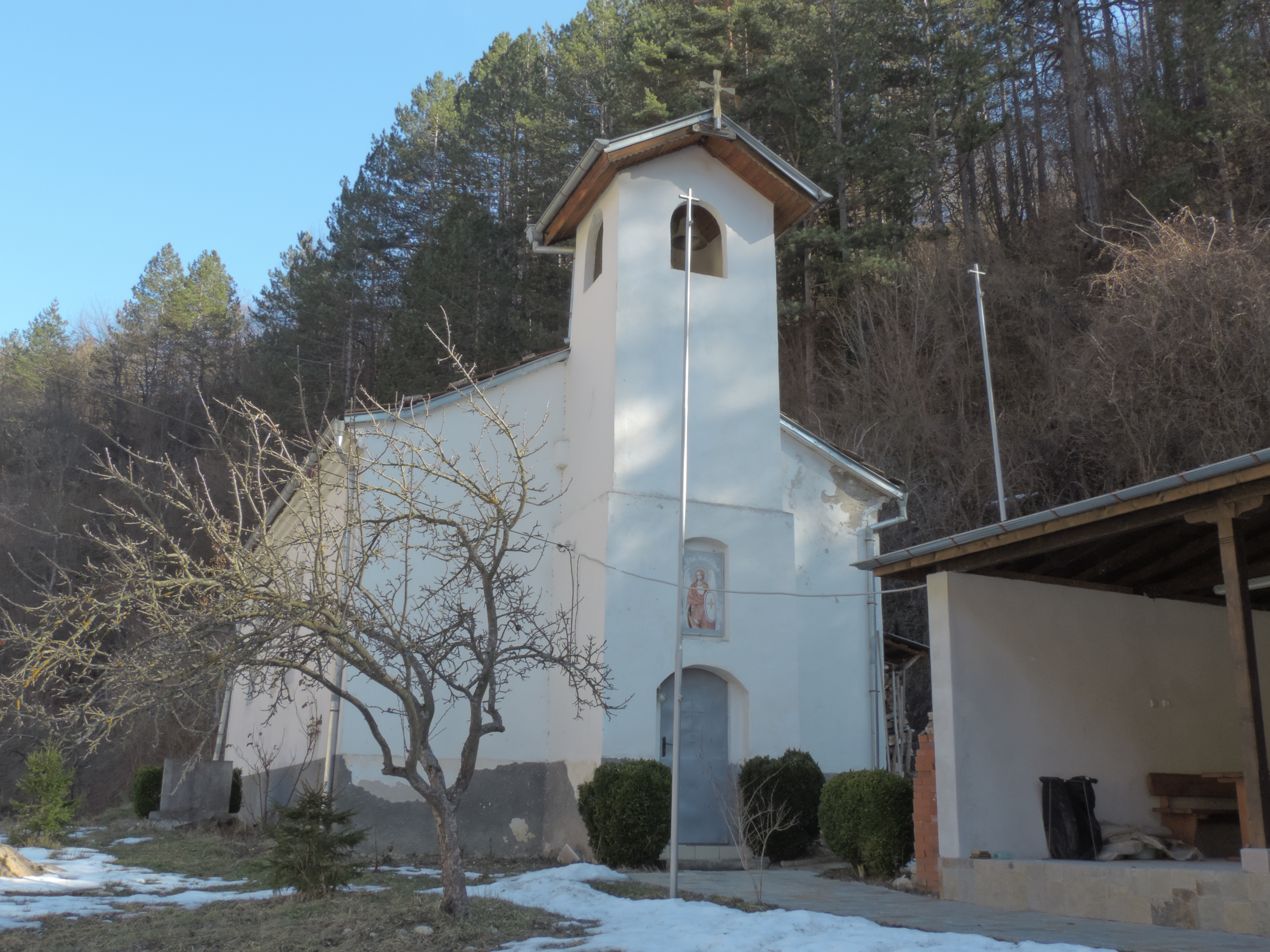
The Church of St Archangel Michael

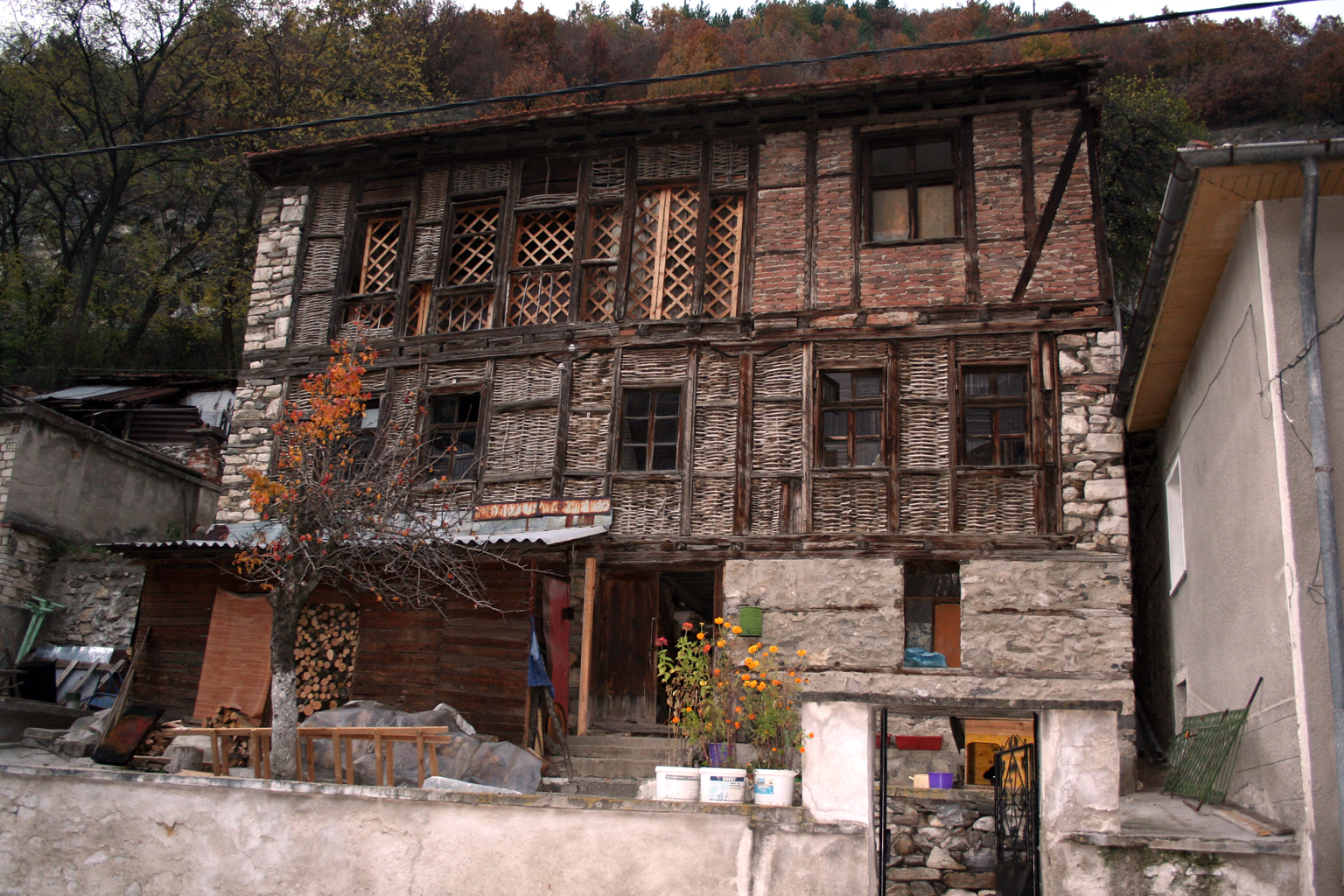
An old house

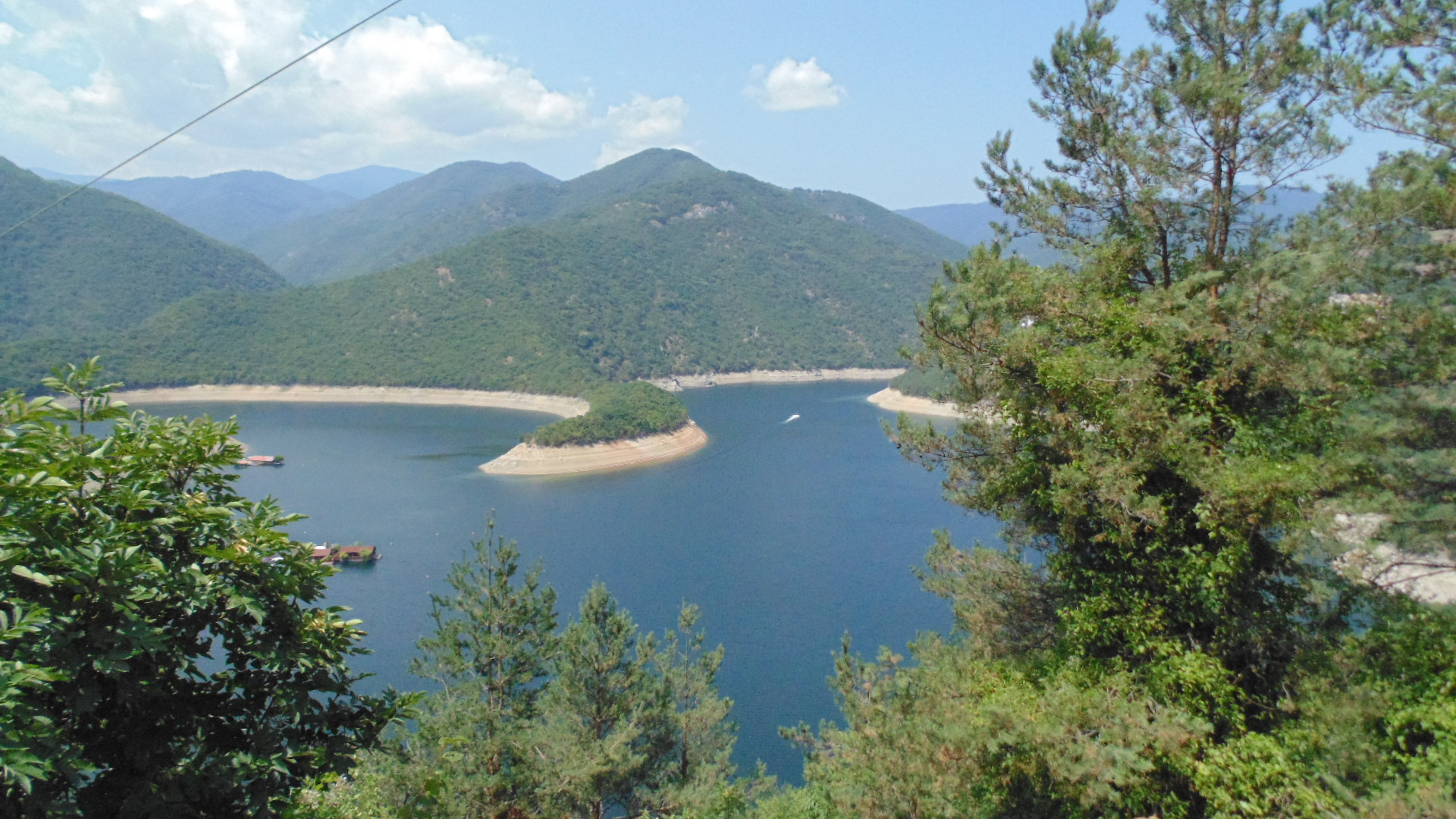
Vacha Reservoir
