= Buynovska =

Location
- Country: Bulgaria

Physical characteristics
- Mouth
  - location: Vacha
  - coordinates: 41.6719°N 24.3533°E

Basin features
- Progression: Vacha→ Maritsa→ Aegean Sea

The Buynovska (Bulgarian: Буйновска река) is a river of Plovdiv Province, Bulgaria. It is one of the source rivers of the Vacha and is joined by the Trigrad Gorge.
