= Devin, Bulgaria =

Town in Smolyan Province, Bulgaria

Devin
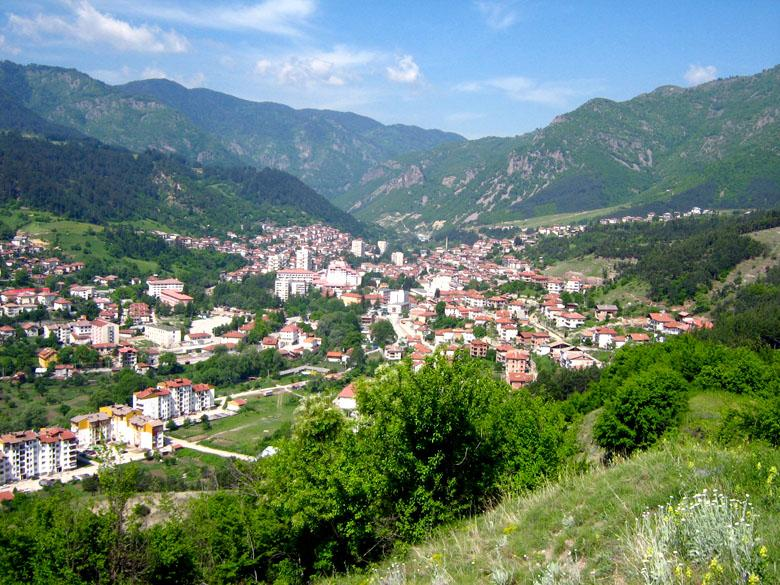
- Panoramic view over Devin

- Location of Devin, Bulgaria
- Coordinates: 41°44′N 24°24′E
- Country: Bulgaria
- Provinces (Oblast): Smolyan

Government
  - Mayor: Krasimir Daskalov
- Elevation: 715 m (2,346 ft)

Population (31.12.2009)
  - Total: 7,054
- Time zone: UTC+2 (EET)
  - Summer (DST): UTC+3 (EEST)
- Postal Code: 4800
- Area code: 03041

Devin (Bulgarian: Девин [ˈdɛvin]) is a spa town in Smolyan Province in the far south of Bulgaria. It is the administrative centre of the homonymous Devin Municipality. As of December 2009, the town had a population of 7,054.

== Location and geography ==
Devin is located in the valley of the Vacha River, 45 km from the city of Smolyan, at the confluence of the rivers Vacha and Devinska reka. Devin is also at a distance of 220 km from Sofia and 70 km from Plovdiv. The town itself is located in the vicinity of the popular ski resort of Pamporovo which is 35 km east of Devin.

The Devinska river runs through it and numerous other brooks and rivers (namely Krichim, Muglenska and Trigradska) are found nearby, all tributaries of the Vacha river. The altitude is uneven owing to the mountainous location, ranging from 684 m to around 800 m above sea level.

Devin's climate is described as having mild winters, cool summers with prolonged spells of sunny days. The air is pleasantly cool and crisp and humidity is normal. The mean annual temperature is 4 to 10 °C, depending on altitude. The lowest winter temperature is around -10 °C while the maximum summer temperature is in the region of 30 to 33 °C. Devin is protected from cold and violent westerly and north westerly winds due to the ridges that surround the town.

== Attractions ==
Devin is a popular tourist attraction. There is an abundance of hot springs and hence spa resorts in the area. The region was known in antiquity for the healing properties of its mineral springs. The waters have been claimed to treat and heal a variety of maladies: conditions of the skeletal, peripheral nervous, cardiovascular and pulmonary systems, skin disorders and others. In addition to these, the water is drunk or inhaled in the treatment of respiratory diseases, allergies and infections. The conditions available in Devin make it a centre for recovery and stabilising health.

A popular brand of mineral water being sold under the name Devin is bottled there.

The situation of Devin offers access to nearby gorges, rock formations, caves, forests, natural reserves with protected and endemic species, and most of all, clean air. Namely Trigrad gorge, the Devil's Throat Cave and Yagodinska cave. The Trigrad-Yagodina region has a karst scenery and has tens of other, albeit inhospitable, caves and rock formations. The protected region "Chairité" attracts visitors with an abundance of lakes, meadows and spruce and beech forests, one of which is called "the Drunken Forest" (Bulgarian: Пияната гора.) "Kastraklii", "Kazanite" and "Shabanitza" are natural reserves in the region around Devin with centuries-old pine and spruce forests and protected plant and animal communities.

== Economy ==
There is a great deal of hydroelectric construction in the area. Agriculture is highly developed. Dairy cattle rearing, fish farming, mushroom picking and cultivation, potato growing and others are of significance to the local economy.

== History ==
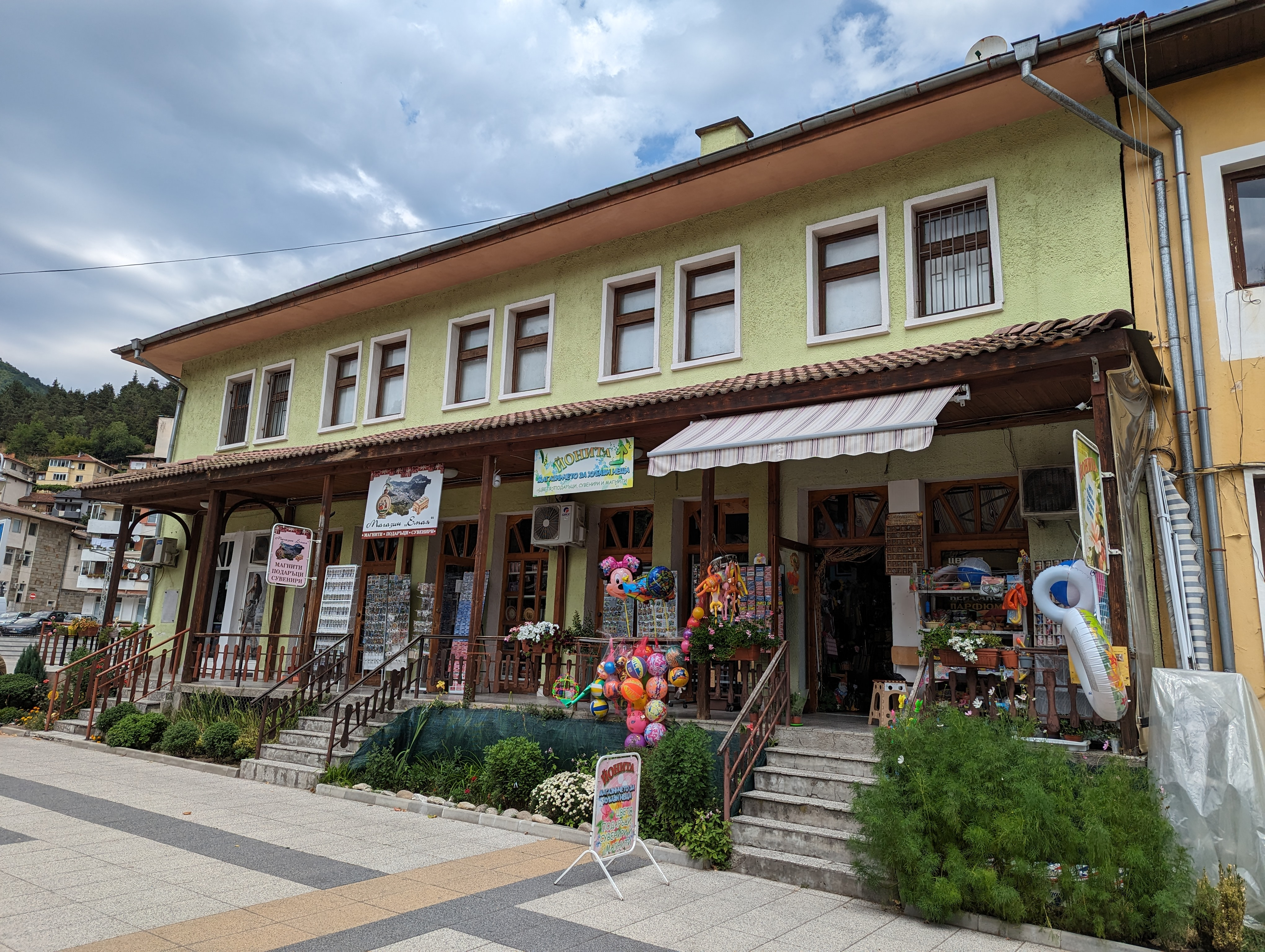
A building on the main street

Between 1878 and 1886, Devin formed a part of the short-lived and unrecognised Republic of Tamrash, an entity created by the local Pomaks who rejected the creation of Eastern Rumelia (to which it would have belonged). Although all within the Ottoman Empire, the regions were largely self-governing and Tamrash would maintain warm relations with the Ottoman authorities. Following the Bulgarian unification with Eastern Rumelia in 1885, Bulgaria occupied Tamrash with the intent of reintegrating the territories, but the Ottoman recognition of Bulgaria's new borders (de facto independent though nominally vassal of Ottoman Empire) meant that Devin - with the rest of the Tamrash region and most of Kardzhali region - would be handed over to the Ottoman Empire.

It was a kaza centre in the Sanjak of Drama in the Vilayet of Salonika before the Balkan Wars as "Ropçoz". In was liberated by the Bulgarian Army during the First Balkan War in 1912. The first Bulgarian school in Devin was founded in 1914 and the Rodopska Prosveta Community Centre (chitalishte) followed in 1923.

== Honour ==
Devin Saddle on Livingston Island in the South Shetland Islands, Antarctica is named after Devin.

== Notable natives ==
- Nikola Todev (actor)

== Sources ==
This article contains translations and data from:

- (in Bulgarian) Bulgarian Wikipedia.
