= Shirokolashka =

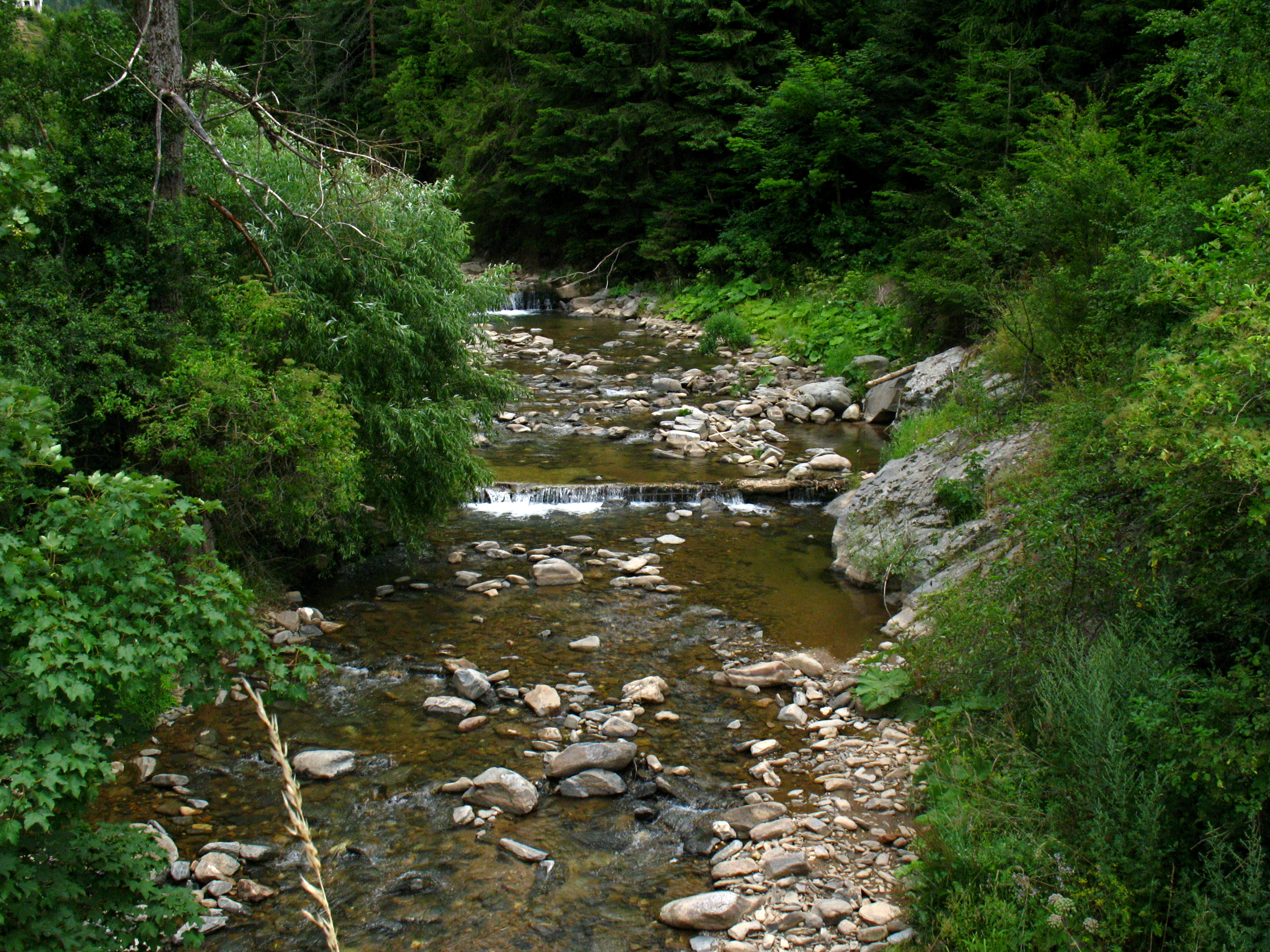

Location
- Country: Bulgaria

Physical characteristics
- Mouth
  - location: Vacha
  - coordinates: 41.7223°N 24.4230°E

Basin features
- Progression: Vacha→ Maritsa→ Aegean Sea

The Shirokolashka (Bulgarian: Широколъшка река) is a river of Plovdiv Province, Bulgaria. It is a tributary of the Vacha River. Along the river are villages such as Shiroka Laka with "typically Rodopean stone houses with small windows, high chimneys and hidden trapdoors."
