= Borino Municipality =

Coordinates: 41°41′0″N 24°17′0″E

Borino Municipality Община Борино
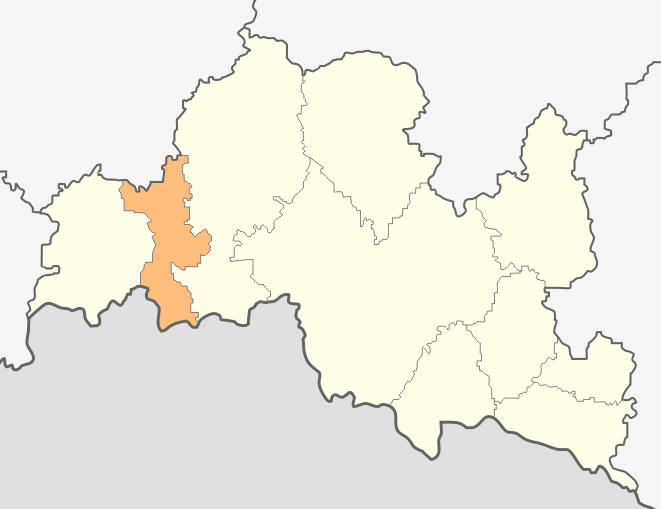
- Country: Bulgaria
- Province: Smolyan Province

Area
  - Total: 173.2 km^{2} (66.9 sq mi)

Population
  - Total: 3,118
  - Density: 18.00/km^{2} (46.63/sq mi)

Borino Municipality (Bulgarian: Община Борино) is a municipality in Smolyan Province, southern Bulgaria. Covering a territory of 173,2 km^{2}, it is the eighth largest of the ten municipalities in the province and takes 5.42% of its total area. It is among the few municipalities of Bulgaria that consists only of villages. It is entirely located in the western Rhodope Mountains.

== Demography ==
The population is 3,118 as of 2022. There are five villages — the capital Borino (pop. 2,338), as well as Buynovo (230), Chala (108), Kozhari (63) and Yagodina (379).

== Gallery ==
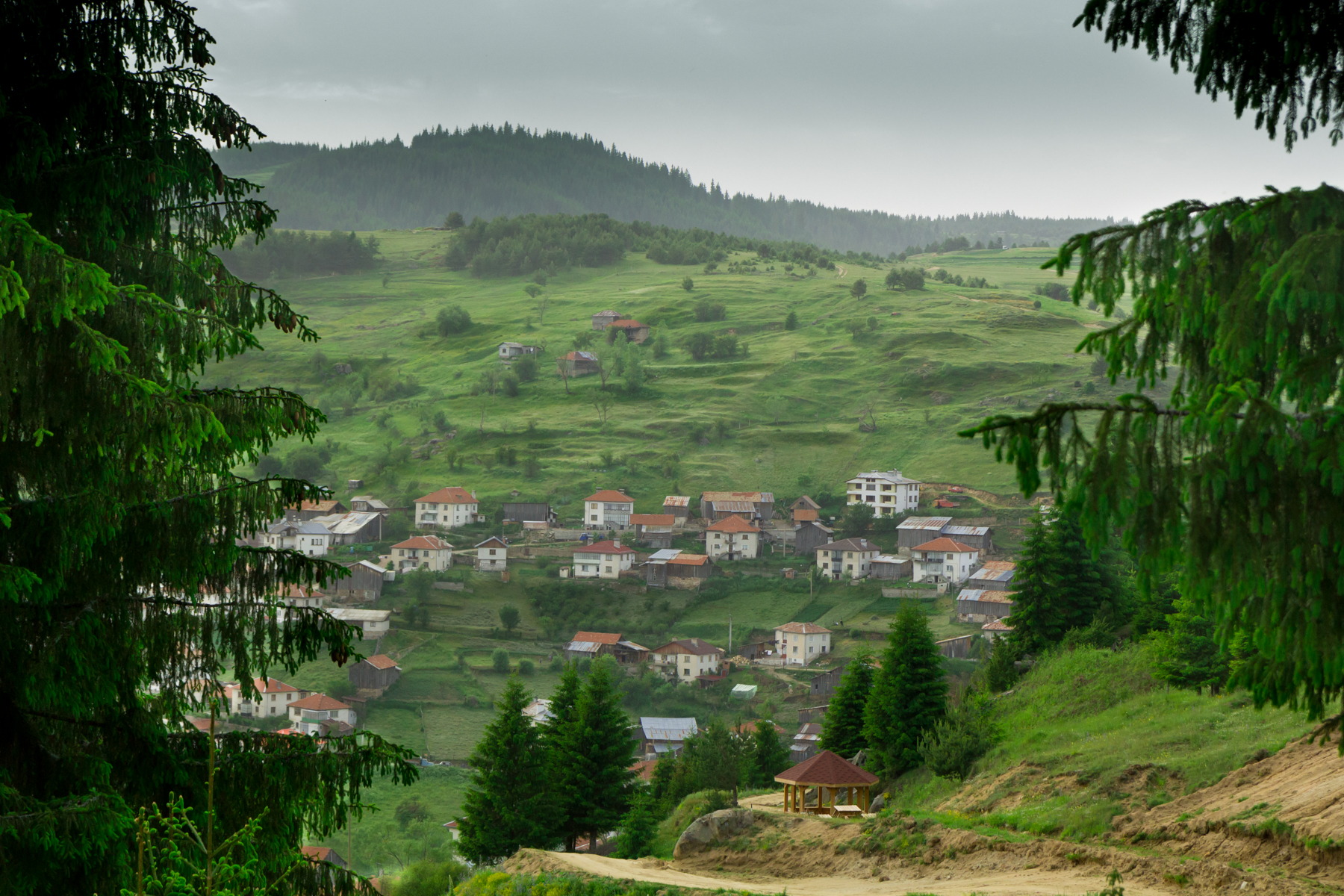
The village of Buynovo

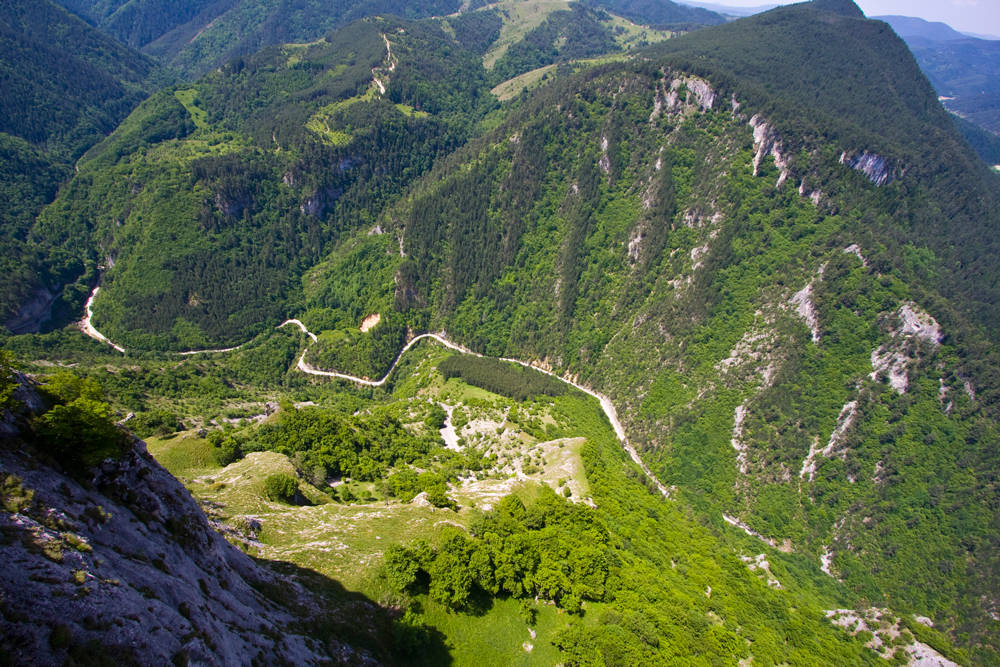
A view to Buynovo Gorge

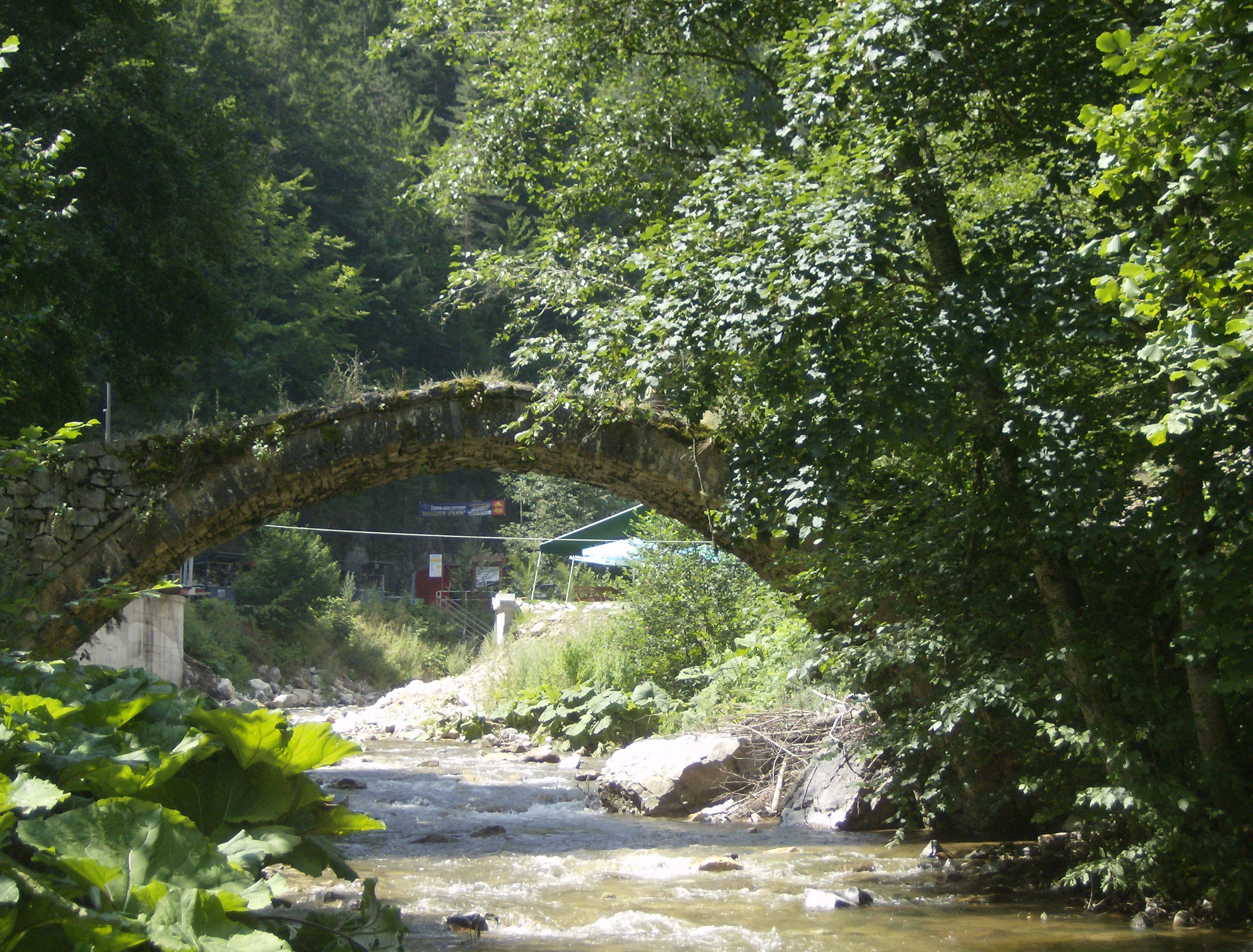
A bridge near Buynovo

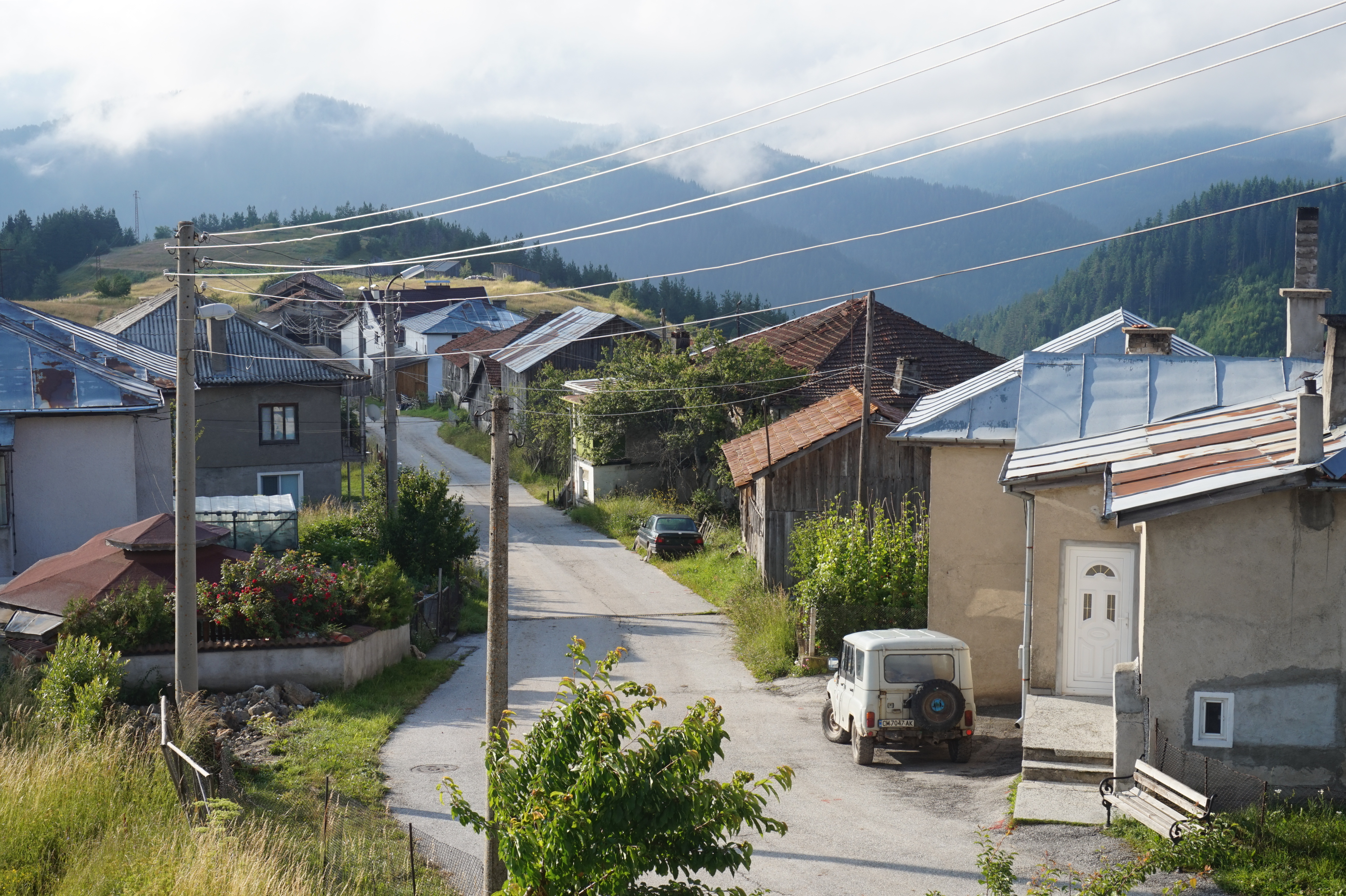
The village of Chala
