= Vacha (river) =

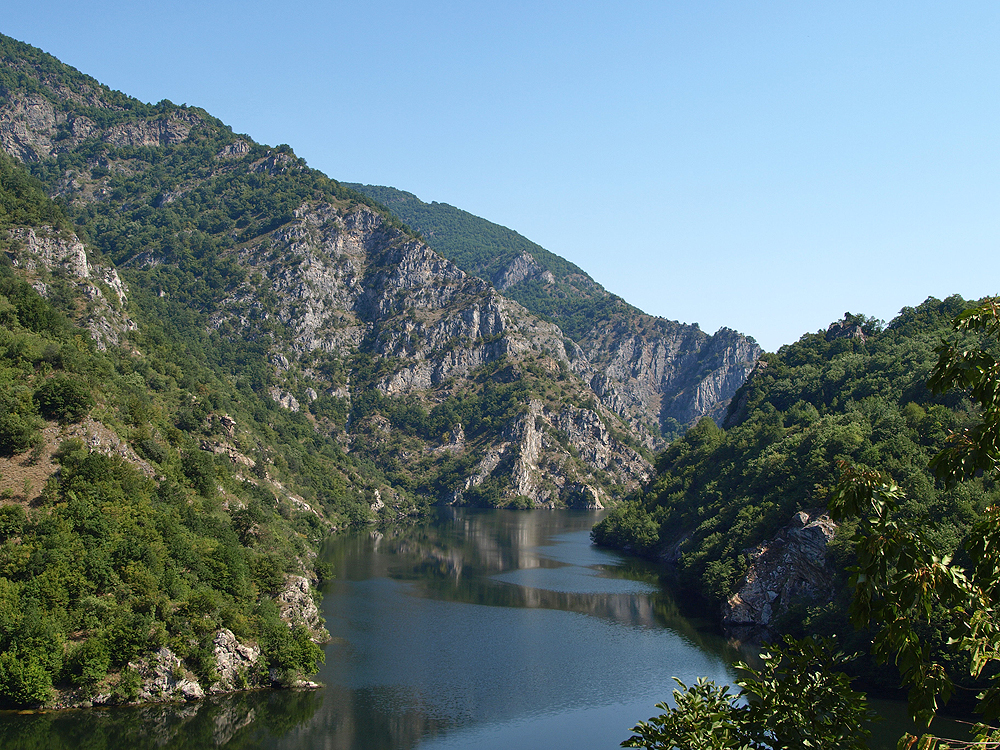

Location
- Country: Bulgaria

Physical characteristics
- Source
  - location: southeast of Kozhari, Rhodope Mountains
  - coordinates: 42°31′45.84″N 24°22′33.96″E
  - elevation: 1,558 m (5,112 ft)
- Mouth
  - location: Maritsa
  - coordinates: 42°8′49.92″N 24°36′51.84″E
  - elevation: 168 m (551 ft)
- Length: 112 km (70 mi)
- Basin size: 1,645 km^{2} (635 sq mi)

Basin features
- Progression: Maritsa→ Aegean Sea

The Vacha (Bulgarian: Въча) is a river in southern Bulgaria, a right tributary of the river Maritsa. The 112 km long Vacha is the 23rd longest river of Bulgaria and the second longest in the Rhodope Mountains, following the Arda (272 km), another major Maritsa tributary. The Vacha drains significant area of the western Rhodope Mountains, including the ridges Batak Mountain, Veliyshko–Videnishki, Pereliksko–Prespanski and Chernatitsa.

== Geography ==
The Buynovska reka is considered the main stem of the river and takes its source at an altitude of 1,558 m in the western Rhodope Mountains at 3.4 km southeast of the village of Kozhari, in the immediate vicinity of the Bulgaria–Greece border. The main river is formed at the confluence of the Buynovska reka (left) and the Chairdere (right) at an altitude of 847 m in the village of Teshel.

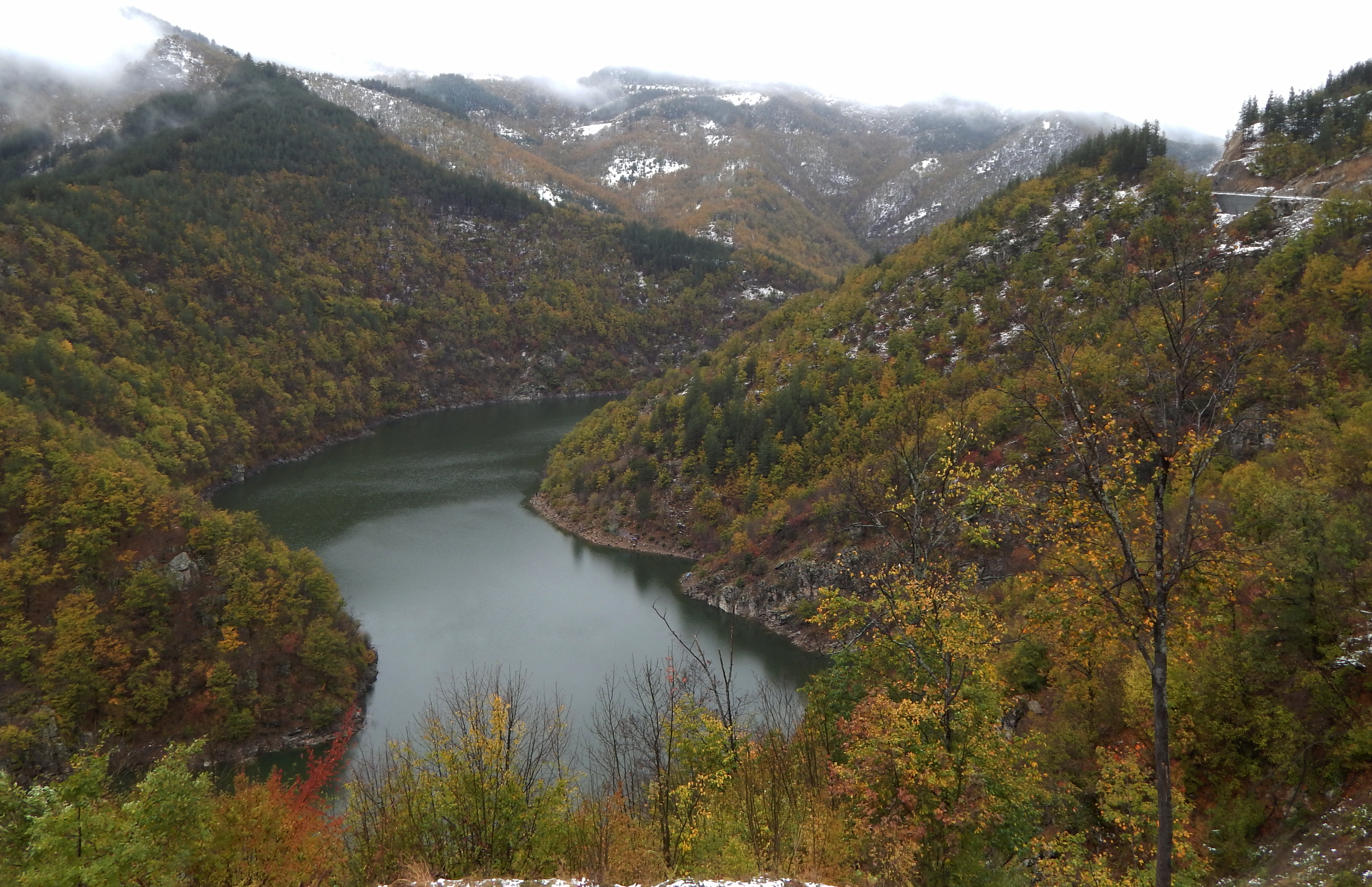
The Vacha at Kastrakli

In its uppermost course it flows in a northwestern direction in a wide valley, covered with meadows, forests and small farms. Downstream of the village of Buynovo, the river turns north and along most of its course flows through deep canyon-like valley until it enters the Upper Thracian Plain at the town of Krichim. In that section, there are only a few places where the valley widens — at the settlements of Teshel, Grohotno, Devin and Mihalkovo. In the Upper Thracian Plain the current is slow, in a wide sandy riverbed with protective dikes. The Vacha flows into the Maritsa at an altitude of 163 m about 1.3 km northeast of the village of Kadievo.

Its drainage basin covers a territory of 1,645 km^{2} or 3.1% of Maritsa's total and borders the drainage basins of the Parvenetska reka and Chepelarska reka to the east, the Arda to the southeast, the Mesta to the southwest and the Chepinska reka and Stara reka to the west. The river receives numerous tributaries, the most important being the Devinska reka (57 km, left), the Shirokolashka reka (29 km, right) and the Gashnya (20 km, left).

The Vacha has rain-snow feed with high water in April–May and low water in October. The average annual discharge at Krichim is 22 m^{3}/s.

== Ecology ==
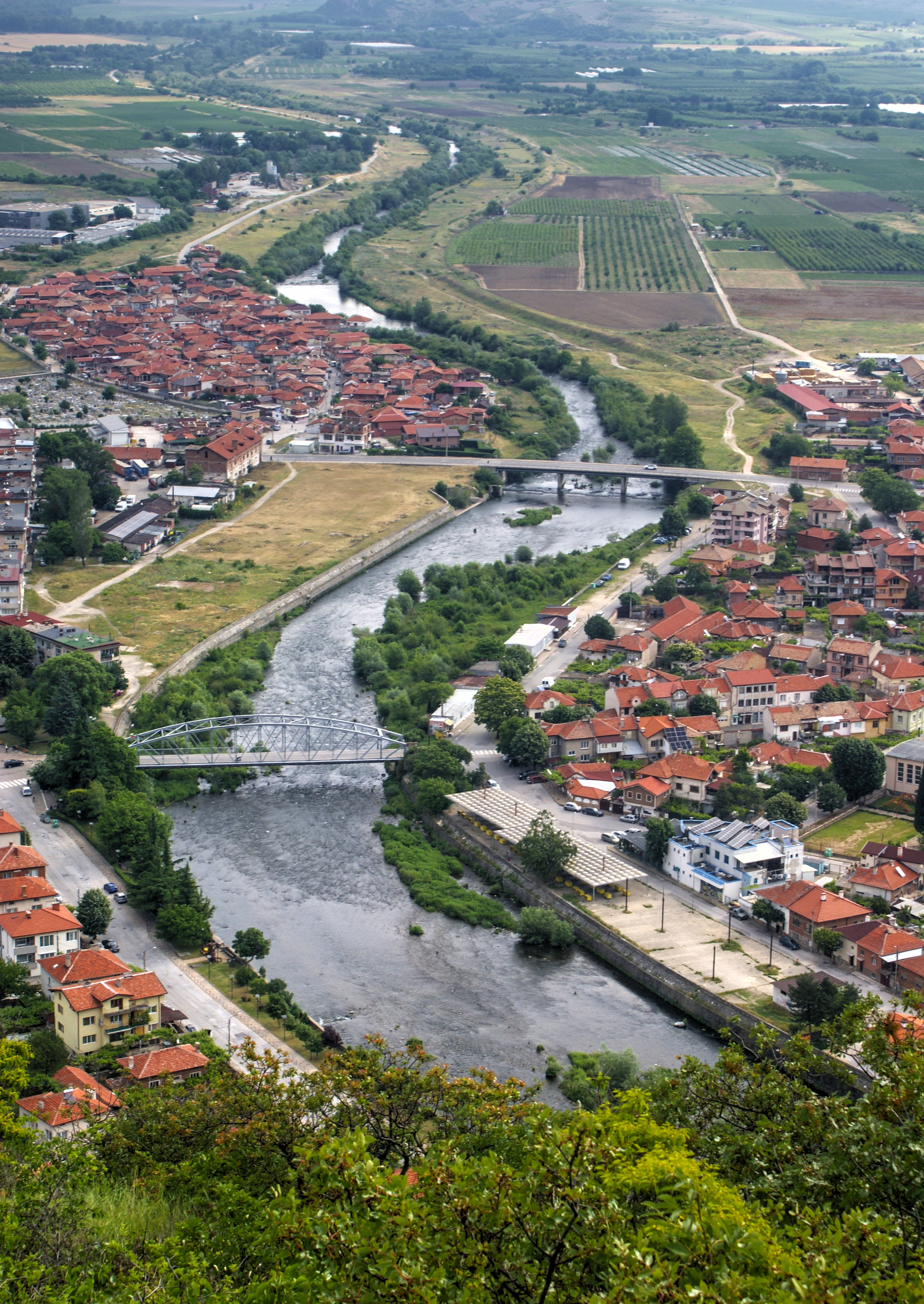
Lower course at Krichim

The river and the reservoirs along its course are rich in fish, including autochthonous species such as Macedonian vimba, stone loach, spined loach, round-scaled barbel, river trout, northern pike and the critically endangered European eel. The asp is considered extinct from the river.

The lower valley of the Vacha is among the prime butterfly areas of Bulgaria, where several species of conservational importance are found, including Zerynthia polyxena, Pieris ergane, Scolitantides orion, Glaucopsyche alexis, Apatura metis, Neptis rivularis, Nymphalis xanthomelas and Melitaea trivia.

There are several protected areas along the river. Izgoryaloto Gyune nature reserve along its left banks south of Krichim conserves the only population of Greek juniper (Juniperus excelsa) in the Rhodope Mountains, and one of the two in Bulgaria. Another nature reserve along its course is Kastrakli near Devin, established to protect old-growth forests of Austrian pine (Pinus nigra). Its lower course is included in the River Vacha Thrace protected area under Natura 2000 to conserve hydrophilic communities of tall grasses, alluvial forests of common alder (Alnus glutinosa) and European ash (Fraxinus excelsior) and riparian galleries of white willow (Salix alba) and silver poplar (Populus alba).

== Settlements and water use ==
The river flows entirely in Smolyan and Plovdiv Provinces, and along a stretch in its middle course forms the boundary between those two provinces and Pazardzhik Province. There are ten settlements along its course, two towns and eight villages: Kozhari, Buynovo, Teshel, Grohotno, Devin (town) and Mihalkovo in Smolyan Province and Krichim (town), Kurtovo Konare, Yoakim Gruevo and Kadievo in Plovdiv Province. There two main roads along its valley, an 11.3 km stretch of the third class III-197 road Gotse Delchev–Dospat–Devin follows the river between Teshel and Devin, and a 58.1 km stretch of the third class III-866 road Smolyan–Devin–Stamboliyski follows it between Devin and Stamboliyski. Following the construction of the Tsankov Kamak Hydro Power Plant in 2010, a 16.6 km section of the road was submerged and a new one was constructed via the village of Lyaskovo.

The waters of the Vacha are used for electricity generation, as the main part of the Dospat–Vacha Hydropower Cascade (500.2 MW). There are four reservoirs constructed along its course, all of them with hydro power stations: Teshel (60 MW), Tsankov Kamak (86.4 MW), Vacha (164.8 MW) and Krichim (80 MW). Part of the waters of the upper course of the tributaries Devnenska reka and Gashnya are diverted west to the Batak Hydropower Cascade (254 MW). Its waters are also used for irrigation in the Upper Thracian Plain and the small valleys along its course, as well as for part of the potable water supply of Bulgaria’s second largest city Plovdiv.

== Landmarks ==
The narrow and steep Buynovo Gorge is located along the left fork of Vacha’s headwaters, the Buynovska reka, and the similarly dramatic Trigrad Gorge is formed along the Trigradska reka, a tributary of its right fork, the Chairdere, both included in the 100 Tourist Sites of Bulgaria. The area along the gorges is rich in rock formations, such as stone arches, as well as numerous caves, including the show caves Yagodinska and Devil’s Throat. There are mineral springs at Devin, an important spa town, and Mihalkovo, the only naturally aerated water spring in Bulgaria.

== Gallery ==
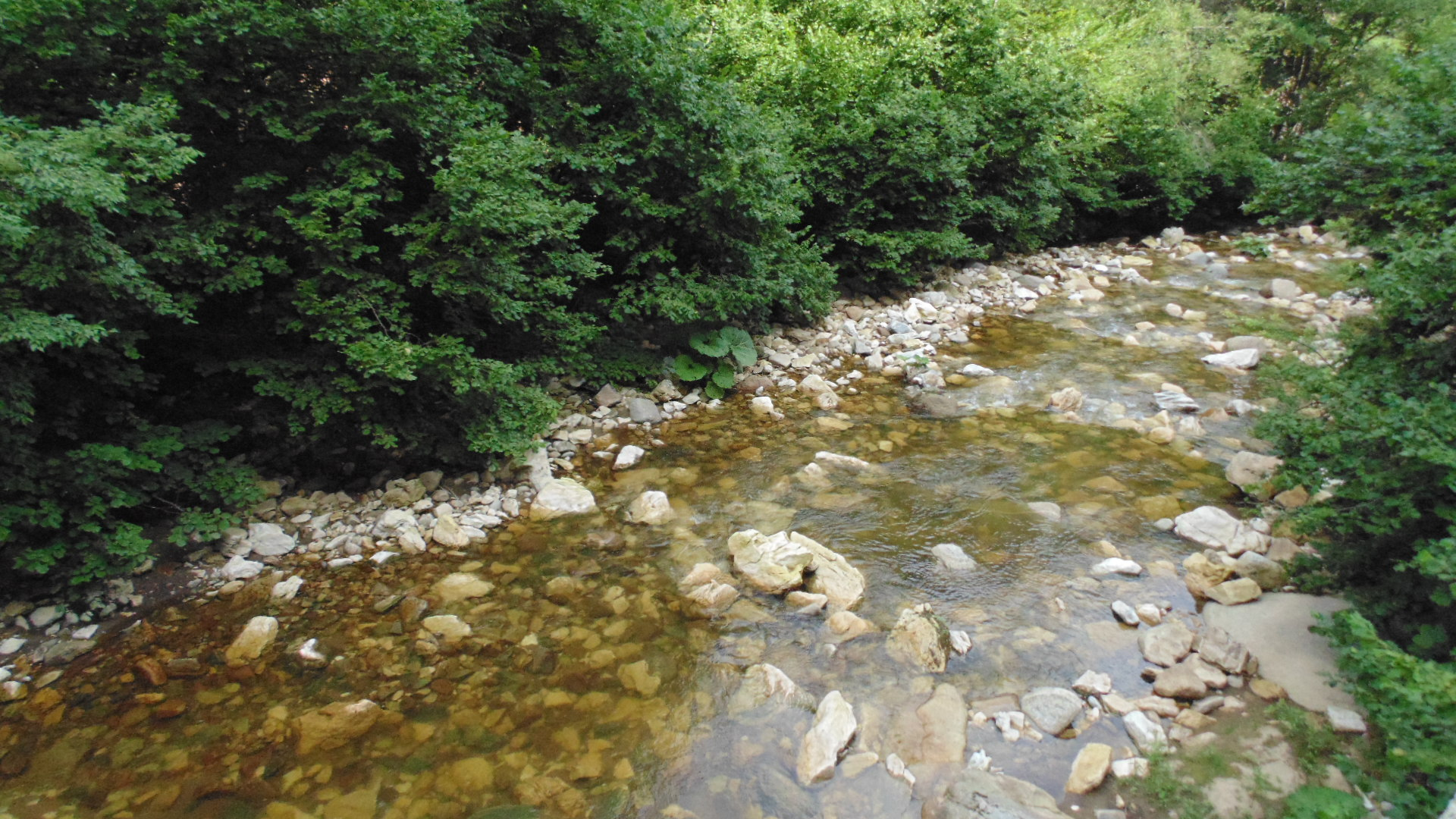
Upper course

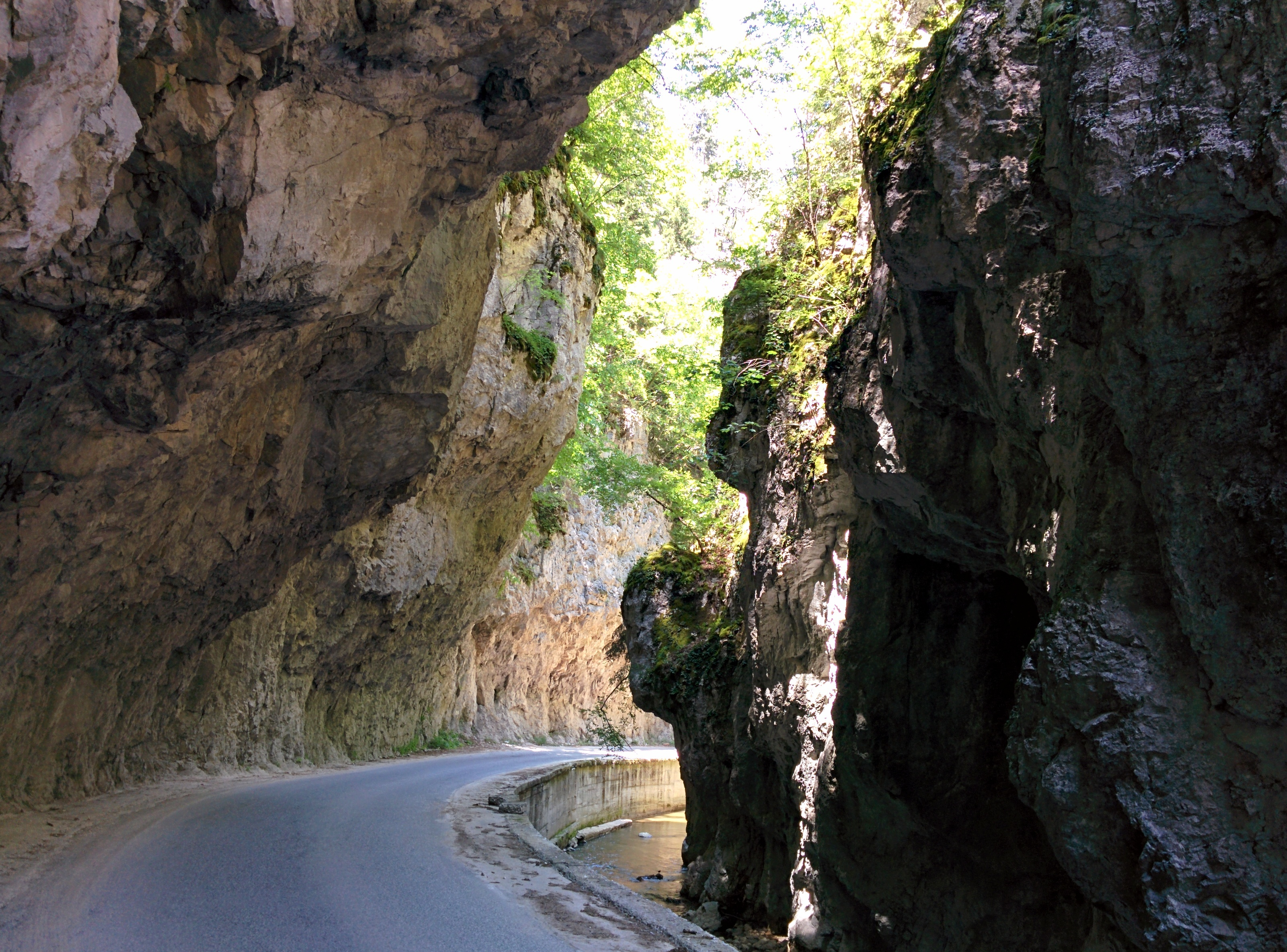
At Buynovo Gorge

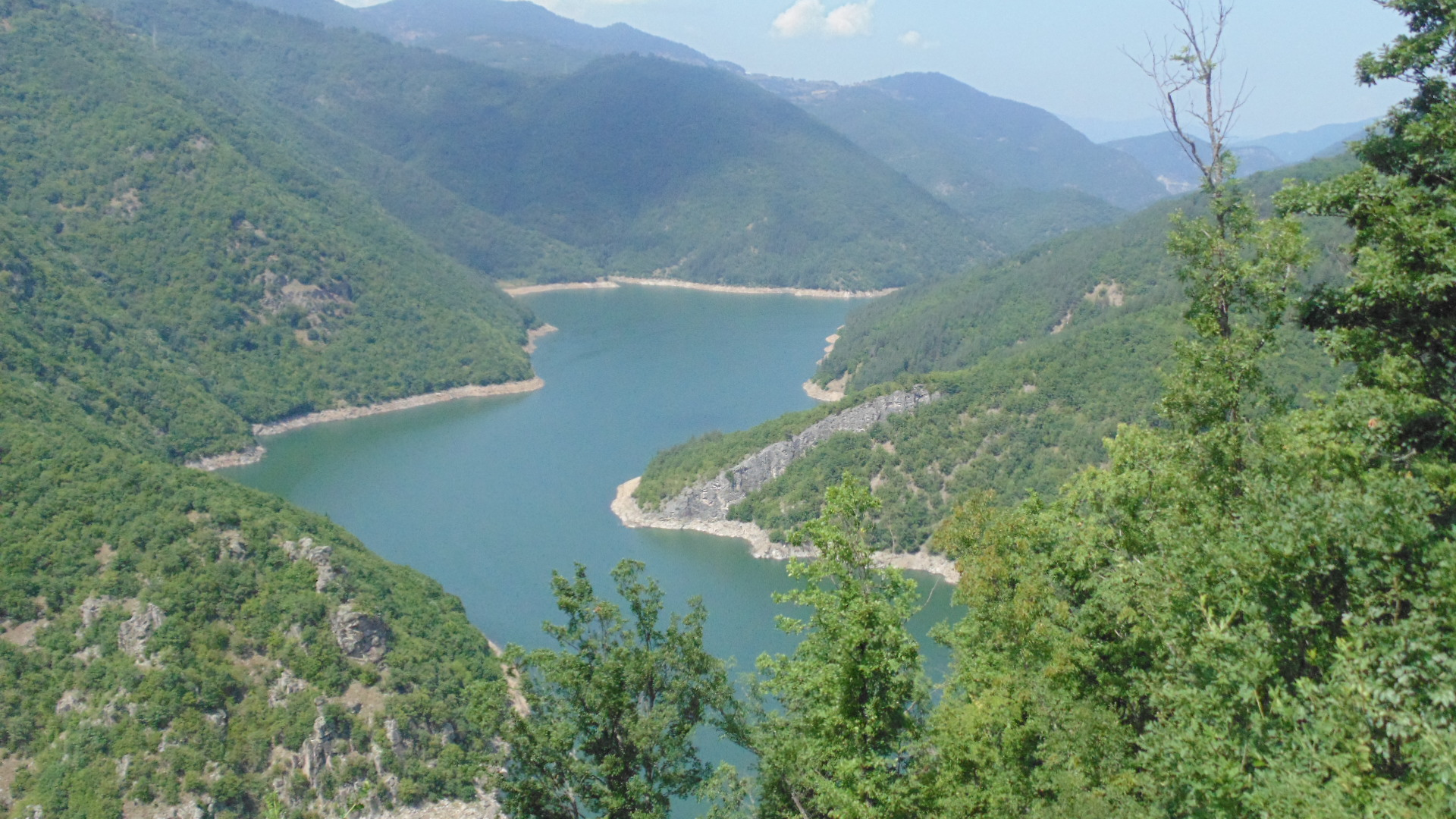
At Tsankov Kamak

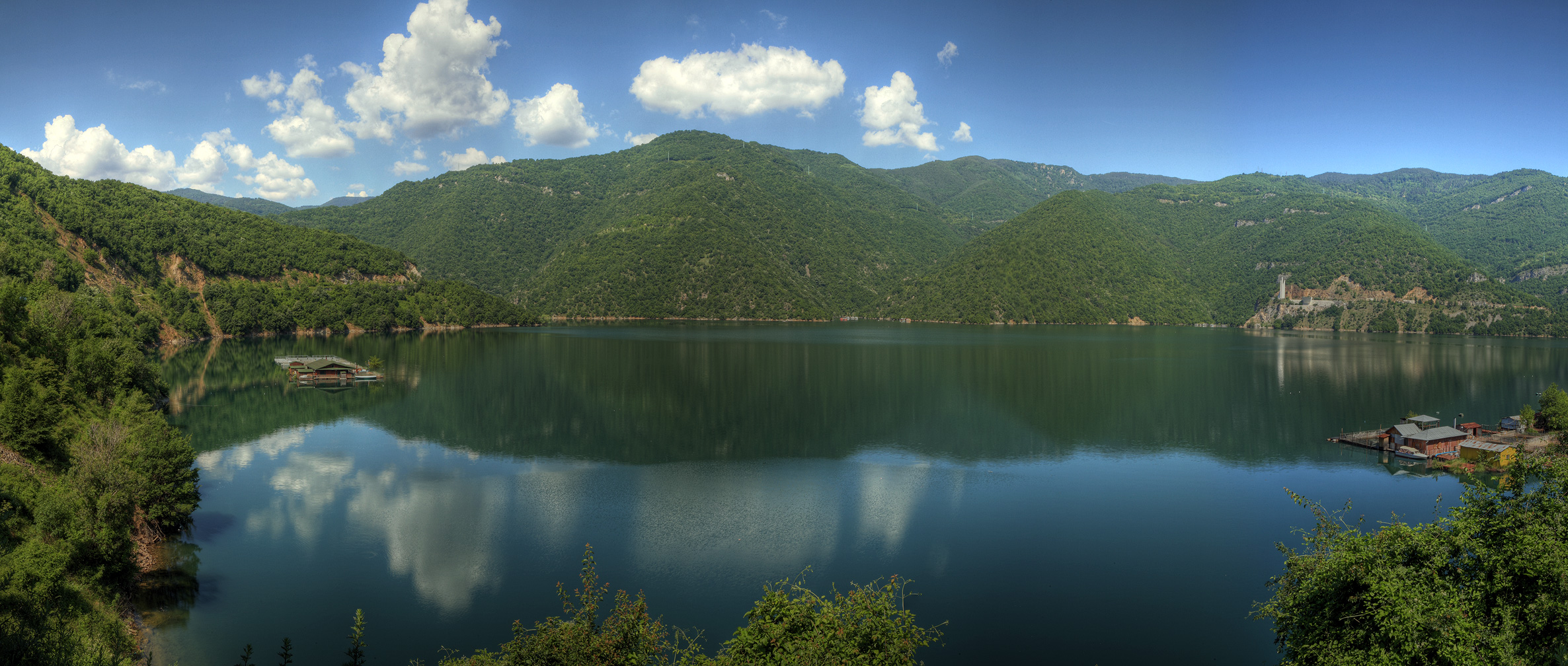
At Vacha Reservoir
