= Yagodinska Cave =

Cave in the Rhodope Mountains, Bulgaria

- Ягодинска пещера
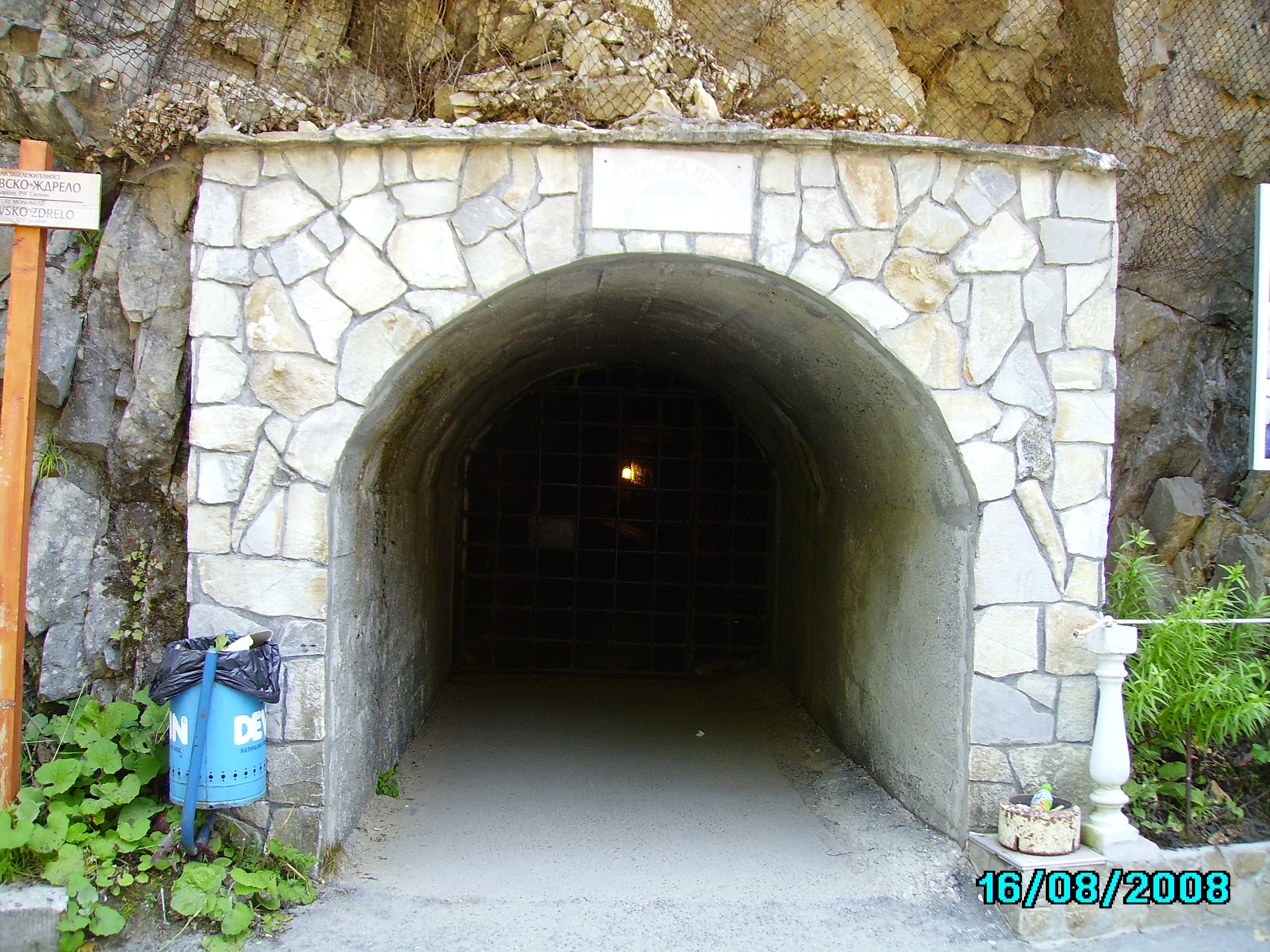
- Cave entrance

- Location within Bulgaria
- Location: Yagodina, Smolyan Province
- Coordinates: 41°36′0″N 24°18′0″E
- Length: 10,500 m (34,400 ft)
- Height variation: 6 m (20 ft)
- Elevation: 930 m (3,050 ft)
- Difficulty: easy
- Lighting: yes

Yagodinska Cave (Bulgarian: Ягодинска пещера) is a cave in the Rhodope Mountains, southern Bulgaria. It is included in the 100 Tourist Sites of Bulgaria and is named after the homonymous village nearby. With a total length of 10,500 m, Yagodinska is the fourth longest cave in the country after Kolkina Dupka, Duhlata and Orlova Chuka and the longest in the Rhodopes. Yagodinska Cave is home to 11 species of bats.

== Location ==
Yagodinska Cave is on the right bank of the river Buynovska, a tributary to the Vacha, on the slopes of the Buynovo Gorge — one the longest gorges in Bulgaria. It is in Smolyan Province, 20 km south of the town of Devin and 3 km south-west of the village of Yagodina. The cave is accessible from the Devin–Dospat road and has a parking lot. The cave entrance is at an altitude of 930 m.

== Exploration and description ==
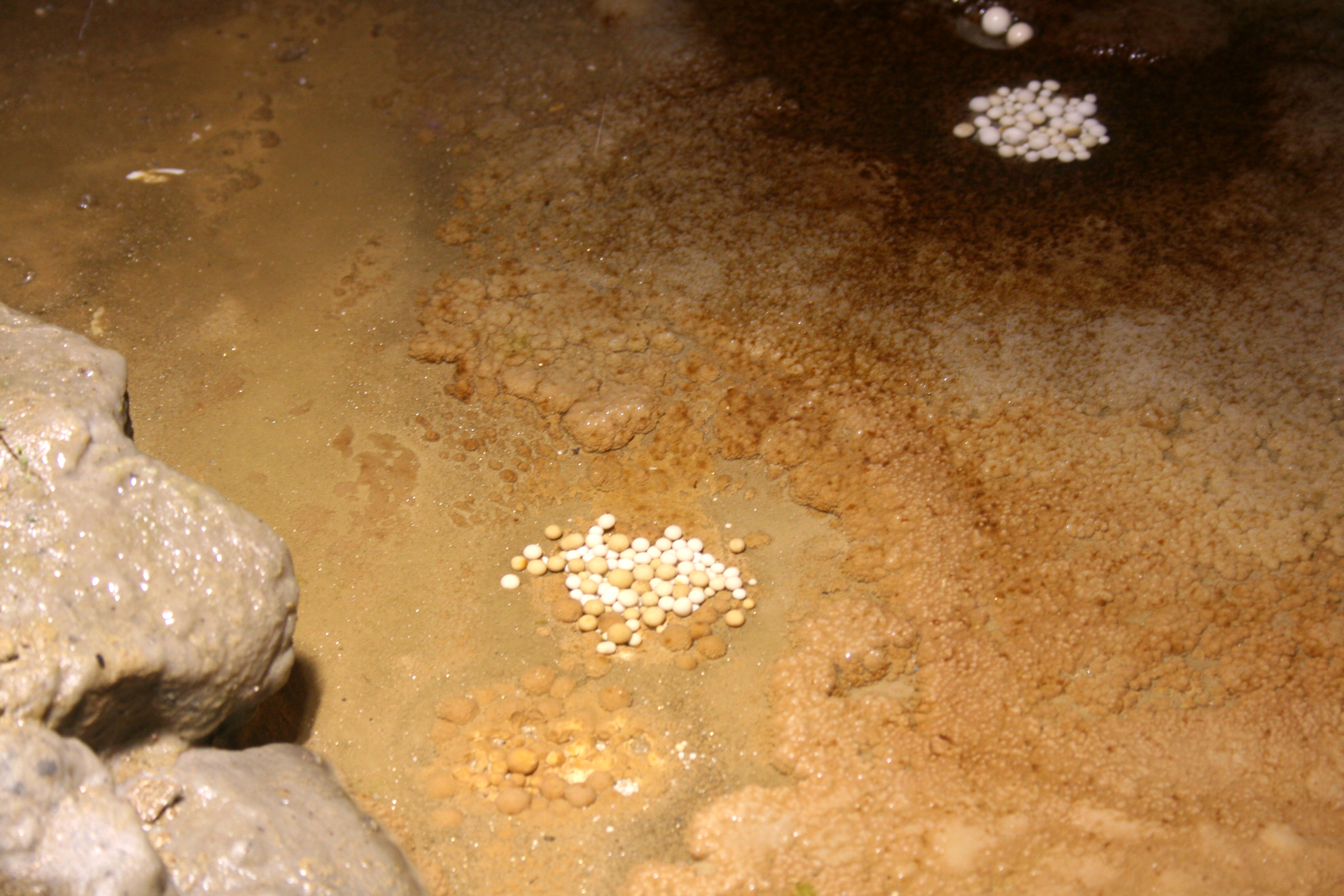
Cave pearls in Yagodinska cave

The exploration of the cave commenced in 1963 by the Speleological Club of Chepelare, led by Dimitar Raychev. Initially 8,500 m was explored, and 2,000 m more galleries were discovered during the second mapping of the cave in 1982-1986. The age of the cave is estimated at 275,000 years.

Yagodinska Cave is 10,500 m long and has three levels, of which a 1,100 m path in the lowest level was electrified in 1971–1982 and opened for tourists. The entrance and the exit for that level are artificial tunnels with lengths of 150 and 80 m respectively. The altitudes of the entrance and the exit are 930 m and 937 m respectively. The temperature in the show cave is constant all year round at 6ºС; the humidity is 85%–91%.

Yagodinska contains a very large number of cave formations, or speleothems, including stalactites, stalagmites, stalagnates, flowstone, draperies and cave pearls.

The natural entrance leads to the uppermost level, where an ancient dwelling dated to the 4th millennium BC was discovered. Excavations have shown that the dwelling was an important centre for producing ceramics. The clay was extracted from the interior of the cave and from the bed of the Boynovska River, and the pottery was baked in clay furnaces. The inhabitants abandoned the site as a result of a collapse caused by an earthquake.

== Fauna ==
Yagodinska Cave is an important site for bats due to the large length of its galleries. It is home to 11 species of bats. Of these, six species are of conservation importance in Europe: the greater and the lesser horseshoe bats, the greater and lesser mouse-eared bats, Bechstein's bat and Geoffroy's bat.

List of the recorded species:

- Greater horseshoe bat (Rhinolophus ferrumequinum)
- Lesser horseshoe bat (Rhinolophus hipposideros)
- Bechstein's bat (Myotis bechsteinii)
- Geoffroy's bat (Myotis emarginatus)
- Greater mouse-eared bat (Myotis myotis)
- Lesser mouse-eared bat (Myotis blythii)
- Whiskered bat (Myotis mystacinus)
- Daubenton's bat (Myotis daubentonii)
- Serotine bat (Eptesicus serotinus)
- Brown long-eared bat (Plecotus auritus)
- Grey long-eared bat (Plecotus austriacus)

== See also ==
- Geography of Bulgaria
- List of caves in Bulgaria
- List of protected areas of Bulgaria
- List of rock formations in Bulgaria
