= Trigrad Gorge =

Gorge in Bulgaria

- Триградско ждрело
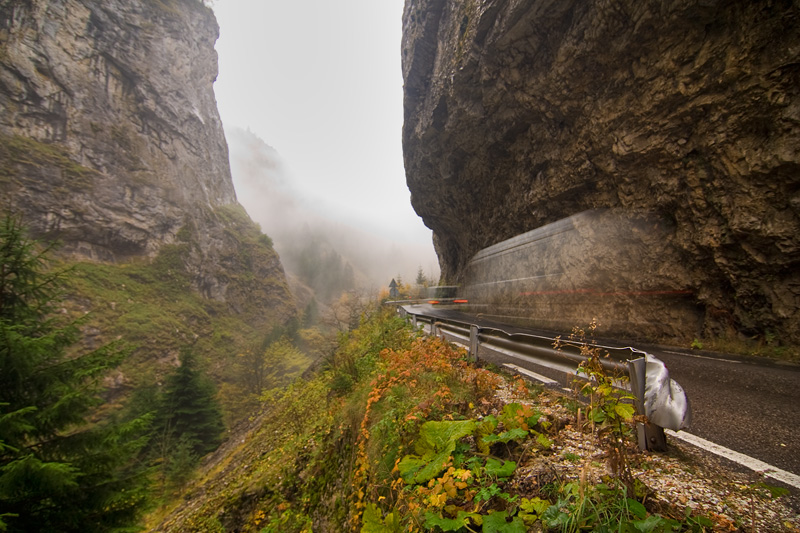
- The Trigrad Gorge in autumn

- Location within Bulgaria
- Floor elevation: 1,450 m (4,760 ft)

Geology
- Type: Gorge

Geography
- Coordinates: 41°37′0″N 24°22′45″E
- Interactive map of Trigrad Gorge

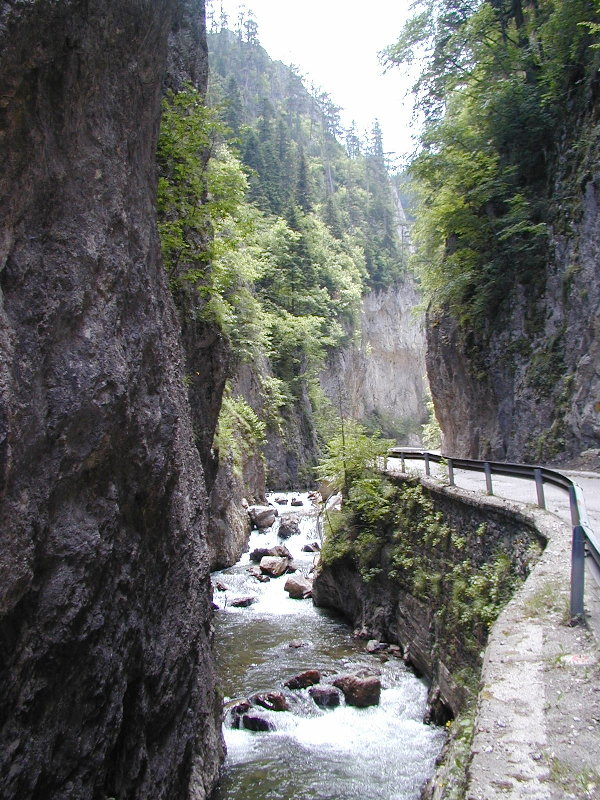
The Trigrad Gorge

The Trigrad Gorge (Bulgarian: Триградско ждрело, pronounced [triˈɡratsko ʒdrɛˈɫɔ]) is a canyon of vertical marble rocks in the Rhodope Mountains, part of the Dobrostan Formation (Proterozoic). It is in Smolyan Province, one of the southernmost provinces of Bulgaria.

The gorge encloses the course of the Trigradska River, which plunges into the Devil's Throat Cave and 530 metres (1,740 ft) further emerges as a large karst spring. It later flows into the River Buynovska.

The gorge's west wall reaches 300 metres (980 ft) in height, while the east one extends up to 300–350 metres (980–1,150 ft). Initially, the two walls are about 300 m apart, but the gorge narrows to about 100 metres (330 ft) in the northern section. The gorge is 1.2 kilometres (0.75 mi) from the village of Trigrad at 1,450 metres (4,760 ft) above sea level and has a total length of 7 kilometres (4.3 mi), of which the gorge proper comprises 2–3 kilometres (1.2–1.9 mi). The Trigrad Gorge forms one of only three river-carved gorges in the world cut entirely through pure marble ranking alongside Bhedaghat Gorge in Jabalpur, India and Taroko Gorge in Taiwan.

The gorge has been managed for tourist visits since 1977, and has been a protected area of 710.57 hectares since the early 1960s.

== Honour ==
Trigrad Gap on Livingston Island in the South Shetland Islands, Antarctica, is named after Trigrad settlement and gorge.
