= Devil's Throat Cave =

Cave in Bulgaria

Coordinates: 41.61°N 24.38°E

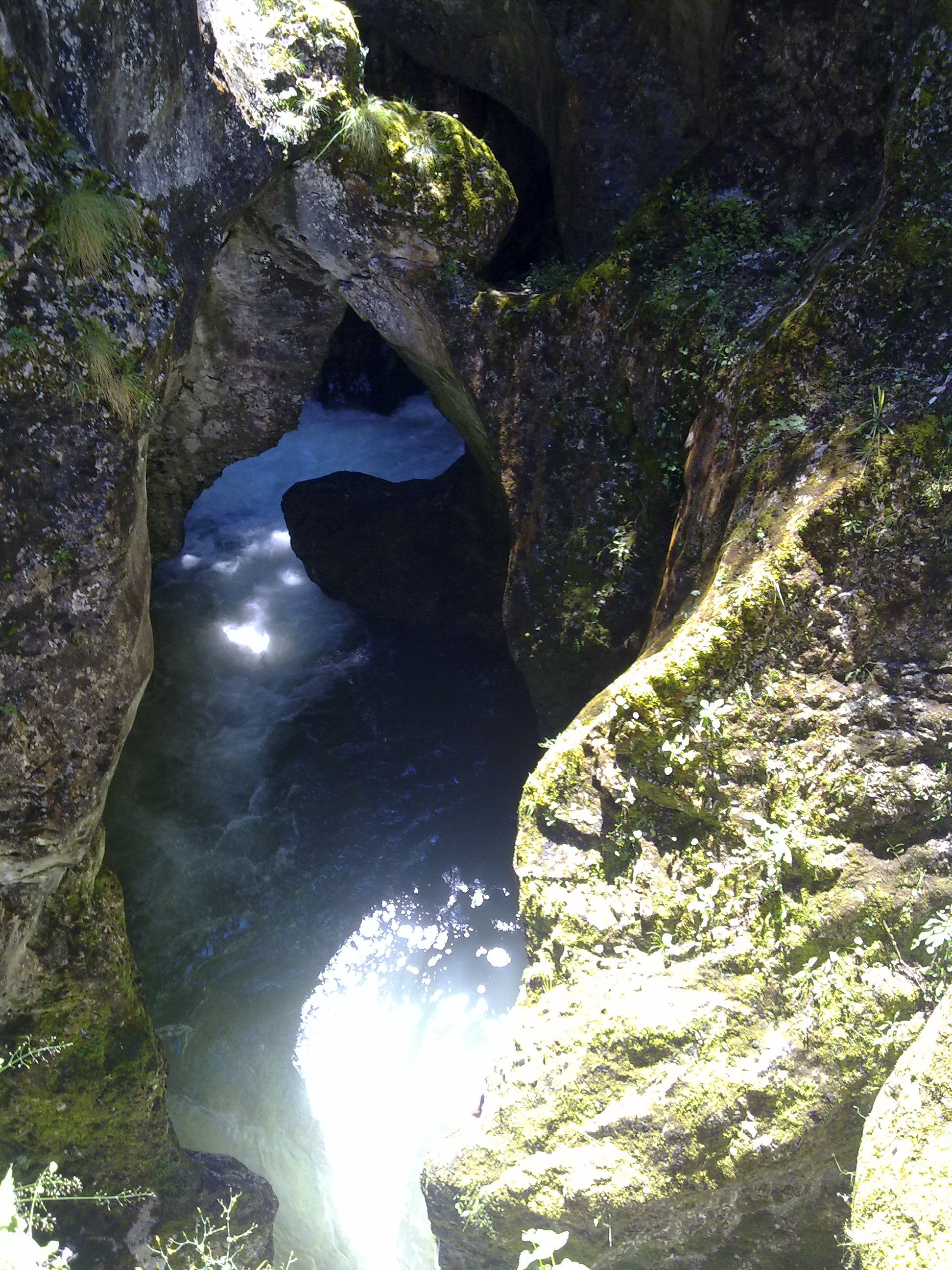
Devil's Throat Cave from above

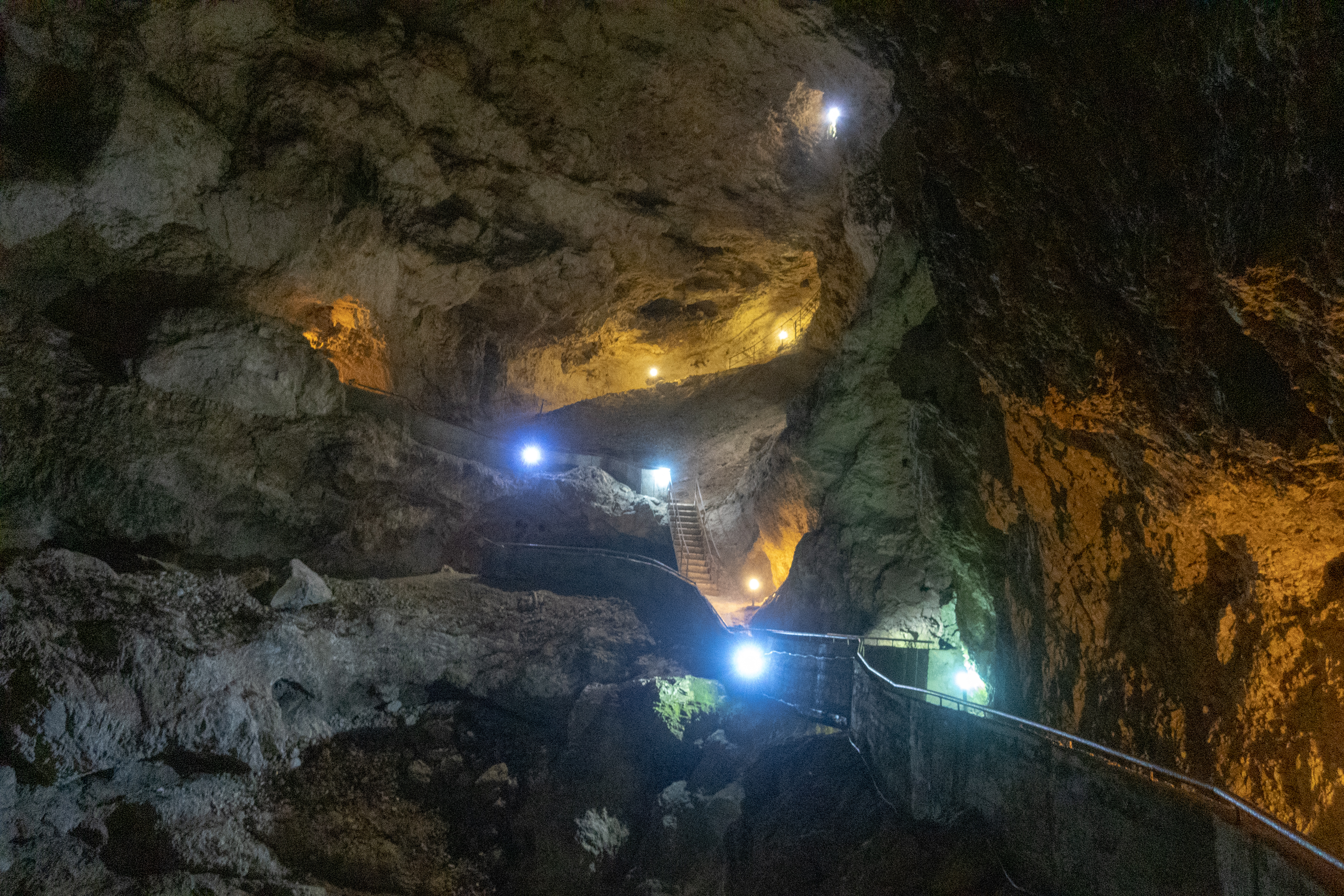
Devil's Throat Cave

Devil's Throat Cave, or Dyavolsko Garlo (Bulgarian: Дяволското гърло [ˈdʲavoɫskoto ˈɡɤrɫo]), is located in the western Rhodopes close to the village of Gyovren in Bulgaria, near its border with Greece. A popular tourist attraction, Devil's Throat branches from Trigrad Gorge.

The cave’s entrance resembles a devil’s head, and down its throat rushes a massive waterfall that from ancient times has given birth to numerous legends.

It is a fact that nothing carried by the river into The Devil’s Throat Cave emerges back from it. Many attempts have been made to track pieces of wood and other material through the cave, but they all vanish without a trace in the underground river. Experiments performed with dyes have shown that it takes more than an hour and a half for the water to traverse the short distance from one opening to the next, fueling speculations about an extensive system of underground streams in the cave.

== Cave diving incident ==
In 1970, two Bulgarian cave divers, Siana Ljutzkanova and Evstati Jovchev, attempted to explore the sump (underwater cave) below the waterfall, which is one of the deepest and most mysterious parts of the cave. They never resurfaced, and despite efforts to recover them, neither their bodies nor their diving equipment were found. This incident has since deterred many further explorations.
