= List of power stations in Bulgaria =

Location of the major power plants in Bulgaria

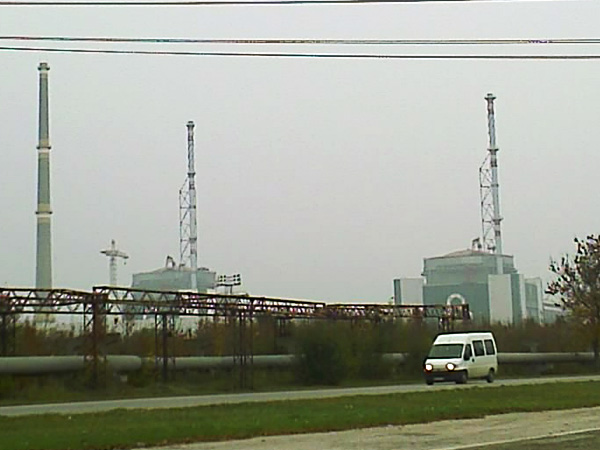
Units 5 and 6 of Kozloduy NPP

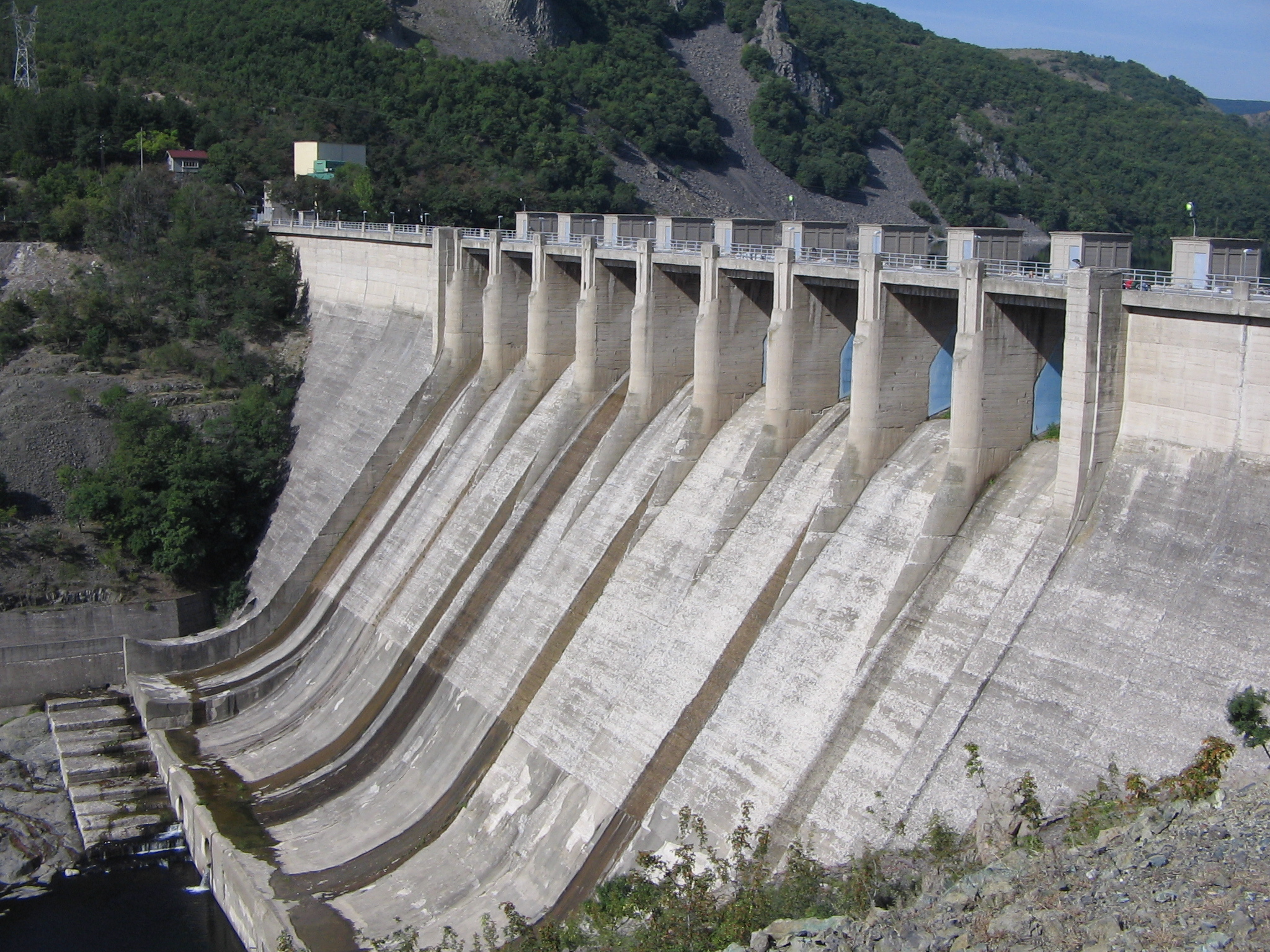
Studen Kladenets Hydro plant

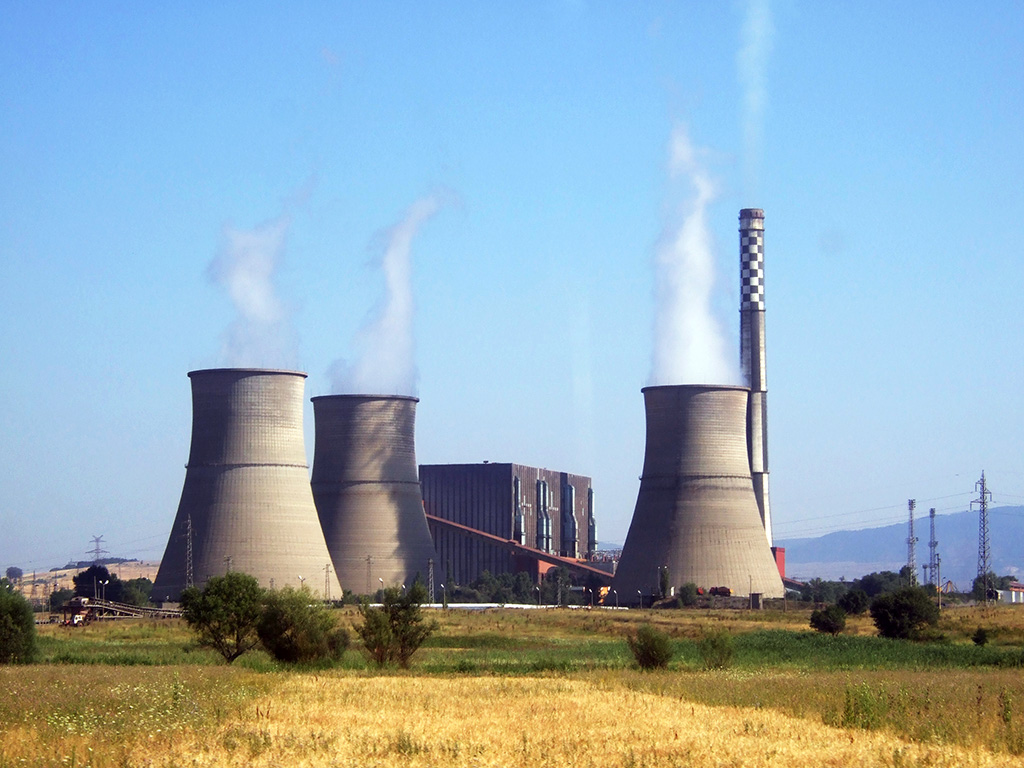
Bobov dol TPP

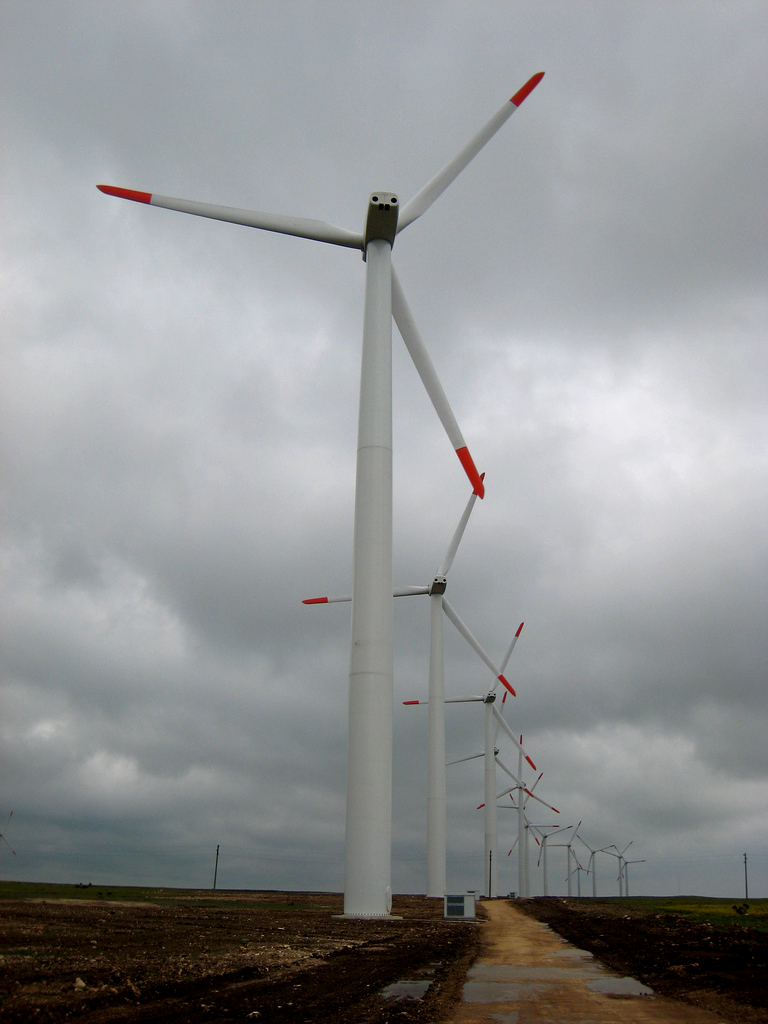
Kaliakra Wind Farm

This is a list of power stations located in Bulgaria. The list may be incomplete.

== Nuclear ==
Total current capacity: 2,000 MW

Name	Location	Coordinates	Type	Capacity, MWe	Operational	Notes
Kozloduy NPP Unit 1	Kozloduy	43.7473046°N 23.7673545°E	VVER	440	1974-2004	Shut down per EU demand
Kozloduy NPP Unit 2	Kozloduy	43.7484982°N 23.7680197°E	VVER	440	1975-2004	Shut down per EU demand
Kozloduy NPP Unit 3	Kozloduy	43.7410419°N 23.7756157°E	VVER	440	1980-2007	Shut down per EU demand
Kozloduy NPP Unit 4	Kozloduy	43.7402357°N 23.7783837°E	VVER	440	1982-2007	Shut down per EU demand
Kozloduy NPP Unit 5	Kozloduy	43.7476611°N 23.7698007°E	VVER	1000	1987-	Operational
Kozloduy NPP Unit 6	Kozloduy	43.746142°N 23.7689638°E	VVER	1000	1991-	Operational
Belene Nuclear Power Plant Unit 1	Belene	43.6294281°N 25.1867795°E	VVER	1000	Cancelled	The built reactor may be assembled as Unit 7 at Kozloduy Nuclear Power Plant.
Belene Nuclear Power Plant Unit 2	Belene		VVER	1000	Cancelled	

== Hydro ==
Total current capacity: >2,600 MW

Station	Town	Coordinates	Capacity (MW)	Notes
Aleko Hydro Power Plant	Aleko Konstantinovo	42.1194263°N 24.2889798°E	66	
Batak Hydro Power Plant	Batak	42.020685°N 24.201529°E	48	
Belmeken Hydro Power Plant	Sestrimo	42.1995137°N 23.8579917°E	375	
Chaira Hydro Power Plant	Sestrimo	42.1589498°N 23.8708448°E	840	
Devin Hydro Power Plant	Devin	41.7201526°N 24.424957°E	80	
Gorna Arda Hydro Power Plant			174.2	Under construction
Ivailovgrad Hydroelectric Power Station	Lambuh	41.5837352°N 26.1074424°E	104	
Kardzhali Hydroelectric Power Station	Kardzhali	41.6334391°N 25.339998°E	108	
Krichim Hydro Power Plant	Krichim	41.9917775°N 24.4680333°E	80	
Momina Klisura Hydroelectric Power Station	Momina Klisura	42.231944°N 23.949444°E	120	
Orphey Hydroelectric Power Station	Osikovo	41.9403077°N 24.4467902°E	160	
Peshtera Hydroelectric Power Station	Peshtera	42.016325°N 24.2617822°E	128	
Studen Kladenets Hydroelectric Power Station	Studen Kladenets	41.6194768°N 25.6414569°E	172	
Sestrimo Hydro Power Plant	Sestrimo	42.2083672°N 23.9158201°E	240	
Teshel Hydro Power Plant	Gyovren	41.6637673°N 24.3409181°E	60	
Tsankov Kamak Hydro Power Plant	Mihalkovo	41.8221821°N 24.4420481°E	80	Under construction
Vacha Hydro Power Plant I & II		?	14 (7 MW each)	

== Fossil fuel ==
Total current capacity: >7,200 MW

Power station	Town	Coordinates	Fuel	Installed capacity (MW)	Remarks
Bobov Dol Power Plant	Bobov Dol	42.285508°N 23.031871°E	Coal	630	
Maritsa 3 Power Plant	Dimitrovgrad	42.053196°N 25.623229°E	Coal	120	
Maritsa Iztok-1	Galabovo	42.154655°N 25.907822°E	Coal	670	
Maritsa Iztok-2	Radetski	42.255840°N 26.134157°E	Coal	1456	325 metres tall chimney
Maritsa Iztok-3	Mednikarovo	42.143773°N 26.003137°E	Coal	900	325 metres tall chimney
Republika Power Plant	Pernik	42.606429°N 23.078445°E	Coal	180	
Ruse Iztok Power Plant	Ruse	43.866241°N 26.009316°E	Coal	180	
Sofia Power Plant	Sofia	42.720218°N 23.323331°E	Natural gas	130	
Sofia Iztok Power Plant	Sofia	42.651676°N 23.416876°E	Natural gas	100	
Varna Power Plant	Varna	43.196166°N 27.764661°E	Natural gas	210	

== Solar ==
Total current capacity: 61 MW

- Karadzhalovo Solar Park - 60.4 MW, the largest in the Balkan region in 2012
- Pobeda Solar Park 50 MW in 2012
- Paunovo - 1 MW
- Tervel / General Toshevo - 60 kW, planned
- Tervel - 5 MW, planned

A 150 MW / 600 MWh grid battery opened in 2026.

== Wind ==
Total current capacity: 456,2 MW

- Buzludzha - 50 MW, currently in testing, to be fully operational before 2011
- St. Nikola Wind Farm - Kavarna - 156 MW (52 turbines)
- Wind Farm Acorn Energy - Hrabrovo - 6 MW (3 turbines)
- Suvororo Wind Farm - Suvorovo - 60 MW (30 turbines)
- Balchik Wind Farm - Balchik - 10 MW (5 turbines)
- Kaliakra WPP - Kaliakra - 35 MW (35 turbines)
- Mogilishte-Zapad - Mogilishte - 17,6 MW (10 turbines)
- Vertocom Wind Farm - Kazanlak - 72,5 MW (29 turbines)
- Vranino Wind Farm - Dobrich - 18 MW (9 turbines)
- Karapelit Wind Farm - Dobrich - 12 MW (6 turbines)
- Krupen Wind Farm - Dobrich - 12 MW (4 turbines)
- Kardam Wind Farm - Dobrich - 12,6 MW (4 turbines)
- Shabla Wind Farm - Dobrich - 42 MW (14 turbines)
- Somovit wind turbine - 2.5 MW, single turbine

== See also ==
- Energy in Bulgaria
