= Tsankov =

Tsankov may refer to:

- Tsankov (surname)
- Tsankov Dam on the Vacha River in Bulgaria
- Tsankov Kamak Hydro Power Plant in southwestern Bulgaria
- Dragan Tsankov Boulevard in Sofia, Bulgaria
