= Orphey Hydroelectric Power Station =

Hydroelectric power plant in Bulgaria

Orphey Hydro Power Plant
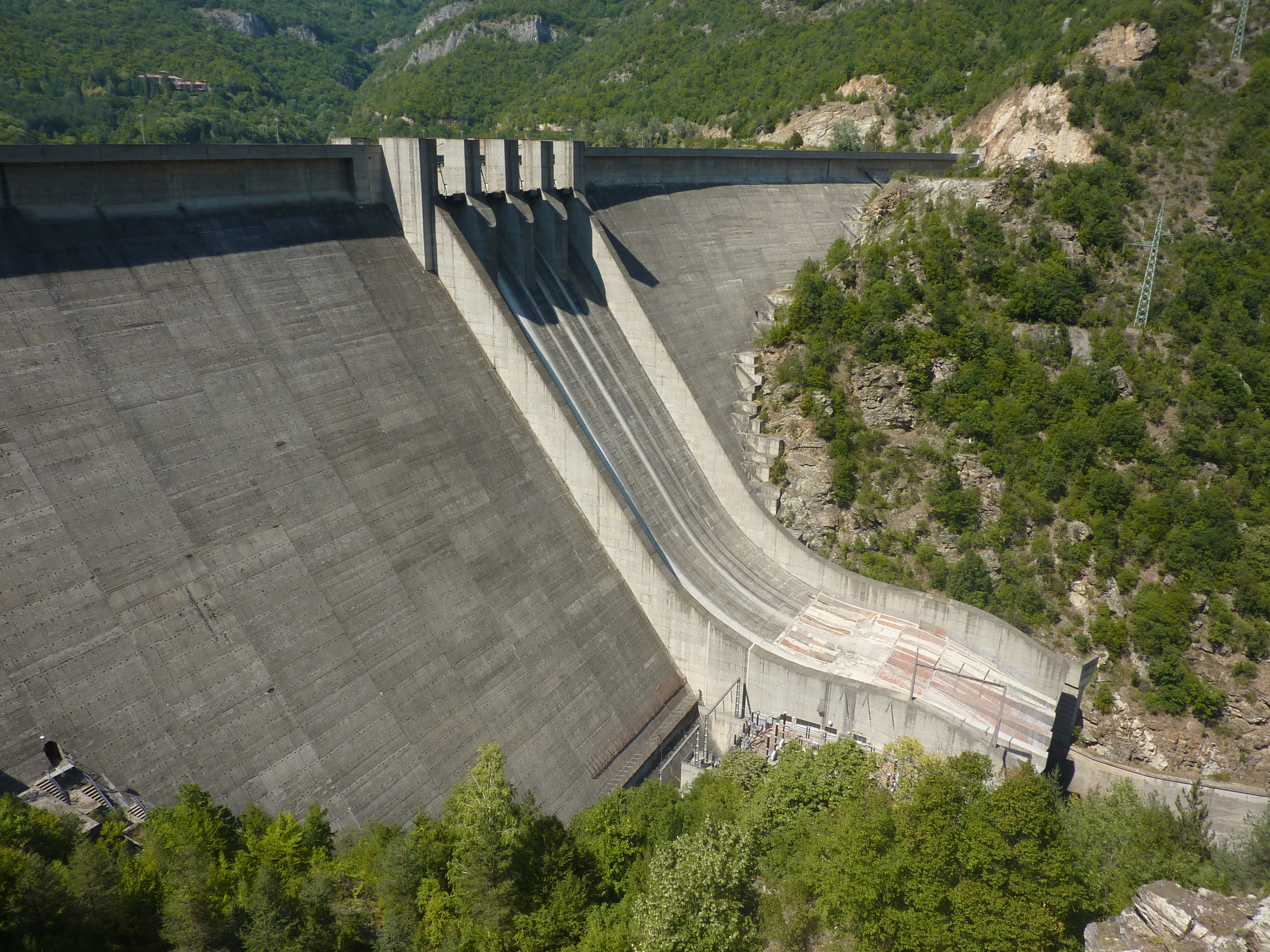
- Country: Bulgaria
- Location: Krichim
- Coordinates: 41°56′33″N 24°27′8″E
- Status: Operational
- Owner(s): NEK EAD

Reservoir
- Creates: Vacha Reservoir

Power Station
- Installed capacity: 164.8 MW

The Orphey Pumpted Storage Hydro Power Plant (Bulgarian: Помпено-акумулираща водноелектрическа централа "Орфей") is an active hydro power project near Krichim in the Rhodope Mountains, southern Bulgaria. It has 4 individual Francis turbines which deliver up to 164.8 MW of power. One of the turbines can be used as a pump as well (38 MW), making this power plant a pumped storage type. The power plant uses water from the Vacha Reservoir along the homonymous river, and is part of the Dospat–Vacha Hydropower Cascade. The plant is named after Orpheus, who is said to have lived in these lands.
