= Teshel Reservoir =

Reservoir in Smolyan Province, Bulgaria

Teshel Dam
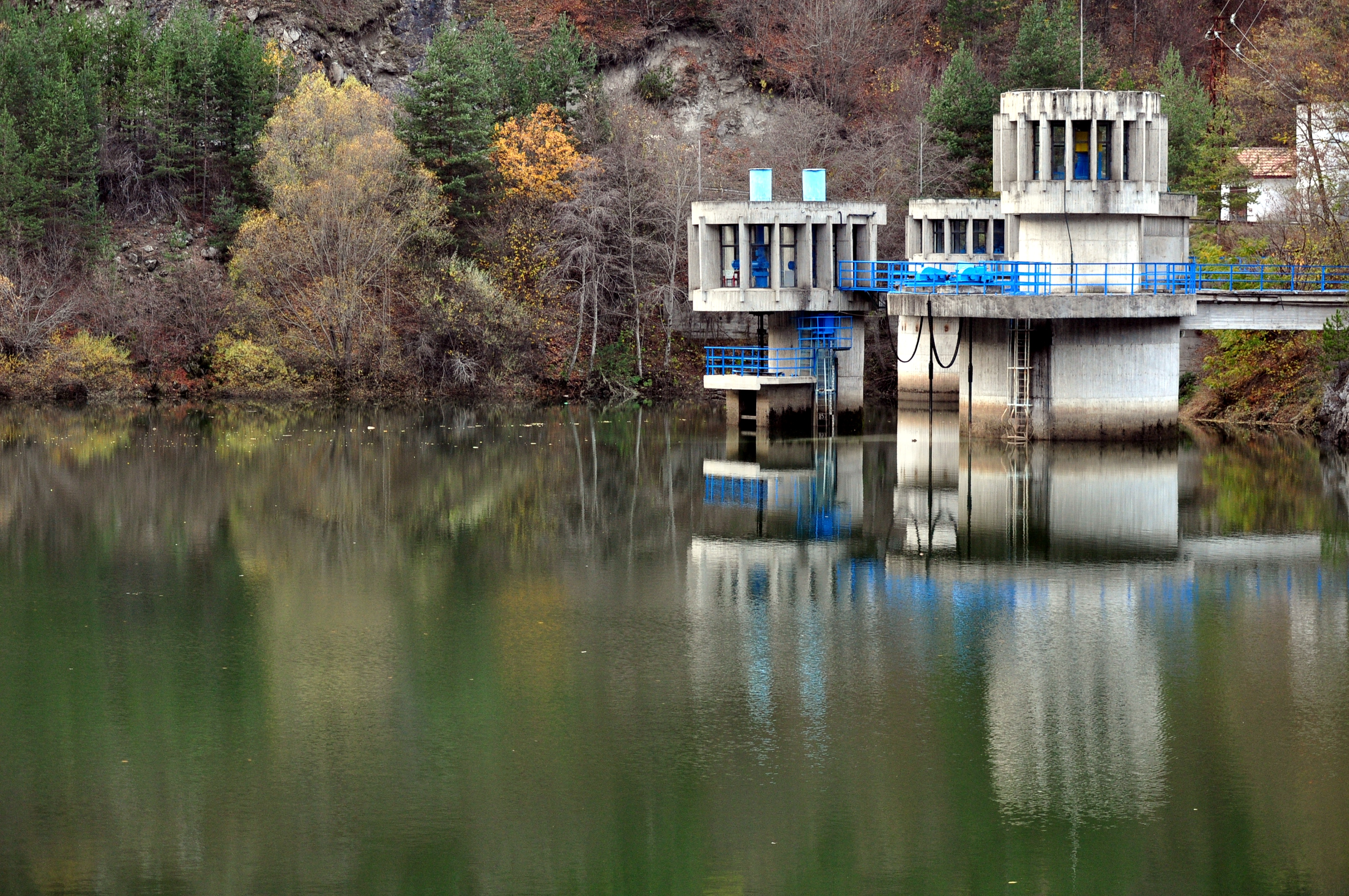

- Location of Teshel in Bulgaria
- Official name: Язовир Тешел (Bulgarian)
- Location: Rhodope Mountains near Teshel
- Coordinates: 41°40′15″N 24°21′0″E
- Opening date: 1984

Dam and spillways
- Height: 30 m (98 ft)
- Length: 200 m (660 ft)

Reservoir
- Creates: Teshel Reservoir
- Total capacity: 1,400,000 m^{3} (1,100 acre⋅ft)
- Surface area: 0.1 km^{2} (25 acres)

Teshel (Bulgarian: Тешел) is a small reservoir situated in the Western Rhodope Mountains of southern Bulgaria. Its lies in Borino Municipality in the western part of Smolyan Province, between the lands of the villages of Borino and Yagodina. It is part of the Dospat–Vacha Hydropower Cascade (500.2 MW) and is owned by the National Electric Company (NEK).

The reservoir is located downstream of the Buynovo Gorge on the river Vacha at the village of Teshel. It was inaugurated in 1984 and serves as a daily equalizer of the nearby Teshel Hydro Power Plant (60 MW). Its dam forms a lake with an area of 0.1 km^{2} and a volume of 1.4 million m^{3}.

The dam reaches a height of 30 m and a length of 200 m. It was constructed over a complex geological foundation, which necessitated numerous changes in the project, including during construction. The spillway has a capacity of 354 m^{3}/s and carries the water through a 400 m long tunnel. The main volume of the reservoir's waters are led through a water tower to the main pressure derivation of the Devin Hydro Power Plant (88 MW).

Teshel reservoir is rich in fish, such as Eurasian carp, grass carp and Danube bleak, but fishing is prohibited.
