= Krichim Hydro Power Plant =

Hydroelectric power plant in Krichim, Plovdiv, Bulgaria

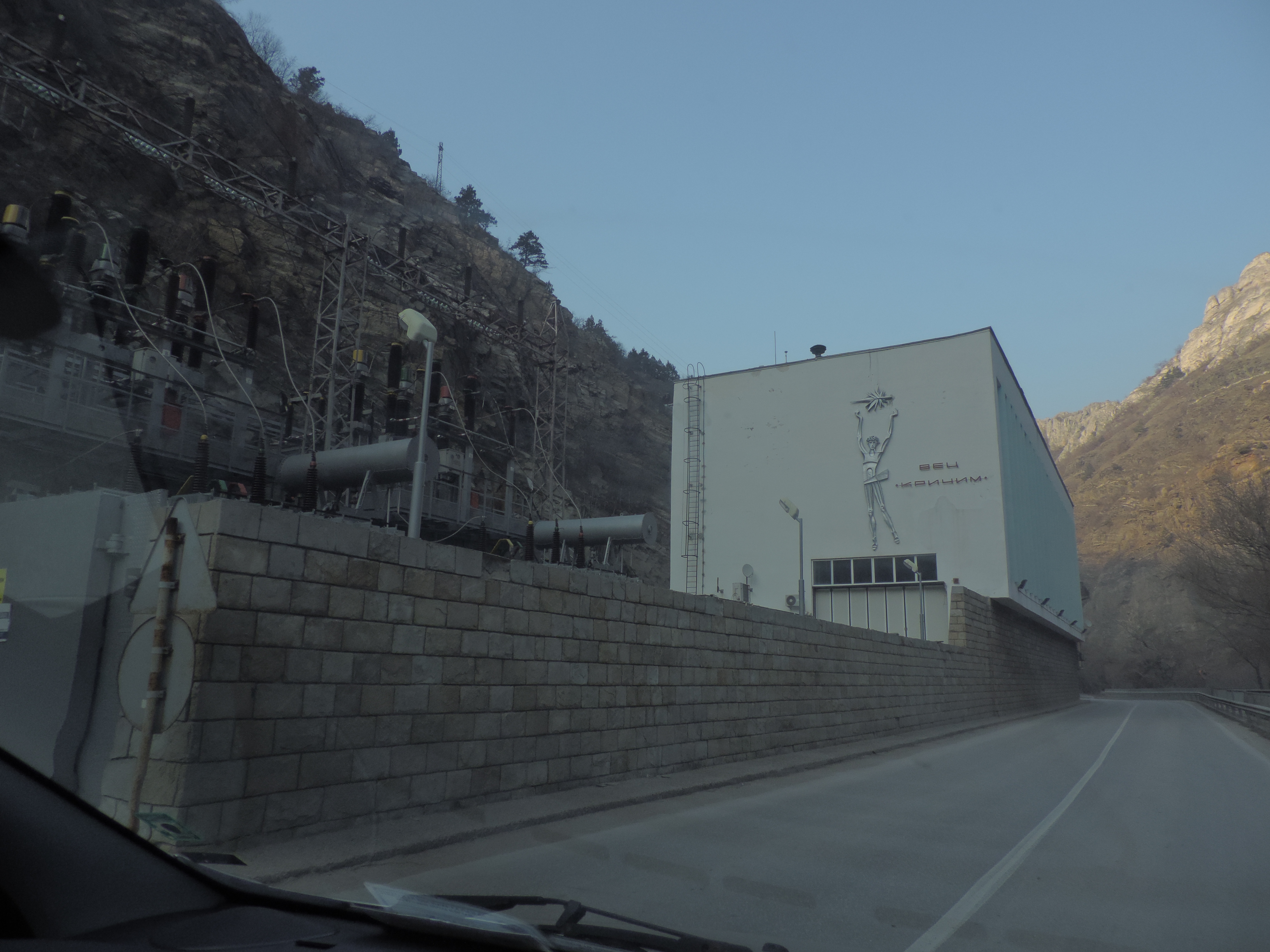
- Country: Bulgaria
- Location: Krichim
- Coordinates: 41°59′32″N 24°28′7″E
- Status: Operational
- Owner: NEK EAD
- Operator: NEK EAD

Thermal power station
- Primary fuel: Hydropower

Power generation
- Units operational: 4
- Nameplate capacity: 80 MW

The Krichim Hydro Power Plant (Bulgarian: Водноелектрическа централа "Кричим") is an active hydro power project in Krichim, Plovdiv Province, southern Bulgaria. It is situated downstream of the Krichim Reservoir along the river Vacha. It has 4 individual turbines with a nominal output of 20 MW which deliver up to 80 MW of power. It is part of the Dospat–Vacha Hydropower Cascade (500.2 MW).
