= Nikola Troyanov =

Nikola Troyanov (Bulgarian: Никола Троянов, known as pop Sokol ("pop falcon"), 1 January 1824 – 24 June 1876), was a Bulgarian revolutionary and Priest. His father, Apostol Troyanov, is a master from a carpenter family. After graduating from a monastery school, he was sent to the St. Bogoroditsa monastery near Krichim. Meetings of the revolutionary committee were held in his house. Troyanov was chairman of the steering committee. When the uprising broke out in Bratsigovo, he was at the forefront of the struggle. After the village was surrounded by the Turks and began to take it over, he surrendered in the hope that the Turks would have mercy on the villagers. He was brutally tortured and hanged in the city of Plovdiv.
