= Krichim Reservoir =

Reservoir in Bulgaria

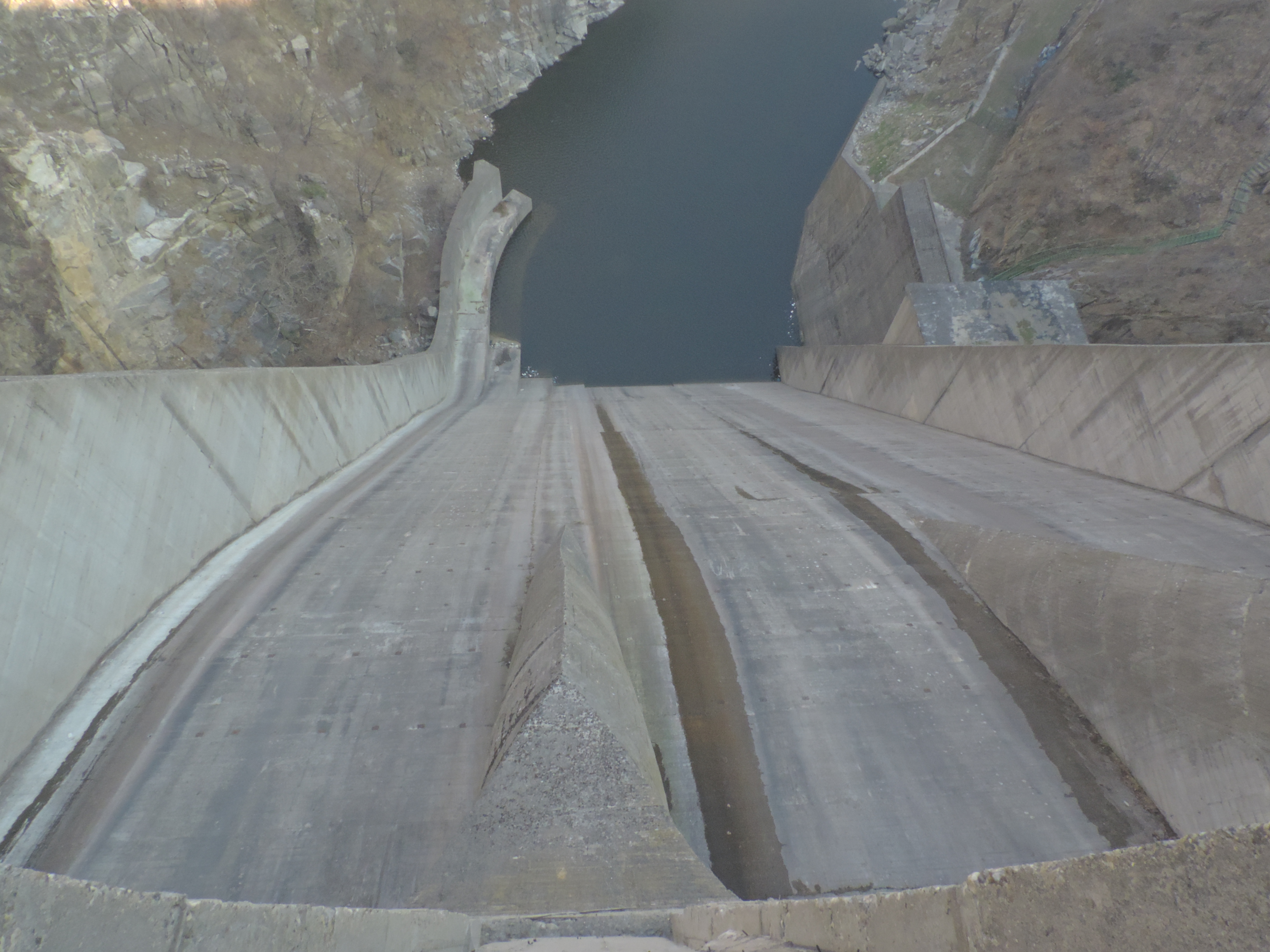
Top-down View of the Krichim dam

Krichim Dam (Язовир "Кричим") is a dam on the Vacha River, Bulgaria. It is part of the Dospat–Vacha Hydropower Cascade (500.2 MW) involving four more dams and seven power stations. The three existing dams on the Vacha River are the Vacha Dam, Tsankov Dam, and the Kamak Dam. The 144.5 metres (474 ft) concrete dam was in its implementation stage as of 2011.

The dam supports the 80 MW Krichim Hydro Power Plant.
