= Dospat–Vacha Hydropower Cascade =

- Locations of the Dospat–Vacha Hydropower Cascade power plants in Bulgaria
- Interactive map of Dospat–Vacha Hydropower Cascade
- Country: Bulgaria
- Location: Plovdiv Province, Smolyan Province
- Purpose: Hydroelectricity; Irrigation
- Status: Operational
- Construction began: 1963
- Owner: National Electricity Company
- Teshel HPP
- Interactive map of Teshel HPP
- Location: Teshel
- Status: Operational
- Opening date: 1972

Power Station
- Installed capacity: 60 MW
- Annual generation: 100 GWh
- Devin HPP
- Interactive map of Devin HPP
- Location: Devin
- Status: Operational
- Opening date: 1984

Power Station
- Installed capacity: 88 MW
- Annual generation: 145 GWh
- Tsankov Kamak HPP
- Interactive map of Tsankov Kamak HPP
- Location: Devin
- Status: Operational
- Opening date: 2010

Power Station
- Installed capacity: 86.4 MW
- Annual generation: 187 GWh
- Orphey HPP
- Interactive map of Orphey HPP
- Location: Krichim
- Status: Operational
- Opening date: 1975

Power Station
- Installed capacity: 164.8 MW
- Annual generation: 154 GWh
- Krichim HPP
- Interactive map of Krichim HPP
- Location: Krichim
- Status: Operational
- Opening date: 1973

Power Station
- Installed capacity: 80 MW
- Annual generation: 256 GWh
- Vacha 1 and 2 HPP
- Interactive map of Vacha 1 and 2 HPP
- Location: Krichim
- Status: Operational
- Opening date: 1933

Power Station
- Installed capacity: 21 MW
- Annual generation: 29 GWh

The Dospat–Vacha Hydroelectric Cascade (Bulgarian: Каскада "Доспат–Въча") is situated in the western Rhodope Mountains of southern Bulgaria, on the territory of the Smolyan, Pazardzhik and Plovdiv Provinces. It is owned by the National Electricity Company. The cascade was constructed between 1963 and 2010 by "Hydrostroy".

With catchment area of 2,083 km^{2} spanning from an altitude of 2,191 m at the summit of Golyam Perelik to 420 m at the Krichim Reservoir, it is among Bulgaria's most complex hydropower systems. The cascade receives water from several river drainages, mostly from the Mesta, the Dospat and the Vacha. It includes five reservoirs and seven hydro power plants — Teshel, Devin, Tsankov Kamak, Orphey, Krichim and Vacha 1 and 2, with a combined installed capacity of 500.2 MW, producing an average of 871 GWh annually.

== Structure ==
=== Dospat–Teshel junction ===
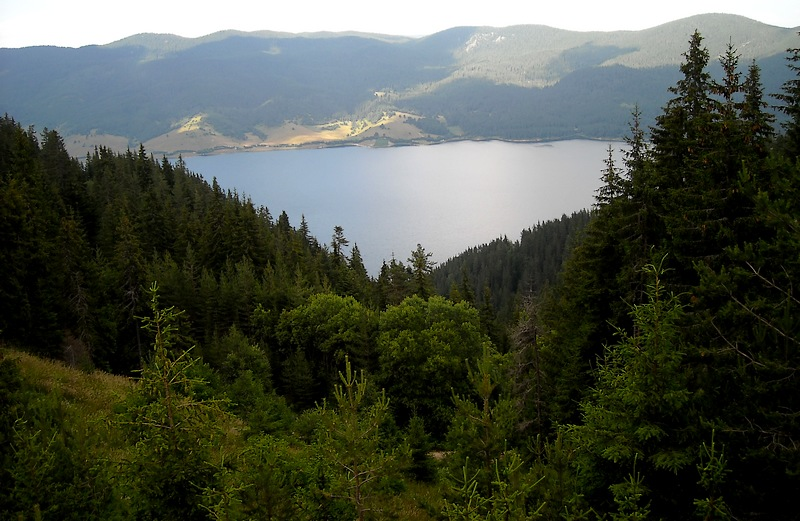
Dospat Reservoir

The Dospat–Teshel junction includes the Dospat Reservoir, the Teshel Hydro Power Plant and a system of derivations. The dam of the reservoir was constructed on the river Dospat in 1963–1969 on the territory of the towns of Dospat and Sarnitsa. With a territory of 22.1 km^{2} and a total volume of 449 million m^{3}, it is one of the largest in Bulgaria and serves as a multiannual leveler of the whole cascade. It has a stone dam with a clay core, reaching a height of 60.5 m and a length of 230 m, located at an altitude of 1,200.5 m.

Apart from the homonymous river, the Dospat Reservoir gathers water from three derivations — Vishteritsa–Kanina, which gathers water from several right tributaries of the Mesta, including the Vishteritsa and the Kanina at an altitude of 1,240 m; it has a length of 18 km and flows into Dospat upstream of the reservoir; the catchment area is 146 m^{2} and the maximum water discharge is 12.22 m^{3}/s; Bistritsa, which gathers water from the rivers Chechka Bistritsa and Velichka at an altitude of 1,205 m; it has a length of 9.8 km; the catchment area is 46 m^{2} and the maximum water discharge is 3.12 m^{3}/s; and finally Osina, which gathers water from the river Osina at an altitude of 1,210 m; it has a length of 12.2 km; the catchment area is 49 m^{2} and the maximum water discharge is 1.6 m^{3}/s.

The main pressure derivation of the Teshel HPP begins from a water tower behind the left side of the Dospat dam and continues with a 732 m overground pipeline, a 16 km pressure tunnel, a 110 m high underground water tower with an engine room chamber and ends with a 522 m long underground pipeline to power station. En route, it receives water from the derivations of Karadzha dere (catchment area of 39 m^{2}; water discharge of 7.75 m^{3}/s) and Beldonovo dere (catchment area of 26 m^{2}; water discharge of 1.5 m^{3}/s).

Teshel HPP itself is located on the territory of the village of Borino. It has two Francis turbines with a total installed capacity of 60 MW and was put into operation in 1972. Its utilized water from flows directly into its lower equalizer, which forms part of the second level of the cascade.

=== Teshel junction ===
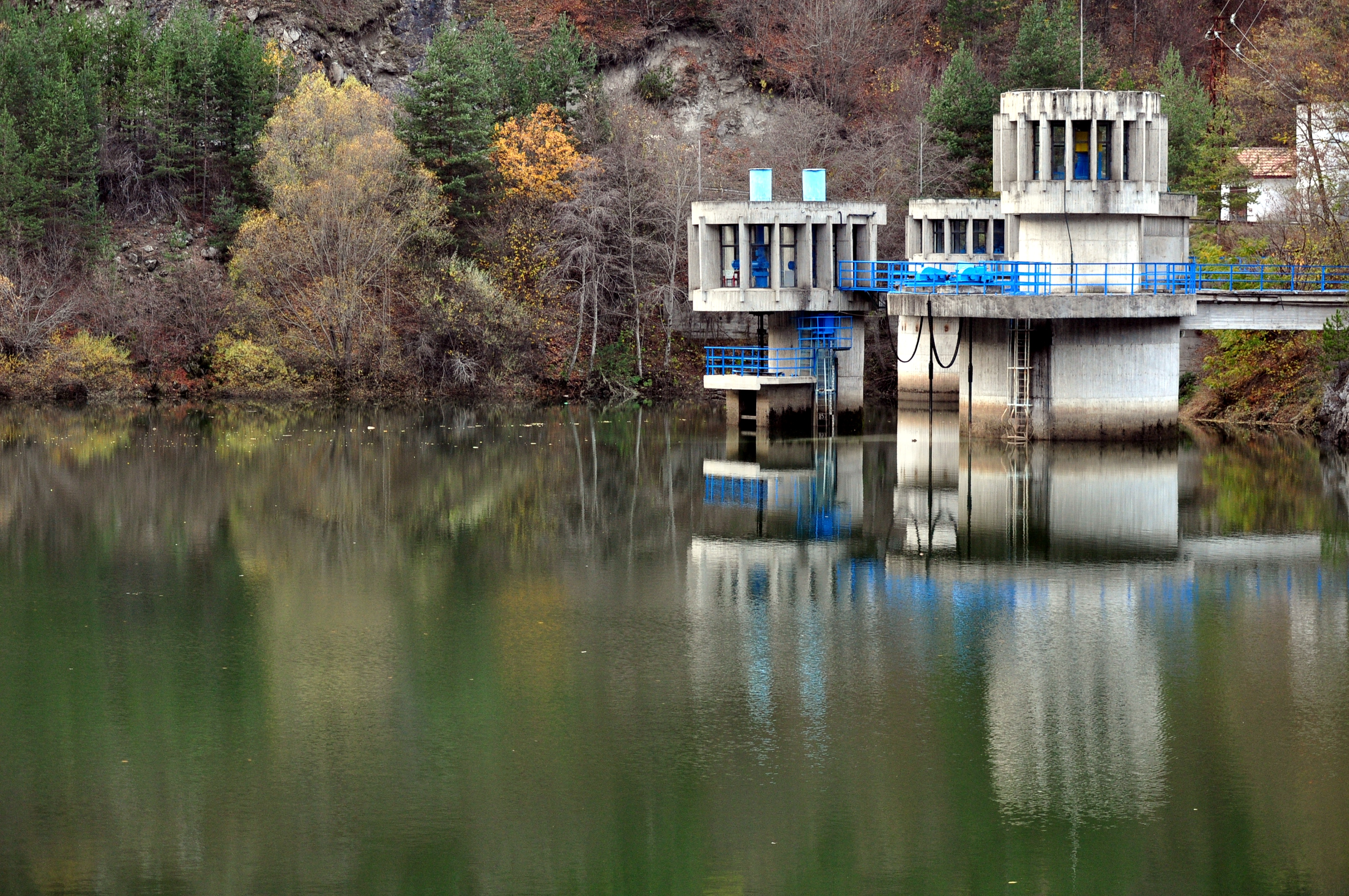
Teshel Reservoir

The main facilities of the Teshel junction are the Teshel Reservoir, the Devin Hydro Power Plant. The reservoir is located on the territory of the village of Borino and Yagodina upstream of the village of Teshel. It was inaugurated in 1984 and serves as a daily equalizer. Apart from the waters of the Teshel HPP, it receives inflow from Vacha’s main stem the Buynovska reka via a derivation with a capacity of 6 m^{3}/s. The dam is 30 m high and 200 m long and forms a lake with an area of 0.1 km^{2} and a volume of 1.4 million m^{3}.

The water of the reservoir is directed to the main pressure derivation of the Devin HPP, which also receives inflow from the rivers Trigradska reka (3.7 m^{3}/s) and Muglenska reka (3.3 m^{3}/s) through a 970 m tunnel. The derivation itself includes a 27.4 m high water tower in the dam, a 145 m tunnel, a 335 m open pressure pipeline, an 8.5 km pressure tunnel, a 51 m high open top underground water tower and a 356 m underground pressure pipeline leading the power plant.

The power plant is located close to the town of Devin. It is an above-ground derivation powerplant, with two Francis turbines with a total installed capacity of 80 MW initially, later increased to 88 MW. It was inaugurated in 1984.

=== Tsankov Kamak junction ===
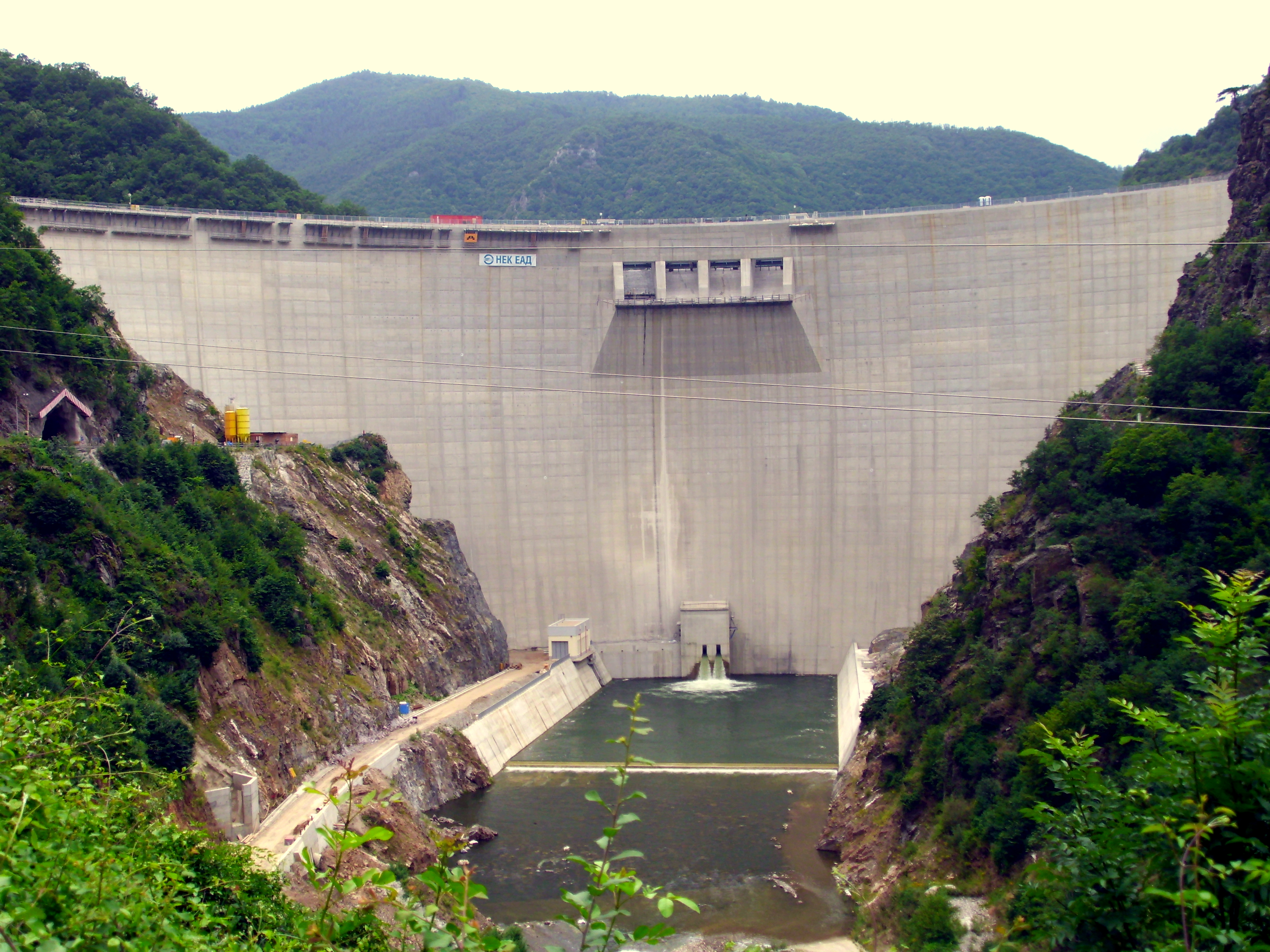
Tsankov Kamak Dam

The water from the Devin TPP flows through the Vacha riverbed until the Tsankov Kamak Reservoir, where the Vacha receives its left tributaries the Devinska reka and the Gashnya. Constructed in 2010, Tsankov Kamak has a double curvature arch dam, the first on Bulgaria of this type, reaching a height of 130.5 m and a length of 486 m. It forms a lake with an area of 3.3 km^{2} and a volume of 110.9 million m^{3}.

The homonymous HPP is powered by a water quantity of 69.5 m^{3}/s. It has two Francis turbines with a total installed capacity of 86.4 MW and a projected annual production of 198 GWh. It is fed with waters from the reservoir from an open intake in its arm in the former bed of the Gashnya river, from where they are directed through a 600 m underground pressure steel pipeline. During the construction of the plant, a correction was made to the bed of the Vacha river below it, which further increased the water fall by 10 meters.

=== Vacha junction ===
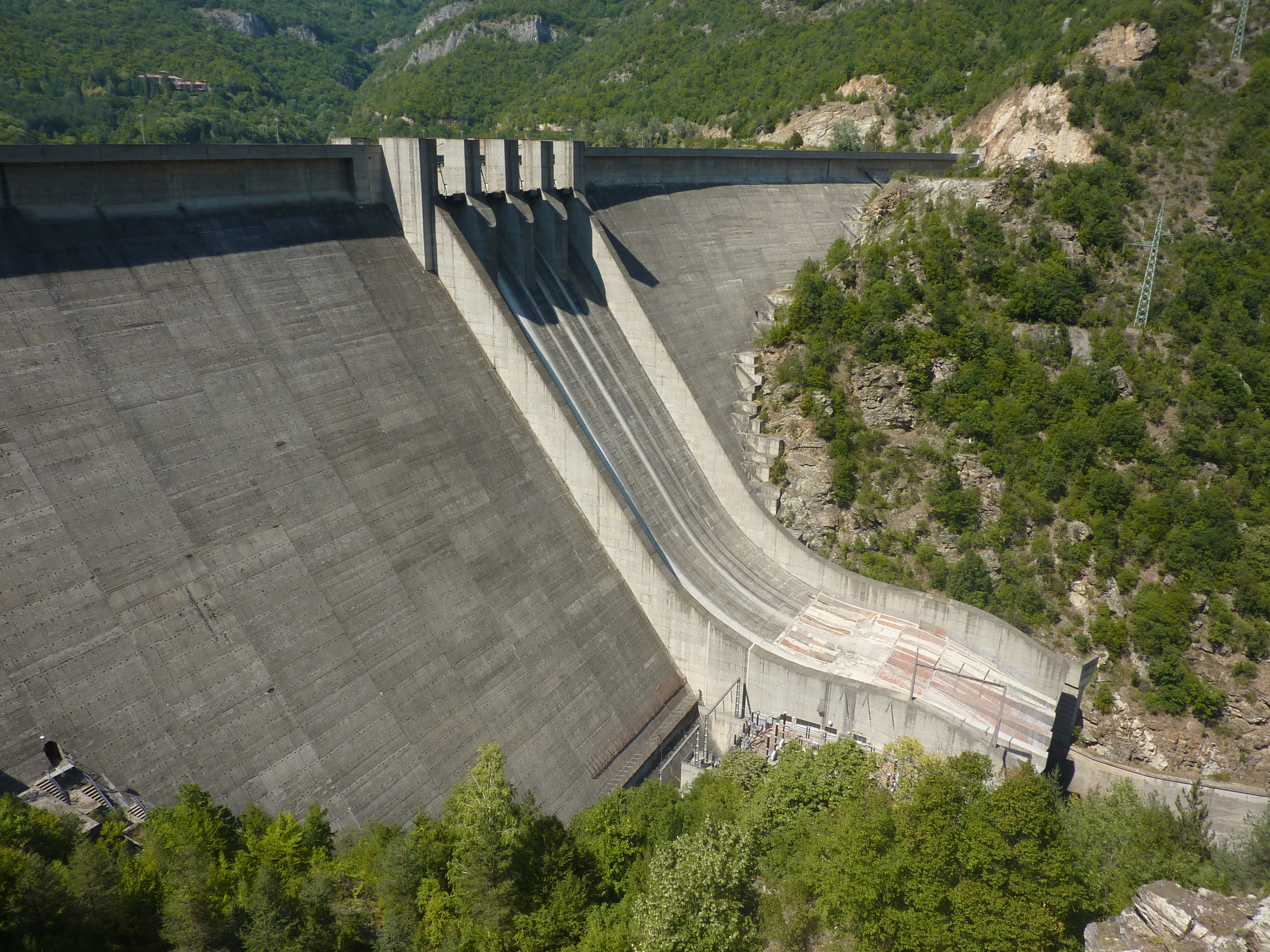
Vacha Dam

The water from the Tsankov Kamak HPP flows through the river bed the Vacha Reservoir, which is an annual leveler. It spans a territory of 5 km^{2} and contains 226.2 million m^{3} of water. Its dam is the highest in Bulgaria, reaching 144.5 m, and is a concrete gravity structure. Its length is 420 m.

Within the dam wall is constructed the Orphey Pumped Storage Hydro Power Plant, equipped with four Francis turbines with a combined installed capacity of 160 MW. The average water fall is 112 m and the maximum water discharge is 168 m^{3}/s. The water processed by the Orphey HPP enters the bed of the Vacha river, which in an 840 m section of length has been corrected with a reverse slope, so that the pumping unit of the power plant may use water returned from the Krichim Reservoir downstream.

=== Krichim junction ===
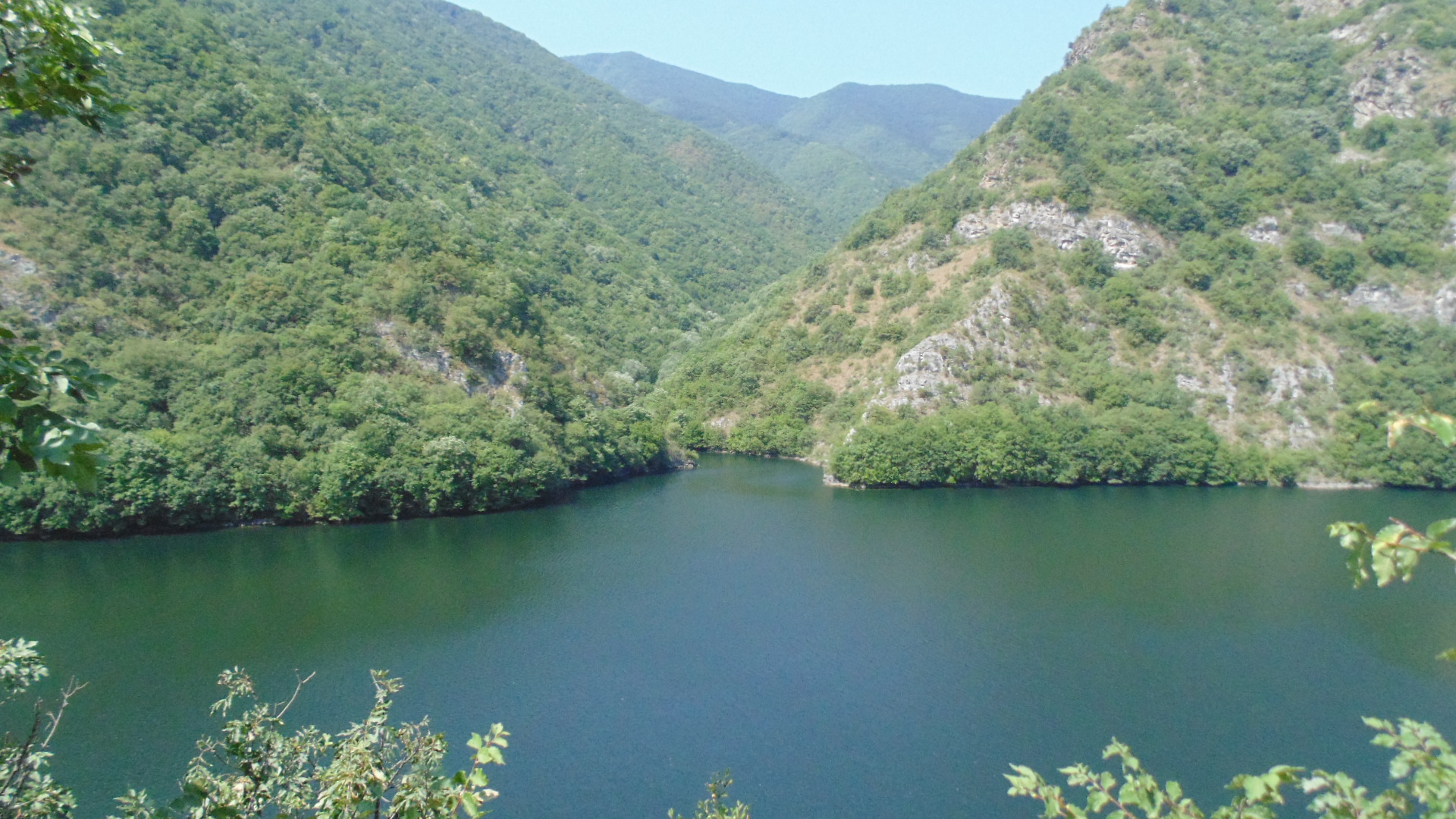
Krichim Reservoir

The Krichim junction is the lowest and final part of the cascade and consists of the Krichim Reservoir and three hydro power plants.

The reservoir receives water from the dams upstream, as well as from the derivation of Churenska reka from the neighbouring Parvenetska reka drainage. Its dam was constructed in 1963–1972 in concrete and has a height of 104.5 m and a length of 270 m. It forms a lake with an area of 0.8 km^{2} and a volume of 20.3 million m^{3} that winds for 4 km along the narrow canyon-like valley of the Vacha river.

Its waters are diverted via two separate routes — one to the Krichim Hydro Power Plant and another to the Vacha 1 and 2 Hydro Power Plants. The main output flows through the former and are later discharged to an irrigation system in the Upper Thracian Plain that also uses water from the Batak Hydropower Cascade to the west. The water from the second route was also intended to be utilized for irrigation but the required irrigation system was never built and is currently viable only during high water.

The Krichim HPP was commissioned in 1973 and is linked to the reservoir through a derivation which begins from a water tower, passes through a 3.8 km pressure tunnel with a 4.4 m diameter to an open underground water tower with a height of 50 m, and from there it is fed to the engine room of the power plant via a pressure pipeline. It has two Francis turbines with a total installed capacity of 80 MW. The average water fall is 162 m and the maximum water discharge capacity is 60 m^{3}/s.

The Vacha 2 HPP was put into operation in 1972 to utilize the fall between the then-newly built Krichim Reservoir upstream and the old equalizer reservoir of the Vacha 1 HPP downstream. It is located between the two reservoirs, in the territory of the village of Zhrebichko. There are two Francis turbines with a combined installed power capacity of 7 MW, an average fall of 82 m and a capacity of 9.2 m^{3}/s. The water supply from the Krichim Reservoir is via an underground pressure pipeline with a length of 420 m.

The Vacha 1 HPP and its upper equalizer reservoir are the oldest part of the cascade, constructed during the Interwar period by the Vacha Water Union. It was commission in 1933 with two turbine units, with another two added in 1949. It is powered by water from the Vacha 2 HPP supplied via a derivation, which begins from the equalizer and flows through a 4.8 km pressure tunnel and a 196 m long above-ground steel pressure pipeline. The Vacha 1 HPP has four Francis turbines with a total installed capacity of 15.4 MW, an average fall of 83 m and a capacity of 20 m^{3}/s.

== See also ==
- Energy in Bulgaria
- Hydroelectricity in Bulgaria
- Batak Hydropower Cascade
- Geography of Bulgaria
- Rhodope Mountains
