= Tsankov Kamak Dam =

Dam in Bulgaria

- Interactive map of Tsankov Kamak Dam

Tsankov Dam is a dam on the Vacha River, Bulgaria. It is part of the Vacha Cascade Joint Implementation Project involving three more dams and four power stations. The two other existing dams on the Vacha River are the Vacha Dam and the Kamak Dam.
