= Vacha Reservoir =

Reservoir in Devin Municipality, Bulgaria

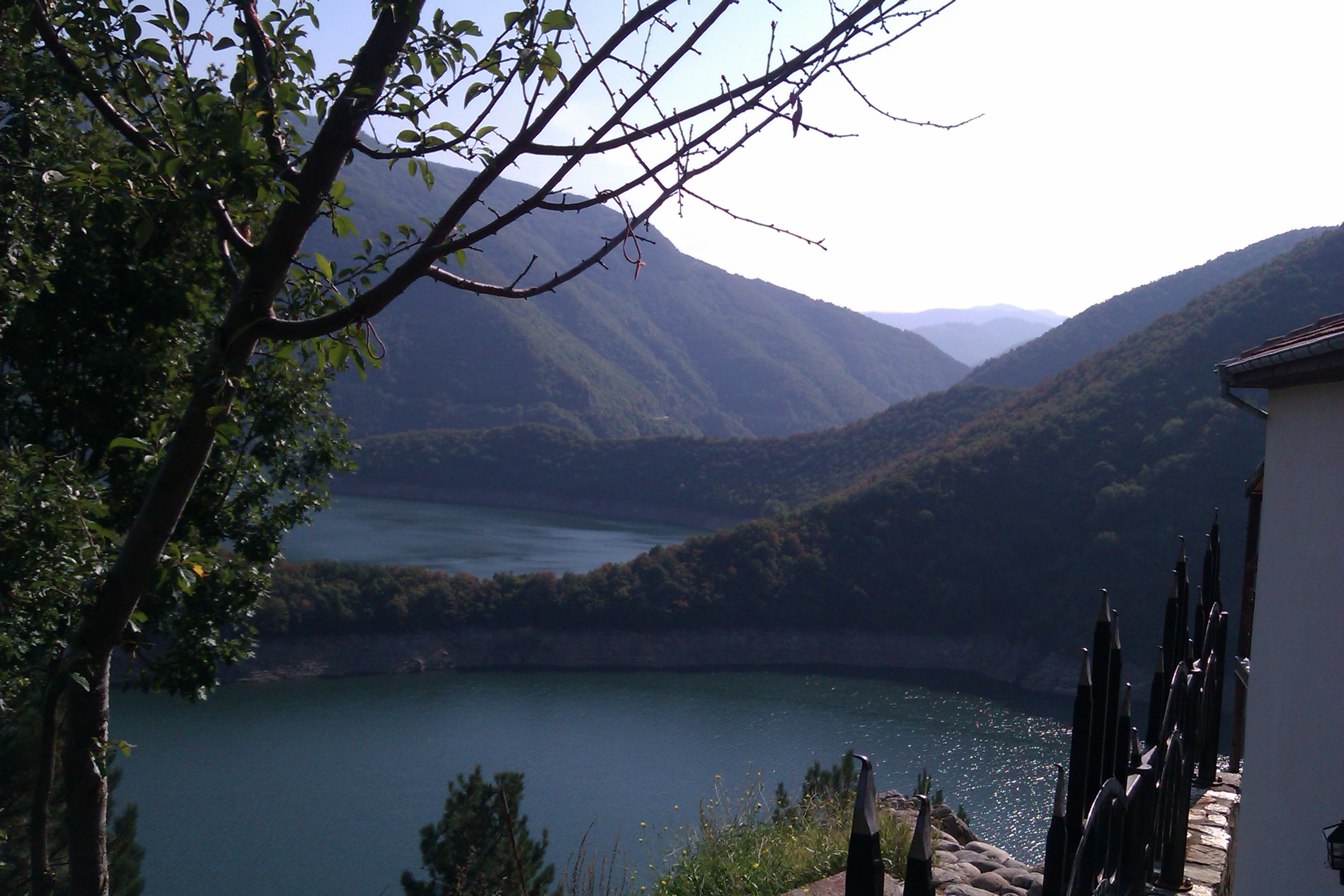

- Location within Bulgaria
- Location: Devin Municipality
- Coordinates: 41.9319°N 24.4383°E
- Type: reservoir
- Primary inflows: Vacha River
- Primary outflows: Vacha River
- Basin countries: Bulgaria
- Max. length: 35 km (22 mi)
- Max. depth: 160 m (520 ft)
- Water volume: 226 million m³ (6.0×10^{10} US gal)
- Surface elevation: 680 metres (2,230 ft)

Vacha Reservoir (Bulgarian: Въча язовир Yazovir Vacha; before 1999: Antonivanovtsi Reservoir) is a body of water associated with a dam in Devin Municipality, south Bulgaria. It is part of the Dospat–Vacha Hydropower Cascade (500.2 MW) involving four more dams and seven power stations. The three other existing dams on the Vacha River are the Krichim Dam, the Tsankov Kamak Dam and the Teshel Dam.

Completed on 5 November 1975, the Vacha Dam is situated 680 metres (2,230 ft) above sea level. The dam was designed by Bulgarian hydroengineers, though their work was overseen by Russian, Japanese and Italian experts. It is a concrete gravity structure of 144.5 metres (474 ft) height, making it the tallest dam in Bulgaria together with Krichim Dam. Its pumped storage power plant has a capacity of 160 MW.

== History ==
The potential of hydroelectric projects on the Vacha River in southern Bulgaria was recognized by the Bulgarian government at least as early as the early 1960s. The June 1962 edition of Water Power stated that the dam was "scheduled to add 436 MW to the Bulgarian system by the end of 1965." In 1964, Energy International reported that dam construction on the river was underway. It appears that development of the dam took longer than expected, eventually completed in 1975.

As the dam was designed for a maximum seismic design acceleration of 0.05 g according to the regulations apparent in Bulgaria in 1964, it was considered appropriate to study the safety of the dam structure by two dimensional finite element method under revised seismic norms prescribed in 1984, namely for two levels, the “Design Earthquake (DE)” and Maximum Credible Earthquake (MCE), taking due note of the interaction between the foundation soil and the structure and the non-linear behaviour of concrete. The seismic accelerations considered in the analysis were 0.32 g, 0.5 g and 1.1 g. The analysis concluded that the dam is safe under the seismic considerations except that partial damage could occur under the maximum seismic design factor but the dam would not fail.

In February 2012, Bulgarian Minister of Economy and Energy, Traycho Traykov started an inspection of dams in the country, amongst them Vacha and Krichim dams and the Orpheus Water Power Plant. The inspection was initiated by reports that dams in the region had been overflowing and were hazardous, and engineers in the country warned that the problem would worsen due to snow melt and cause potential flooding.

== Geography ==
The Vacha Dam Reservoir has been created as a part of cascade development on the Vacha River in southern Bulgaria. Vacha River, one of the main right tributaries of the Maritsa, is the second longest river that has its source in the Rhodopes, the Arda being the longest. It is 105 kilometres (65 mi) long and is formed by the confluence of the rivers Chairdere and Buynovska. The Vacha runs through the Rhodopes forming a deep valley where the two dams, the Krichim and Vacha, are located.

The reservoir lies 40 km (25 mi) from Plovdiv, one of Bulgaria's major cities, and a potential breach in the dam walls would gravely endanger the city. In the direct vicinity of the reservoir is the town of Krichim.

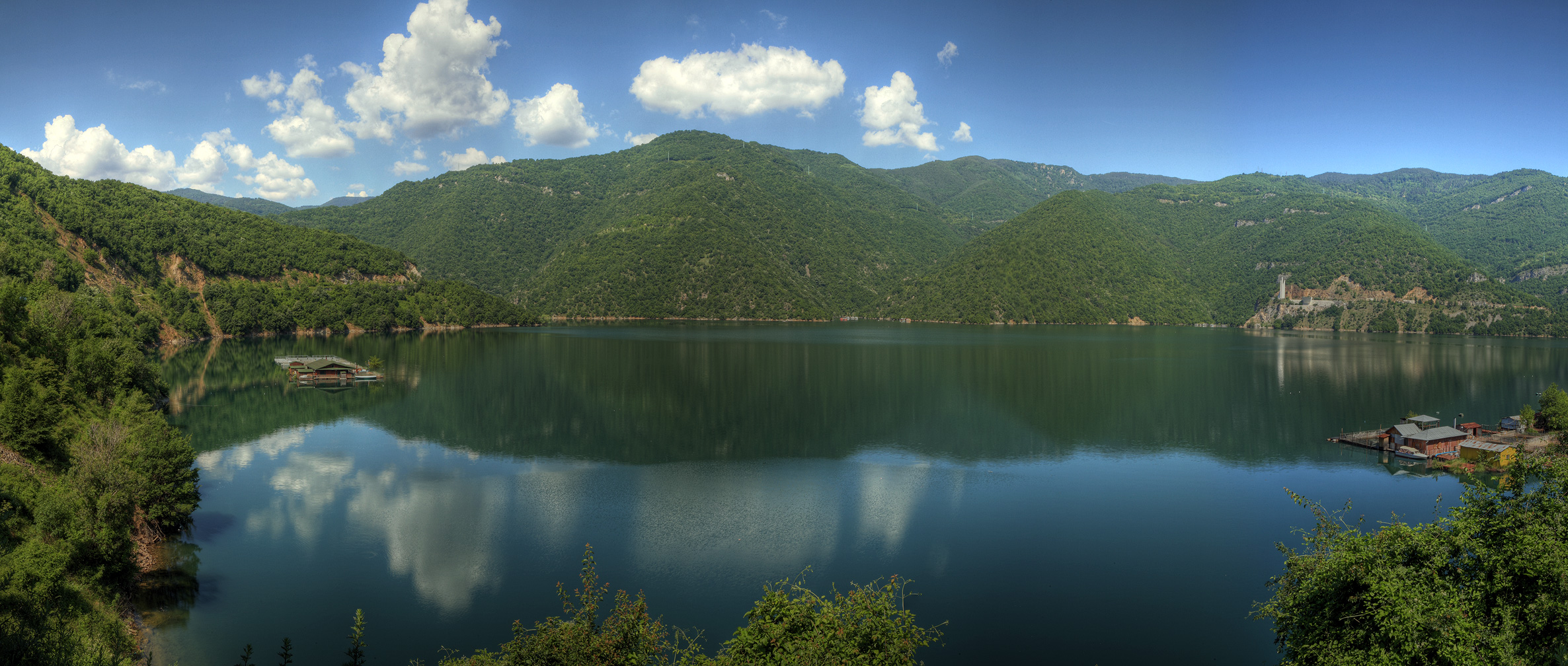
Vacha reservoir

== Features ==
The Vacha Dam is 144.5 metres (474 ft) in height and has a water spread which stretches 30 kilometres (19 mi) upstream. The dam is hemmed between the Krichin Reservoir on the upstream and the Devan HPP and is part of the Dospad-Vacha cascade development involving six dams. The construction of this highest concreted masonry dam in Bulgaria was started in the 1960s and completed in 1975. The benefits derived from the project cover power generation of 160 MW, irrigation, reservoir fisheries and drinking water supply to part of Plovdiv Province. There is a monument to the members of the World War II anti-fascist Anton Ivanov Rhodope Partisan Detachment in the area.

=== Reservoir ===
The reservoir created by the Vacha Dam stretches upstream over a length of 20 kilometres (12 mi). Physicochemical analysis of the reservoir water has been carried out during 2008 and 2009 to determine the diversity, distribution and quantitative development of phytoplankton, and to primarily evaluate the presence of cyanotoxins from the point of view of reservoir water usage as a safe drinking water source. The study indicated that the level of cyanotoxin in the reservoir was within limits. Continued monitoring of the level of cyanoprokaryota and their toxins was considered essential in all reservoirs for risk assessment of the water for contamination.

The Vacha reservoir has been stocked with catfish, carp and other fish species popular among fishermen. The locals tell a legend of a human-sized catfish called The Golden One who inhabits the depths of the dam and whose scales flicker in warm and still weather.

As of 2003, there are three houseboats permanently moored in the reservoir.

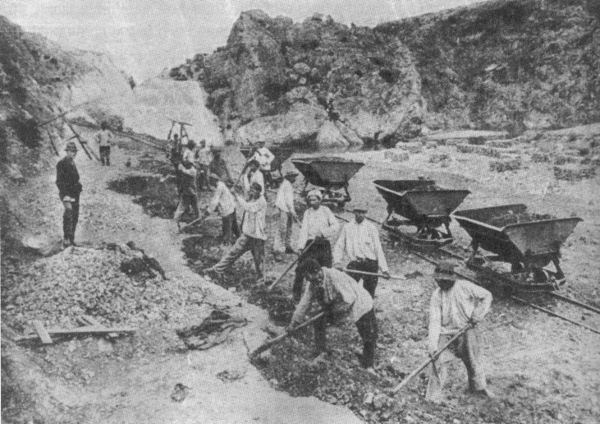

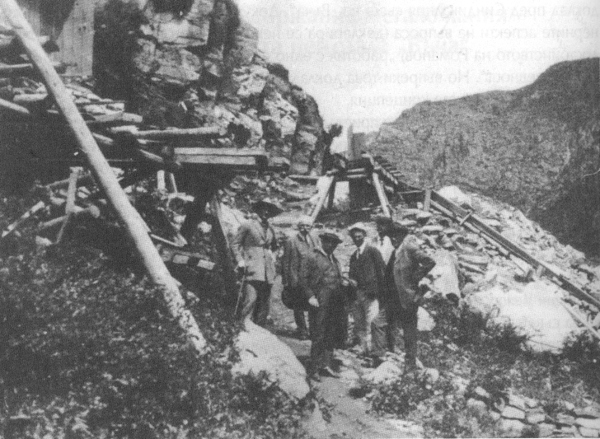

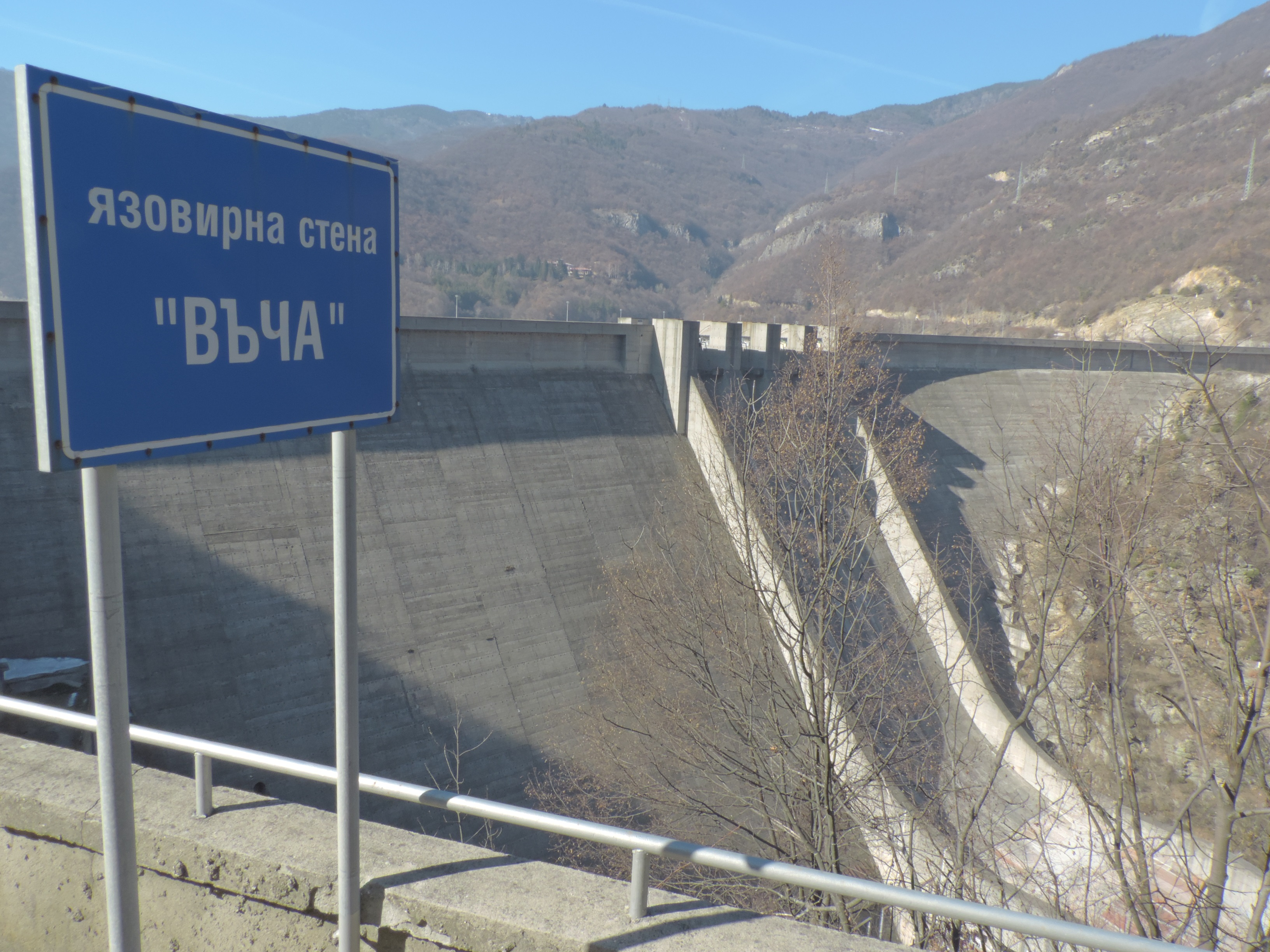
The reservoir wall

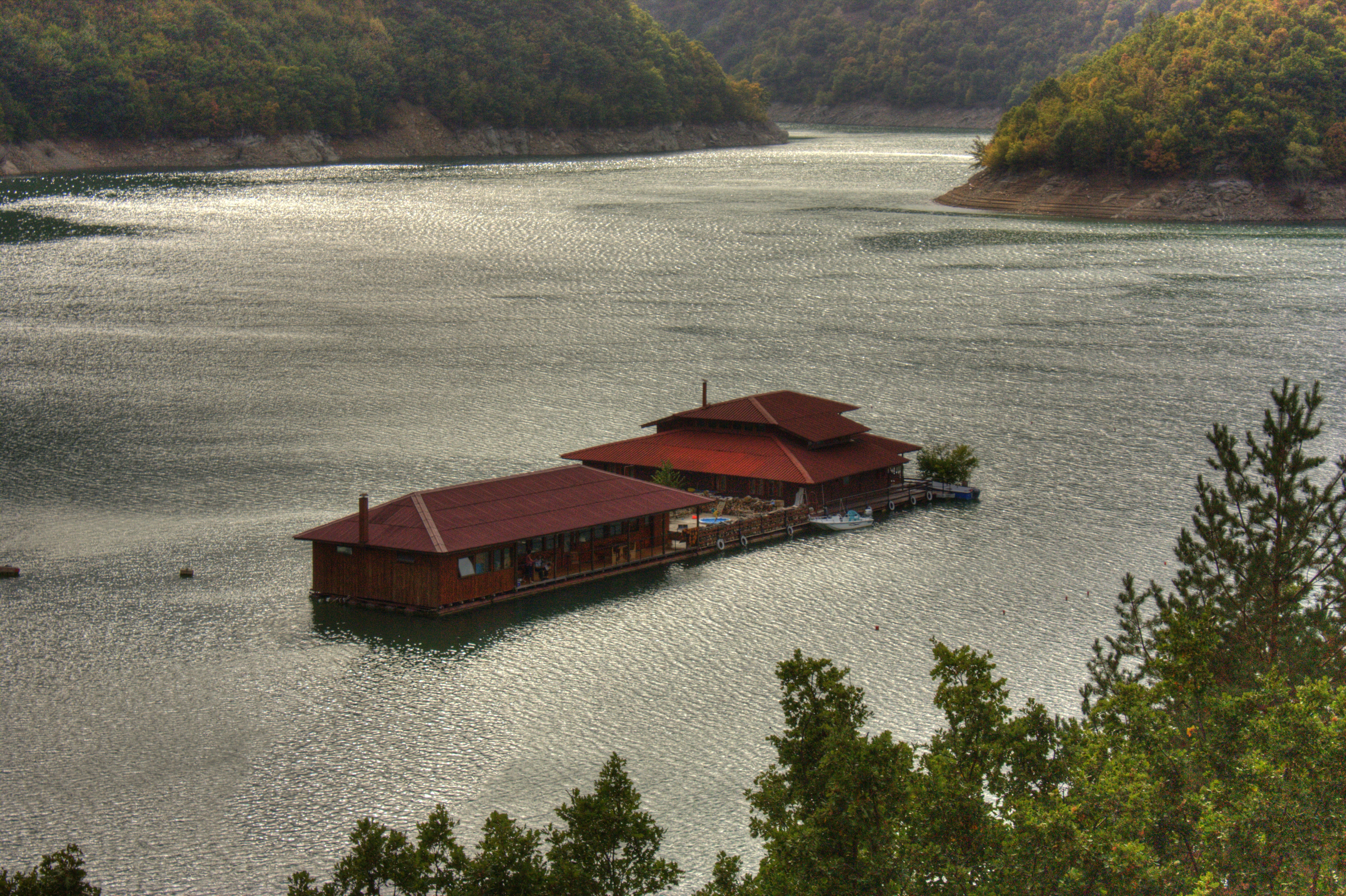

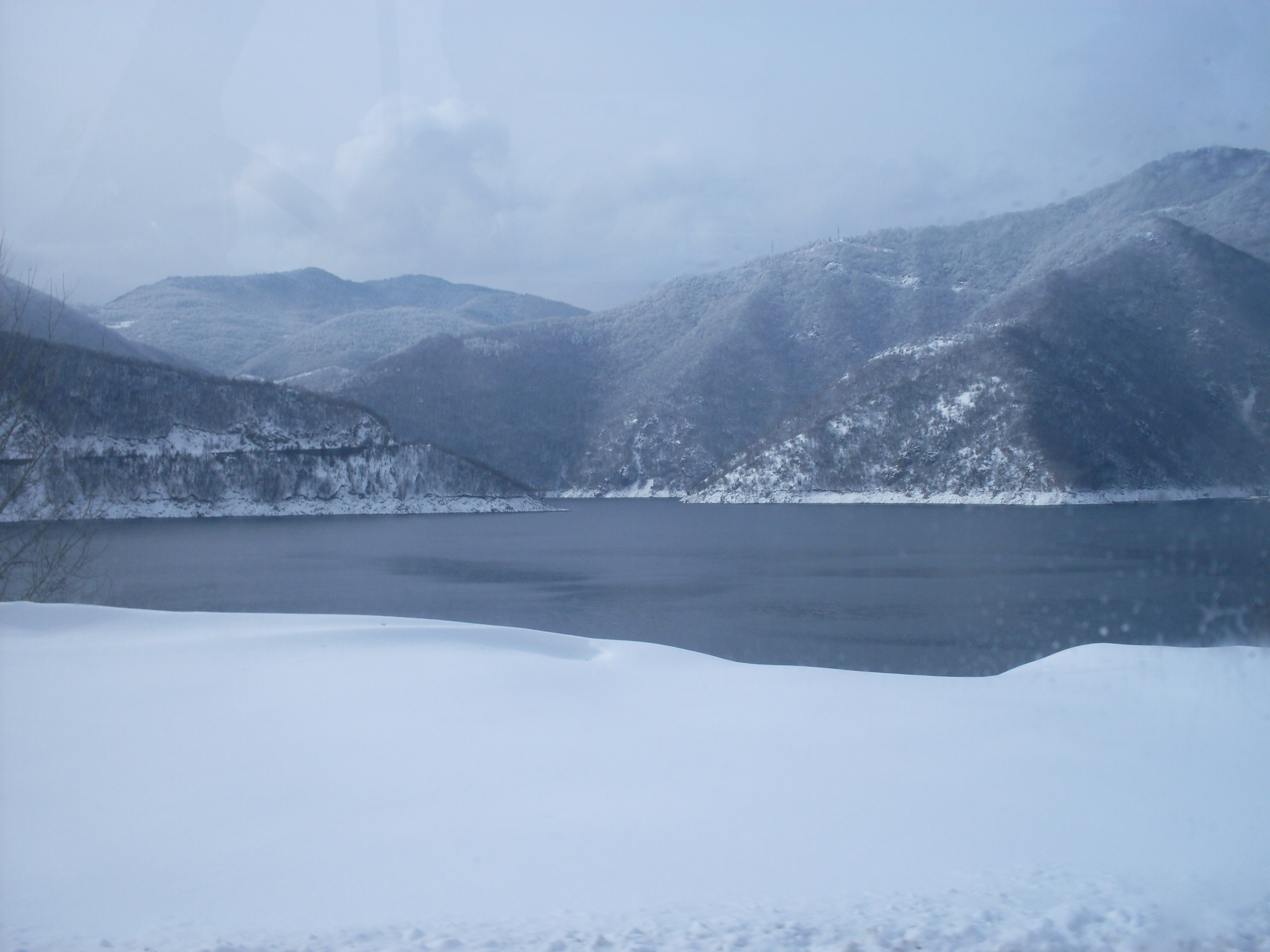

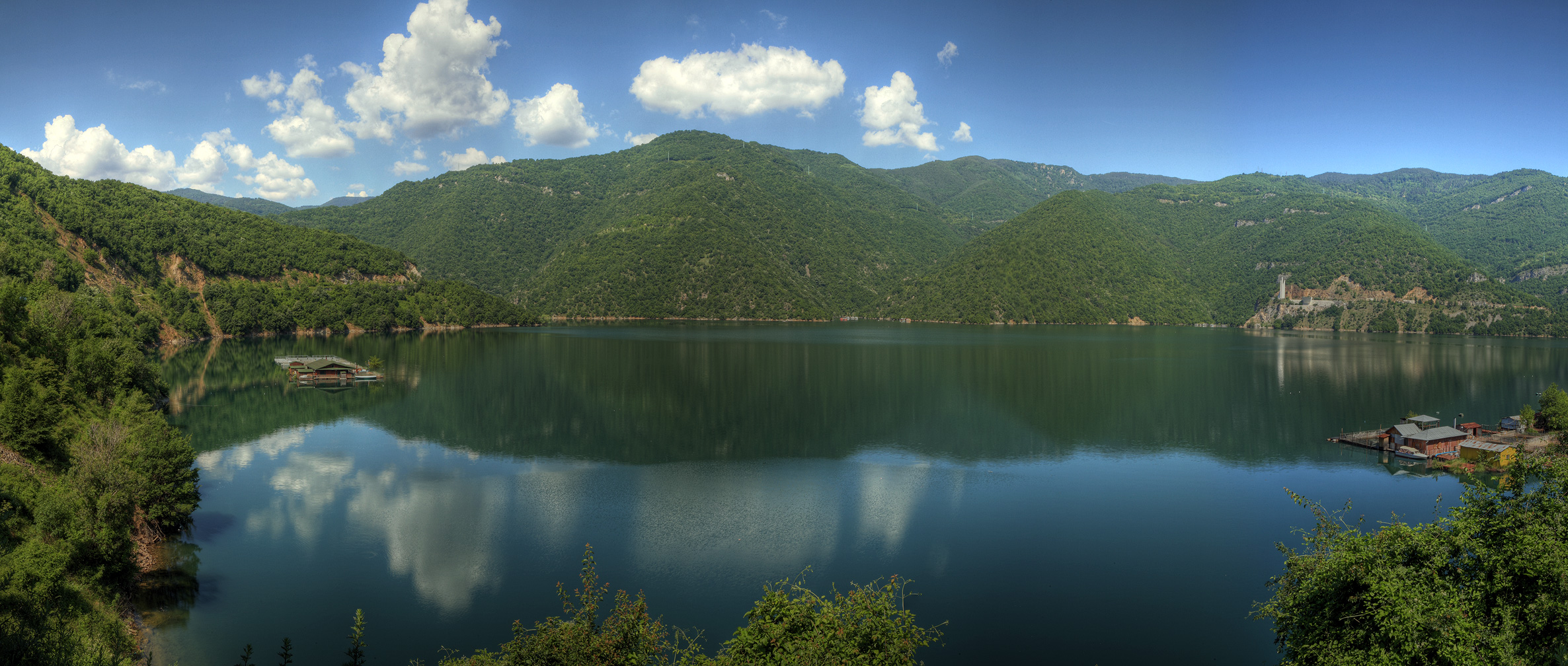

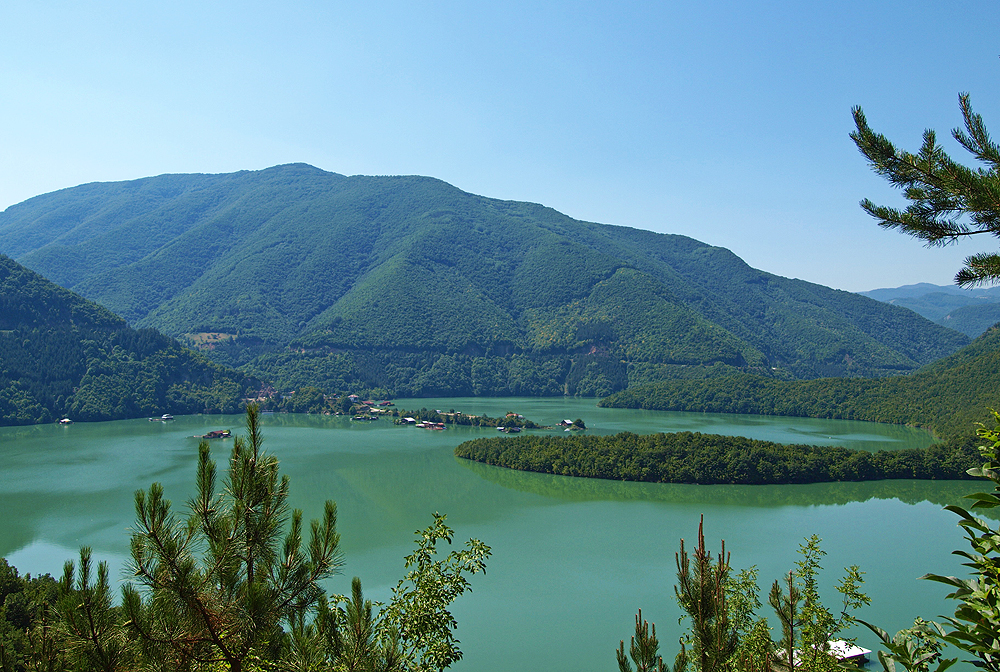

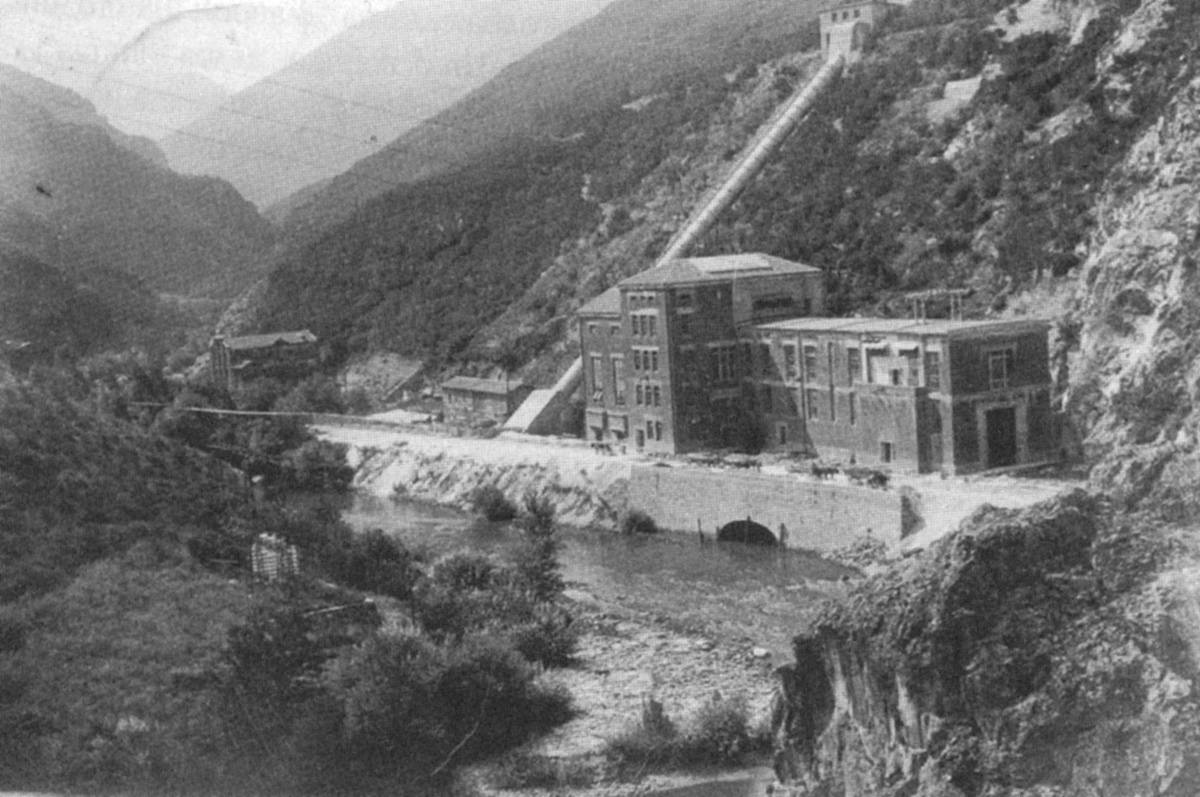

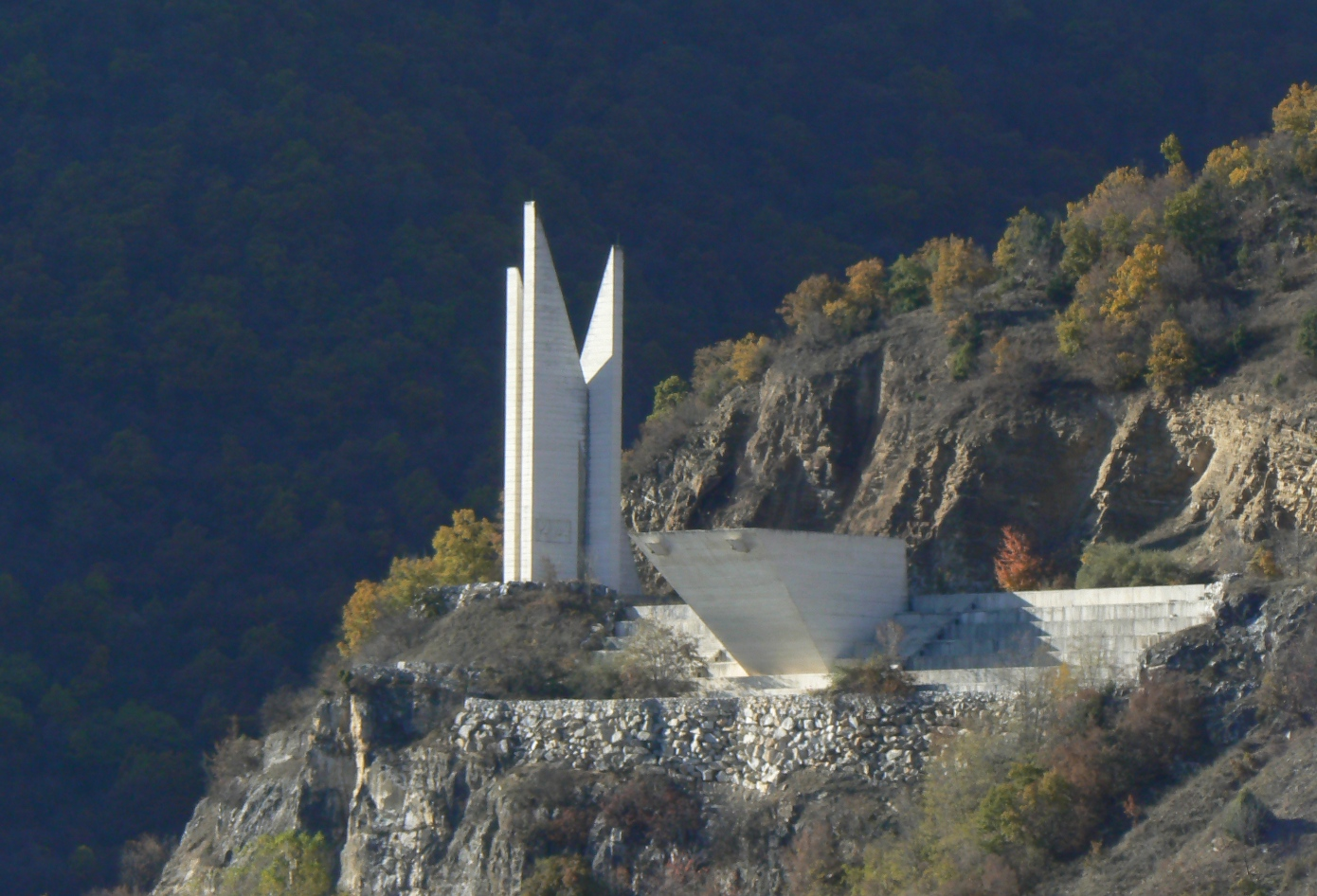
Monument to the Anton Ivanov Rhodope Partisan Detachment

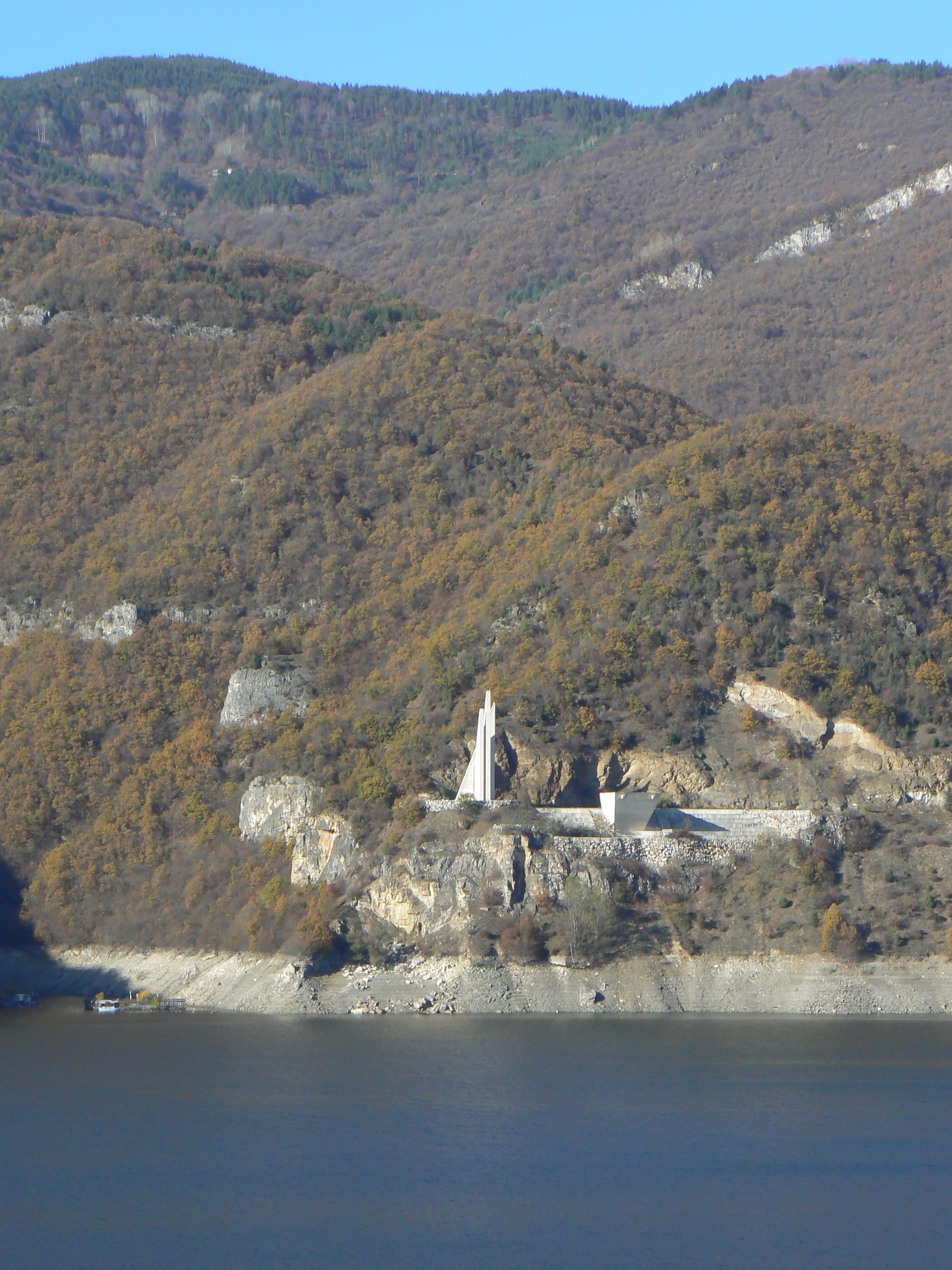

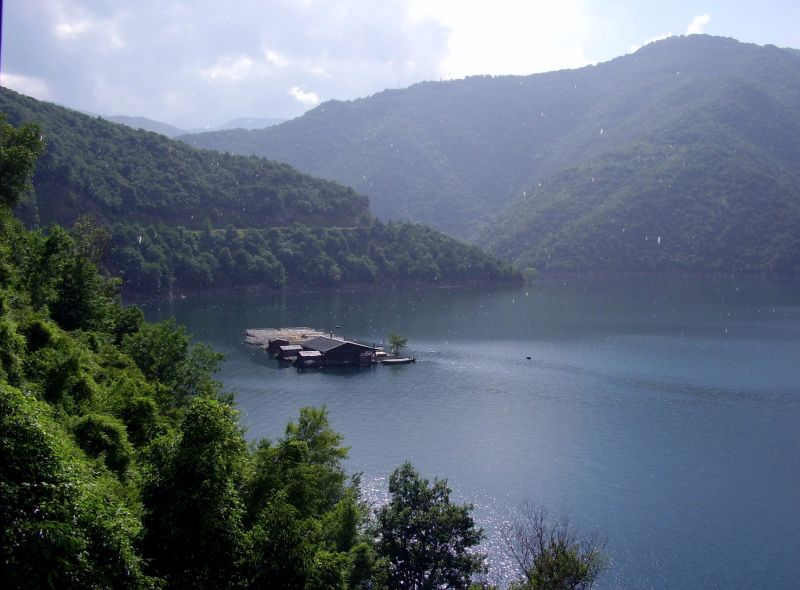

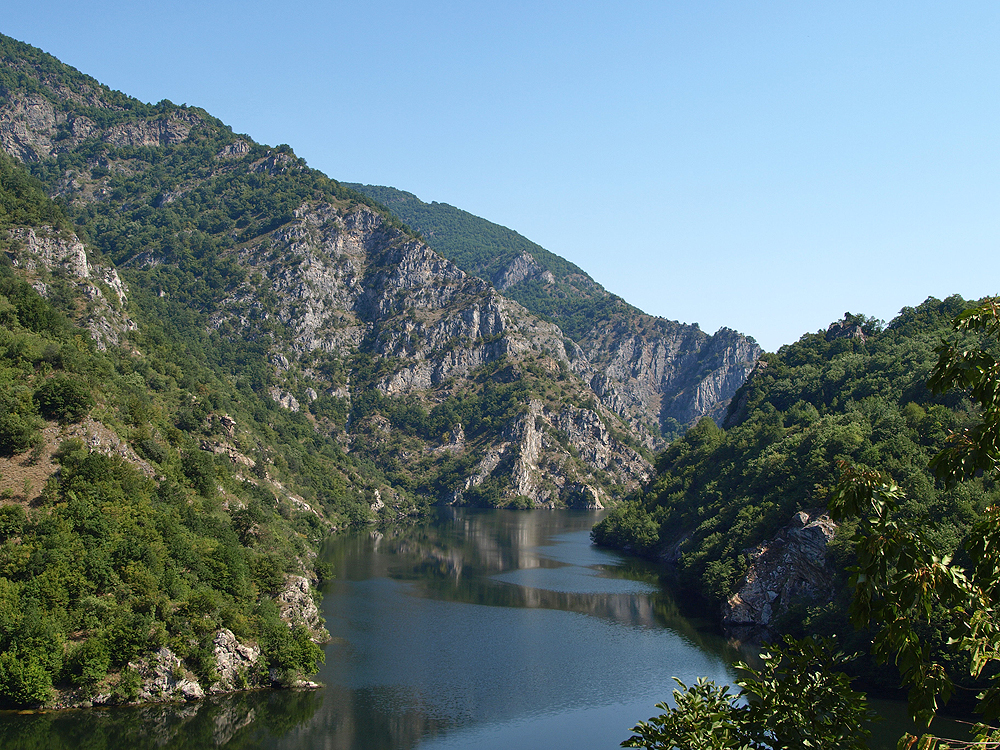
