= Devin Hydro Power Plant =

Hydroelectric power plant in Devin, Smolyan, Bulgaria

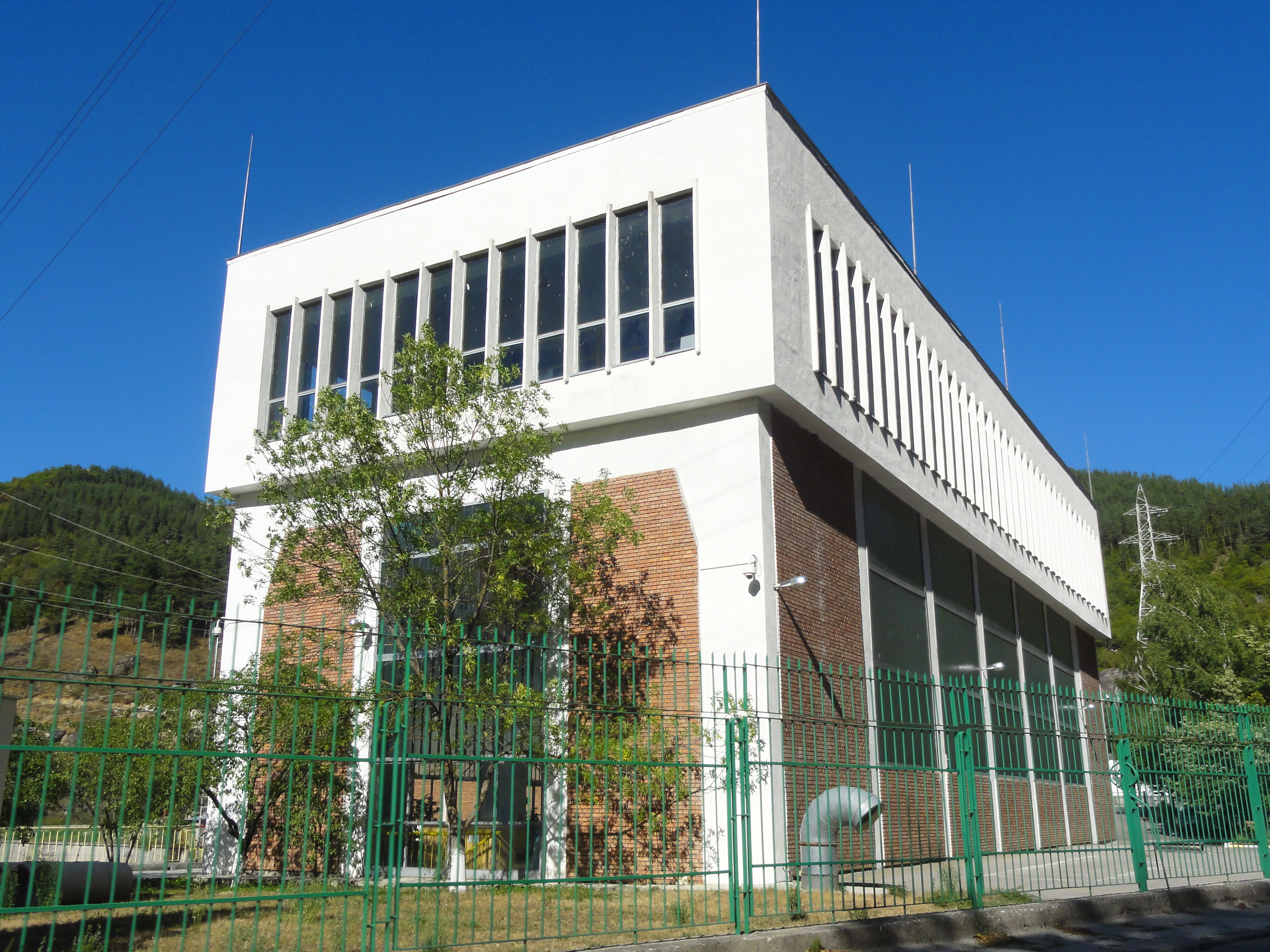
- Country: Bulgaria
- Location: Devin
- Coordinates: 41°43′13″N 24°25′30″E
- Status: Operational
- Commission date: 1984
- Owner: NEK EAD
- Operator: NEK EAD

Thermal power station
- Primary fuel: Hydropower

Power generation
- Units operational: 4
- Nameplate capacity: 88 MW

External links
- Commons: Related media on Commons

The Devin Hydro Power Plant (Bulgarian: Водноелектрическа централа "Девин") is an active hydro power project in Devin, Smolyan Province, southern Bulgaria. Situated along the river Vacha in the Rhodope Mountains, it has 2 individual turbines with a nominal output of 44 MW which deliver up to 88 MW of power. It is part of the Dospat–Vacha Hydropower Cascade (500.2 MW).
