= Teshel Hydro Power Plant =

Hydroelectric power plant in Bulgaria

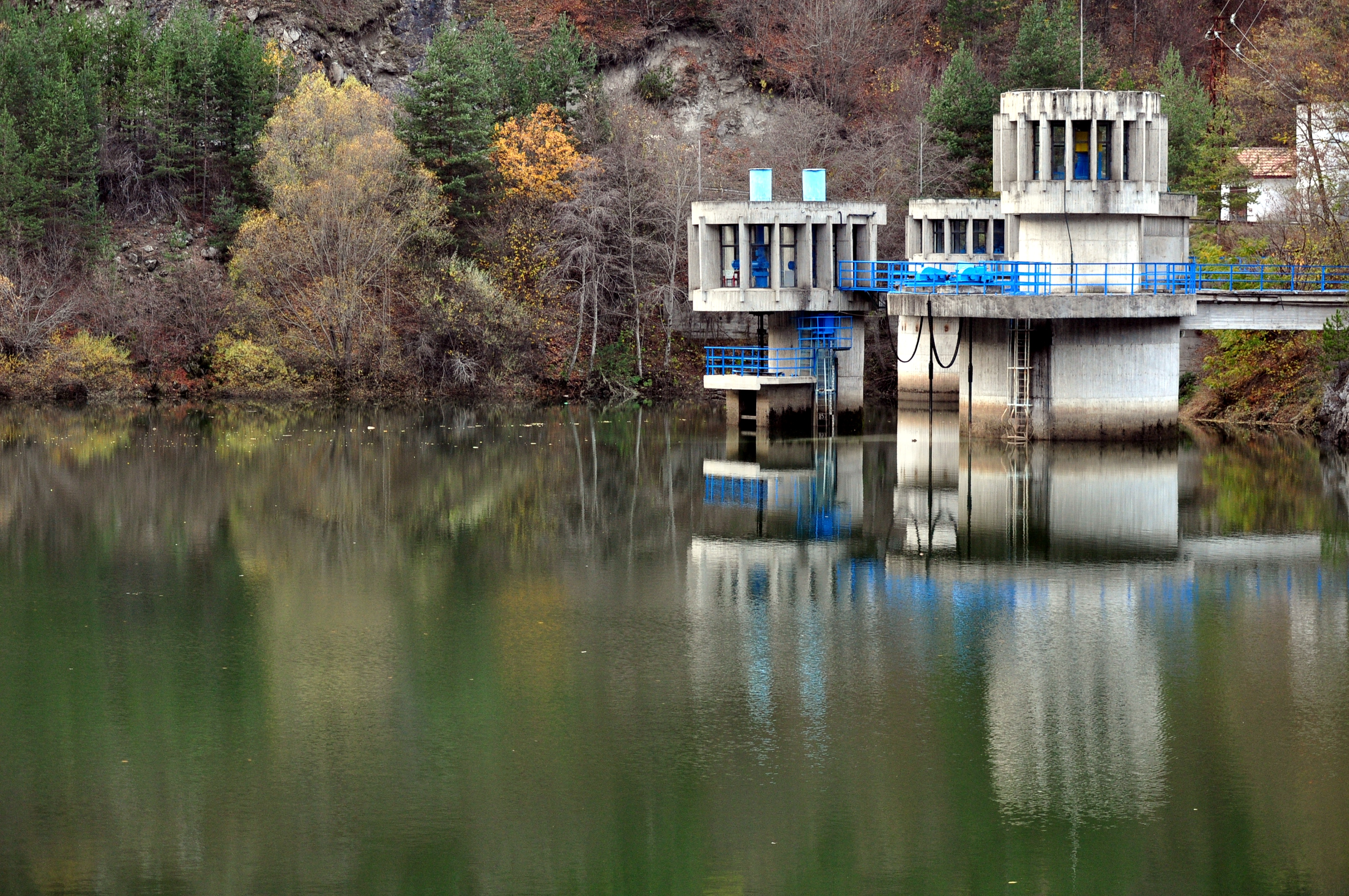
- Контролната кула на язовир „Тешел“, долен изравнител на централата
- Country: Bulgaria
- Location: Teshel
- Coordinates: 41°39′49″N 24°20′27″E
- Status: Operational
- Commission date: February 1972
- Owner: NEK EAD
- Operator: NEK EAD

Thermal power station
- Primary fuel: Hydropower

Power generation
- Units operational: 2
- Nameplate capacity: 60 MW

External links
- Commons: Related media on Commons

The Teshel Hydro Power Plant (Bulgarian: Водноелектрическа централа "Тешел") is an active hydro power project near Teshel, Smolyan Province, southern Bulgaria. It is situated along the river Vacha in the Rhodope Mountains. It has 2 individual Francis turbines which deliver up to 60 MW of power. The Teshel HPP forms part of the Dospat–Vacha Hydropower Cascade (500.2 MW).
