= Teshel =

Teshel Тешел
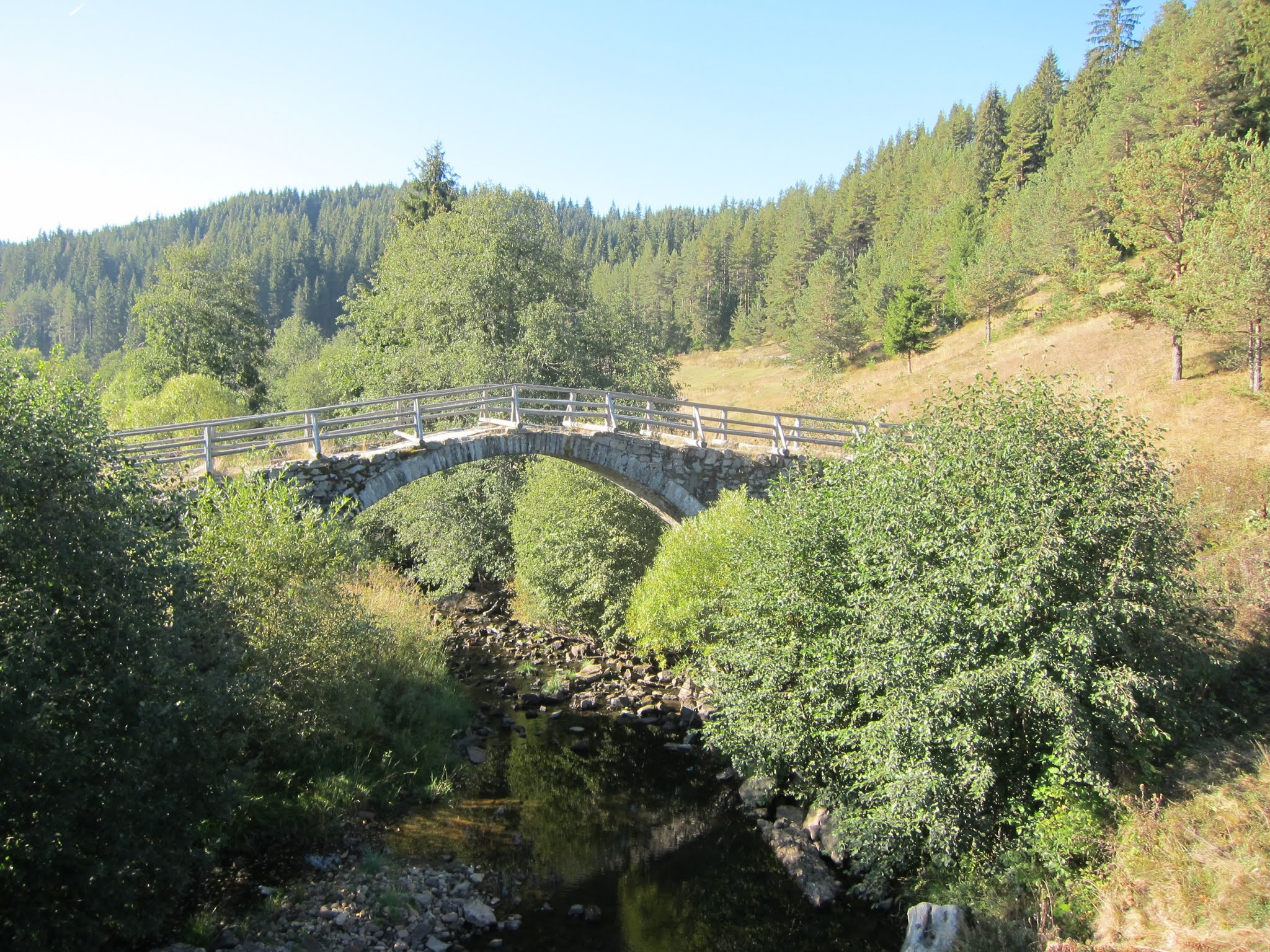

- Location of Teshel, Bulgaria
- Coordinates: 41°40′19.58″N 24°21′7.09″E
- Country: Bulgaria
- Provinces (Oblast): Smolyan Province
- Elevation: 989 m (3,245 ft)

Population (15.09.2022)
  - Total: 0
- Time zone: UTC+2 (EET)
  - Summer (DST): UTC+3 (EEST)
- Postal Code: 4810
- Area codes: 03042 from Bulgaria, 003593042 from outside

Teshel (Bulgarian: Тешел) is a village in southern Bulgaria. It has a population of 0 as of 2022.

== Geography ==
Teshel is located in the western part of Smolyan Province. It is part of Devin Municipality and is within the territory of the village of Grohotno. The closest villages are Borino to the west, Grohotno to the northeast and Gyovren to the east. The village is situated in the western part of the Rhodope Mountains on the river Vacha, just downstream of the Teshel Reservoir, a part of the Dospat–Vacha Hydropower Cascade (500.2 MW).

There are several show caves in its vicinity, including Yagodinska Cave and Devil's Throat Cave.
