= Tsankov Kamak Hydro Power Plant =

Hydroelectric power plant in Bulgaria

Tsankov Kamak Hydroelectric Power Plant
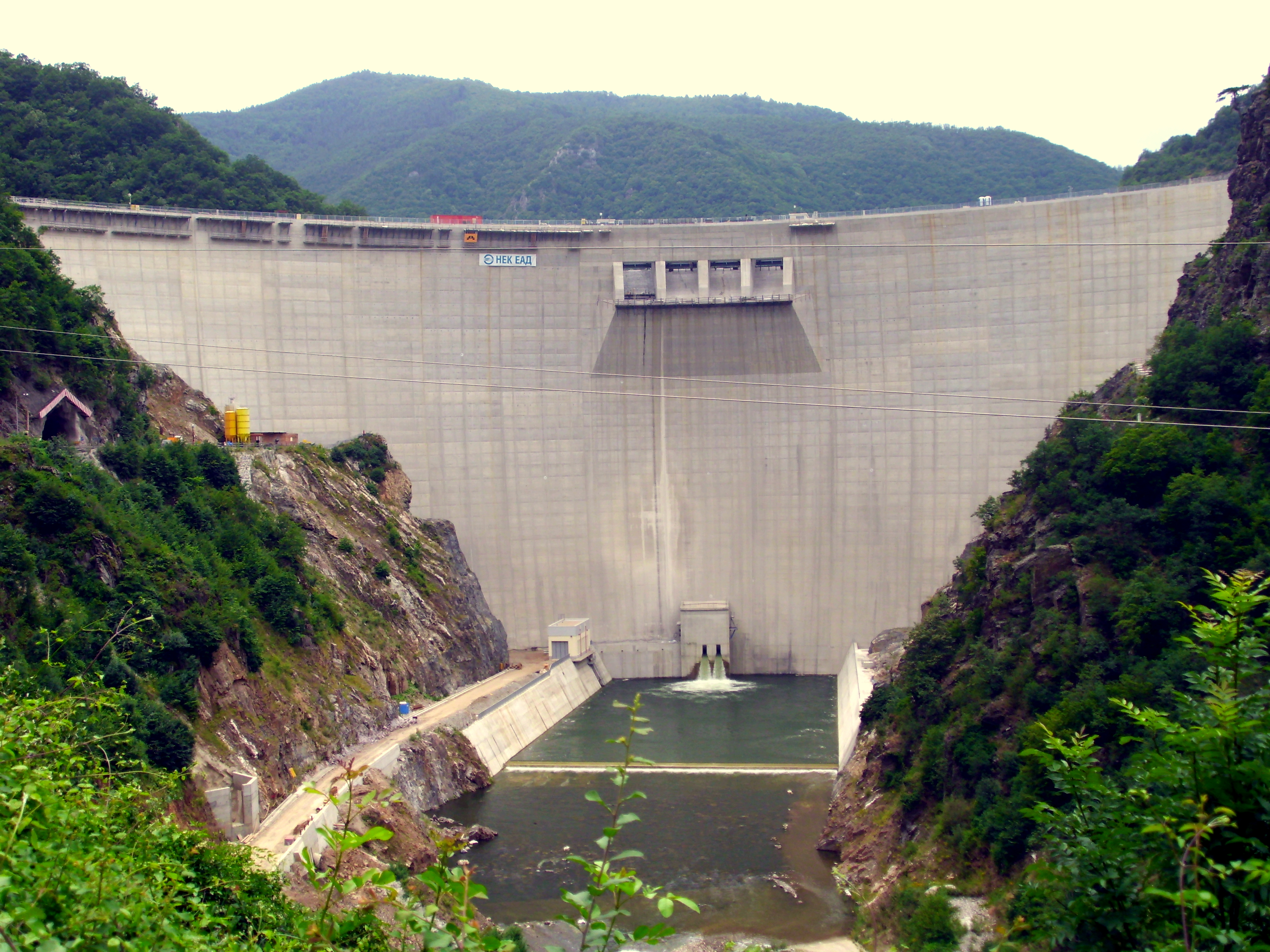
- Tsankov Kamak Dam

- Location of Tsankov Kamak Hydro Power Plant in Bulgaria
- Location: Tsankov Kamak downstream of Devin
- Coordinates: 41°49′56″N 24°25′18″E
- Construction began: 2004
- Opening date: 2011
- Construction cost: Euro 500 Million
- Owner: NEK EAD

Dam and spillways
- Type of dam: Double curvature arch concrete dam
- Impounds: Vacha River
- Height: 130.5 m (428 ft)
- Length: 486 m (1,594 ft)
- Spillway capacity: 1,450 m^{3}/s (51,000 cu ft/s)

Reservoir
- Creates: Tsankov Kamak reservoir
- Total capacity: 111,000,000 m^{3} (90,000 acre⋅ft)
- Catchment area: 1,214 km^{2} (469 mi^{2})
- Surface area: 3.27 km^{2} (810 acres)

Power Station
- Operator: NEK EAD
- Commission date: 2011
- Hydraulic head: 150 m (490 ft) (Gross head)
- Turbines: 2 x 40 MW
- Installed capacity: 80 MW
- Annual generation: 185 GWh

The Tsankov Kamak Hydroelectric Power Plant, also Tsankov Kamak HPP, comprises an arch dam and hydroelectric power plant (HPP) on the territory of the village of Mihalkovo, southwestern Bulgaria. It is situated on the Vacha River in Smolyan Province, on the borders of Pazardzhik Province and Plovdiv Province, roughly 40 kilometres (25 mi) southwest of Plovdiv and downstream (north) of the town of Devin. It is a part of the Dospat–Vacha Hydropower Cascade (500.2 MW) development of the Vacha River involving five dams and seven power stations in the provinces of Smolyan, Plovdiv and Pazardzhik, 250 kilometres (160 mi) southeast of the capital Sofia. The other four dams are Dospat, Teshel, Vacha and Krichim.

The Tsankov Kamak dam is the first double curvature arch dam in cupola shape in Bulgaria. It has a maximum dam height of 130.5 metres (428 ft). It is the second in the cascade series from the upstream end, and the last to be developed. Apart from power generation, the other objectives of the five projects are use of water resources for irrigation, drinking and household water supply. While the cascade development started in 1958, construction of the Kamak power plant started on 29 April 2004 and was completed in 2011. Initial estimated cost of the project was Euro 220 million financed by many banks and equipment manufacturers, including VA TECH Finance, Bank Austria Creditanstalt, BNP Paribas Fortis, Raiffeisen Zentralbank, Société Générale, and Credit Suisse First Boston. However, the final cost of the project has far outstripped the original estimates due to topography, geology and also possible corruption, which were not assessed at the investigation stage of the project.

The carbon emission reduction due to building the Tsankov Kamak HPP is assessed at about 200,000 t CO_{2} (228,000 tons of СО_{2} including the four rehabilitation projects of the cascade). This credit is transferred to the Austrian carbon-credit program under the Joint Implementation Project mechanism which was agreed for the project within the framework of the Kyoto Protocol to partially meet the project costs. For the reduced emissions, Austria compensates Bulgaria at the rate US$10 per ton of carbon emissions. The Joint Implementation Project has two components, one is the Implementation of the Tsankov Kamak HPP and the other is the rehabilitation of the electro-mechanical components of the other four projects in the cascade development. Two more HPPs, the Vacha I and the Vacha II, with total installed capacity of 20.6 MW, are located in the lower part of the cascade.

== Natural landscape ==
The Tsankov Kamak arch dam, associated works and the HPP station are located on the Vacha River, which is the second longest river in Bulgaria. It raises in the Rhodope hill ranges which borders Greece. It is situated on the borders of Smolyan Province, Pazardzhik Province and Plovdiv Province, roughly 40 kilometres (25 mi) southwest of Plovdiv and downstream (north) of the town of Devin. The dam site is located about 400 metres (1,300 ft) downstream of the confluence of the Vacha River and the Gashnya River, in the valley known as Gashnya Valley. The catchment area at the dam site is 1,214 square metres (13,070 ft^{2}) and the annual flow is assessed to be approximately 650 million cubic metres with an average inflow of 69.5 cubic metres (2,450 ft^{3}) per second. The dam has been designed for a gross storage of 111 million cubic metres.

The hydropower potential in the river between Sredna and Vacha had remained unexploited under the five dams development initiative, but is now utilized through the Tsankov Kamak project. The reservoir submergence is in rocky terrain, which is deforested and has unproductive vegetation. The catchment is highly rugged and mountainous with high altitudes, high watershed flats, deep ravines and large tectonic kettles. The upper and lower course of the river flows through deep cut banks.

In the narrow valley stretch of the Vacha River where the project is located, the geological formation consists of sound granites and gneissic formations except for a small patch of about 7 metres (23 ft), which is the fractured zone of mylonites, which was filled up with concrete. The dam’s rock foundation has seven types of rocks with elastic modules values varying from 12,000 MPa to 72,000 MPa and a Poisson’s ratio varying between 0.24 and 0.27. The damping ratio of 10% for this foundation has been adopted in the dynamic analysis. The intake structure and the pressure tunnel pass through difficult geological formations. Due to this geological feature, particularly at the intake structure, an area of about 6,000 square metres (65,000 ft^{2}) was required to be plugged in the Gashnia Valley.

== Construction ==
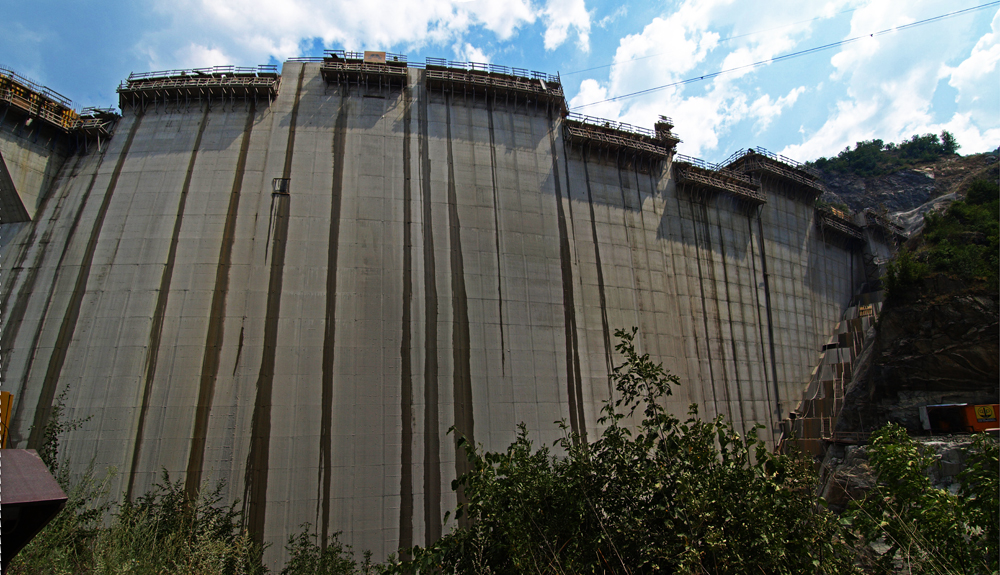
Tsankov Kamak Hydro Power Plant

The Natsionalna Elektricheska Kompania EAD (NEK EAD) was awarded the contract to the project in 2001, and in November 2003 they forwarded their plans to start construction of the project to the Government of Bulgaria. At the end of the year 2003, Alpine Mayreder, an Austrian company, was awarded the civil works contract of the project. The equipment supply and installations were awarded to Austrian group of suppliers, Andritz Hydro for HEM – equipment and Pöyry Energy GmbH for engineering with Energoproekt Hydropower as a Bulgarian Co-designer of the project The project was financed by export and commercial credits, which were finalized in Vienna on 14 November 2003; the financial credit without any backup guarantee by the Government of Bulgaria. The total value of the financing contract was roughly €220 million (€216 million has been specifically cited), with bank security provided by the Oesterreichische Kontrolbank Aktiengellschaft. The balance amount was financed by the commercial credits provided by VA TECH Finance, Bank Austria Creditanstalt, BNP Paribas Fortis, Raiffeisen Zentralbank, Société Générale, and Credit Suisse First Boston who organized the bank credits. Insurance coverage for the export credit of €100 million was provided by Coface of France; Hermes of Germany; EKN of Sweden and Egap of the Czech Republic apart from the Oesterreichische Kontrollbank (OeKB) which has also covered political and the commercial risks.

Construction of the project was considered a challenge in view of the terrain and geologically weak structural region. The building of a new road of about 22 kilometres (14 mi) in difficult terrain, with frequent landslides and rockfalls, caused problems in road construction. This significantly increased the cost of the project up to roughly €500 million. Civil construction works involved six million cubic metres of excavation, two million cubic metres of filling, 850,000 cubic metres of batching and mixing of concrete and placing 100,000 anchors with a total combined length of about 400 kilometres (250 mi). Concreting was done in 3 metre lifts. A service road of 6 metres in width was built on top of the dam. Apart from the Christian Schild and 60 engineers of the Alpine Slovakia and contractors of civil engineering works of the project, some 1200 Bulgarian workers were involved in its construction at one point. Work was carried out continuously, involving 535,000 cubic metres of concrete delivered by a crane of 26 tons capacity, which was erected across the river over the dam. The concreting of the dam began in October 2007 and was completed in January 2010.

== Project features ==
=== Dam ===
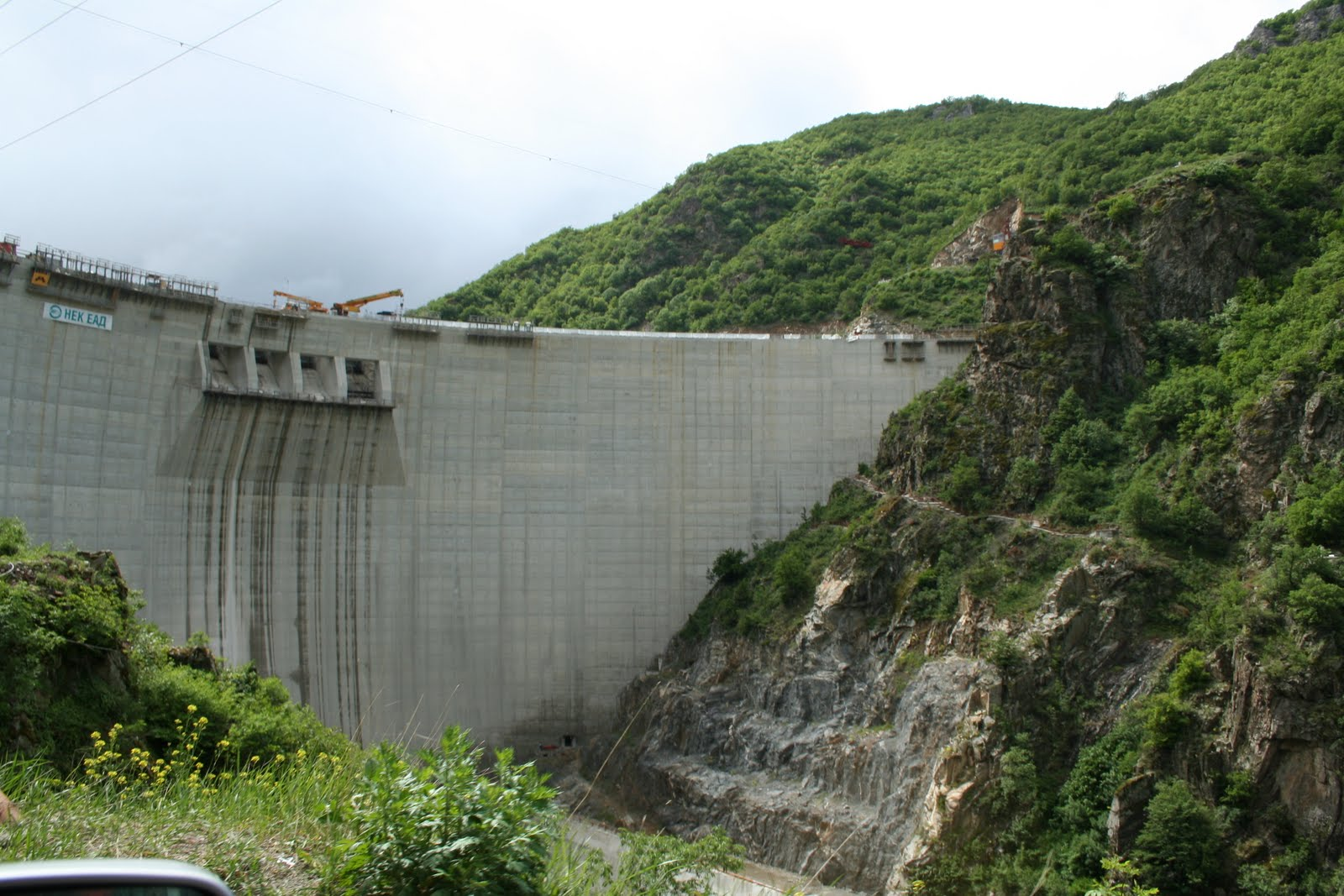
Tsankov Kanak Dam spillway openings of 8 m x 8 m

The double curved arch dam is 130.3 metres (427 ft) in height with a reservoir water spread area of 3.27 square kilometres (1.26 mi^{2}). It has four spillway blocks designed for a maximum flood discharge of 1,425 cubic metres per second (50,300 cu ft/s), each provided with radial gates, and has a pressure shaft of 4.4 metres (14 ft) in width and 600 metres (2,000 ft) in length which is steel lined and bifurcated at the lower end to feed the turbines from the intake on the upstream on the left bank of the dam. It feeds two units of 40 MW capacity turbine generators (Francis Turbines) housed in a surface powerhouse, a tailrace channel of 700 metres (2,300 ft) length, and a balancing channel of 1,300 metres (4,300 ft) length. These features are elaborated further with relevant design details. It has gross storage capacity of 111 million cubic metres.

The Tsankov Kamak dam has a total length of 459.4 m and crest level of EL 688.50 m, with 22 cantilever blocks which are "interconnected by a system of shear boxes", which are tangential to the axis at the crest, and the gravity blocks abut on the left and right banks. Horizontal sections of the arch dam are of parabolic shape with fixed thickness. A series of 10 centimetres (3.9 in) thick shear key locks on both surfaces of each cantilever block are provided to achieve uniform distribution of shear force between the blocks. The dam width at the top is 8.8 metres and at the foundation the base is 26.36 metres (86.5 ft). The curved part of the arch dam is 340 metres in length and its chord length is 345 metres (1,132 ft) . The maximum reservoir water level is EL 685.00 m and the minimum draw down level is EL 670.00 m with a storage capacity of 41 million cubic metres.

The spillway has four bays located in the middle section of the dam controlled by radial gates of 8 m x 8 m size each designed to pass a 1 in 1000 year frequency flood of 1,425 cubic metres per second (50,300 cu ft/s), which raises the water level to EL 687.42 m (all gates open condition) thus allowing for a free board of 1.42 metres (4.7 ft) to top of the dam. The spillway energy dissipation chute has aeration baffle blocks. Over the dam height of 130.5 metres, five galleries are provided in the body of the dam; the gallery at the bottom has been used initially for grouting of the foundation and for drainage and four horizontal inspection galleries at different elevations (at 30 metres (98 ft) interval).

The reservoir stretches over a surface area of 3.27 square kilometres (810 acres) and a length of 22 kilometres (14 mi). The filling of the reservoir was started in June 2010 and completed over roughly 15 weeks. A reservoir management plan envisages fish farming and reservoir operation and maintenance along the periphery of the reservoir and its tributaries. Two bottom outlets in the form of steel pipes of 1.3 metres (4.3 ft) diameter, each of 28.3 metres (93 ft) length have been provided in the body of the dam which facilitates emptying of the reservoir in any emergency; it takes about 11–12 hours to empty the reservoir. The outlets have been provided with slide gate controls on the downstream end. The stilling basin of the spillway is also used for energy dissipation of the outflows from the bottom outlets. The penstock/pressure shaft is in the form of a steel lined pressure shaft which is 4.4 metres (14 ft) diameter to carry a discharge of 69.5 cubic metres per second (2,450 cu ft/s) for power generation. It is 609 metres (1,998 ft) in length (with 10% slope). and bifurcates into two at the bottom end to feed two turbines, each of 40 MW capacity. Slope protection in the 22 kilometres (14 mi) long stretch of the reservoir spread (up to a surface area of 3.24 square kilometres (1.25 mi^{2})) also involved concreting to the extent of 40,000 cubic metres (1,400,000 ft^{3}) to take care of draw down condition for operating the power stations of the cascade under two daily peaks in the morning and evening.

=== Power station ===
The surface power station at the end of pressure shafts has two units, each of 40 MW capacity (Francis turbines) operating under a gross head of 150 metres (490 ft) and an average net head is 133.7 metres (439 ft). The annual energy generation is about 185 GWh. This also has beneficial impact on other cascade development projects in the basin as the energy generation gets enhanced by a 48% increase. The power station is run as a peaking station with two peaks, one in the morning and the other in the evening. With the completion of the Tsankov Kamak HPP, and the rehabilitation of the other HPPs, and all stations connected to a common grid, the efficiency of the whole cascade is improved and energy production rose by a further 16 GWh per annum for the cascade.

The design output of Francis turbines is 41,171 kW each, the turbine speed is 428.6 r.p.m., the generator rating is 46 MVA, and generation voltage is 10.5 kV. An outdoor switch yard is provided next to the surface powerhouse with main two step up transformers of 50 MVA rating and voltage ratio is 10.5/240 kV. The powerhouse is operated both under the remote control mode from the south regional dispatching control and automatically under the local control mode.
