= Tsankov (surname) =

Tsankov (Bulgarian: Цанков) is a Bulgarian masculine surname, its feminine counterpart is Tsankova. Notable people with the surname include:

- Aleksandar Tsankov (1879–1959), Bulgarian politician
- Antoaneta Tsankova (born 2011), Bulgarian rhythmic gymnast
- Antonio Tsankov (born 1990), Bulgarian football player
- Asen Tsankov (1912–1994), Bulgarian tennis player and alpine skier
- Bobi Tsankov (1979–2019), Bulgarian journalist, crime writer and radio personality
- Dragan Tsankov (1828–1911), Bulgarian politician
- Ivan Tsankov (born 1984), Bulgarian football player
- Petko Tsankov (born 1995), Bulgarian football player
- Tsvetomir Tsankov (born 1984), Bulgarian football goalkeeper
