= Maritsa 3 Power Plant =

- Country: Bulgaria
- Location: Dimitrovgrad
- Coordinates: 42°3′15″N 25°37′35″E
- Status: Operational
- Commission date: 1951

Power generation
- Units operational: 2
- Nameplate capacity: 120 MW

External links
- Website: tec-marica3.com

Maritsa 3 Thermal Power Plant (Bulgarian: ТЕЦ Марица 3) is a power plant situated near the city of Dimitrovgrad, southern Bulgaria. It has an installed capacity of 120 MW.

== See also ==
- Energy in Bulgaria
