= Krichim =

Krichim Кричим
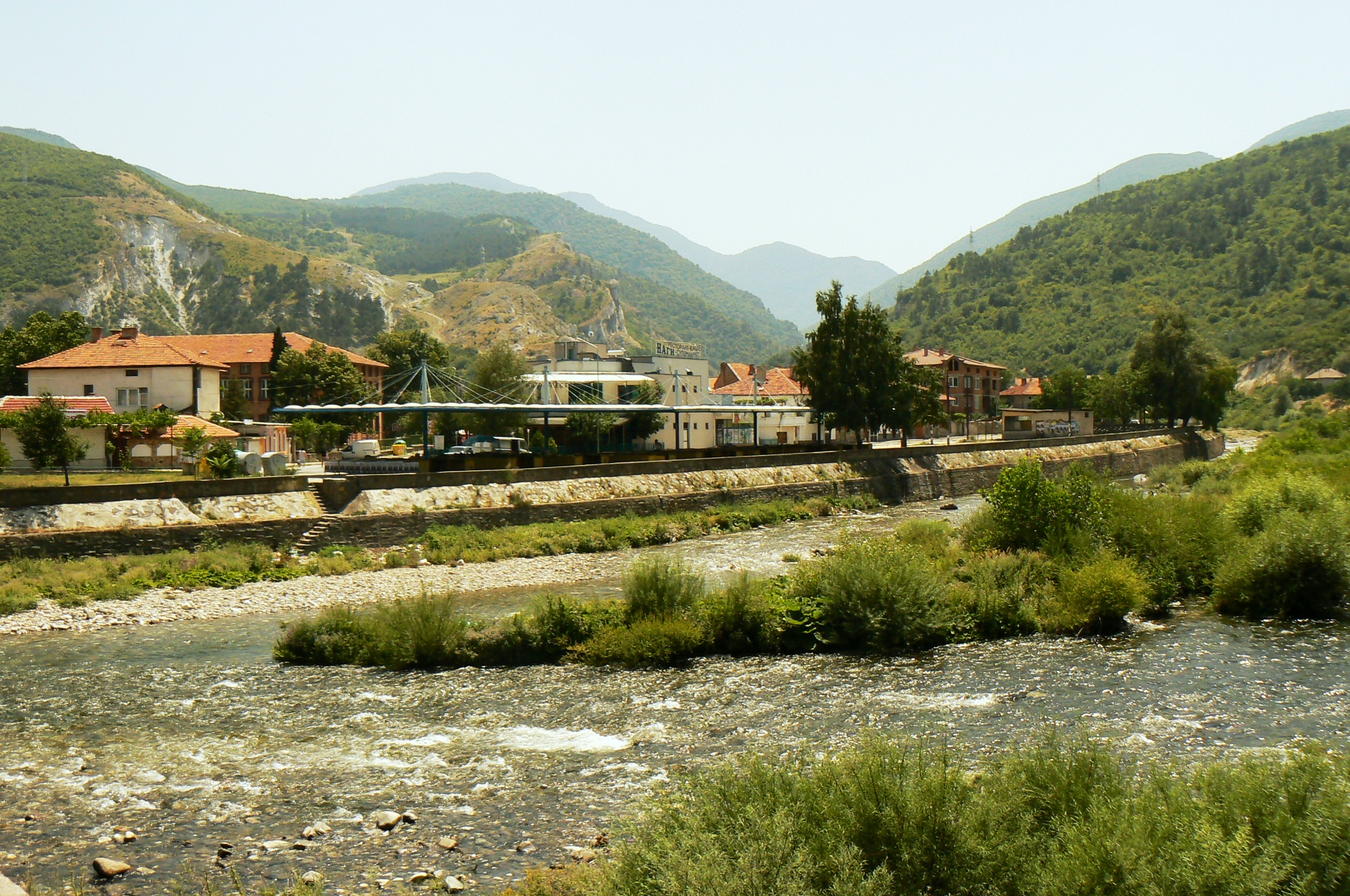
- The Vacha River passing through Krichim

- Location of Krichim
- Coordinates: 42°3′N 24°28′E
- Country: Bulgaria
- Province (Oblast): Plovdiv

Government
  - Mayor: Atanas Kalchev
- Elevation: 253 m (830 ft)

Population (13.09.2005)
  - Total: 9,513
- Time zone: UTC+2 (EET)
  - Summer (DST): UTC+3 (EEST)
- Postal Code: 4220
- Area code: 03145

Krichim (Bulgarian: Кричим [ˈkrit͡ʃim]) is a town in Bulgaria, located in the southwestern part of Plovdiv Province close to Perushtitsa. It lies at the foot of the Rhodopes' northern slopes in the plains of Thrace, 20 km southwest of Plovdiv. The river Vacha, an important tributary of the Maritsa, runs through the town. Krichim is the only settlement in Krichim Municipality.

Inhabited since early Byzantine times as evidenced by the remains of two ancient fortresses on both banks of the river in the beginning of its gorge, Krichim was contested by the Byzantine Empire and the Bulgarian Empire during most of the Middle Ages. It was conquered by Tsar Ivan Asen II in 1230 and a stone inscription from this period is preserved, saying 'On this stone sat Tsar Asen, when he conquered Krichim'.

During the early Bulgarian National Revival, the village was one of the few in the region to have a monastery school. Two monasteries, one of the Holy Theotokos and one of St Vrach, worked during the Ottoman rule and helped preserve the Bulgarian culture and language.

== Demography ==
The town is populated by both Eastern Orthodox Bulgarians and (Muslim) Turks as well as Pomaks (Muslim Bulgarians) and Muslim Roma. The Sts. Cosmas and Damian Church and the mosque coexist peacefully on either bank of the Vacha.

=== Religion ===
According to the latest Bulgarian census of 2011, the religious composition, among those who answered the optional question on religious identification, was the following:

Religious composition of Krichim Municipality
| Orthodox Christianity | 47.6% |
| Catholicism | 0.6% |
| Protestantism | 1.5% |
| Islam | 13.2% |
| No religion | 1.6% |
| Prefer not to answer, others and indefinable | 35.5% |

== Honour ==
Krichim Peak on Livingston Island in the South Shetland Islands, Antarctica is named after Krichim.
