= NEK EAD =

Natsionalna Elektricheska Kompania NEK
- Industry: Electricity
- Founded: 1991
- Headquarters: Sofia, Bulgaria
- Key people: Georgi Dobrev (CEO)
- Products: generation and trade of electricity
- Revenue: US$1.5 billion (2006)
- Net income: −354,000 Bulgarian lev (2022)
- Total assets: 5,649,000,000 Bulgarian lev (2022)
- Owner: Bulgarian Energy Holding
- Number of employees: 17.678(2025)
- Parent: Bulgarian Energy Holding
- Subsidiaries: HPP Branch, Dams and Cascades Branch
- Website: www.nek.bg

Natsionalna Elektricheska Kompania EAD (NEK) (Bulgarian: Национална електрическа компания ЕАД) is a single-owned joint-stock electric company headquartered in Sofia, Bulgaria. Bulgarian Energy Holding is the holder of the capital of NEK.

The main company's activities are generation and trade of electrical energy. NEK is the owner of 31 hydro and pumped storage power plants with a total installed capacity of 2737 MW. Most of the hydropower is generated within four hydropower cascades: Belmeken-Sestrimo-Chaira; Batak, Vacha, and Dolna Arda. All are used to cover peak loads, and to regulate the grid system.

NEK is a holder of hydro (HPP&PSHPP) generation license, electricity trading license and public power supply license, all issued by EWRC.

NEK, through its branch Dams and Cascades, manages 40 dams and the total capacity of the storage reservoirs operated by NEK represents 50.1% of the total controlled water resources of the country.
