= Hydroelectricity in Bulgaria =

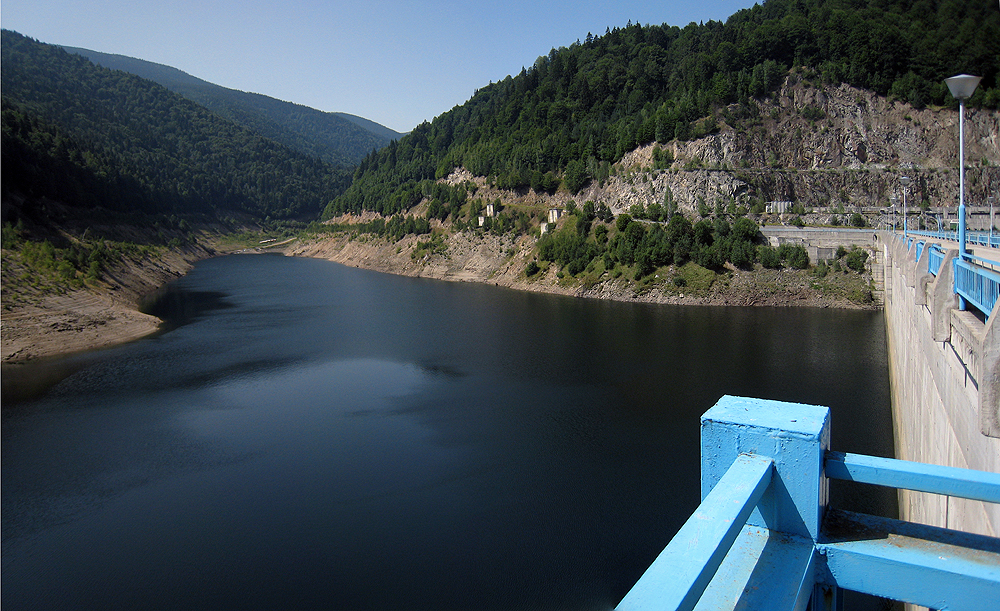
The dam of Chaira Hydro Power Plant, the largest in Bulgaria

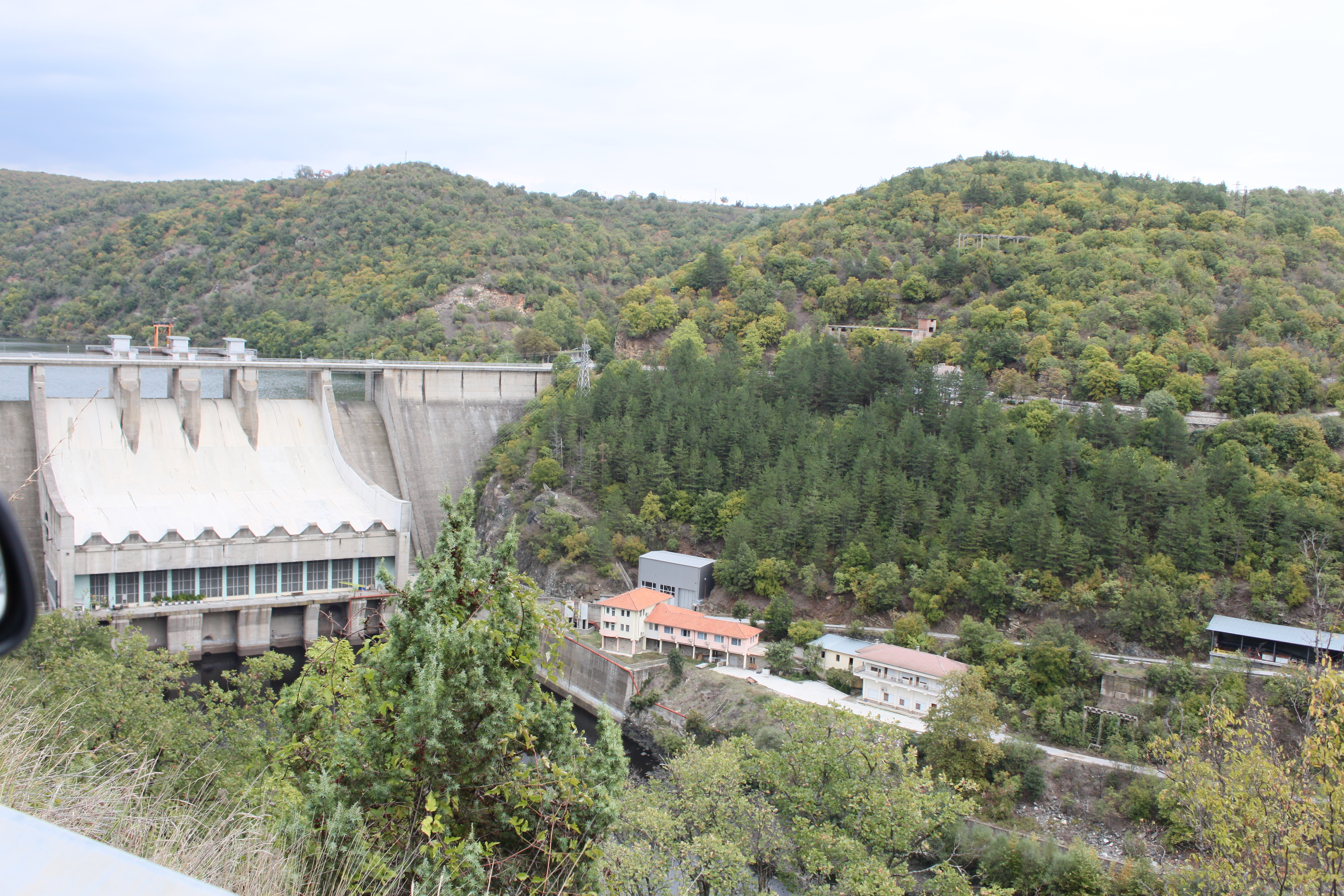
Ivaylovgrad Dam

In 2021, hydroelectricity generated 11% of Bulgaria's electricity. As of 2020, the country's total installed electricity capacity was approximately 12,839 MW, with hydropower contributing 25%, or 3,213 MW.

== Future plans ==
In Bulgaria, the development of small hydropower plants (SHP) is supported by various factors, including open electricity and financial markets, higher feed-in tariffs (FITs) for SHP compared to large hydropower, and diverse financing options such as bank credit, direct private investments, and public–private partnerships. Additionally, opportunities for financing through special trust funds and EU-supported programs are available.

The government 2030 energy plan calls for an additional 870MW of hydro capacity.

The possibility of two hydro dams on the Danube, to be built and shared with Romania, was under consideration in 2023.

Two pumped hydro plants are also planned using the existing Dospat Reservoir and the reservoir at Batak. Each would generate 800MW capacity and provide a means to use excess wind and solar energy by pumping the water back up to the dams. Completion could be by 2032.

== Current facilities ==
Generating over 10% of Bulgaria's electricity, most hydropower plants are owned by NEK EAD and located in the Rhodope Mountains and Rila. The total installed capacity of the NEK EAD-owned HPPs is 2,737 MW. They are grouped in four main hydropower cascades that include several HPPs, dams and other facilities each — Belmeken–Sestrimo–Chaira (1,599 MW) in eastern Rila and the western Rhodopes, Dospat–Vacha (500 MW) in the western Rhodopes, Arda (325 MW) in the eastern Rhodopes and Batak (254 MW) in the western Rhodopes. All of these are located in the Maritsa river drainage, though water is also collected from neighbouring basins, such as those of the Mesta and the Struma via gathering derivations and tunnels. There are three pumped storage hydro power plants, including the Chaira PSHPP (864 MW) — the largest in Southeastern Europe, with an important function to balance short-term consumption changes or shortages in the national grid.

The 15 largest HEP stations, all owned by the state-run National Electricity Company, account for most of the country's HEP installed capacity and HEP power.^{(p. 12, p. 32)} They are arranged in four series, or "cascades", of between three and five reservoirs, and all are located in the Rhodope Mountains in Southwestern Bulgaria. Three of the stations are pumped-storage stations (PS-HPP).^{(p. 14)} Some analysts say that further modernization, such as of its pumped storage hydro, could be profitable.

== Largest power plants ==
Name	Location	Production capacity (MW)	Total production (2011) (MWh)	Constructed	Notes
Belmeken–Sestrimo–Chaira Cascade	Kriva reka, Yadenitsa	1 599	1 395 000	–	–
Chaira PS-HPP		864	774 000	1995	Pumped hydro
Belmeken PS-HPP		375	293 000	1975	Pumped hydro
Sestrimo HPP		240	222 000	1975	–
Momina Klisura HPP		120	105 000	1975	–
Dospat–Vacha Cascade	Vacha	464	530 000		–
Teshel HPP		60	120 000	1972	–
Devin HPP		82	79 000	1984	–
Tsankov Kamak HPP		82	102 000	2011	–
Orfey PS-HPP		160	116 000	1975	Pumped hydro
Krichim HPP		80	113 000	1973	–
Batak Cascade	Stara Reka, Chepinska reka, Devinska reka	254	506 000	1955	–
Batak HPP		47	78 000	1958	–
Peshtera HPP		136	300 000	1959	–
Aleko HPP		71	128 000	1959	–
Arda Cascade (or "Lower Arda Cascade")	Arda River	326	251 000		–
Kardjali HPP		124	74 500	1957	–
Studen Kladenets HPP		82	92 000	1958	–
Ivaylovgrad HPP		120	85 000	1964	–
Other HPPs		83	165 000		–
Total		2 713	2 847 000	–	–

NEK also owns and looks after several large dams which are either used for providing fresh water only, to store water for HPPs downriver, or else have provided HEP power in the past but have ceased to do so.^{(p. 15-17)} These include:

Name	Location	Production capacity (MW)	Total production (2011) (MWh)	Constructed	Notes
Iskar Reservoir	Iskar River, Sofia	–	–	1954	–
Golyam Beglik Reservoir	Kriva Reka, upriver of Belmeken-Chaira Cascade	–	–	1951	–
Dospat Reservoir	Osinska River, upriver of Batak Cascade	–	–	1967	–
Koprinka Reservoir	Tundja River, near Kazanlak	–	–	1956	Covers the ancient city of Seuthopolis

There is also a project for an Upper Arda Cascade, which has been delayed due to complications. This cascade should include three HPPs at Madan, Ardino and Kitnitsa.

== See also ==
- Wind power in Bulgaria
- Solar power in Bulgaria
- Renewable energy by country
