= Belmeken (peak) =

Mountain in Bulgaria

Belmeken (Белмекен)
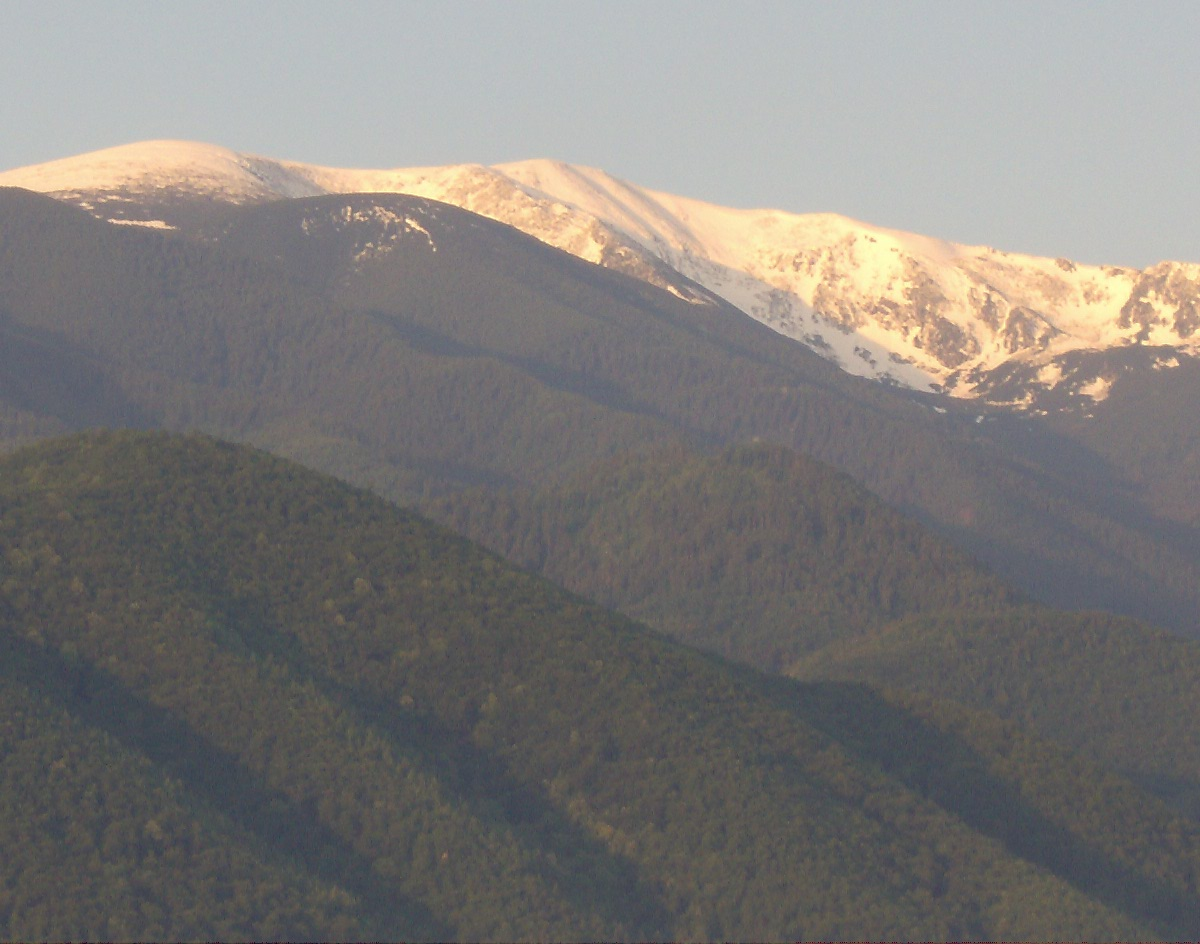

Highest point
- Elevation: 2,626 m (8,615 ft)
- Coordinates: 42°10′50.08″N 23°46′18.36″E

Geography
- Location: Bulgaria
- Parent range: Rila Mountains

Belmeken (Bulgarian: Белмекен) is a summit in the northeastern part of the Rila Mountain in southwestern Bulgaria with a height of 2,626 m. It is built up of granite. Its northern slopes are steep and rise over the Kutlinite cirque. The southern and southeastern slopes are oblique. To the southeast at an altitude of 1,923 m is situated the Belmeken Dam which fuels some of Bulgaria's largest hydro power plants — Chaira Pumped Storage Hydro Power Plant (864 MW), Belmeken Pumped Storage Hydro Power Plant (375 MW), Sestrimo Hydro Power Plant (240 MW) and Momina Klisura Hydroelectric Power Station (120 MW). Close to the summit is the Belmeken High Mountain Sports Complex at an altitude of 2,050 m, used for training, medical and biological research by athletes. The main starting points for climbing are the villages of Yundola and Sestrimo.

In clear days, there is visibility to many of Bulgaria's major mountain ranges, including Pirin, Slavyanka, Vitosha, Balkan Mountains, Sredna Gora, Rhodope Mountains, as well as reservoirs such as Iskar and Batak.

Belmeken is inhabited by the highest-altitude colony of European ground squirrel in the Balkans, as well as by many species of birds, including peregrine falcon, common raven and Eurasian crag martin.
