= Belovo Basilica =

Basilica in Bulgaria

Coordinates: 42°10′46.19″N 23°59′51.11″E

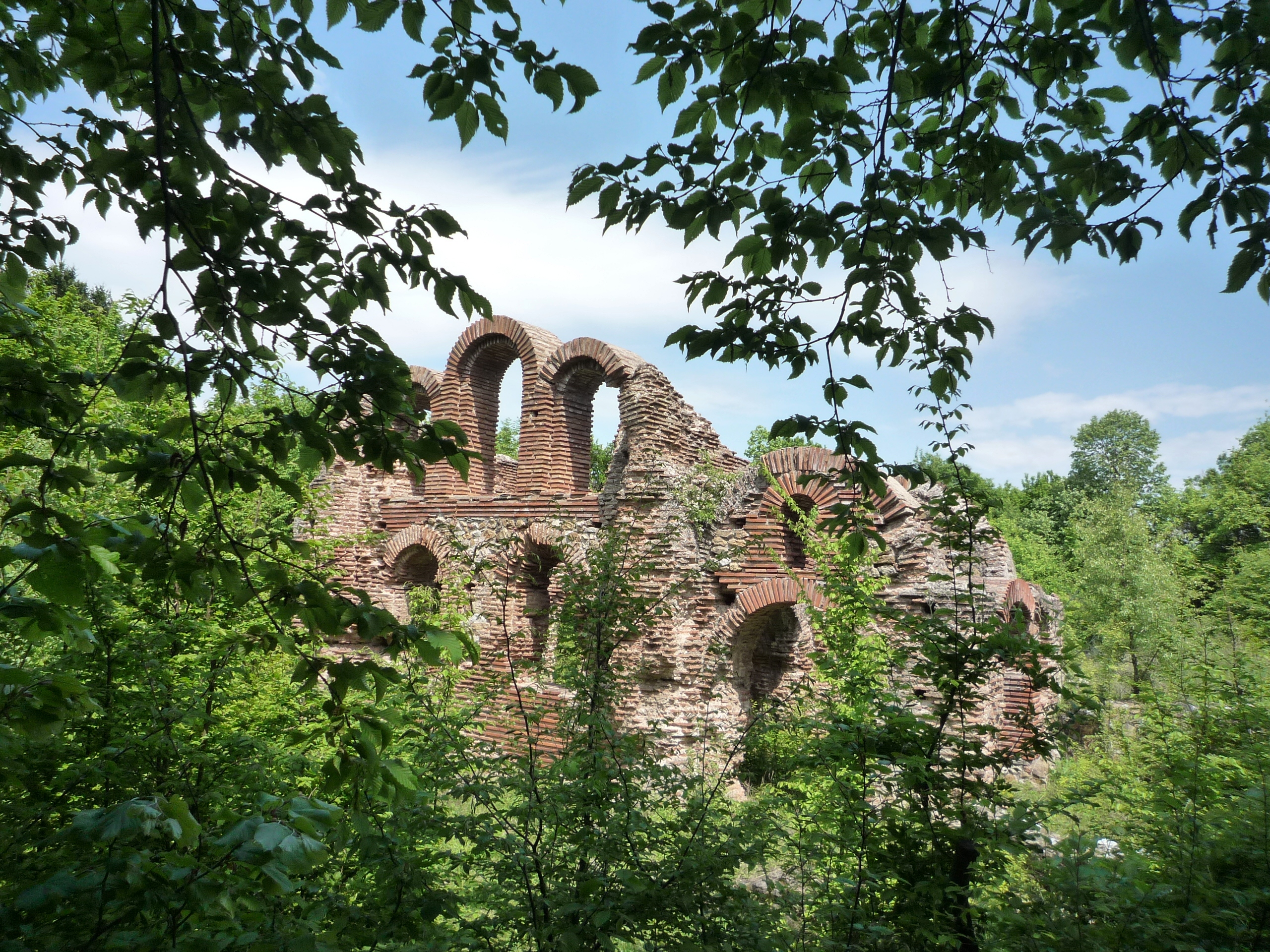
Part of the ruins of the Belovo Basilica

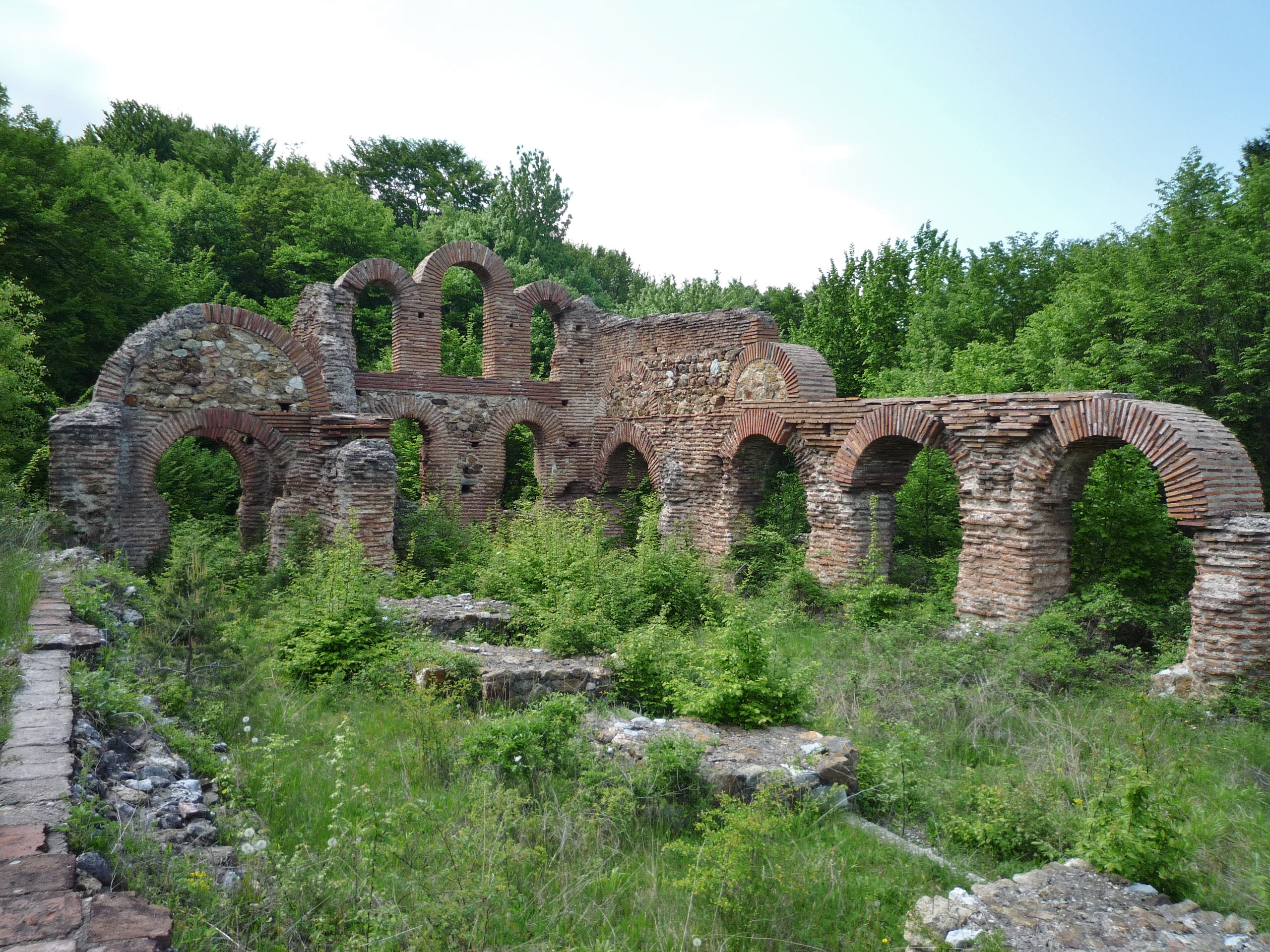
Overview of the ruins

The Belovo Basilica (Bulgarian: Беловска базилика, Belovska bazilika) is a large partially preserved Christian basilica from Late Antiquity near the village of Golyamo Belovo in Belovo Municipality, Pazardzhik Province, southwestern Bulgaria. Located on a hill in the vicinity of the village, the church dates to the 6th century and was first described in the 19th century. It features three naves and three apses as well as a baptistery. Notably, instead of a dome it was covered by a vaulted roof.

== Location and history ==
The basilica is located on the Spasovitsa Hill (or Holy Savior's Hill) 1 kilometre (0.62 mi) to the east of the river Yadenitsa, 1.5 kilometres (0.93 mi) to the south of Golyamo Belovo and 10 kilometres (6.2 mi) south of the town of Belovo. The church is accessible via a road which starts to the east of the village and passes some of its fruit orchards.

Built in the first half of the 6th century, the church has been only partially preserved to this day. Among the sections that are still standing are the north arcade, the south wall of the narthex and monumental west facade. The church was first described in the 19th century by Bulgarian National Revival enlighteners Stefan Zahariev and Petko Slaveykov, followed by a scholarly description by historian Petar Mutafchiev in 1915.

The earliest professional excavations of the church's ruins date to 1924. These were financed by American scholar Thomas Whittemore and carried out by art historian André Grabar. Since 1927, the church has been under state protection as a national antiquity, and in 1966 it was classified as a cultural monument of national importance. In 1994, the basilica underwent partial reconstruction.

== Architecture ==
The chief material employed in the Belovo Basilica's construction were square bricks joined together with mortar. The basilica measures 28 by 17.15 metres (91.9 ft × 56.3 ft). The interior is divided into three naves by two rows of fours columns each running through the middle of the church. Each of the naves has an apse at its east end. The apses are of a semicircular design; the middle apse, the largest of the three, houses a three-tiered synthronon (stone benches for the clergy).

The western section of the church includes a narthex, which has a baptistery with three semi-domes attached to its south wall. There are several entrances to the church, none of which can be considered the main entrance. The basilica is not topped by a dome. Rather, a row of baldachin-like arches acted as its roof. This feature of the basilica's architecture sets it apart from most other examples of early Christian architecture in the Balkans.

While architecture historian Stanford Anderson considers the ruins to be characteristic for the architecture of modern Bulgaria at the time, Bulgarian archaeologist Krastyu Miyatev believes it to be radically different from Bulgaria's other preserved basilicas of the same period. Architecture historian Stefan Stamov likens the Belovo Basilica's plan to that of Mediterranean basilicas and presents the opinion that it was influenced by construction techniques from Asia Minor. The construction materials are, however, typical for the Bulgarian lands.
