= Zlatareva =

Zlatareva is a surname. Notable people with the surname include:

- Ekaterina Zlatareva (1868–1924), Bulgarian actress
- Vera Zlatareva (1905–1977), Bulgarian feminist, author, suffragette and lawyer
