= Belmeken–Sestrimo–Chaira Hydropower Cascade =

- Locations of the Belmeken–Sestrimo–Chaira Hydropower Cascade power plants in Bulgaria
- Interactive map of Belmeken–Sestrimo–Chaira Hydropower Cascade
- Country: Bulgaria
- Location: Pazardzhik Province
- Purpose: Hydroelectricity; Irrigation
- Status: Operational
- Construction began: 1964
- Owner: National Electricity Company
- Belmeken PSHPP
- Interactive map of Belmeken PSHPP
- Location: Sestrimo
- Coordinates: 42.2084°N 23.9158°E
- Status: Operational
- Opening date: 1975

Power Station
- Installed capacity: 375 MW
- Annual generation: 321 GWh
- Chaira PSHPP
- Interactive map of Chaira PSHPP
- Location: Sestrimo
- Status: Operational
- Opening date: 1995

Power Station
- Installed capacity: 864 MW
- Annual generation: 422 GWh
- Sestrimo HPP
- Interactive map of Sestrimo HPP
- Location: Sestrimo
- Status: Operational
- Opening date: 1973

Power Station
- Installed capacity: 240 MW
- Annual generation: 291 GWh
- Momina Klisura HPP
- Interactive map of Momina Klisura HPP
- Location: Momina Klisura
- Status: Operational
- Opening date: 1975

Power Station
- Installed capacity: 120 MW
- Annual generation: 136 GWh

The Belmeken–Sestrimo–Chaira Hydroelectric Cascade (Bulgarian: Каскада „Белмекен-Сестримо-Чаира") is situated in the Pazardzhik Province, southern Bulgaria and is the largest and most complex hydroelectric complex in the country. Located in the eastern part of the Rila mountain range, the complex receives waters from the drainage basins of the major rivers Maritsa, Struma and Mesta. Its catchment area is 458 km^{2}.

It was constructed in stages between 1964 and 1999 and includes two gathering derivations, three reservoirs, two equalizers, two pumped storage hydro power plants and two hydro power plants. The PSHPPs and HPPs are Chaira, Belmeken, Sestrimo and Momina Klisura with a combined installed capacity of 1,599 MW, producing an average of 1,170 GWh annually. It is thus the third largest power producing facility in Bulgaria by installed capacity, following the Kozloduy Nuclear Power Plant (2,000 MW) and the Maritsa Iztok 2 Thermal Power Plant (1,620 MW). The generated electricity is lower compared to other power stations in the country, due to the diversion of water for the supply of Sofia and its intended usage to balance short-term consumption changes.

== Structure ==
=== Belmeken junction ===
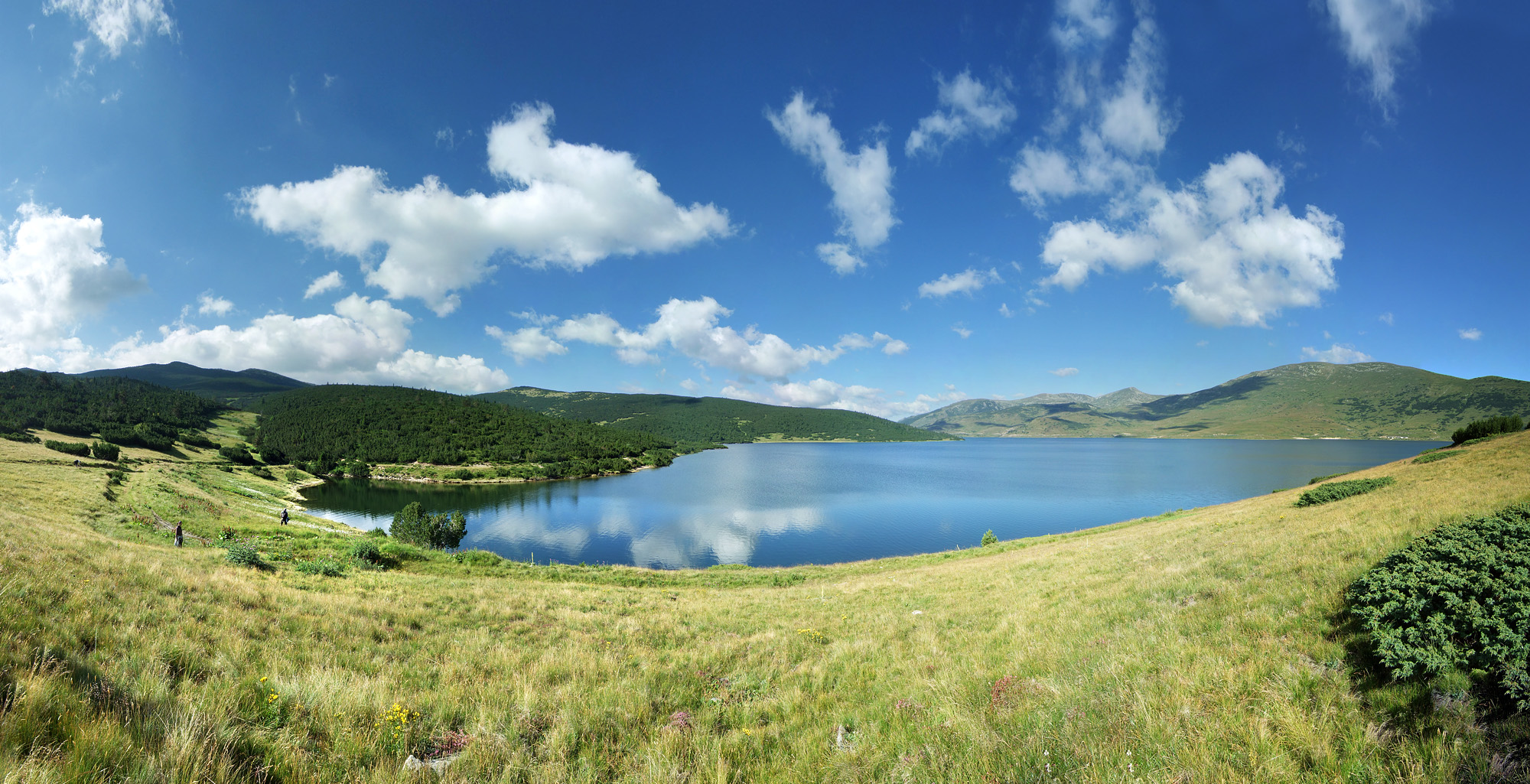
Belmeken Reservoir

The highest section of the cascade includes three gathering derivations covering a total area of 219 km^{2} that catch waters from the drainage basins of the Maritsa (45%), the Mesta (32%) and the Struma (23%). These are the Granchar derivation that gathers water from the upper courses of Mesta's right tributaries — the Cherna Mesta, the Bela Mesta and the Belishka reka, as well as from left tributaries of the Struma, including the Blagoevgradska Bistritsa, the Rilska River; the Dzaferitsa derivation that gathers water from left tributaries of the Mesta and the Chairska reka; and the Maritsa 1900 derivation that catches water from the Maritsa drainage. The Granchar derivation is connected via a 2.8 m reverse tunnel to the Iskar cascade that includes the Iskar Reservoir, which is the main water supplier of the capital Sofia. Between 1983 and 2000 via that tunnel water from the Belmeken–Sestrimo–Chaira Cascade was diverted to ensure additional supply for Sofia.

The system of derivations feeds the Belmeken Reservoir situated at an altitude of 1,923 m on the upper course of Kriva reka, a right tributary of the Maritsa. It was constructed in 1964–1974 and serves as the main accumulating and regulating facility of the cascade. Belmeken has two dams, the main one in its northeastern end built of stone with a height of 88.2 m, and a 23.1 m counter dam to the southwest. It forms a lake with a total volume of 144.1 million m^{3} spanning a territory of 4.6 km^{2}. It serves as the main upper leveler of the two largest pumped storage hydro power plants in Bulgaria.

The reservoir is linked to the Belmeken Pumping Storage Hydro Power Plant via a pressure derivation with a length of 5.2 km. It was completed in 1975 and is powered by water falling from a height of 737 m. The power station is equipped with five Pelton turbines, two of which may also pump water, with a total installed capacity of 375 MW and an average annual production of 321 GWh.

The Chaira Pumped Storage Hydro Power Plant has an electricity generation capacity of 864 MW and a pumping capacity of 788 MW, making it the largest pumped storage plant in Southeastern Europe. The upper leveler of the plant is the Belmeken Reservoir, to which it is connected via two 1.7 km pressure pipelines. The geodetic drop to the lower leveler, the Chaira Reservoir, is 689 m. The machine and transformer rooms are located 350 m underground in specially constructed caverns. The plant has four reversible units with Francis turbines with a capacity of 216 MW each, generating an average of 422 GWh annually.

=== Chaira–Stankovi Baraki junction ===
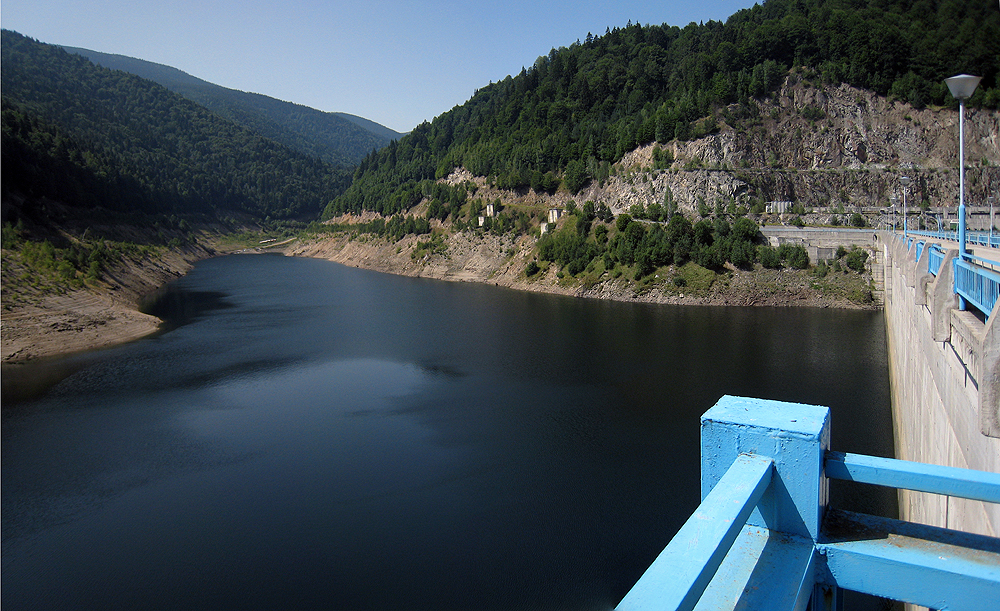
Chaira Reservoir

The second level of gathering derivations is situated at an altitude of 1,200 m and encompasses a total territory of 238 km^{2}. Part of the accumulated water is pumped upstream to the Belmeken Reservoir and the rest is utilized at the power stations downstream. There are three derivations — the Maritsa 1200 derivation that catches water from the Maritsa drainage, the Chairska derivation that gathers water from the Chairska reka; and the Yadenitsa derivation that gathers water from the river Yadenitsa, a right tributary of the Maritsa.

The waters from the second level derivations flow to the small reservoir of Stankovi Baraki, constructed in 1965–1974 at the narrowest point of the Kriva reka valley. It regulates the inflow and serves as the lower leveler of the Belkmeken PSHPP. It has a stone dam and a total volume of 0.42 million m^{3} Stankovi Baraki is linked with the Chaira Reservoir, following the construction of the later, via a derivation.

The Chaira Reservoir is situated about 5 km east of Belmeken on the Chairska reka and was built in 1975–1989. It has a concrete gravity dam with a height of 86.2 m that forms a lake with an area of 0.2 km^{2} and total volume of 5.6 million m^{3}. It serves as the lower leveler of the Chaira and Belmeken PSHPPs. The Chaira Reservoir has a limited catchment area of its own and is mainly fed by water from the Belmeken Reservoir, processed by the two power plants.

A third reservoir, Yadenitsa, is planned to be linked with the Chaira and Stankovi Baraki Reservoirs, in order to increase the leveling and cumulative capacity of the Chaira and Belmeken PSHPPs. Its dam is planned to reach a height of 109.2 m and a length of 315 m and will form a lake with a volume of 14.2 million m^{3}. It will be connected with the Chaira Reservoir via a 6.8 km reverse tunnel. Construction began in 1997 but stalled in 2005 due to lack of funds.

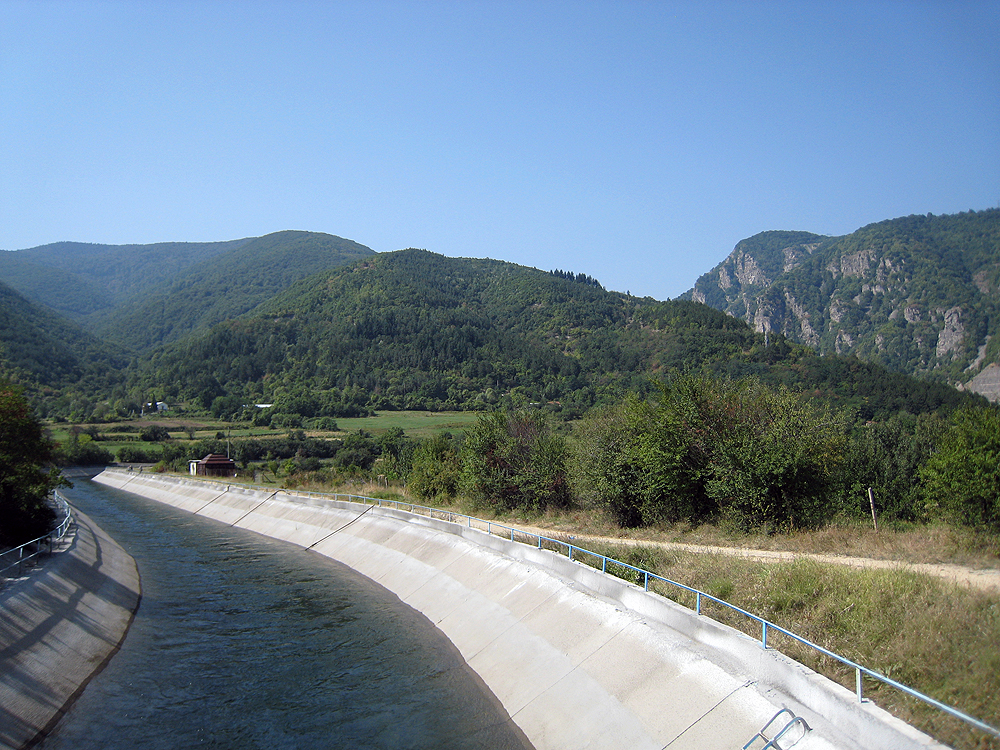
The main derivation of the Sestrimo HPP

The Sestrimo Hydro Power Plant is situated near the village of Sestrimo and was inaugurated in 1973. It is a derivation power plant, linked with the Stankovi Baraki Reservoir via a pressure derivation with a length of 4.9 km and an average water fall of 534 m. The plant has two Pelton turbines with a total installed capacity of 240 MW, generating an average of 291 GWh annually. The processed water flows out through an open channel with a length of 4.3 km.

=== Momina Klisura junction ===
The lowest junction includes the Momina Klisura Hydro Power Plant and its related facilities. The power plant was put into operation in 1975. It has two Francis turbines with a total installed capacity of 120 MW, generating an average of 136 GWh annually and using water discharge of 56.6million m^{3}/s.

The power plant is driven by the processed water from the Sestrimo HPP. The open channel for the outflow water empties into a leveler with a volume of 200 thousand m^{3} From there, the water reaches the Momina Klisura HPP through a 1.2 km pressure pipeline with a diameter between 4.0 and 3.1 m. The processed water is transferred to a small lower leveler and then diverted through a 75 m non-pressurized derivation to the Pyasachnik Reservoir to be utilized for irrigation in the Upper Thracian Plain.

== See also ==
- Energy in Bulgaria
- Hydroelectricity in Bulgaria
- Batak Hydropower Cascade
- Dospat–Vacha Hydropower Cascade
- Geography of Bulgaria
- Rila
