= Yadenitsa =

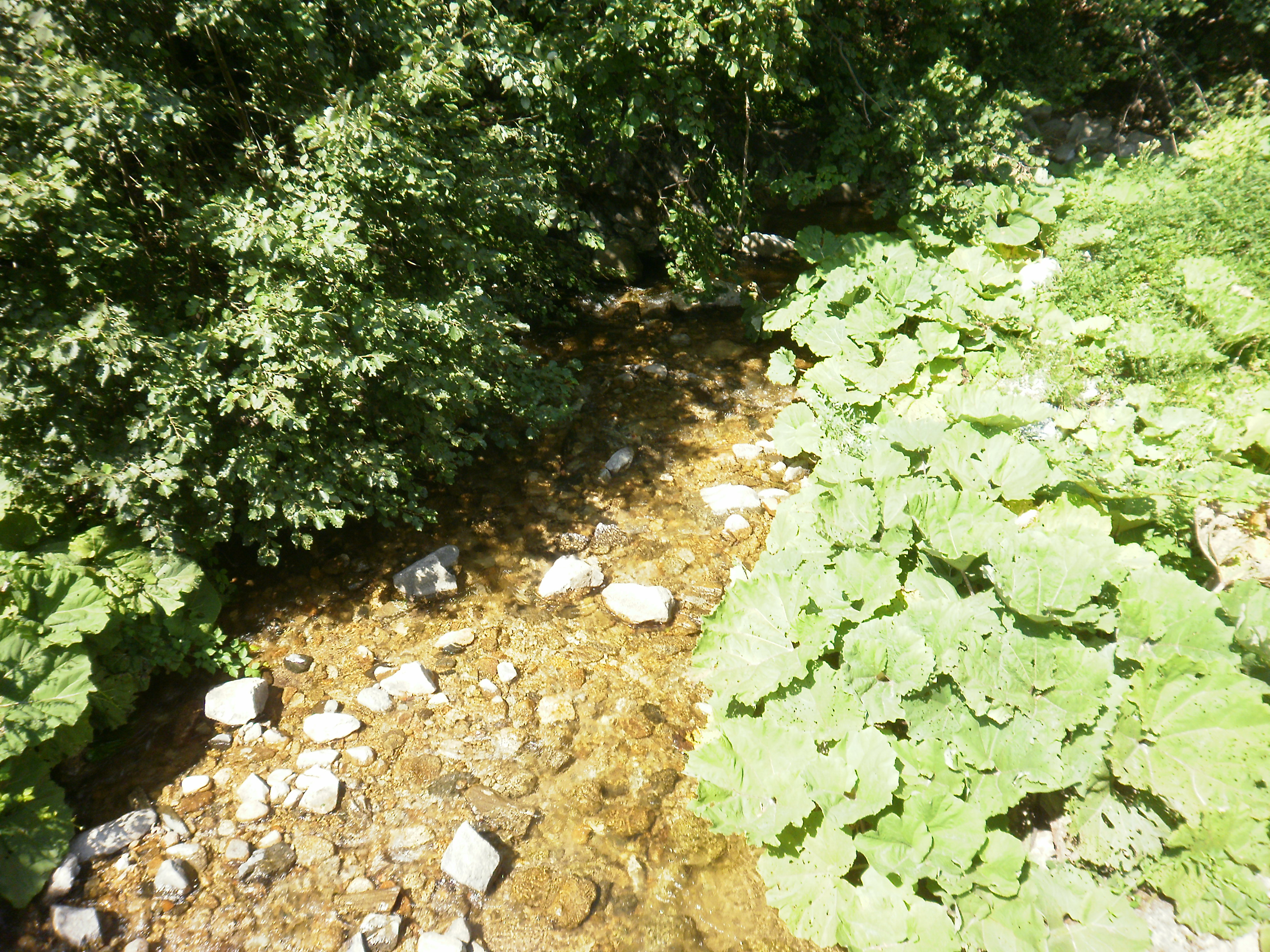

Location
- Country: Bulgaria

Physical characteristics
- Source
  - location: Chakaritsa locality, Rila
  - coordinates: 42°7′21″N 23°47′38.04″E
  - elevation: 1,992 m (6,535 ft)
- Mouth
  - location: Maritsa
  - coordinates: 42°12′57.96″N 24°1′5.16″E
  - elevation: 317 m (1,040 ft)
- Length: 26 km (16 mi)
- Basin size: 138 km^{2} (53 sq mi)

Basin features
- Progression: Maritsa→ Aegean Sea

The Yadenitsa (Bulgarian: Яденица) is a 26 km-long river in southern Bulgaria, a right tributary of the river Maritsa.

== Geography ==
The river takes its source under the name Kurtovsko Dere at an altitude of 1,992 m, about 1.7 km north of the now abandoned Hristo Smirnenski Refuge in the Chakaritsa locality, eastern Rila mountain range. It initially flows southwards and southeast of the refuge turns east, and then northeast in a narrow steep valley that forms the orographic boundary between the major mountain ranges Rila and Rhodope. At the village of Golyamo Belovo the Yadenitsa valley widens and 3 km downstream it flows into the Maritsa at an altitude of 317 m near the town of Belovo.

Its drainage basin covers a territory of 138 km^{2} or 0.26% of Maritsa's total.

The river has snow-rain feed with high water in April–May and low water in September. The average annual discharge at Belovo is 1.25 m^{3}/s.

== Settlements and economy ==
The river flows entirely in Pazardzhik Province. There are two settlements along its course: the town of Belovo and the village of Golyamo Belovo in Belovo Municipality. A 21 km stretch of the third class III-842 road Yundola–Belovo follows most of its valley. The Yadenitsa Reservoir was under construction between 1997 and 2005 but was put on hold due to lack of financing. The reservoir will be part of the largest hydro power cascade in Bulgaria, Belmeken–Sestrimo, which includes the hydro power plants of Belmeken (375 MW) Chaira (863 MW) and Sestrimo (240 MW). The waters of the Yadenitsa are diverted via a tunnel to the Chaira Reservoir to be utilized for electricity generation. In its lower course the waters are used for irrigation and for industrial supply of the Belovo paper factory.

== Gallery ==
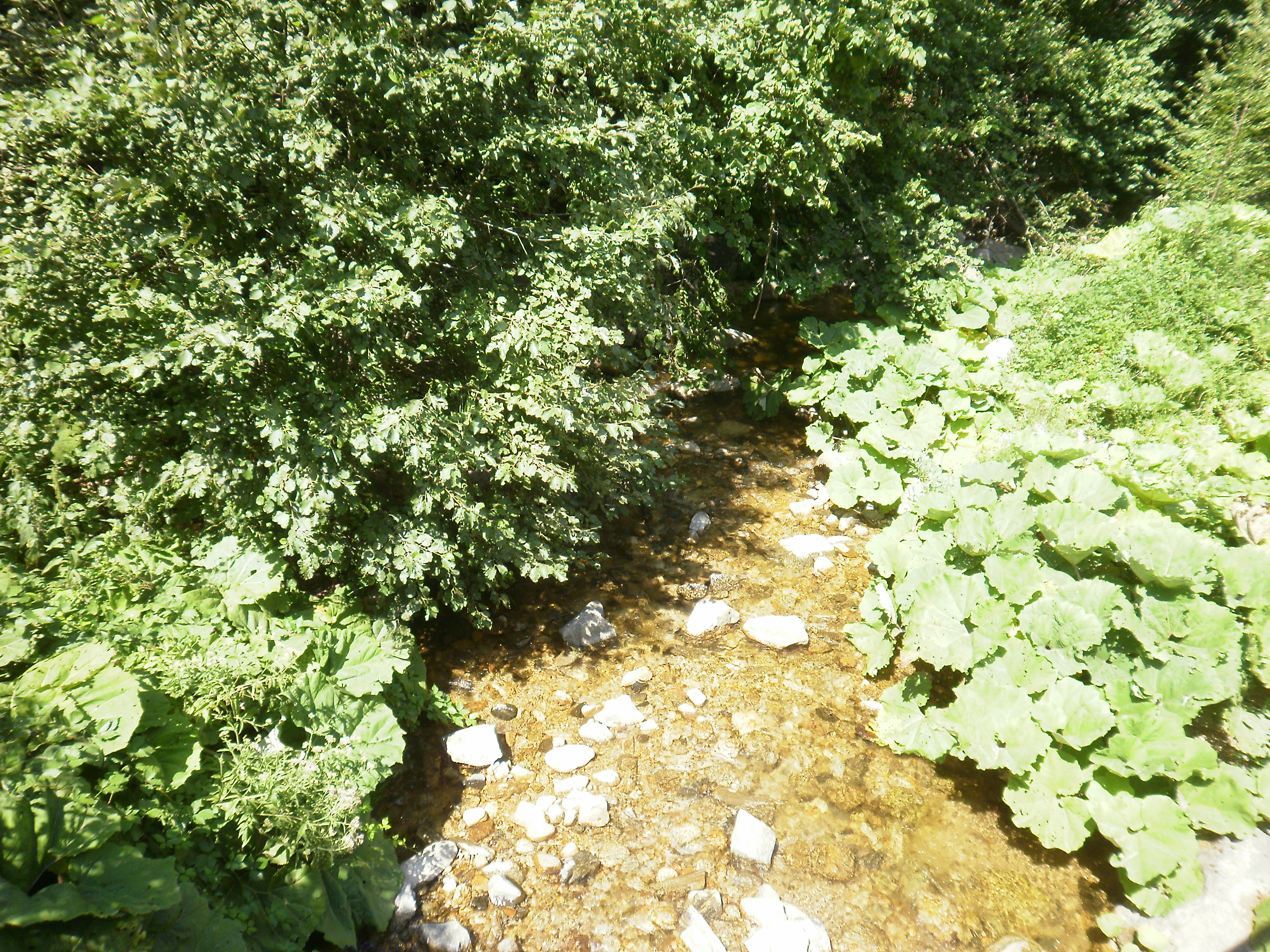
Upper course

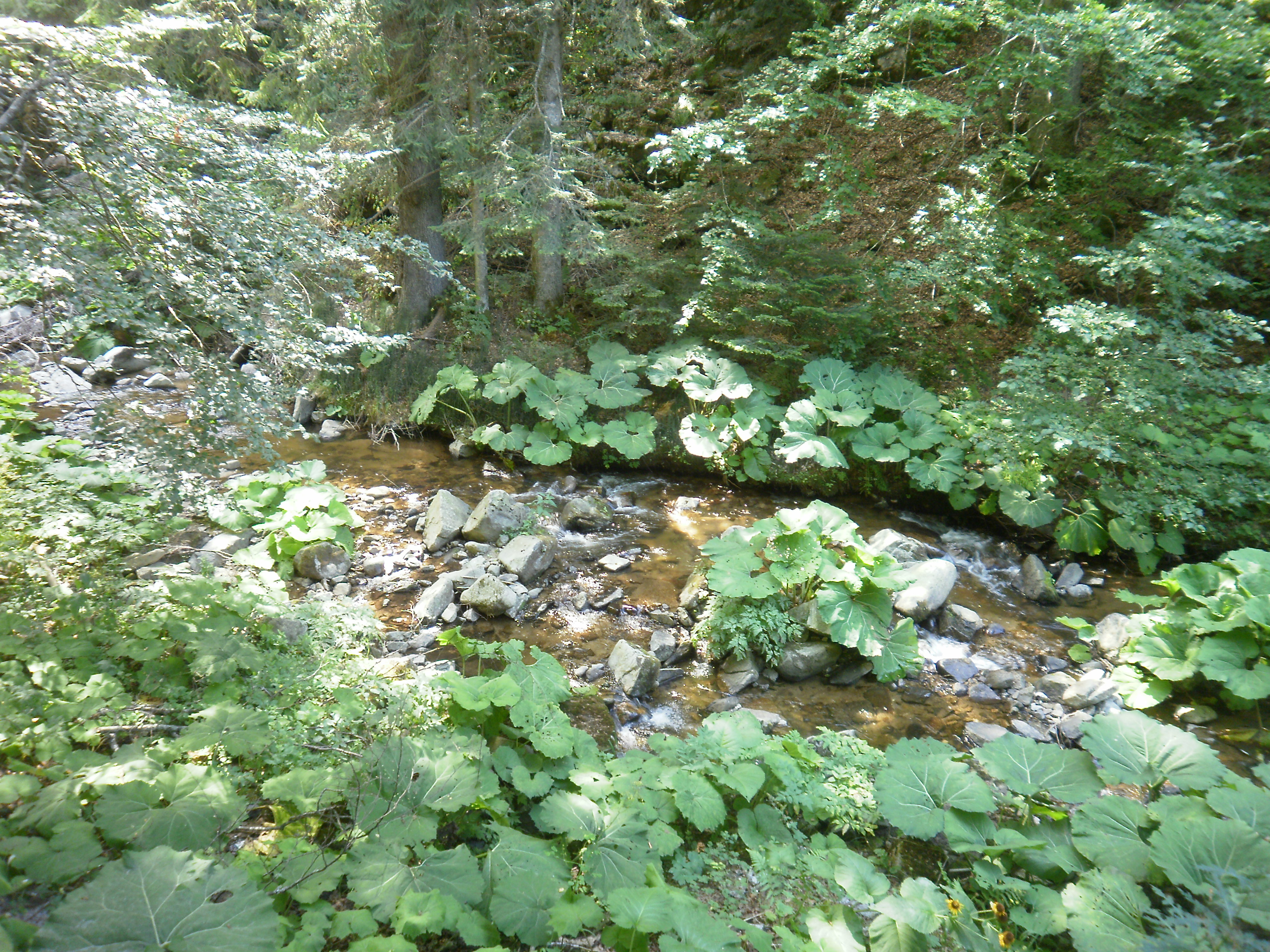
Upper course

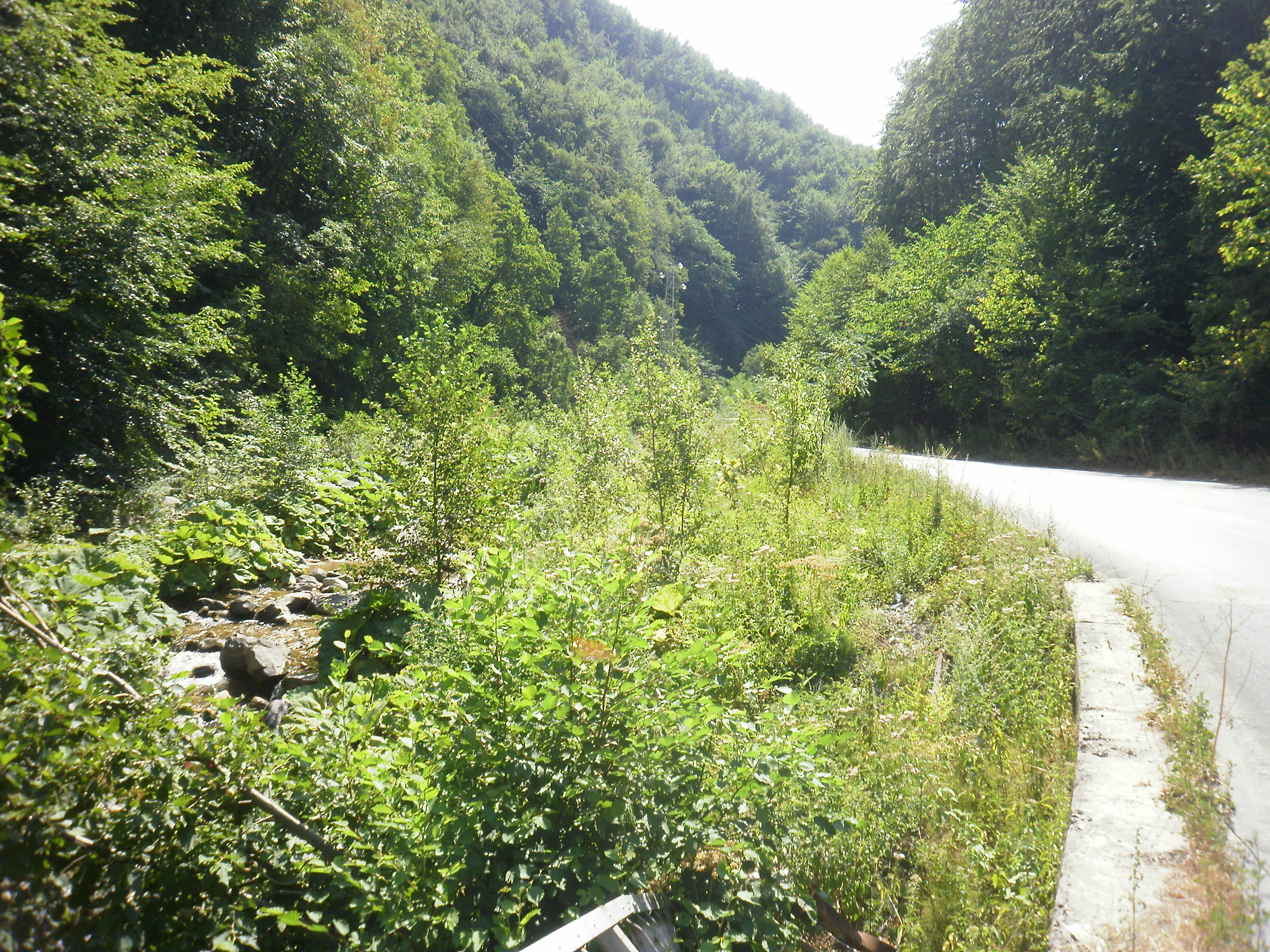
III-842 road along the valley
