= Belmeken Reservoir =

Reservoir in Pazardzhik Province, Bulgaria

Belmeken Dam
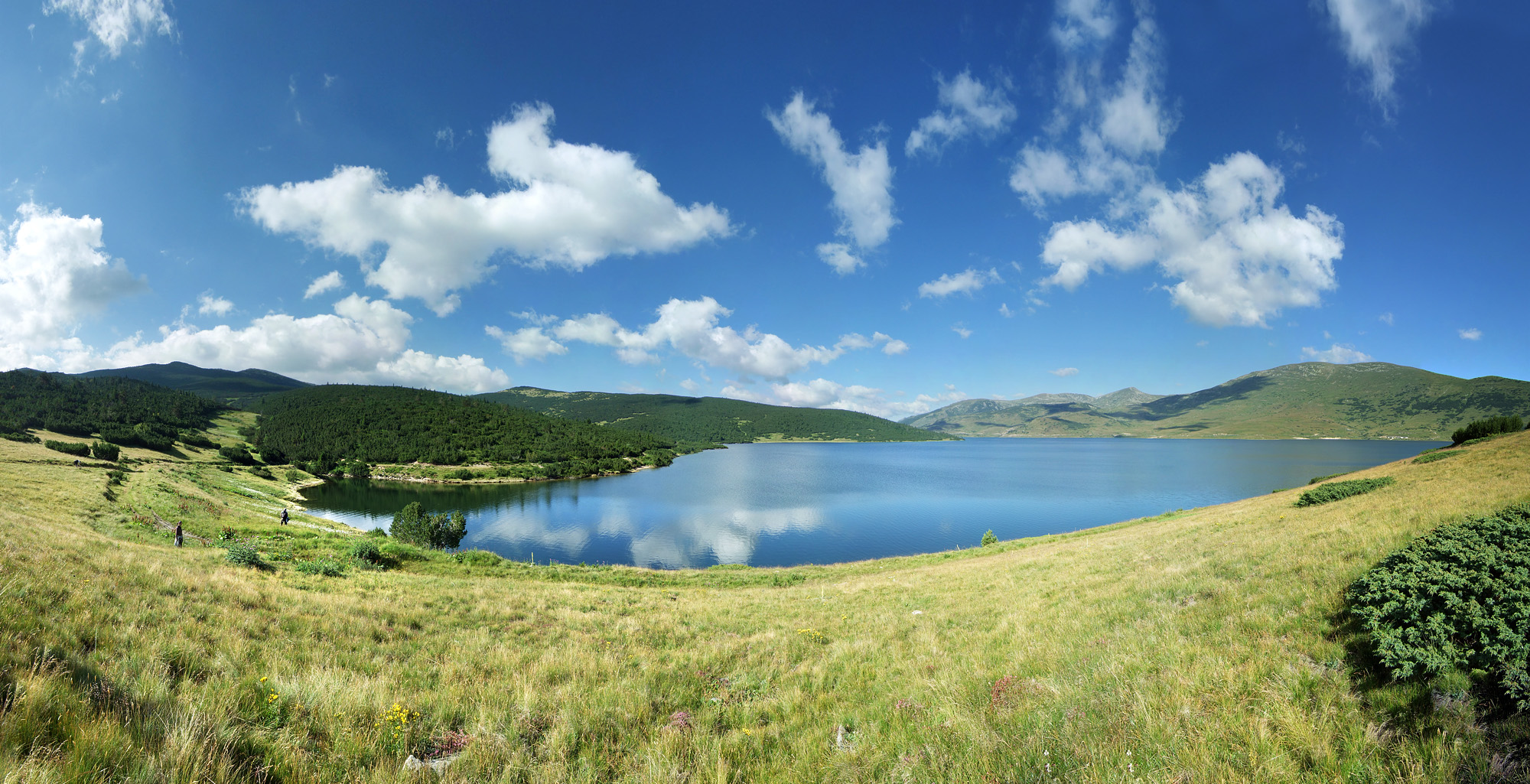

- Location of Belmeken Reservoir in Bulgaria
- Interactive map of Belmeken Dam
- Official name: Язовир Белмекен (Bulgarian)
- Location: eastern Rila
- Coordinates: 42°6′42″N 23°48′1″E
- Construction began: 1964
- Opening date: 1974

Dam and spillways
- Type of dam: stone and earthen gravity dam
- Height: 88 m (289 ft)
- Length: 1,200 m (3,900 ft)

Reservoir
- Creates: Belmeken Reservoir
- Total capacity: 14,410,000 m^{3} (11,680 acre⋅ft)
- Catchment area: 219 km^{2} (85 mi^{2})
- Surface area: 4.6 km^{2} (1,100 acres)

Belmeken Reservoir (Bulgarian: язовир Белмекен) is located in the eastern part of the Rila mountain range of southwestern Bulgaria. It is named after the summit of Belmeken (2,626 m), rising about a kilometer northwest of the lake.

== Location ==
Belmeken Reservoir lies at an altitude of 1,923 m on the upper course of the river Kriva reka, a right tributary of the Maritsa. Administratively, it belongs to the Belovo Municipality of Pazardzhik Province and the nearest settlement is the village of Sestrimo; the border between Pazardzhik and Blagoevgrad Provinces runs along the counter dam at its southwestern part. The main starting points for hiking to the dam are at the villages of Sestrimo to the northeast and Yundola to the south.

It is almost entirely surrounded by Rila National Park, although the reservoir itself is outside the park's limits which follow most of Belmeken's shoreline. A few hundred meters southwest of its southwestern tip, at an altitude of 2,050 m, is located the Belmeken High Mountain Sports Complex used for training, medical and biological research by athletes.

== Dam ==
The reservoir was constructed between 1964 and 1974. Due to suffosion in 1989 it was completely drained in order to repair the dam wall and to build infrastructure for the Chaira Hydro Power Plant, which was under construction in that period. Normal operation was restored in 1991. There are two dams. The main one in the northeastern point is built of stone and earth with a clay core; it is 88.2 m high and incorporates the reservoir's main outlet. The counter dam is located in the southwestern point and is a 23.1 m high earthen structure with a clay core; and incorporates the spillway. The artificial lake has a surface area of 4.6 km^{2} and a volume of 144.1 million m^{3}.

Belmeken is the main accumulating and regulating facility of the Belmeken–Sestrimo–Chaira Hydropower Cascade (1,599 MW), which is the largest hydroelectric infrastructure in Bulgaria. It is fed by a system of gravity derivations that take water from three major river basins in Rila, the systems of the Maritsa (45%), the Mesta (32%) and the Struma (23%). The total length of the derivation channels is 162 km, of them 51 km are underground. It is the upper leveler of the pumped storage hydro power plants of Belmeken (375 MW) and Chaira (840 MW) further downstream.

== Gallery ==
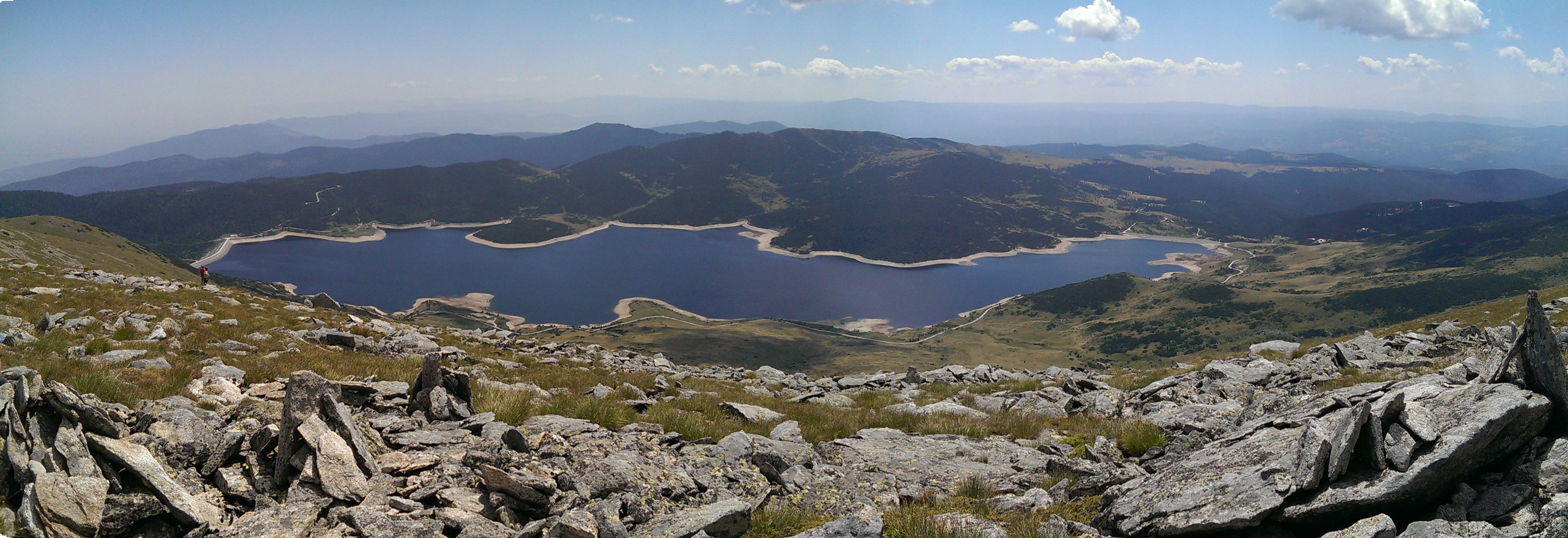

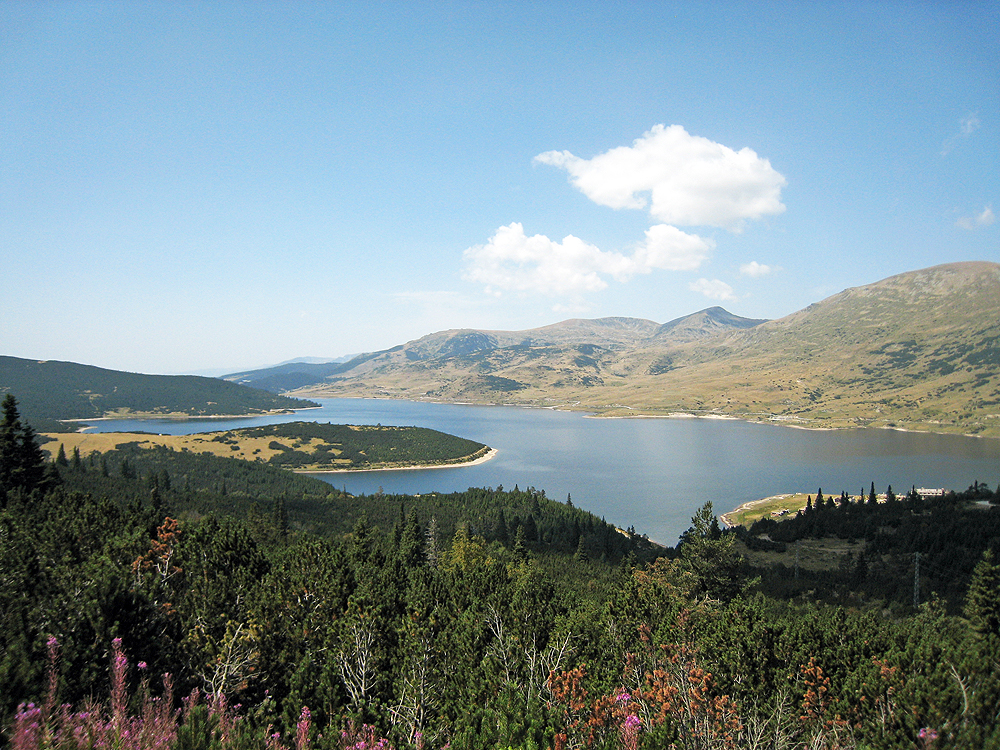

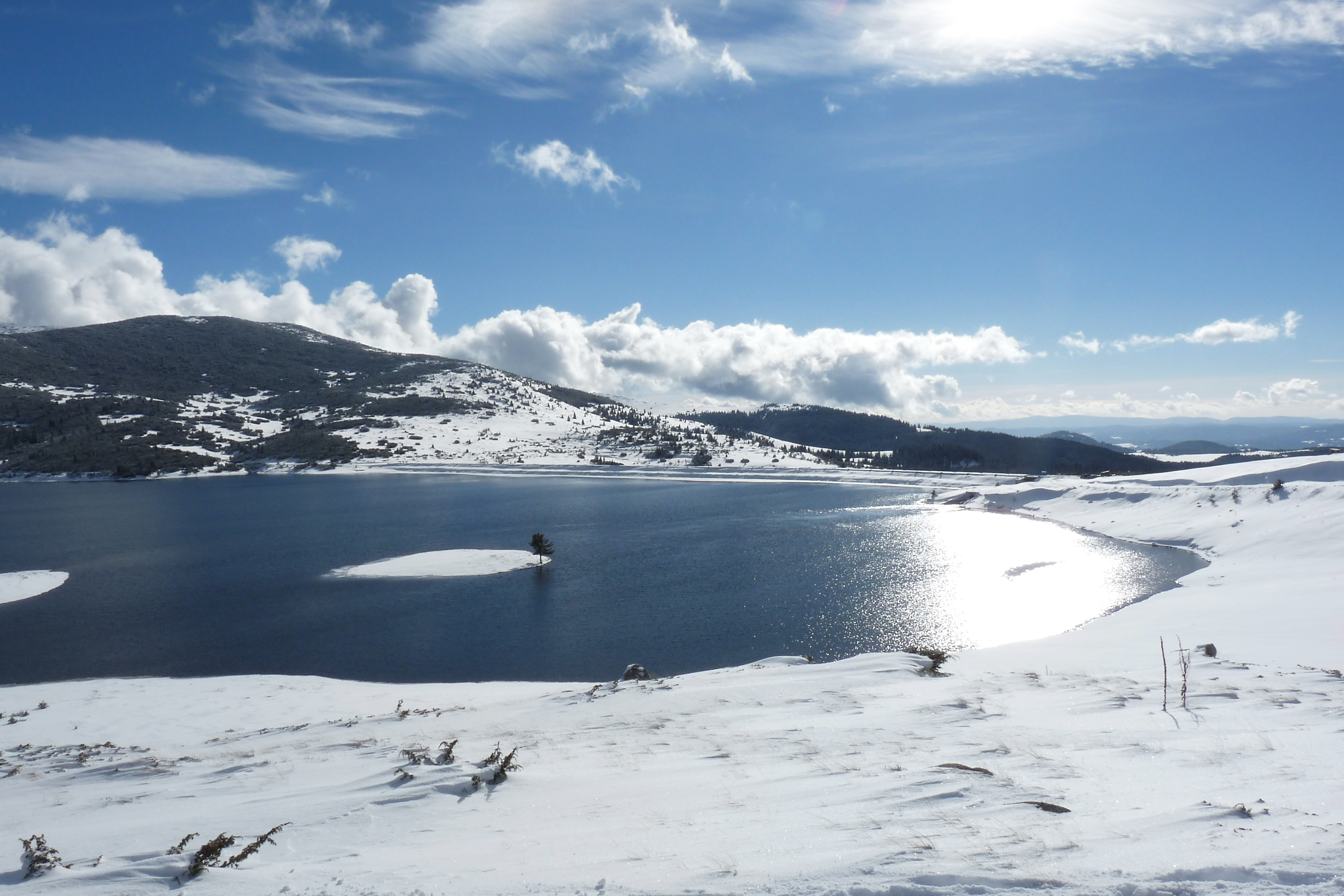

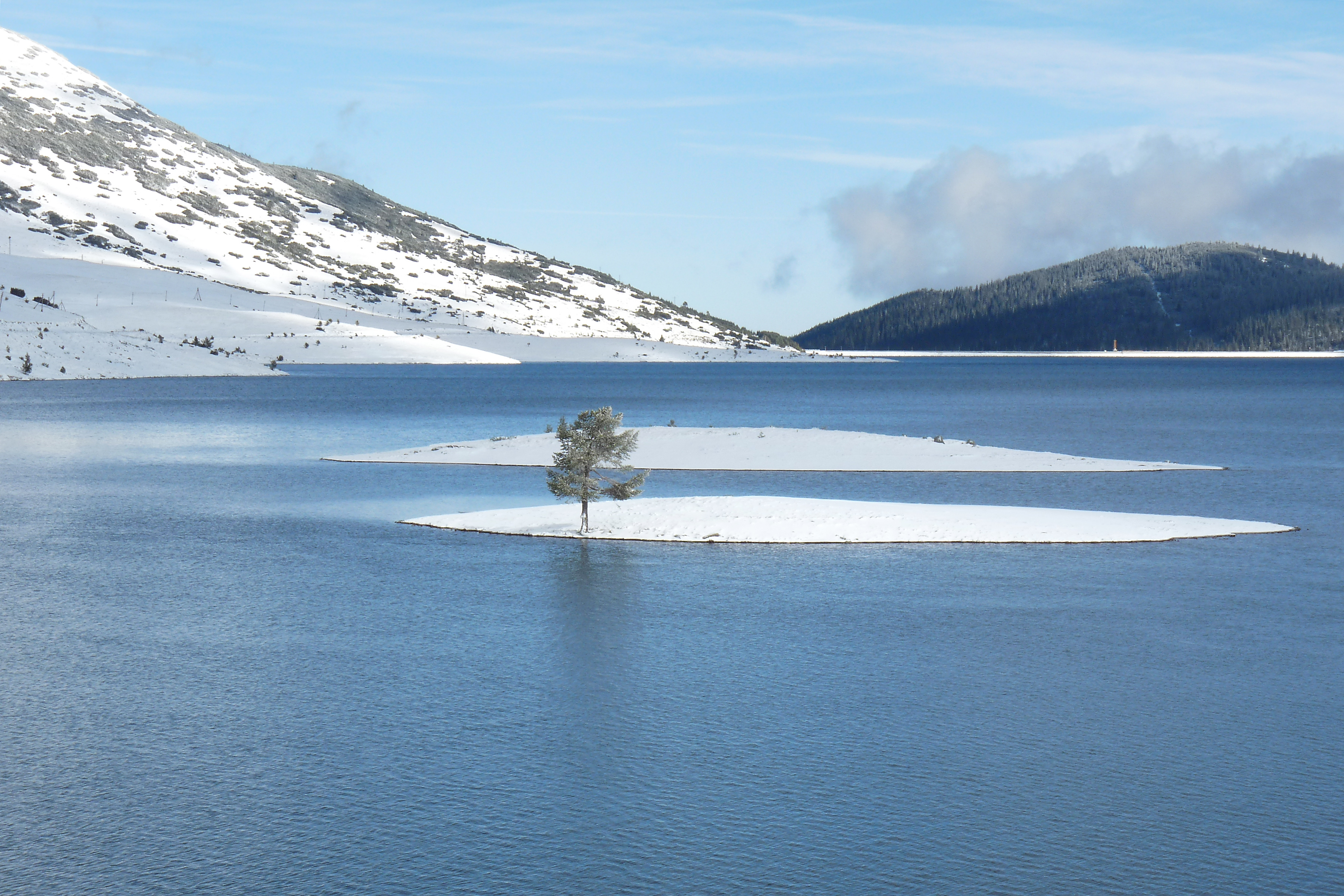
