= Vera Zlatareva =

Bulgarian feminist, author, suffragette and lawyer

- Born: 3 December 1905; Golyamo Belovo, Bulgaria
- Died: 19 August 1977 (aged 71)
- Education: Sofia University
- Occupations: Feminist, author, lawyer and suffragette
- Spouse: Mihail Genovski

Vera Zlatareva (3 December 1905 – 19 August 1977) was a Bulgarian feminist, author, suffragette and lawyer.

== Life ==
Vera Zlatareva was born on 3 December 1905 in the village of Golyamo Belovo, Bulgaria. She attended both middle and high school in Plovdiv and graduated from the Law Department of the Sofia University in 1929. Two years later she received her PhD from the same institution. In 1931–32, she worked for the legal adviser to the Ministry of Agriculture and State Property. From 1932 to 1934, she ran a special section within the Police Department of Plovdiv set up to combat prostitution by decriminalizing it for the women involved, whom she viewed as victims of sexual enslavement, while criminalizing those who provided the demand for prostitution. From July 1934 to July 1936, Zlatareva worked for the Plovdiv Town Council, where she chaired the Social Support Division. She married the politician and lawyer Mihail Genovski in 1936 and they had a son and a daughter together. The family moved to Sofia, the capital of Bulgaria, after the marriage where she began working in her husband's law office from June 1937. Zlatareva was elected to the National Assembly as a member of the Bulgarian Agrarian National Union after the Communist coup d'état in 1944. She died on 19 August 1977.

== Activities ==
Zlatareva began agitating for the right to practice law after her marriage, but she was not successful until equal rights were granted to women after the 1944 coup d'état. She became the first female lawyer in Bulgaria to take advantage of this change.
