= Belovo, Bulgaria =

Belovo Белово
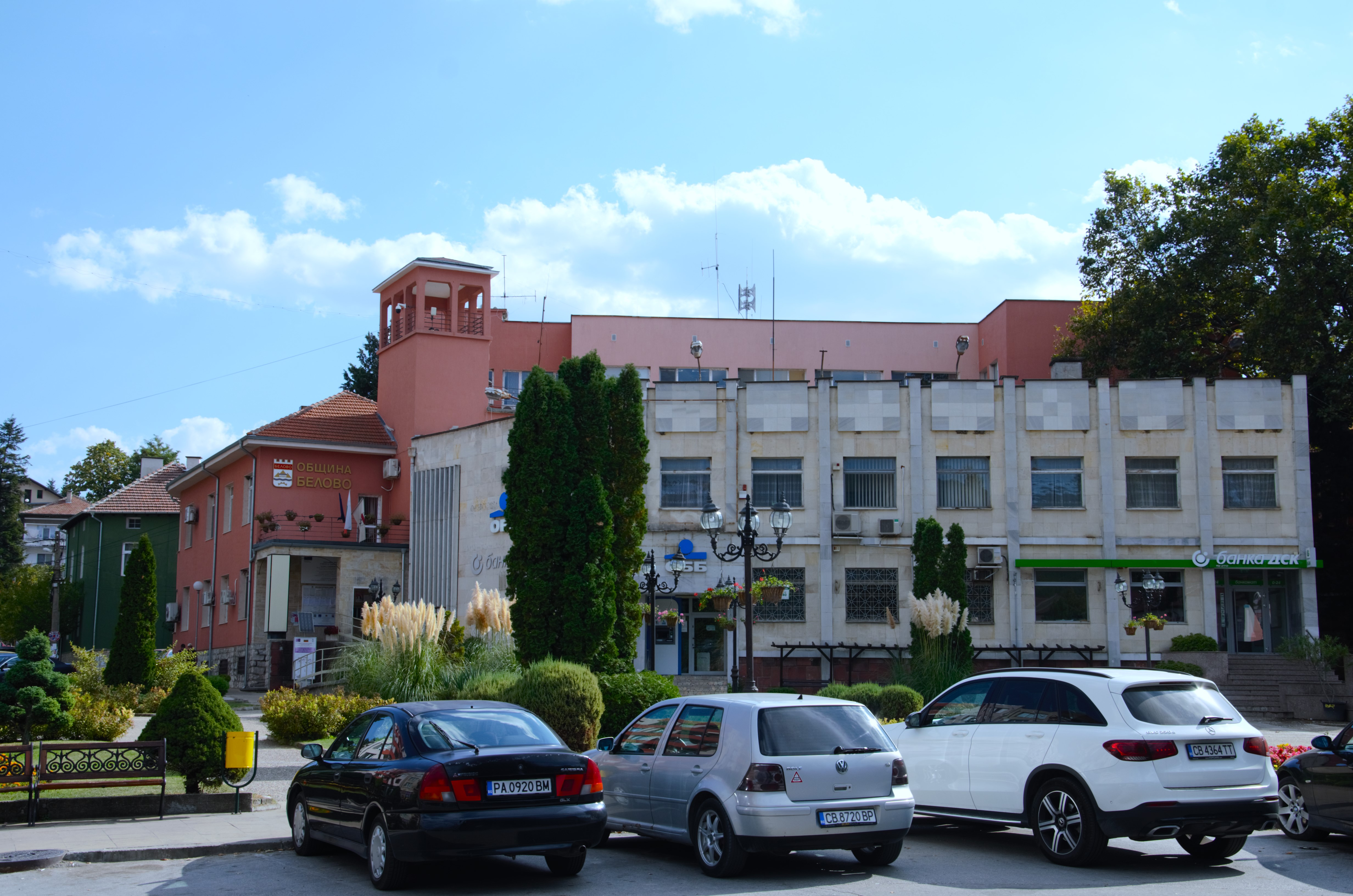
- Belovo Municipal Hall

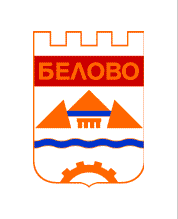
- Coat of arms

- Location of Belovo, Bulgaria
- Coordinates: 42°13′N 24°0′E
- Country: Bulgaria
- Provinces (Oblast): Pazardzhik

Government
  - Mayor: Kostaden Varev
- Elevation: 320 m (1,050 ft)

Population (15.12.2006)
  - Total: 3,966
- Time zone: UTC+2 (EET)
  - Summer (DST): UTC+3 (EEST)
- Postal Code: 4470
- Area code: 03581

Belovo (Bulgarian: Белово [ˈbɛɫovo]) is a town in South West Bulgaria. It is the seat of Belovo Municipality. It is located in Pazardzhik Province, where the Yadenitsa flows into the Maritsa river, at the foot of three mountain ranges (Rila, Rhodopes and Sredna Gora), on the western end of the Thracian Plain.

Belovo town as a municipal center is surrounded by the villages of Akandzhievo, Gabrovitsa, Golyamo Belovo, Dabravite, Menekyovo, Momina Klisura, and Sestrimo.

With the construction of the railway line Istanbul — Belovo by Baron Hirsch's company in 1873, Belovo became the most important center of wood and wood processing in the Balkans during the 19th century. Today the international road and the railway from West Europe through Belgrade and Sofia to Istanbul are passing through the town. The Belovo paper mill produces toilet paper and other disposable paper products.

== International relations ==
=== Twin towns — Sister cities ===
Belovo is twinned with:

- Skotoussa, Greece
- Nevinnomyssk, Russia
