= Ekaterina Zlatareva =

Bulgarian actress

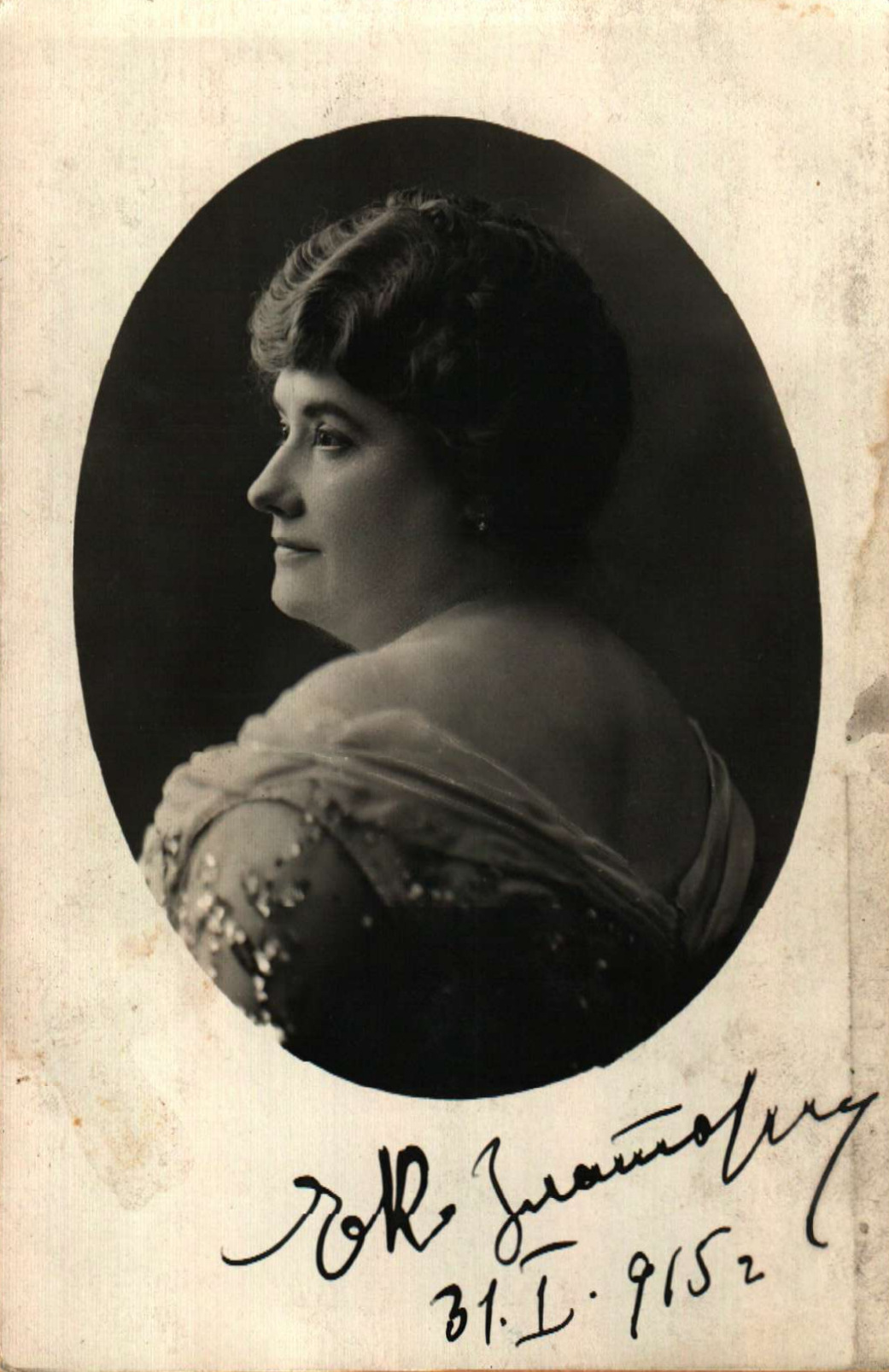
- A portrait photo of Ekatrina Zlatareva in 1915
- Born: Екатерина Христова Златарева; 1868; Kazanlak, Bulgaria
- Died: 11 January 1924 (aged 56); Sofia, Bulgaria

Ekaterina Hristova Zlatareva (1868–1924) was a Bulgarian actress.

== Biography ==
Ekaterina Zlatareva is born in Kazanlak, Stara Zagora Province, Bulgaria in 1868. During 1887 she graduated from high school in Varna. Her first acting debut was in 1890 with the role of Todorka in a theatrical play named "Ivanko" (Bulgarian: Иванко) by Vasil Drumev in the theater "Osnova". During 1890 – 1892, she participates in the "Capital Dramatic Opera Company", which performs many acts in front of large audiences.

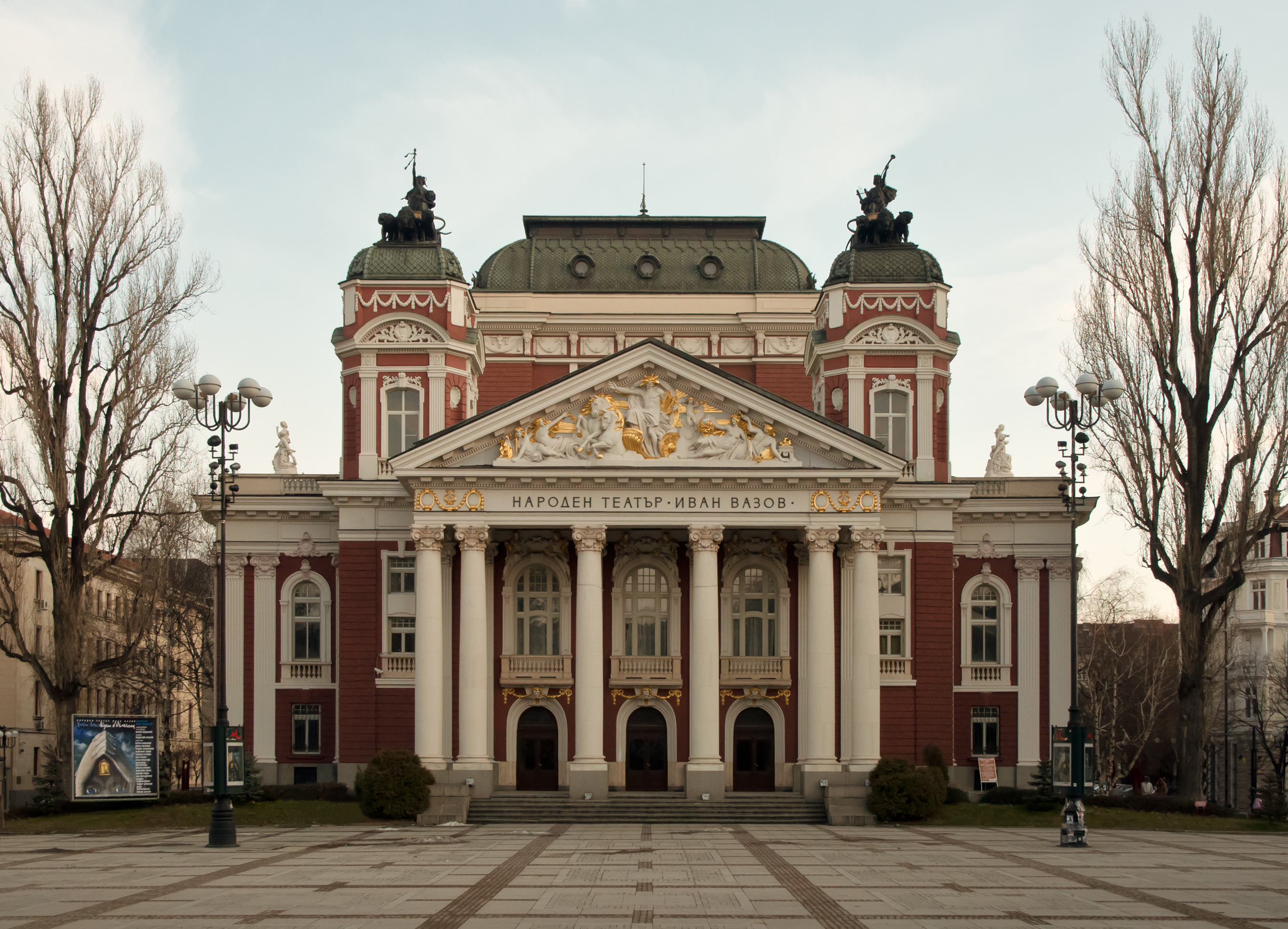
Ivan Vazov National Theater in Sofia

From 1892 until 1904, Zlatareva performed in the new Dramatic Theater "Salza i Smyah" in Sofia. From 1904 to 1923 she plays on the scene of the National Theater in Sofia – "Ivan Vazov", the oldest and most authoritative theater in the country.

She was active as an actress in the years between 1890 and 1924.

Ekaterina Zlatareva died on 11 January 1927.

== Major roles in theater ==
- Ana Andreevna – „Revizor" of Nikolai Gogol;
- Androfoba – „Mazhemrazka of Stefan Kostov;
- Mrs Dulska – „The Morality of Mrs. Dulska" на Gabriela Zapolska;
- Kostanda – „Svekarva" by Anton Strashimirov;
- Malama – „Vampire" by Anton Strashimirov;
- Matryona– „The Power of Darkness" by Leo Tolstoy;
- Granny Froshar – „The two elders";
- Todorka – „Ivanko" by Vasil Drumev

== Gallery ==
Photos of Ekaterina Zlatareva in different theater roles

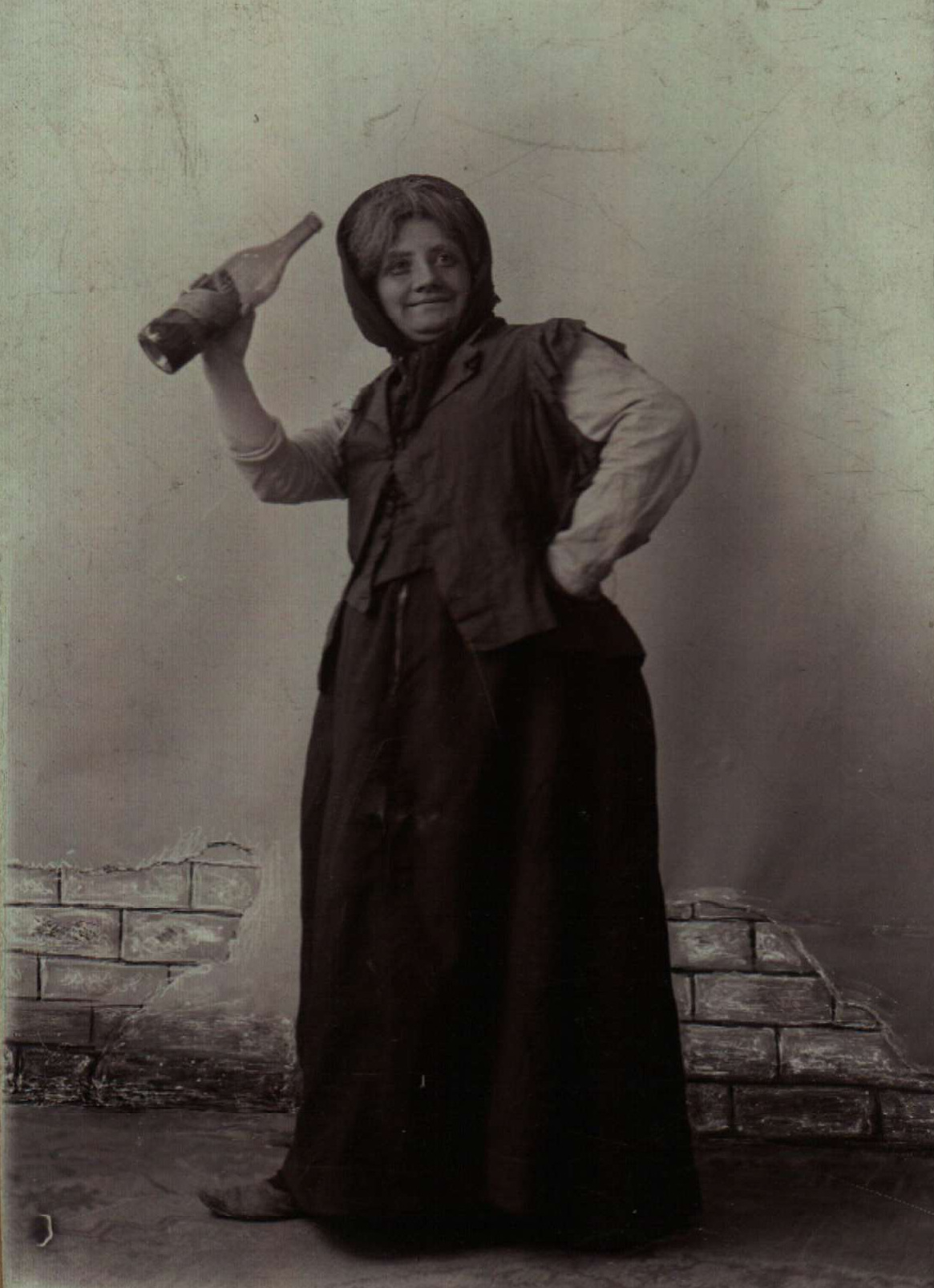
in the Role of Froshar, 1902.

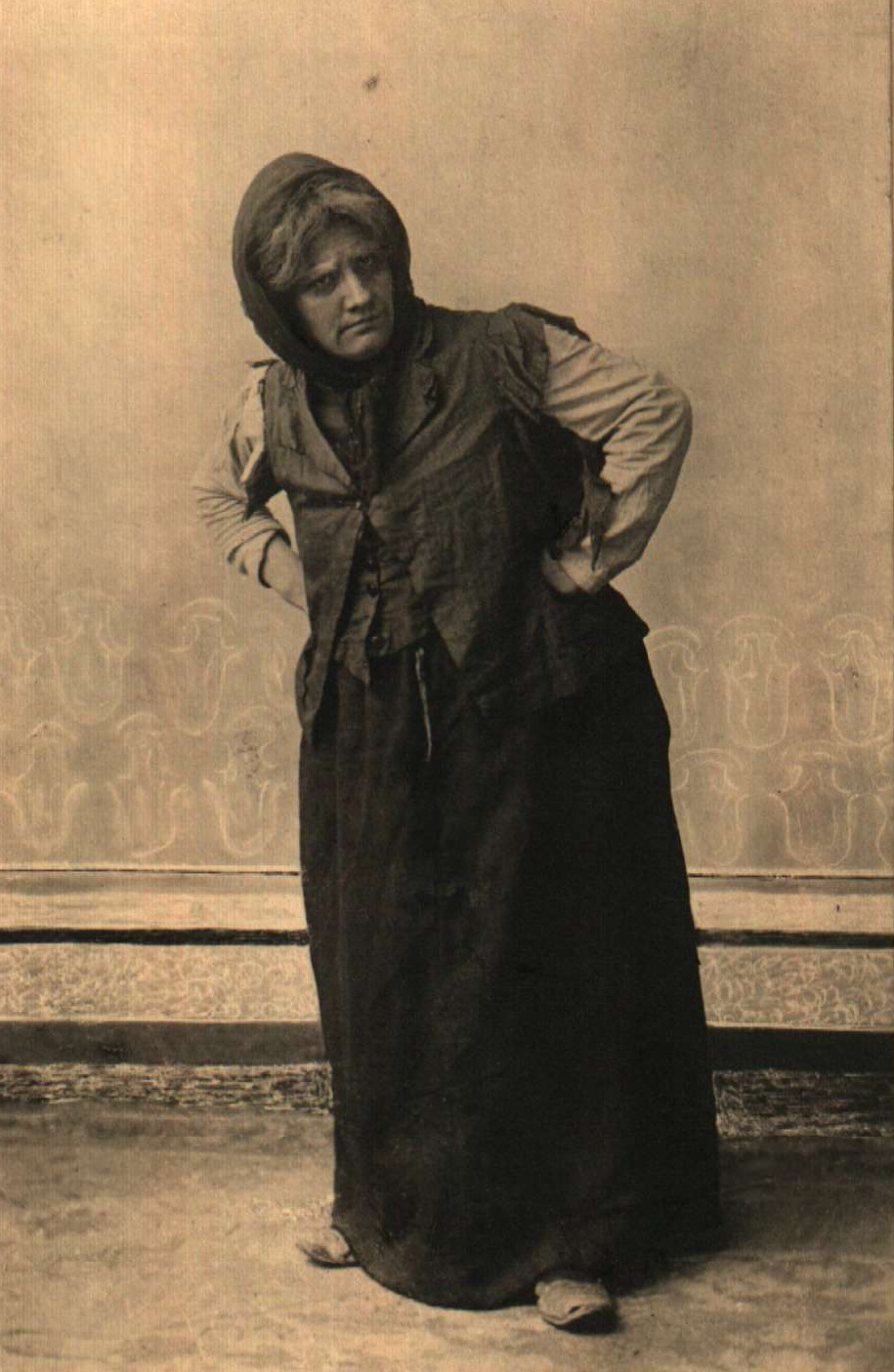
In The Role of Froshar.

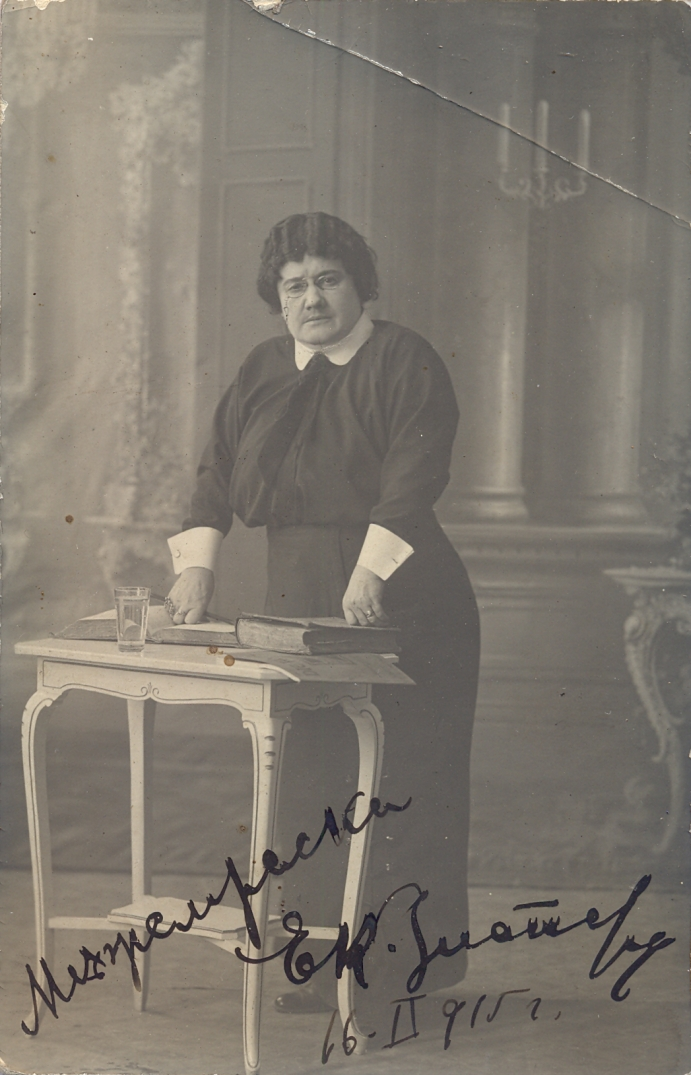
In the role of Androfoba, 1915

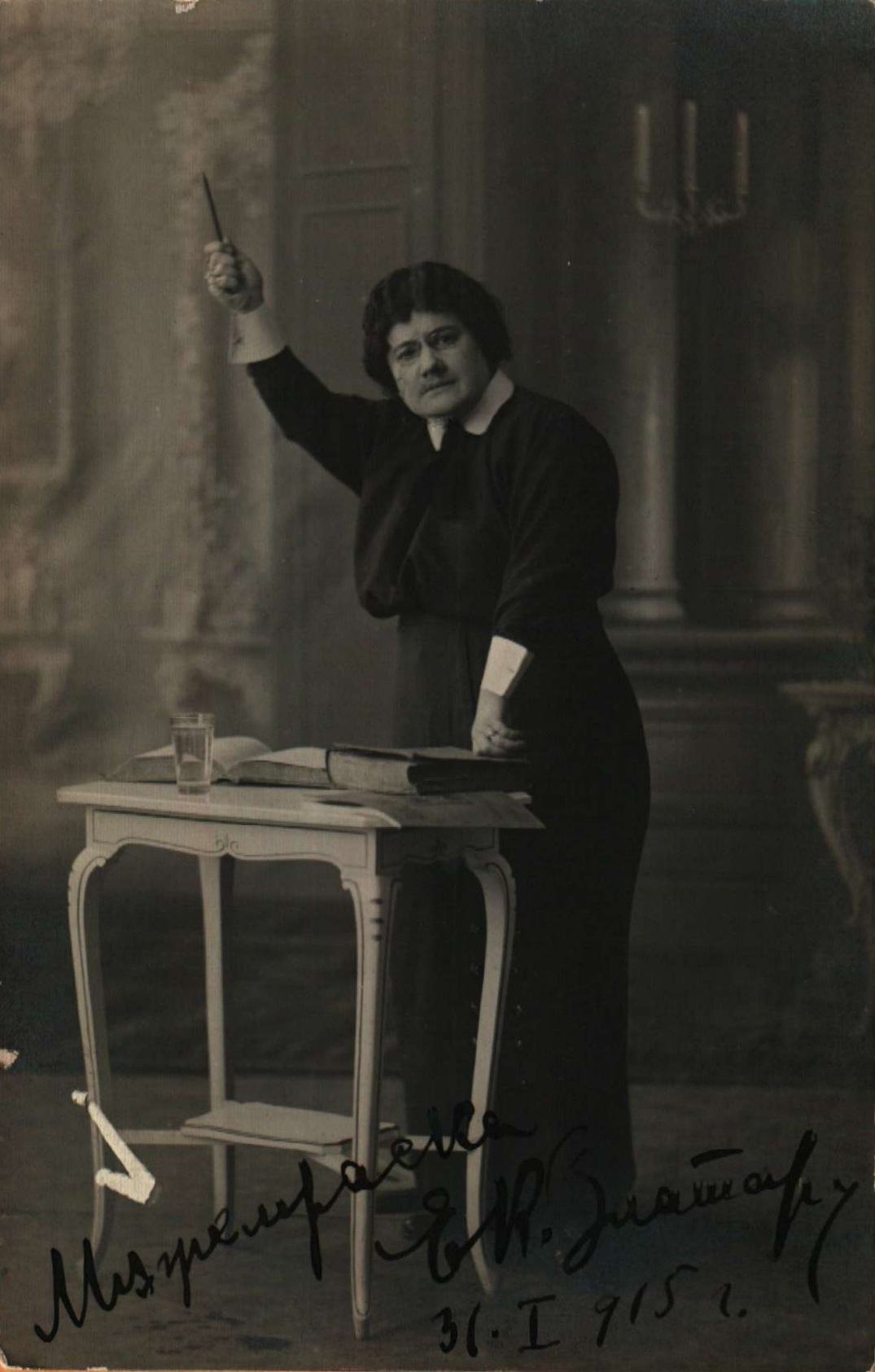
In the role of Androfoba, 1915

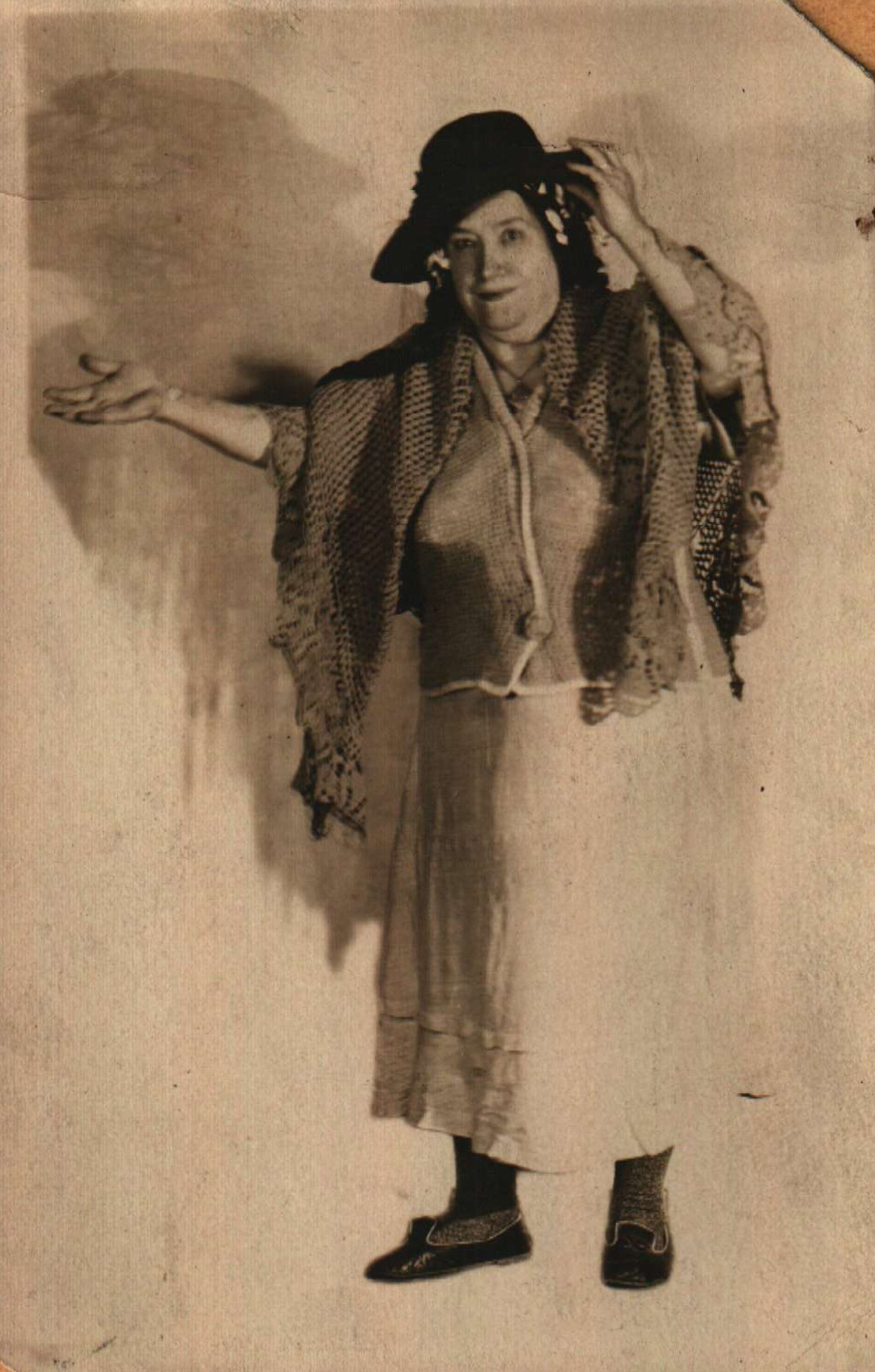
In the role of Mrs. Durska, 1915

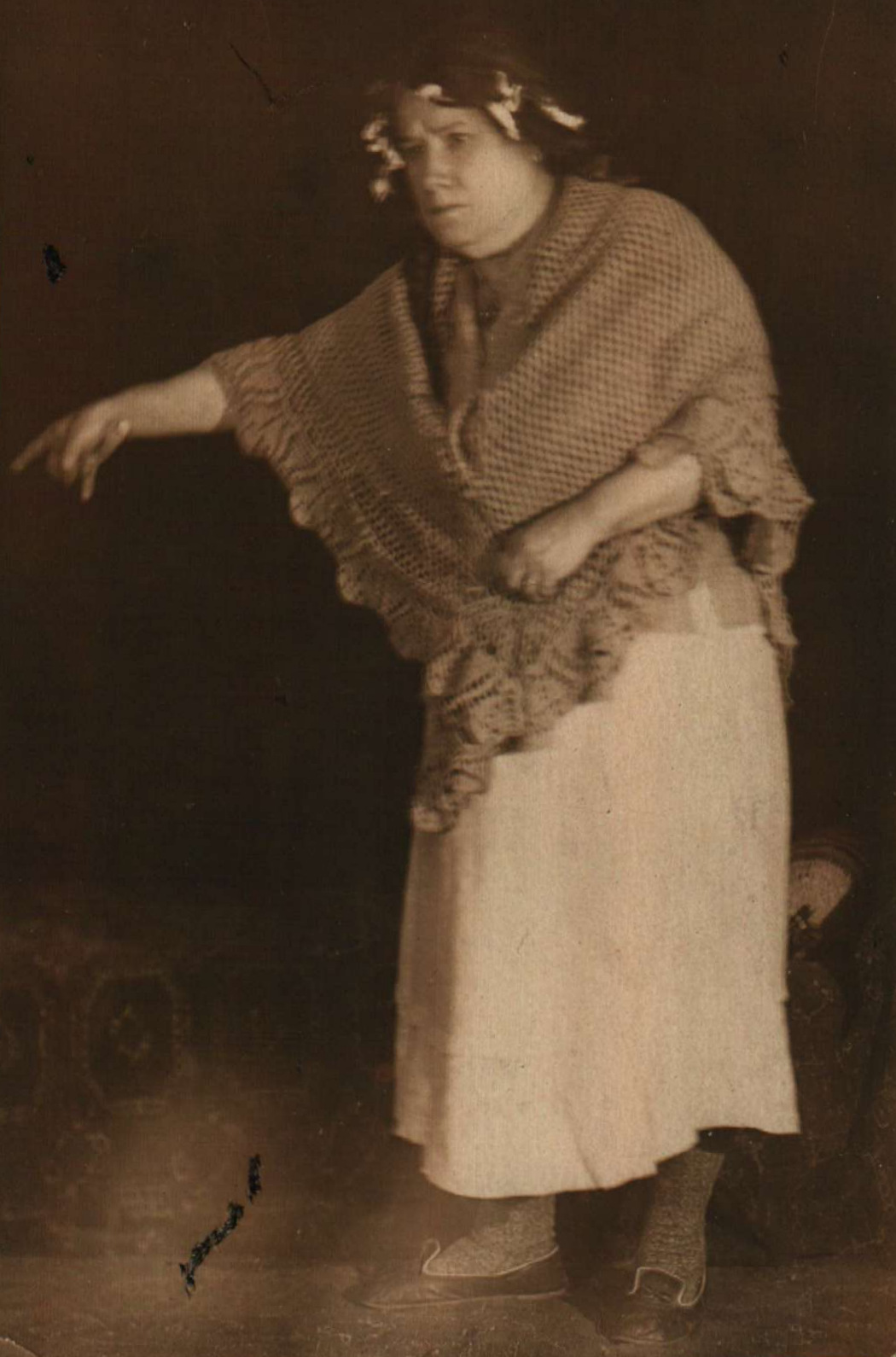
In the role of Mrs. Durska, 1915

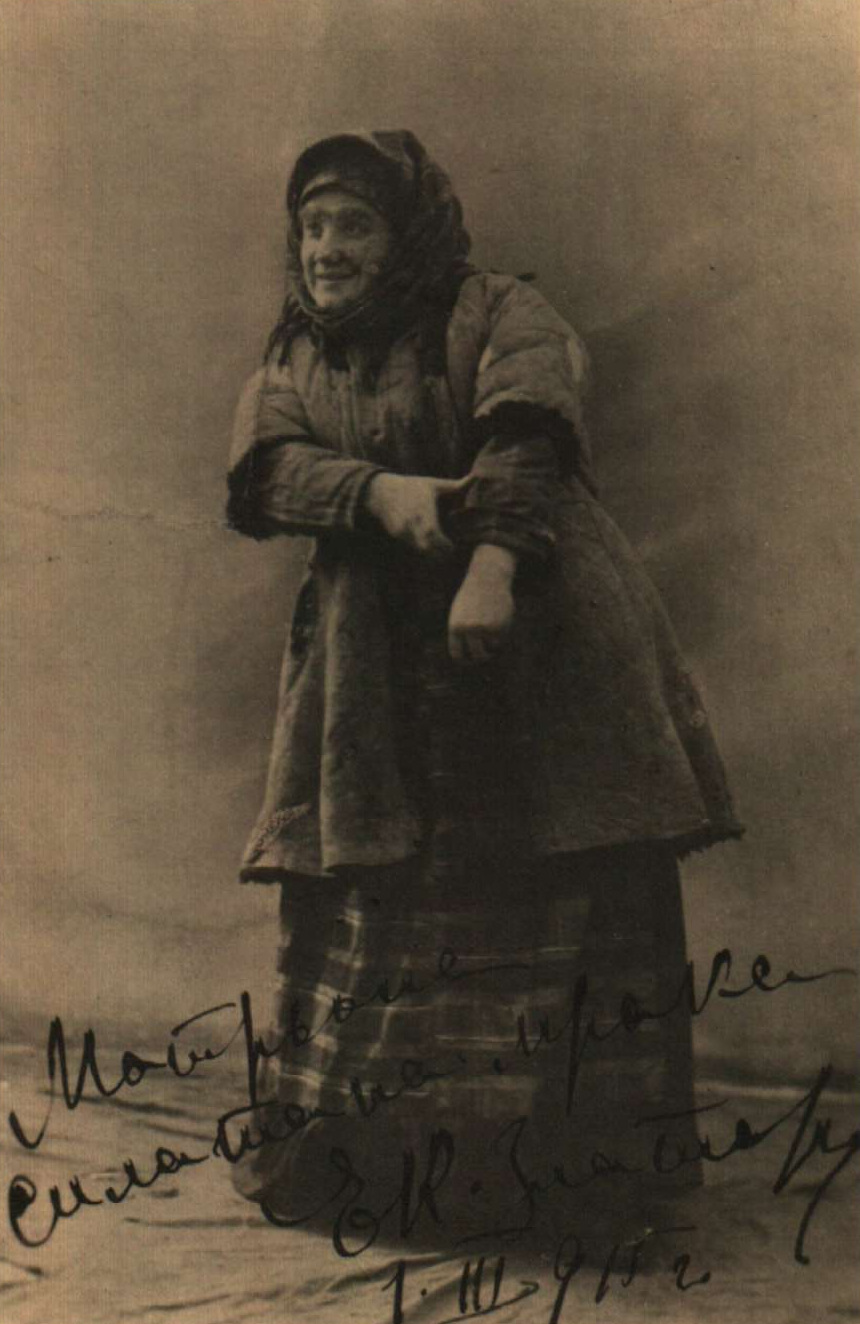
In the role of Matryona, 1915
