= Sestrimo Hydro Power Plant =

Hydroelectric power station in Bulgaria

- Country: Bulgaria
- Location: Sestrimo
- Coordinates: 42°12′28″N 23°54′56″E
- Status: Operational
- Commission date: 1973
- Owner: NEK EAD
- Operator: NEK EAD

Thermal power station
- Primary fuel: Hydropower

Power generation
- Units operational: 3
- Nameplate capacity: 240 MW

The Sestrimo Hydro Power Plant is an active hydro power project in the eastern Rila mountains near Sestrimo village, Bulgaria. Water is supplied by the Belmeken Dam to three turbines with a nominal output of around 80 MW which will deliver up to 240 MW of power. It is part of the Belmeken–Sestrimo–Chaira Hydropower Cascade. The same reservoir is used for pumped storage with the Chaira Hydro Power Plant.
