= Momina Klisura Hydroelectric Power Station =

Hydroelectric power plant in Bulgaria

- Country: Bulgaria
- Location: Momina Klisura
- Coordinates: 42°13′55″N 23°56′58″E
- Status: Operational
- Commission date: 1975
- Owner: NEK EAD
- Operator: NEK EAD

Thermal power station
- Primary fuel: Hydropower

Power generation
- Units operational: 2
- Nameplate capacity: 120 MW

The Momina Klisura Hydro Power Plant is an active hydroelectric power plant in the eastern Rila mountains, located at the Maritsa river near Momina Klisura village, Bulgaria. It has 2 individual turbines with a nominal output of around 60 MW which will deliver up to 120 MW of power. It is the final stage of the Belmeken–Sestrimo–Chaira Hydropower Cascade.
