= Belmeken Hydro Power Plant =

Hydroelectric power plant in Bulgaria

- Location: Belmeken
- Coordinates: 42°11′58″N 23°51′30″E
- Status: Operational
- Owner(s): NEK EAD

Power Station
- Pumps: 2
- Installed capacity: 375 MW (503,000 hp)

The Belmeken Hydro Power Plant is an active pumped storage hydro power project in the eastern Rila mountains, Bulgaria. It receives its water from the Belmeken Reservoir and has 5 individual turbines with a nominal output of around 75 megawatts (101,000 hp) which can deliver up to 375 megawatts (503,000 hp) of power, as well as 2 pumps with an installed capacity of 104 MW. It is part of the Belmeken–Sestrimo–Chaira Hydropower Cascade.
