= Belovo Municipality =

- Municipality
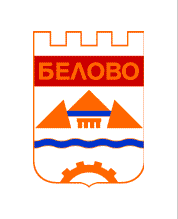
- Coat of arms

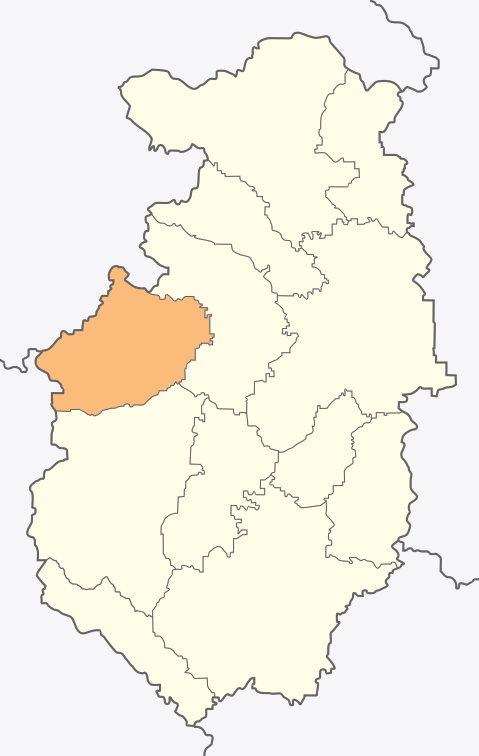
- Location of Belovo Municipality in Pazardzhik Province

- Location of Belovo Municipality in Bulgaria
- Coordinates: 42°12′01″N 24°01′01″E
- Country: Bulgaria
- Province: Pazardzhik Province
- Capital: Belovo

Area
  - Total: 346.36 km^{2} (133.73 sq mi)

Population (2011)
  - Total: 8,891
  - Density: 25.67/km^{2} (66.48/sq mi)
- Postal code: 4470
- Area code: 03581

Belovo Municipality (Bulgarian: Община Белово) is a municipality in the Pazardzhik Province of Bulgaria.

== Demography ==
Ethnic composition of Belovo Municipality
1. Bulgarians (93.0%)
2. Gypsies/Romani (4.21%)
3. No identification (2.30%)
4. Other (0.56%)

At the 2011 census, the population of Belovo was 8,891. Most of the inhabitants (93.04%) were Bulgarians, and there was a minority of Gypsies/Romani(4.21%). 2.3% of the population's ethnicity was unknown.

== Communities ==
=== Towns ===
- Belovo

=== Villages ===
- Akandzhievo
- Dabravite
- Gabrovitsa
- Golyamo Belovo
- Menekyovo
- Momina Klisura
- Sestrimo
