= Chaira Hydro Power Plant =

Hydroelectric power plant in Bulgaria

Chaira Pumped Storage Hydro Power Plant
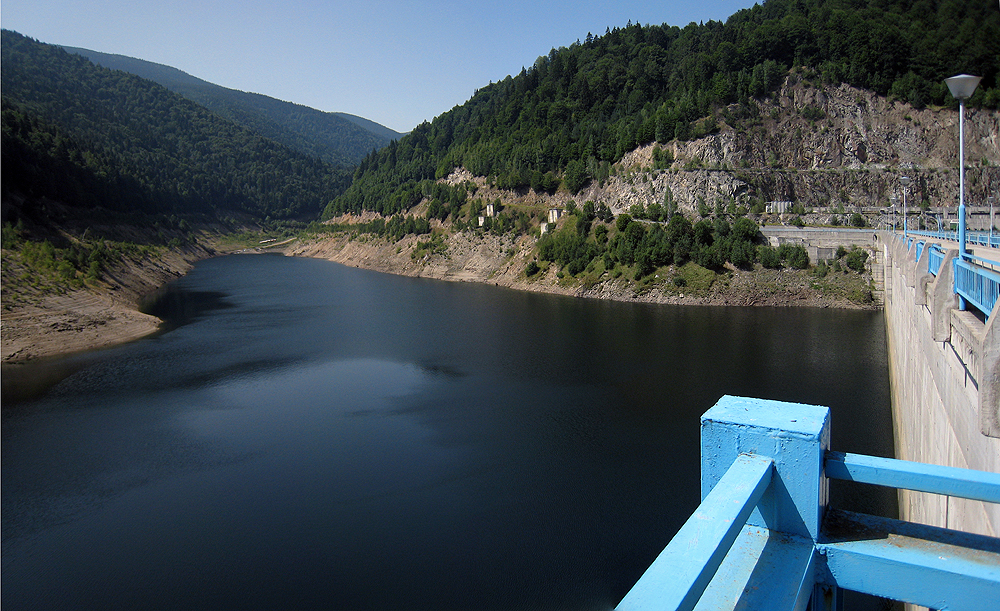
- Belmeken Dam
- Country: Bulgaria
- Location: Pazardzhik Province
- Coordinates: 42°9′32″N 23°52′15″E
- Status: Not operational since April 2022 following turbine failure in Unit 4
- Opening date: 1995 (units 1 and 2); 1999 (units 3 and 4)
- Owner(s): NEK EAD

Reservoir
- Creates: Belmeken reservoir

Power Station
- Installed capacity: 864 MW

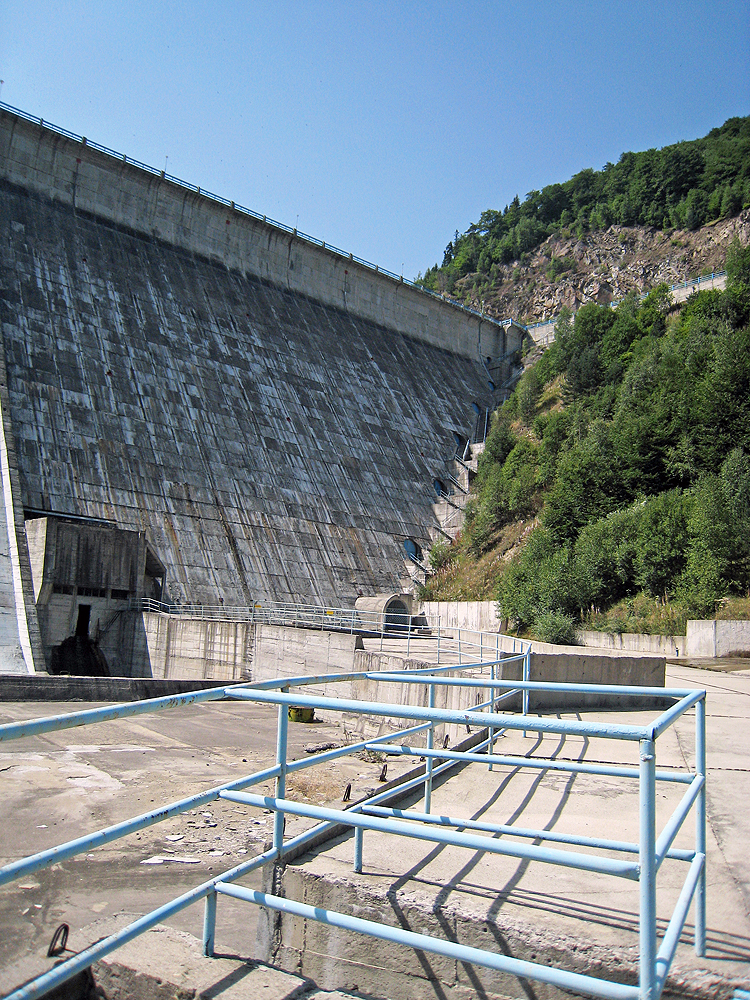
Wall of Chaira Hydro Power Plant

The Chaira Pumped Storage Hydro Power Plant (Chaira PSHPP) was built in the Rila mountain range, about 100 kilometres (62 mi) southeast of Bulgaria's capital city, Sofia. Part of the major Belmeken–Sestrimo–Chaira Hydropower Cascade, Chaira has generating capacity of 864 megawatts (1,159,000 hp) and a pumping capacity of 788 megawatts (1,057,000 hp). The power plant is equipped with four reversible Francis pump-turbines, each rated at 216 megawatts (290,000 hp) in the generating mode, and 197 megawatts (264,000 hp) in pumping mode. Units 1 and 2 have been in operation since 1995, and at that time Chaira was the largest pumped-storage plant in southeast Europe with the highest head in the world for a single-stage pump turbine (690 metres (2,260 ft) generating and 701 metres (2,300 ft) pumping). Units 3 and 4 came online in 1999. The pump-turbines and motor-generators were supplied by Toshiba, and three of them were manufactured under Japanese supervision in Bulgaria. The upper basin for Chaira is formed by the Belmeken Dam which connects to the pumped storage plant by two headrace tunnels with a diameter of 4.2 metres (14 ft) and two penstocks with diameter 4.4 metres (14 ft), reducing to 4.2 metres (14 ft). Outflow from the Belmeken reservoir supplies the Sestrimo Hydro Power Plant
