= Golyamo Belovo =

Golyamo Belovo Голямо Белово
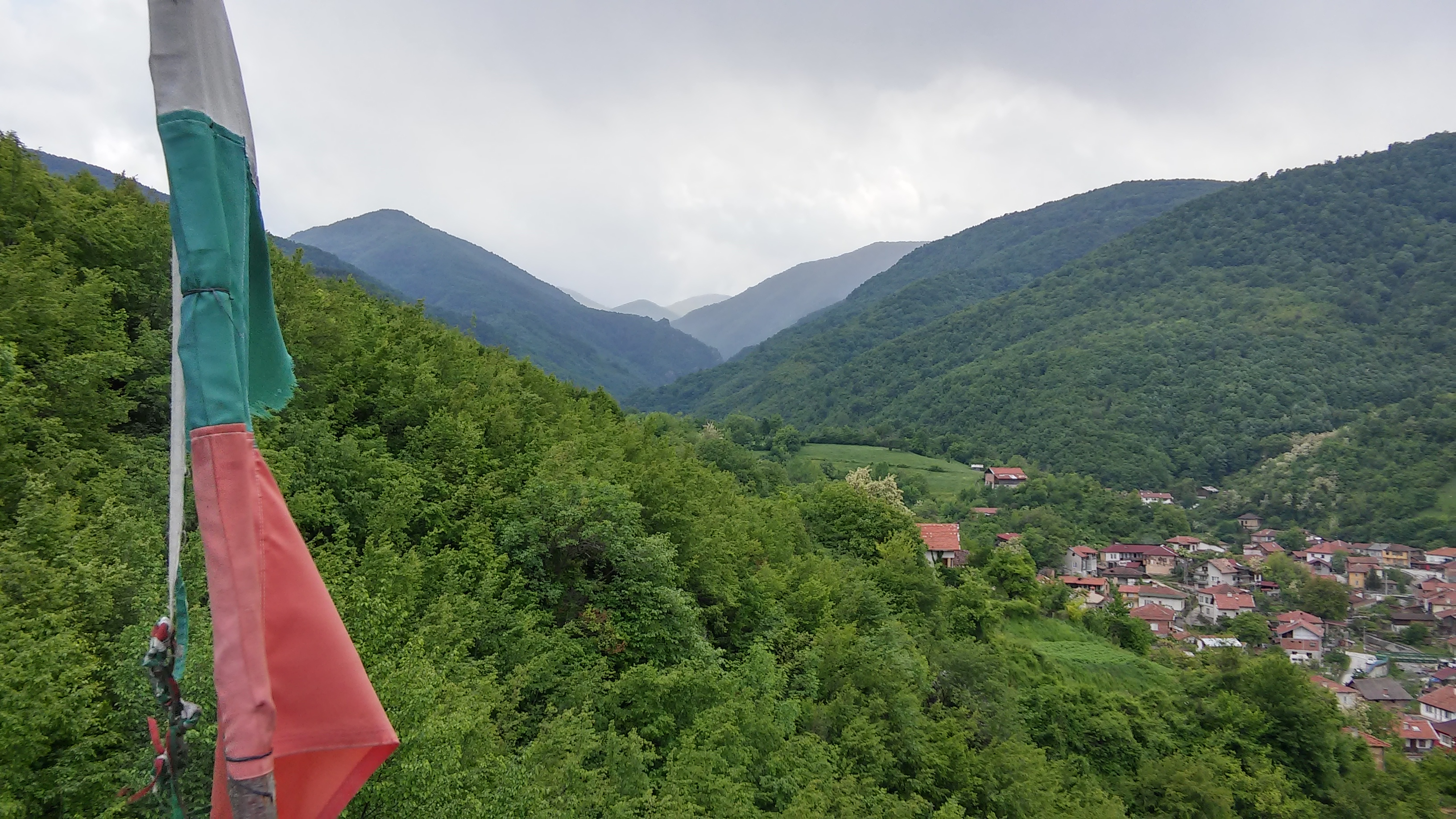

- Location of Golyamo Belovo, Bulgaria
- Coordinates: 42°11′N 23°59′E
- Country: Bulgaria
- Provinces (Oblast): Pazardzhik Province

Government
  - Mayor: Rositsa Dankova
- Elevation: 411 m (1,348 ft)

Population (01.01.2007)
  - Total: 572
- Time zone: UTC+2 (EET)
  - Summer (DST): UTC+3 (EEST)
- Postal Code: 4473
- Area codes: 03581 from Bulgaria, 003593581 from outside

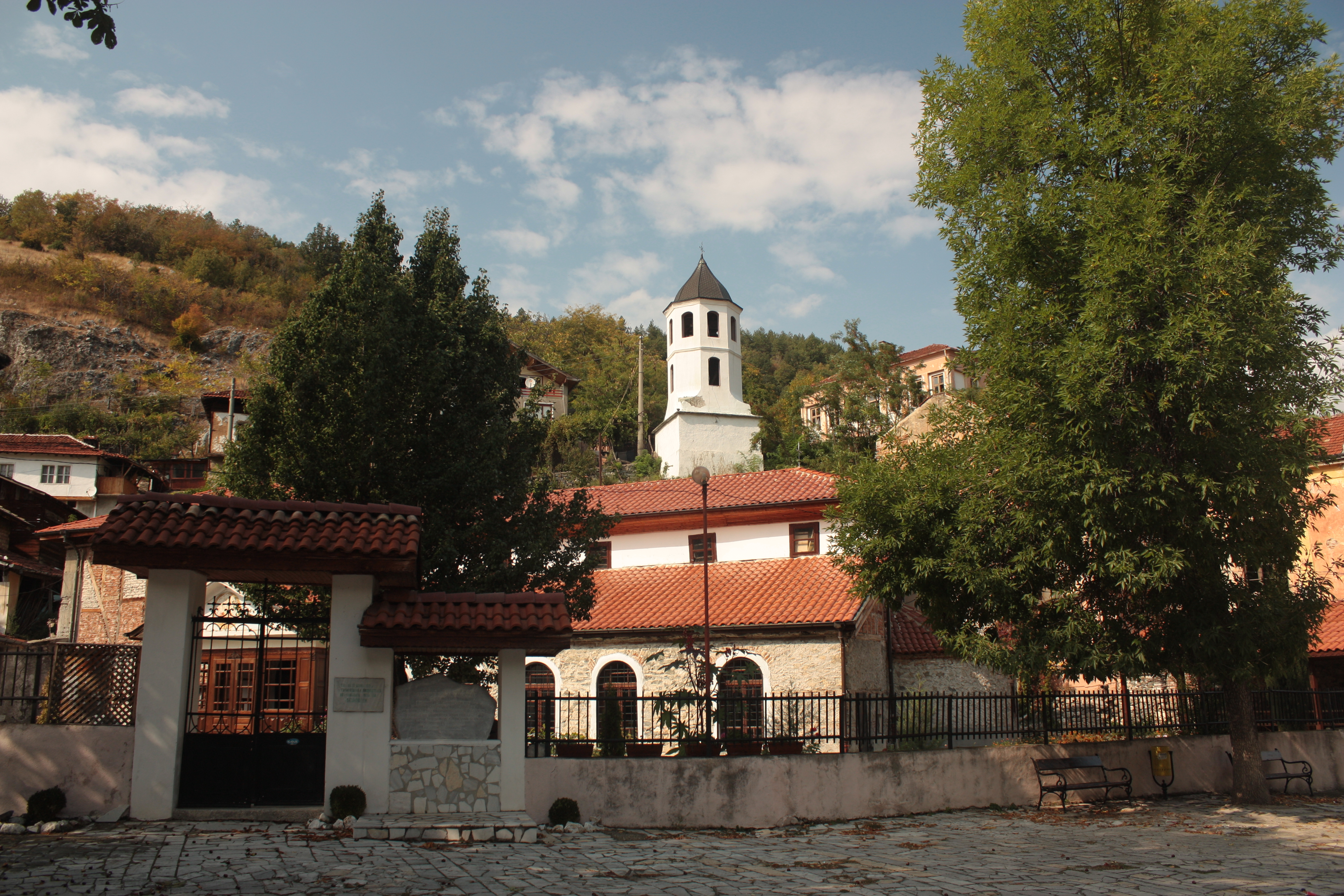
St. George church in Golyamo Belovo

Golyamo Belovo (Bulgarian: Голямо Белово) is a village in Southern Bulgaria. It is located in the Pazardzhik Province. It is part of Belovo Municipality. The village is situated along the river Yadenitsa, at the foot of three mountain ranges: Rila, Rhodopes and Sredna Gora.
