= Dospat (river) =

Dospat (Доспат, Δεσπάτης)
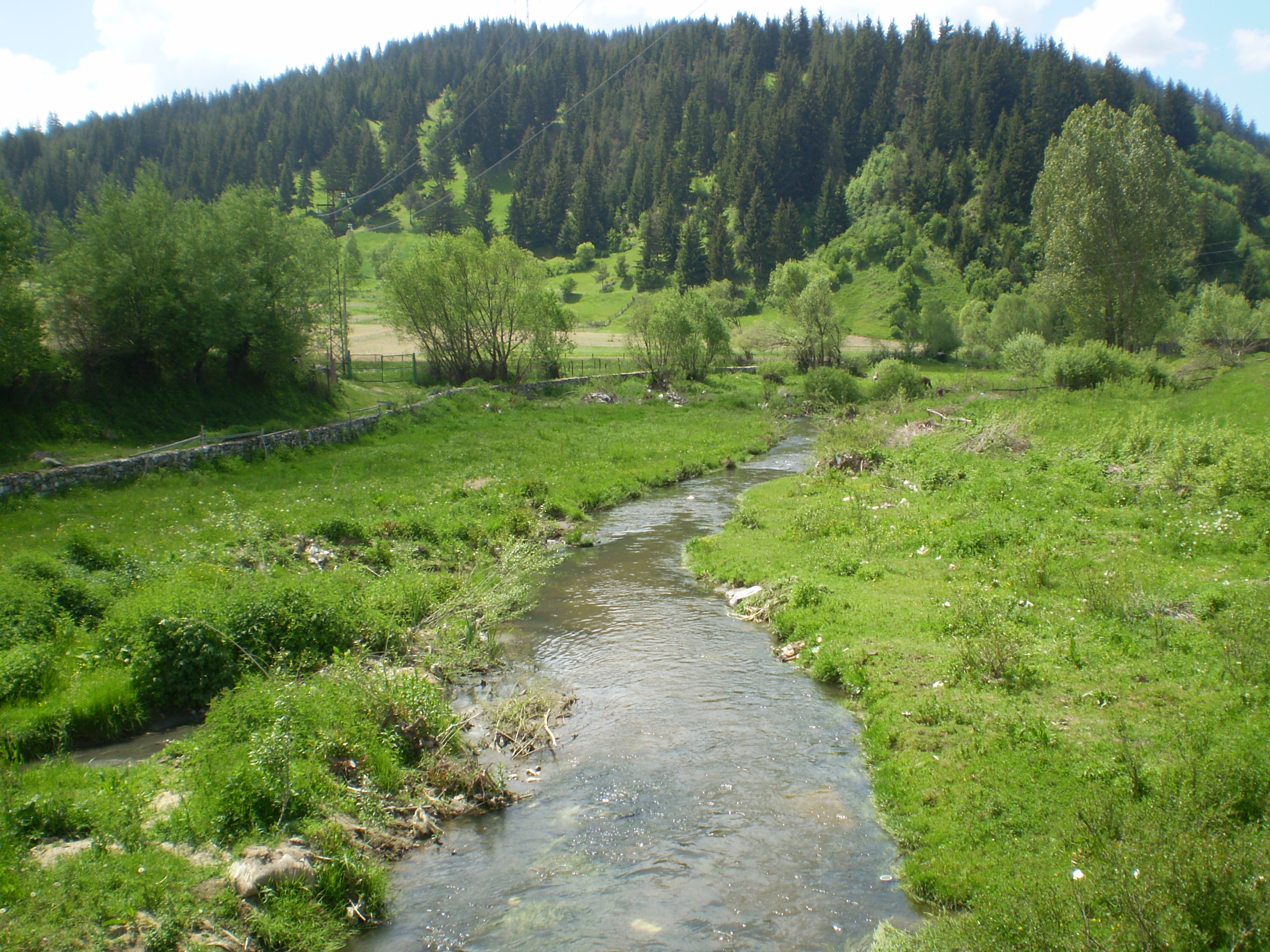
- The Dospat at Barutin

Location
- Countries: Bulgaria and Greece

Physical characteristics
- Source
  - location: Rhodope Mountains
  - elevation: 1,610 m (5,280 ft)
- Mouth
  - location: Mesta/Nestos
  - coordinates: 41°23′25″N 24°5′15″E
  - elevation: 366 m (1,201 ft)
- Length: 110 km (68 mi)
- Basin size: 633.5 km^{2} (244.6 sq mi)

Basin features
- Progression: Nestos→ Aegean Sea
- Tributaries
  - left: Sarnena
  - right: Kochan, Osina

The Dospat (Bulgarian: Доспат; Greek: Δεσπάτης, Despatis) is a river in the western Rhodope Mountains, a left tributary of the Mesta. It is situated in Bulgaria and Greece. Reaching a length of 110 km, of which 96 km are in Bulgaria, the river is the Mesta's largest tributary.

== Geography ==
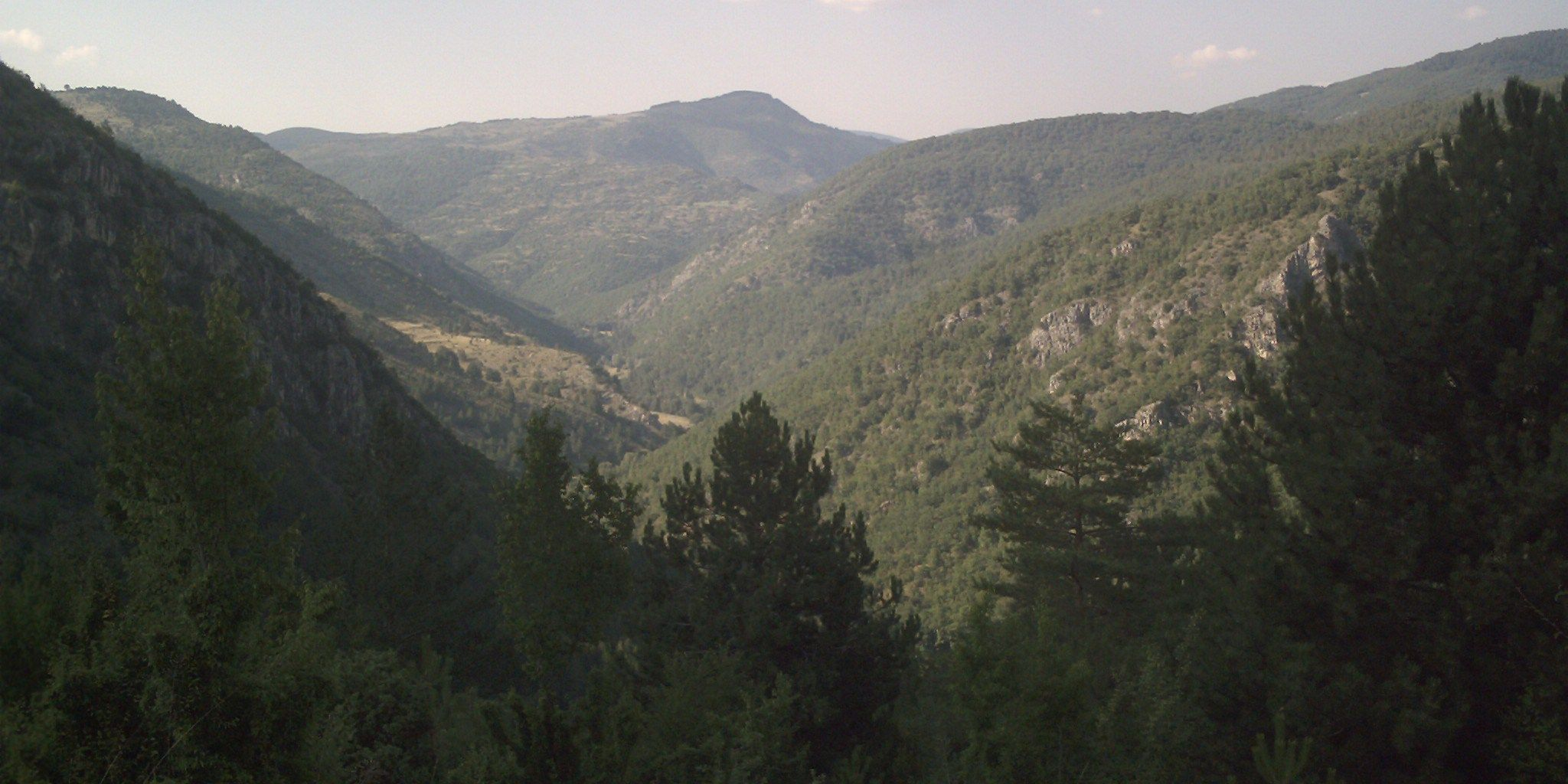
The valley of the Dospat at Tuhovishta, Bulgaria

The Dospat springs at an altitude of 1,610 m some 800 m southwest of the summit of Gyultepe (1,643 m) in the Veliyshko-Videnishki Ridge of the western Rhodope Mountains. It flows south for about 6–7 km and then turns southeast, reaching the tip of the Dospat Reservoir at the town of Sarnitsa. In that section the riverbed is 6–8 m wide; the valley is 1.5–2 km; the depth of the river is 1–1.5 m. After leaving the reservoir at its dam, the river turns south, flows through a short narrow gorge and enters the small Barutin Valley, where it receives its largest tributary the Sarnena reka (39 km). After the confluence with the Sarnena reka, the Dospat bends southwest and enters a narrow gorge with steep bare slopes. At the road junction for the villages of Tsrancha and Brashten the river turns west, in 3 km bends northwest and at the confluence with the Osinska reka takes a sharp turn south. From that point its valley resembles a gorge. About a kilometer after receiving its tributary the Kochanska reka, the Dospat reaches the Bulgaria–Greece border and forms the frontier between the two countries for some 2 km. At 1.6 km from the village of Tuhovishta it enters entirely the territory of Greece. It flows into the Mesta at an altitude of 366 m less than a kilometer from the village of Potamoi.

Its drainage basin covers a territory of 633.5 km^{2} on the territory of Bulgaria, or 22.9% of the Mesta's total. It borders the drainage basins of the left tributaries of the Mesta the Chechka Bistritsa, Kanina and Zlataritsa to the southwest and west; the Chepinska reka of the Maritsa drainage to the north; the Vacha of the Maritsa drainage to the northeast and east; and several small tributaries of the Mesta to the southeast.

The water feed of the Dospat is distributed as follows: underground water — 37%, rain — 33% and snow — 30%. High water is in December–March and low water is in August. The average annual discharge at the village of Barutin is 5.21 m^{3}/s.

== Settlements and economy ==
The river flows in Pazardzhik and Smolyan Provinces of Bulgaria and Eastern Macedonia and Thrace region of Greece. There are two towns and three villages along the Dospat in Bulgaria, and one village in Greece — Medeni Polyani, Pobit Kamak and Sarnitsa (town) in Sarnitsa Municipality of Pazardzhik Province, Dospat (town) and Barutin in Dospat Municipality of Smolyan Province, and Potamoi in Kato Nevrokopi in Greece. Its waters are utilized in part in the Dospat–Vacha Hydropower Cascade (500 MW), brought via a system of derivations from the Dospat Reservoir to the Teshel Hydro Power Plant in the neighbouring Vacha river basin, as well as in the Batak Hydropower Cascade (254 MW), being transferred to the Shiroka Polyana Reservoir.

There two main roads along its valley, an 18.3 km stretch of the second class II-37 road Yablanitsa–Panagyurishte–Pazardzhik–Barutin between the junction for Sarnitsa and Barutin, and a 26.9 km section of the third class III-843 road Velingrad–Sarnitsa–Dospat between Pobit Kamak and the junction with the II-37.

== Gallery ==
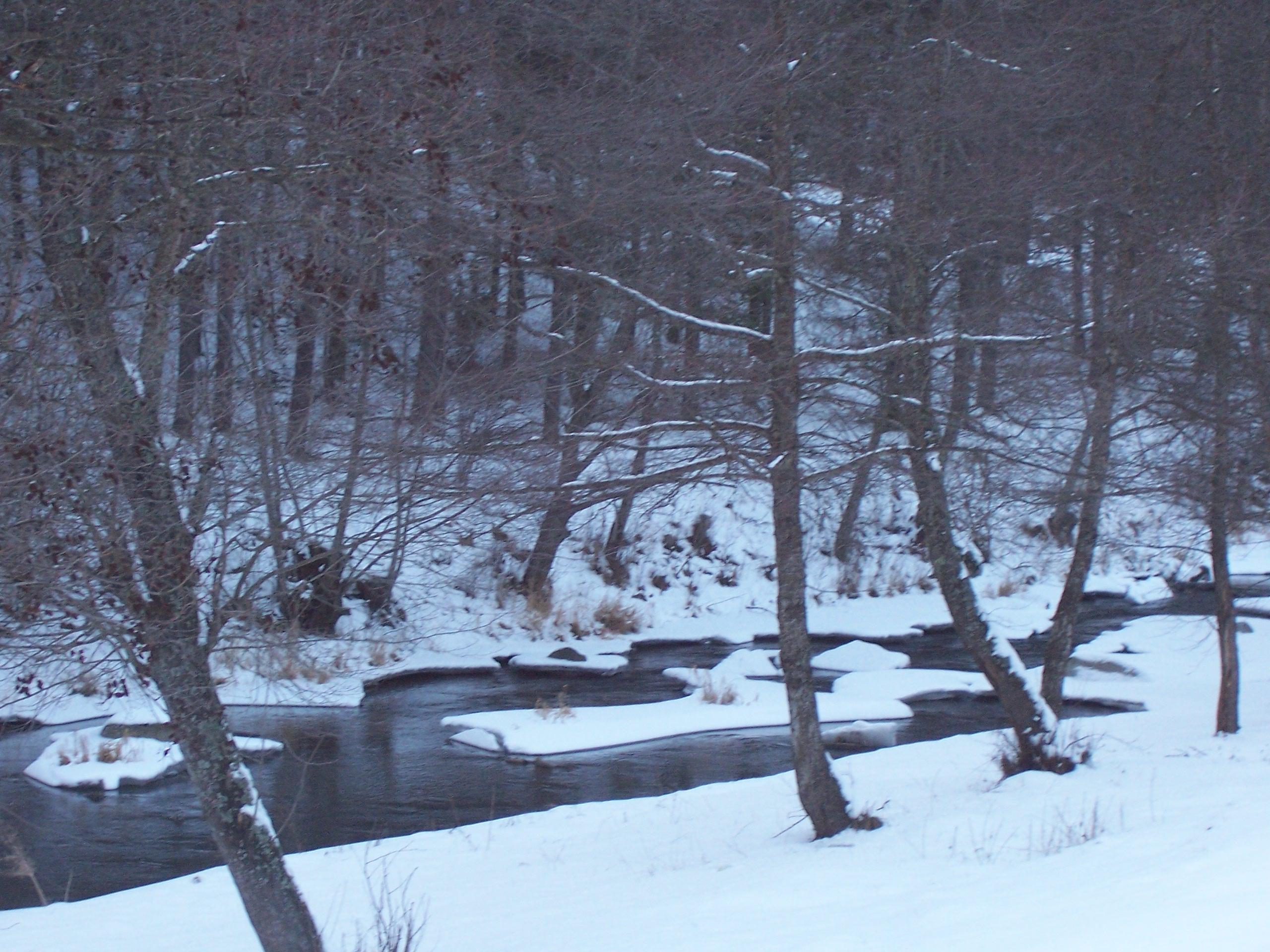
Upper course in winter, Bulgaria

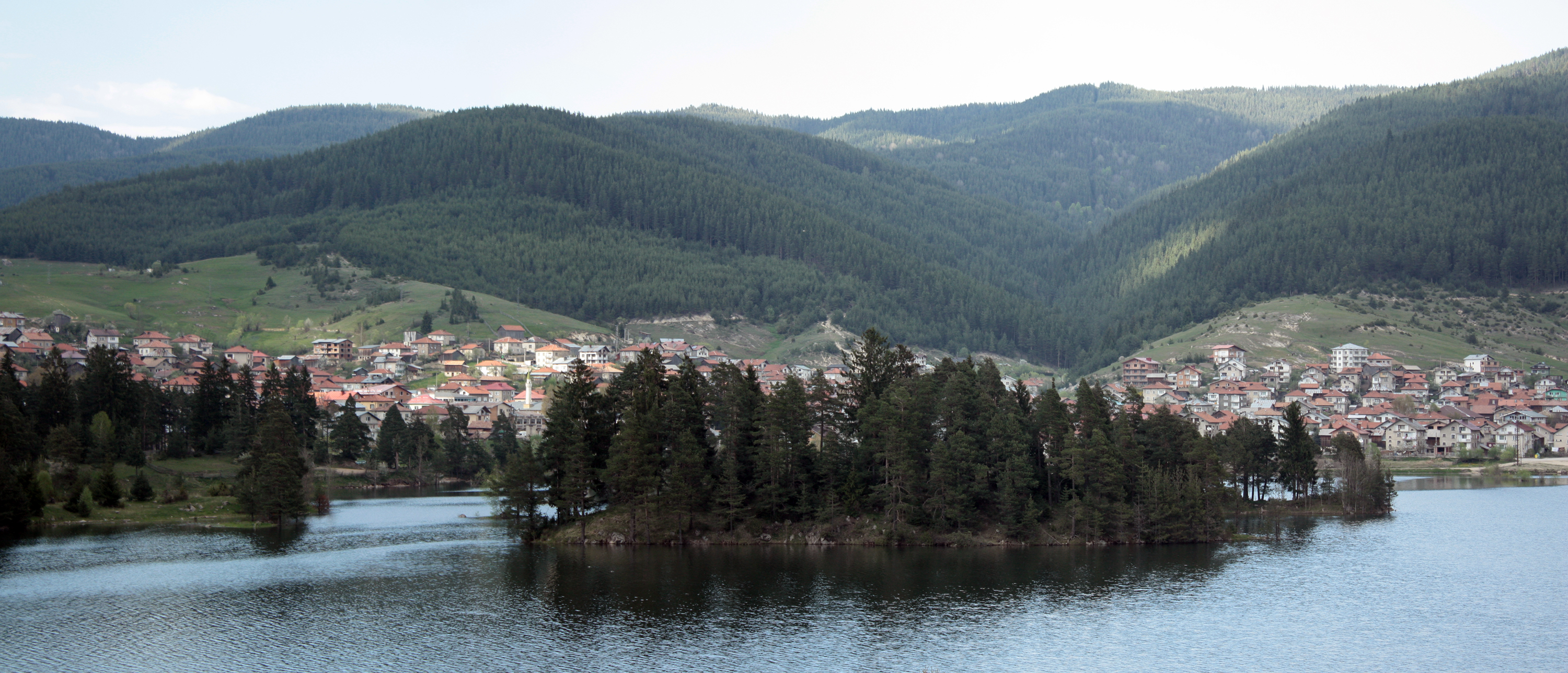
Dospat Resrvoir, Bulgaria

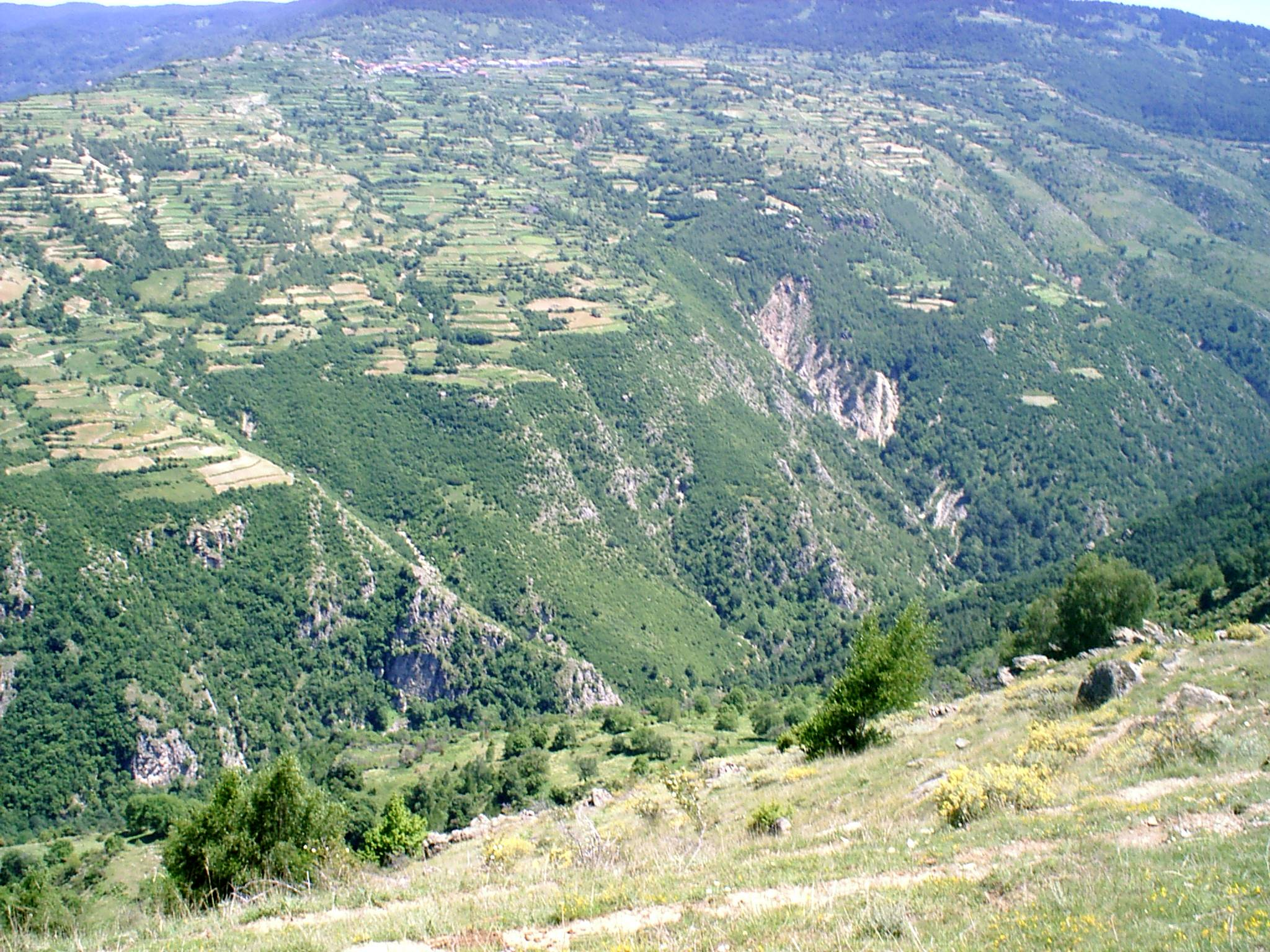
The gorge at Tsarncha and Brashlen, Bulgaria

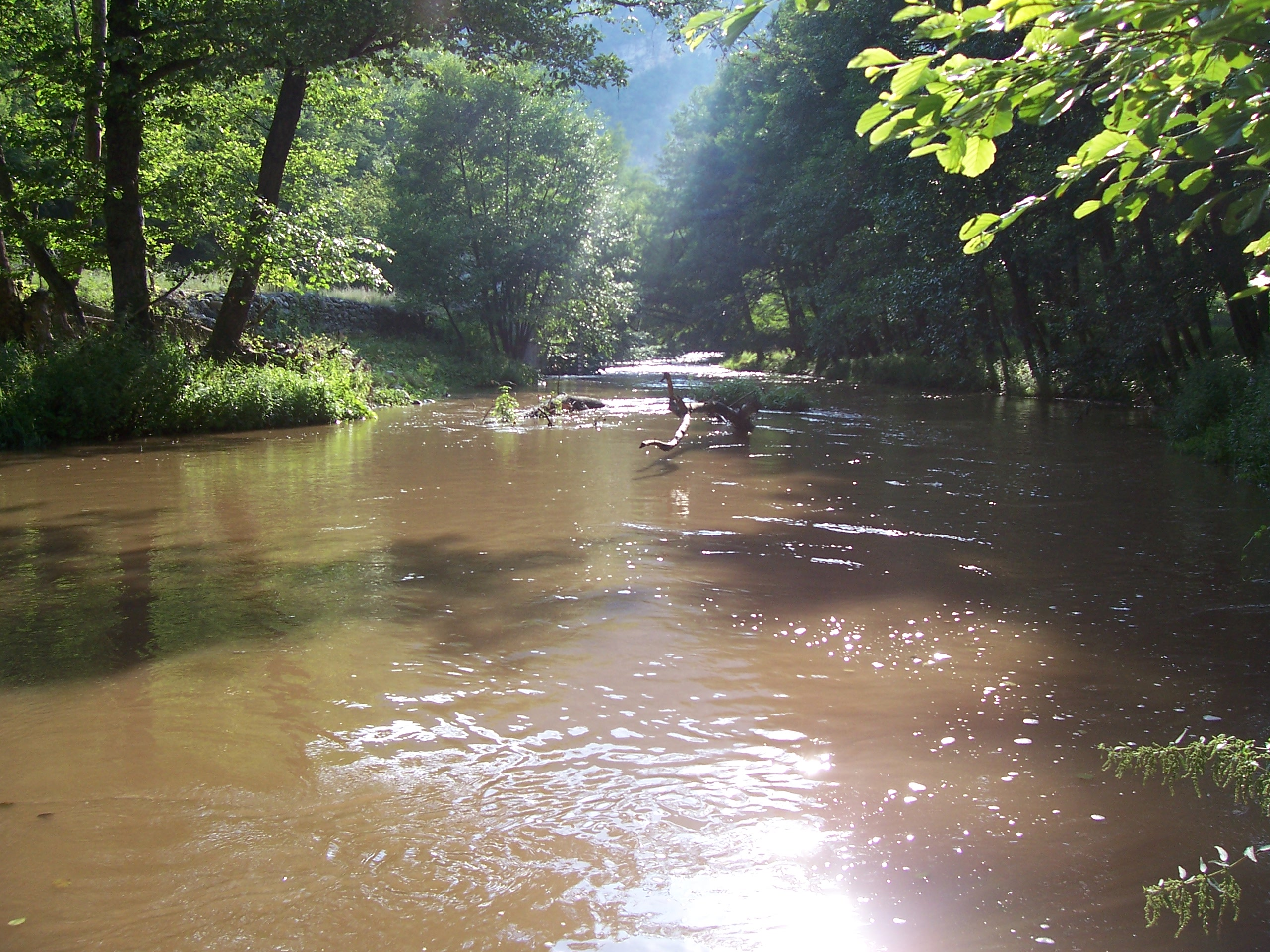
Lower course at the mouth, Greece
