= Sarnena reka =

Sarnena reka (Сърнена река)
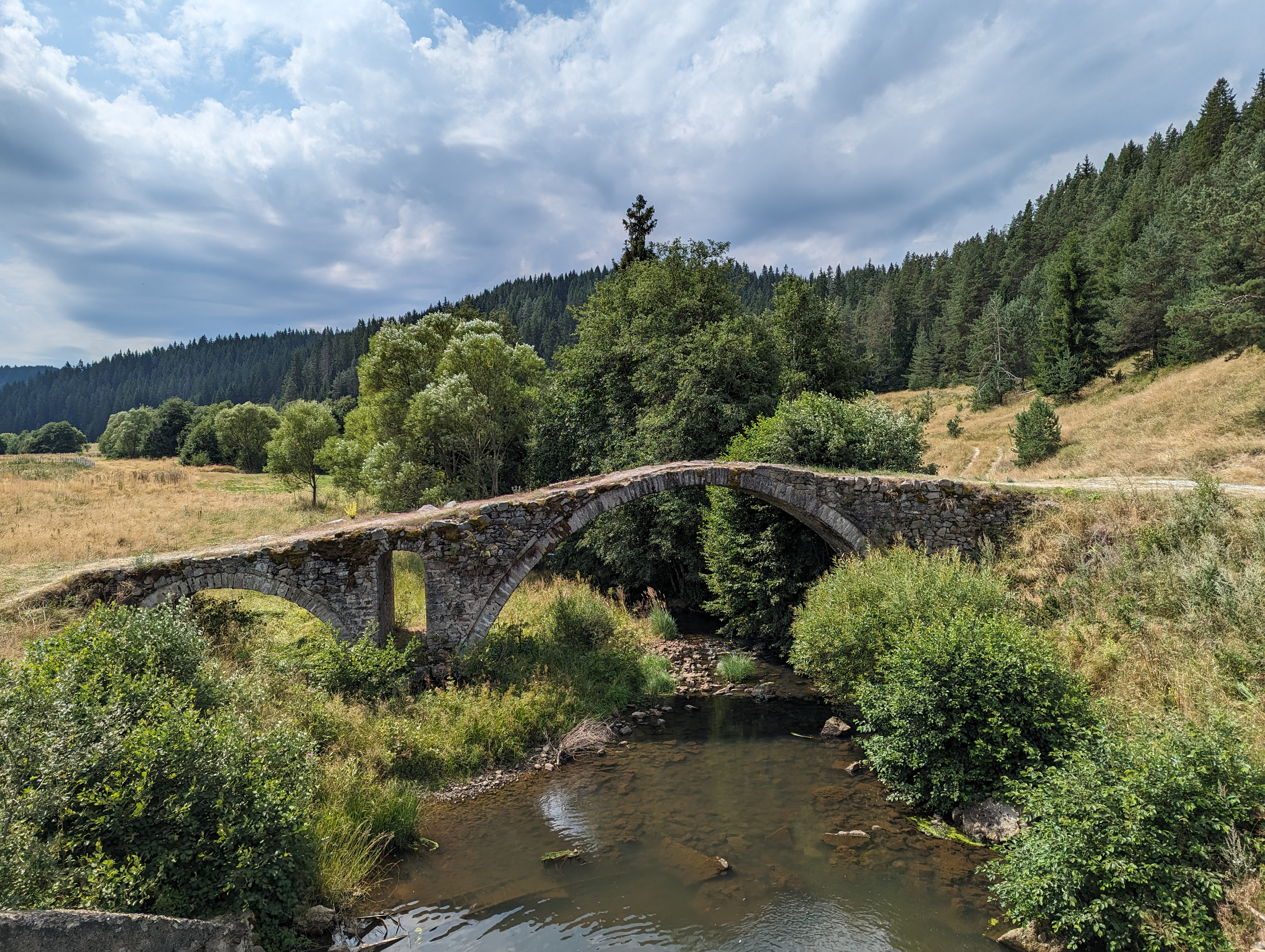
- The river at the Roman Kemera Bridge near Zmeitsa

Location
- Countries: Bulgaria

Physical characteristics
- Source
  - location: Rhodope Mountains
  - elevation: 1,780 m (5,840 ft)
- Mouth
  - location: Dospat
  - coordinates: 41°36′3.96″N 24°10′54.84″E
  - elevation: 1,090 m (3,580 ft)
- Length: 39 km (24 mi)
- Basin size: 181 km^{2} (70 sq mi)

Basin features
- Progression: Dospat→ Mesta

The Sarnena reka (Bulgarian: Сърнена река) is a 39 km-long river in the western Rhodope Mountains, a left tributary of the Dospat, itself a left tributary of the Mesta. It is the Dospat's longest and most important tributary.

The Sarnena reka springs at an altitude of 1,780 m some 650 m southwest of the summit of Pazartepe (1,794 m) in the Veliyshko-Videnishki Ridge of the western Rhodope Mountains. Throughout its whole course the river valley is deep and densely forested. The Sarnena reka initially flows southeast until the third class III-197 road Dospat–Devin near the village of Zmeitsa, where it takes a sharp turn to the southwest. It keeps that direction until the confluence with the Dospat at an altitude of 1,090 m at the village of Barutin.

Its drainage basin covers a territory of 181 km^{2}, or 28.6% of the Dospat's total. The river has a rain–snow feed with high water in December–March and low water in August. The average annual discharge at its mouth is 1.9 m^{3}/s.

The river flows in Pazardzhik and Smolyan Provinces. The only settlement along its course is Barutin in Dospat Municipality of Smolyan Province. Its waters are utilized in the Dospat–Vacha Hydropower Cascade (500 MW), brought via a system of derivations to the Teshel Hydro Power Plant in the neighbouring Vacha river basin.
