= Kasak =

Kasak may refer to:

- Kasak (1992 film), an Indian film by K. Bapaiah
- Kasak (2005 film), an India film
- "Kasak", a song by Anand Raaj Anand from the 2007 Indian film Chhodon Naa Yaar
- Kasak, Bulgaria, a village in Dospat Municipality, Smolyan Province, Bulgaria
- Kasak, Iran, a village in Fars Province, Iran
