= Vishteritsa =

Location
- Country: Bulgaria

Physical characteristics
- Source
  - location: Dabrash, Rhodope Mountains
  - coordinates: 41°50′21.12″N 23°45′28.08″E
  - elevation: 1,586 m (5,203 ft)
- Mouth
  - location: Mesta
  - coordinates: 41°42′54″N 23°50′44.16″E
  - elevation: 1,151 m (3,776 ft)
- Length: 24 km (15 mi)
- Basin size: 80 km^{2} (31 sq mi)

Basin features
- Progression: Kanina→ Mesta

The Vishteritsa (Bulgarian: Вищерица) is a 24 km-long river in southern Bulgaria, a right tributary of the Kanina, itself a left tributary of the river Mesta of the Aegean Sea drainage.

The river takes its source at an altitude of 1,586 m at 1.7 km northwest of the summit of Karakaia (1,761 m) in the Dabrash ridge of the western Rhodope Mountains. It flows in direction south-southeast in a relatively shallow and heavily forested valley. It flows into the Kanina at an altitude of 1,151 m in the Gatera locality. Its discharge at the confluence is almost as large as that of the Kanina. It drains the northwestern slopes of the Dabrash.

Its drainage basin covers a territory of 80 km^{2} or 34.19% of Kanina's total. The main tributaries are the Karatishka reka (left) and the Elushka reka (right).

The river flows entirely in Blagoevgrad Province, in the municipalities of Bansko and Garmen. There are no settlements along its course. In its upper course, near a small lake, is located the Vishteritsa forestry.

Part of the water of the Vishteritsa, along with those of the Kanina, are diverted via seven derivations and a tunnel under the Dabrash ridge to the upper course of the river Dospat and from there to the Dospat Reservoir, which form the highest level of the Dospat–Vacha Hydropower Cascade (500.2 MW).
