= Kanina (river) =

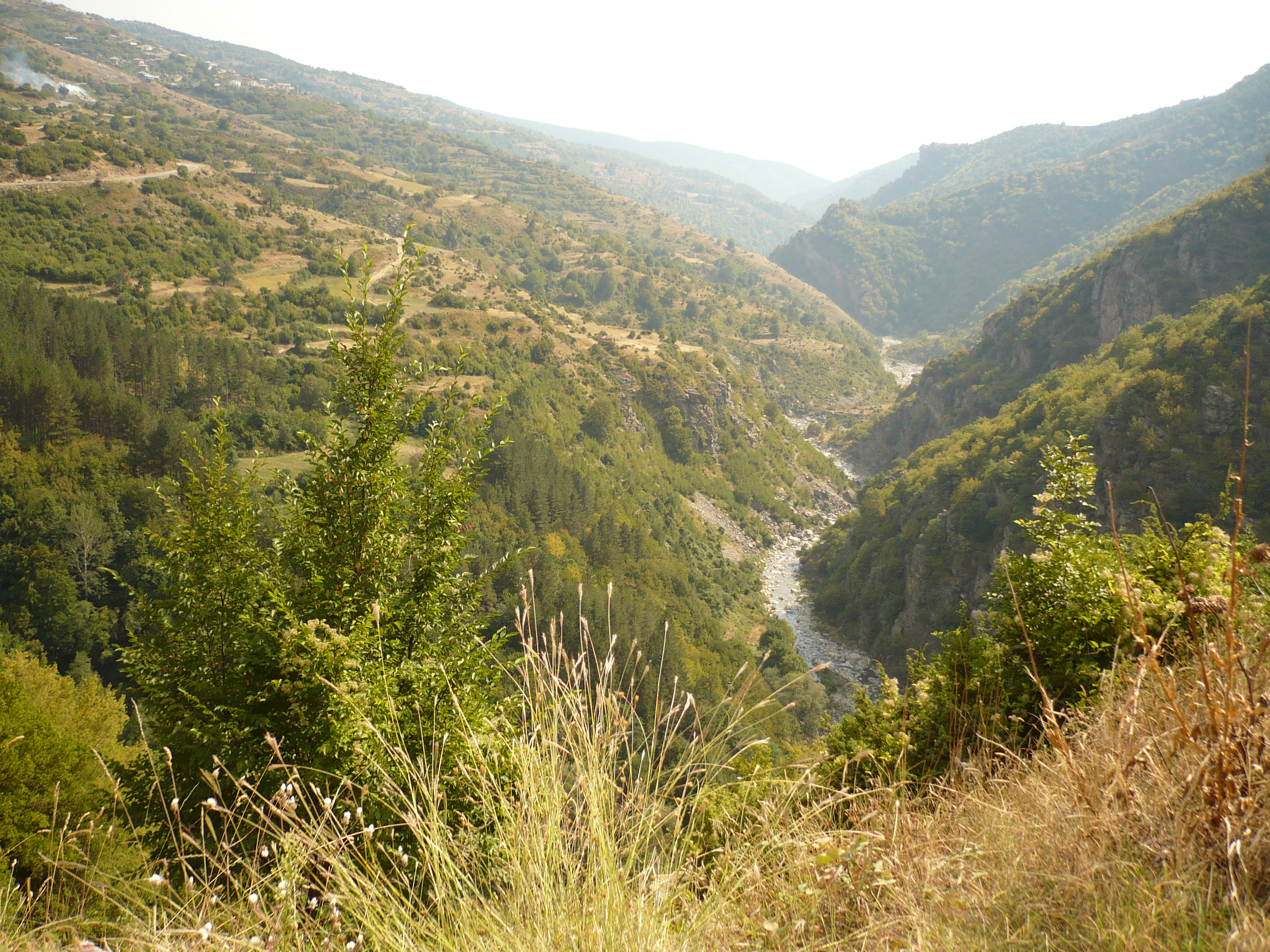

Location
- Country: Bulgaria

Physical characteristics
- Source
  - location: Dabrash, Rhodope Mountains
  - coordinates: 41°43′39″N 23°57′48.96″E
  - elevation: 1,726 m (5,663 ft)
- Mouth
  - location: Mesta
  - coordinates: 41°35′8.16″N 23°46′4.08″E
  - elevation: 503 m (1,650 ft)
- Length: 36 km (22 mi)
- Basin size: 234 km^{2} (90 sq mi)

Basin features
- Progression: Nestos→ Aegean Sea

The Kanina (Bulgarian: Канина) is a 36 km-long river in southern Bulgaria, a left tributary of the river Mesta.

== Geography ==
The river takes its source at an altitude of 1,726 m on the southern slopes of the summit of Sveti Petar (1,745 m) in the Dabrash ridge of the western Rhodope Mountains and drains the southwestern slopes of Dabrash. It initially flows in western direction in a gently sloped heavily forested valley. Following the confluence with its largest tributary the Vishteritsa, the river turns south and its valley deepens significantly, forming steep deforested slopes. In that section the gradient of the current is high and the Kanina forms many rapids and waterfalls. After the village of Marchevo it enters the Gotse Delchev Valley and forms a large alluvial cone. It flows into the Mesta at an altitude of 503 m some 2 km east of the town of Gotse Delchev.

Its drainage basin covers a territory of 234 km^{2} or 6.79% of Mesta's total. The average altitude of the Kanina basin is 1,400 m.

The river has rain-snow feed with high water in April and low water in September. The average annual discharge at the village of Ognyanovo is 2.95 m^{3}/s.

== Settlements and economy ==
The river flows entirely in Blagoevgrad Province. There are two settlements along its course: the villages of Marchevo and Ognyanvo, both in Garmen Municipality. The municipal center Garmen lies less than a kilometer of the Kanina. Perched over its valley overseeing the river are the well-preserved historical villages of Kovachevitsa and Leshten.

Part of the water of the Kanina and its tributary the Vishteritsa are diverted via seven derivations and a tunnel under the Dabrash ridge to the upper course of the river Dospat and from there to the Dospat Reservoir, which form the highest level of the Dospat–Vacha Hydropower Cascade (500.2 MW). In its lower course the waters are used for irrigation.

== Gallery ==
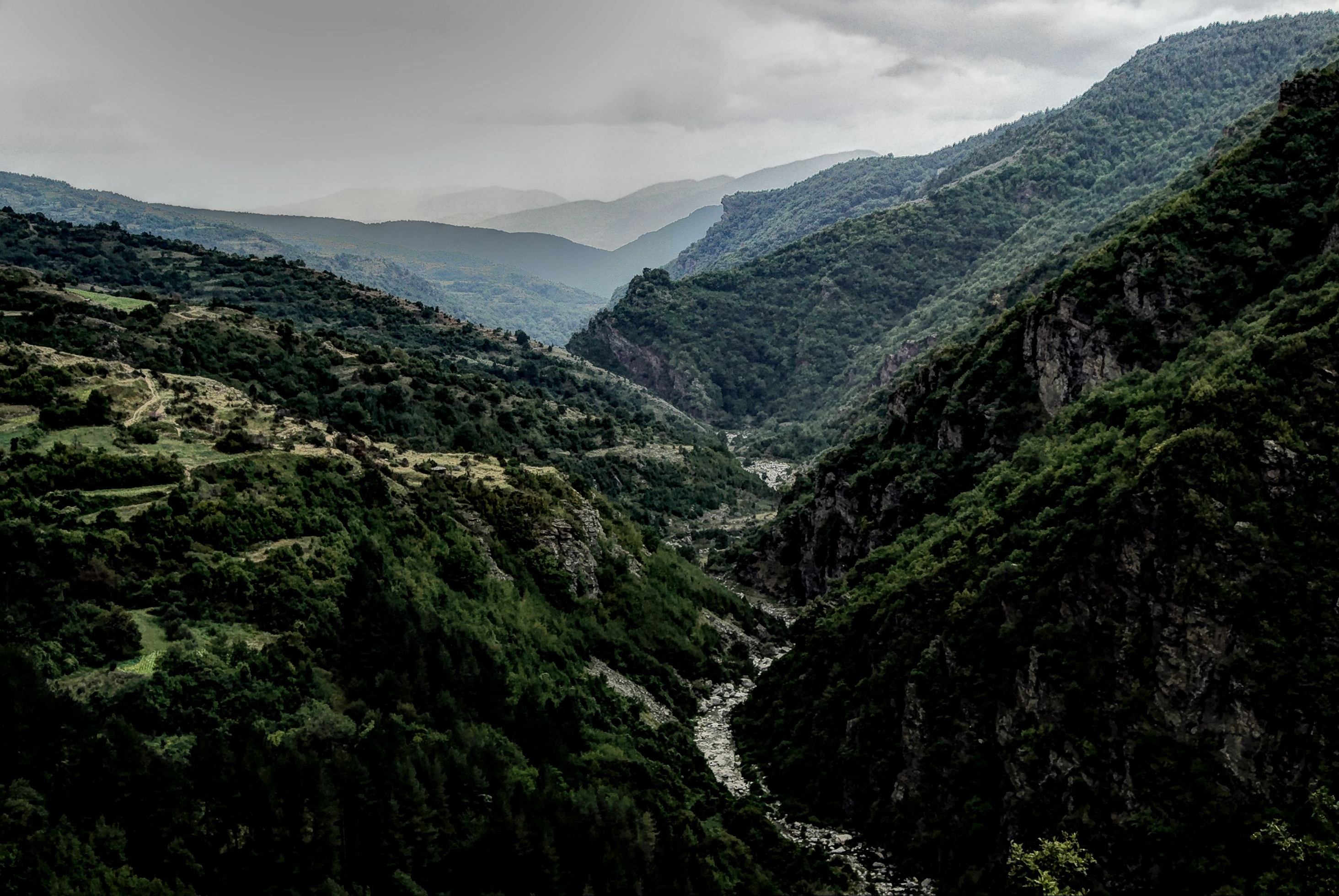
Kanina valley

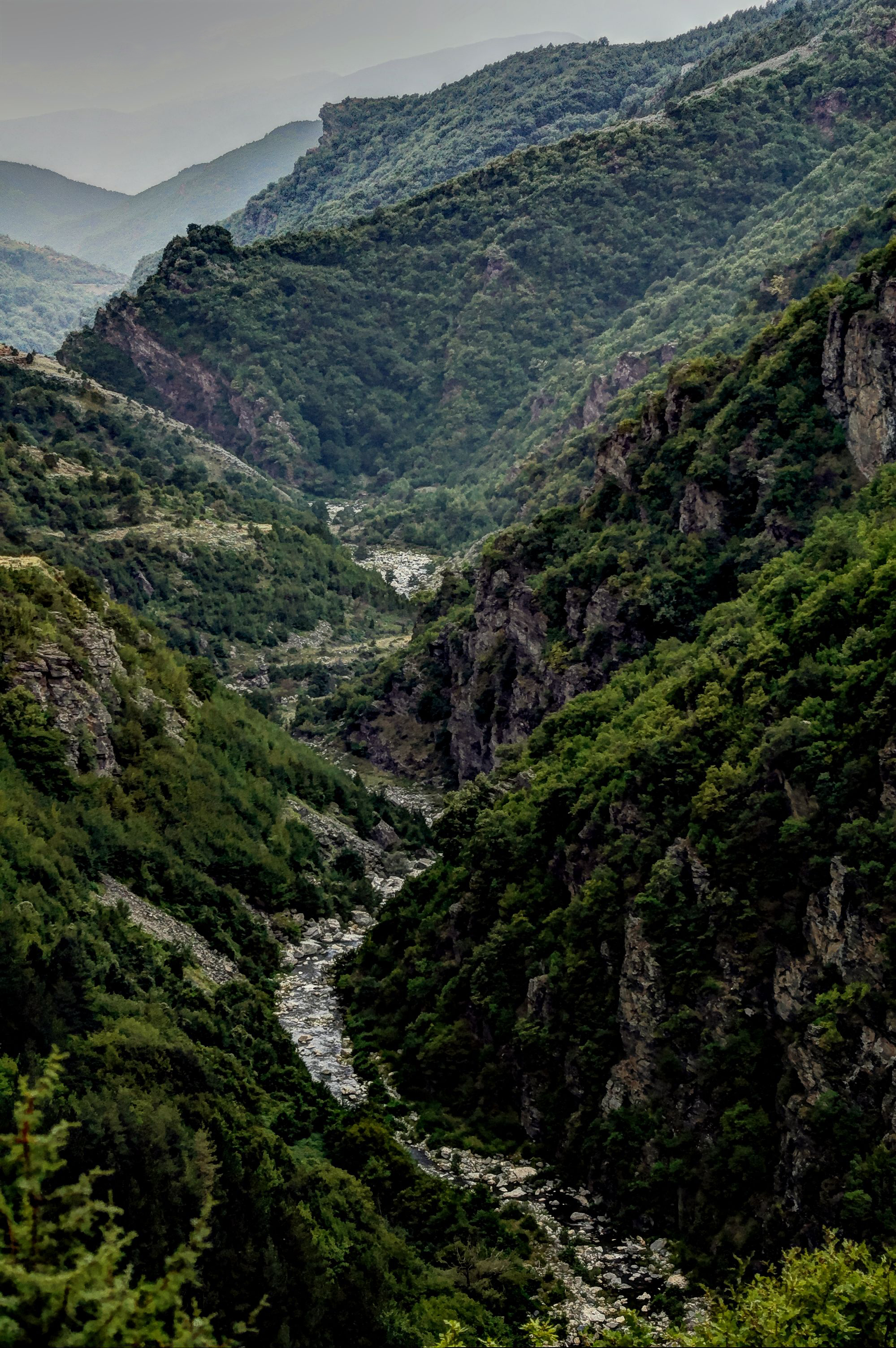
Kanina valley

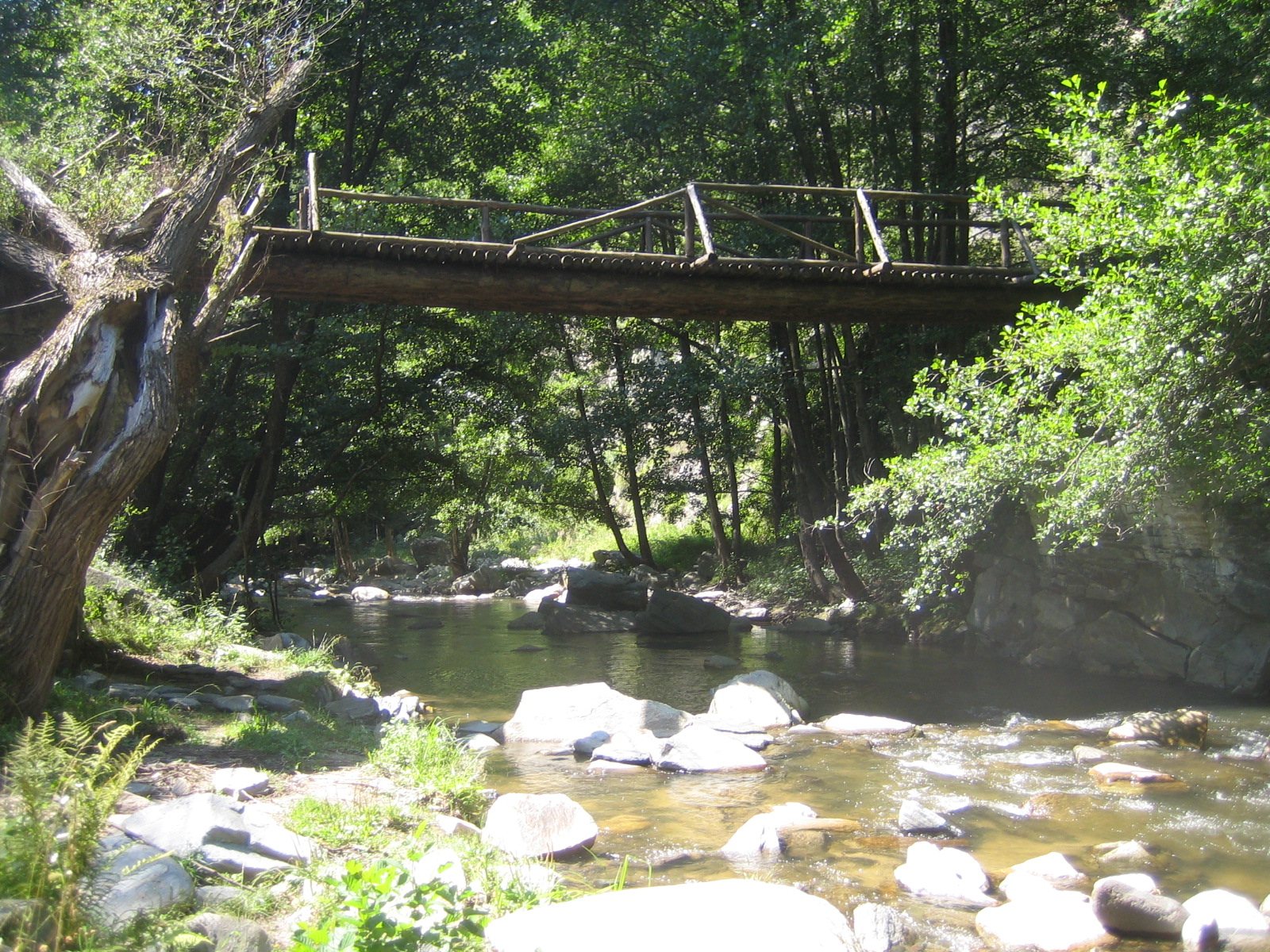
A small bridge near Kovachevitsa

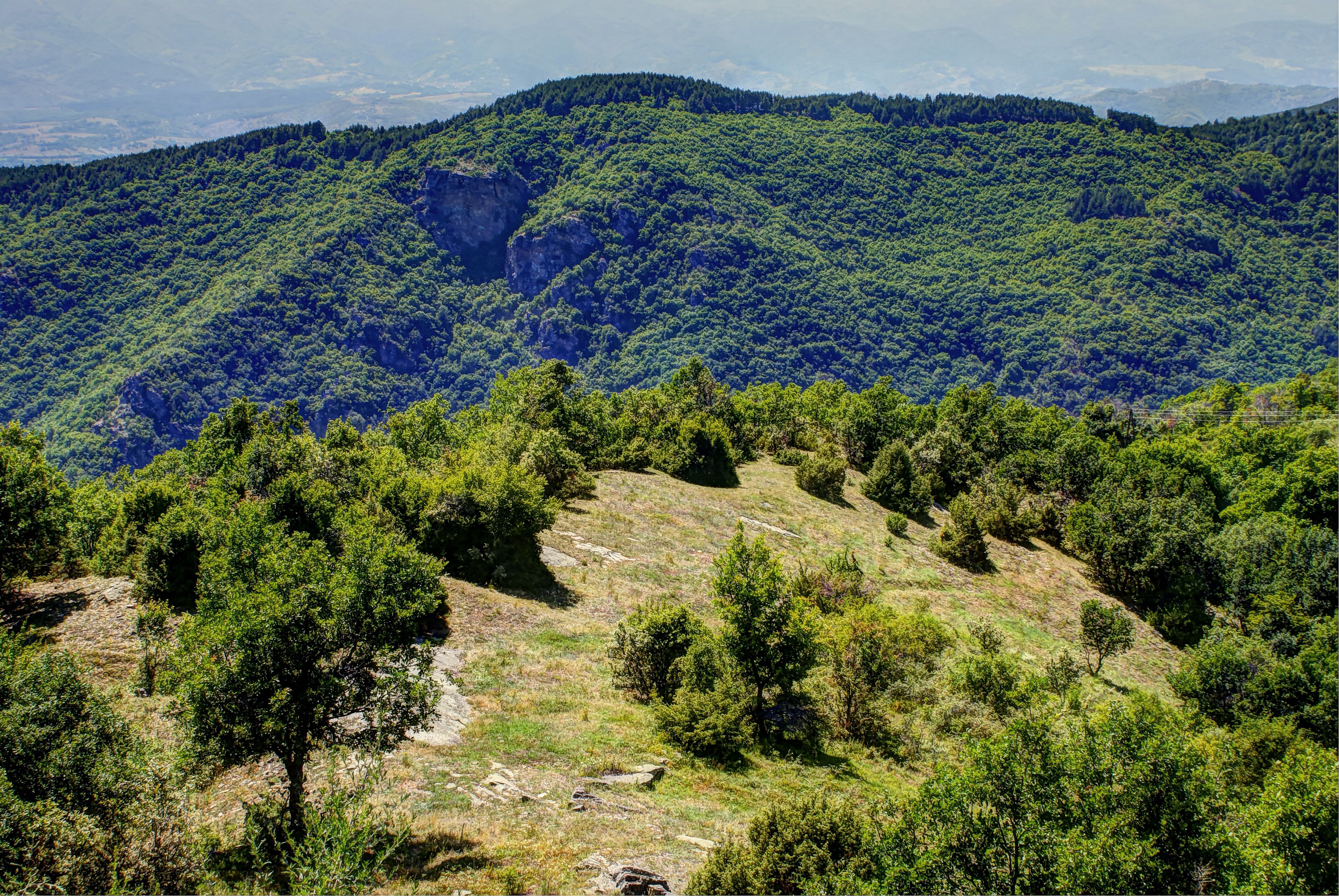
A view near Leshten
