= Lyubcha =

Lyubcha may refer to:

- Lyubcha, Belarus, an urban-type settlement in Grodno Region, Belarus
- Lyubcha, Bulgaria, a village in Smolyan Province, Bulgaria
