= Medeni Polyani =

Medeni Polyani Медени поляни
- Village
- Location within Bulgaria
- Coordinates: 41°51′28.1″N 23°48′13.78″E
- Country: Bulgaria
- Provinces (Oblast): Pazardzhik Province
- Municipality (Obshtina): Sarnitsa Municipality

Government
  - Mayor: Ismail Chalashkan (DPS)

Area
  - Total: 38.53 km^{2} (14.88 sq mi)
- Elevation: 1,430 m (4,690 ft)

Population
  - Total: 721
  - Density: 18.7/km^{2} (48.5/sq mi)
- Time zone: UTC+2 (EET)
  - Summer (DST): UTC+3 (EEST)

Medeni Polyani (Bulgarian: Медени поляни, romanized: Medeni polyani) is a village located in Sarnitsa Municipality, Southern Bulgaria.

== Geography ==
The village is located in the Western Rhodopes, a mountainous area. The elevation is about 1430 meters. It is near the permanently populated areas of Pobit Kamak and Sarnitsa.

== History ==
The old name of the village was Nova Mahala (Bulgarian: Нова махала; Turkish: Yeni komşuluk)

== Religion ==
The population is predominately Muslim.
