= Chavdar, Smolyan Province =

Chavdar Чавдар
- Village
- Location of Chavdar
- Coordinates: 41°35′N 24°14′E
- Country: Bulgaria
- Province (Oblast): Smolyan
- Municipality (Obshtina): Dospat

Government
  - Mayor: Emil Kushev (CEDB)

Area
  - Total: 22.767 km^{2} (8.790 sq mi)
- Elevation: 1,300 m (4,300 ft)

Population (2010-12-15)
  - Total: 329
- Time zone: UTC+2 (EET)
  - Summer (DST): UTC+3 (EEST)
- Postal Code: 4829
- Area code: 030456
- Car plates: CM

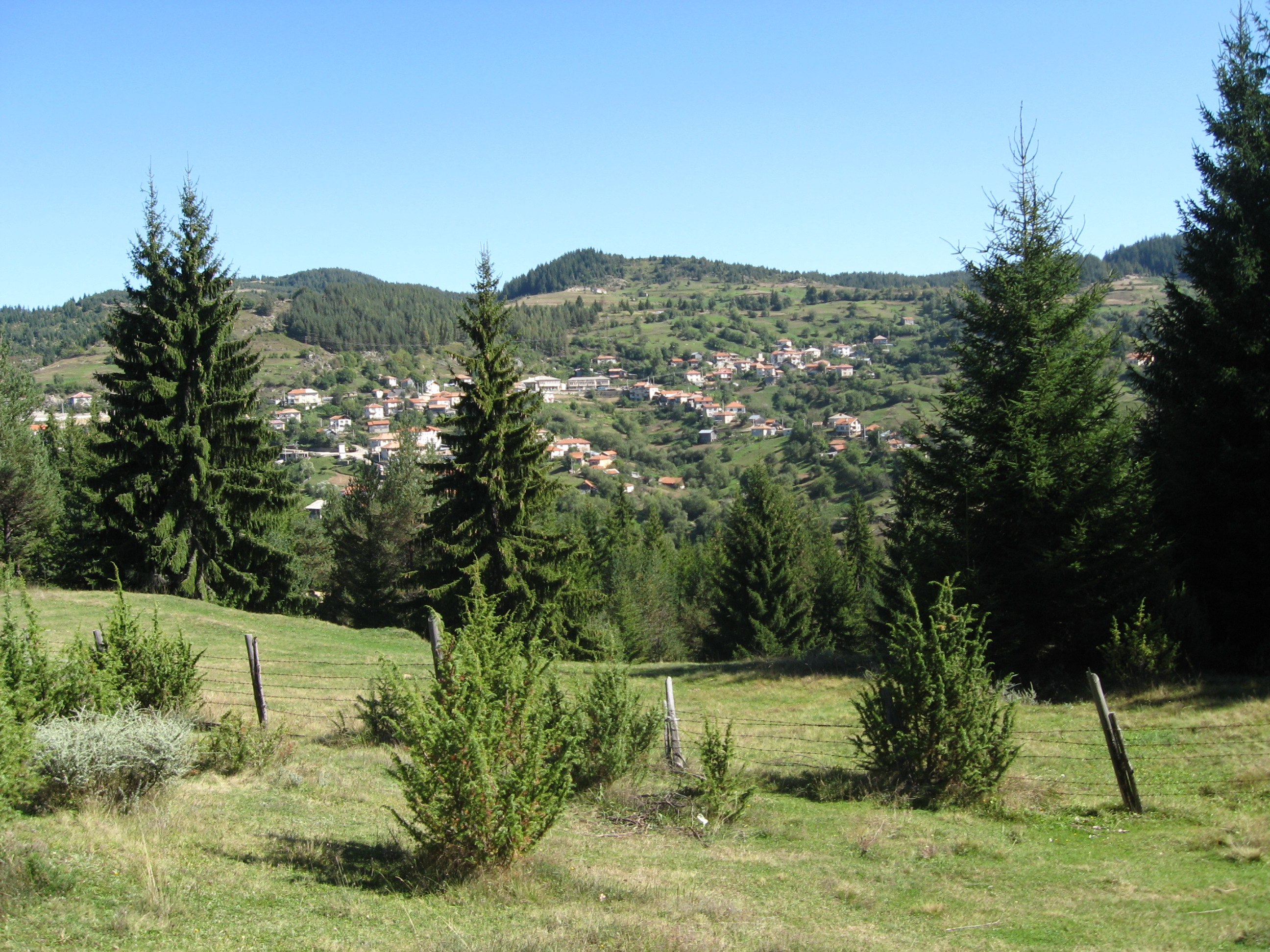

Chavdar (Bulgarian: Чавдар) is a village in southwestern Bulgaria, located in the Dospat Municipality of the Smolyan Province.

== Geography ==
The village of Chavdar is located in the Western Rhodope Mountains. It is situated in the Chech region.

== Religion ==
The population is Muslim. Most inhabitants of the village are Pomaks.
