= Sarnitsa Municipality =

Sarnitsa Municipality Община Сърница
- Municipality
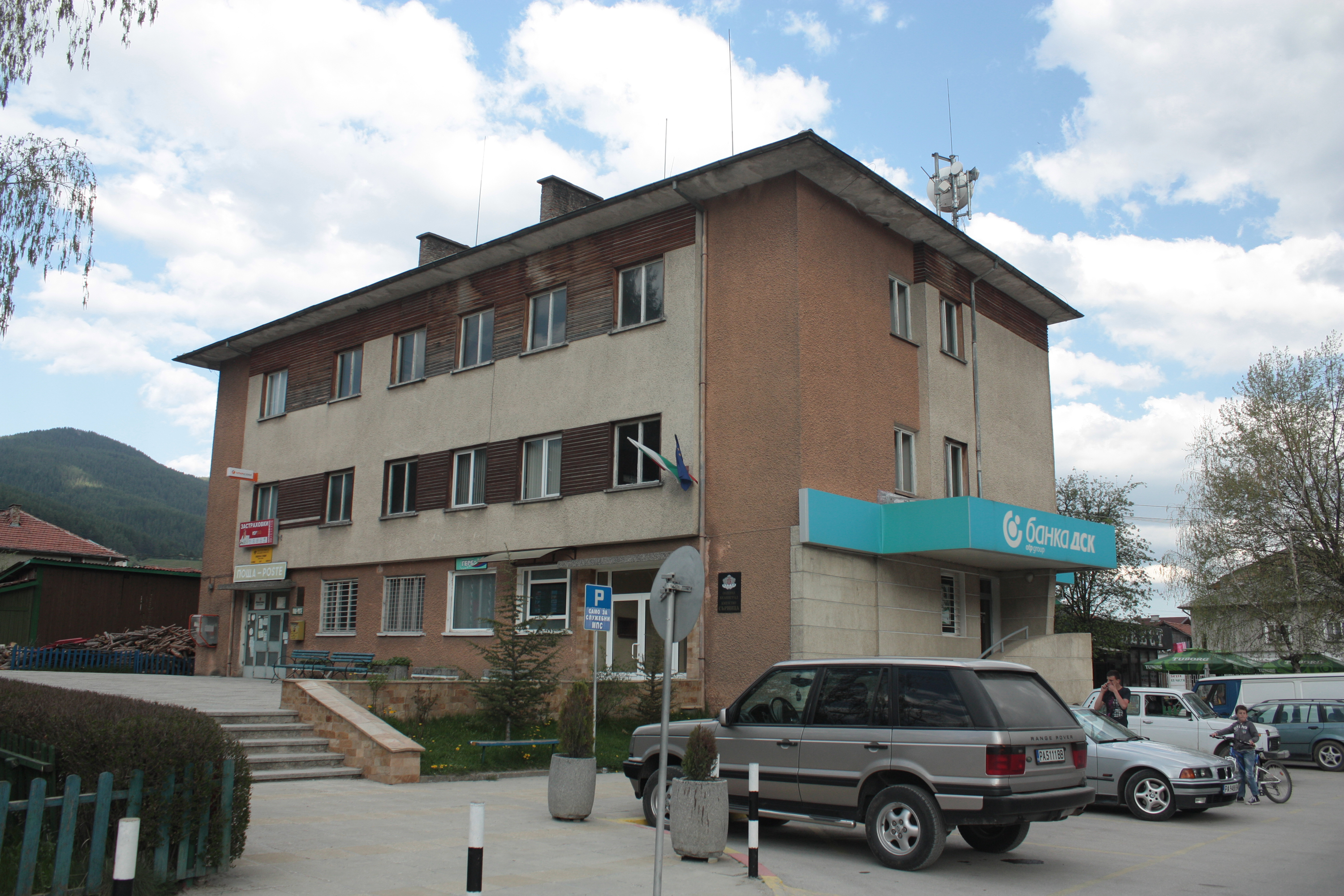

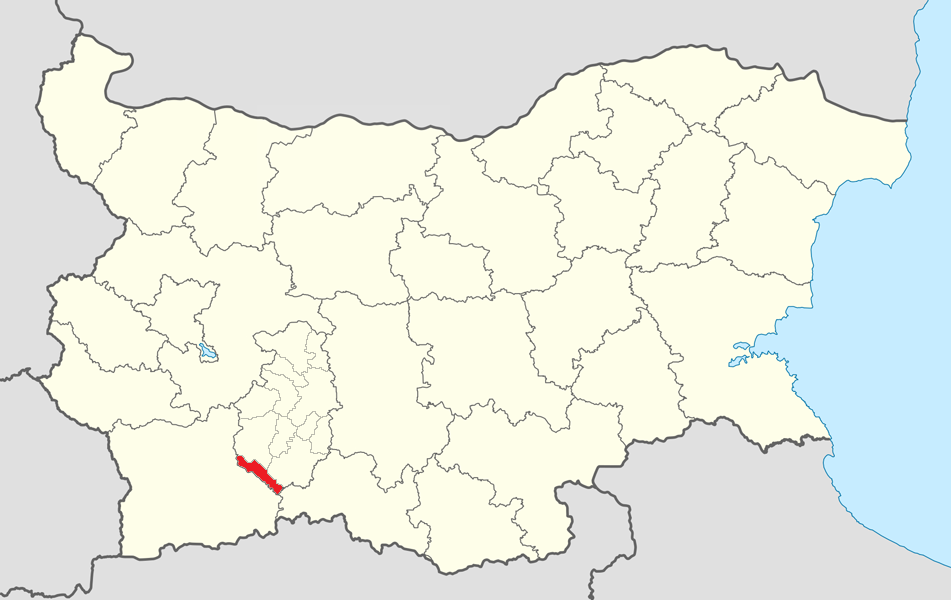

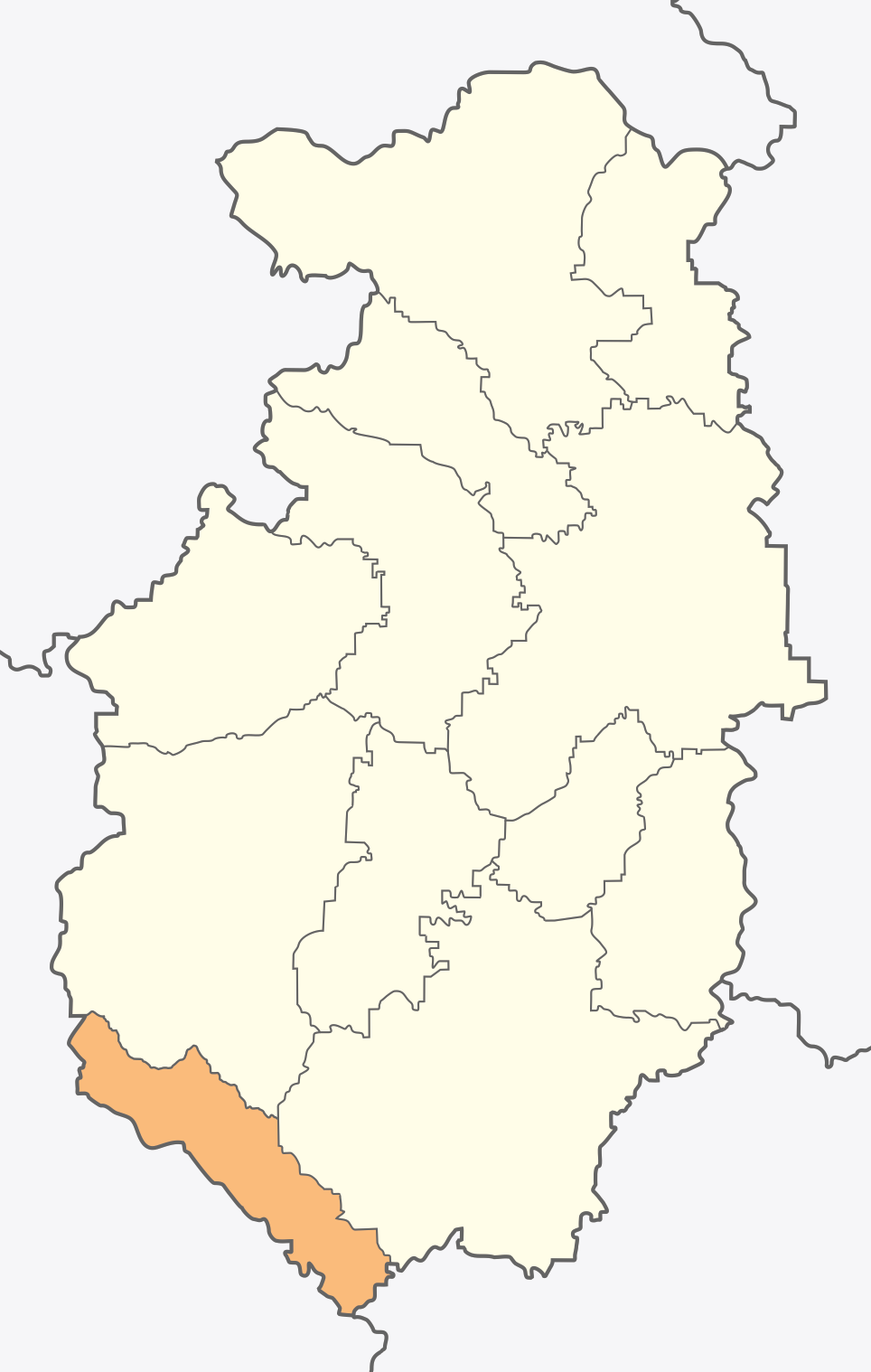
- Coordinates: 41°44′N 24°2′E
- Country: Bulgaria
- Province: Pazardzhik Province

Area
  - Total: 198.59 km^{2} (76.68 sq mi)

Population
  - Total: 4,617
  - Density: 23.25/km^{2} (60.21/sq mi)
- Website: www.sarnitsa.bg

Sarnitsa Municipality (Bulgarian: Община Сърница) is one of the municipalities located in Pazardzhik Province. Its administrative centre is Sarnitsa. The municipality was established on 1 January 2015.

== Geography ==
The municipality is located in the southern portion of the province. The total area is 198.59 km^{2} (76.68 sq mi). It occupies an elongated area that is 34 km long from northwest to southeast and 6 to 8 km in width. It borders Velingrad Municipality in the north and Batak Municipality in the east. The Dospat Municipality of Smolyan Province is to the south-east, while Garmen and Satovcha municipalities of Blagoevgrad Province adjoin the region in the south-west.

== Communities ==
There are only three communities with a permanent population: Sarnitsa, Pobit Kamak and Medeni Polyani, with only Sarnitsa being a town.

The population is around 4,617. The majority of the people in the municipality are Bulgarian-speaking Muslims.
