= Zmeitsa =

Zmeitsa Змеица
- Village
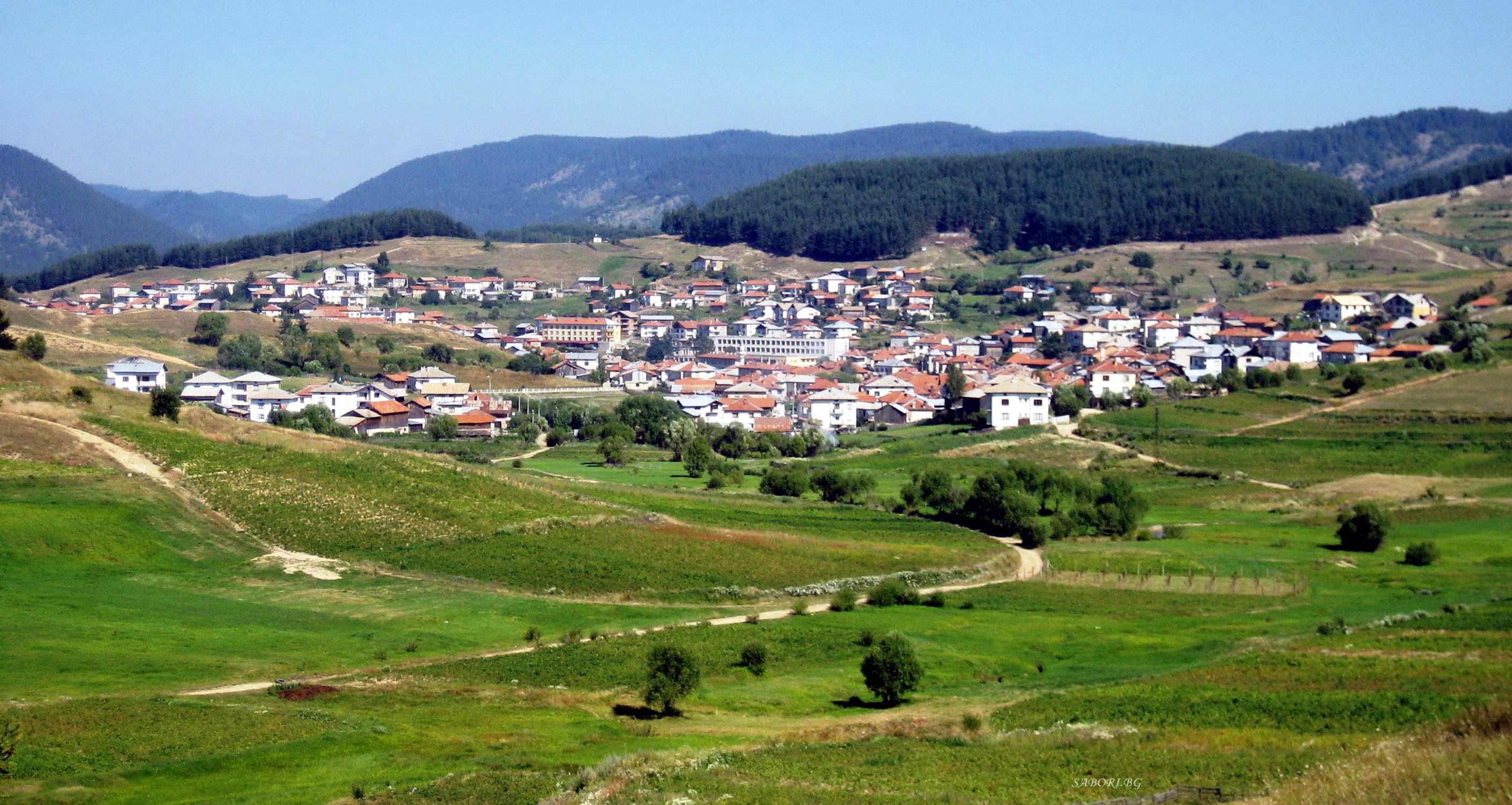

- Location of Zmeitsa
- Coordinates: 41°38′N 24°15′E
- Country: Bulgaria
- Province (Oblast): Smolyan
- Municipality (Obshtina): Dospat

Government
  - Mayor: Venelin Doikov (Social democrats)

Area
  - Total: 34.643 km^{2} (13.376 sq mi)
- Elevation: 1,327 m (4,354 ft)

Population (2010-12-15)
  - Total: 1,473
- Time zone: UTC+2 (EET)
  - Summer (DST): UTC+3 (EEST)
- Postal Code: 4834
- Area code: 03043
- Car plates: CM

Zmeitsa (Bulgarian: Змеица) is a village in southwestern Bulgaria. It is located in the municipality of Dospat, Smolyan Province.

== Geography ==
The village of Zmeitsa is located in the Western Rhodope Mountains. It is the easternmost settlement in the Chech region. The highest peak is Gioz Tepe - 1652 m.

== Religion ==
Christians and Muslims live in the village.

== Public institutions ==
Local government office, library, kindergarten and school.

== Sights ==
- Roman-style bridge over the Sarnena reka river.

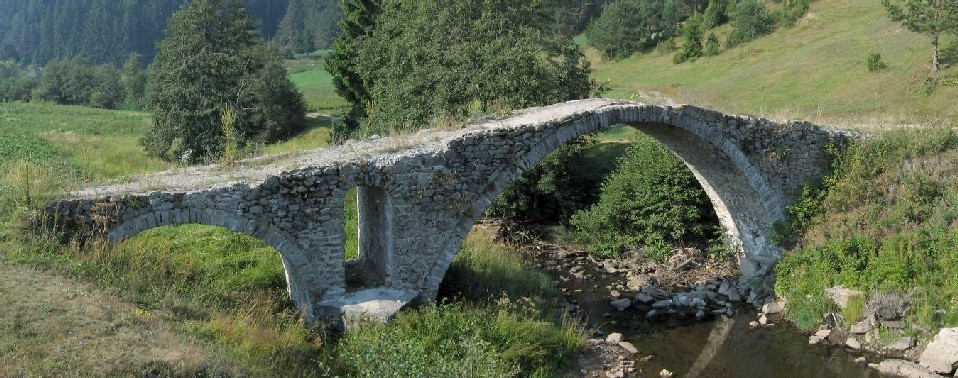
Roman-style bridge
