= Kasak, Bulgaria =

Kasak Късак
- Village
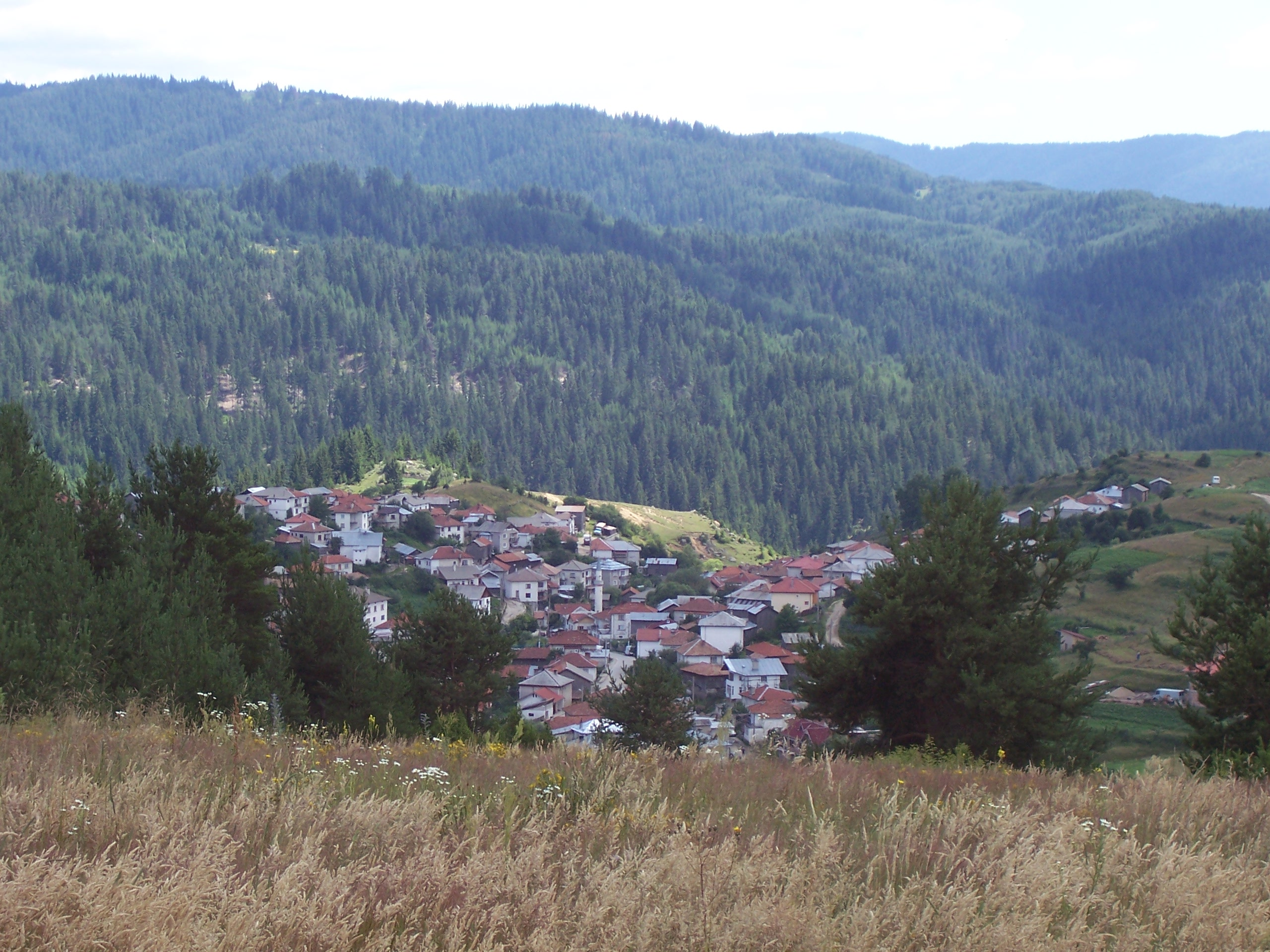

- Location of Kasak
- Coordinates: 41°38′N 24°13′E
- Country: Bulgaria
- Province (Oblast): Smolyan
- Municipality (Obshtina): Dospat

Government
  - Mayor: Dzhamal Shalganov (MRF)

Area
  - Total: 38.231 km^{2} (14.761 sq mi)
- Elevation: 1,338 m (4,390 ft)

Population (2010-12-15)
  - Total: 809
- Time zone: UTC+2 (EET)
  - Summer (DST): UTC+3 (EEST)
- Postal Code: 4832
- Area code: 030457
- Car plates: CM

Kasak (Bulgarian: Късак) is a village in southwestern Bulgaria. It is located in the municipality of Dospat Municipality of the Smolyan Province.

== Geography ==
The village of Kasak is located in the Western Rhodope Mountains. It is situated in the Chech region.

== Religion ==
The population is Muslim. Most inhabitants of the village are Pomaks.
