= Lyubcha, Bulgaria =

Lyubcha Любча
- Village
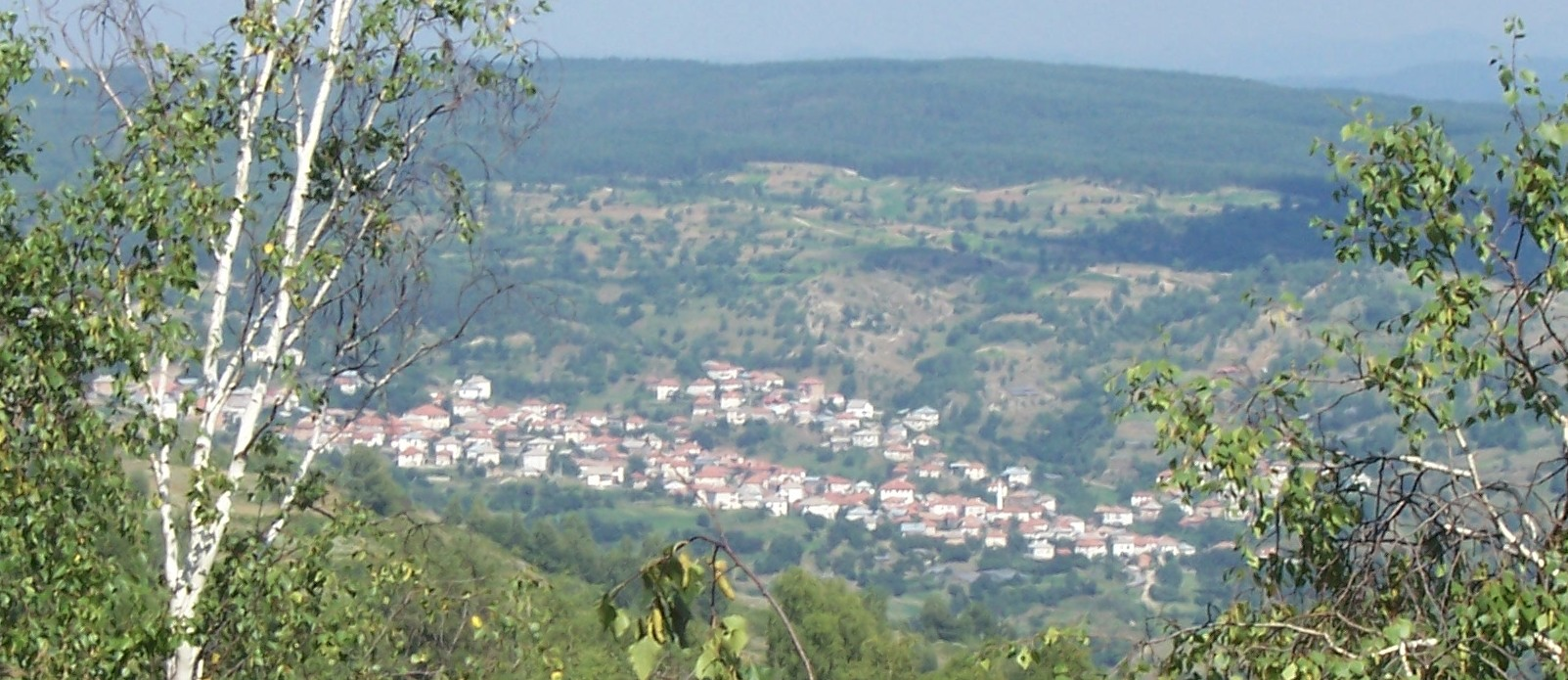

- Location of Ljubcha
- Coordinates: 41°37′N 24°6′E
- Country: Bulgaria
- Province (Oblast): Smolyan
- Municipality (Obshtina): Dospat

Government
  - Mayor: Veliko Mitkov (MRF)

Area
  - Total: 20.037 km^{2} (7.736 sq mi)
- Elevation: 1,170 m (3,840 ft)

Population (2010-12-15)
  - Total: 917
- Time zone: UTC+2 (EET)
  - Summer (DST): UTC+3 (EEST)
- Postal Code: 4833
- Area code: 030458
- Vehicle registration: CM

Lyubcha (Bulgarian: Любча) is a village in southwestern Bulgaria. It is located in the municipality of Dospat, Smolyan Province.

== Geography ==
The village of Lyubcha is located in the Western Rhodope Mountains. It is situated in the Chech region.

== History ==
According to Vasil Kanchov, in 1900 Lyubcha was populated by 320 Bulgarian Muslims.

== Religion ==
The population is Muslim. Most inhabitants of the village are Pomaks.

== Sights ==
- Roman-style bridge
