= Tsrancha =

Tsrancha Црънча
- Village
- Location of Tsrancha
- Coordinates: 41°36′N 24°11′E
- Country: Bulgaria
- Province (Oblast): Smolyan
- Municipality (Obshtina): Dospat

Government
  - Mayor: Ilin Dolapchiev (MRF)

Area
  - Total: 11.963 km^{2} (4.619 sq mi)
- Elevation: 1,112 m (3,648 ft)

Population (2010-12-15)
  - Total: 601
- Time zone: UTC+2 (EET)
  - Summer (DST): UTC+3 (EEST)
- Postal Code: 4837
- Area code: 030459
- Vehicle registration: CM

Tsrancha (Bulgarian: Црънча [ˈt͡srɤnt͡ʃɐ]) is a village in southwestern Bulgaria. It is located in the municipality of Dospat, Smolyan Province.

== Geography ==
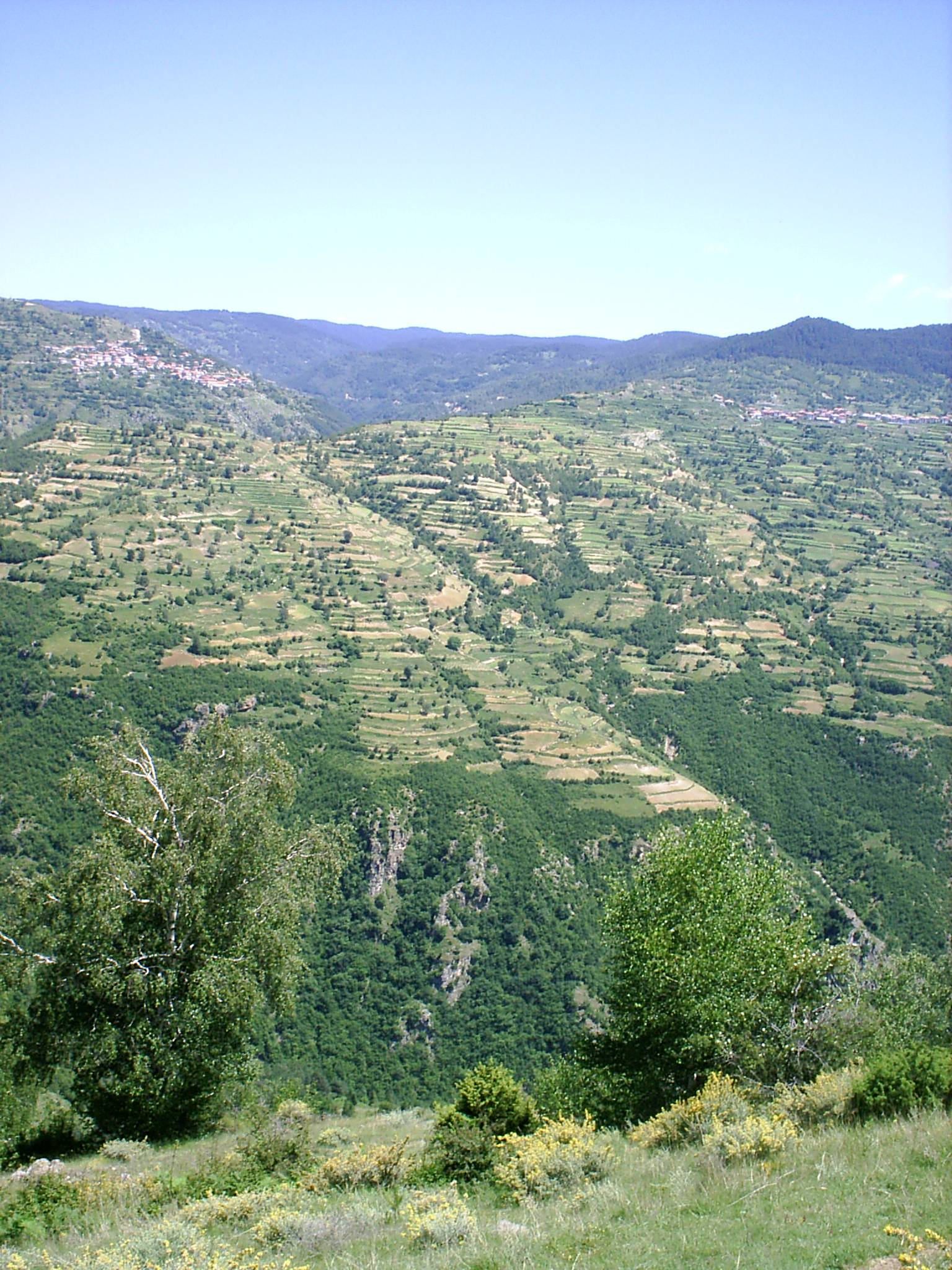
The village of Tsrancha on the left and the village of Brashten on the right.

The village of Tsrancha is located in the Western Rhodope Mountains. It is situated in the Chech region.

== Religion ==
The population is Muslim. Most inhabitants of the village are Pomaks.
