= Brashten =

Brashten Бръщен
- Village
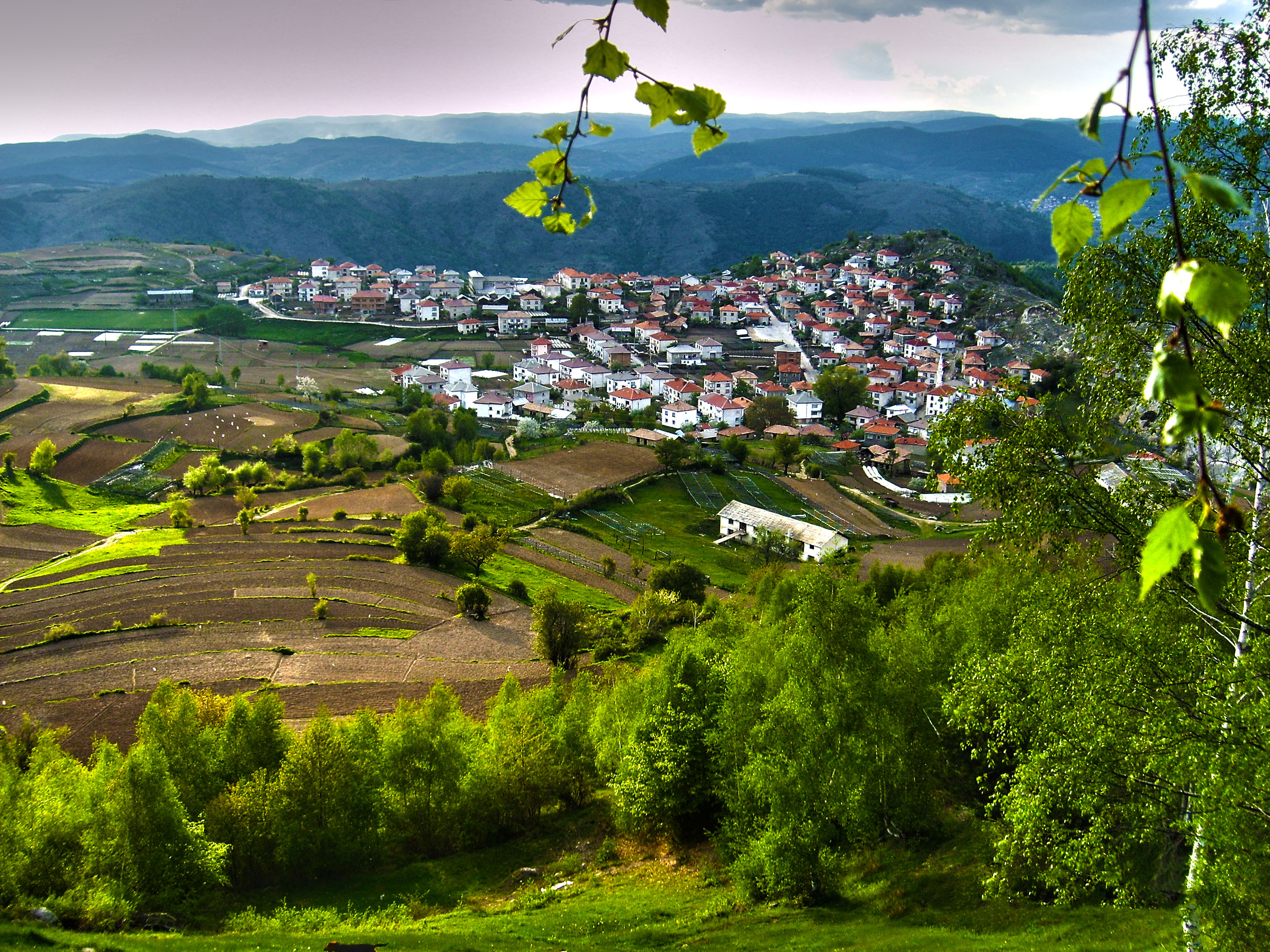

- Location of Brashten
- Coordinates: 41°36′N 24°11′E
- Country: Bulgaria
- Province (Oblast): Smolyan
- Municipality (Obshtina): Dospat

Government
  - Mayor: Kemal Boshnakov (Lider)

Area
  - Total: 30.914 km^{2} (11.936 sq mi)
- Elevation: 1,079 m (3,540 ft)

Population (2010-12-15)
  - Total: 884
- Time zone: UTC+2 (EET)
  - Summer (DST): UTC+3 (EEST)
- Postal Code: 4821
- Area code: 030459
- Vehicle registration: CM

Brashten (Bulgarian: Бръщен) is a village in southwestern Bulgaria. It is located in the municipality of Dospat, Smolyan Province.

== Geography ==
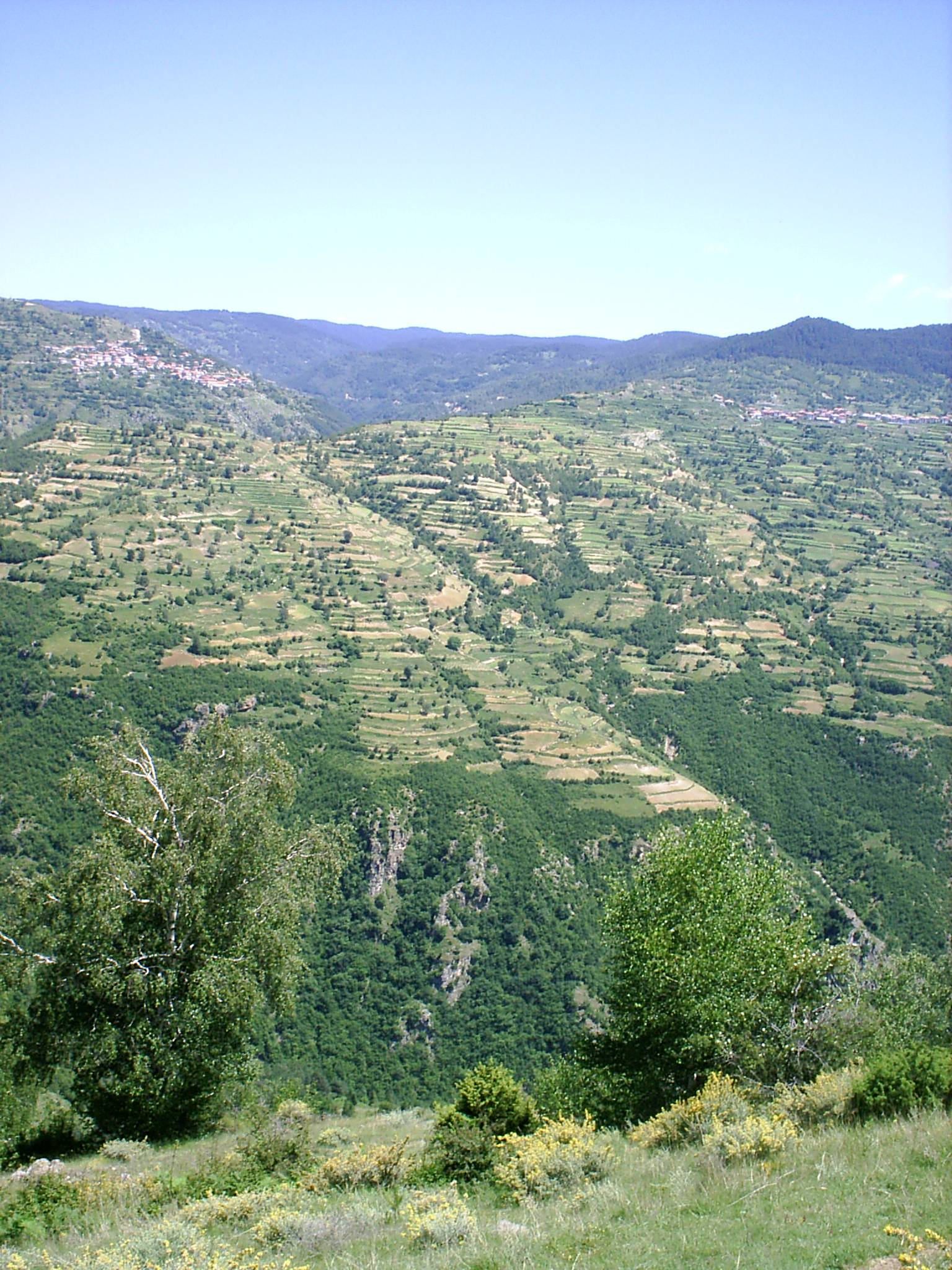
The village of Tsrancha on the left and the village of Brashten on the right

The village of Brashten is located in the Western Rhodope Mountains. It is situated in the Chech region.

== History ==
According to Vasil Kanchov, in 1900 Brashten was populated by 220 Bulgarian Muslims, living in 50 houses.

== Religion ==
The population is Muslim. Most inhabitants of the village are Pomaks.

== Sights ==
- The remains of a Roman-style bridge.
- The memorial of Vergil Vaklinov - a ranger, considered by many to have been a hero.
