= Dospat =

Dospat Доспат
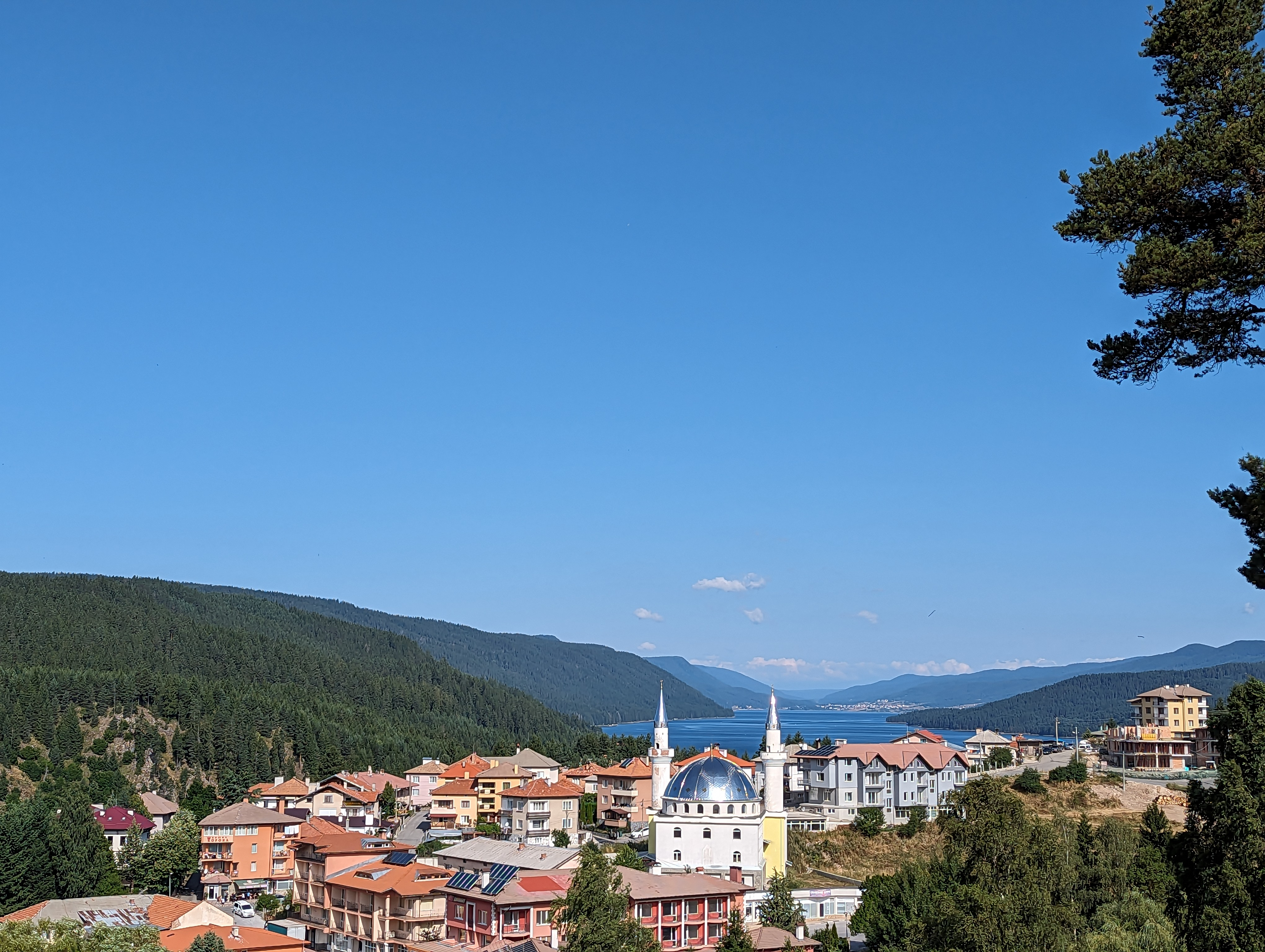

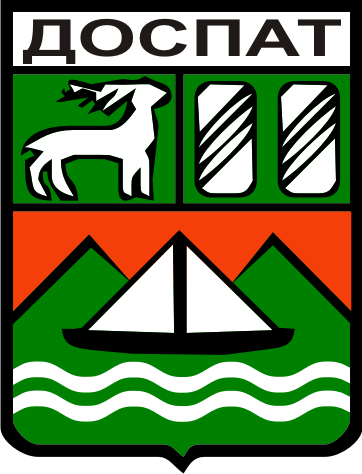
- Coat of arms

- Location of Dospat
- Coordinates: 41°39′N 24°10′E
- Country: Bulgaria
- Provinces (Oblast): Smolyan

Government
  - Mayor: Elin Radev (CEDB)

Area
  - City: 69.196 km^{2} (26.717 sq mi)
- Elevation: 1,358 m (4,455 ft)

Population (2010-12-15)
  - City: 2,425
  - Urban: 9,116
- Time zone: UTC+2 (EET)
  - Summer (DST): UTC+3 (EEST)
- Postal Code: 4830
- Area code: 03045, +359-3045
- Car plates: CM

Dospat (Bulgarian: Доспат) is a town in the very south of Bulgaria, part of Smolyan Province, situated in the Rhodope Mountains, close to Dospat Dam. It is the administrative centre of the homonymous Dospat Municipality. As of December 2010, the town had a population of 2,425 who are mainly Bulgarian Muslims.

The town was probably founded by Despot Alexius Slav in the 12th or 13th century, from whose title (despot) its name is very likely derived. Dospat Dam is the highest dam in Bulgaria by altitude and, with its 22 km^{2} of water area, the second largest in capacity. It is fed by the River Dospat.

The town was pillaged and mostly destroyed by members of the Supreme Macedonian-Adrianople Committee, a Bulgarian paramilitary group. Of the 200 homes, only 7 were left standing.

== Honour ==
Dospat Peak on Livingston Island in the South Shetland Islands, Antarctica is named after Dospat.
