= Sarnitsa, Pazardzhik Province =

Sarnitsa
- Town
- Location of Sarnitsa, Bulgaria
- Coordinates: 41°44′N 24°2′E
- Country: Bulgaria
- Provinces (Oblast): Pazardzhik
- Municipality (Obshtina): Sarnitsa

Government
  - Mayor: Nebi Bozov
- Elevation: 1,250 m (4,100 ft)

Population (2011)
  - Total: 3,579
- Time zone: UTC+2 (EET)
- Postal Code: 4633
- Area code: 03547
- Website: http://www.sarnitsa.bg/

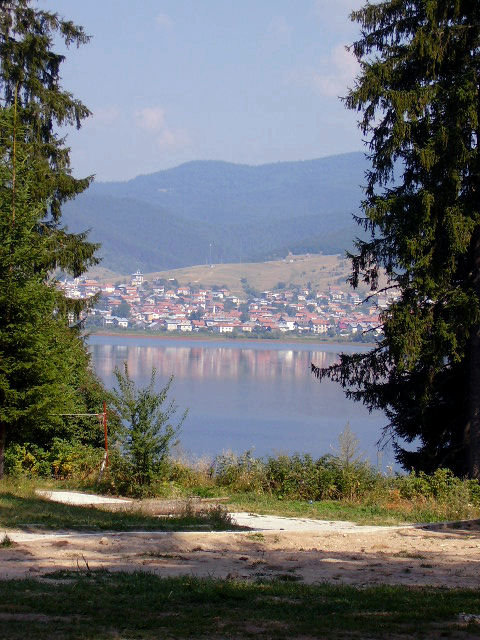
The town of Sarnitsa as viewed from the opposite bank of the Dospat Dam.

Sarnitsa (also transcribed Surnica, Bulgarian: Сърница [sɐrˈnit͡sɐ]) is a small town in the Pazardzhik Province, southern Bulgaria. As of 2022 it had 3,511 inhabitants. Formerly a village, it gained its town status in September 2003 and since January 2015 has formed the administrative centre of the homonymous Sarnitsa Municipality.

Most inhabitants are ethnic Bulgarians and their main religion is Islam. That means that Sarnitsa is a predominantly Pomak settlement. The city has an ageing age structure.
