= Barutin =

Barutin Барутин
- Village
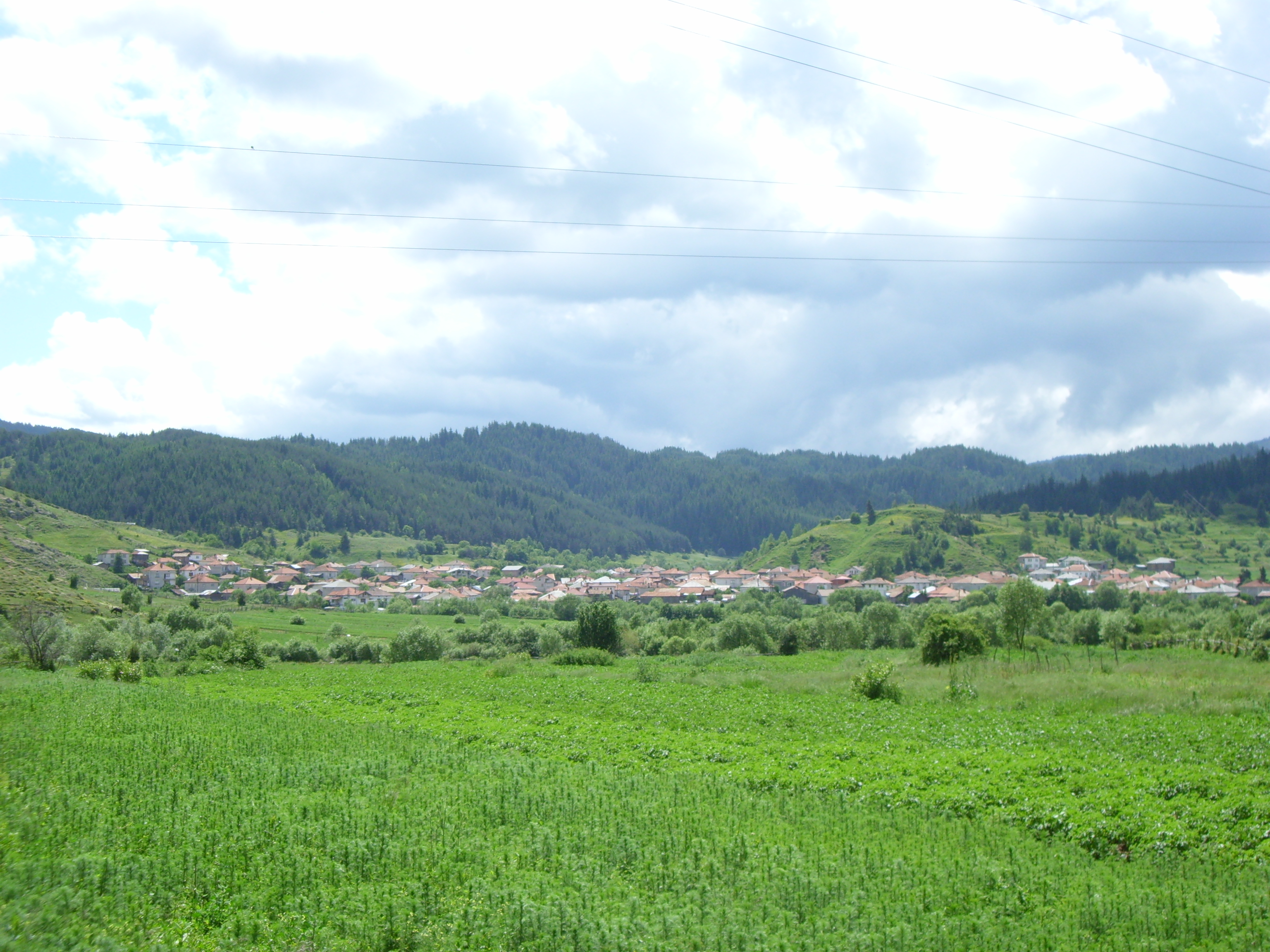

- Location of Barutin
- Coordinates: 41°36′N 24°11′E
- Country: Bulgaria
- Province (Oblast): Smolyan
- Municipality (Obshtina): Dospat

Government
  - Mayor: Venelin Kalfov (BSP...)

Area
  - Total: 54.946 km^{2} (21.215 sq mi)
- Elevation: 1,185 m (3,888 ft)

Population (2010-12-15)
  - Total: 1,772
- Time zone: UTC+2 (EET)
  - Summer (DST): UTC+3 (EEST)
- Postal Code: 4830
- Area code: 03046
- Vehicle registration: CM

Barutin (Bulgarian: Барутин) is a village in southwestern Bulgaria. It is located in the municipality of Dospat, Smolyan Province.

== Geography ==
The village of Barutin is located in the Western Rhodope Mountains. It is situated in the Chech region.

== History ==
From the middle of the 17th to the beginning of the 19th century the majority of the inhabitants of the village had Yörük origins. They abandoned the village in the beginning of the 19th century, and in the middle of the 19th century the majority of the inhabitants were Pomaks. During the April Uprising Ahmed aga Barutinliata led a campaign against Batak from this village.

== Religion ==
The majority of the population is Muslim. Most inhabitants of the village are Pomaks.

== Sights ==
- Basilica from the 5–6th century.
- Thracian settlement in the Dolna Bartina region.
