= Dospat Reservoir =

Reservoir in Bulgaria

Dospat Dam Язовир Доспат
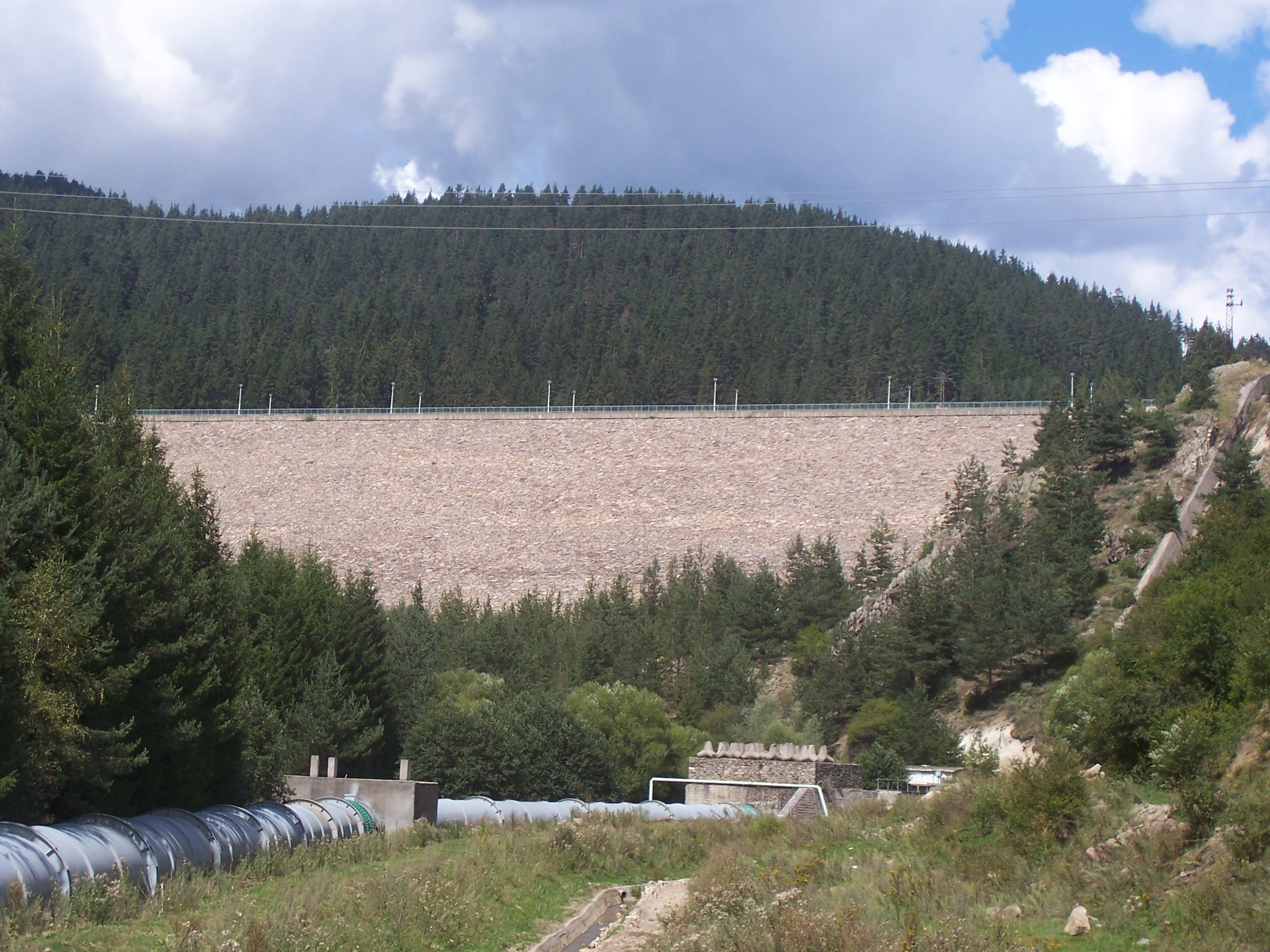
- Dospat Dam

- Location within Bulgaria
- Country: Bulgaria
- Location: Smolyan Province, Pazardzhik Province
- Coordinates: 41°41′54″N 24°05′10″E
- Status: Active
- Opening date: 1969
- Owner: NEK EAD

Dam and spillways
- Type of dam: Rock-fill with clay core
- Impounds: Dospat River
- Height: 60.5 m (198 ft)
- Length: 230 m (750 ft)
- Spillways: 1
- Spillway type: trench type
- Spillway capacity: 267 m^{3}/s (349 cu yd/s)

Reservoir
- Total capacity: 449,220,000 m^{3} (587,560,000 cu yd)
- Catchment area: 432.3 km^{2} (166.9 mi^{2})
- Surface area: 22 km^{2} (8.5 mi^{2})
- Maximum water depth: 57.75 m (189.5 ft)

Dospat Reservoir (Bulgarian: язовир Доспат) is situated in the western part of the Rhodope Mountains, Bulgaria. The reservoir (formed by a dam in the town of Dospat, 82 km (51 mi) west of Smolyan) stretches nearly 19 km (12 mi) northwest to the city of Sarnitsa. At 1,200 m (3,900 ft) above the sea level, it is one of the highest dams in Bulgaria in terms of altitude, and, with its 22 km^{2} (8.5 mi^{2}) of water area, the second largest in capacity. It is fed by the Dospat River.

The dam, which creates the lake, is built for hydroelectricity generation as part of the Dospat–Vacha Hydropower Cascade (500.2 MW). There is no hydroelectric power plant (HPP) installed at the dam but rather the water is taken to the Teshel HPP and then further down the Devin HPP and the Vacha River with its power plants, dams and reservoirs (Tsankov Kamak HPP, Vacha Reservoir, Krichim Reservoir, Vacha II HPP, Krichim HPP and Vacha I HPP). Besides that, a minimum of 0.15 m^{3}/s (0.20 cu yd/s) is constantly released for sanitation of the Dospat River riverbed where the average input to the reservoir is 7.9 m^{3}/s (10.3 cu yd/s).

The flora and fauna around the reservoir are diverse and the geography offers breathtaking sights. Old coniferous forests surround the lake. On the northern bank, the town of Sarnitsa and Krushata neighborhood are located. The terrain is hilly, with meadows and arable land available, used for grazing, potato growing and other agricultural activities. Parallel to the south bank are steep slopes covered in spruce and this bank is where most holiday cabins and hotels are located.

The reservoir is rich in fish. It is stocked with perch, trout (rainbow, brown, brook), carp, European chub, common rudd, common roach, pumpkinseed, wels catfish, Danube Bleak and various members of Carassius. Trout are reared in cages within the reservoir. Most types of fishing are practiced: spinning with lures, fly fishing, and others.

In the surrounding areas there are a number of other large dams, including Vacha, Golyam Beglik, Batak and Shiroka Polyana. The area offers great opportunities for recreation and tourism.

Accessibility is, however, rather poor. Four main mountain roads link the reservoir to the rest of the world. One from Batak, a second from Velingrad to Sarnitsa, a third from Devin and a fourth from Gotse Delchev to the town of Dospat. The one from Batak allows accessibility to some of the other Rhodope dams along its length. It forks into two roads; one leading to the town of Dospat and the other to Sarnitsa. This road to Sarnitsa is in places very rutted and may prove a challenge to navigate. Along the south bank there runs a rough dirt track from Sarnitsa to Dospat but this is only used to access the holiday spots.

== Gallery ==
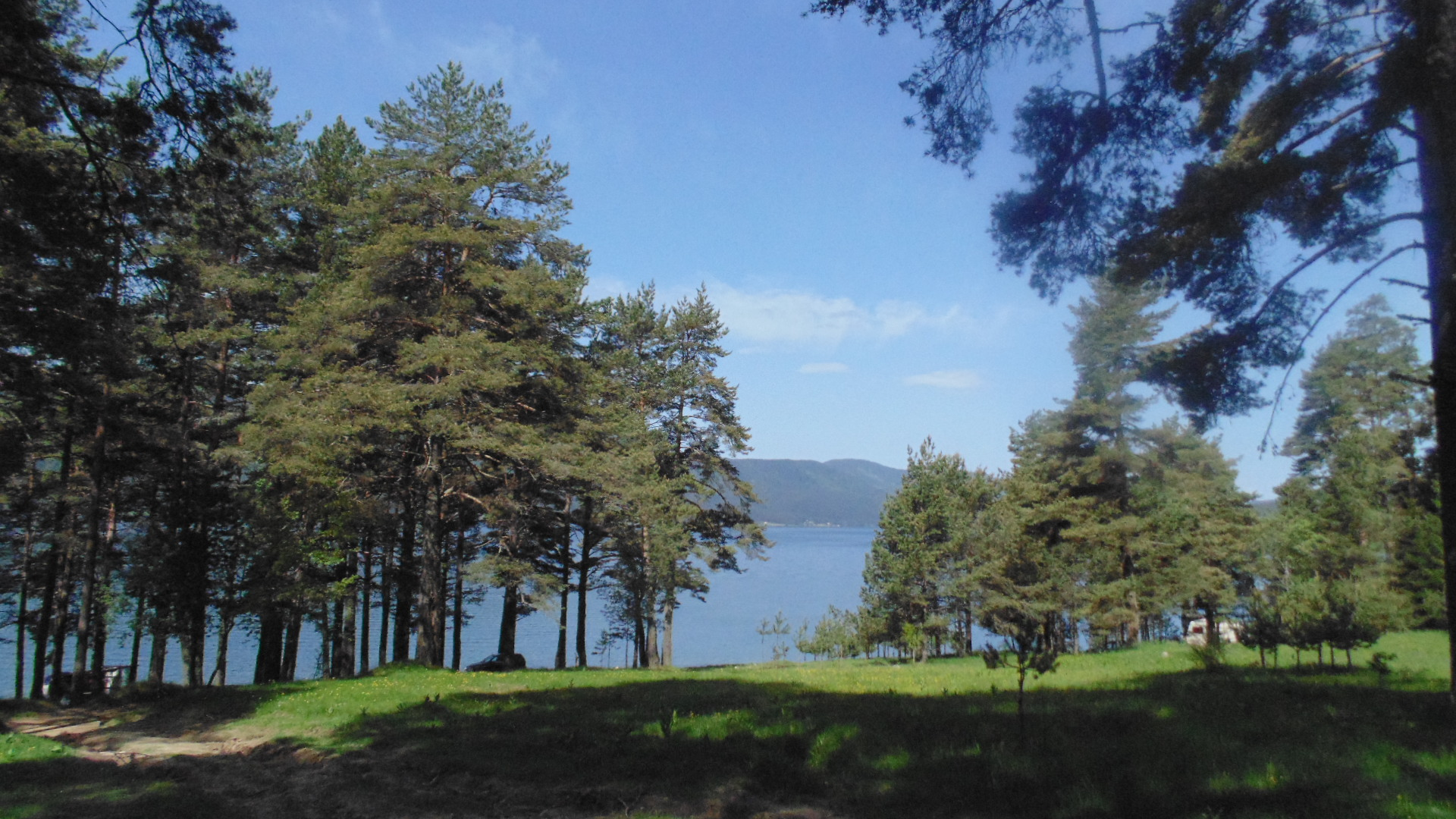

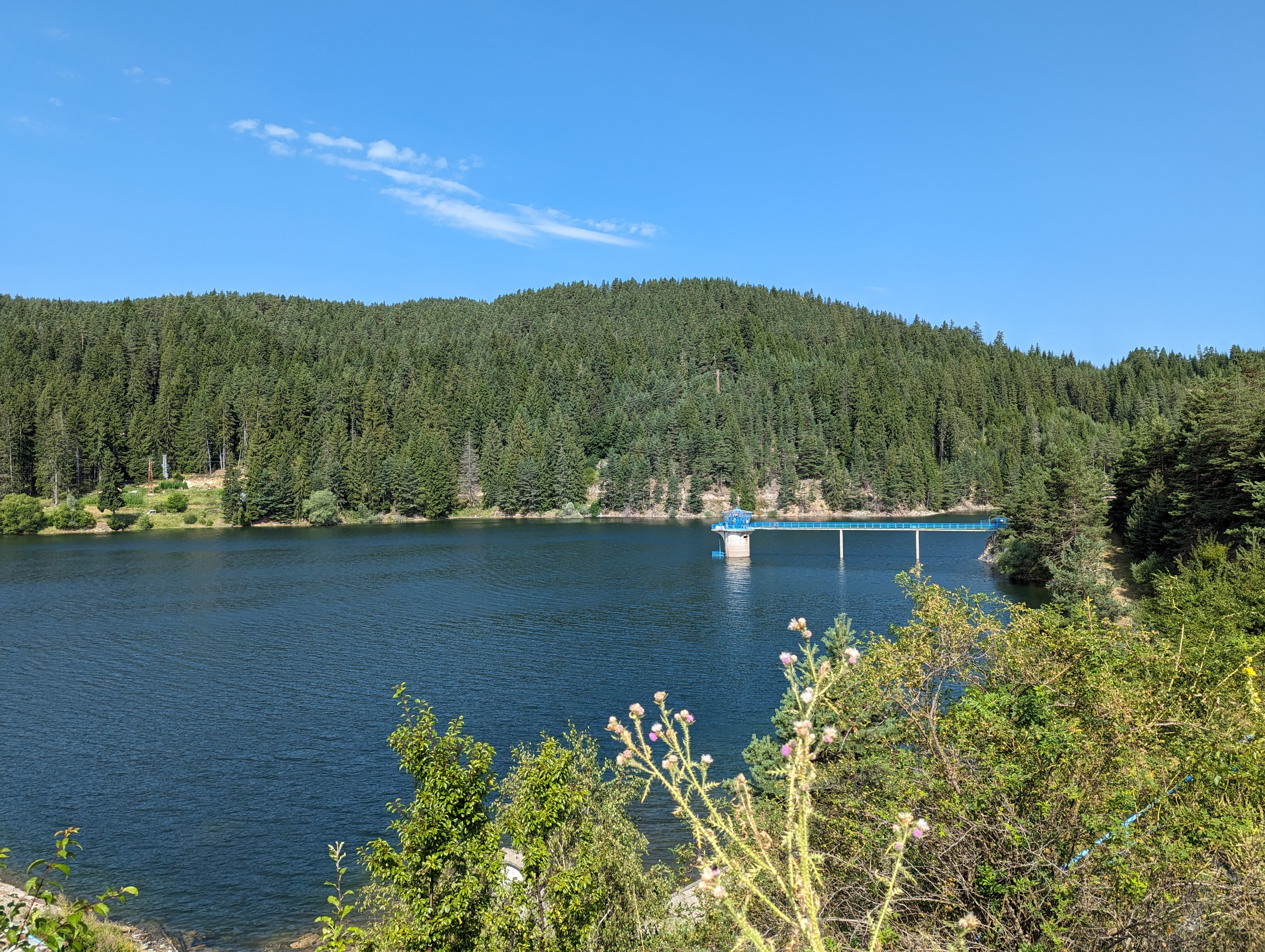

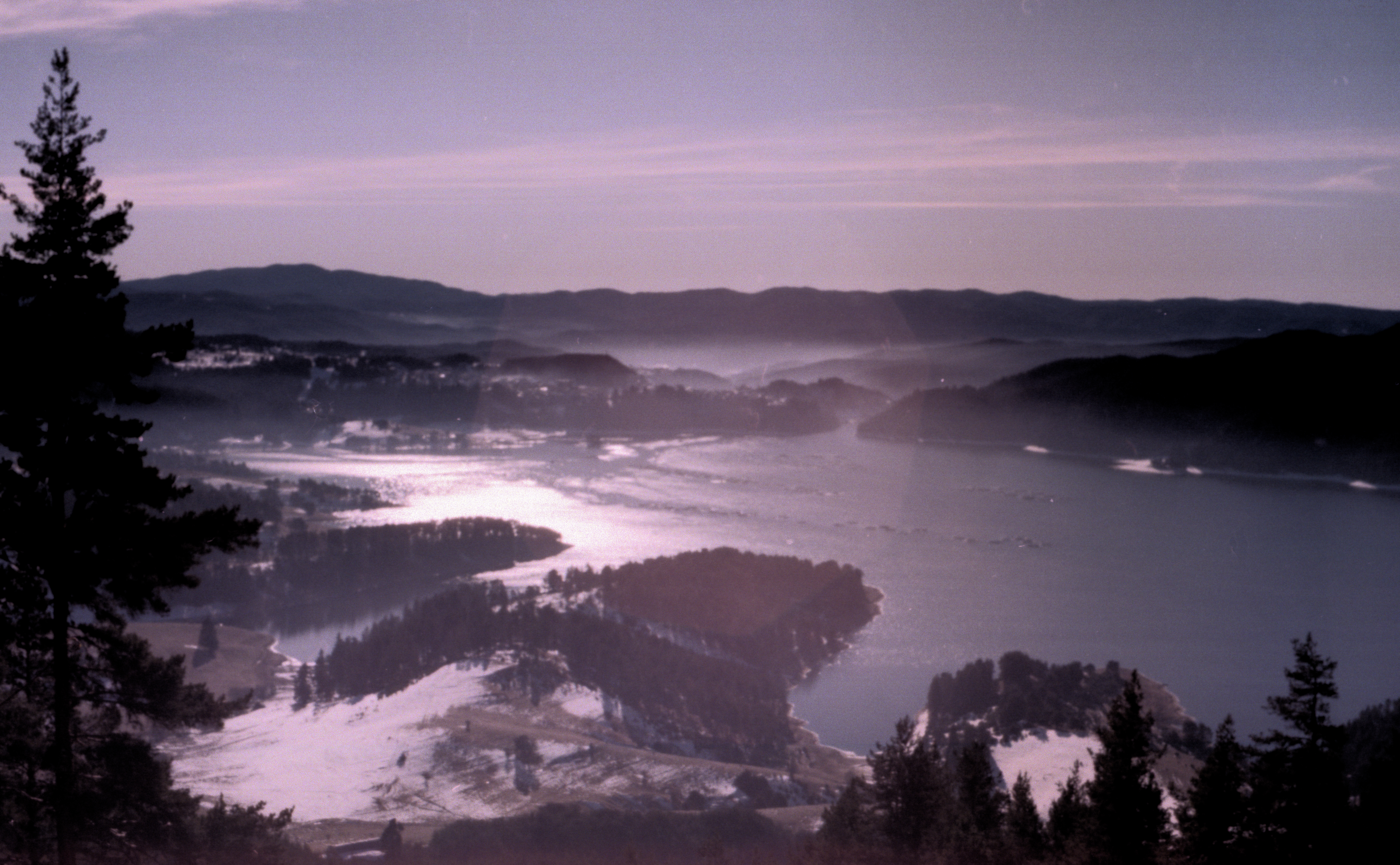

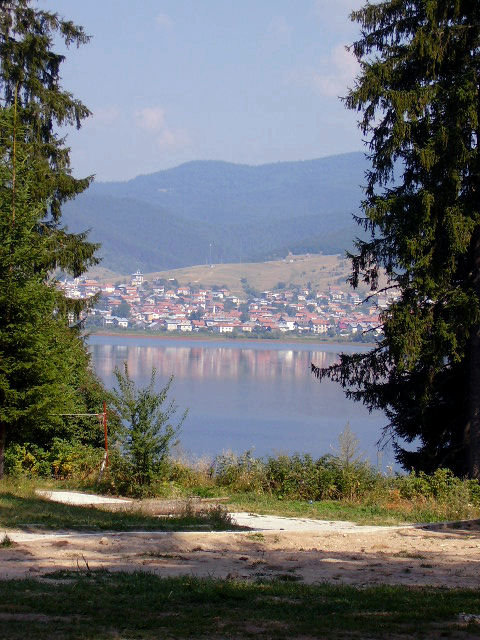

== See also ==
- Reservoirs and dams in Bulgaria
