= Pobit Kamak, Pazardzhik Province =

Pobit Kamak Побит камък
- Village
- Location of Pobit Kamak
- Coordinates: 41°49′28.16″N 23°53′8.1″E
- Country: Bulgaria
- Provinces (Oblast): Pazardzhik Province
- Municipality (Obshtina): Sarnitsa Municipality

Area
  - Total: 47.684 km^{2} (18.411 sq mi)
- Elevation: 1,271 m (4,170 ft)

Population
  - Total: 641
  - Density: 13.4/km^{2} (34.8/sq mi)
- Time zone: UTC+2 (EET)
  - Summer (DST): UTC+3 (EEST)
- Postal Code: 4638

Pobit Kamak (Bulgarian: Побит камък, romanized: Pobit kamak) is a village located in Sarnitsa Municipality, Pazardzhik Province, Southern Bulgaria. The population is 641.

== Geography ==
The village is situated on the western Rhodopes, a mountainous region, encompassing it on all sides. It is surrounded by mountain hills - to the south-west Divite kozi, while to the south - the 1938 metres high Beslet Peak.

== Religion ==
Islam is the predominant religion in the village.
