= Dospat Municipality =

Coordinates: 41°38′37″N 24°9′35″E

Dospat Municipality Община Доспат
- Municipality
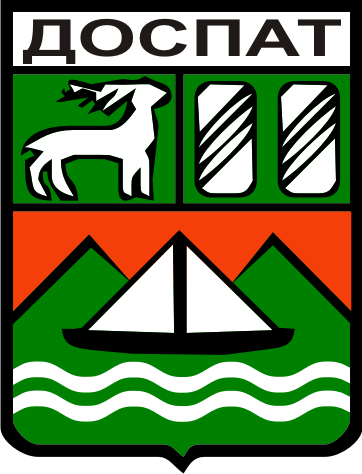
- Coat of arms
- Interactive map of Dospat Municipality
- Country: Bulgaria
- Province: Smolyan Province
- Seat: Dospat

The Dospat Municipality is a municipality in southwestern Bulgaria and is one of the municipalities in the Smolyan Province.

== Geography ==
It covers the southwestern Rhodope Mountains. 8 settlements belong to the municipality with a total of 8217 in 2016.

== Demography ==
The municipality of Dospat lost a large part of its population since the fall of communism in Bulgaria, due to emigration and more recently due to negative growth rate. As of 018, the municipality of Dospat had 7,932 inhabitants, down from 10,489 inhabitants in 1992. There were 64 children born in 2016, down from 91 compared to five years earlier. The number of deaths is 89 as of 2016, down from 105 in 2011. The natural population growth is minus 25 people, nearly double as many compared to minus 14 people in 2011.

=== Religion ===
Nearly half of the population did not answer the question on their religion; only a slight majority did answer the question. Of those people only 55 are Orthodox Christians, while the other part declared to be Muslim. That means that nearly all of the inhabitants with a religion are Muslims, especially Bulgarian Muslims or the so-called Pomaks (89.0%) as Dospat is predominantly inhabited by ethnic Bulgarians. Around 8.7% of the population preferred not to answer and a further 1.1% had no religion.

Population of Dospat Municipality by religion
Orthodox	0.6%
Muslims	46.4%
No religion	5.1%
Prefer not to answer	47.9%

== Settlements in the municipality ==
- Barutin
- Brashten
- Chavdar
- Dospat
- Kasak
- Ljubcha
- Tsrancha
- Zmeitsa
