= List of villages in Smolyan Province =

This is a list of villages in Smolyan Province, Bulgaria.

- Alamovtsi
- Aligovska
- Arda
- Banite
- Barutin
- Belev Dol
- Bilyanska
- Borikovo
- Bostina
- Brashten
- Bukata
- Bukatsite
- Chamla
- Chavdar
- Chepleten
- Chereshkite
- Chereshovo
- Chereshovska Reka
- Chokmanovo
- Chuchur
- Davidkovo
- Dimovo
- Dolen
- Erma Reka
- Gyovren
- Kasak
- Kushla
- Lyubcha
- Mogilitsa
- Momchilovtsi
- Shiroka Laka
- Smilyan
- Startsevo
- Tsrancha
- Vievo
- Zmeitsa

== See also ==
- List of villages in Bulgaria
