= Radka Kushleva =

Bulgarian folklore singer

Bulgarian Folklore Singer Radka Kushleva
- Born: 26 July 1926; Shiroka Laka, Bulgaria
- Died: 17 April 1984 (aged 57)
- Style: Folklore music
- Relatives: Sestri Kushlevi, Georgi Chilingirov, Stefka Kushleva

Radka Kushleva (26 July 1926 – 17 April 1984) was a Bulgarian folklore singer, performer of Rhodope folklore.

== Biography ==
Radka Kushleva was born in a family of singers and bagpipers on 26 July 1926. Around 1940 she was a student in Sofia's business school. She has three sisters – Anka, Stefka, and Maria. Stefka Kushleva, of which is a famous Bulgarian folklore singer.

== Career ==
Her first appearance on the folklore scene as a musician was in early 1942, then her voice was heard on Bulgarian national radio – Radio Sofia.The first songs she performs on the radio were "Bela sam...", "Zaspalo e Chelebiishe", "Rado, mari, byala rado" and others. During the 1950s she records more than 70 original Rhodopean folklore songs, the majority of which in the Golden fond of the Bulgarian National Radio.

Together with her sisters, Anka and Stefka Kushleva, the three create a vocal quartet – "Sestri Kushlevi". Together they perform a lot of songs and records in all over Bulgaria and the world. This is the first ever vocal quartet in Bulgaria, that performs folklore music. A few years later, the quarter becomes a sextet. The two daughters of Radka join them to sing – Sonya and Didi.

The sextet successfully records a few gramophone records in Balkanton. It also becomes the first group of singers to recreate the traditional Bulgarian folklore songs of "Dilmano Dilbero" and "Grozde", along with Emil Dimitrov.

In 2020, in her honor, in Smolyan, Rhodope Mountain, a statue in her form was raised by the Municipality.

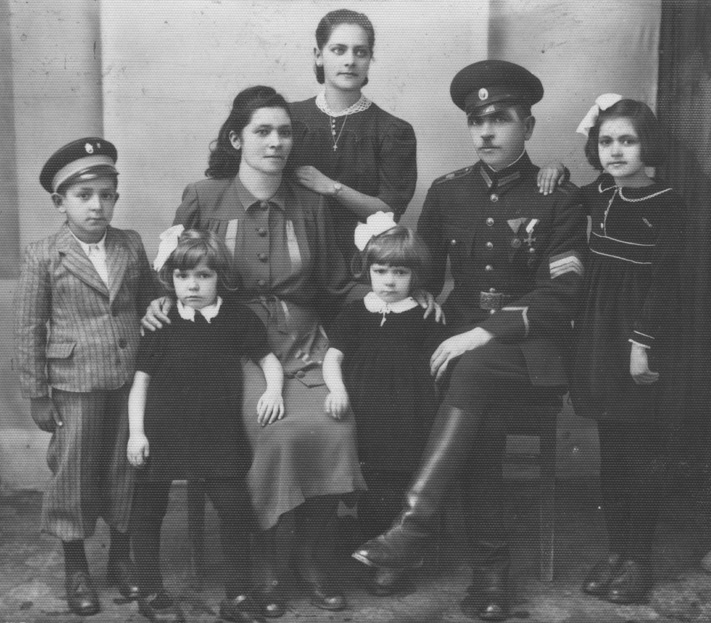
The Kushlevi Family in Skopje, 1943
