= Davidkovo =

A house in Davidkovo bought by a Scottish family in 2004 currently being renovated

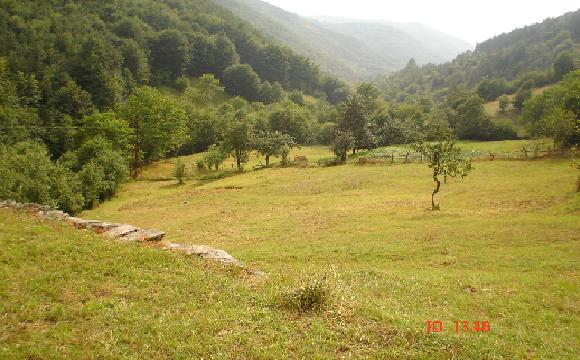
Photograph of Davidkovo scenery

Photograph of a Davidkovo local and his cow

Davidkovo (Bulgarian: Давидково) is a village in the Central Rhodope Mountains of southernmost Bulgaria, part of Banite Municipality, Smolyan Province.

As of September 2006 it has a population of 971 and the mayor is Velin Glushkov. Davidkovo lies at 41°40′N 24°58′E, at around 1000 m above sea level. The distance to Banite is 15 km, to Smolyan — 66 km, and to the capital city Sofia — 177 km.

The village has a mixed population of Eastern Orthodox and Muslim Bulgarians. A landmark in the vicinity is Svoboda Peak 13 km to the north, which is an ancient sacred site today worshipped by the Muslim population as the final resting place of the legendary hero Enihan Baba.

Davidkovo has a Bulgarian Orthodox church — the Church of Saint Elijah the Prophet, which is a cultural monument of local importance, and a mosque.

Davidkovo is the crosspoint of different cultural influences. An ancient custom named Davidkovska Poprelka is continuing to this day and the local Rhodopean folk dress is regarded as particularly colourful and beautiful. Davidkovo, as part of the Rhodopes, is also known for its particular folk music.
