= Starcevo =

Starcevo may refer to:

- Starčevo, a town in Serbia
- Starčevo (Petrovac), a village in Serbia
- Starchevo, a village in Bulgaria
- Starčevo culture, a Neolithic culture of Europe

== See also ==
- Startsevo (disambiguation)
