= Bukata =

Bukata may refer to several places:

- Buq'ata, Golan Heights
- Bukata, Bulgaria

Bukata is a Yoruba term(a south-western tribe in Nigeria) for responsibilities.
