= Startsevo =

Startsevo may refer to:

- Startsevo, Bulgaria, a village in Smolyan Province, Bulgaria
- Startsevo, Russia, several rural localities in Russia
