= Aligovska =

- Location in Bulgaria
- Coordinates: 41°27′N 24°38′E
- Country: Bulgaria
- Provinces of Bulgaria: Smolyan Province
- Municipality: Smolyan Municipality

Population (2007)
  - Total: 44,444
- Time zone: UTC+2 (Eastern European Time)

Aligovska (Bulgarian: Алиговска) is a village in Smolyan Municipality, located in the Smolyan Province of southern Bulgaria. It is located 174.91 km from Sofia. As of 2007, the village has a population of 15 people.
