= Nedelino =

Nedelino Неделино
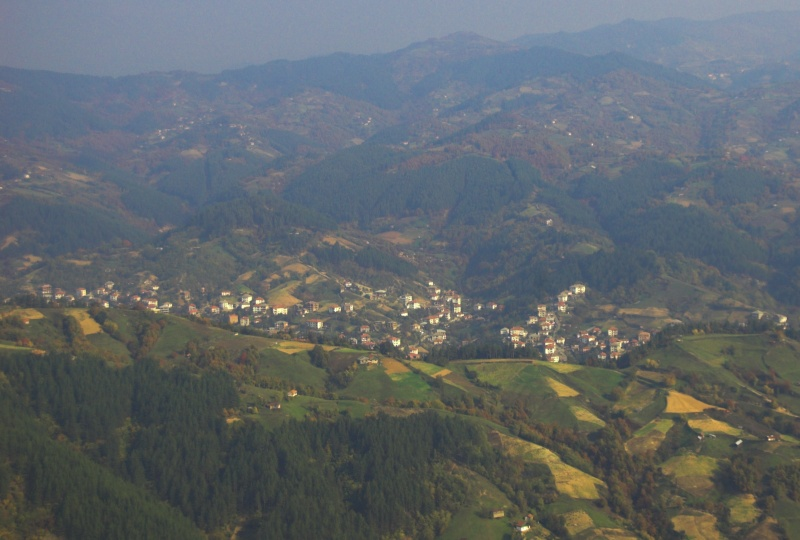

- Location of Nedelino
- Coordinates: 41°27′N 25°05′E
- Country: Bulgaria
- Province (Oblast): Smolyan

Government
  - Mayor: Boyan Kehayov

Area
  - Total: 4,333 km^{2} (1,673 sq mi)
- Elevation: 526 m (1,726 ft)
- Time zone: UTC+2 (EET)
  - Summer (DST): UTC+3 (EEST)
- Postal Code: 4990
- Area code: 03072

Nedelino (Bulgarian: Неделино [nɛˈdɛlino]) is a town and municipality in the Rhodope Mountains of the Smolyan Province, southern Bulgaria. The former name of Nedelino was Uzundere (until 1934), which means "Long Creek".

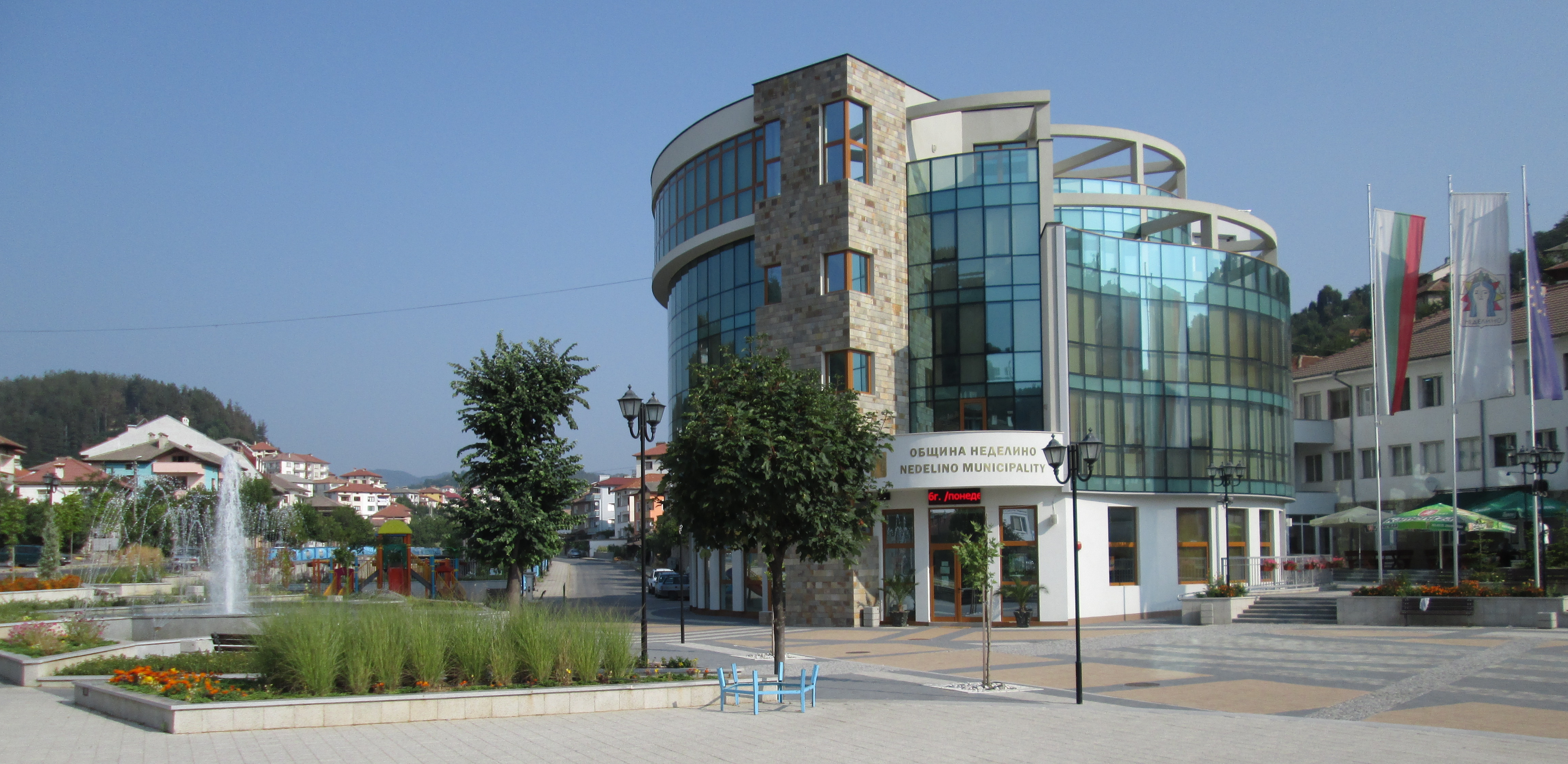
Municipality building in Nedelino

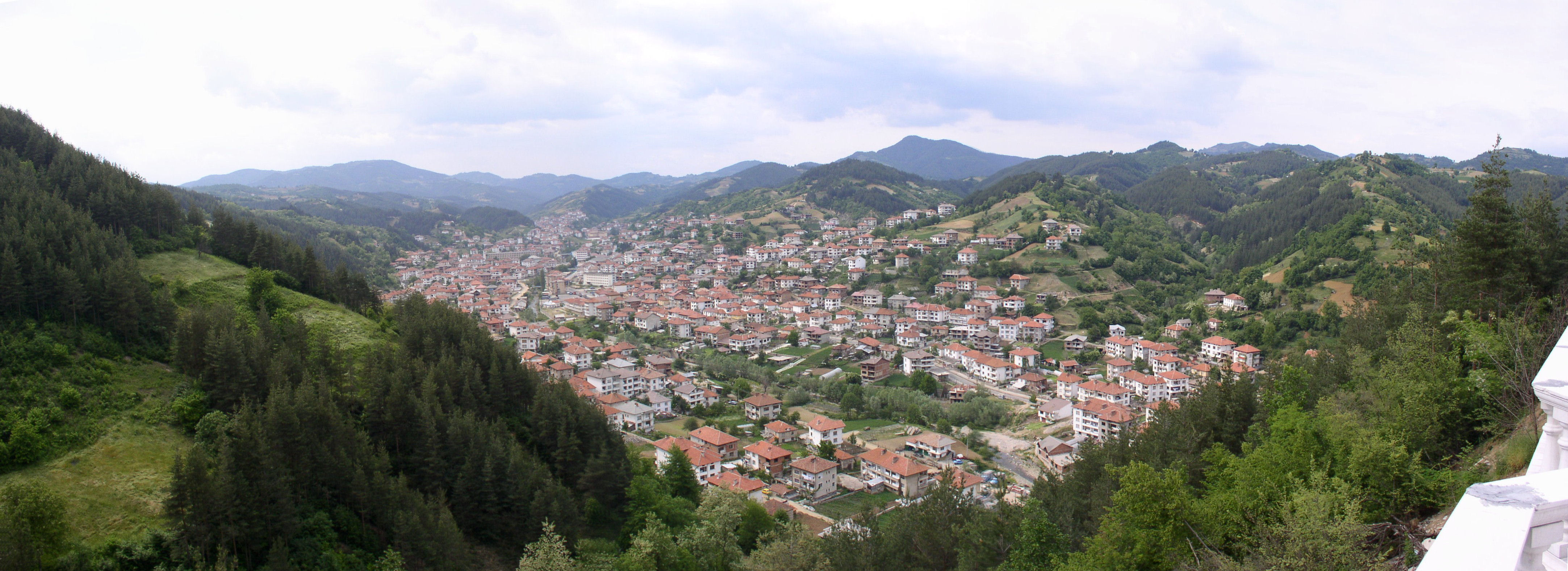
Nedelino, panorama 2004
