= Chereshovo, Smolyan Province =

Chereshovo Черешово
- Village
- Location in Bulgaria
- Coordinates: 41°31′N 24°39′E
- Country: Bulgaria
- Province: Smolyan Province
- Municipality: Smolyan
- Elevation: 3,068 ft (935 m)

Population (2015)
  - Total: 8
- Time zone: UTC+2 (EET)
- Postal code: 4772
- Area code: 0306
- Vehicle registration: СМ

Chereshovo (Bulgarian: Черешово) is a village in the municipality of Smolyan, located in the Smolyan Province of southern Bulgaria. The village is located 170 km from Sofia. As of 2007, the village had a population of 13 people.

== Geography ==
The village is located in a mountainous region.

== History ==
The Ottoman register of 1841 says that a soldier enlisted in the army from Chereshovo (at that time called Kirazli), which gives evidence of Muslims living there. In 1903, there were 15 houses. According to Lyubomir Miletich, in 1912, the entire population of Chereshovo consisted of Bulgarian Muslims. The number of Muslims during 1912-13 were 110.
