= Dolen, Smolyan Province =

Coordinates: 41.424°N 25.134°E

- Interactive map of Dolen, Smolyan Province

Dolen (Bulgarian: Долен) is a village in southern Bulgaria located in the Zlatograd municipality of the Smolyan Province. It is located near the Greek border. In summer 2006 an ethnological expedition was carried out in the village.
