= Bukatsite =

Bukatsite Букаците
- Village
- Location in Bulgaria
- Coordinates: 41°28′N 24°44′E
- Country: Bulgaria
- Province: Smolyan Province
- Municipality: Smolyan

Area
  - Total: 3,880 sq mi (10,048 km^{2})
- Elevation: 3,524 ft (1,074 m)

Population (2015)
  - Total: 52
- Time zone: UTC+2 (EET)
- Post code: 4782
- Area code: 03026

Bukatsite (Bulgarian: Букаците) is a village in the municipality of Smolyan, located in the Smolyan Province of southern Bulgaria. The village covers an area of 10.048 km^{2} and is located 171.46 km from Sofia. As of 2007, the village had a population of 44 people.
