= Chereshkite =

- Location in Bulgaria
- Coordinates: 41°30′N 24°35′E
- Country: Bulgaria
- Province: Smolyan Province
- Municipality: Smolyan

Population (2007)
  - Total: 14
- Time zone: UTC+2 (EET)

Chereshkite (Bulgarian: Черешките) is a village in the municipality of Smolyan, located in the Smolyan Province of southern Bulgaria. The village is located 167.965 km from Sofia. As of 2007, the village had a population of 14 people.
