= Dimovo, Smolyan Province =

Dimovo
- Location in Bulgaria
- Coordinates: 41°32′N 24°37′E
- Country: Bulgaria
- Province: Smolyan Province
- Municipality: Smolyan

Population (2007)
  - Total: 11
- Time zone: UTC+2 (EET)

Dimovo (Bulgarian: Димово) is a small village in the municipality of Smolyan, located in the Smolyan Province of southern Bulgaria. The village is located 166.88 km from Sofia. As of 2007, the village had a population of 11 people.
