= Startsevo, Russia =

Startsevo (Russian: Старцево) is the name of several rural localities in Russia.

== Modern localities ==
- Startsevo, Belgorod Oblast, a selo in Lavinsky Rural Okrug of Valuysky District of Belgorod Oblast
- Startsevo, Ivanovo Oblast, a village in Vichugsky District of Ivanovo Oblast
- Startsevo, Kirov Oblast, a settlement under the administrative jurisdiction of the urban-type settlement of Rudnichny in Verkhnekamsky District of Kirov Oblast
- Startsevo, Krasnoyarsk Krai, a village in Shuvayevsky Selsoviet of Yemelyanovsky District of Krasnoyarsk Krai
- Startsevo, Brilyakovsky Selsoviet, Gorodetsky District, Nizhny Novgorod Oblast, a village in Brilyakovsky Selsoviet of Gorodetsky District of Nizhny Novgorod Oblast
- Startsevo, Nikolo-Pogostinsky Selsoviet, Gorodetsky District, Nizhny Novgorod Oblast, a village in Nikolo-Pogostinsky Selsoviet of Gorodetsky District of Nizhny Novgorod Oblast
- Startsevo, Koverninsky District, Nizhny Novgorod Oblast, a village in Gavrilovsky Selsoviet of Koverninsky District of Nizhny Novgorod Oblast
- Startsevo, Sokolsky District, Nizhny Novgorod Oblast, a village in Loyminsky Selsoviet of Sokolsky District of Nizhny Novgorod Oblast
- Startsevo, Oryol Oblast, a village in Platonovsky Selsoviet of Orlovsky District of Oryol Oblast
- Startsevo, Perm Krai, a village in Nytvensky District of Perm Krai
- Startsevo, Pskov Oblast, a village in Bezhanitsky District of Pskov Oblast
- Startsevo, Tver Oblast, a village in Uspenskoye Rural Settlement of Rzhevsky District of Tver Oblast
- Startsevo, Kirillovsky District, Vologda Oblast, a village in Migachevsky Selsoviet of Kirillovsky District of Vologda Oblast
- Startsevo, Vytegorsky District, Vologda Oblast, a village in Almozersky Selsoviet of Vytegorsky District of Vologda Oblast

== Abolished localities ==
- Startsevo, Balakhninsky District, Nizhny Novgorod Oblast, a village in Konevsky Selsoviet of Balakhninsky District of Nizhny Novgorod Oblast; abolished in February 2013
