= Bostina =

Bostina Бостина
- Village
- Location in Bulgaria
- Coordinates: 41°37′N 24°46′E
- Country: Bulgaria
- Province: Smolyan Province
- Municipality: Smolyan

Area
  - Total: 1,842 sq mi (4,771 km^{2})
- Elevation: 3,050 ft (930 m)

Population (2007)
  - Total: 125
- Time zone: UTC+2 (EET)
- Postal Code: 4745
- Area code: 03019

Bostina (Bulgarian: Бостина) is a village in the municipality of Smolyan, located in the Smolyan Province of southern Bulgaria. The village covers an area of 4.77 km^{2} (1.84 sq mi) and is located 168.3 km (104.6 mi) from Sofia. In 2007, the village had a population of 125.
