= Momchilovtsi (drink) =

Chinese drinkable yogurt brand

Momchilovtsi (Chinese: 莫斯利安; pinyin: Mòsīlì’ān) is a Chinese brand of drinkable yogurt produced by Bright Dairy & Food (光明乳业股份有限公司), a company in Shanghai. Made from Lactobacillus bulgaricus imported from Bulgaria, it was inspired by the yogurt in the village of Momchilovtsi, Bulgaria.

== History ==
In 2008, a group of people from Bright Dairy wishing to establish yogurt-making operations came to Momchilovtsi.

Production of the yogurt began in December 2010. As of 2015, sales consisted of 3.22 billion renminbi and made up 20% of the total operating revenue of Bright Dairy & Food.
