= Borikovo =

- Location in Bulgaria
- Coordinates: 41°29′N 24°37′E
- Country: Bulgaria
- Province: Smolyan Province
- Municipality: Smolyan

Population (2013)
  - Total: 33
- Time zone: UTC+2 (EET)

Borikovo (Bulgarian: Бориково) is a village in the municipality of Smolyan, located in the Smolyan Province of southern Bulgaria. The village covers an area of 22.267 km^{2} and is located 171.2 km from Sofia. As of 2013, the village had a population of 33 .
