= Belev dol =

- Location in Bulgaria
- Coordinates: 41°37′N 24°56′E
- Country: Bulgaria
- Province: Smolyan Province
- Municipality: Smolyan Municipality

Population (2007)
  - Total: 87
- Time zone: UTC+2 (Eastern European Time)

Belev dol (Bulgarian: Белев дол) is a village in Smolyan Municipality, located in the Smolyan Province of southern Bulgaria. The village covers an area of 3.764 km^{2} and is located 178.3 km from Sofia. As of 2007, the village had a population of 87 people.
