= Smilyan =

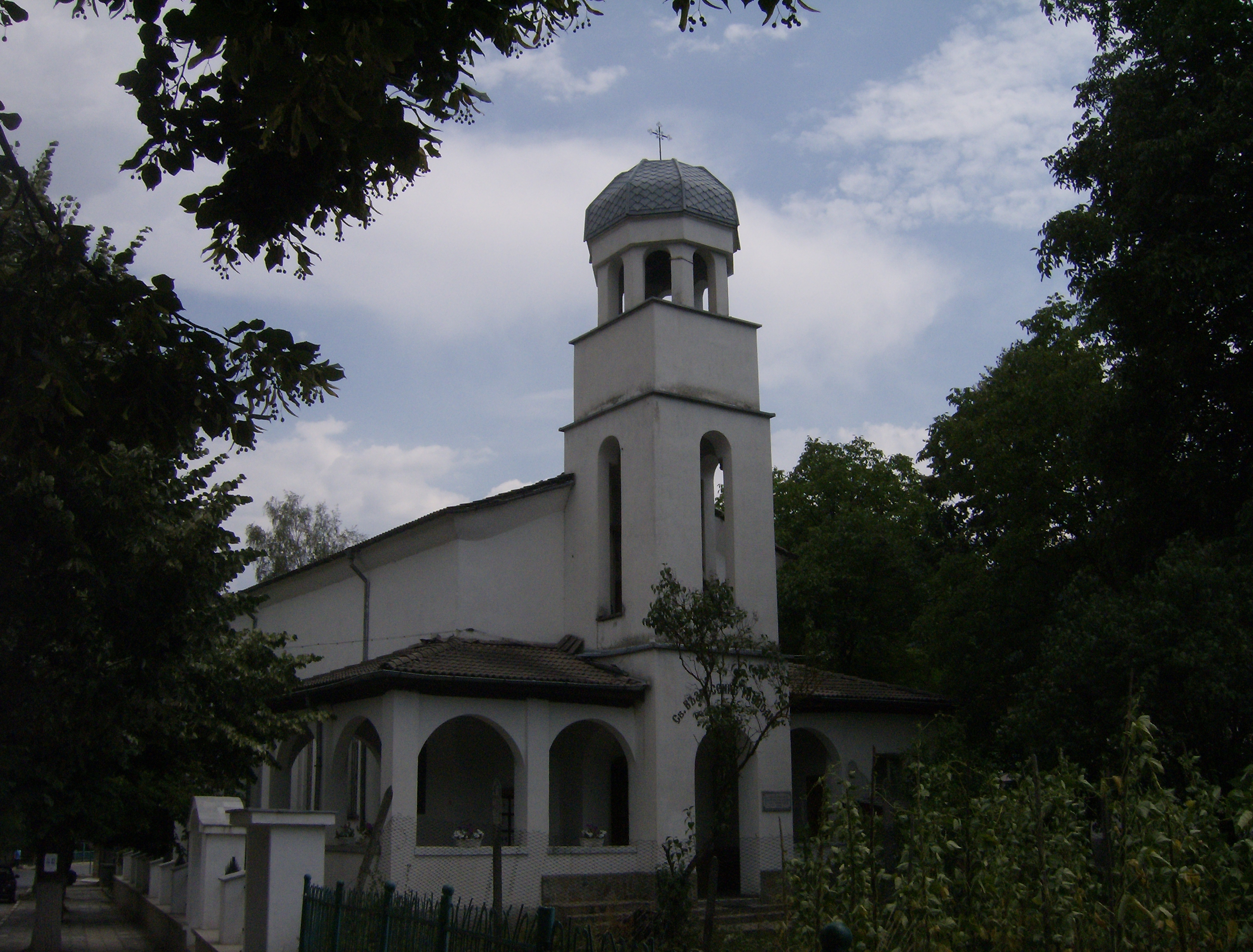
- Village church

- Location within Bulgaria
- Coordinates: 41°30′23″N 24°43′44″E

Population (2019)
  - Total: 1,583

Smilyan (Bulgarian: Смилян) is a village in Smolyan Municipality, located in the Smolyan Province of southern Bulgaria. It is located 176.862 km from Sofia and the village covers an area of 29.248 km2. As of 2019, the village had a population of 1583 people.

It is known for its premium quality beans, of which limited quantities are produced.

== Honours ==
Smilyan Bastion on Loubet Coast, Antarctica is named after the village.
