= Bilyanska =

- Location in Bulgaria
- Coordinates: 41°27′N 24°37′E
- Country: Bulgaria
- Province: Smolyan Province
- Municipality: Smolyan Municipality

Population (2007)
  - Total: 29
- Time zone: UTC+2 (Eastern European Time)

Bilyanska (Bulgarian: Билянска) is a village in Smolyan Municipality, located in the Smolyan Province of southern Bulgaria. The village is located 174.093 km from Sofia. As of 2007, the village had a population of 29 people.
