= Church of Saint Vissarion of Smolyan =

Church in Smolyan, Bulgaria

Coordinates: 41°34′31″N 24°42′30″E

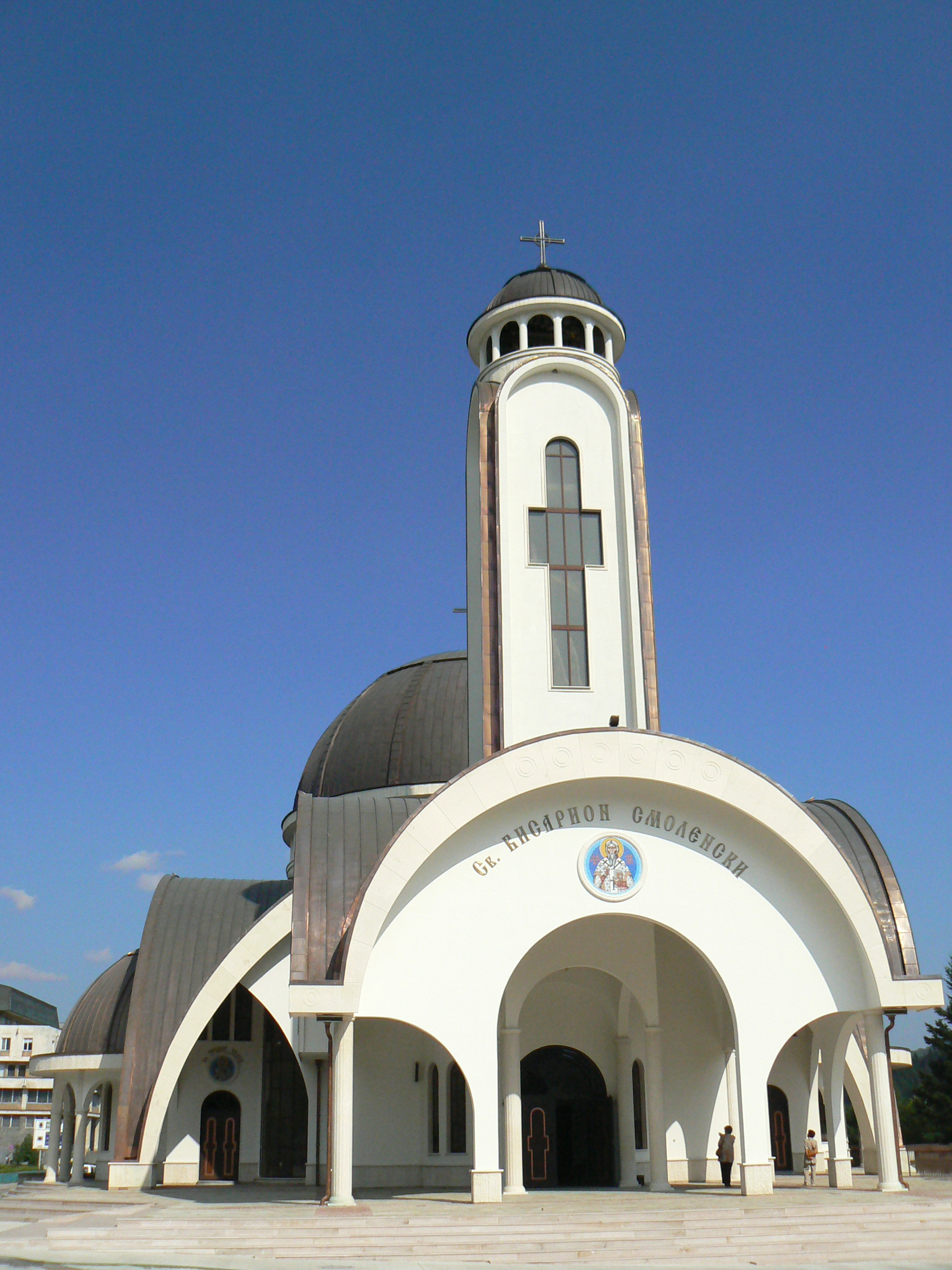
The Church of Saint Vissarion of Smolyan

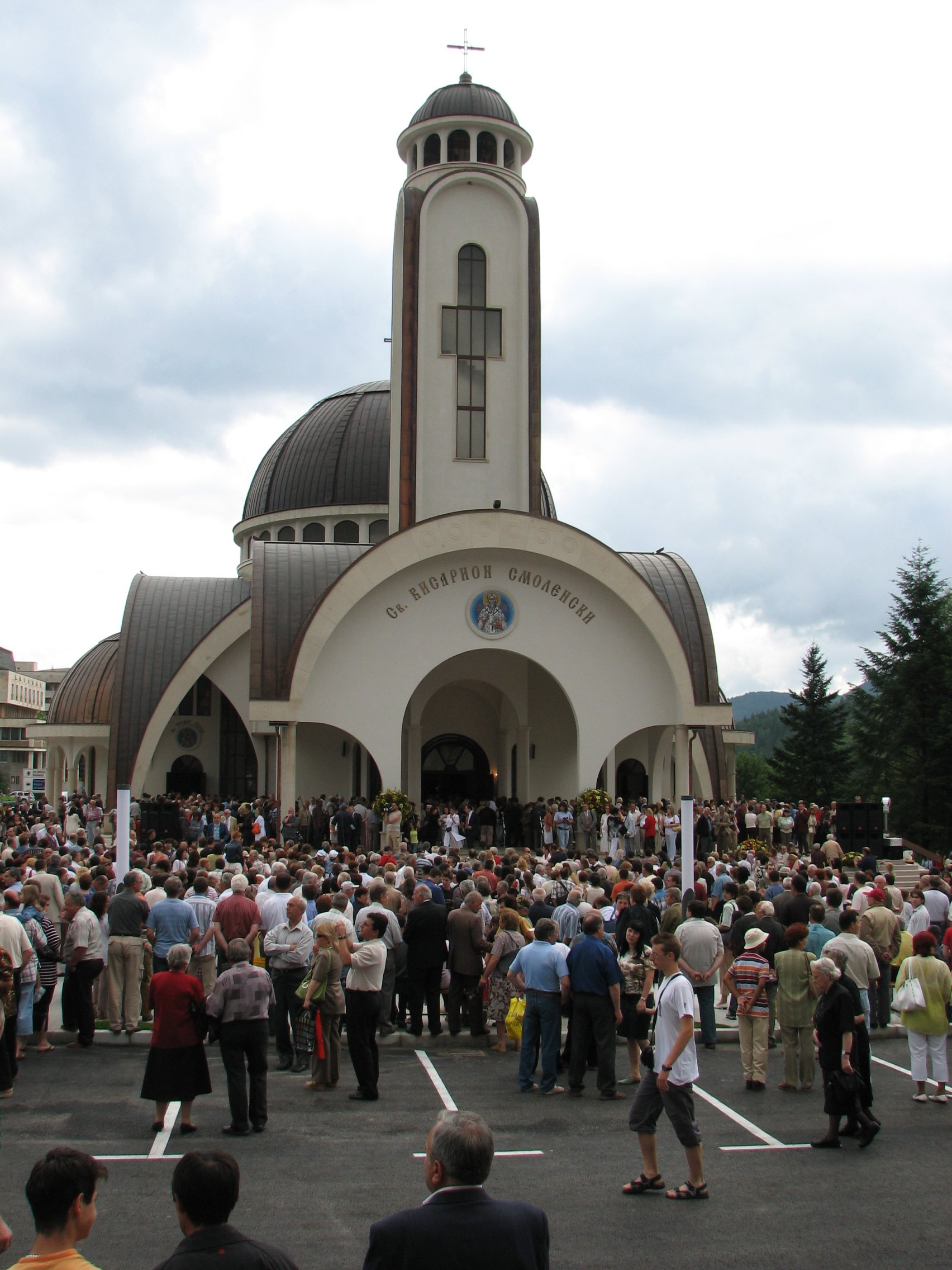
The church during its inauguration

The Church of Saint Vissarion of Smolyan (Bulgarian: храм „Свети Висарион Смолeнски") is an Eastern Orthodox church in Smolyan, Bulgaria, inaugurated on 2 July 2006.

Some people believe that it is the 2nd largest church in the country (after the Alexander Nevsky Cathedral in Sofia, St Dimitar Cathedral in Vidin and Dormition of the Theotokos Cathedral in Varna) and the largest church in Southern Bulgaria. It is the first new Orthodox church in the city in the Rhodopes for 130 years.

The church's main premise has an area of 382 m² (enough to accommodate 500 laymen), the dome being 17 m in diameter and the belfry reaching 32 m. The church's construction began with the laying of the foundation stone on 7 April 2002. Resources for the construction were gathered by raising money. The main church donor is Todor Batkov, a noted lawyer and PFC Levski Sofia president, who donated 2 million leva (circa €1 million).

The 11 bells, the largest of which being 152 cm high, 145 cm in diameter and weighing 2 tons, were cast in the Russian ZIL plant. The smallest bell weighs 60 kg, the total weight of all being 5 tons and the price of €92,000. The cladding of the domes and the rest of the roofing is made entirely of copper by a Bulgarian company - Kiprida.

Part of the church complex are also a baptistery (dedicated to Saint Theodore), a synodical library, a museum collection premise and a Sunday school.

Among the 5,000 guests who attended the church's inauguration were Prime Minister of Bulgaria Sergey Stanishev, Minister of Culture Stefan Danailov, politicians Anastasiya Mozer, Emel Etem, Petar Beron and Pavel Chernev.
