= Chereshovska Reka =

- Location in Bulgaria
- Coordinates: 41°30′N 24°39′E
- Country: Bulgaria
- Province: Smolyan Province
- Municipality: Smolyan

Population (2007)
  - Total: 15
- Time zone: UTC+2 (EET)

Chereshovska Reka (Bulgarian: Черешовска река) is a village in the municipality of Smolyan, located in the Smolyan Province of southern Bulgaria. The village is located 171.46 kilometres (106.54 mi) from Sofia. As of 2007, the village had a population of 15 people.
