= Kushla =

Coordinates: 41°19′N 25°10′E

Kushla (Кушла) is a village in southern Bulgaria, Zlatograd municipality, Smolyan Province, located near the border with Greece. In the Ottoman times the town was called Ugurli in Turkish and Kotyli in Greek. In 1918 the village was part of the Satres (bulg. Sinikovo) community. Following Greek and Bulgarian independence, the former town and its 350 families was divided between the countries in the Neuilly treaty in 1922 until 1941 when the Axis powers opened the borders briefly up to 1944 when Greece retook Kotyli and the local Bulgarian Muslims were since schooled in Greek language. The other part of the village lies in the Xanthi regional unit of Greece as Kotyli (Kozludzha). The villages have a Pomak (Bulgarian Muslim) majority.
