= Momchilovtsi =

Momchilovtsi Момчиловци
- Village
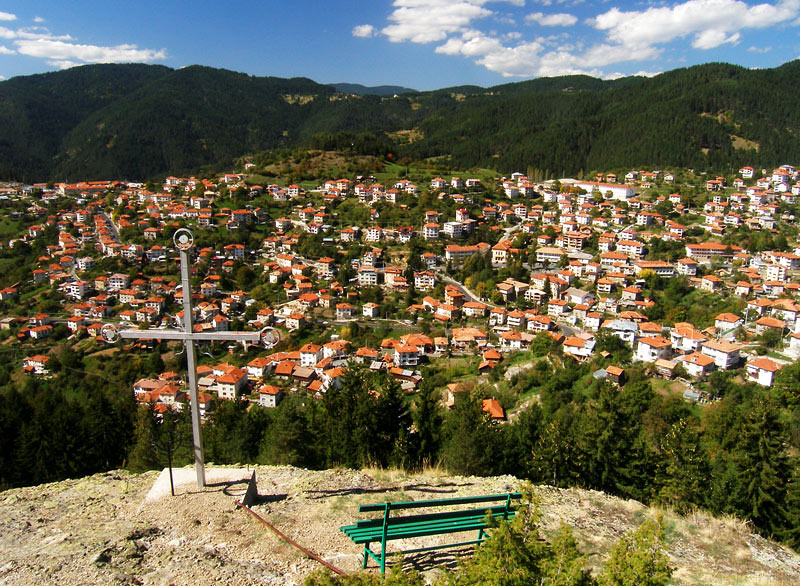

- Location within Bulgaria
- Coordinates: 41°39′32″N 24°46′28″E
- Country: Bulgaria
- Province: Smolyan Province
- Municipality: Smolyan

Government
  - Mayor: Siyka Surkova

Area
  - Total: 40.464 km^{2} (15.623 sq mi)
- Elevation: 1,200 m (3,900 ft)

Population (31-12-2013)
  - Total: 1,189
- Bulgaria Guide
- Time zone: UTC+2 (EET)
  - Summer (DST): UTC+3 (EEST)
- Postal Code: 4750

Momchilovtsi (Bulgarian: Момчиловци [momˈt͡ʃiɫoft͜si]) is a Bulgarian village and ski resort in the Central Rhodopes, about 15 km northeast of Smolyan. It has an ethnographic museum, an art gallery and a number of churches and chapels (24 in the village and the vicinity), the most famous of which is the SS. Constantine and Helen Church built in 1836. The houses, mostly large 2 or 3-storey buildings, are amphitheatrically set at 1,352 m above sea level.

The village also has a kindergarten and a school. Local children can attend classes until the 8th grade, after which most of them continue their education in the nearby town Smolyan. A number of educational activities and concerts are organized by the local culture centre - 'chitalishte Svetlina' - on a regular basis.

Thracian and Roman artifacts have been discovered close to the village. It is thought that it was founded by exiles from Raykovo (now part of Smolyan) that sought to escape forcible conversion to Islam by the Ottomans. The present village is named after Momchil Voyvoda, a medieval fighter against the Ottoman invasion that had a fortress in the area. Momchilvotsi is a large village compared to others in the Rhodopes, with 1,456 inhabitants as of 2005 and 550 houses, and has completely preserved its Christian character unlike many other villages in this mountainous part of the country.

In the 2000s Momchilvotsi began to establish itself as a centre of tourism, more specifically snowboarding and village tourism, with small family hotels and sports facilities being established.

The village's dairy production was the inspiration for the Chinese drinkable yogurt brand Momchilovtsi.
