= Chuchur =

- Location in Bulgaria
- Coordinates: 41°32′N 24°49′E
- Country: Bulgaria
- Province: Smolyan Province
- Municipality: Smolyan

Population (2007)
  - Total: 6
- Time zone: UTC+2 (EET)

Chuchur (Bulgarian: Чучур) is a hamlet in the municipality of Smolyan, located in the Smolyan Province of southern Bulgaria. The village is located 177.9 km from Sofia. As of 2007, the village had a population of 6 people.
