= Chepleten =

- Location in Bulgaria
- Coordinates: 41°28′N 24°45′E
- Country: Bulgaria
- Province: Smolyan Province
- Municipality: Smolyan

Population (2007)
  - Total: 67
- Time zone: UTC+2 (EET)

Chepleten (Bulgarian: Чеплетен) is a village in the municipality of Smolyan, located in the Smolyan Province of southern Bulgaria. The village covers an area of 6.76 km^{2} and is located 179.63 km from Sofia. As of 2007, the village had a population of 67 people.
