= Startsevo, Vytegorsky District, Vologda Oblast =

Startsevo Старцево
- Village
- Location within Vologda Oblast Location within Russia
- Coordinates: 60°47′N 36°46′E
- Country: Russia
- Region: Vologda Oblast
- District: Vytegorsky District
- Time zone: UTC+3:00

Startsevo (Russian: Старцево) is a rural locality (a village) in Almozerskoye Rural Settlement, Vytegorsky District, Vologda Oblast, Russia. The population was 1 as of 2002.

== Geography ==
Startsevo is located 43 km southeast of Vytegra (the district's administrative centre) by road. Veliky Dvor is the nearest rural locality.
