= Vievo =

Coordinates: 41.39°N 24.50°E

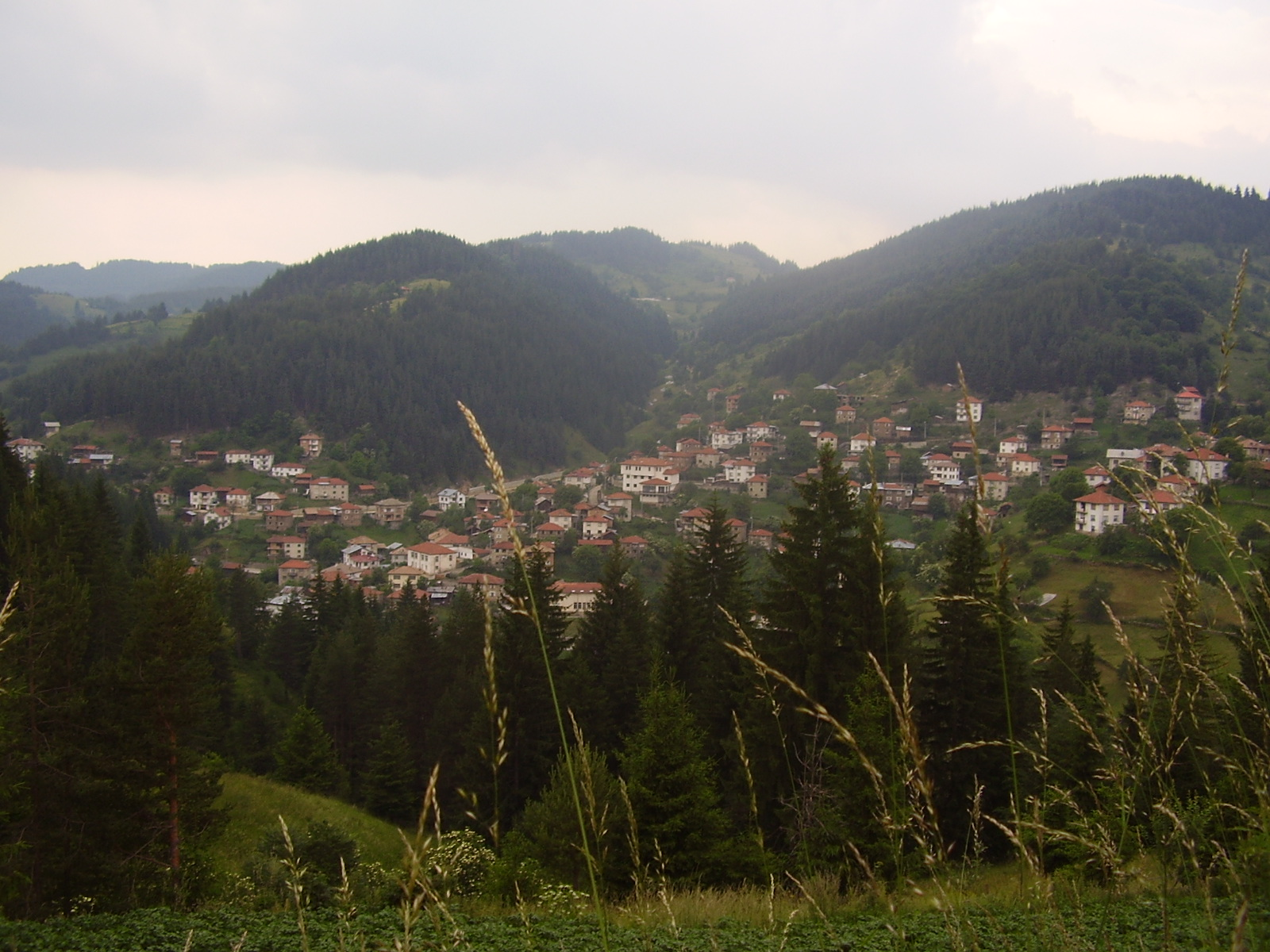
- Overlooking the village
- Interactive map of Vievo

Vievo is a village in the Rhodope Mountains in the Smolyan Province of Bulgaria.

== History ==
During the First Balkan War, the village was set on fire by the local Bulgarian militia to ethnically cleanse the Muslim population from the region. The remaining population took refuge in the nearby town of Chepelare. Most of the old inhabitants died in this town during the winter of 1913. Later former Vievo inhabitants again settled in the village and then dispersed to smaller valleys, tending to settle in a couple of houses clustering together. Some of the names are Chakalovo, Planina, and Livada.

Vievo was subject to the Communist regime's name change campaign during the 1970s and its huge wooden mosque was torn down by the communists in 1973.

== See also ==
- The Destruction of Thracian Bulgarians in 1913
- Second Balkan War
