= Smolyan =

- Town
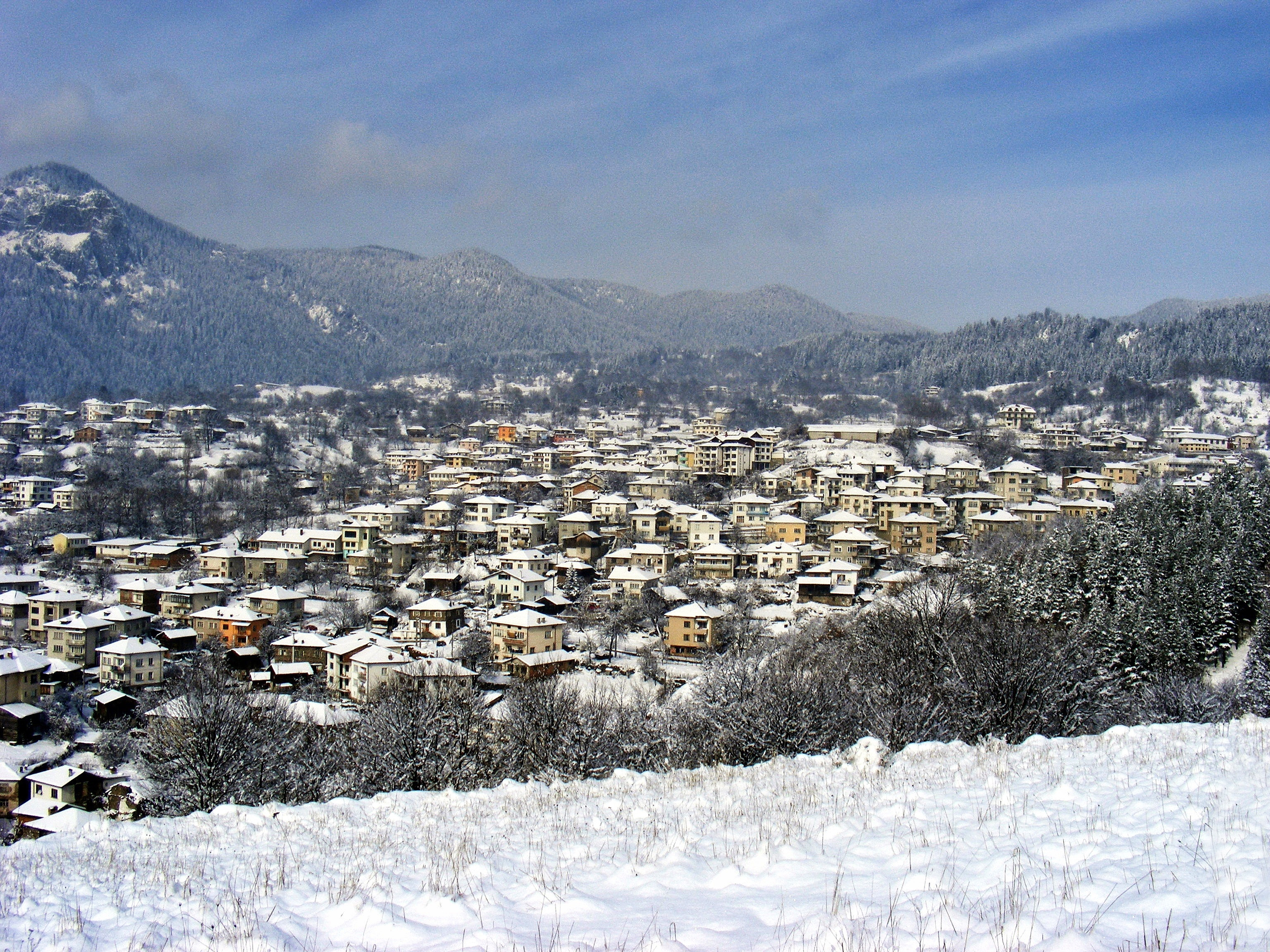

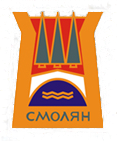
- Coat of arms

- Location of Smolyan
- Coordinates: 41°35′N 24°42′E
- Country: Bulgaria
- Province (Oblast): Smolyan

Government
  - Mayor: Nikolay Melemov (GERB)

Area
  - Town: 134.59 km^{2} (51.97 sq mi)
- Elevation: 1,002 m (3,287 ft)

Population (Census 2021)
  - Town: 30 689
  - Density: 0.22/km^{2} (0.58/sq mi)
  - Urban: 34,465
- Time zone: UTC+2 (EET)
  - Summer (DST): UTC+3 (EEST)
- Postal Code: 4700
- Area code: 0301
- Website: www.smolyan.bg

Smolyan (Bulgarian: Смолян) is a town and ski resort in the south of Bulgaria near the border with Greece. It is the administrative and industrial centre of the Smolyan Province. The town is built along the narrow valley of the Cherna ('black') and the Byala ('white') river in the central Rhodope Mountains. It is located at the foot of the mountain's highest peak Golyam Perelik (2,191 m). Popular ski resorts of Pamporovo and Chepelare lie in the vicinity. As of June 2022 the town has a population of 30,689 inhabitants.

== Name ==
The name of the town comes from the local Slavic tribe of the Smolyani, whose name is probably cognate to the Slavic word smola ("resin").

== History ==
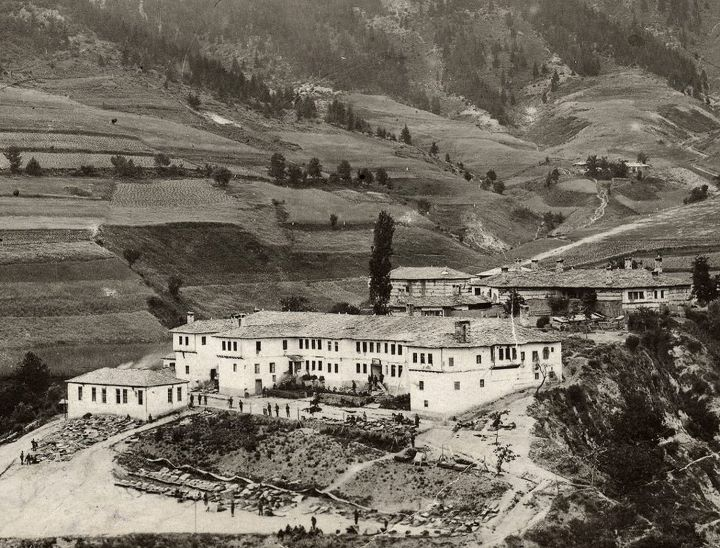
Salih Aga Pashmakli Residence

According to archaeological evidence, the area around Smolyan was first settled in the 2nd-1st millennium BC. In the Middle Ages it acquired its name from the Slavic tribe, the Smolyani, who settled in the region in the 7th century. During the Middle Ages, it was ruled by the Part of the Byzantine and Bulgarian Empires. For a while during the 14th century it came under the control of the Bulgarian feudal lord Momchil, alongside the whole Rhodope Mountains, before eventually being subjugated by the Ottoman Empire. During the Ottoman period the town was renamed to "Paşmaklı". It remained under Ottoman rule for five centuries, a township of the Ottoman Sanjak of Gümülcine in the Adrianople Vilayet between 1867 and 1912. It remained a Muslim-majority town with a large Christian minority until 1912.

The area was captured by the 21st Sredna Gora Regiment led by Vladimir Serafimov in 1912, during the First Balkan War. However, the town retained its Ottoman-era name "Paşmaklı" until 1934, when it was changed to "Smolyan" by official decree. The modern town of Smolyan was formed by the merger of three existing villages — Ustovo, Raykovo and Ezerovo — in 1960.

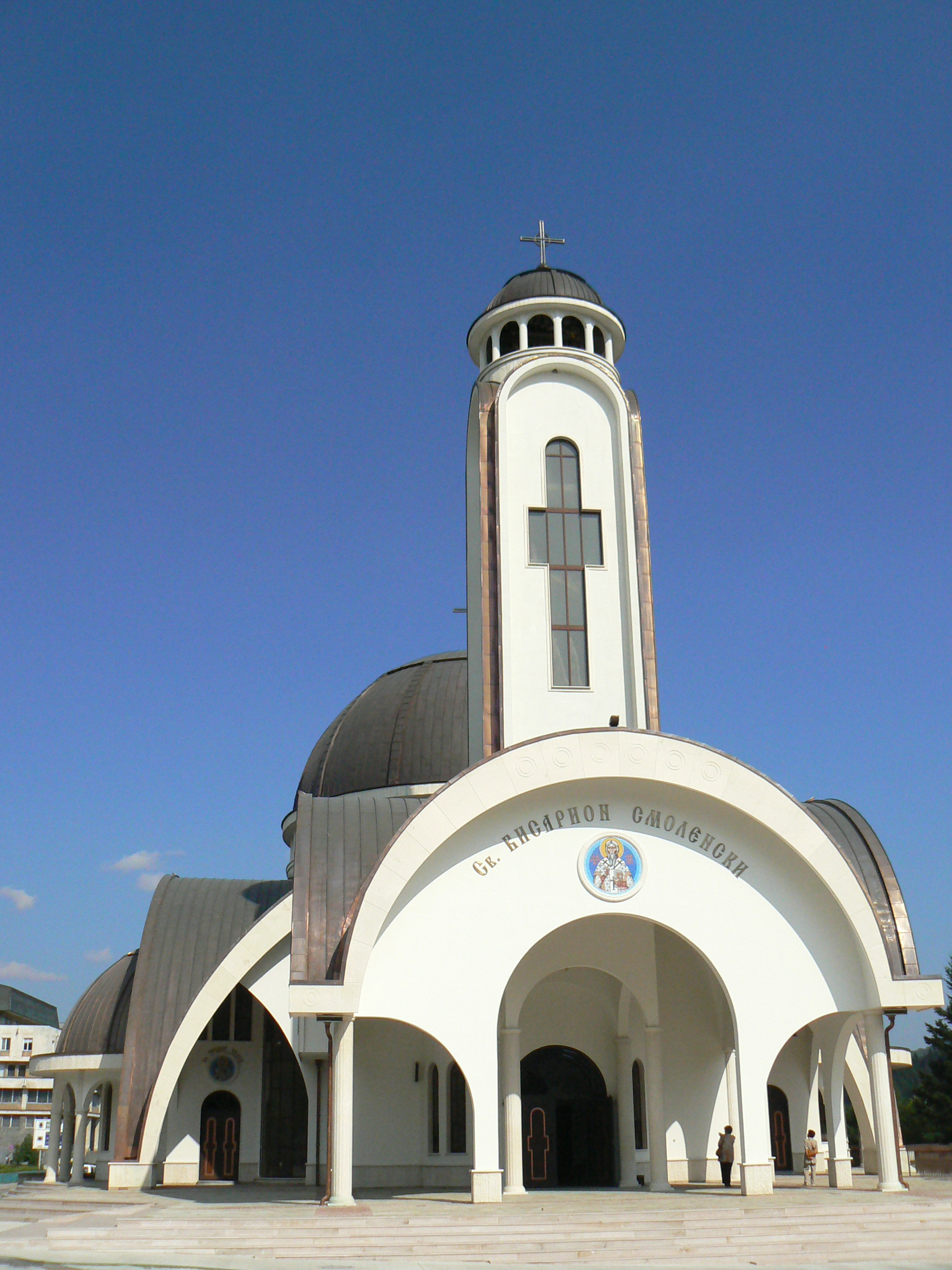
Smolyan's massive Cathedral of Saint Vissarion (2006)

== Population ==
The population of Smolyan just after World War II was about 5,000. Since then, it started growing decade by decade, mostly because of the migrants from the rural areas and the surrounding smaller towns, reaching its peak in the beginning of the 1990s, exceeding 34,000.

Smolyan
Year	1887	1910	1934	1946	1956	1965	1975	1985	1992	2001	2005	2009	2011	2021
Population	no data	no data	no data	5,406	7,472	17,448	28,492	31,539	34,086	33,153	31,988	31,718	30,642	26,167
	Highest number 34,086 in 1992													
Sources: National Statistical Institute,?? citypopulation.de,?? pop-stat.mashke.org,?? Bulgarian Academy of Sciences??

=== Ethnic linguistic and religious composition ===
According to the latest 2011 census data, the individuals who declared their ethnic identity were distributed as follows:

- Bulgarians: 25,045 (97.0%)
- Roma: 258 (1.0%)
- Turks: 153 (0.6%)
- Others: 120 (0.5%)
- Indefinable: 248 (1.0%)
  - Undeclared: 4,818 (15.7%)

Total: 30,642

In Smolyan Municipality 32,708 declared as Bulgarians, 301 as Roma and 170 as Turks, and 9,000 did not declare their ethnic group.

== Culture and sports ==
Due to its suitable location on top of Mount Rozhen, the Bulgarian National Astronomical Observatory is located nearby, with a planetarium in operation in the town. There is one theatre, the Rhodope Drama Theatre, and a gathering of theatre practitioners and scholars known as The Rhodopi International Theatre Laboratory is held every summer. There is also a regional historical museum founded in 1935.

Smolyan has an elite division football team, PFC Rodopa Smolyan, that had been playing in the A Professional Football Group between 2003-2007.

The largest church in southern Bulgaria, the Cathedral of Saint Vissarion of Smolyan, was inaugurated in the city in July 2006.

== Municipality ==
Smolyan is also the seat of Smolyan municipality (part of Smolyan Province), which includes the following 79 villages:

- Aligovska
- Arda
- Belev dol
- Bilyanska
- Borikovo
- Bostina
- Bukata
- Bukatsite
- Chamla
- Chepleten
- Chereshkite
- Chereshovo
- Chereshovska Reka
- Chokmanovo
- Chuchur
- Dimovo
- Dunevo
- Elenska
- Elyovo
- Fatovo
- Gabritsa
- Gela
- Gozdevitsa
- Gorna Arda
- Gorovo
- Gradat
- Gudevitsa
- Hasovitsa
- Isyovtsi
- Katranitsa
- Kiselichevo
- Kokorkovo
- Koshnitsa
- Kremene
- Kukuvitsa
- Kutela
- Laka
- Levochevo
- Lipets
- Lyulka
- Milkovo
- Mogilitsa
- Momchilovtsi
- Mugla
- Nadartsi
- Oreshitsa
- Ostri Pazlak
- Petkovo
- Peshtera
- Pisanitsa
- Podvis
- Polkovnik Serafimovo
- Poprelka
- Potoka
- Rechani
- Reka
- Rovina
- Selishte
- Shiroka Laka
- Sivino
- Slaveyno
- Smilyan
- Sokolovtsi
- Solishta
- Sredok
- Stikal
- Stoykite
- Sarnino
- Strazha
- Taran
- Tikale
- Trebishte
- Turyan
- Uhlovitsa
- Valchan
- Varbovo
- Vievo
- Vlahovo
- Zaevite
- Zmievo

== Geography ==
=== Climate ===
Smolyan has a dry-warm-summer humid continental climate (Köppen climate classification: Dsb), featuring warm, dry summers and cold, snowy winters.

Climate data for Smolyan
Month	Jan	Feb	Mar	Apr	May	Jun	Jul	Aug	Sep	Oct	Nov	Dec	Year
Mean daily maximum °C (°F)	2.7 (36.9)	4.5 (40.1)	9.2 (48.6)	13.6 (56.5)	18.5 (65.3)	22.2 (72.0)	25.6 (78.1)	25.7 (78.3)	21.1 (70.0)	16.3 (61.3)	10.2 (50.4)	4.1 (39.4)	14.6 (58.3)
Mean daily minimum °C (°F)	−5.2 (22.6)	−3.4 (25.9)	−2.1 (28.2)	3.9 (39.0)	7.7 (45.9)	10.8 (51.4)	12.8 (55.0)	12.7 (54.9)	8.8 (47.8)	4.7 (40.5)	1.1 (34.0)	−3.8 (25.2)	4.0 (39.2)
Average precipitation mm (inches)	80 (3.1)	70 (2.8)	90 (3.5)	90 (3.5)	200 (7.9)	100 (3.9)	80 (3.1)	30 (1.2)	10 (0.4)	90 (3.5)	180 (7.1)	210 (8.3)	1,290 (50.8)
Average relative humidity (%)	72	74	69	70	70	69	66	57	62	74	72	77	69

== Honour ==
Smolyan Point on Livingston Island in the South Shetland Islands, Antarctica is named after Smolyan.

== Notable people ==
- Valya Balkanska
- Victor Houteff, founder of the Davidian branch, an offshoot of the Seventh-day Adventist Church.
- Velichko Cholakov
- Daniil of Bulgaria
- Raicho Vasilev

== Gallery ==
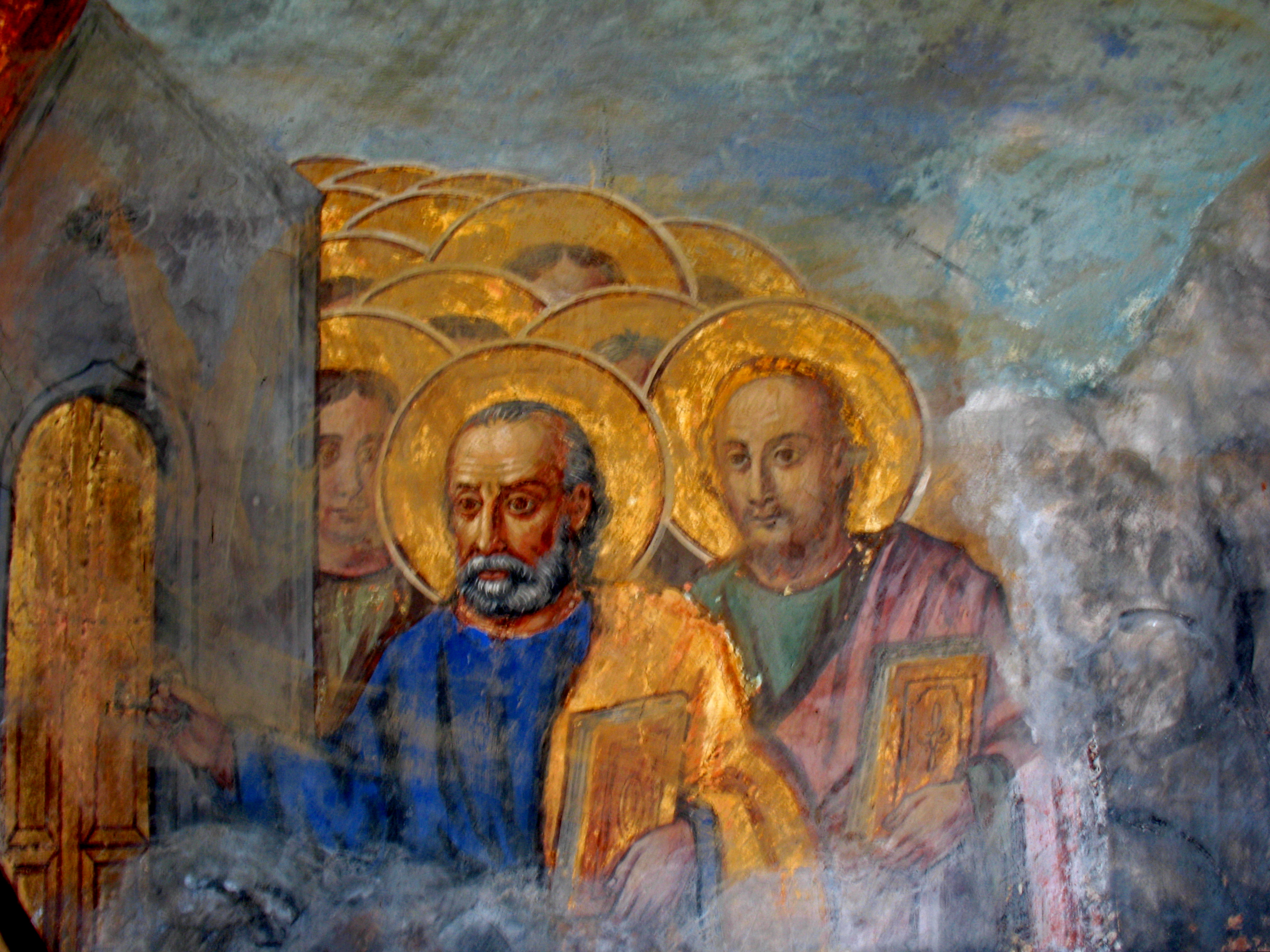

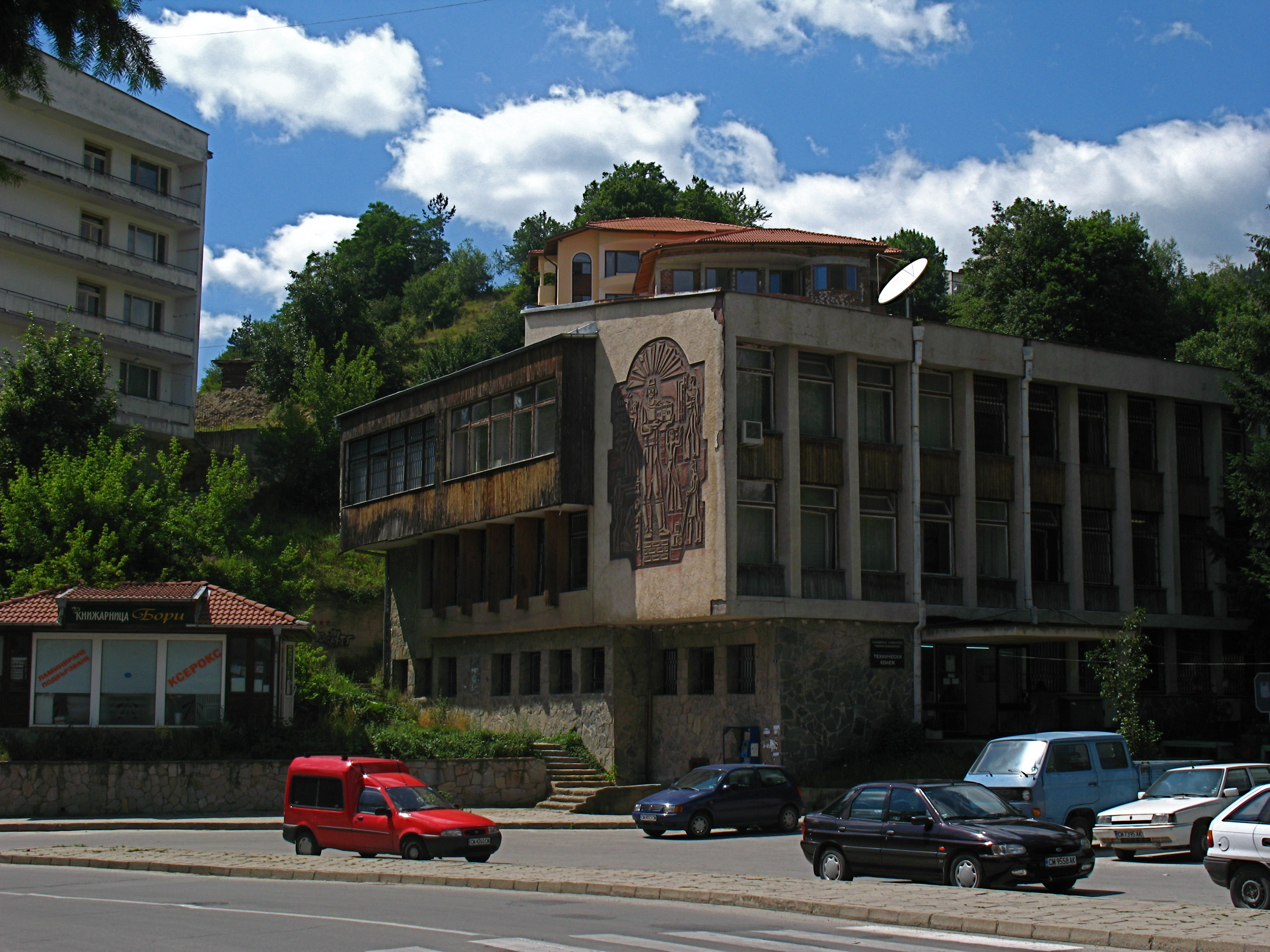

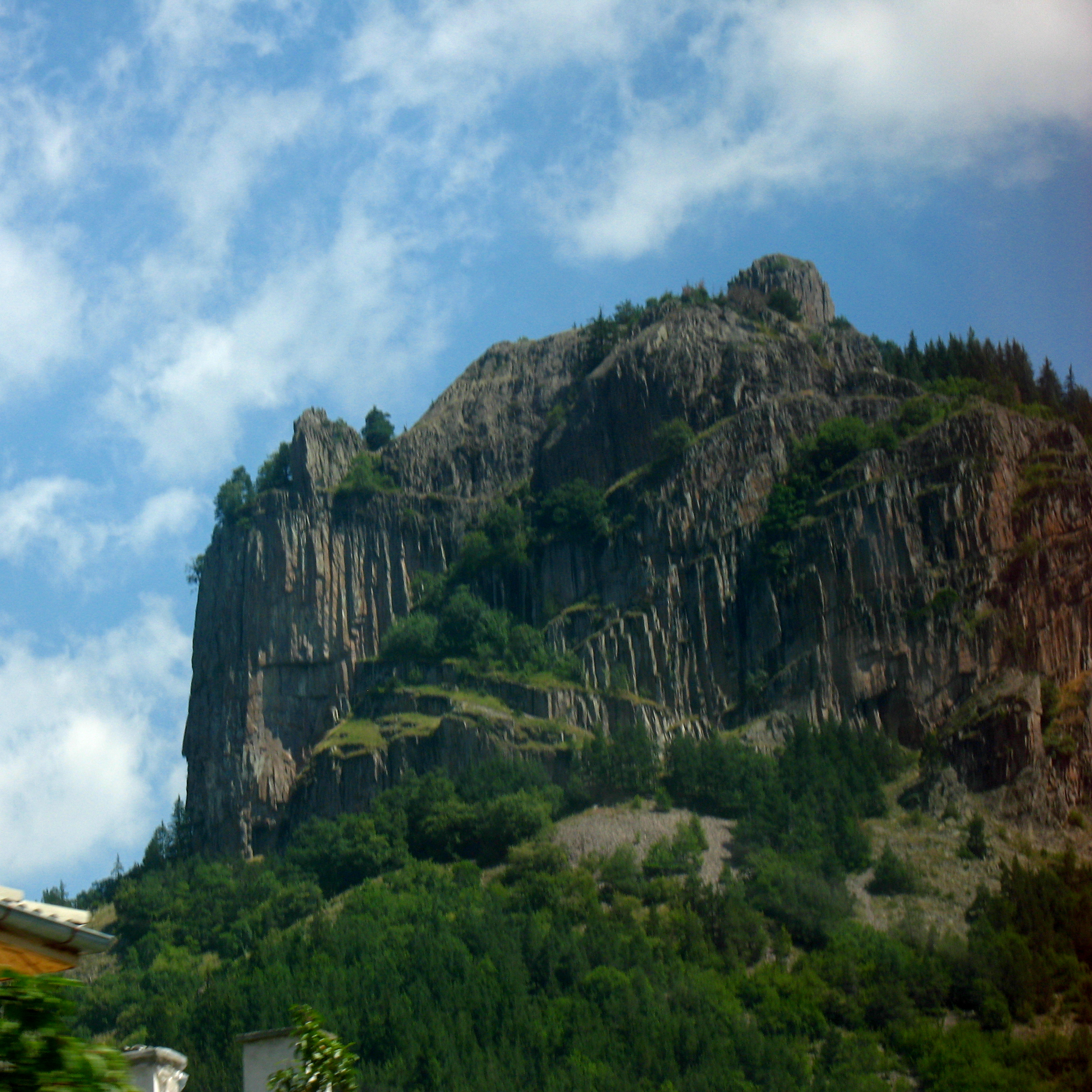

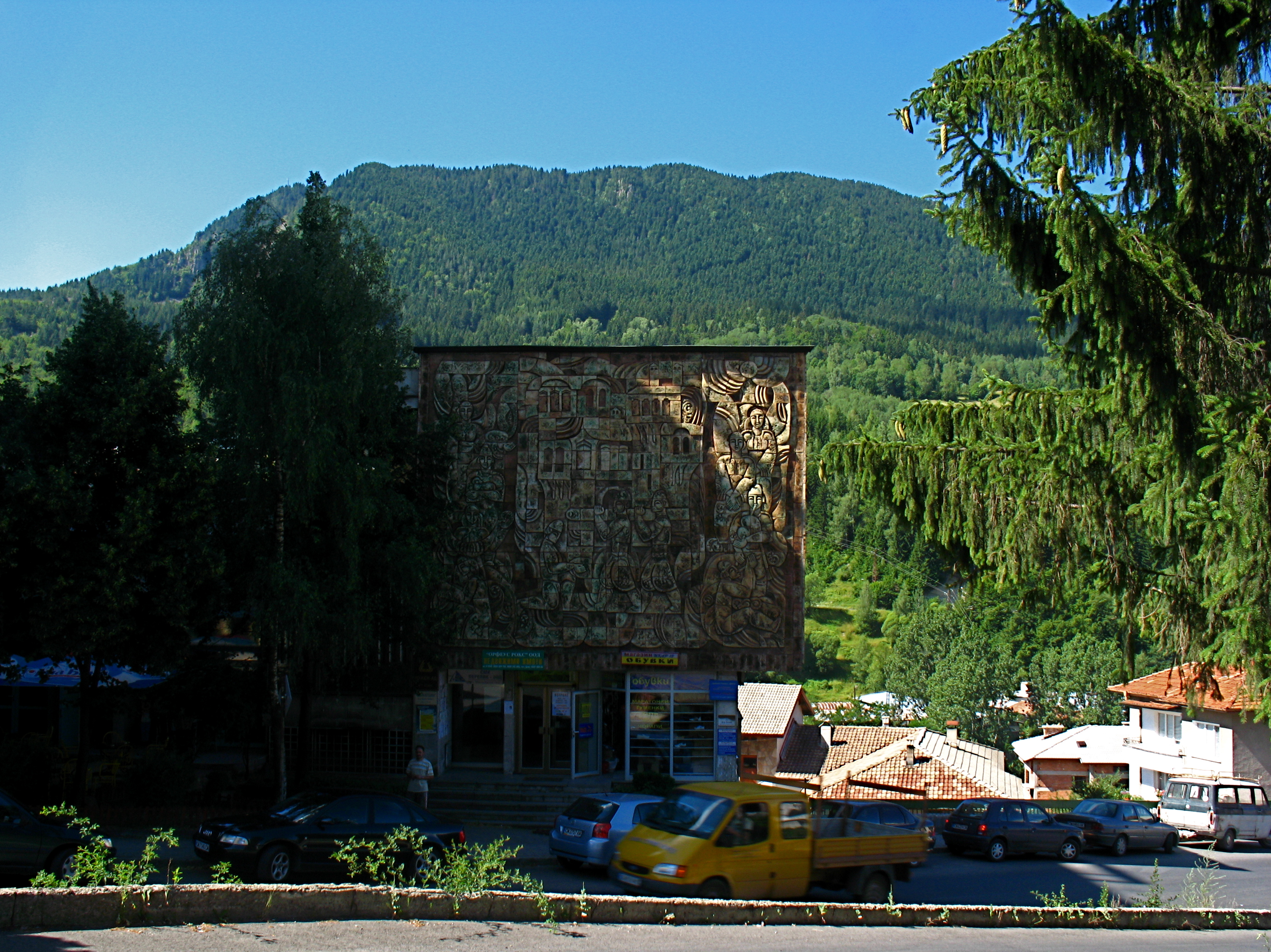

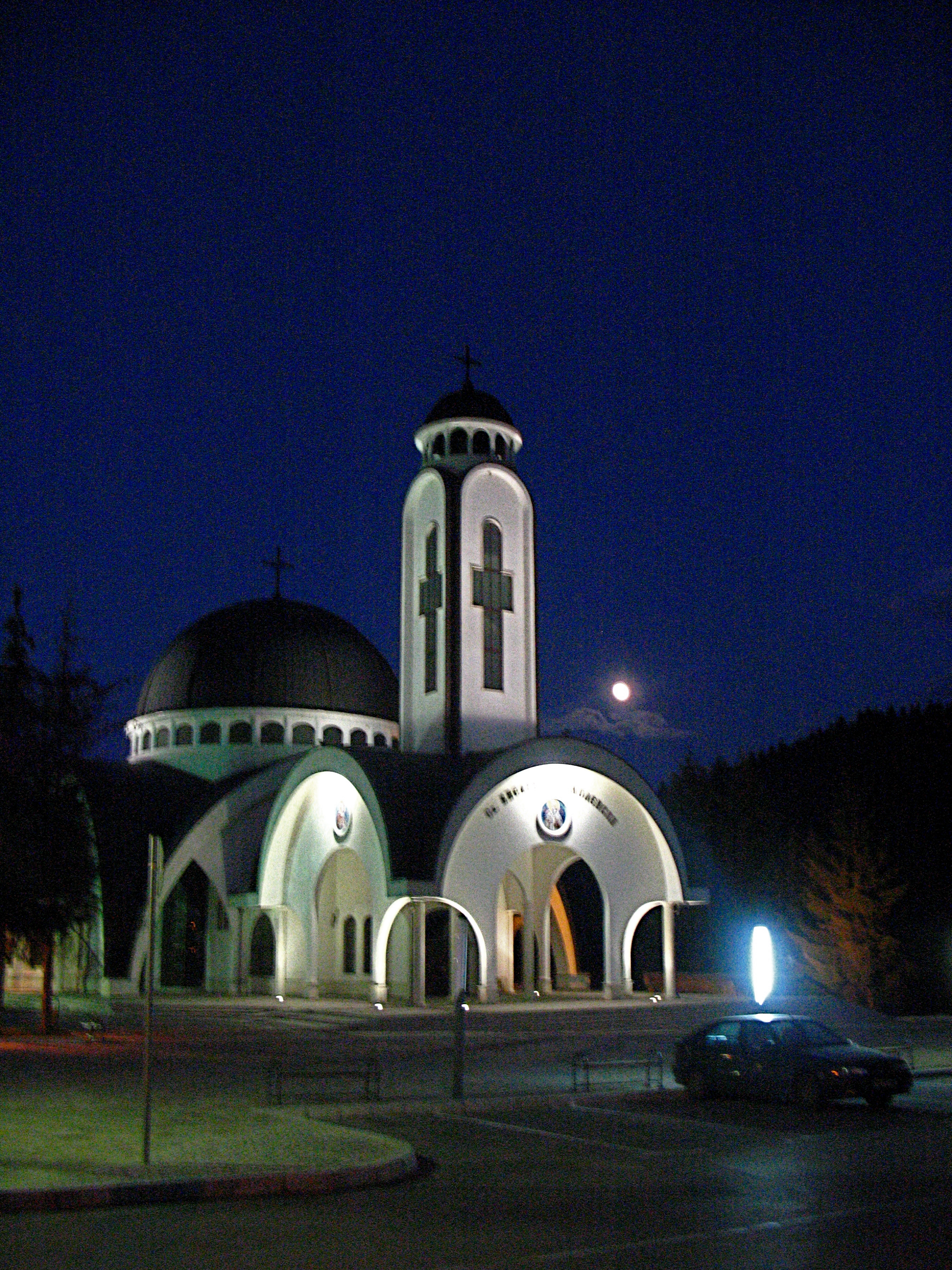

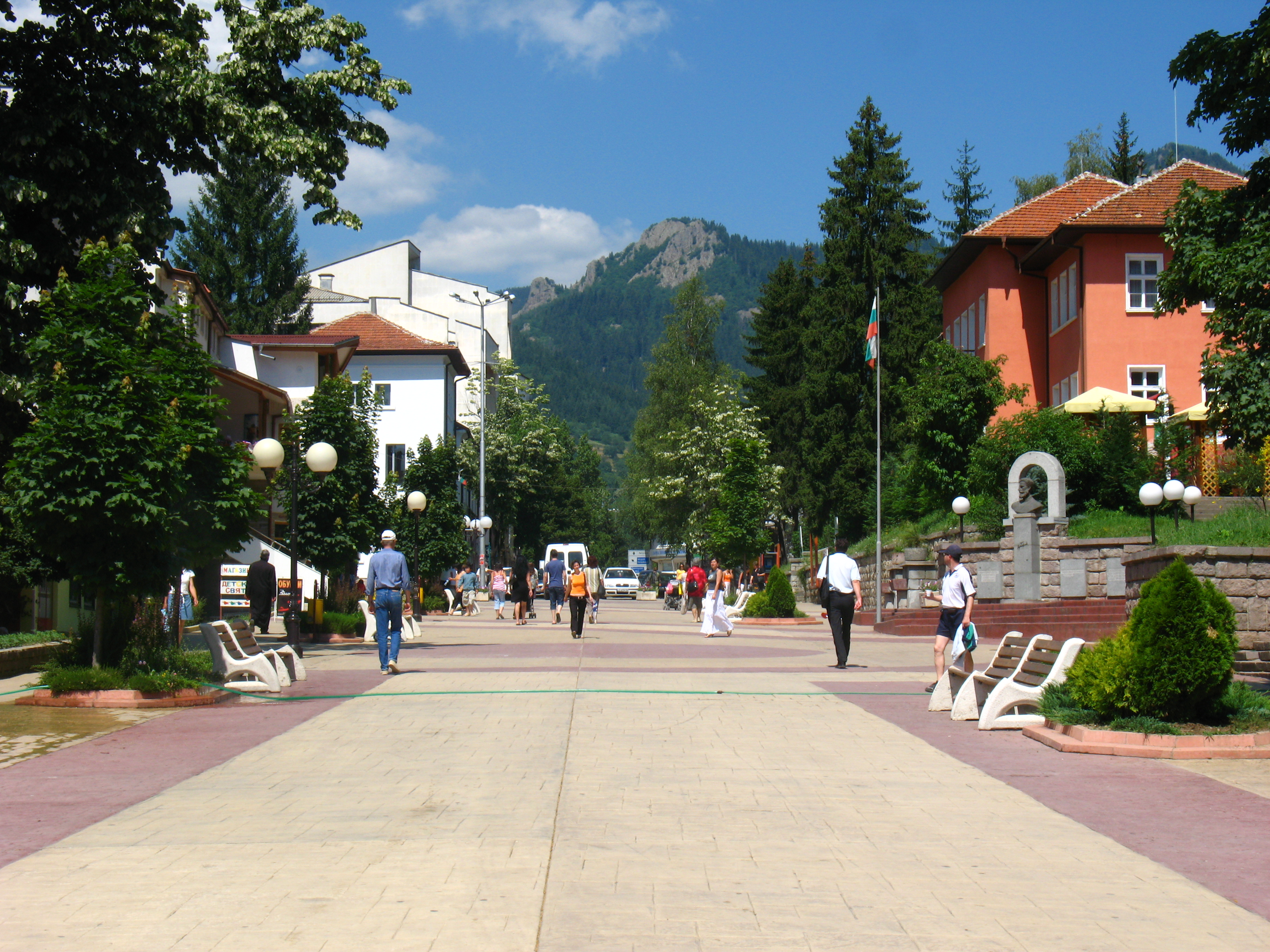

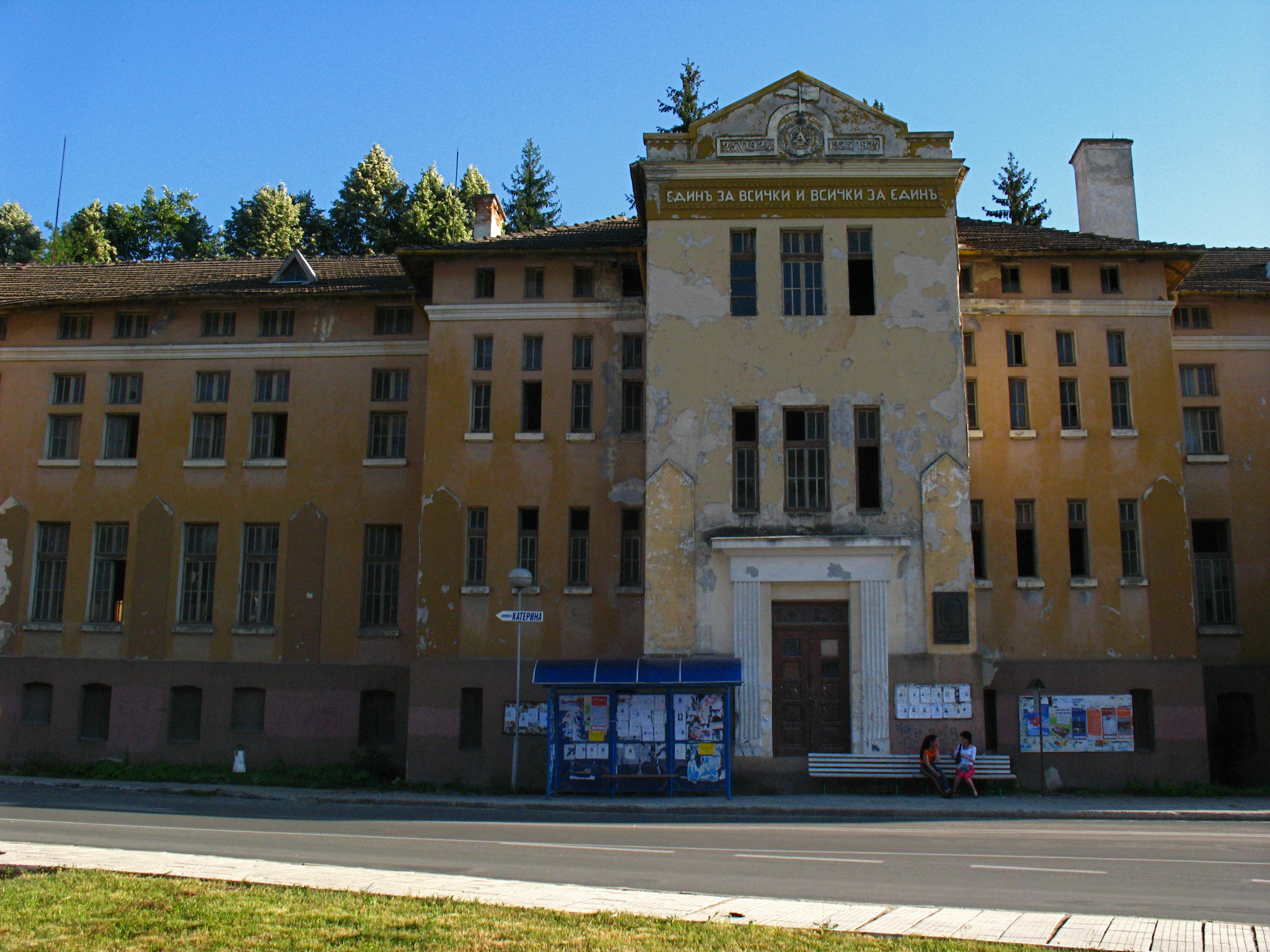

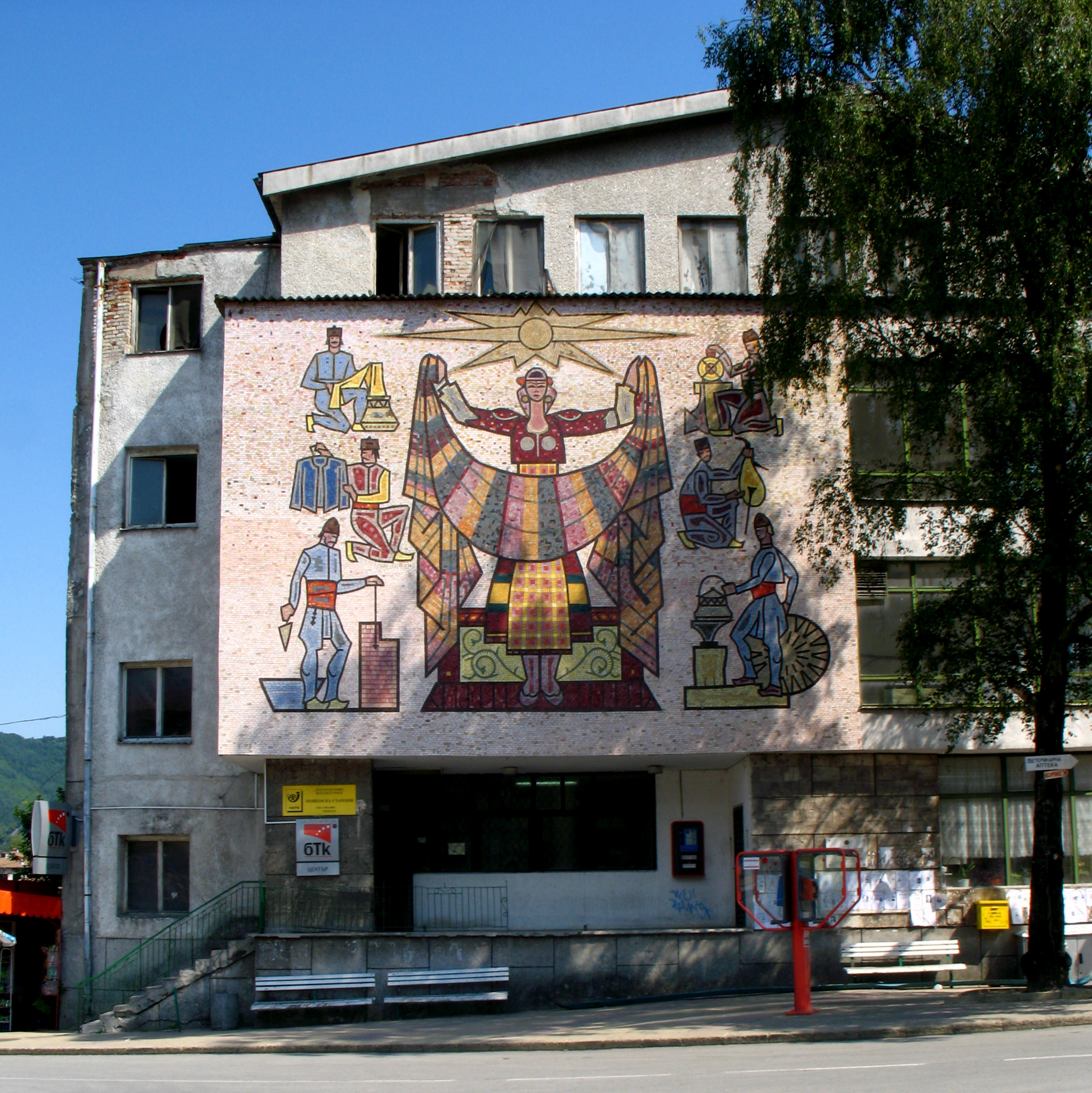

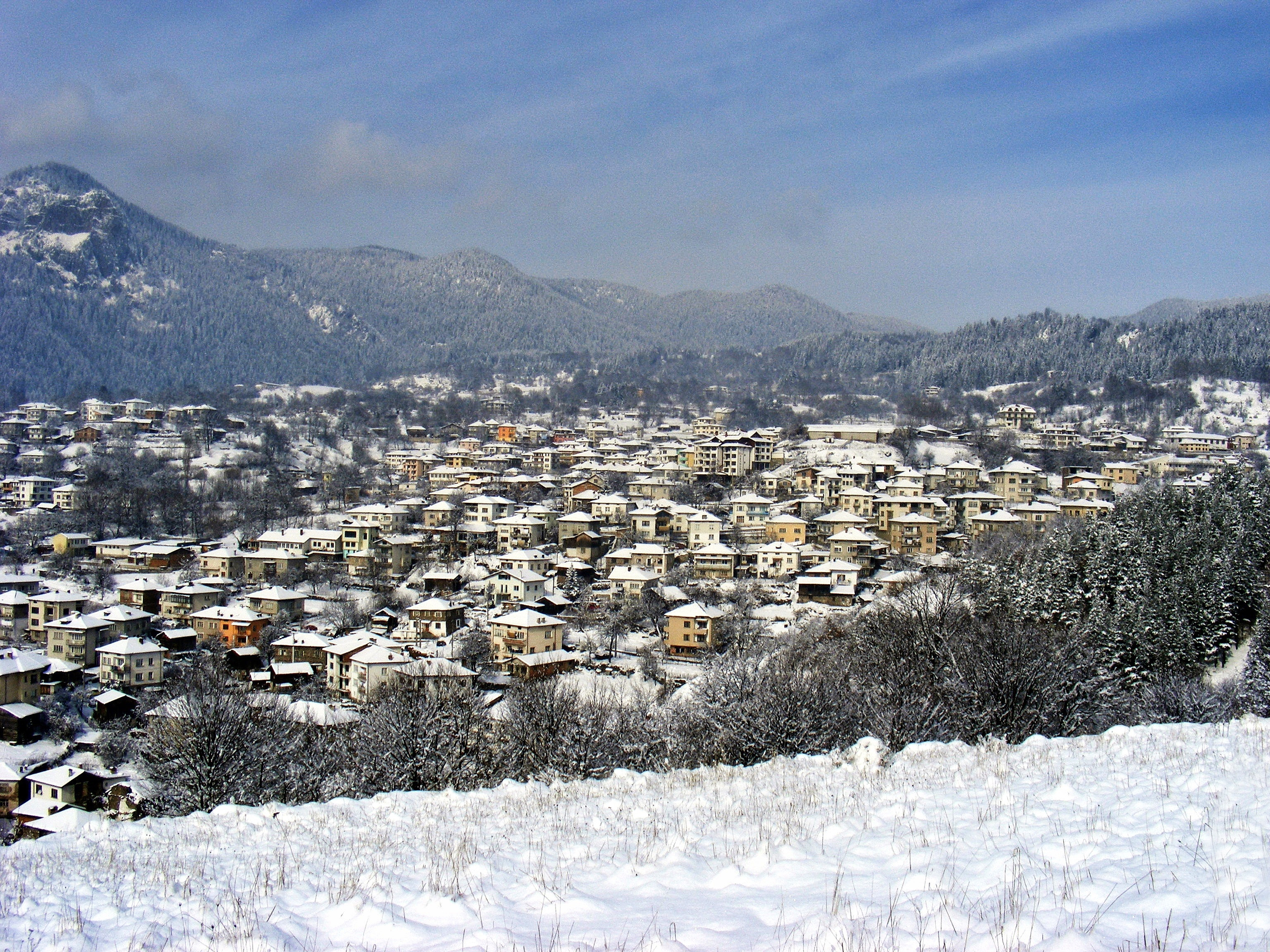

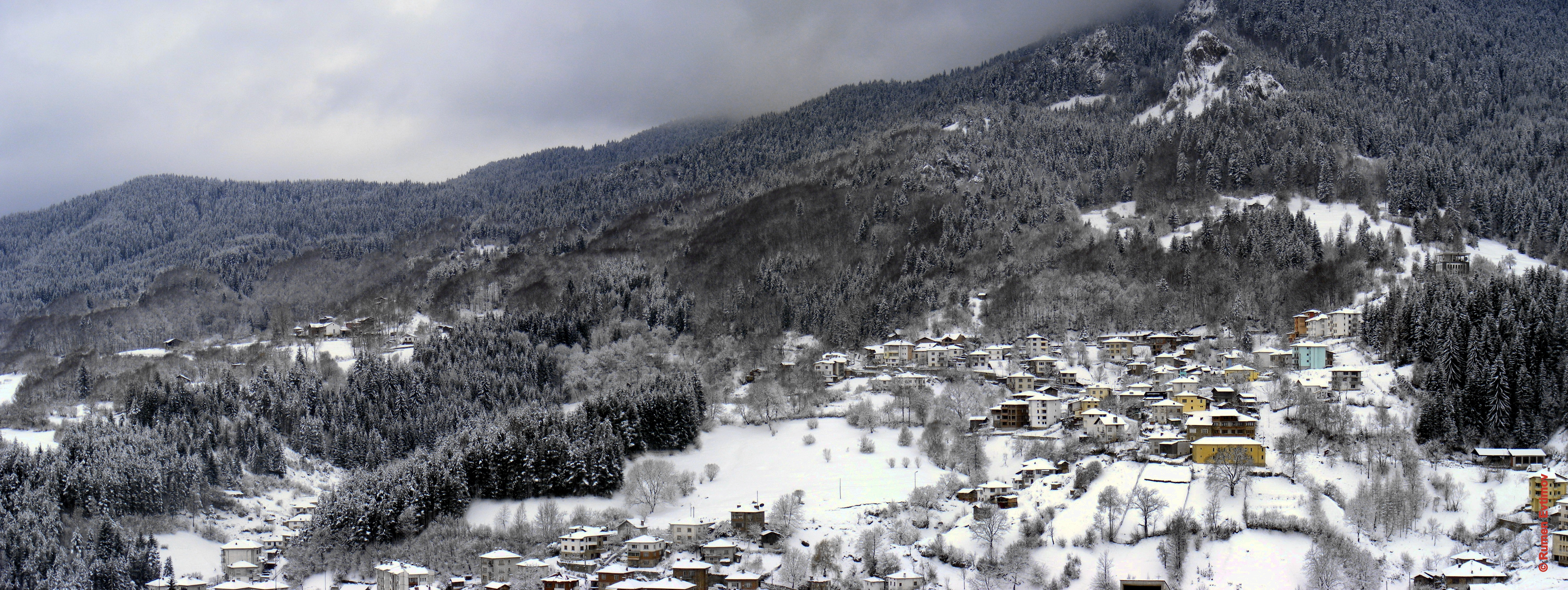

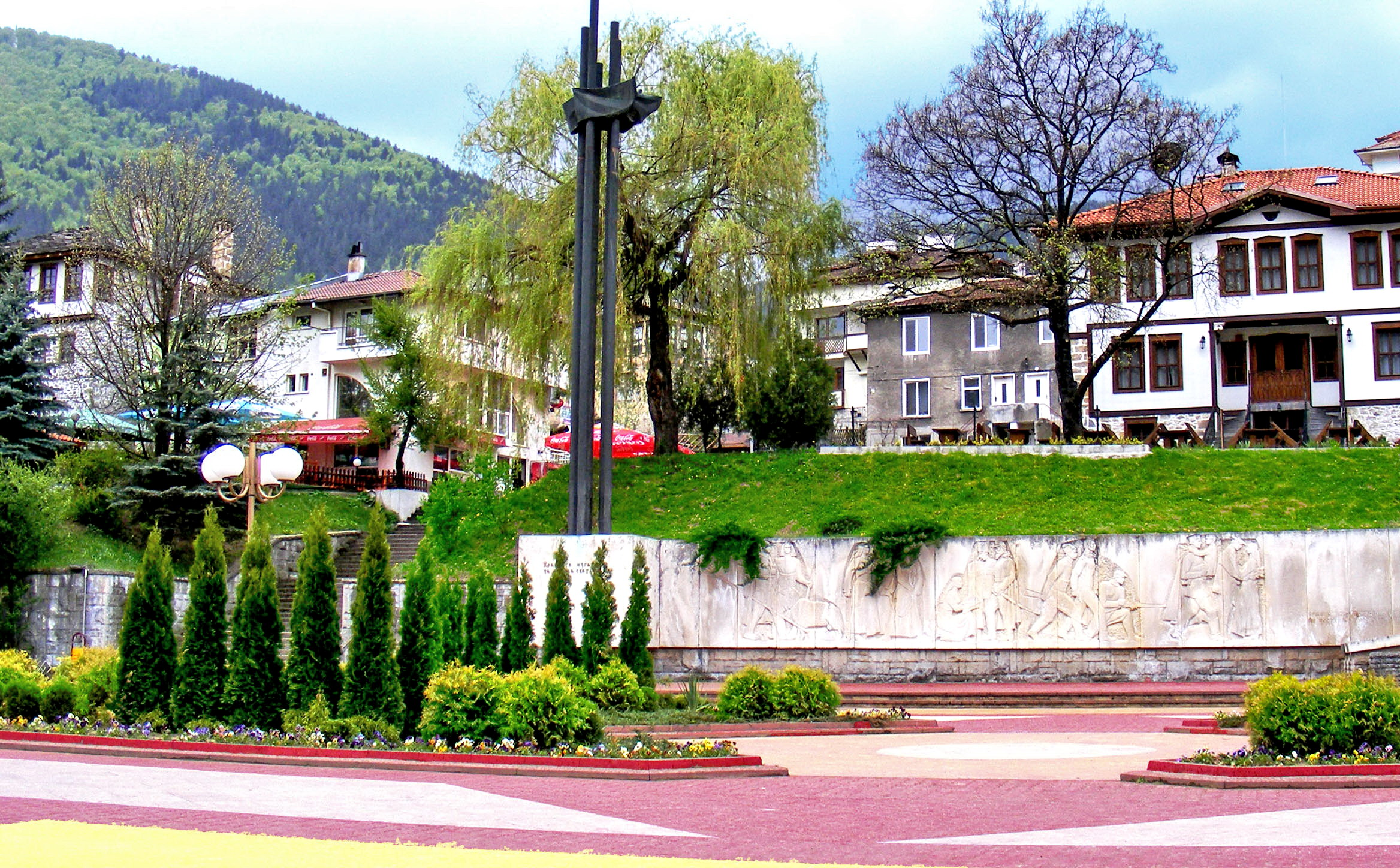

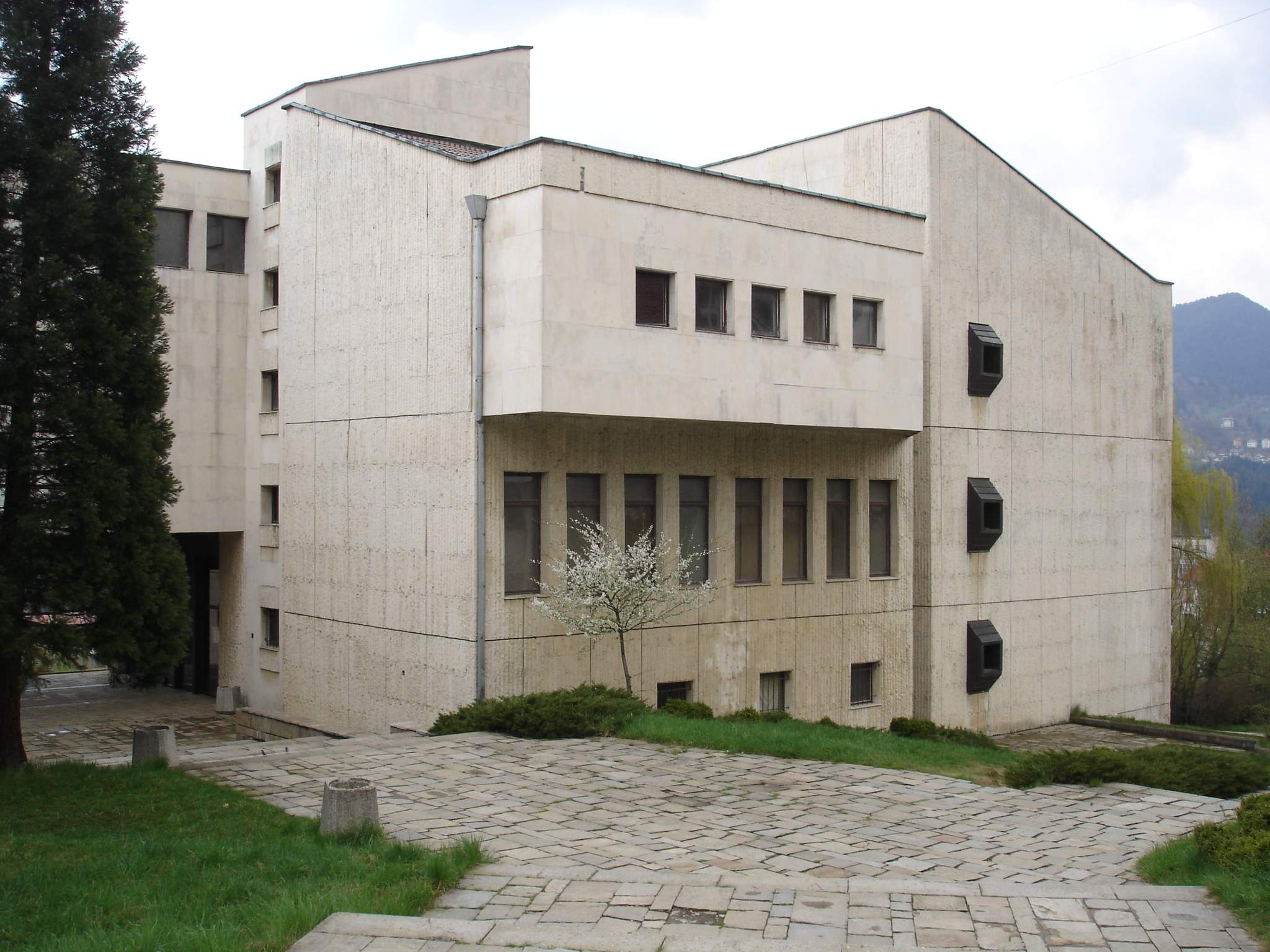
