= Bukata, Bulgaria =

Bukata
- Location in Bulgaria
- Coordinates: 41°30′N 24°29′E
- Country: Bulgaria
- Province: Smolyan Province
- Municipality: Smolyan

Population (2007)
  - Total: 82
- Time zone: UTC+2 (EET)

Bukata (Bulgarian: Буката) is a village in the municipality of Smolyan, located in the Smolyan Province of southern Bulgaria. The village covers an area of 7.63 km^{2} and is located 171.46 km from Sofia. As of 2007, the village had a population of 82 people.
