= Chokmanovo =

Village in Bulgaria

Coordinates: 41°32′N 24°44′E

Chokmanovo (Bulgarian: Чокманово) is a village in the municipality of Smolyan, in the Arda valley of the Rhodopi Mountain range. It is 11 km south of the town of Smolyan and 30 km from the ski resort of Pamporovo. The region is very sunny, and the village is near the top of a southern slope so it receives direct sun more than 300 days a year. It has 4 seasons, is snowy in winter, and is subject to spectacular thunderstorms in the late afternoons of summer.

In antiquity, the Greeks regarded this as a fierce, uninhabitable area of rough terrain and intolerable weather. The Ottomans seemed to agree, Chokmanovo translates as "the untamable people". The herdsmen in the 20th century practiced an ancient pattern of pasturing. Large family associations moved their herds south to winter in the valleys near the Mediterranean and split into smaller herds to exploit summer pastures in the valleys of the Rhodopes. Chokmanovo was a summer area, and some of the oldest residents still remember walking their donkeys to markets in Xanthi. Because it was on a main thoroughfare, the village was wealthy and the old stone houses were very well built.

When the Greek/Bulgaria border was created, the pattern was broken, and Chokmanovo became a time capsule. It is a smaller town now than before but has a strong local ethic emphasizing education, and has generated many renowned artists, writers, professors, and judges.

There are an inordinate number of retired architects here. The original architects of the village created interesting, well-sited houses, which have been well preserved. Some still have sighting holes so residents can shoot at anyone at their front doors. Currently, there are 180 full-time residents, but that number swells at school holidays when children flood into their grandparent's homes. There is also an almost unique day of return in the village, where every home has a family reunion at the same time and the whole village throws a party. Every home is full, couches and spare rooms are all booked, as all the children return and strike up old friendships.

There is a mushroom drying "factory" in the village, the orphanage is closed now, and the facilities will most likely end up as a tourist house. The village is only 8 km from Smolyan, but has much nicer weather. Another 4 km south is the large village of Smilyan, which has a dairy making the most varieties of cheese in the country. There is an ostrich farm and a paintball range in Chokmanovo.

The big news locally is the opening of the road south to Greece, restoring passages that have been closed for 50 years.
