= Shiroka Laka =

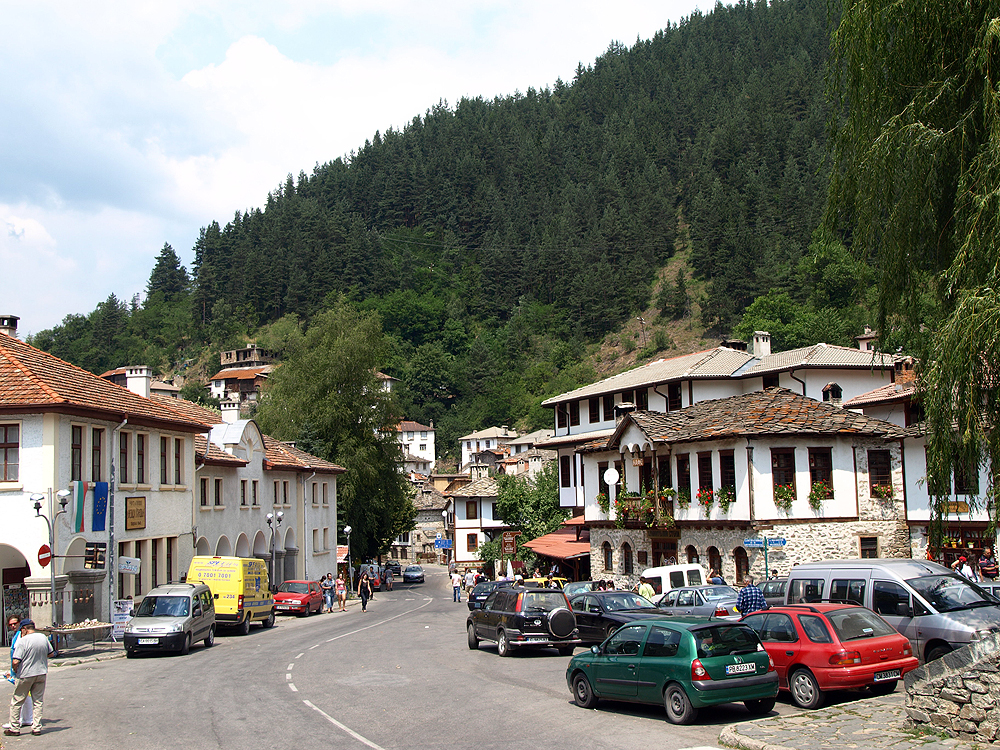
Shiroka Laka

Shiroka Laka (Bulgarian: Широка лъка [ʃiˈrɔkɐ ˈɫɤkɐ]) is a village in the very south of Bulgaria, located in Smolyan municipality, Smolyan Province. It is a proclaimed architectural and folklore reserve and lies in the central Rhodope Mountains, 23 km (14 mi) northwest of Smolyan, 16 km (10 mi) west of Pamporovo, and 22 km (14 mi) southeast of Devin.

The dominant and traditional religion in the village is Eastern Orthodox Christianity and the population is 573 (as of September 2005). Shiroka Laka lies at 1,206 m (3,957 ft) above sea level, at 41°41′N 24°35′E.

== Architecture ==
Shiroka Laka is famous for its authentic Rhodopean houses set in tiers on both banks of the local river. The old houses were designed in the characteristic architectural style of the Rhodopes by the noted local building masters, and feature two storeys, oriels, built-in cupboards and a small cellar with a hiding place. The thick white walls hide the yard from the outsiders' eyes. The yard is small and slab-covered and has a typical stone drinking fountain in the middle. Some of the most famous houses are those of the Zgurov, Uchikov, and Grigorov families.

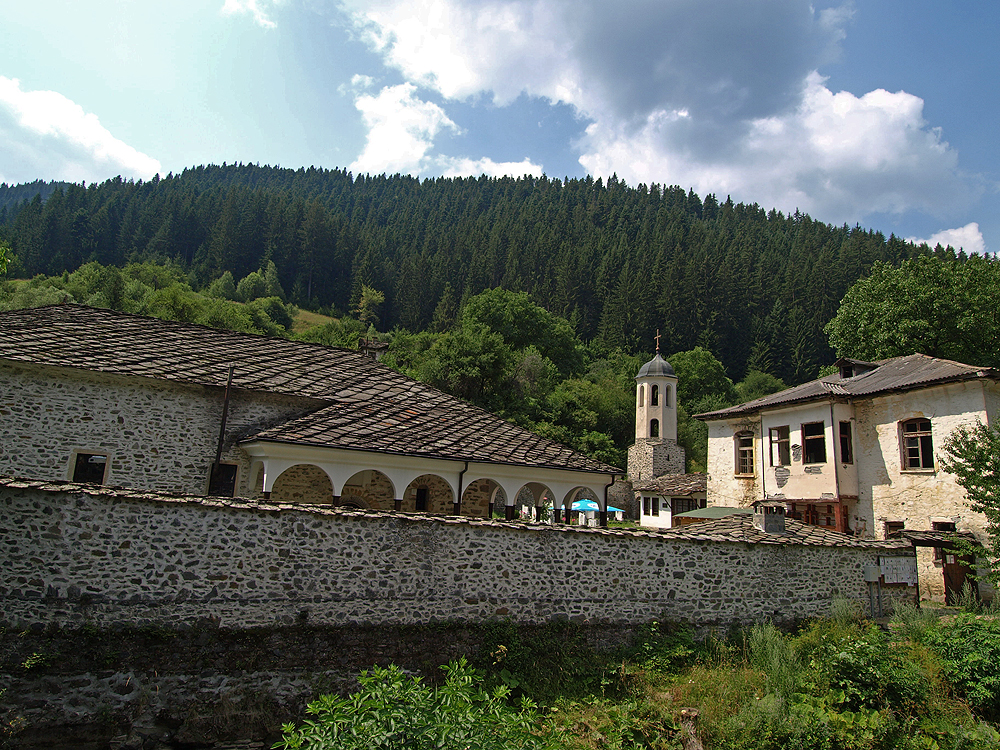
19th century St. Theotokos (Holy Mother) Church and St. Panteleimonas School

The local Church of the Holy Mother of God was constructed in 1834 for 38 days according to the legend. It boasts an authentic iconostasis, possibly painted by apprentices of the brothers Dimitar and Zahari Zograf from Samokov, or even by the brothers themselves. The old school, built in 1835, is located near the church. There is one more church in the village, the Church of St Nicholas.

== Culture ==
Shiroka Laka is known not only for its old Bulgarian architecture, but also for its singing tradition and the kaba gaida, a local type of bagpipe. Some of the most prominent singers of Rodopi music come from the village, including the Kushlevi Sisters, and many of the local families are well familiar with the style. A secondary school for folklore songs and instruments was founded in 1972. Among its graduates are Neli Andreeva, soloist and singer with the Philip Kutev Folklore Ensemble, and composer Georgi Andreev.

On the first Sunday of March, the village also hosts one of the best known kukeri (specific Bulgarian type of carnival) celebrations in the country, Pesponedelnik as it is called. On that day, people dressed as folklore monsters, carrying wooden swords and painted red, dance around the village to drive the evil spirits out of the homes and the peoples' souls. Their costumes are decorated with bulbs of garlic, beans and peppers and they wear a belt with characteristic Rhodope bells attached to it.
