= Banite =

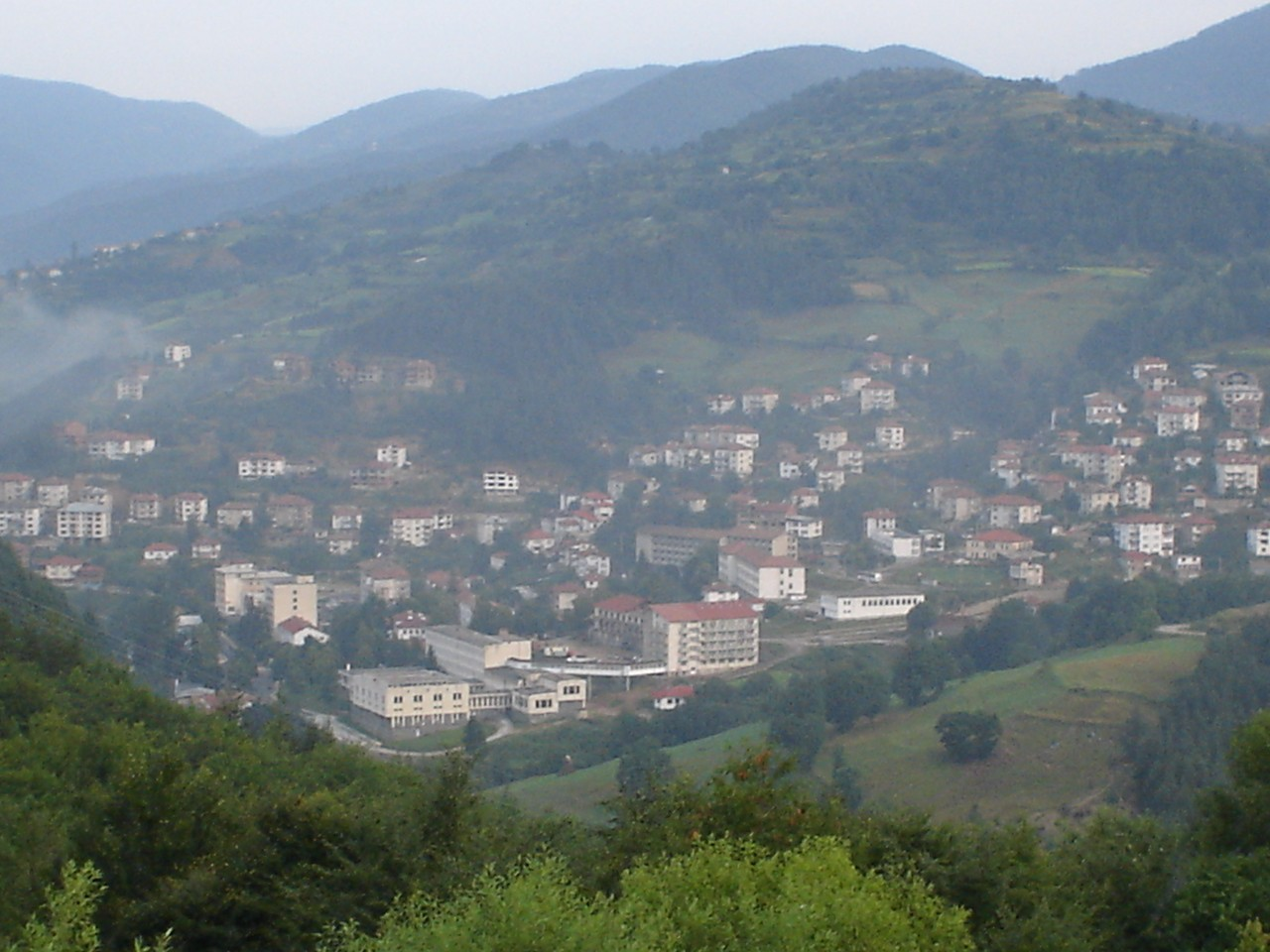
Photograph of Banite taken from the Kuchukova Hotel

Banite (Bulgarian: Баните [ˈbanitɛ]; "The Baths") is a village in the Central Rhodope Mountains of southern Bulgaria. It is the administrative centre of Banite Municipality, Smolyan Province. Banite is known for its mineral springs, hydro and balneotherapy centre. It is situated about 270km south-east from the capital Sofia and 40km east from the famous ski resort Pamporovo.

The village lies at 41°37′N 25°1′E at 681 m above sea level. As of September 2005 it has a population of 1,500.

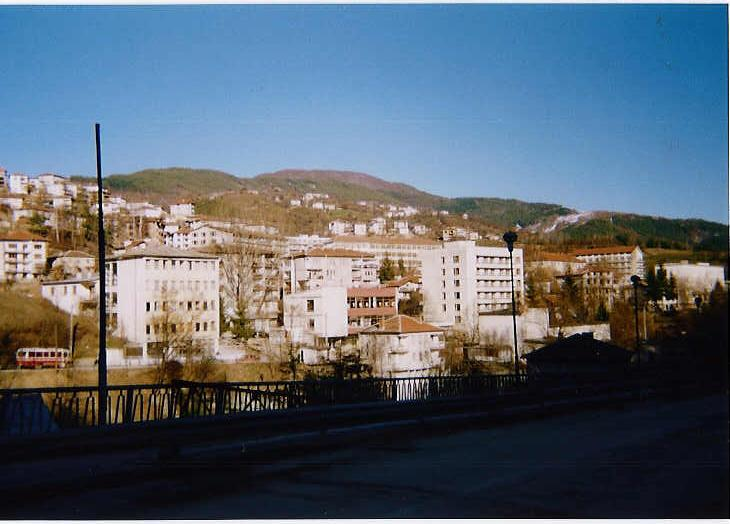
Banite from the Bridge looking Northward
