= Startsevo, Bulgaria =

Coordinates: 41°25′N 25°04′E

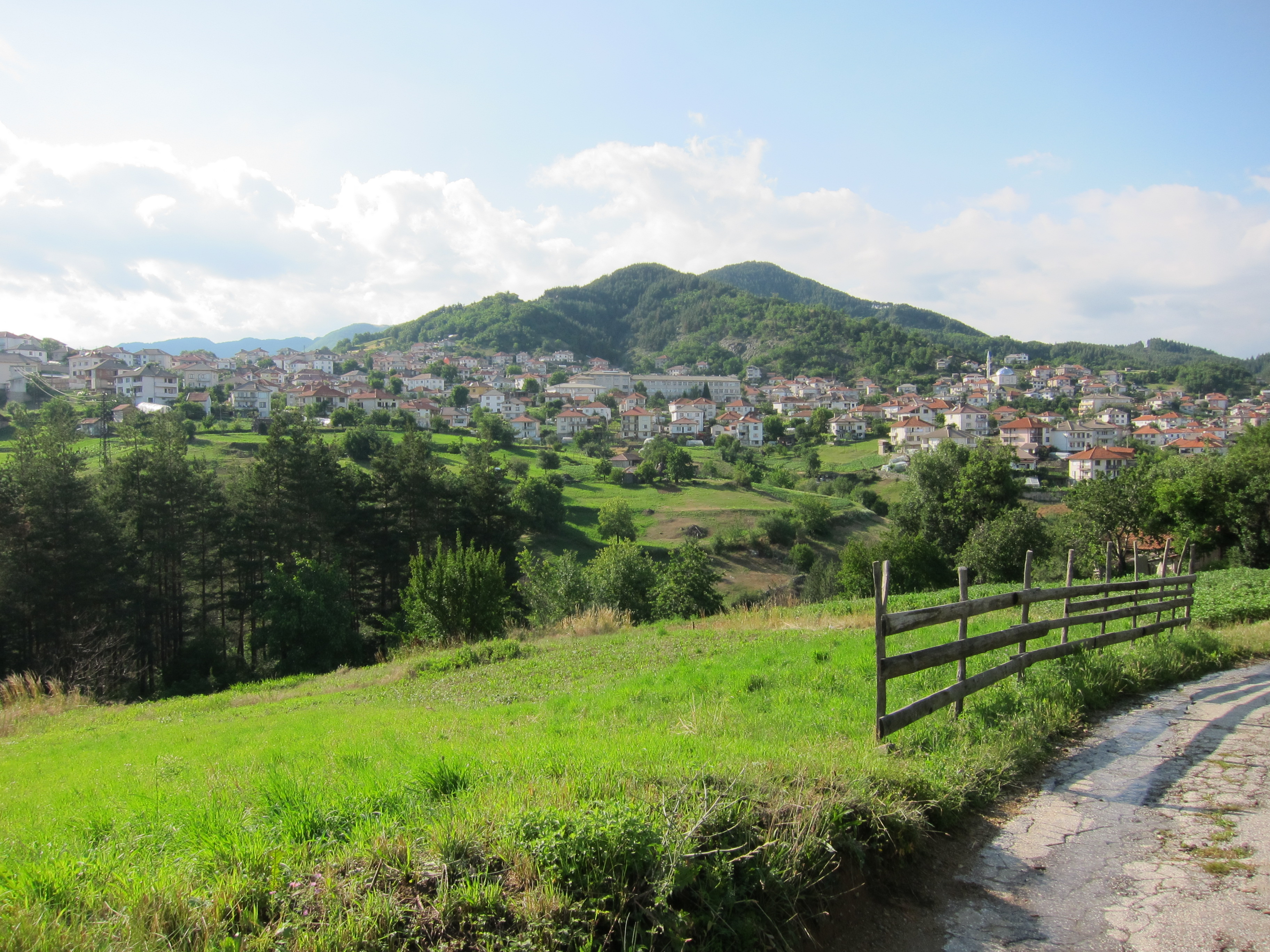
The Bulgarian village Startsevo in the Southeastern Rhodope mountains

Startsevo (Bulgarian: Старцево) is a village in the Zlatograd municipality in southern Bulgaria, located near the Greece border.

A Thracian sanctuary was excavated there in 1978. Finds from the site date to the late Bronze Age, Iron Age, and Antiquity (probably 1500 BC until it was abandoned around AD 100).
