= Smolyan Province =

Province in southern Bulgaria

Coordinates: 41°40′N 24°35′E

Smolyan Province Област Смолян
- Province
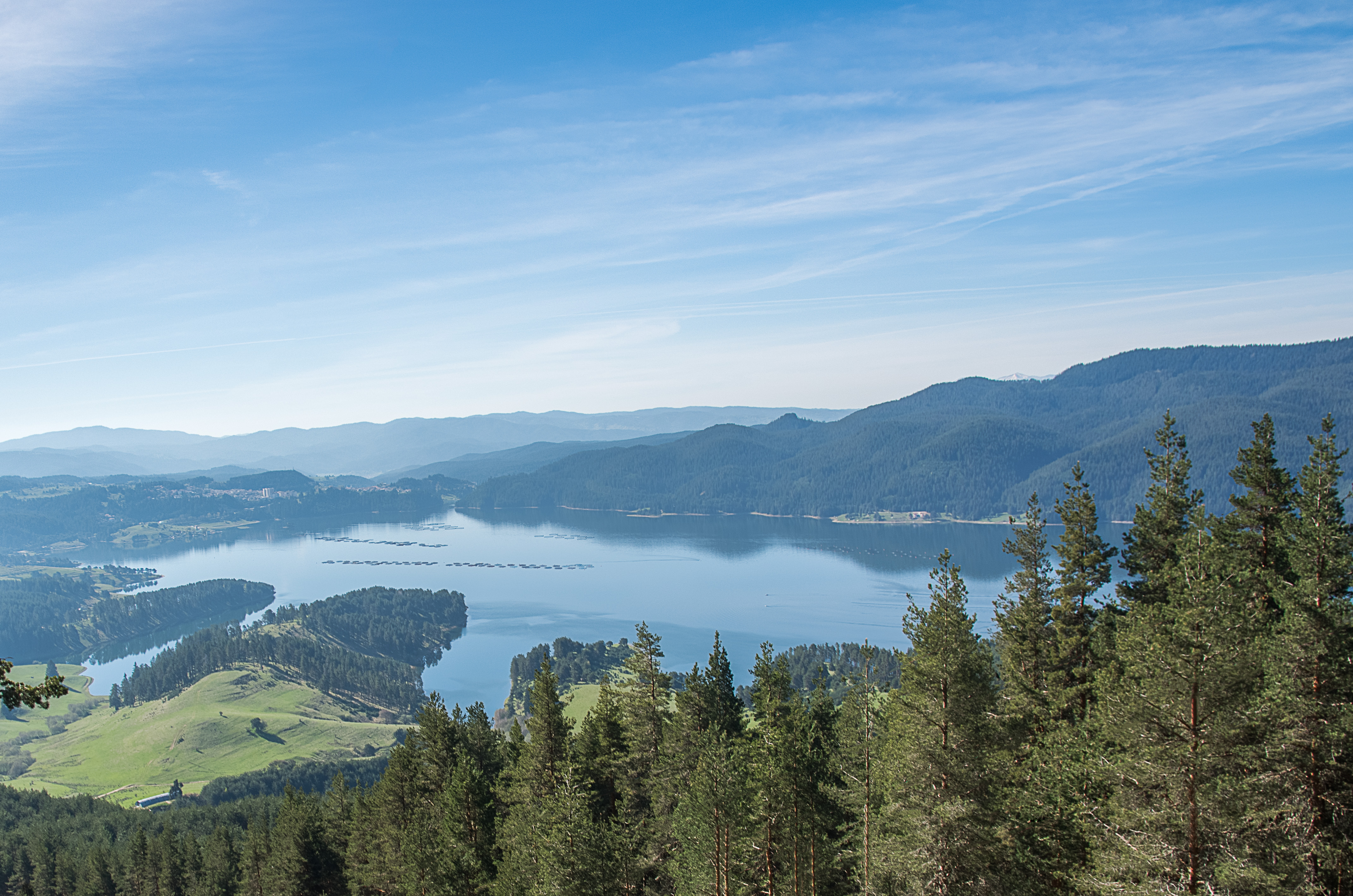
- Dospat Reservoir

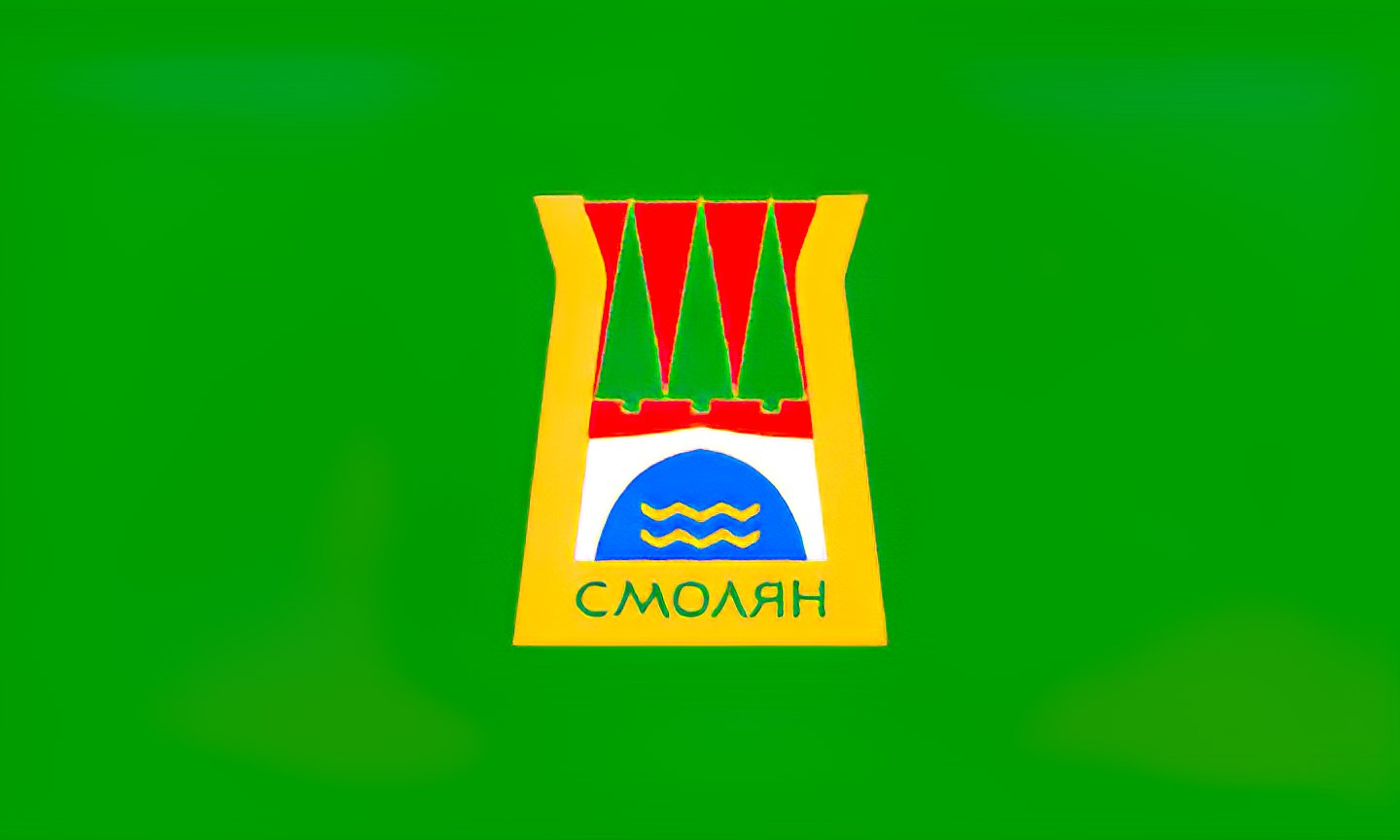
- Flag

- Location of Smolyan Province in Bulgaria
- Country: Bulgaria
- Capital: Smolyan
- Municipalities: 10

Government
  - Governor: Nedyalko Slavov

Area
  - Total: 3,192.8 km^{2} (1,232.7 sq mi)

Population (December 2023)
  - Total: 92,107
  - Density: 28.848/km^{2} (74.717/sq mi)
- Time zone: UTC+2 (EET)
  - Summer (DST): UTC+3 (EEST)
- License plate: CM
- Website: sm.government.bg

Smolyan Province (Bulgarian: Област Смолян, Oblast Smolyan; former name Smolyan okrug) is a province in Southern-central Bulgaria, located in the Rhodope Mountains, neighbouring Greece to the south. It is named after its administrative and industrial centre — the city of Smolyan. The province embraces a territory of 3,192.8 km^{2} (1,232.7 sq mi). that is divided into 10 municipalities with a total population of 124,795, as of December 2009.

== Municipalities ==
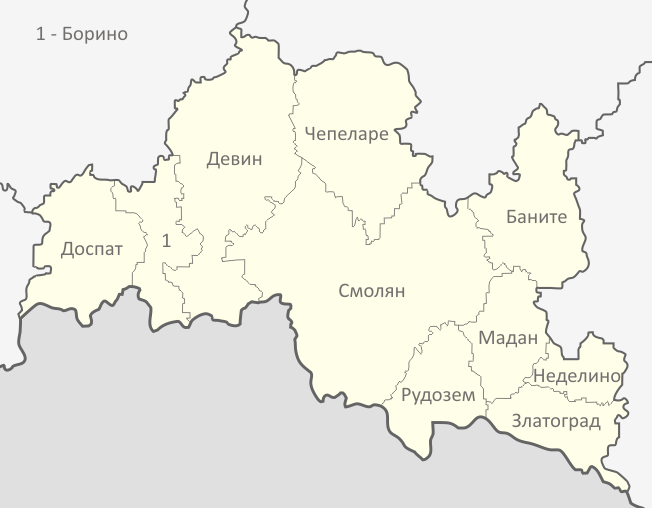
Municipalities of Smolyan province

Smolyan Province (Област, Oblast) contains 10 municipalities (singular: община, obshtina; plural: Общини, obshtini). The following table shows the names of each municipality in English and Cyrillic, the main town or village (towns are shown in bold), and the population of each as of December 2009.

Municipality	Cyrillic	Pop.	Town/Village	Pop.
Banite	Баните	4,972	Banite	1,047
Borino	Борино	3,618	Borino	2,516
Chepelare	Чепеларе	8,045	**Chepelare**	5,412
Devin	Девин	13,204	**Devin**	7,054
Dospat	Доспат	9,526	**Dospat**	2,604
Madan	Мадан	12,606	**Madan**	6,007
Nedelino	Неделино	7,577	**Nedelino**	4,641
Rudozem	Рудозем	9,801	**Rudozem**	3,583
Smolyan	Смолян	43,186	**Smolyan**	31,718
Zlatograd	Златоград	12,260	**Zlatograd**	7,110

== Demographics ==
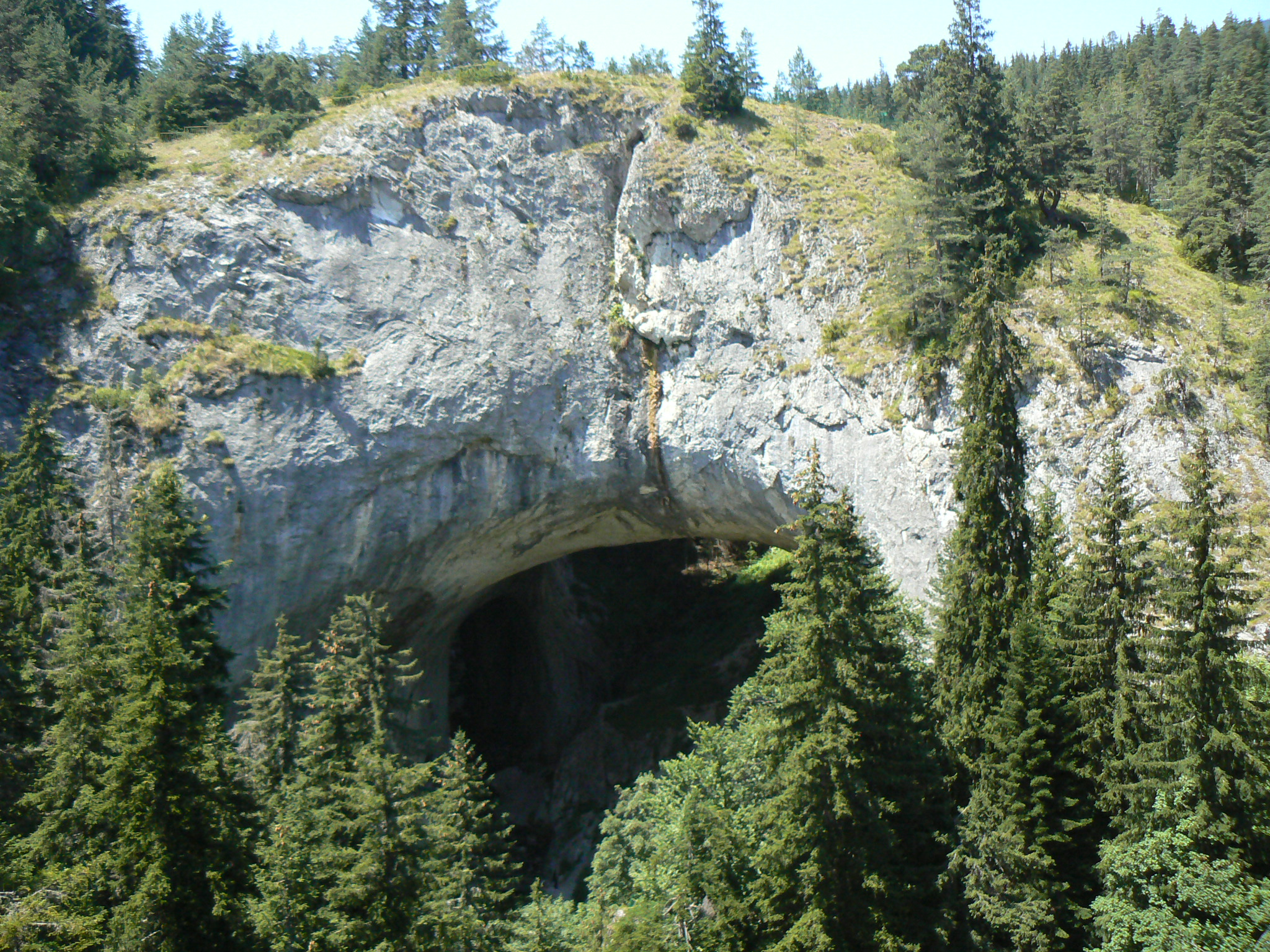
The Miraculous bridges

Historical population
Year	Pop.	±%
1946	111,193	—
1956	145,072	+30.5%
1965	160,255	+10.5%
1975	156,157	−2.6%
1985	158,011	+1.2%
1992	154,553	−2.2%
2001	140,066	−9.4%
2011	121,752	−13.1%
2021	96,284	−20.9%
Source: pop-stat.mashke.org

The Smolyan province had a population of 140,066 according to the 2001 census, of which 48.8% were male and 51.2% were female.

As of the end of 2009, the population of the province, announced by the Bulgarian National Statistical Institute, numbered 124,795 of which 23.4% are inhabitants aged over 60 years.

As of the end of 2023, the population decreased to 92,107.

=== Ethnic groups ===
Ethnic groups in Smolyan Province (2011 census)
Ethnic group	Percentage
Bulgarians	91.3%
Turks	4.9%
others and indefinable	3.8%

Total population (2011 census): 121,752
Ethnic groups (2011 census): Identified themselves: 95,175 persons:

- Bulgarians: 86,847 (91.25%)
- Turks: 4,696 (4.93%)
- Others and indefinable: 3,632 (3.82%)

A further 26,000 persons in the Province did not declare their ethnic group at the 2011 census.

In the 2001 census, 132,654 people of the population of 140,066 of Smolyan Province identified themselves as belonging to one of the following ethnic groups:

Ethnic group	Population	Percentage
Bulgarians	122,806	87.677%
Turkish	6,212	4.435%
Romani	686	0.49%
Russians	111	0.079%
Armenians	42	0.03%
Greeks	13	0.009%
Ukrainians	27	0.019%
Jewish	1	0.001%
Romanians	1	0.001%
Other	55	0.039%

=== Language ===
In the 2001 census, 135,761 people of the population of 140,066 of Smolyan Province identified one of the following as their mother tongue (with percentage of total population): 129,181 Bulgarian (92.2%), 5,782 Turkish (4.1%), 532 Romani (0.4%) and 266 other (0.2%).

=== Religion ===
Religions in Smolyan Province (2011 census)
Religious group	Percentage
No answer or Irreligious	61.4%
Muslim	19.6%
Orthodox Christian	19.1%

Unlike Kardzhali Province where the majority of the Muslim population is Turkish, the Muslim population of Smolyan Province is made up mostly of Muslim Bulgarians. The Muslim population is mainly concentrated in the municipalities Banite, Borino, Dospat, Madan and Rudozem. The Orthodox-Christians population live predominantly in the municipality of Smolyan and the municipality of Chepelare. The religious structure of the municipalities of Devin, Nedelino and Zlatograd is mixed with Pomaks as well as Orthodox Christians.

Religious adherence in the province according to 2011 census:

Census 2011
religious adherence	population	%
Answer not mentioned	75,171	50.8%
Muslims	29,001	19.6%
Orthodox Christians	28,294	19.1%
Others and declared irreligious	15,632	10.6%
**total**	**148,098**	100%

== Economy ==
The economy of the province is based on tourism, mining, timber and machine industries and livestock raising. The main crops of the region are potatoes (about 30% of the national production), rye and barley; but sheep, pigs and cattle are of greater importance for the agriculture. In the eastern parts of the province are located more than 20 lead and zinc mines, which form one of the most extensive ore deposits in the Balkans. The dense coniferous forests are prerequisite for well-developed timber industry in Dospat, Smolyan, Devin. In Smolyan there are big plants producing machine tools and other machinery, while textile industry is mainly developed to the east in Nedelino, Zlatograd, Madan and Rudozem. There is also a synthetic rubber plant in Madan.

Bulgaria's national observatory, Rozhen Observatory, is located near Chepelare. The primary of Media of Bulgaria has a 2-meter mirror, and is the largest observatory in SE Europe.

== See also ==
- Provinces of Bulgaria
- List of villages in Smolyan Province
