= List of show caves =

This is a sortable list of show caves. A show cave is a cave that has been made accessible to the public for guided visits, where a cave is defined as a natural occurring void beneath the surface of the earth, per the International Show Caves Association. For a list of all caves, see: List of caves.

Name	Country/Countries	Notes
Aggtelek Karst and Slovak Karst Caves	Hungary; Slovakia	On the Subterranean World Heritage List
Akiyoshidai Cave	Japan	Located in the Akiyoshidai Quasi-National Park, Yamaguchi Prefecture
Alabaster Caverns	United States	Located in the Alabaster Caverns State Park, Oklahoma
Alisadr Cave	Iran	The largest water cave, located in Hamedan
Angitis	Greece	Located near Prosotsani
Atta Cave	Germany	One of the largest dripstone caves in Germany, located near Attendorn
Aven d'Orgnac	France	Located near Orgnac-l'Aven
Avshalom Cave (Absalom Cave, Soreq Cave)	Israel	Located in the Judean Hills
Bacho Kiro Cave	Bulgaria	The first show cave in Bulgaria, inaugurated in 1937 and located near Dryanovo
Batu Caves	Malaysia	Located near Kuala Lumpur
Bears' Cave	Romania	Located in Chișcău village, Bihor County
Bellamar Caves	Cuba	Located near Matanzas
Bing Cave	Germany	Located near Wiesenttal, Bavaria
Blanchard Springs Caverns	United States	Located in the Ozark–St. Francis National Forest, Arkansas
Blanche Cave	Australia	Located in the Naracoorte Caves National Park, South Australia
Blue Grotto	Croatia	Sea cave, located on Biševo island, Dalmatia region
Blue John Cavern	United Kingdom	Located near Castleton, Derbyshire, England
Buchan Caves	Australia	Two caves, the Royal Cave and the Fairy Cave, located in Buchan, Victoria
Grottes de Calès	France	Located near Lamanon
Cango Caves	South Africa	Located near Oudtshoorn
Capricorn Caves	Australia	Located in Rockhampton, Queensland
Carlsbad Caverns	United States	Located in the Guadalupe Mountains, New Mexico. On the Subterranean World Heritage List
Cascade Caverns	United States	Located in Boerne, Texas
Castellana Caves	Italy	Located near Bari. On the Subterranean World Heritage List
Cathedral Cave	United Kingdom	Located near Pen-y-cae, Powys, Wales
Cathedral Caves	New Zealand	Located near Papatowai, South Island
Cave of the Lakes (Troupisio)	Greece	Located near Kastria
Cave Without a Name	United States	Located near Boerne, Texas
Cox's Cave	United Kingdom	Located in Cheddar Gorge, Somerset
Craighead Caverns	United States	Located in Tennessee
Cross Cave	Slovenia	
Crystal Cave	United States	Located in Put-In-Bay, Ohio. The world's largest known geode, a celestine geode 35 ft (11 m) in diameter, lies at its widest point
Crystal Cave	Bermuda	Located in Hamilton Parish, close to Castle Harbour.
Dan yr Ogof	United Kingdom	Located near Pen-y-cae, Powys, Wales
Dechen Cave	Germany	Located near Iserlohn
Deer Cave	Malaysia	Located near Miri, Sarawak
Dirou Pyrgos Caves	Greece	Two caves, Glyfada Cave and Alepotrypa cave, with underground river, near Pyrgos Dirou
Devil's Throat Cave	Bulgaria	Located in the western Rhodope Mountains, near Gyovren
Dobšiná Ice Cave	Slovakia	Located near Dobšiná
Doolin Cave (Pol an Ionain)	Ireland	Located in Doolin
Dragon Caves (Cuevas del Drach)	Spain	Located on the island of Mallorca, with concerts
Dupnisa Cave	Turkey	Located in Kırklareli Province
Eisriesenwelt	Austria	Located near Salzburg
El Soplao Cave	Spain	Located in Cantabria
Erdmanns Cave	Germany	Located near Lörrach
Fantastic Caverns	United States	Located near Springfield, Missouri
Frasassi Caves	Italy	Located near Ancona
Gough's Cave	United Kingdom	Located in Cheddar Gorge, Somerset
Gouffre de Padirac	France	Near Gramat, Lot. 103 m (338 ft)-deep entrance shaft into an underground river
Great Masson Cavern	United Kingdom	Located near Matlock Bath, Derbyshire
Great Rutland Cavern	United Kingdom	Located near Matlock Bath, Derbyshire
Grotta Gigante	Italy	Located near Trieste
Grotte de Chorance	France	Located near Chorance, Isère
Grottes de Saint-Christophe	France	Located in Saint-Christophe-la-Grotte, Savoie
Grotte aux Fées	Switzerland	Located near Saint-Maurice, Valais. Contains an underground waterfall
Grutas de Cacahuamilpa	Mexico	Located in the Grutas de Cacahuamilpa National Park, Guerrero
Gunns Plains Cave	Australia	Located on Tasmania island
Hams Caves (Coves dels Hams)	Spain	Located on the island of Mallorca
Han-sur-Lesse Caves (Grottes de Han)	Belgium	Located near Han-sur-Lesse
Harrison's Cave	Barbados	Access by tram
Hato Caves	Curaçao	Located near Willemstad
Hazrat Daoud pilgrimage cave	Uzbekistan	Located near Nurobod
Hercules Caves	Morocco	Archaeological cave complex in Cape Spartel
Horne Lake Caves	Canada	Located in the Horne Lake Caves Provincial Park near Nanaimo, British Columbia
Hotton Caves	Belgium	Located near Hotton
Howe Caverns	United States	Located in New York State
Huanglong Cave	China	Located in Zhangjiajie-Wulingyuan, Hunan
Ingleborough Cave	United Kingdom	Located near Clapham, North Yorkshire
Inner Space Cavern	United States	Located near Georgetown, Texas
Jeita Grotto	Lebanon	Located near Jeita
Jenolan Caves	Australia	Located in the Blue Mountains, New South Wales. The oldest known caves (340 myr). With concerts
Kartchner Caverns	United States	Located in the Kartchner Caverns State Park near Benson, Arizona
Kents Cavern	United Kingdom	Located in Torquay, Devon
Koněprusy Caves	Czech Republic	Located southwest of Prague
Kungur Ice Cave	Russia	Located in Kungur near Perm
Lamprechtsofen	Austria	Located near Salzburg
La Verna Cave	France	Located in Sainte-Engrâce. With the largest chamber in a show cave
Ledenika	Bulgaria	Located in the Balkan Mountains near Vratsa
Lewis and Clark Caverns	United States	Located east of Whitehall, Montana
Linville Caverns	United States	Located near Marion, North Carolina
Luray Caverns	United States	Locaded near Luray, Virginia
Magura Cave	Bulgaria	Located in the Balkan Mountains near Belogradchik. With concerts
Mammoth Cave	United States	Located in Kentucky. The world's longest caves system. On the Subterranean World Heritage List
Manjanggul	South Korea	A lava tube. Located on Jeju Island
Marble Cave	Ukraine	Located in Crimea
Marble Arch Caves	United Kingdom	Located in County Fermanagh, Northern Ireland
Mark Twain Cave	United States	Located near Hannibal, Missouri
Melissani Cave	Greece	An underground lake on Cephalonia island
Meramec Caverns	United States	Located near Stanton, Missouri
Mladeč Caves	Czech Republic	Located near Mladeč
Moravian Karst	Czech Republic	Located near Blansko
Nahal Me'arot/Wadi el-Mughara Caves	Israel	Located in the Nahal Me'arot Nature Reserve (four Caves Creek) near Haifa. On the Subterranean World Heritage List
Natural Bridge Caverns	United States	Located in Comal County, Texas
Neptune's Grotto	Italy	A sea cave near Alghero, Sardinia
Nerja Caves	Spain	Located in Nerja, Málaga. With concerts
New Athos Cave	Georgia	Located near New Athos. With mini-metro
Ngārua Caves	New Zealand	Located between Motueka and Tākaka in the South Island
Ohio Caverns	United States	Located near Salem Township, Champaign County, Ohio
Orlova Chuka	Bulgaria	Located in the Danubian Plain, near Ruse
Painted Cave	Spain	Located near Galdar on Gran Canaria, Canary Islands
Phong Nha Cave	Vietnam	Located near Quang Binh
Peak Cavern	United Kingdom	Located near Castleton, Derbyshire, England
Poole's Cavern	United Kingdom	Located near Buxton, England
Pont-d'Arc Cave (Caverne du Pont-d'Arc)	France	Show cave replica of Chauvet Cave, near Vallon-Pont-d'Arc. On the Subterranean World Heritage List
Postojna Cave	Slovenia	Located near Postojna. The longest show cave in Europe and the birthplace of speleobiology; with small trains and concerts
Reed Flute Cave (Lúdí Yán)	China	Located in Guilin, Guangxi
Resava Cave	Serbia	
Ruakuri Cave	New Zealand	Located in Waitomo District
Saeva dupka	Bulgaria	Pre-Balkan, near Lovech
Scărișoara Cave	Romania	Located in Gârda de Sus, Alba County
Seven-star Cave (Qīxīng Yán)	China	Located in Guilin, Guangxi
Shaitan-Koba	Ukraine	Located in Crimea
Skelska Cave	Ukraine	Located in Crimea
Škocjan Caves	Slovenia	Located in Matavun. On the Subterranean World Heritage List
Syrau Dragon Cave (Drachenhöhle Syrau)	Germany	Located near Syrau
Smoo Cave	United Kingdom	Located in Durness, Scotland
Snezhanka Cave	Bulgaria	Located in the Rhodope Mountains, near Peshtera
Sonora Caverns	United States	Located in Sonora, Texas
Speedwell Cavern	United Kingdom	Located near Castleton, Derbyshire, England
St. Michael's Cave	Gibraltar	With concerts
Stump Cross Caverns	United Kingdom	Located near Pateley Bridge, North Yorkshire
Tabon Caves	Philippines	Located near Quezon, Palawan
Tapagem Cave (Caverna da Tapagem)	Brazil	Located in Iporanga
Tapolca Caves	Hungary	Located in Tapolca, with underground river
Te Ana -The Caves	New Zealand	Sea-formed limestone cave system near Kaikōura
Te Ana-au Caves	New Zealand	Located on the shore of Lake Te Anau, Fiordland National Park, South Island, with underground river. Accessible only by boat.
Tham Luang Nang Non	Thailand	Scene of the Tham Luang cave rescue
Thiên Đường Cave	Vietnam	Located near Đồng Hới
Timpanogos Cave	United States	Located in the Timpanogos Cave National Monument near Highland, Utah
Tom Taylor's Cave	United Kingdom	Located near Pateley Bridge, North Yorkshire
Treak Cliff Cavern	United Kingdom	Located near Castleton, Derbyshire
Uhlovitsa	Bulgaria	Located in the Rhodope Mountains, near Smolyan
Valeron Caves	Spain	Located in Santa María de Guía de Gran Canaria, Canary Islands
Viento Cave (Cueva del Viento)	Spain	Located on Tenerife, Canary Islands. The largest lava tube system in Europe
Verdes Cave (Cueva de los Verdes)	Spain	A lava tube, located in Haría on Lanzarote, Canary Islands
Verteba Cave	Ukraine	Located in Bilche-Zolote
Vilenica Cave	Slovenia	The oldest show cave in Europe
Vjetrenica	Bosnia and Herzegovina	The most biodiverse cave in the world
Vorontsova Cave	Russia	Located near Sochi
Výpustek Cave	Czech Republic	Located in Křtiny. Part of the Moravian Karst Protected Landscape Area
Waitomo Glowworm Cave	New Zealand	Located in the Waitomo District, North Island
White Scar Caves	United Kingdom	Located near Ingleton, North Yorkshire
Wonder Cave	United States	Located in San Marcos, Texas
Wookey Hole Caves	United Kingdom	Located in Somerset, England
Yagodinska Cave	Bulgaria	The longest cave in the Rhodope Mountains, located near Smolyan. Contains a very large number of cave formations; contains rare cave pearls
Zbrašov Aragonite Caves	Czech Republic	Located in Teplice nad Bečvou

== See also ==
- List of caves
- List of deepest caves
- List of longest caves
- List of longest cave by country
- List of show mines
- Speleology – Science of cave and karst systems
