= Hato, Curaçao =

Hato
- Village
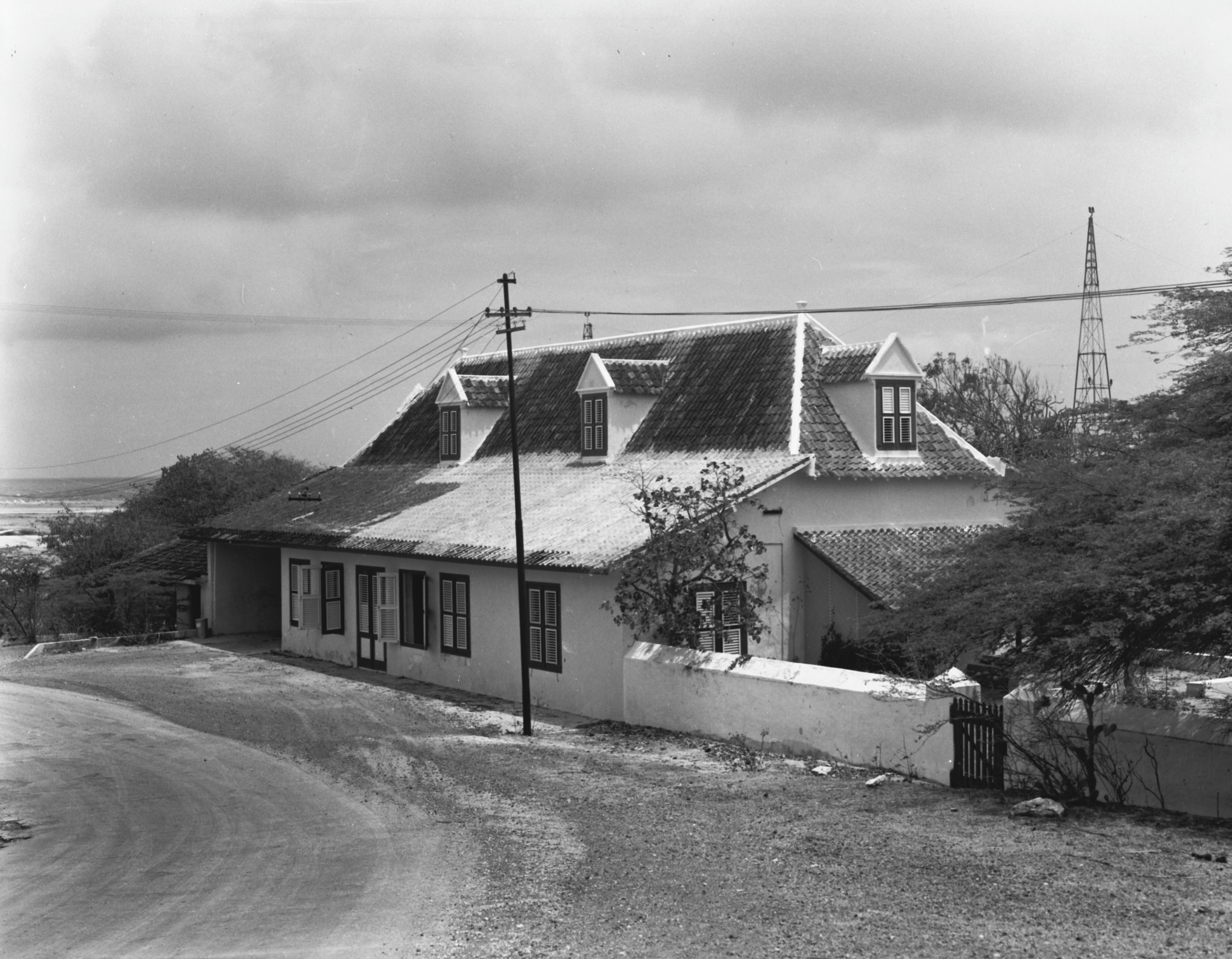
- House in Hato

- Location in Curaçao
- Coordinates: 12.19989°N 68.98870°W
- State: Kingdom of the Netherlands
- Country: Curaçao
- City: Willemstad

Population (2011)
  - Total: 45

Hato is a village in Curaçao. It started as a plantation of the Dutch West Indies Company. The Curaçao International Airport has been built on the former plantation grounds. The Hato Caves are located near the village and airport. The caves consist of marine coral limestone, and are a major tourist attraction.

== History ==
Hato started as a plantation of the Dutch West Indies Company (WIC). The purpose of the plantation was not just agriculture, but was also used as a holding area for unsold slaves. The WIC used to operate three plantations. In 1707, it was decided to rent out the plantations. By 1716, Hato was the only remaining WIC plantation.

In July 1716, the Gelderland arrived in Curaçao with 146 slaves. 80 were not sold right away, and moved to the negro house in Hato. Soon after, the negro house was set on fire by the newly arrived slaves. In October 1716, Christiaen Mulder, the overseer, was attacked and killed. The slaves proceeded to his house where they killed his wife and children. The 80 slaves from the Gelderland were arrested for the crime. Five male slaves and one female were burnt alive, the remaining slaves were broken by the wheel.

On 5 July 1750, a group of slaves from Willemstad managed to escape from the city, and moved towards the Hato plantation. In the early morning, they attacked the plantation slaves with guns and machetes killing 59. The escaped slaves then took command of the plantation. Governor Faesch responded by sending his soldiers to the plantation who killed many of the rebel slaves, and captured 47 alive. Later, 34 were sentenced to death by decapitation.

The Curaçao International Airport has been built on the former plantation grounds, and was initially called Hato Airport. In 1954, the name was changed to Dr. Albert Plesman airport. The airport is nowadays called Curaçao International Airport.

Campo Alegre, the former open-air brothel was located in Hato.

== Climate ==
Climate data for Hato (1991-2020 normals, extremes 1951–present)
Month	Jan	Feb	Mar	Apr	May	Jun	Jul	Aug	Sep	Oct	Nov	Dec	Year
Record high °C (°F)	35.8 (96.4)	32.8 (91.0)	33.2 (91.8)	34.7 (94.5)	36.1 (97.0)	37.5 (99.5)	35.3 (95.5)	37.4 (99.3)	38.3 (100.9)	38.4 (101.1)	35.6 (96.1)	33.0 (91.4)	38.4 (101.1)
Mean daily maximum °C (°F)	30.3 (86.5)	30.5 (86.9)	31.0 (87.8)	31.6 (88.9)	32.2 (90.0)	32.5 (90.5)	32.4 (90.3)	33.2 (91.8)	33.4 (92.1)	32.7 (90.9)	31.6 (88.9)	30.6 (87.1)	31.8 (89.2)
Daily mean °C (°F)	27.3 (81.1)	27.5 (81.5)	27.9 (82.2)	28.7 (83.7)	29.2 (84.6)	29.4 (84.9)	29.3 (84.7)	30.0 (86.0)	30.1 (86.2)	29.5 (85.1)	28.6 (83.5)	27.7 (81.9)	28.8 (83.8)
Mean daily minimum °C (°F)	24.2 (75.6)	24.4 (75.9)	24.9 (76.8)	25.6 (78.1)	26.3 (79.3)	26.4 (79.5)	26.2 (79.2)	26.6 (79.9)	26.6 (79.9)	26.2 (79.2)	25.5 (77.9)	24.8 (76.6)	25.6 (78.1)
Record low °C (°F)	19.4 (66.9)	20.6 (69.1)	21.3 (70.3)	21.6 (70.9)	22.0 (71.6)	22.4 (72.3)	22.0 (71.6)	21.0 (69.8)	21.7 (71.1)	21.2 (70.2)	21.9 (71.4)	20.2 (68.4)	19.4 (66.9)
Average precipitation mm (inches)	65.9 (2.59)	38.1 (1.50)	25.5 (1.00)	28.3 (1.11)	21.0 (0.83)	34.7 (1.37)	46.2 (1.82)	41.7 (1.64)	62.6 (2.46)	131.8 (5.19)	164.9 (6.49)	98.9 (3.89)	790.4 (31.12)
Average precipitation days (≥ 1.0 mm)	11.93	7.18	4.23	3.57	3.02	4.89	7.79	5.71	6.03	10.19	13.52	13.20	94.25
Source: meteo-climat-bzh

== Bibliography ==
- Benjamins, Herman Daniël; Snelleman, Johannes (1917). Encyclopaedie van Nederlandsch West-Indië (in Dutch). Leiden: Martinus Nijhoff Publishers.
