= Olina Hátlová-Tylová =

Czech luger (born 1943)

Personal information
- Full name: Oldříška Hátlová-Tylová; Oldřiška Nagenrauft
- Nationality: Czech
- Born: 25 December 1943 (age 81); Teplice nad Bečvou, Protectorate of Bohemia and Moravia

Sport
- Sport: Luge

Oldříška "Olina" Hátlová-Tylová (born 25 December 1943) is a Czech former luger. She competed for Czechoslovakia at the 1964 Winter Olympics and the 1968 Winter Olympics. She emigrated to Germany after the Prague Spring in 1968 and used the surname Nagenrauft after her marriage to Leonhard Nagenrauft, a West German luger.
