= Peshtera =

Peshtera Пещера
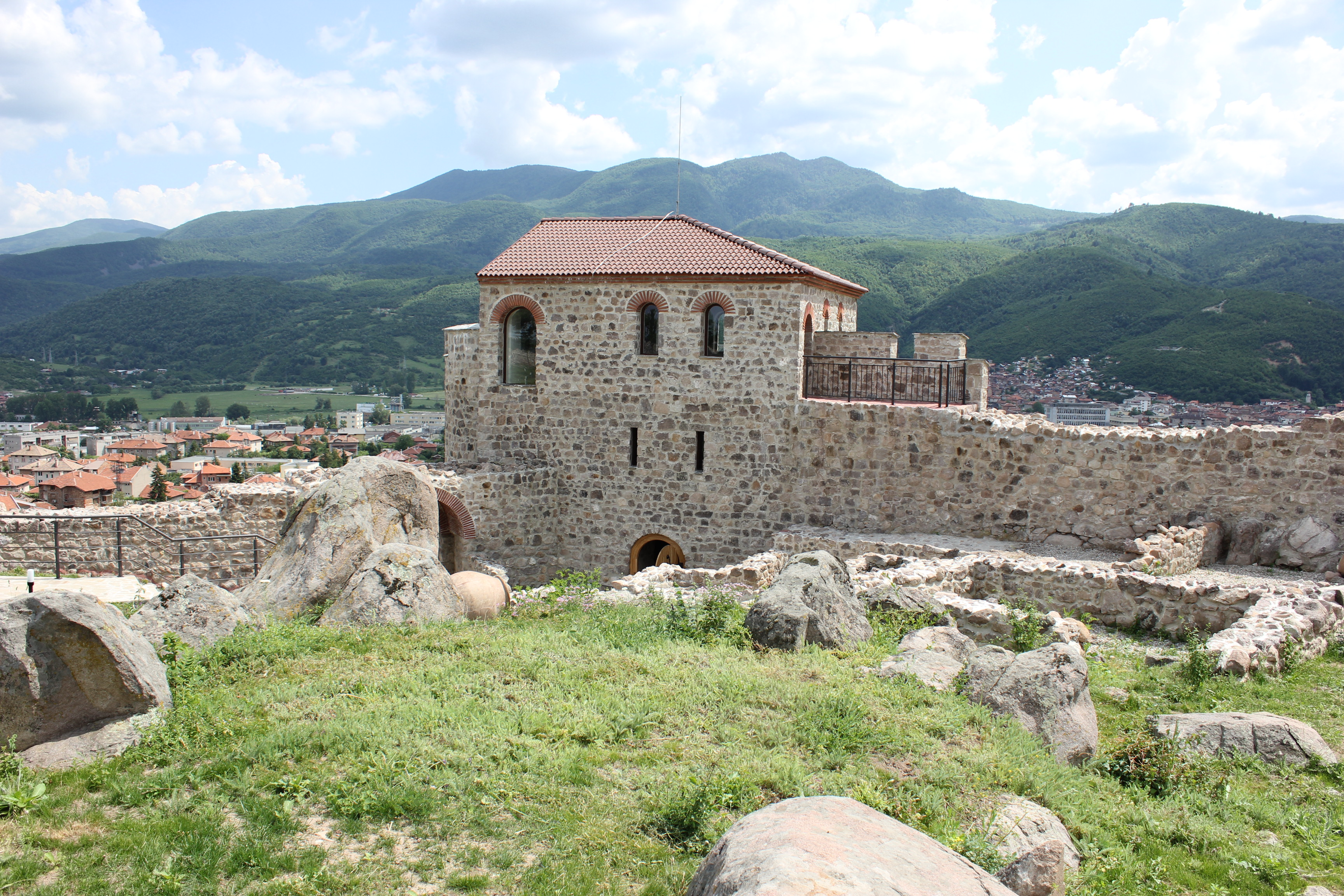
- Peristera fortress overlooking Peshtera

- Location of Peshtera in Bulgaria
- Coordinates: 42°2′N 24°18′E
- Country: Bulgaria
- Province (Oblast): Pazardzhik

Government
  - Mayor: Georgi Kozarev
- Elevation: 450 m (1,480 ft)

Population (2021)
  - City: 15,175
  - Urban: 16,983
- Time zone: UTC+2 (EET)
  - Summer (DST): UTC+3 (EEST)
- Postal Code: 4550
- Area code: 0350

Peshtera (Bulgarian: Пещера [ˈpɛʃtɛrɐ], sometimes transliterated as Peštera) is a town in the Rhodope Mountains, southern Bulgaria. It is located in Pazardzhik Province near the towns of Batak and Bratsigovo. The town is the third largest in the province after Pazardzhik and Velingrad and is the forty-fifth largest in Bulgaria. It is the administrative center of the municipality Peshtera. According to the 2021 census, Peshtera has a population of 15,175 inhabitants. At about 5 km to the south, along the road to Batak, is one of the most visited caves in Bulgaria — Snezhanka. Near the town is located the Peshtera Hydroelectric Power Station. The town is well known for producing the alcohol beverage mastika under the brand Peshterska.

== Geography ==
Peshtera (461 m asl) is located in the foothills of the Rhodope Mountains, at 18 km from Pazardzhik and 38 km from Plovdiv and 125 km from the national capital Sofia. The river Stara reka, a right tributary of the Maritsa, flows through the town.

The local climate is temperate and sudden temperature fluctuations are uncommon. Peshtera average annual temperature is 12.6 °C. Rainfall is relatively high – from 670 to 680 L/m^{2} year.

== Population ==
Historical population
Year	Pop.	±%
1946	8,938	—
1956	13,777	+54.1%
1965	14,619	+6.1%
1975	16,861	+15.3%
1985	18,713	+11.0%
1992	19,280	+3.0%
2001	19,411	+0.7%
2011	16,746	−13.7%
2021	12,870	−23.1%
Source: pop-stat.mashke.org

The population of Peshtera includes several ethnic communities. Bulgarians are prevailing, but there are also Turks, Roma and Aromanians. The latter ones have established an Aromanian cultural organization in Peshtera and have their own cultural tradition in the town. The number of Roma in the municipality is approximately 4,000. Different ethnic groups in the town have always lived in harmony and tolerance. Peshtera presents an example of integration and understanding of all ethnic groups.

== History ==
The first traces of human presence in the area date from the Neolithic. The Thracian tribe of the Bessi inhabited the area in Antiquity and the settlement in the Peshtera Valley emerged in the fourth century BC.

The earliest piece of writing documenting the town's name dates from 1479, when Peshtera was part of the fief of a certain Mustafa in the Ottoman Empire. During the Bulgarian National Revival, many churches, bridges, fountains, schools and houses were built. The first secular school in Peshtera was opened in 1848, while the Nadezhda ('hope') community centre emerged in 1873. Many local residents took part in the armed struggle for the Liberation of Bulgaria. Peshtera was liberated during the Russo-Turkish War of 1877–78 on 6 January 1878.

In 1876, the town had 800 households, of which 500 Bulgarian, 60 Aromanian and about 250 Turkish and Romani. The first official Bulgarian census in 1880 stated 758 households and 3,871 inhabitants, of which 2,618 Bulgarians, 856 Turks, 341 Greeks (mostly Aromanians counted as such), 53 Roma and a single Karakachan. Five years later, in 1885, Peshtera had a population of 4,704 and 876 households.

== Economy ==
Industry is the most important sector of the town's economy. The two largest factories are "Biovet Peshtera", producing antibiotics and medicines, and "Vinprom Peshtera", producing alcoholic beverages. A number of smaller plants produce metal constructions, footwear and food.

== Gallery ==
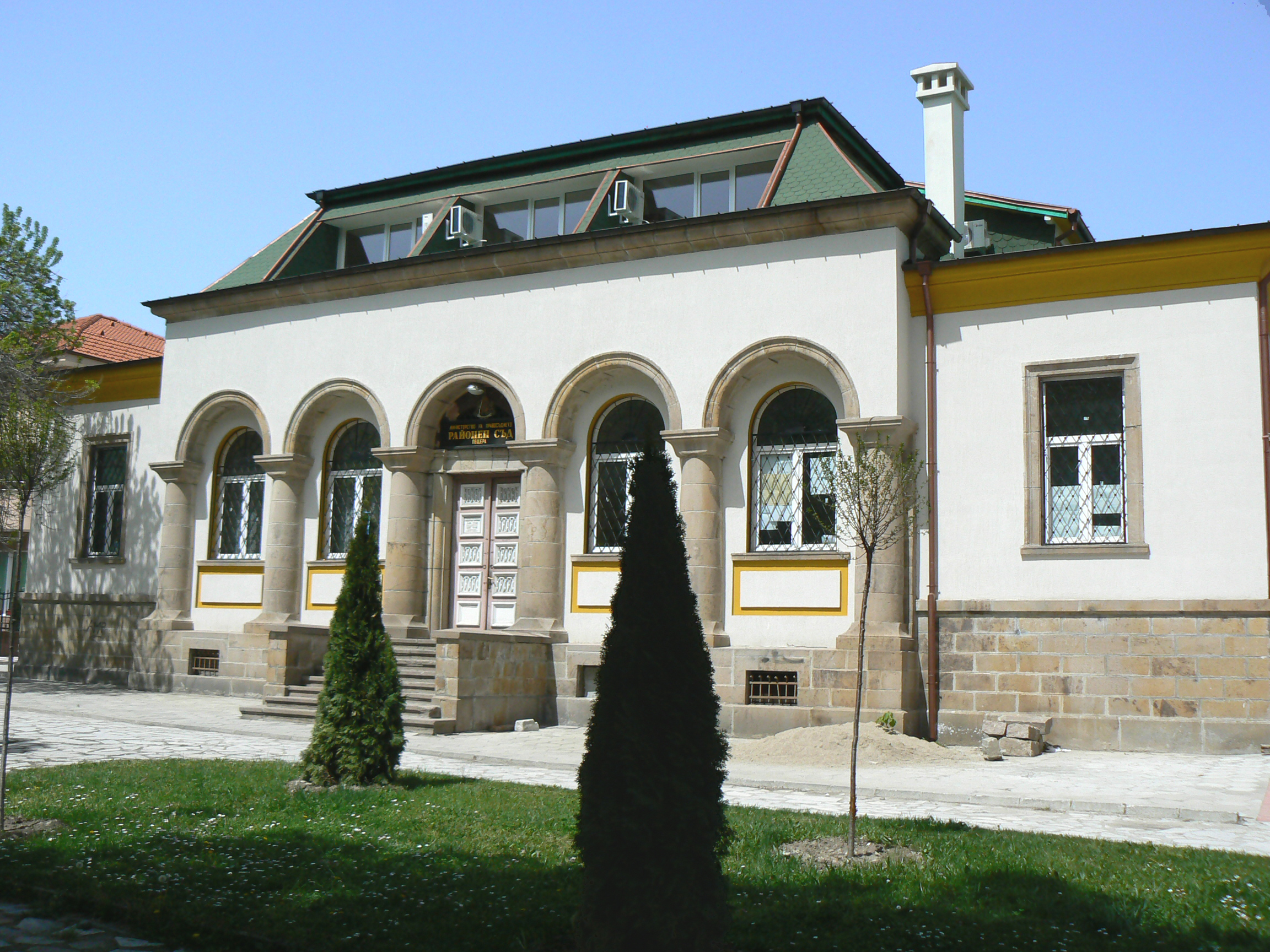
Peshtera court hall

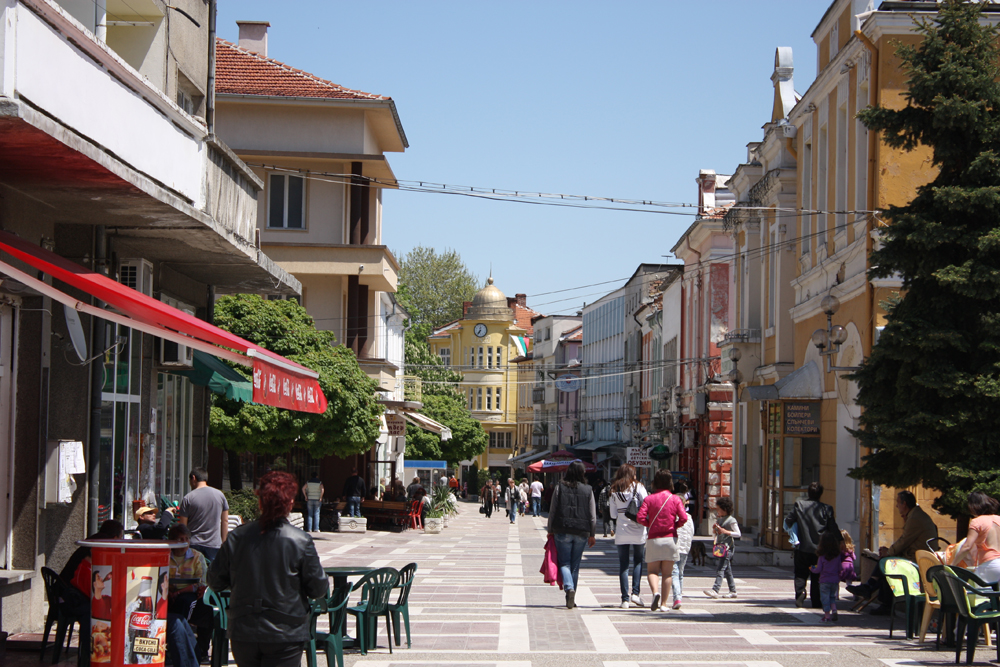
Peshtera downtown

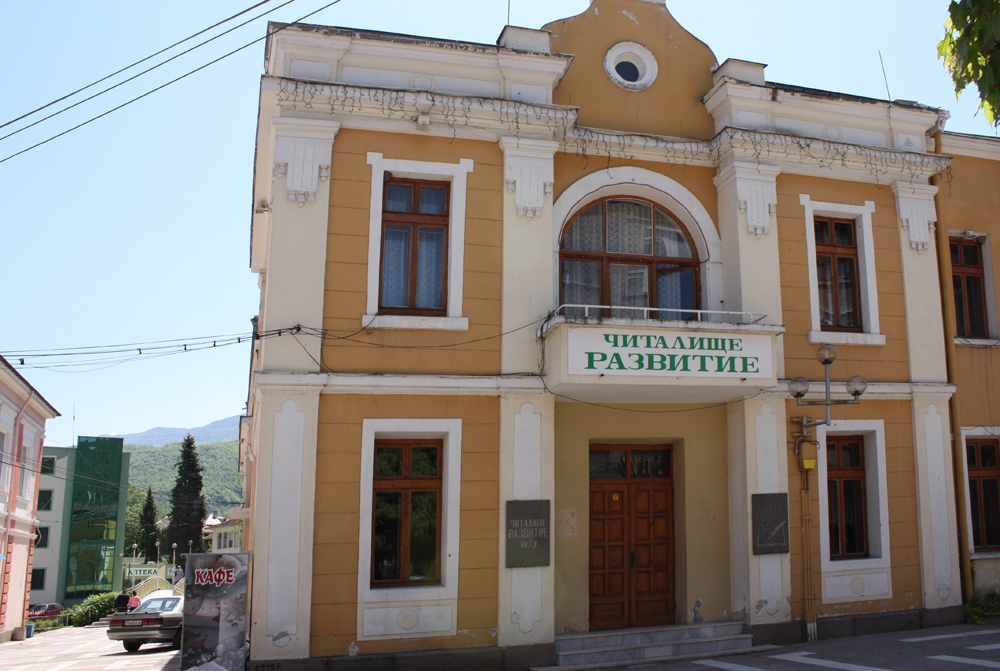
Peshtera Culture club Chitalishte "Development"

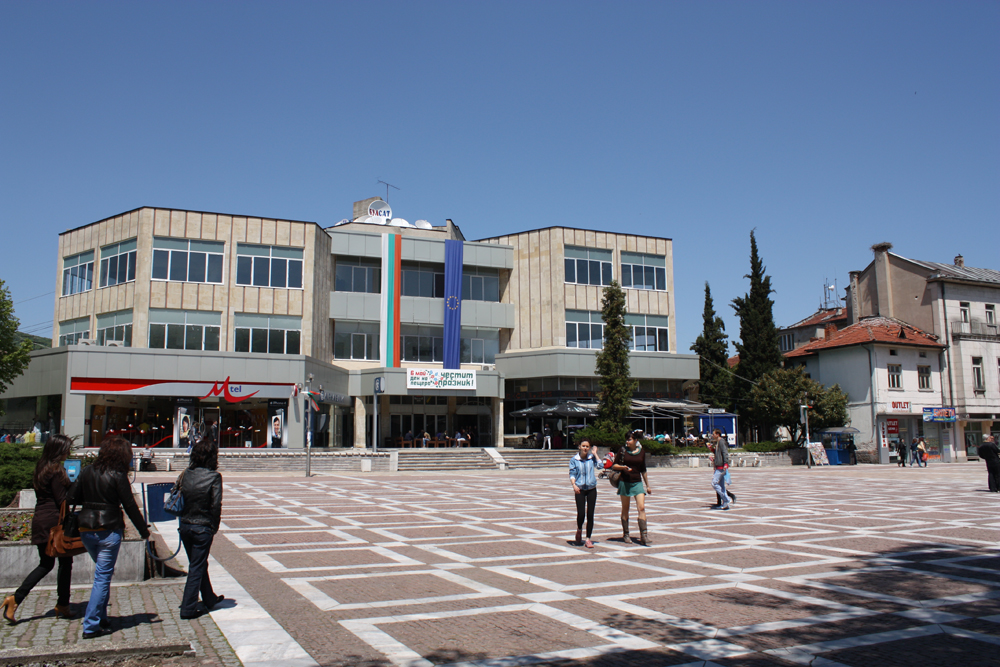
Peshtera central square

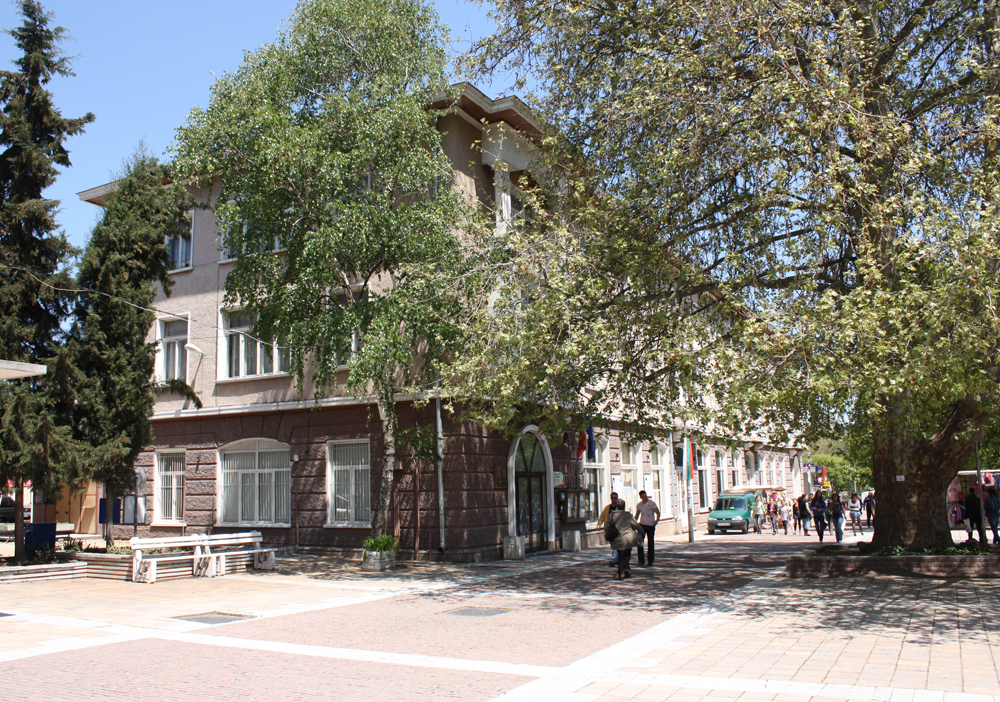
Peshtera town hall

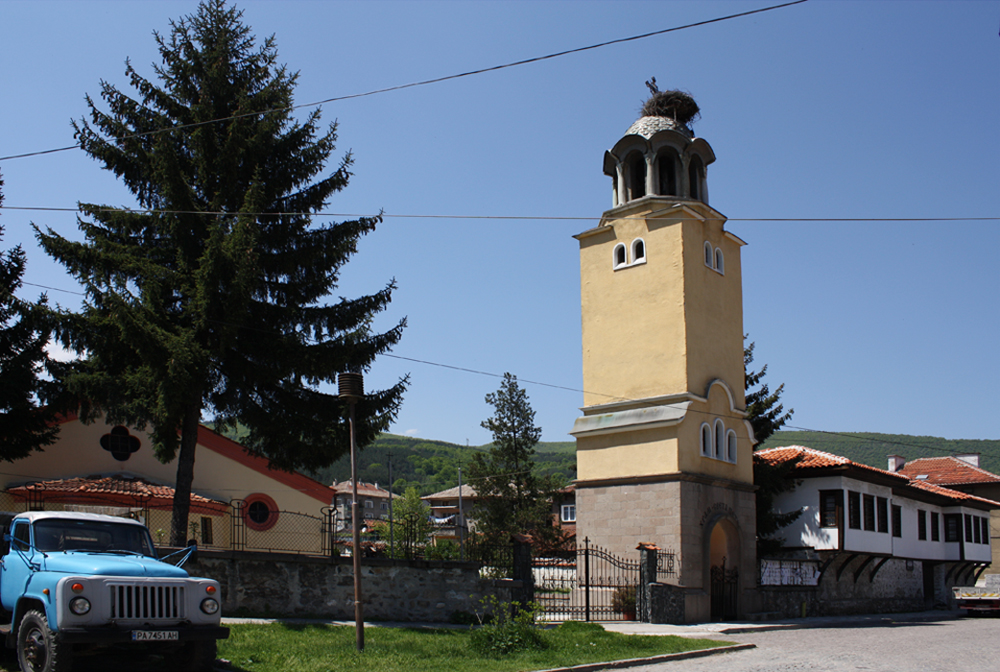
Saint Petka church and History museum of Peshtera

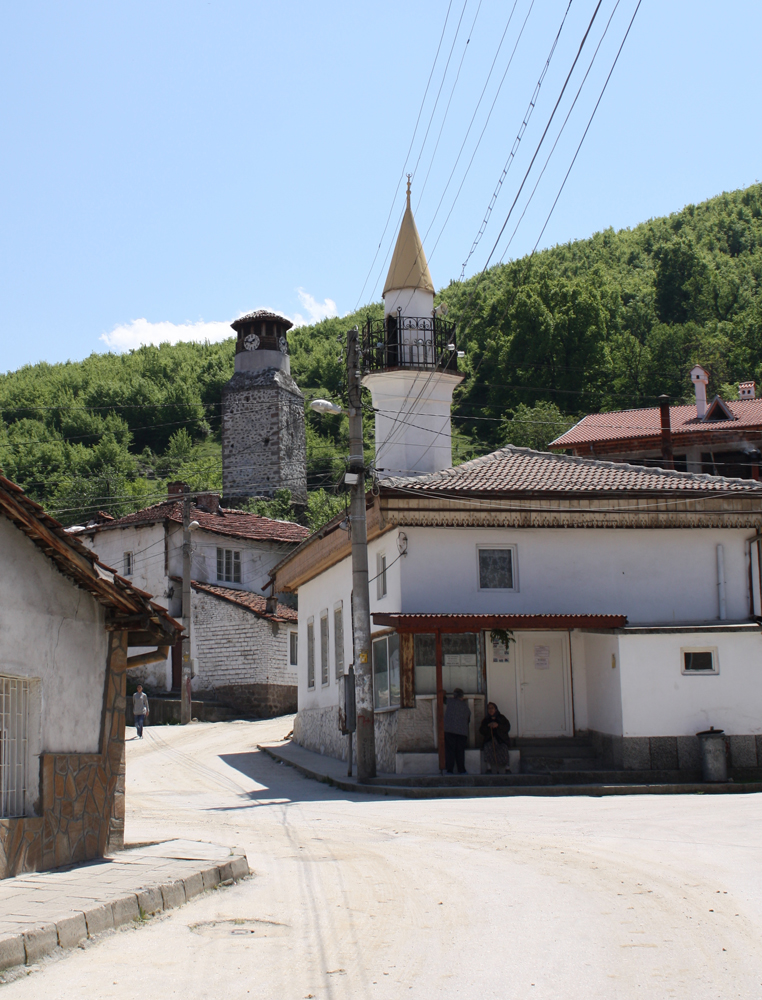
17th century-old clock tower and new mosque

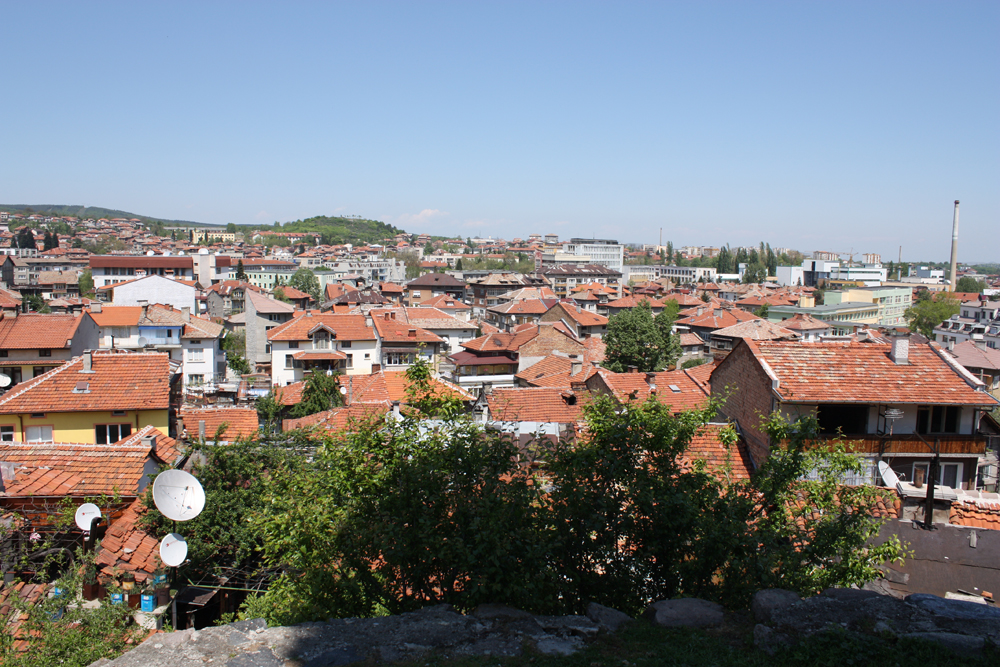
Town-scape from the Clock-tower

== Honour ==
Peshtera Glacier on Livingston Island in the South Shetland Islands, Antarctica is named after Peshtera.
