= Zbrašov Aragonite Caves =

Cave in the Czech Republic

Coordinates: 49.5317°N 17.7458°E

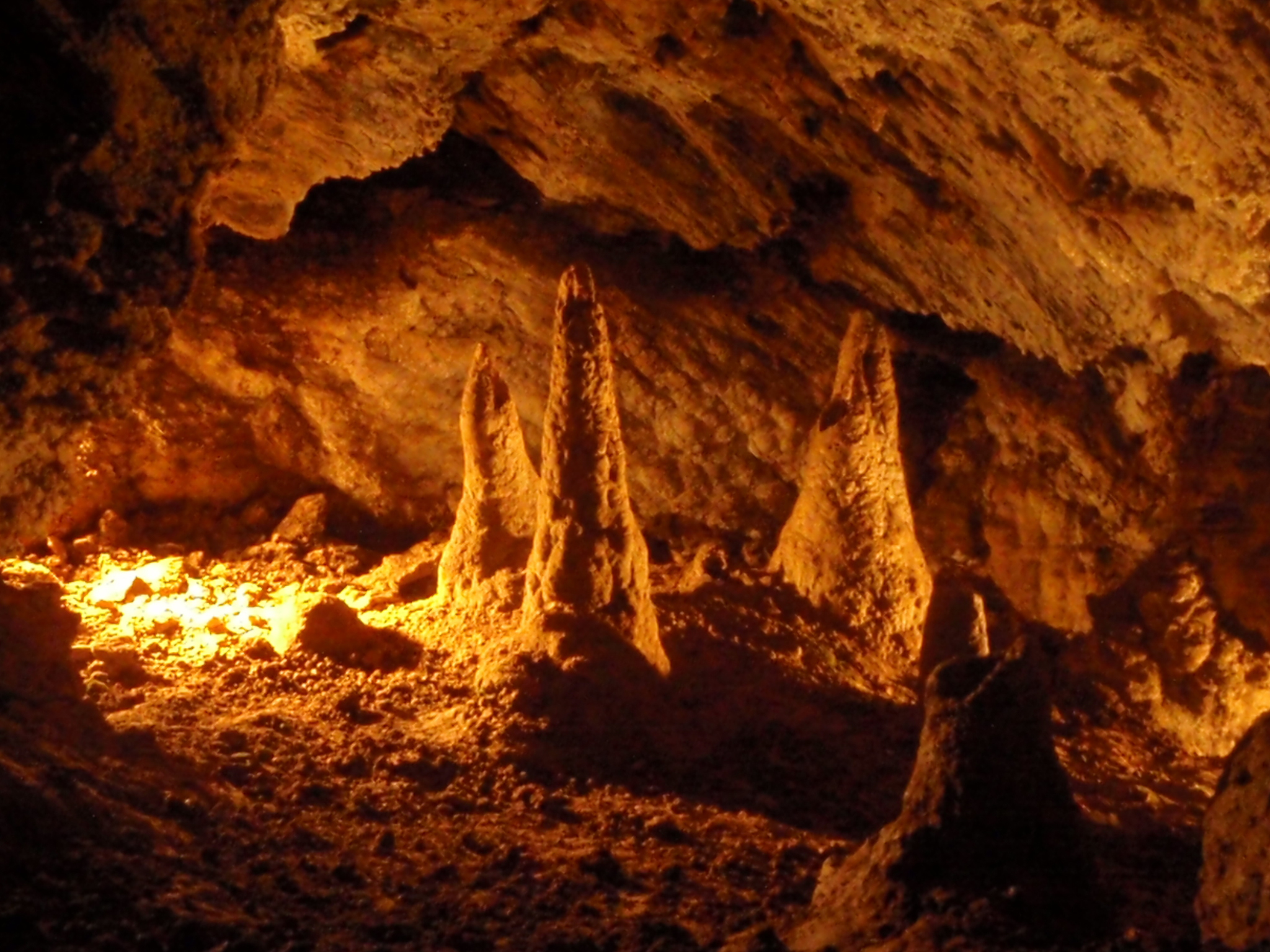
Stalagmites in the Zbrašov Aragonite Caves

The Zbrašov Aragonite Caves (Czech: Zbrašovské aragonitové jeskyně) are a national nature monument in Teplice nad Bečvou in the Olomouc Region, Czech Republic. The main object of its protection is a hydrothermal karst area of European importance. It includes the aragonite caves as well as the surrounding forests. Discovered in 1912 and opened for the public in 1926, the caves were created by both surface water and underground mineral water springs rich in carbon dioxide, that are also used in the spas of the nearby village and spa resort of Teplice nad Bečvou.

The caves are filled with formations of stalagmite and aragonite that resemble geysers and doughnuts, and the bottom levels of the caves are filled with carbon dioxide. The temperature stays around 14 °C (57 °F) throughout the year, making the caves the warmest underground area in the Czech Republic.

== Location ==
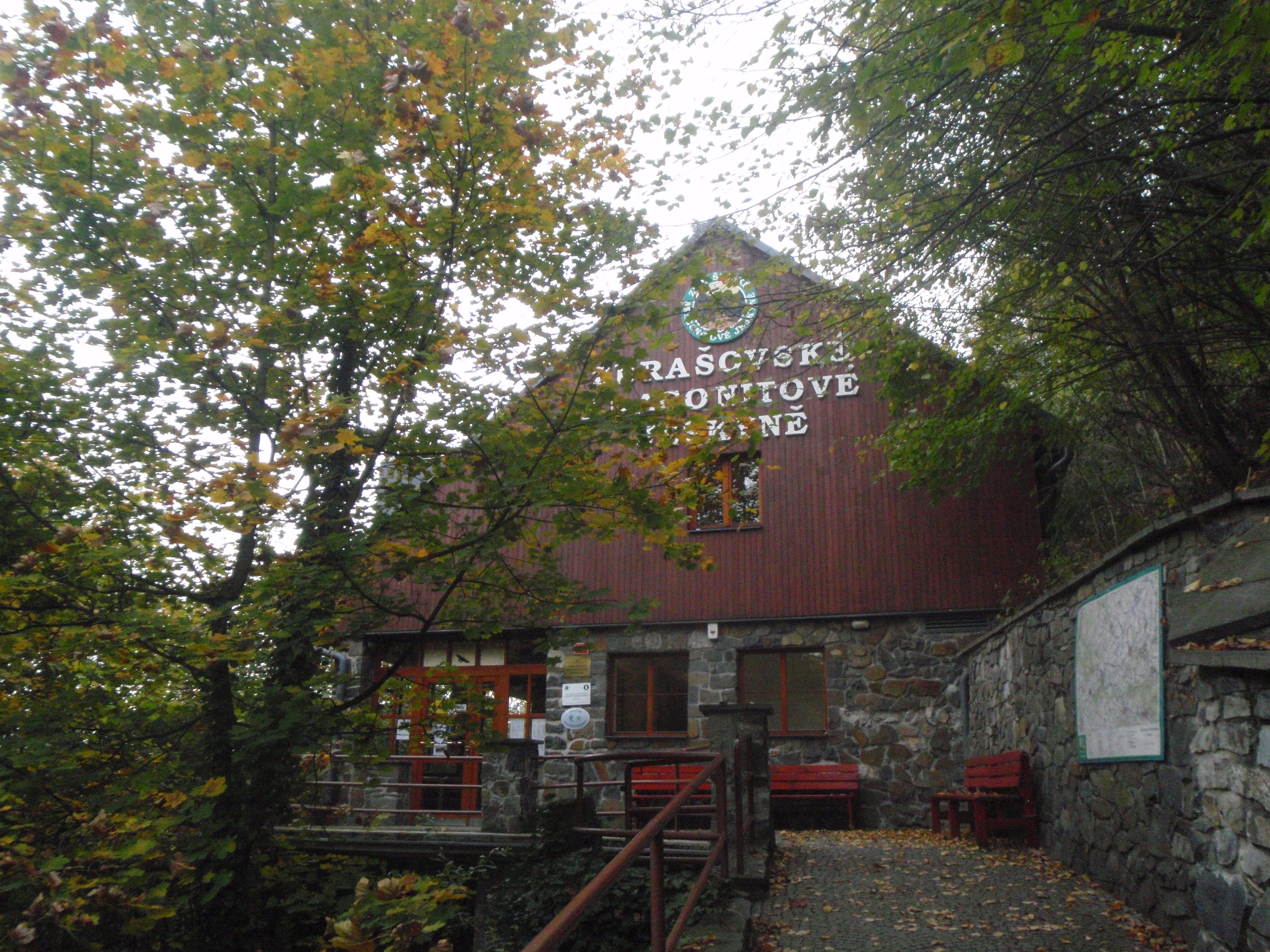
Main administrative building

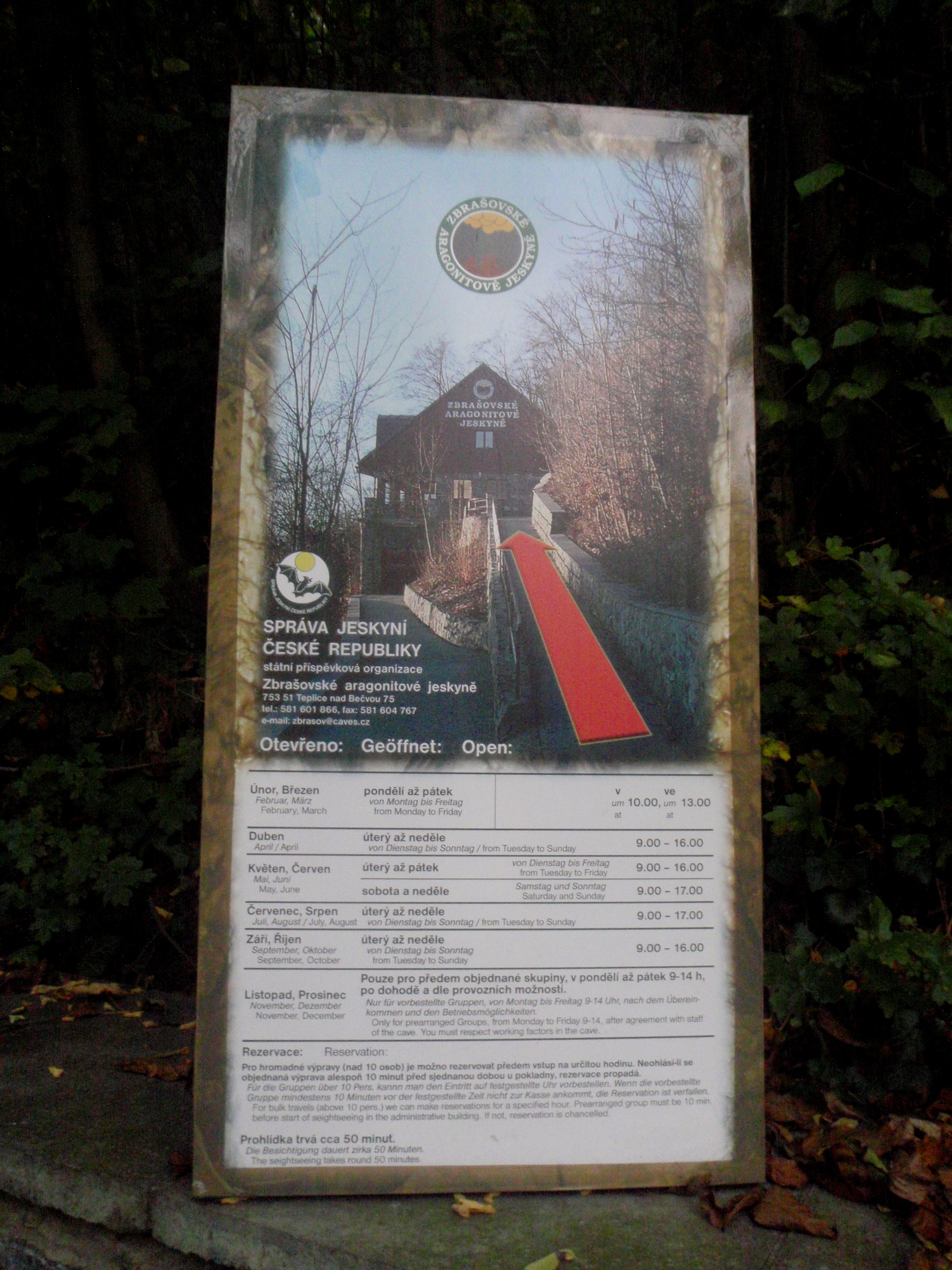
Information board on the cave system

The Zbrašov Aragonite Caves are located on the bank of the river Bečva at an altitude of 250 to 310 m (820 to 1,020 ft) above sea level. The caves are located across the river from the National Nature Reserve Hůrka. They are part of a large karst area that also includes the Hranice Abyss, which is the deepest flooded pit cave in the world.

Much of the area's surface has been, ever since the 16th century, a part of its spa site, and has thus been gradually modified into a semi-natural urban park whose technical facilities (rest areas, roads, rail) are currently in a neglected state.

The area also features buildings such as the administrative building of the Zbrašov Aragonite Caves themselves, a small chapel of Saint Peregrine, a public fountain of the Kropáč mineral spring and the villa of Ladislav Říhovský (a cultural monument of the Czech Republic), among others. Undesirable effects caused by buildings constructed in and around the NNM often come from utility line accidents. This situation is to be resolved by connecting all building to a sewerage system and removing all septic tanks and cess pools.

In the Czech Republic, there are nearly 4000 known caves. All of the caves are protected under Act No. 114/1992 Sb. on the protection of nature and landscape. The Zbrašov Aragonite Caves are among the 14 caves open to the public.

== History ==
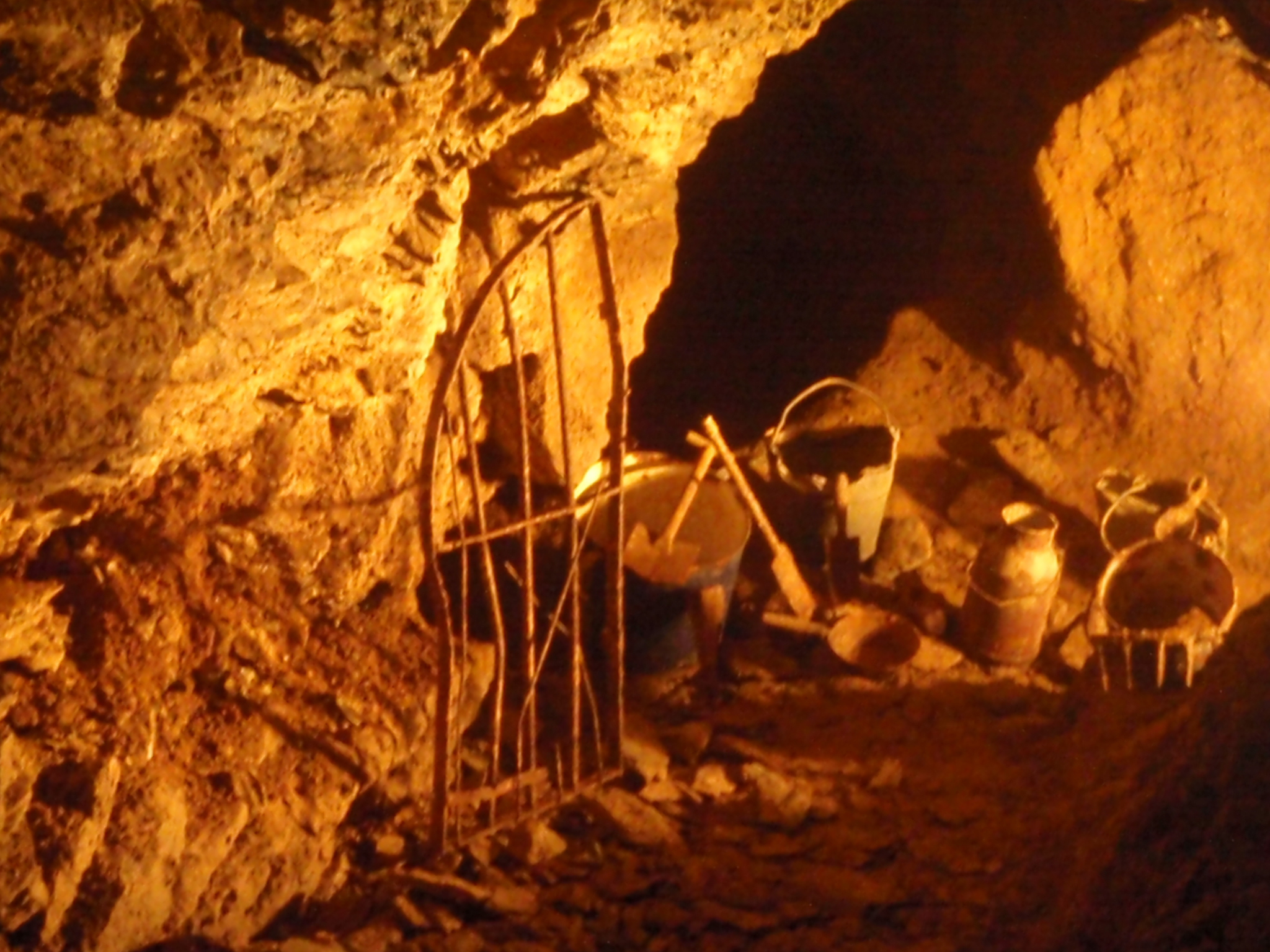
Tools used to excavate the caves

In December 1912, workers at a local quarry uncovered a crack in the rocks with warm air coming out. Brothers Josef and Čeněk Chromý were interested in the karst formations in the area and so they made the opening bigger, and in January 1913, climbed down a rope 42 m (138 ft) into the dark underground space. The rope broke and both men were trapped in the cave. Their carbide lamps were also broken in the fall, so the explorers had to wait eight hours in the dark to be rescued. Over the next few years, explorers and other members of the local volunteer miners spent their free time exploring many other parts of the 1,322 m (4,337 ft) cave system. A new, more convenient entrance from the Bečva valley was dug and electric lighting was introduced. In 1926, the cave was made open to the public.

From 2002 to 2005, the cave paths and wiring were renovated. In addition, a large amount of rock debris was removed, which had filled some natural cavities and hallways. This material had been created at the time of the original entry works and for economic reasons had not been carried out of the caves. During this renovation some parts of the system were returned to their original form.

== Natural features ==
=== Geology ===
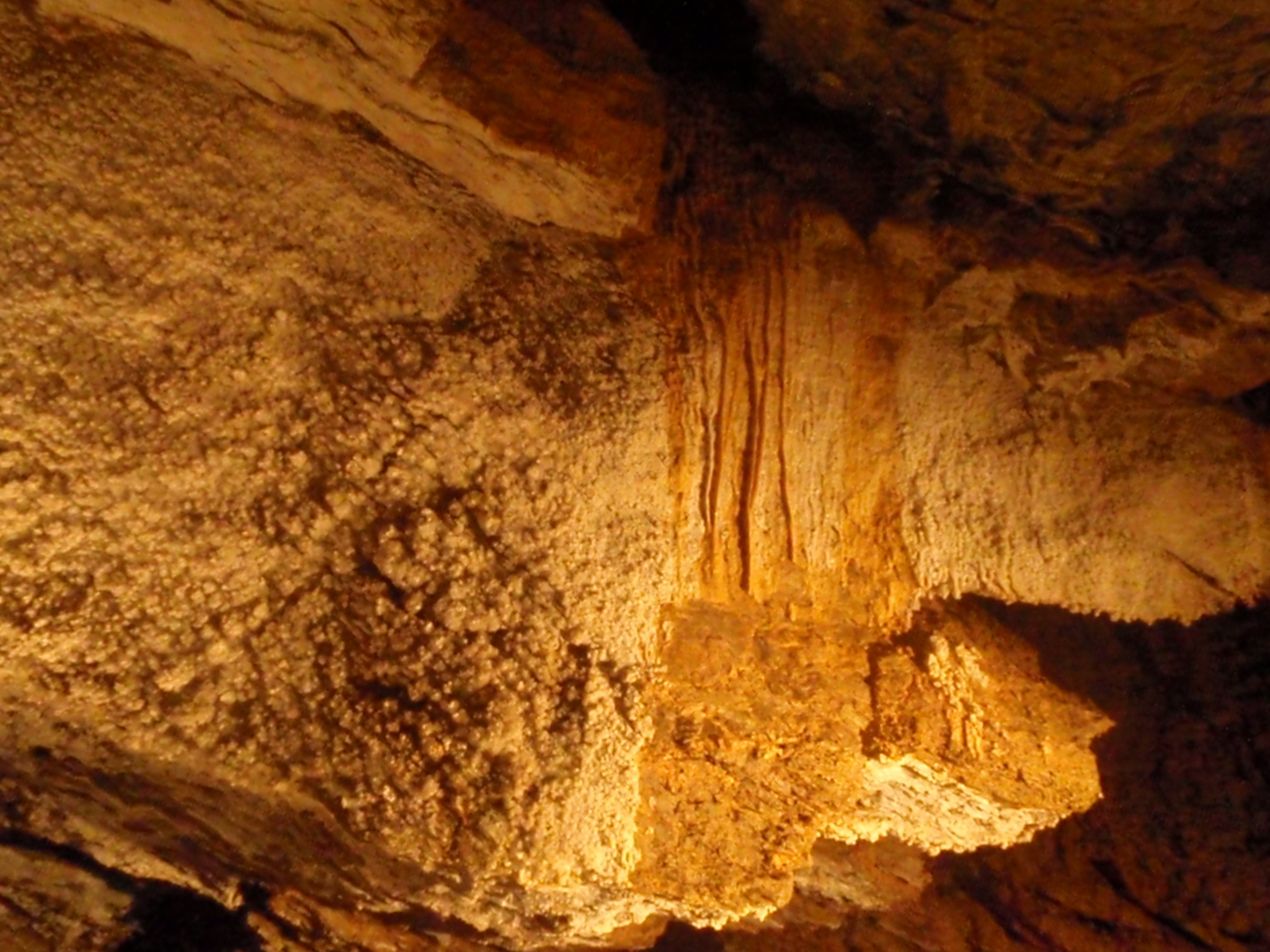
Curtain with aragonite and calcite

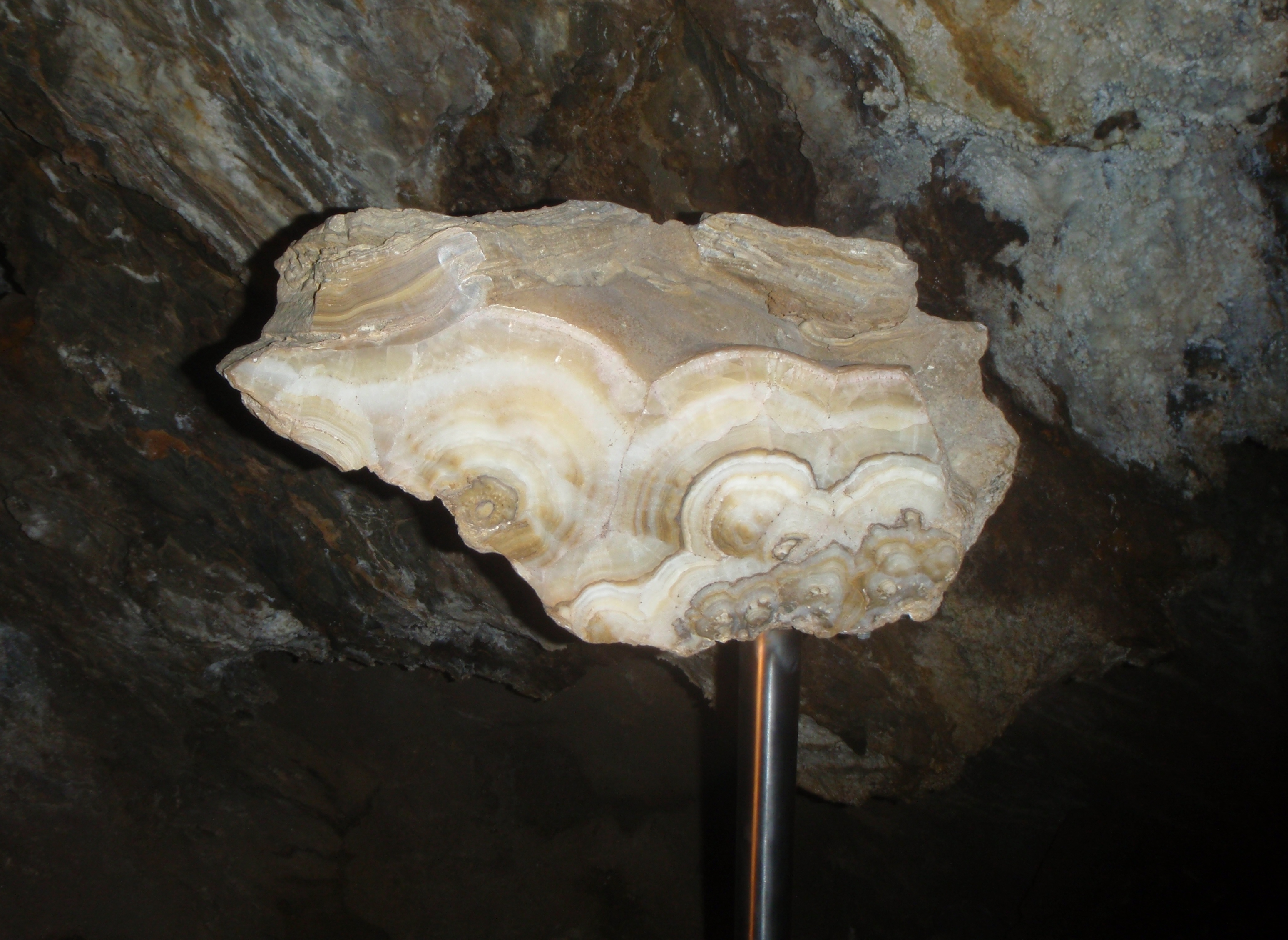
Longitudinal section of calcite formations

The geology of the area is made up of large blocks of rock. Valleys are short and form along the fault lines between these blocks. There is a layer of Devonian limestone more than 500 m (1,600 ft) thick. This is covered with a younger layer of Miocene sediments.

According to the geomorphological structure of the Czech Republic these small-scale specially protected territories are a part of the Maleník section of the Silesian-Moravian Foothills. Maleník is a rugged highland composed of culm greywacke, sandstones and shales, Devonian limestones and Miocene sediments. The highland is characterized as a cutting horst dipping to the SE with internal block structure. Valleys are short, mostly based on fault lines.

The caves developed from two completely different karst processes. The first was solution by surface water that entered the rock through cracks in the limestone and created large underground spaces. The second was deposition from saturated warm mineral water coming up from depths of up to 2 km (1.2 mi). The aragonite and calcite in the cave is formed mainly by calcium carbonate. This can crystallize in three ways. The first is the mineral calcite, which is the most common and consists of cave fillings, such as stalactites, stalagmites, sinter deposits and valances. There are raft stalagmites that are conical in shape and several tens of centimeters high. These are not found anywhere else in the world. The second type of calcium carbonite is aragonite. This forms white needle-like crystals. Water and carbon dioxide are released. Vaterite, the third and rarest form of calcium carbonate is not present.

=== Hydrology ===
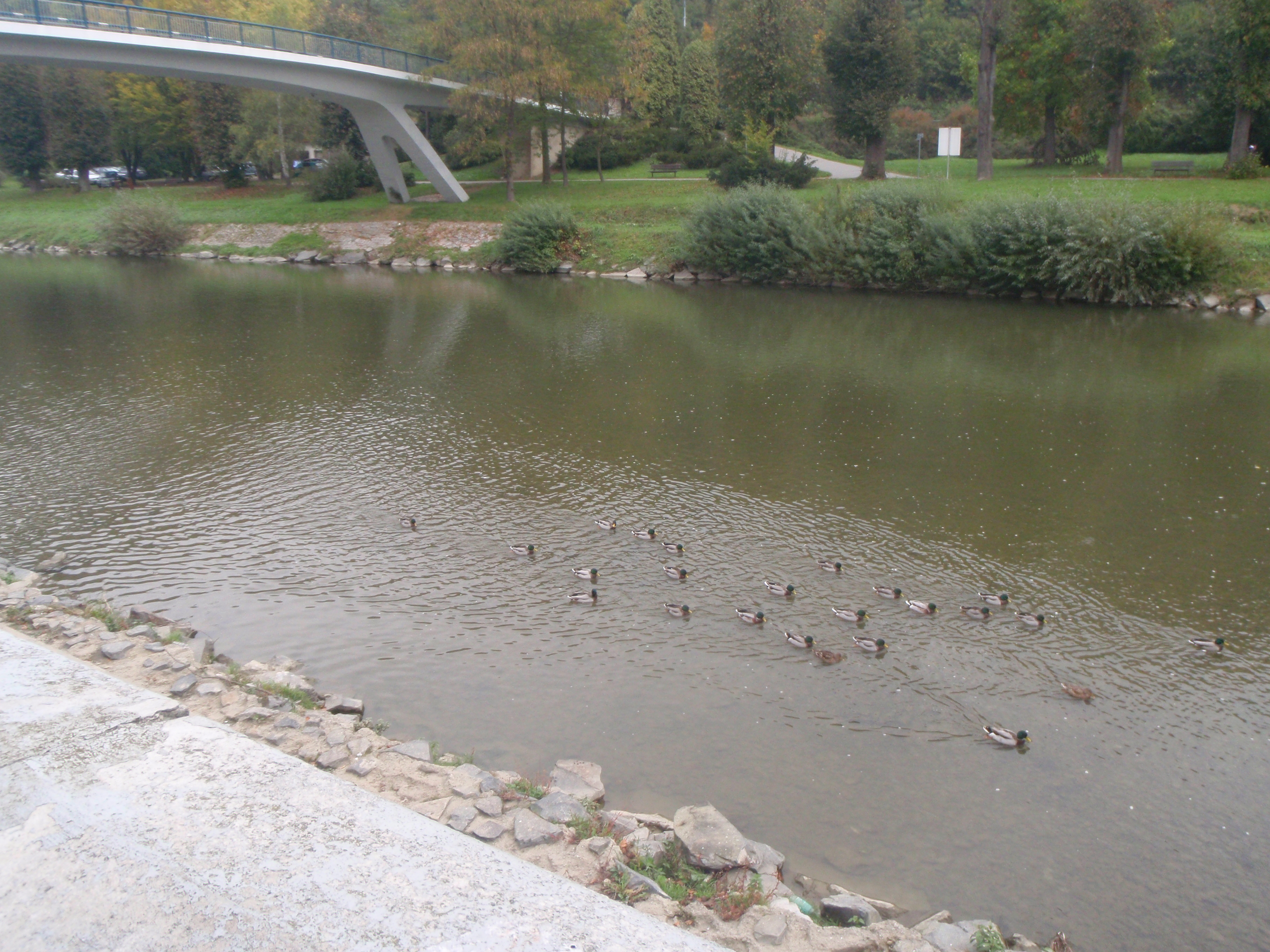
The Bečva River in Teplice nad Bečvou

The area is drained by the Bečva, which flows into the Morava. When ongoing and heavy rainfall raises the water level it can cause the river to overflow, and flood the caves. The most devastating floods in Moravia occurred in 1997 from July 5 to 16. The flood waters entered the caves and into the last dry space (the Marble Hall). This raised the levels of mineral pools and led to a gas increase in higher ground caves. Increased carbon dioxide concentration in the visitor route was solved by installing a special suction device that keeps the composition of the air at the values established by the State Mining Administration (up to 1% carbon dioxide). The extraordinary hydrological situation also led to disruption of technical equipment, but without damaging the caves' preserved state.

Mineral water emerges towards the surface in two different springs, these being the Kropáč spring - a RI borehole from a depth of 60.4 meters, and the Jurik spring - a RIII borehole from adepth of 101.8 meters. In both cases, the water is heavily mineralized, carbonic, thermal lukewarm, hypotonic mineral water of bicarbonate-calcium type. Its carbon dioxide content reaches up to 3292 mg/l and its average temperature is 22.5 °C. The Teplice nad Bečvou spa resort uses the mineral water in rehabilitative care of oncology diseases, circulatory system diseases, disorders of metabolism and endocrine glands.

=== Climate ===
The climate is moderately warm - climate region MT10 (per the Quitt Classification), which is characterized by long, warm and slightly dry summers, short transition periods of slightly warm springs and slightly warm autumns, and short, slightly warm and very dry winters with short durations of snow cover. Annually, the area experiences an average of 700 mm of precipitation and an average air temperature of 7 °C. Snow cover is limited to an average of 50–60 days per year.

=== Microclimate ===
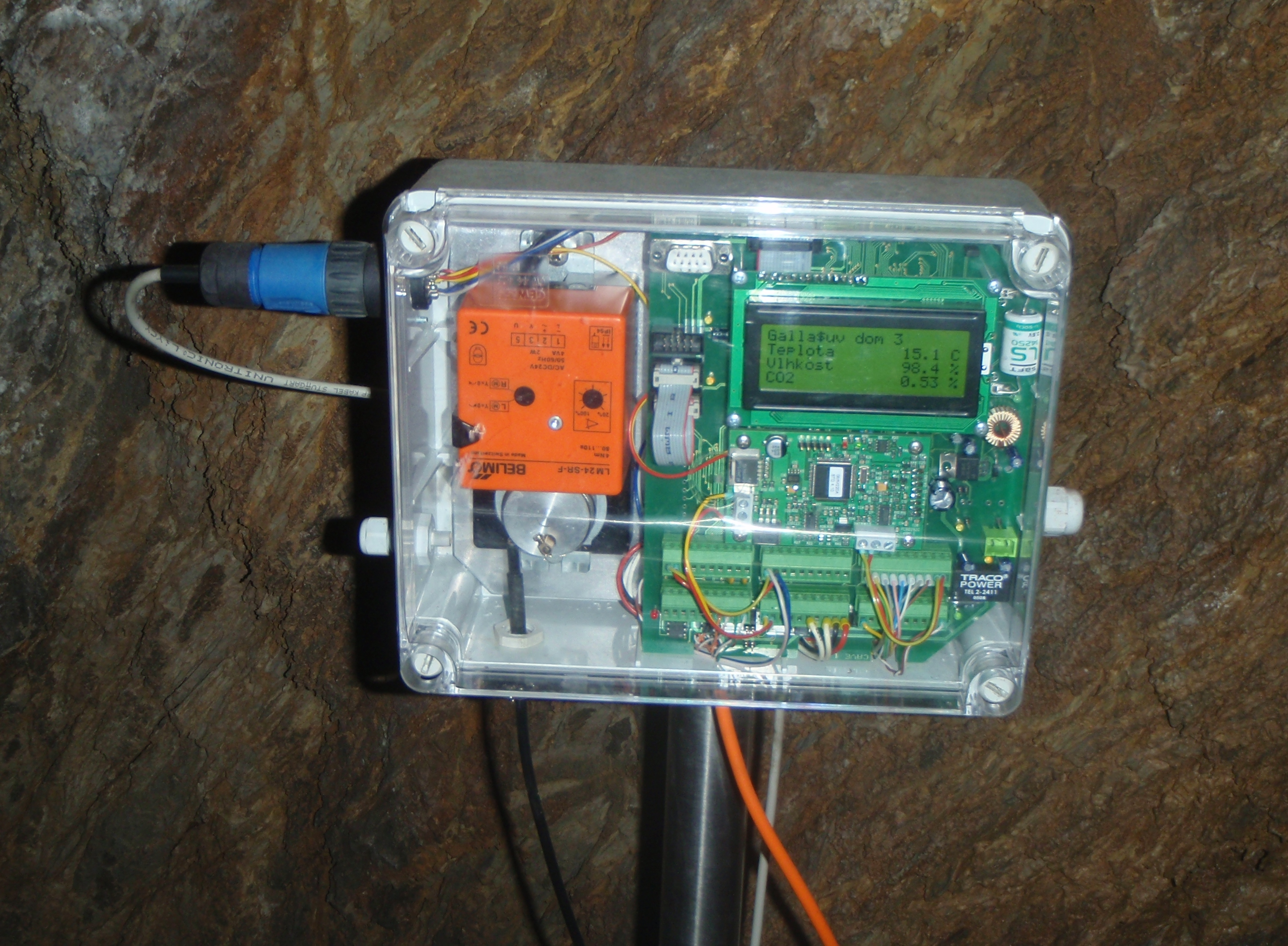
Device used to measure the concentration of carbon dioxide

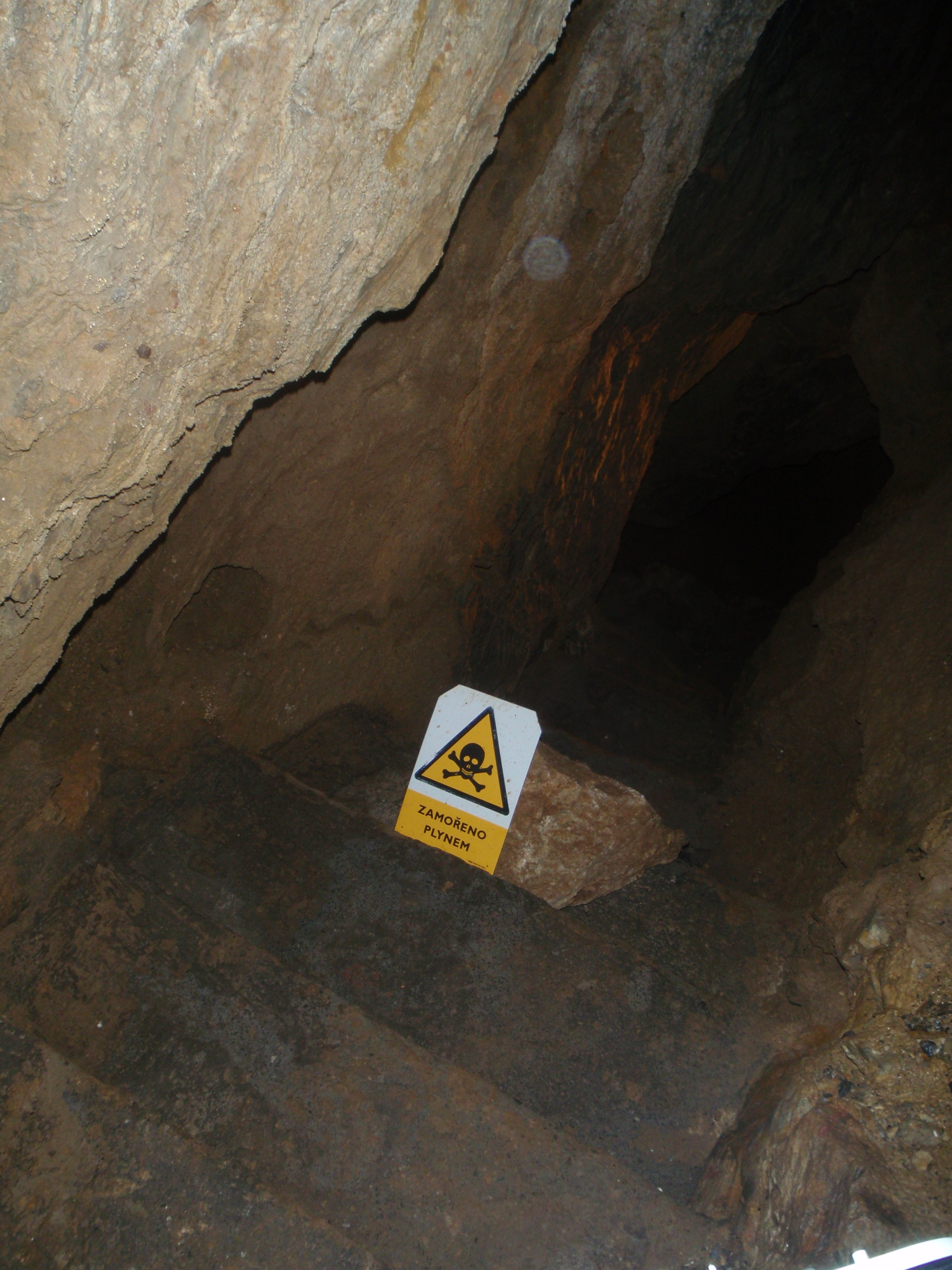
A gas lake

The karst process resulted in a unique microclimate of caves, characterized mainly by carbon dioxide emissions into their lower parts, and the creation of gas reservoirs. Some of the caves' lower areas are filled with carbon dioxide permanently. The concentration of the gas commonly reaches 40% by volume; more than 8–10% is fatal to humans. An integral part of the security measures, therefore, is the daily measurement of carbon dioxide and adapting workers and visitors to the current situation.

The carbon dioxide originates from a great depth about 40 km below the surface. It leaves the depths along underground faults towards the surface, either forming mofettas or dissolving in mineral water.

The Zbrašov Aragonite Caves are the warmest caves in the Czech Republic, with a year-round temperature of 14 °C. The relative humidity is about 98%.

=== Soil science ===
The area contains mesotrophic to eutrophic brown soils and calcareous brown soils. On steep slopes and in proximity to rocky outcrops is undeveloped land and brown rankers.

=== Flora ===
The surface of the protected area is mostly covered by a mixed coniferous forest, which has a near-natural tree composition. It consists of winter oak (Quercus petraea), beech (Fagus sylvatica), common hornbeam (Carpinus betulus), sycamore (Acer pseudoplatanus), spruce ash (Fraxinus excelsior), maple (Acer platanoides), small-leaved lime (Tilia cordata), less commonly Norway spruce (Picea abies) and silver fir (Abies alba). Mountain elm (Ulmus glabra) occurs rarely.

In the past, these forests were negatively affected by forest management, such as by logging and the subsequent planting in favor of spruce trees. In the future, these negative effects are meant to be prevented by the legal establishment of a "special purpose" forest, in which important interests require different methods of management.

The local specific environment creates favorable conditions for the existence and development of a number of endangered plant species. Major examples include: polypod (Polypodium interjectum) – highly endangered C2 species, Martagon lily (Lilium martagon) – C4 species requiring attention, hairy brome (Bromus ramosus) – endangered C3 species, and the bright chervil (Anthriscus nitida).

Non-native tree species are represented by the black locust (Robinia pseudoacacia), which needs to be continuously cut down. Acacia has a strong tendency to spread and produces chemical substances that suppress the growth of native plants, which are then replaced by nitrophilous species, such as the stinging nettle (Urtica dioica), which degrades the area. Another problematic species is Knotweed (Reynoutria). It spreads rapidly, displaces native species and acidifies the soil. It is removed several times a year using glyphosate herbicides.

In the caves, lampenflora is present in places with permanent lighting. It consists of algae and mosses, mainly Bryum capillary, Eucladium verticillatum, creeping feather moss (Amblystegium serpens), Brachythecium rutabulum, Brachythecium velutinum, Fissidens taxifolius, and Leptobryum pyriforme. Lampenflora is an undesirable phenomenon due to the damage it causes to secondary karst formations. Its occurrence is limited by specific management, such as by spraying sodium hypochlorite and by changing the lighting techniques.

=== Fauna ===
Due to all-year high temperatures, the caves aren't used by bats as an overwintering location. Nevertheless, there can occasionally be found lesser horseshoe bats (Rhinolophus hipposideros) - critically endangered C1 species, common pipistrelle (Pipistrellus pipistrellus) – highly endangered C2 species, the soprano pipistrelle (Pipistrellus pygmaeus) – highly endangered C2 species, and the serotine bat (Eptesicus serotinus) – highly endangered C2 species.

Other specially protected species that live in the area are the slowworm (Anguis fragilis), grass snake (Natrix natrix), sand lizard (Lacerta agilis), dormouse (Glis glis), sparrowhawk (Accipiter nisus), and the collared flycatcher (Ficedula albicollis). From the several groups of invertebrates that have been studied here, among the most interesting rank millipedes (Diplopoda), especially species Brachychaeteuma bradae and Geoglomeris subterranea, whose presence in the Czech Republic was first confirmed at this location.

Androniscus dentiger woodlouse are found in the cave system.

== Protection ==
Until 1991 the cave was managed by Homeland Regional Institute in Olomouc. Since 1991 the caves have been under the administration of Nature and Landscape Protection Agency of the Czech Republic and since 2006 also the Cave Administration of the Czech Republic, organizations of the Ministry of the Environment of the Czech Republic.

A big problem is damage done to the aragonite by organisms on textile fibers released from the clothing of passing visitors. The organisms cause discoloration of white aragonite needles and their subsequent decay, but there are possible solutions to address the issue. Other factors with negative impact on the karst decorations are: foreign substances released by breathing, physical breaking of the decorations, the release of dust, hair and textile fibers and the temperature increase caused by the body temperature of visitors. To limit these impacts, it is necessary for visitors to follow the tour's rules and for a limited number of visitors per group to be maintained. Additionally, algae and moss occasionally grow in places with permanent lighting near the visitor routes. These growths are removed twice a year using a solution of sodium hypochlorite.

== Tourism ==
The route available to the public is 375 m long (out of the 1322 m of known tunnels), and its tour lasts 50 minutes. 60,000 people visit the caves each year.

Cave tours begin in a space called the Assembly Hall, named after a distinct rock in the middle, which bears a resemblance to a speaker's desk. The route continues to another small nook called At Anthony, after a stone protrusion resembling a small figure. It is here the tour guide explains the origin of the caves' unique raft stalagmites. What follows is a completely unique area named the Doughnut Hall. The doughnut-shaped formations on the walls were formed by the deposition of layers of pure calcite mixed with iron oxides. The next stop that awaits visitors is the Gallaš Dome, named after the writer and Hranice native Josef Heřman Agapit Gallaš, who lived between 1756 and 1840. Around the Waterfall, a space with classic speleothem formations, the tour continues to the Baptistery, a narrow passageway with the highest amount of surface water drip. The next area, the Jurik Dome, features a wall covered with bushes of aragonite called the Curtain. Visitors pass by the Turkish Cemetery containing more raft stalagmites and through an artificially created hallway into the tour's final area, the Marble Hall, which is used for art expositions and music concerts.
