= Snezhanka (cave) =

Cave in Bulgaria

- Снежанка
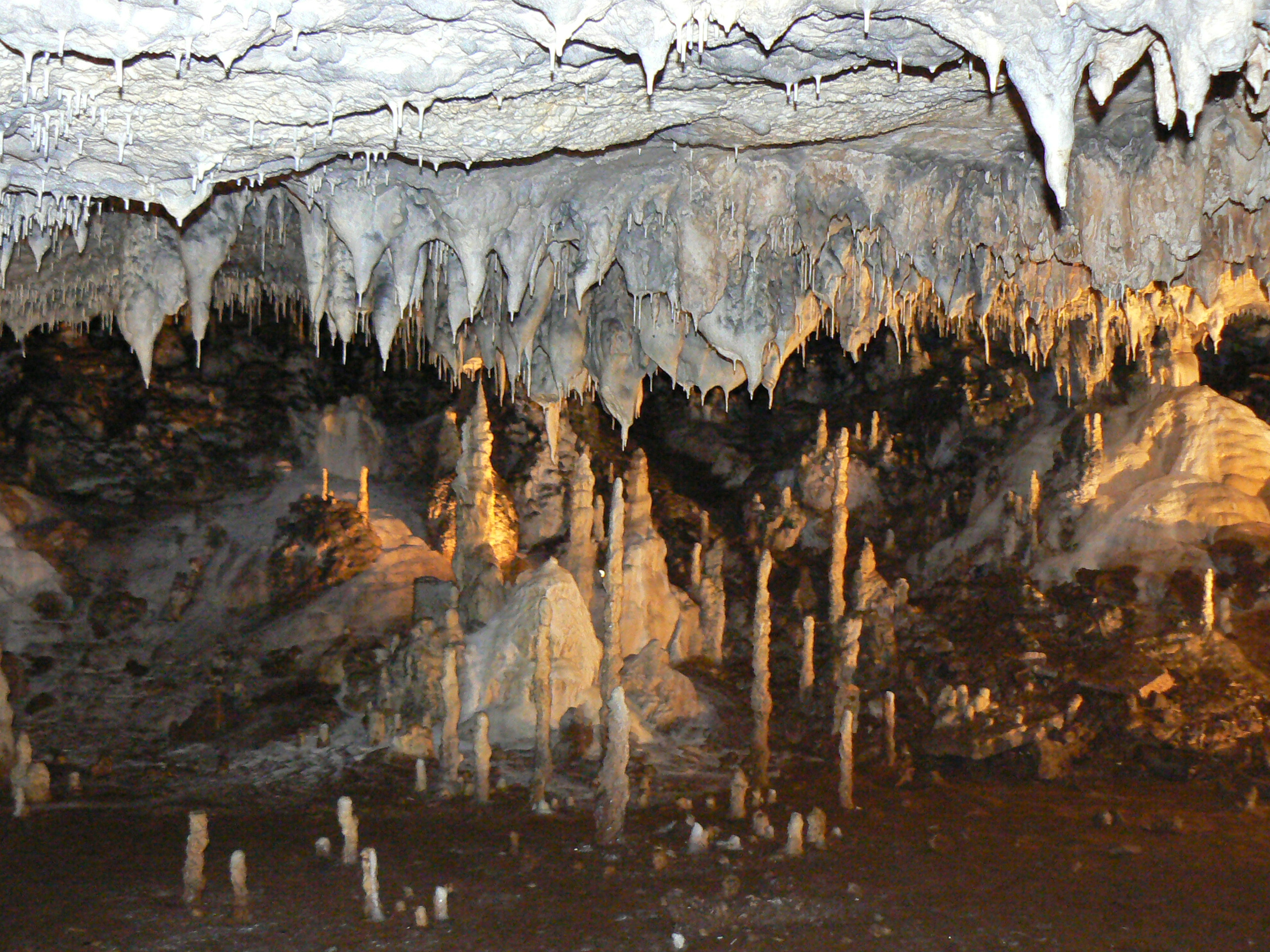
- A picturesque niche in the Cave
- Interactive map of Snezhanka
- Location: Rhodope Mountains, Bulgaria
- Coordinates: 42°0′12″N 24°16′13″E
- Length: 145 m
- Discovery: 1961

Snezhanka (Bulgarian: Снежанка, "Snow White") is a show cave in the Rhodope Mountains, southern Bulgaria. It was discovered in 1961 and opened for visitors in 1965. Snezhanka is among the 100 Tourist Sites of Bulgaria of the Bulgarian Tourist Union.

== Location ==
Snezhanka cave is situated in the Batak Mountain of the western Rhodope Mountains in the valley of the river Novomahlenska, a tributary of the Stara reka. The cave is located 5 km southwest of the town of Peshtera, Pazardzhik Province. It is accessible from the second class II-37 road between Peshtera and Batak, from where a 2 km narrow asphalt road leads to a parking. From there a 830 m foot trail leads to the cave's entrance.

== Geology and description ==
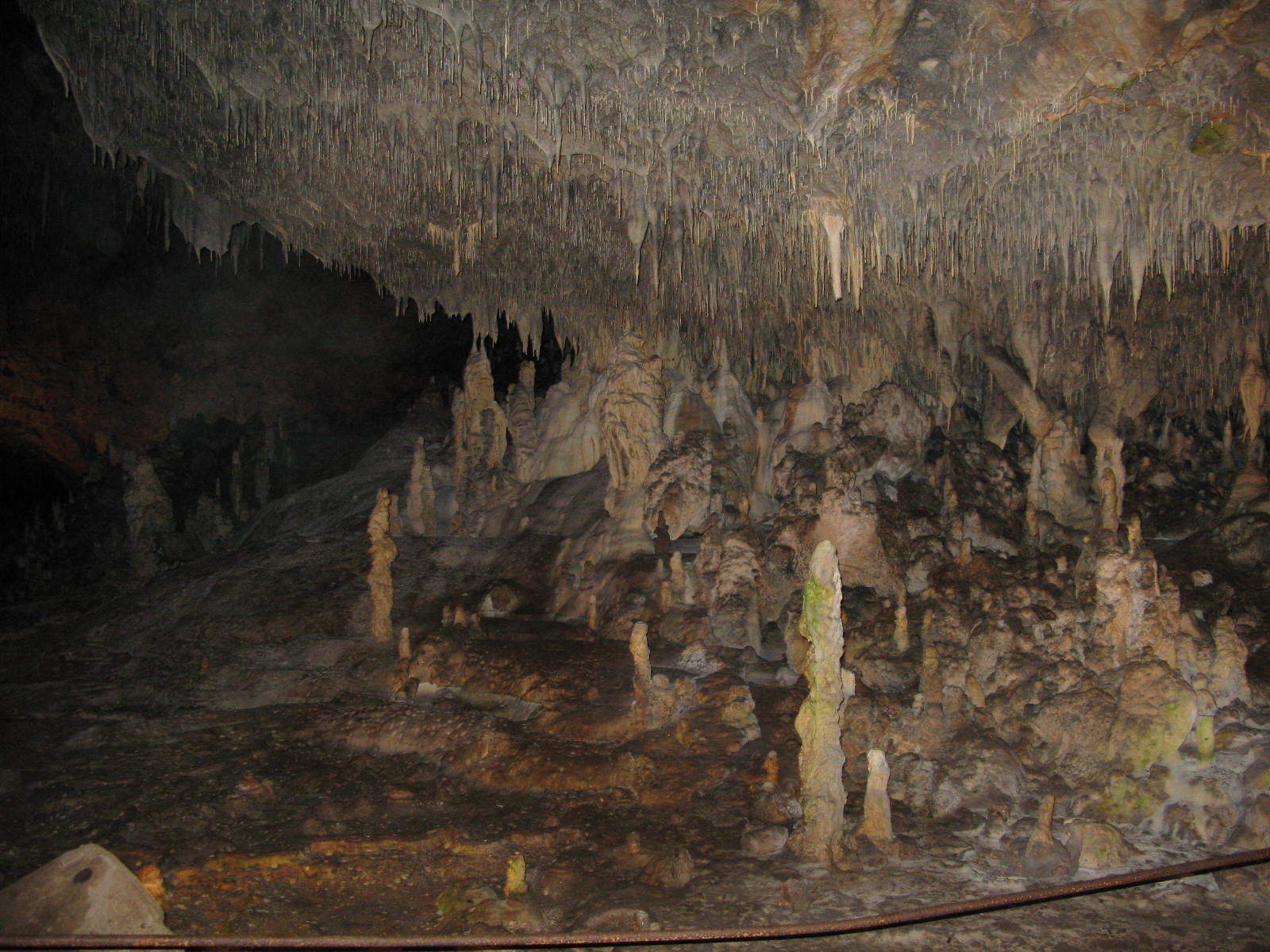
Snezhanka cave

The total length of the cave is 368 m long, with its main gallery reaching 145 m. Its area is 3,150 m^{2} Inside there is constant annual temperature of 8 °C. The cave was formed 3.5 million years ago by the river Novomahlenska.

Despite its small size, the cave is rich in stalactites, stalagmites, draperies and sinter lakes. It consists of several halls: Udders Hall, The Large Hall, The Music Hall, linked by the Toppling over which a metal bridge runs. In the Wonderful Hall, built by snow-white crystal sinter, nature has shaped a figure, often likened to the fairy-tale character Snow White, after which the cave was named.

In the middle of the cave there are circular hearths, where animal bones and artifacts dating back to early Iron Age were discovered. The ancient Thracians may have used the cave as a refuge from their enemies.

== Fauna ==
Snezhanka is an important wintering site for several bat species, including greater mouse-eared bat (Myotis myotis), Geoffroy's bat (Myotis emarginatus), greater horseshoe bat (Rhinolophus ferrumequinum), lesser horseshoe bat (Rhinolophus hipposideros) and Mediterranean horseshoe bat (Rhinolophus еuryale).
