= Hato Caves =

Marine coral limestone caves on the island of Curaçao

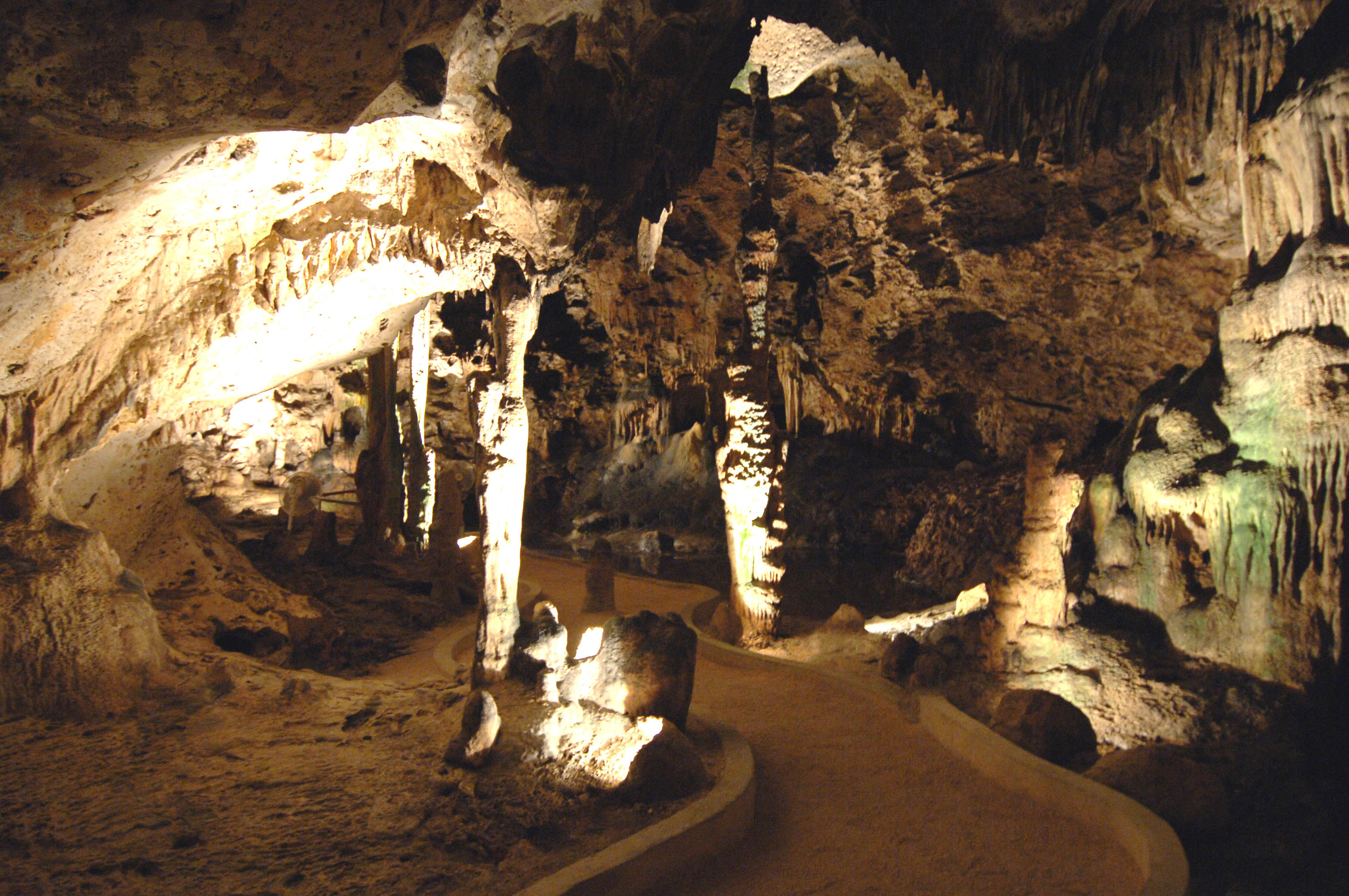
- The caves in 2006

- location in Curaçao Hato Caves (the Caribbean)
- 12°10′47.28″N 68°56′54.24″W
- Periods: 1,500 years ago
- Associated with: Arawaks
- Location: Hato, Roosevelt Weg
- Region: Curaçao, Caribbean

Hato Caves are show caves, publicly accessible since 1991 and a popular tourist attraction on the Caribbean island of Curaçao. The caves consist of marine coral limestone, which accumulated over millions of years and after sea levels had dropped were exposed to atmospheric corrosion and karstic processes. They are approximately 240 m (790 ft) long and cover an area of 4,900 m^{2} (53,000 sq ft) .

== Location ==
The site is situated on the island's northern coast, north of the town of Willemstad on the Roosevelt Weg. The caves constitute layers and terraces. Several caves are to be found on the second terrace, the Hato Caves are exclusively located above on the third terrace.

== History ==
The earliest known inhabitants of the caves about 1,500 years ago were the Amerindian Arawaks and Caiquetio Indians, who also buried their dead in the caves. The numerous petroglyphs and cave drawings are attributed to these early occupants. Before the abolition of slavery, runaway slaves used the caves as hiding places.

== See also ==
- List of caves
- Caribbean people
- History of Curaçao
