= Teplice nad Bečvou =

- Municipality
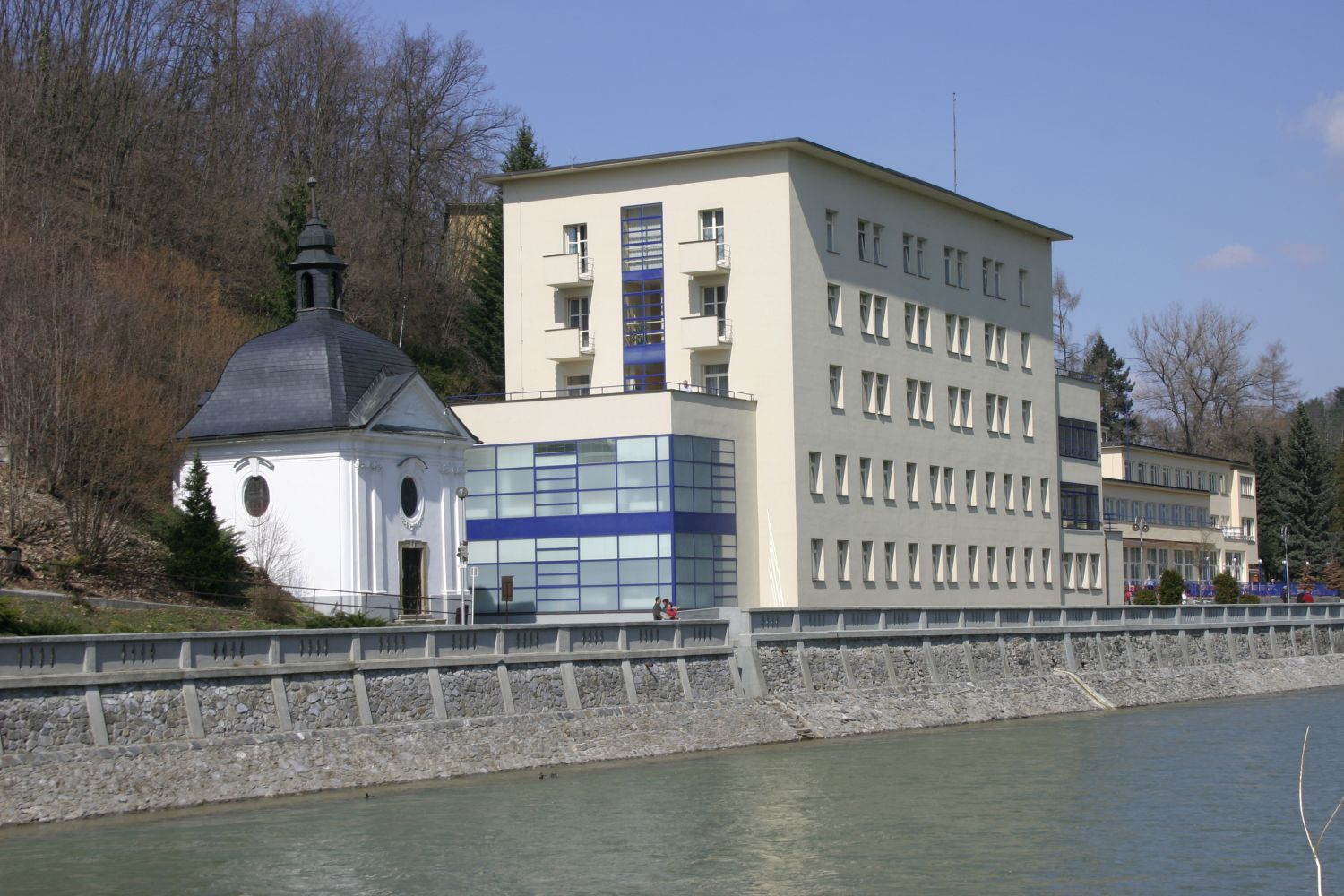
- Spa building and hotel

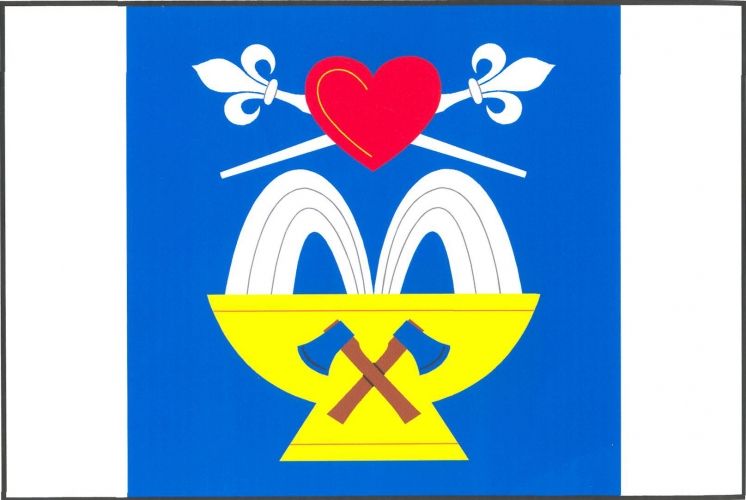
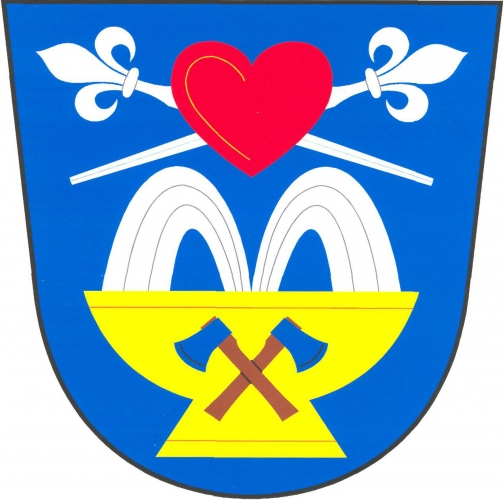
- Flag Coat of arms

- Location in the Czech Republic
- Coordinates: 49°31′43″N 17°44′24″E
- Country: Czech Republic
- Region: Olomouc
- District: Přerov
- First mentioned: 1328

Area
  - Total: 3.76 km^{2} (1.45 sq mi)
- Elevation: 333 m (1,093 ft)

Population (2026-01-01)
  - Total: 454
  - Density: 121/km^{2} (313/sq mi)
- Time zone: UTC+1 (CET)
  - Summer (DST): UTC+2 (CEST)
- Postal code: 753 01
- Website: www.teplicenb.cz

Teplice nad Bečvou (until 1959 Zbrašov) is a spa municipality and village in Přerov District in the Olomouc Region of the Czech Republic. It has about 500 inhabitants. In addition to the spa, the municipality is known for the Zbrašov Aragonite Caves.

== Geography ==
Teplice nad Bečvou is located about 22 kilometres (14 mi) northeast of Přerov and 34 km (21 mi) east of Olomouc. It lies in the Moravian-Silesian Foothills. It is situated on the left bank of the Bečva River.

== History ==
The first written mention of Teplice nad Bečvou under its old name Zbrašov is from 1328. One half of the village belonged to the Helfštýn estate and later to the Hranice estate, and one half was owned by the Hradisko Monastery. In 1491, Vilém II of Pernštejn bought Zbrašov from Hradisko Monastery and annexed it to his Hranice estate.

Zbrašov was then held by Václav Haugwitz of Biskupice (in 1547–1553) and by Jan Kropáč Sr. of Nevědomí (1553–1571). In 1553, Jan Kropáč of Nevědomí had the most abundant thermal springs brought to one place and thus laid the foundations of the local spa. After the Battle of White Mountain, Zbrašov was acquired by Franz von Dietrichstein. The Dietrichstein family owned the estate until 1923.

== Demographics ==
Historical population

Year	Pop.	±%
1869	232	—
1880	214	−7.8%
1890	202	−5.6%
1900	219	+8.4%
1910	220	+0.5%

Year	Pop.	±%
1921	239	+8.6%
1930	287	+20.1%
1950	543	+89.2%
1961	346	−36.3%
1970	316	−8.7%

Year	Pop.	±%
1980	368	+16.5%
1991	325	−11.7%
2001	307	−5.5%
2011	376	+22.5%
2021	412	+9.6%

Source: Censuses

== Spa ==
The municipality is known as a spa resort that specializes in cardio-rehabilitation for clients with the emphasis on prevention of heart attacks and strokes. A unique medicinal mean are baths in the alkali earthy acidulous water with a high content of carbon dioxide.

== Transport ==
There are no railways or major roads passing through the municipality.

== Sights ==
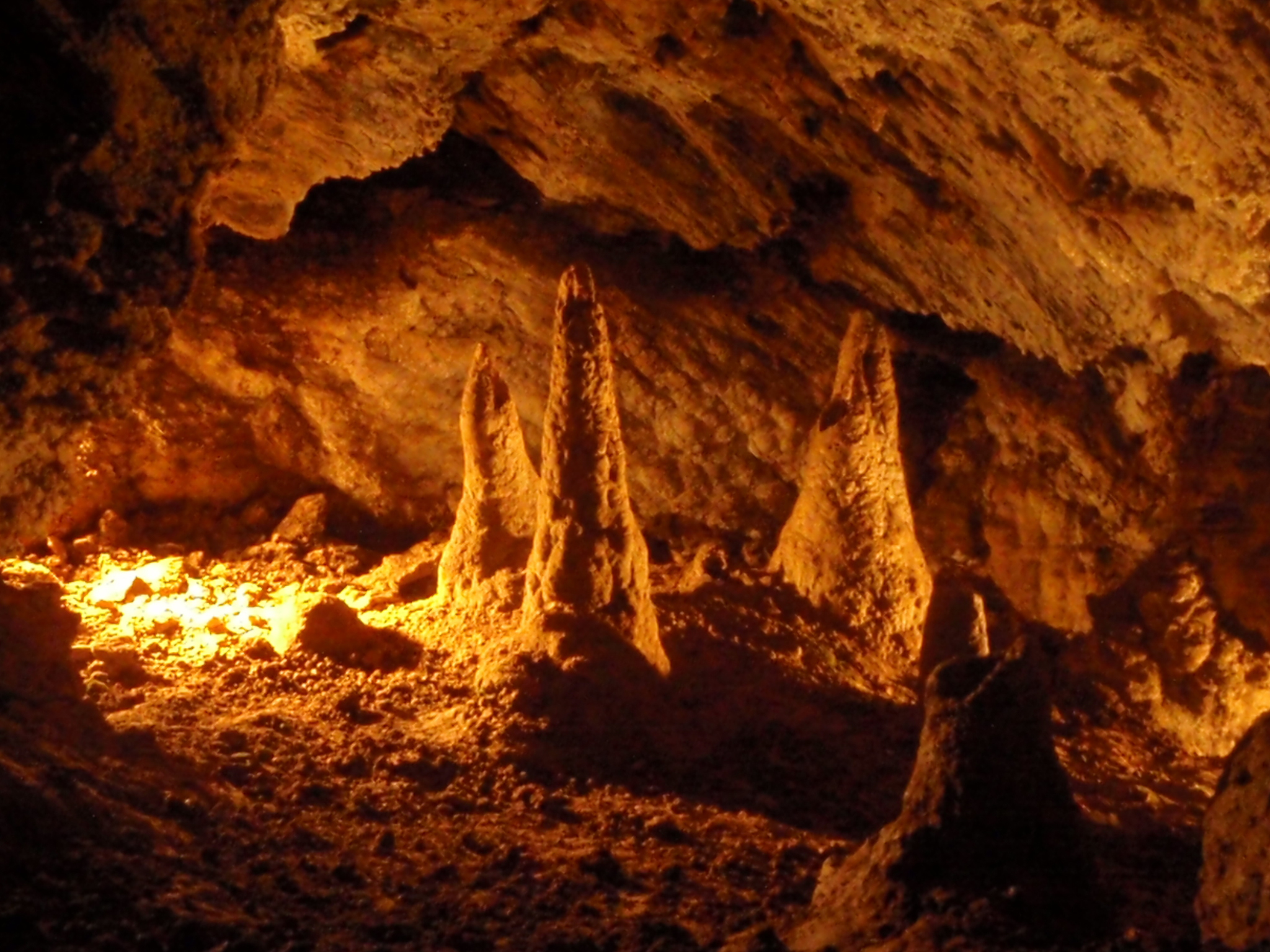
Geysers of hot acidulous water created stalagmites

The most valuable historical monument is the Chapel of Saint Peregrine. It was built in the Baroque style in 1775.

The main landmark of the spa colonnade is the Bečva spa house. Built in 1931–1932, it is a valuable example of the Functionalist style.

Among the main tourist destinations of Teplice nad Bečvou are the Zbrašov Aragonite Caves. The cave system was discovered in 1912 and open to the public in 1926. The caves contain aragonite, raft stalagmites and sinter spheric coating, reminding of doughnuts.

== Notable people ==
- Olina Hátlová-Tylová (born 1943), luger
- Miroslav Janota (born 1948), wrestler
- Petr Matoušek (born 1949), cyclist
- Jaromír Vlk (born 1949), athlete
- Petr Kůrka (born 1960), sports shooter
- Dušan Masár (born 1962), wrestler
- Radka Štusáková (born 1972), judoka

== Twin towns – sister cities ==
Teplice nad Bečvou is twinned with:

- Šmarješke Toplice, Slovenia
