= Gyovren =

Gyovren Гьоврен
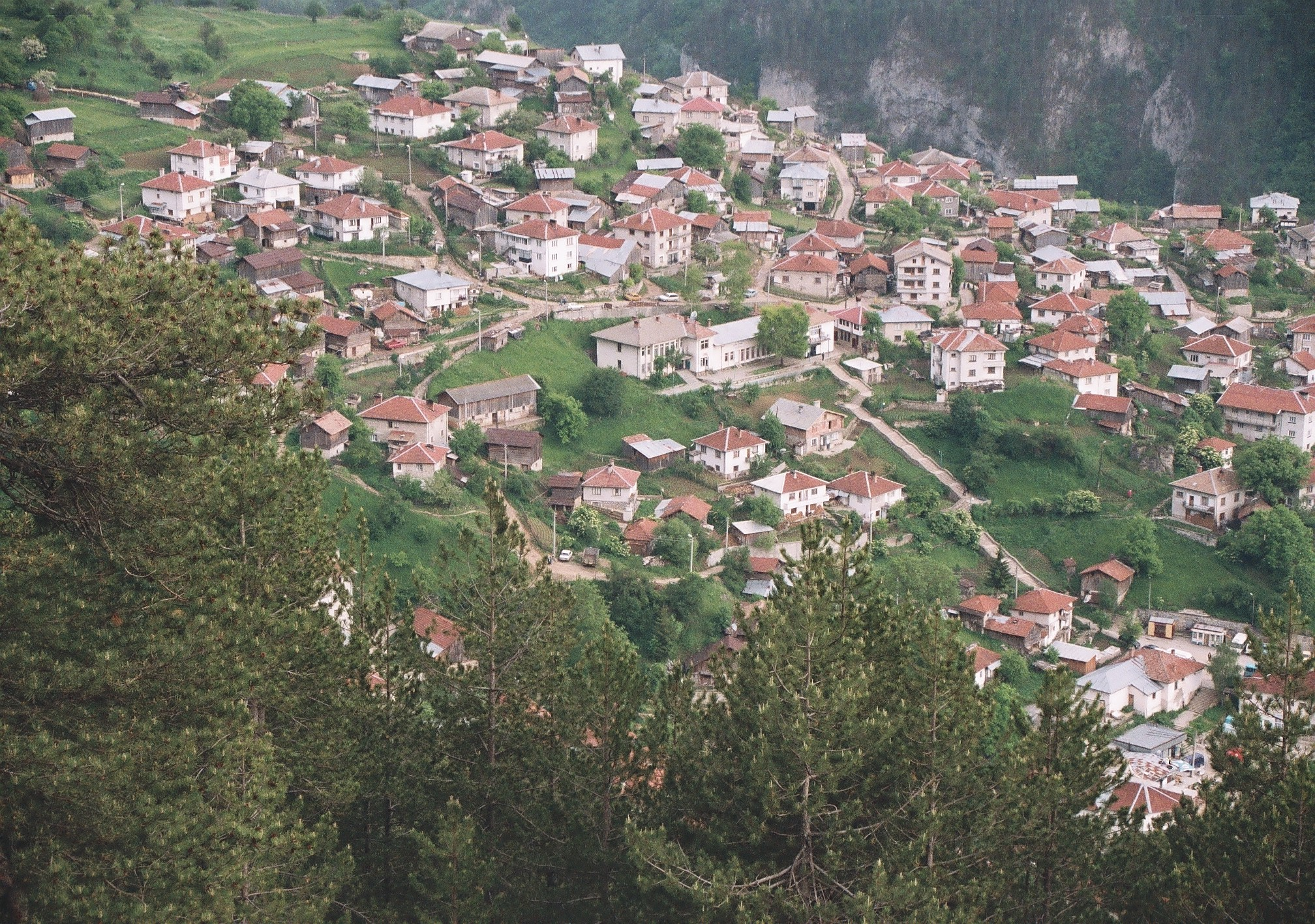
- Gyovren

- Location of Gyovren
- Coordinates: 41°39′46″N 24°22′34″E
- Country: Bulgaria
- Provinces (Oblast): Smolyan

Government
  - Mayor: Shukri Saidov
- Elevation: 1,386 m (4,547 ft)

Population (2008)
  - Total: 897
- Time zone: UTC+2 (EET)
  - Summer (DST): UTC+3 (EEST)
- Postal Code: 4811
- Area code: 030416

Gyovren (Bulgarian: Гьоврен; Turkish: Gövren) is a village under the municipality of Devin in the Smolyan Province in the southern part of Bulgaria.

== Geography ==
Gyovren is located in the Rhodope Mountains on the northern slope of the Trigrad plateau, not far from the Bulgaria–Greece border. It is located 20 km south of the town of Devin between the villages of Teshel and Trigrad and 143 km from the national capital Sofia. It is a typical high-mountain village situated on a steep rocky relief. West of the village flows the Trigrad River and there lies the Trigrad Gorge. Along the road at the foot of the village is a mosque which was historically significant in the founding of the village.

== Culture ==
The village celebrates many old traditions and holidays such as Ramazan Bayrami, Kurban Bayram, Ashure and Aderlez.

== Attractions ==
The mountains surrounding Gyovren are full of rich natural wildlife. The natural reserve, "Kazanite", is home to pine and spruce trees from over 80–100 years ago. Local wildlife in the reserve include deer, wild goats, and wild pigs. There are also a few dairy farms, "mandras," in the mountains where sheep milk, white cheese ("sirene"), kashkaval, and butter are processed manually during the summer months using centuries-old techniques.

Gyovren is also located between the Devil's Throat Cave and Yagodinska Cave.

There are also a number of guest houses located in the village and open for tourists throughout the year.

== Gallery ==
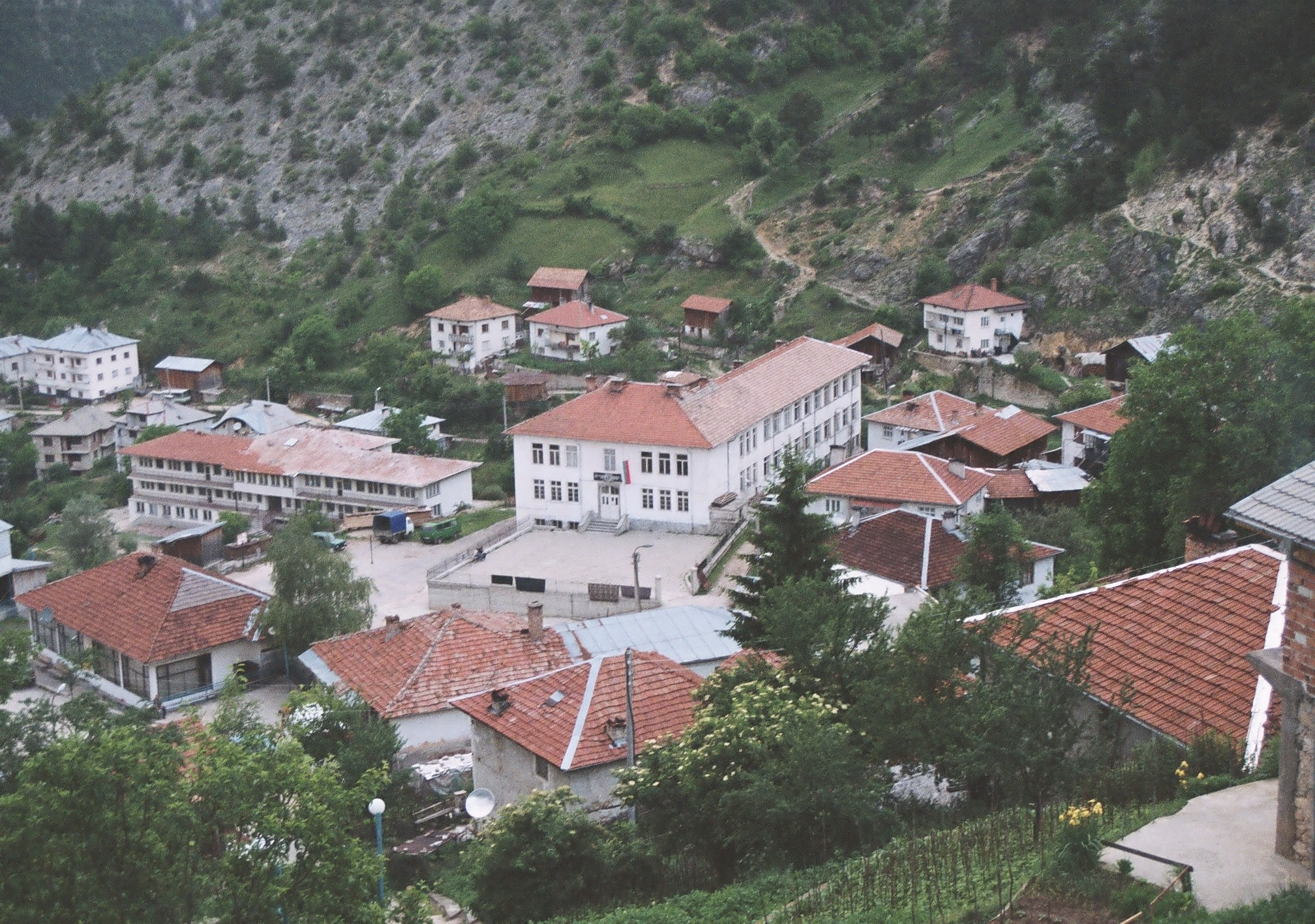
School in Gyovren

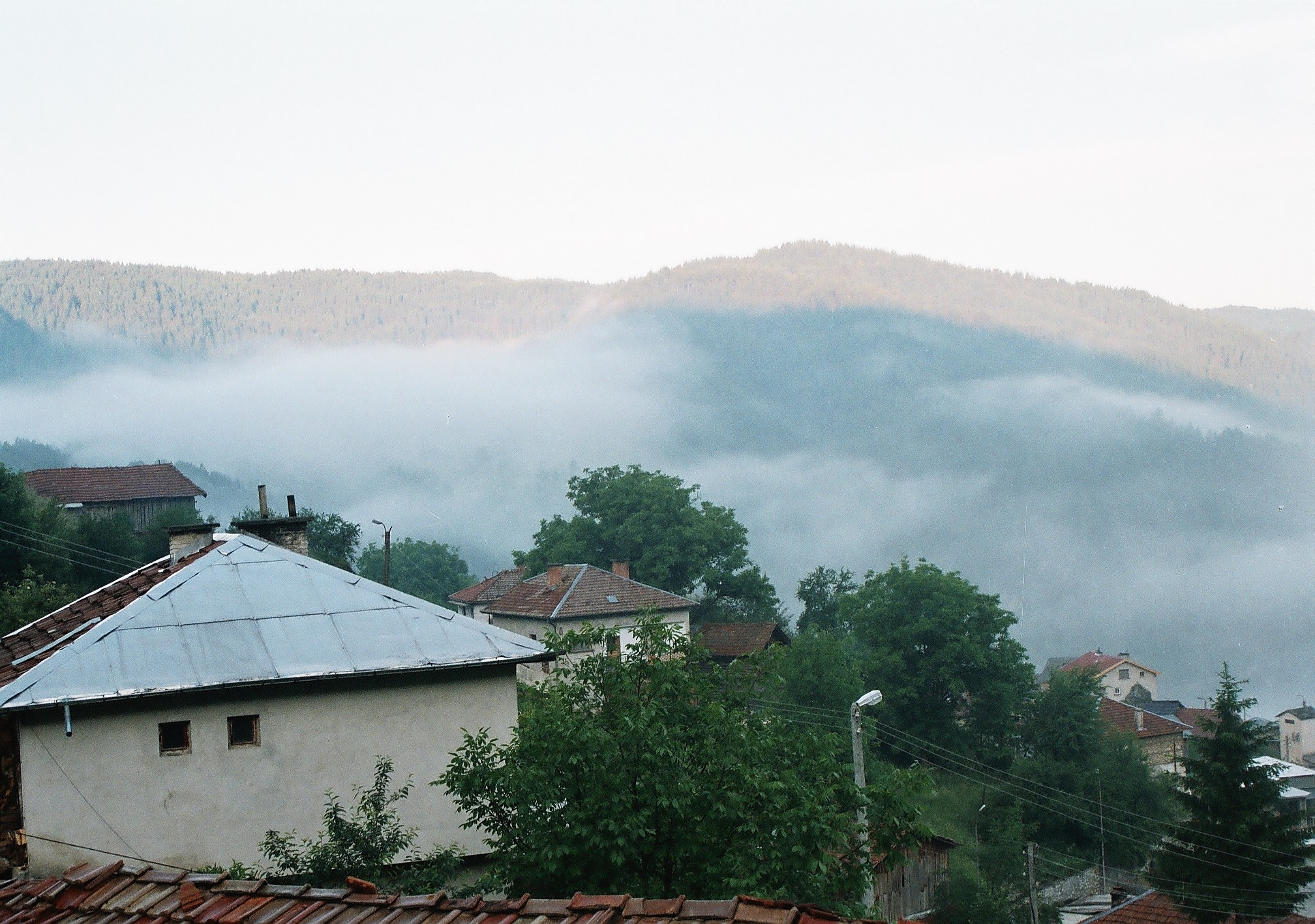

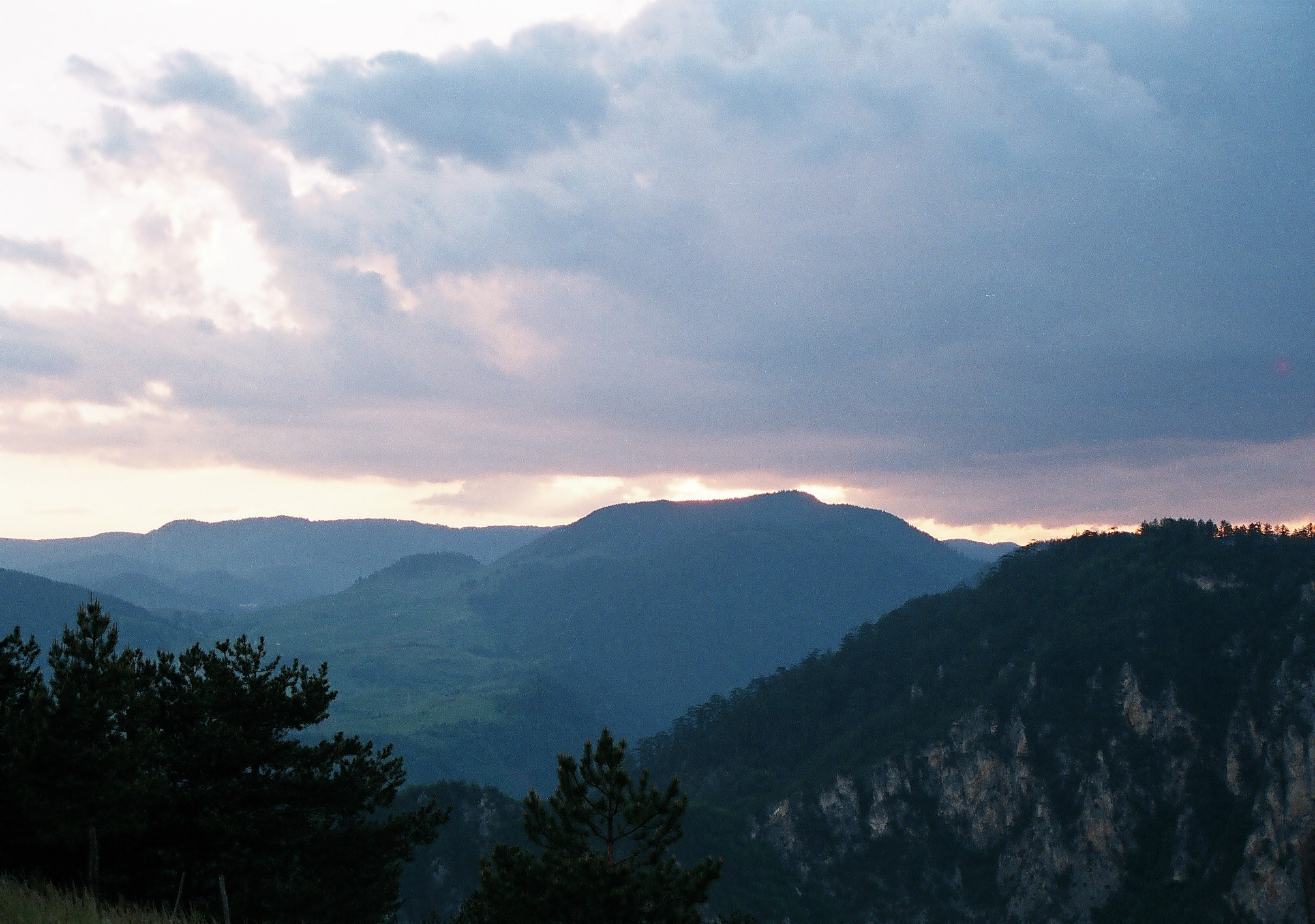

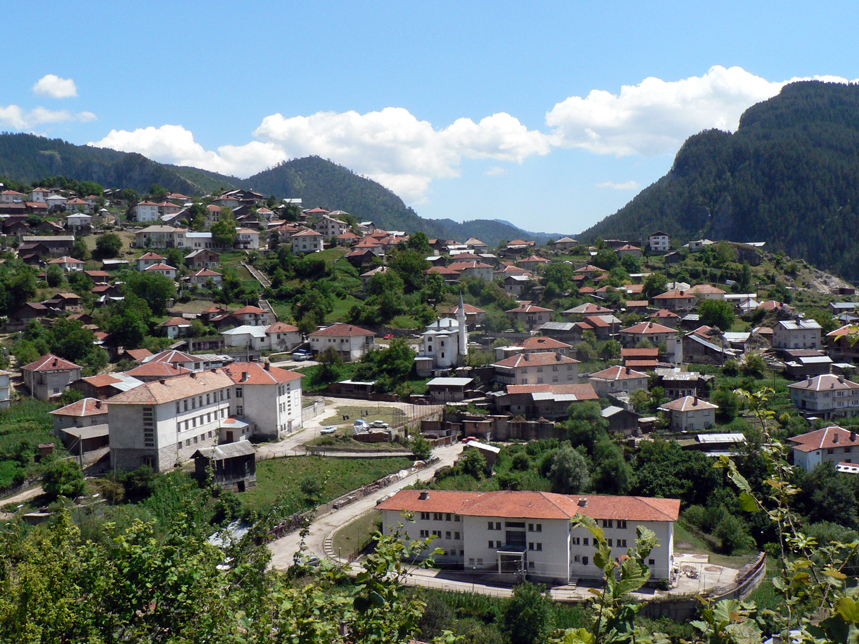
