= 100 Tourist Sites of Bulgaria =

Movement to promote tourism in Bulgaria

100 Tourist Sites of Bulgaria is a Bulgarian national movement established in 1966 to promote tourism among Bulgaria's most significant cultural, historic, and natural landmarks.

As part of this program, sites of cultural and historical significance have been selected, ranging from historic places and monuments to archaeological and architectural sanctuaries, museums, monasteries, as well as national parks, mountain peaks and other geological phenomena. Each of the chosen landmarks has its own individual seal, which is stamped onto pages of an official passport-like booklet issued by the Bulgarian Tourist Union (BTU). A booklet can be purchased at any tourist union center or on location at any of the sites and it costs a symbolic 1 lev. The booklet comes with a separate map which includes a list of the sites, their addresses and working hours. The maximum number of collectible stamps per booklet is 100 and, contrary to the movement's title, the exact number of official sites exceeds the number 100.

== Rewarding ==
A reward scheme has been developed to encourage collection of as many stamps as possible. Depending on the number of stamps collected, participants may receive bronze, silver or gold badges. 25 stamps earn bronze, 50 stamps earn silver and 100 stamps (a complete booklet) earn gold. The National Organizational Committee of the BTU holds an annual lottery for the previous year's badge earners every August. Prizes include domestic and overseas excursions, bicycles, tents, sleeping bags, and other travel-related items.

Some landmarks in the original program highlighted Bulgaria's Communist government, which collapsed on November 10, 1989. In 2003 the BTU removed many of these sites from the official list. Both the original and current lists appear below. The list has since seen minor changes in 2007, 2008 and 2009.

== Program Participants ==
A variety of organizations and institutions participated in developing and promoting the 100 Tourist Sites of Bulgaria. These include:

- The Bulgarian Tourist Union
- The Ministry of Education and Science of Bulgaria
- The Ministry of Culture of Bulgaria
- The Bulgarian State Agency for Youth and Sports
- The Holy Synod of the Bulgarian Orthodox Church
- The Ministry of Environment and Water of Bulgaria
- The Union of Bulgarian Motorists
- The Bulgarian Red Cross
- The Bulgarian National Radio
- Bulgarian National Television

== One hundred national tourist sites ==
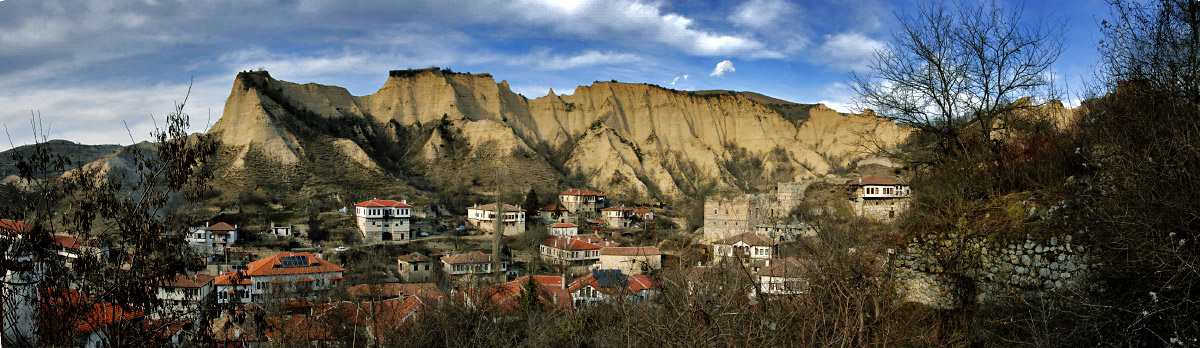
4. A view of Melnik and its sand pyramids

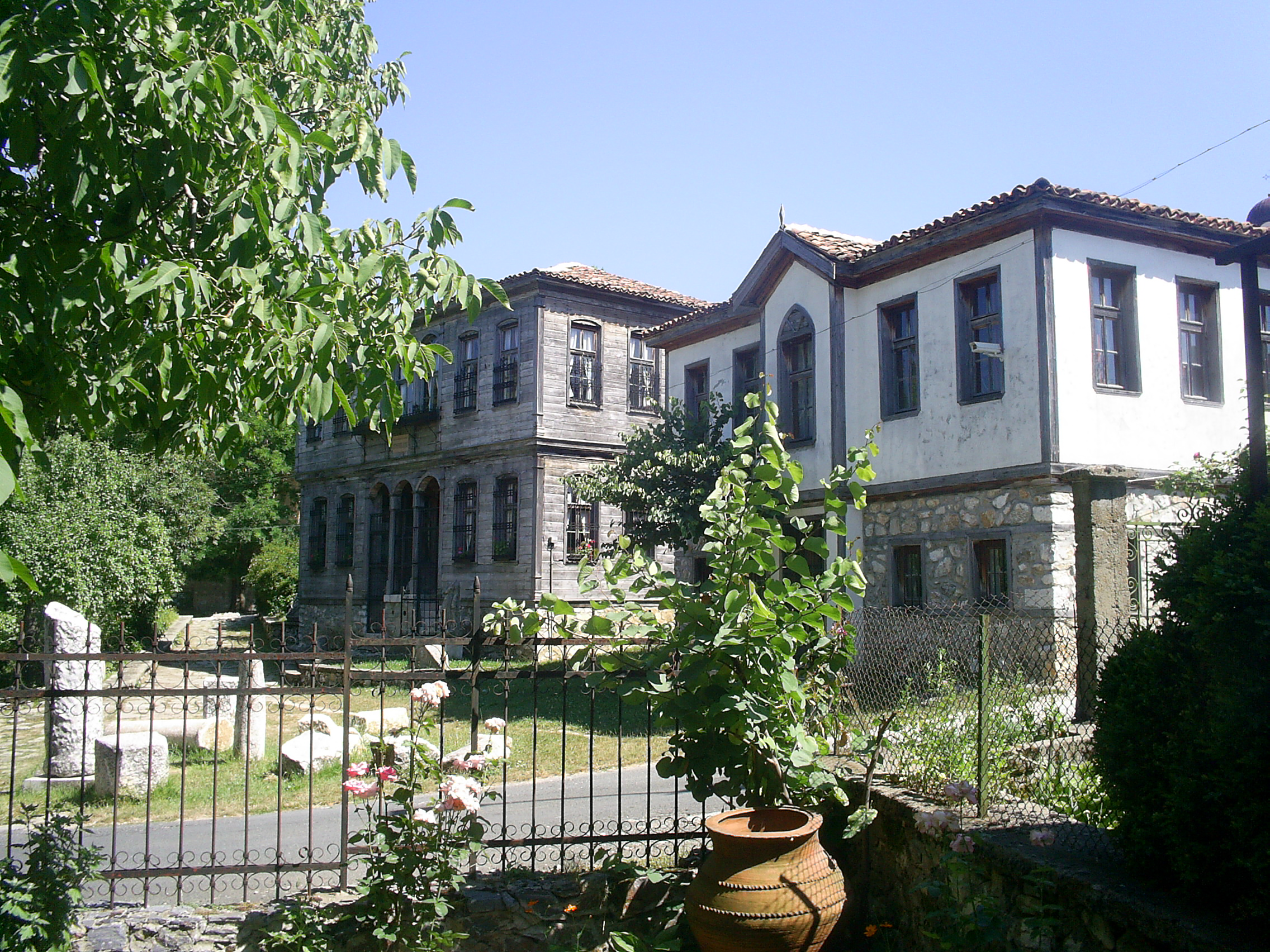
6. Malko Tarnovo – centre of the Ilinden-Preobrazhenie Uprising – Museum of History

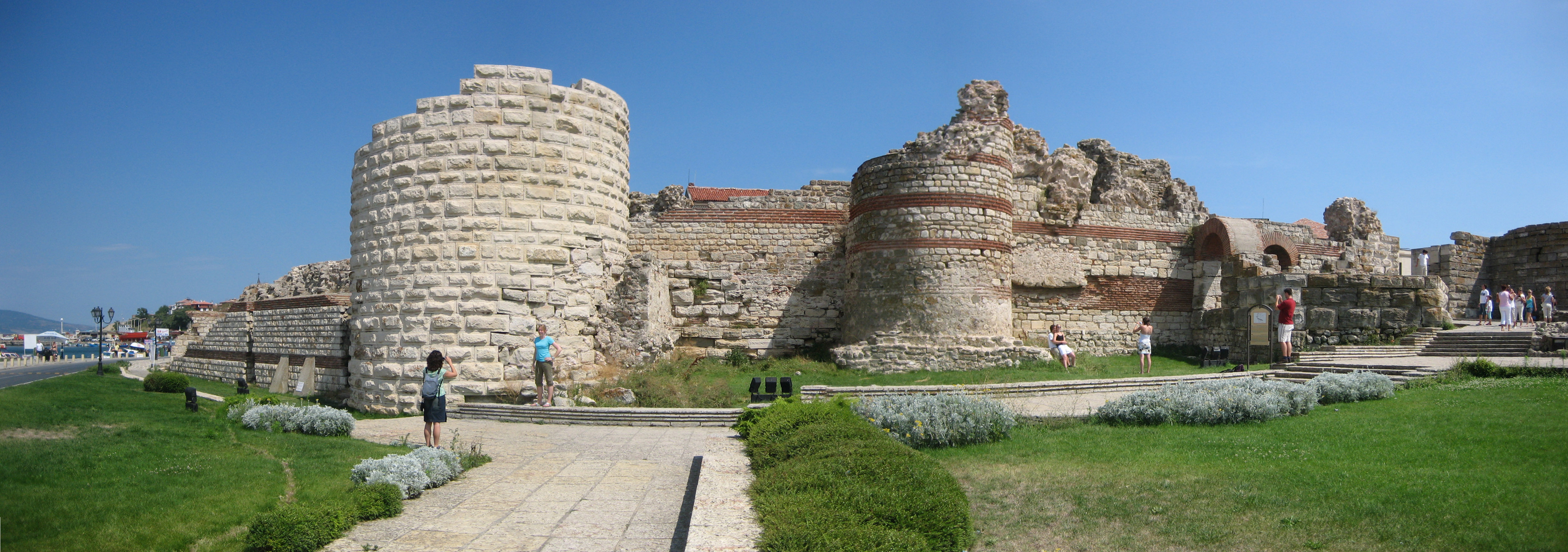
7. The fortifications at the entrance of Nesebar

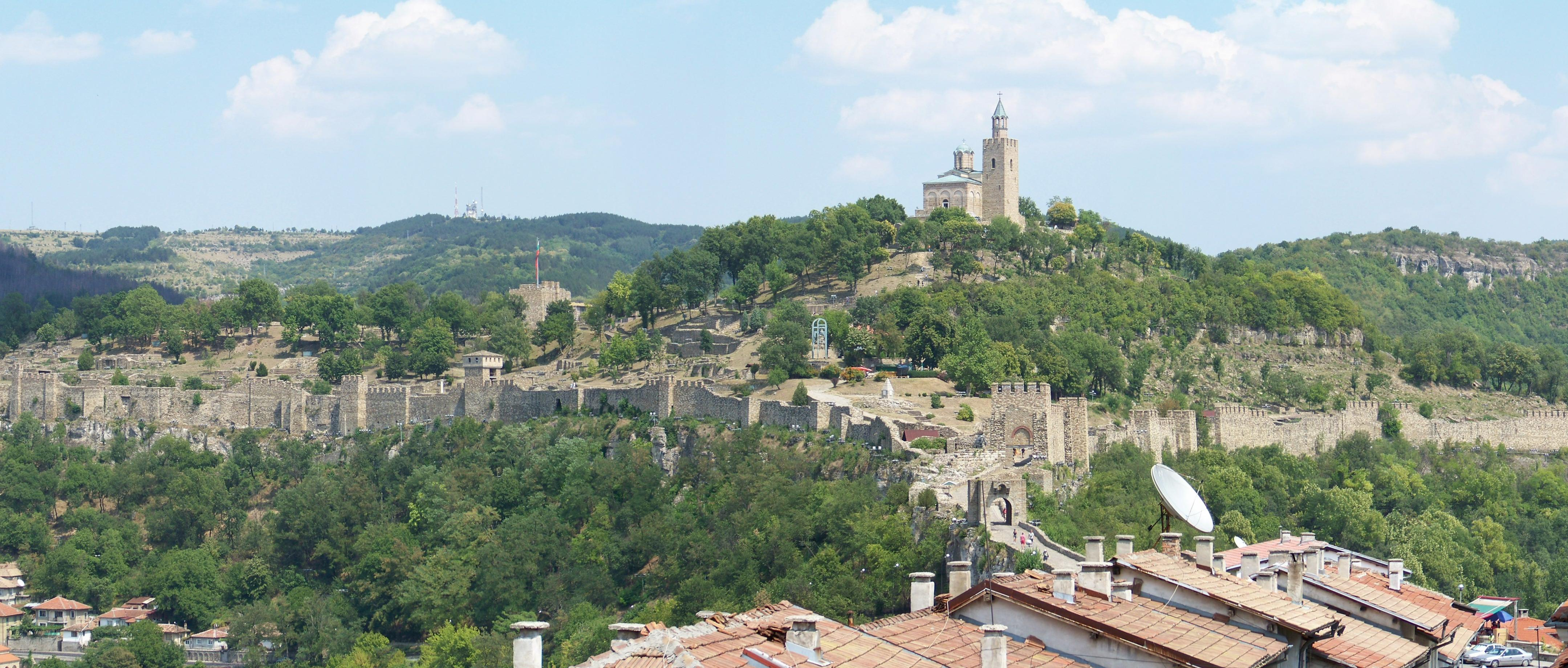
11. Veliko Tarnovo, capital of the Second Bulgarian Empire between 1185 and 1393

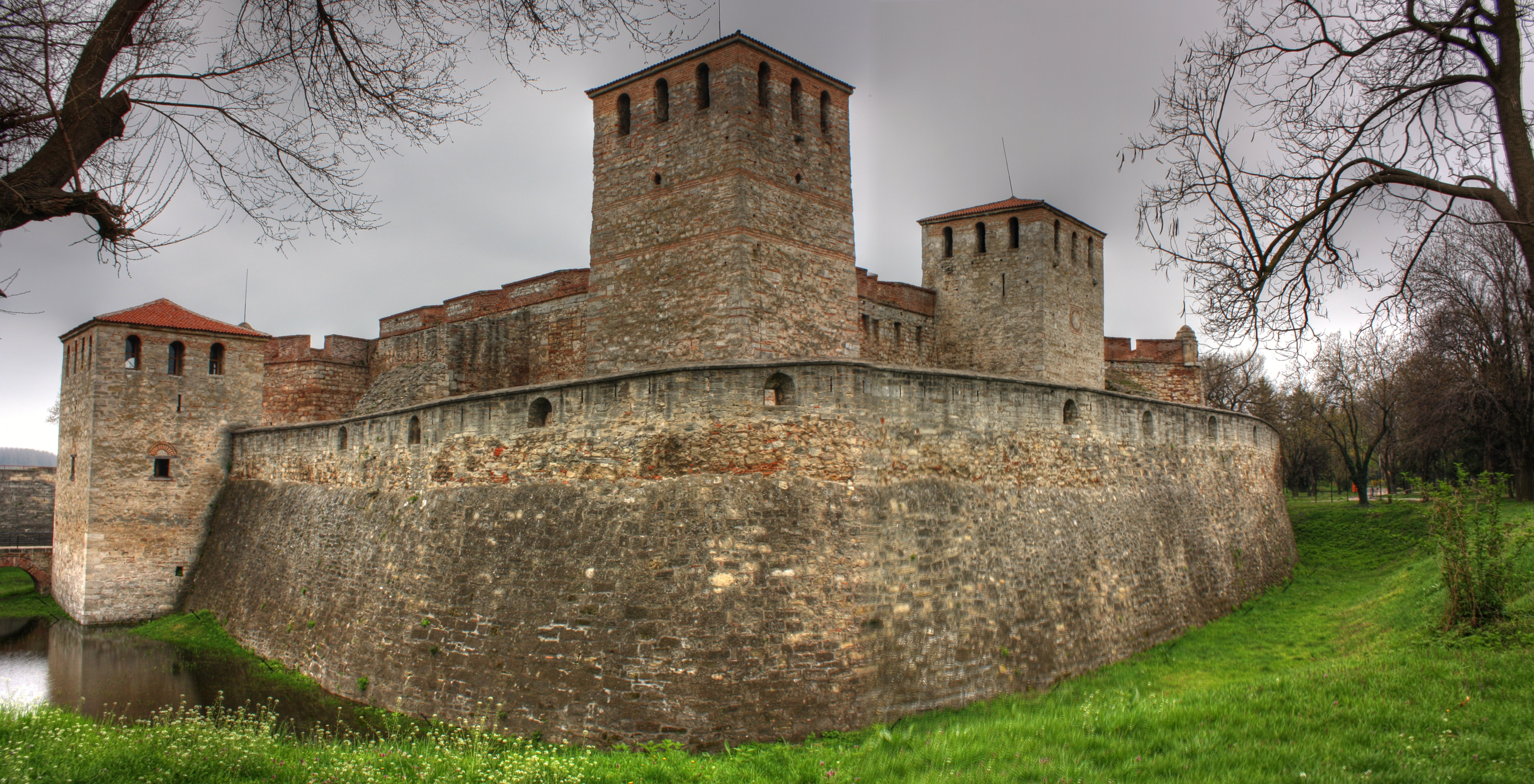
13. The medieval Bulgarian fortress of Baba Vida in Vidin

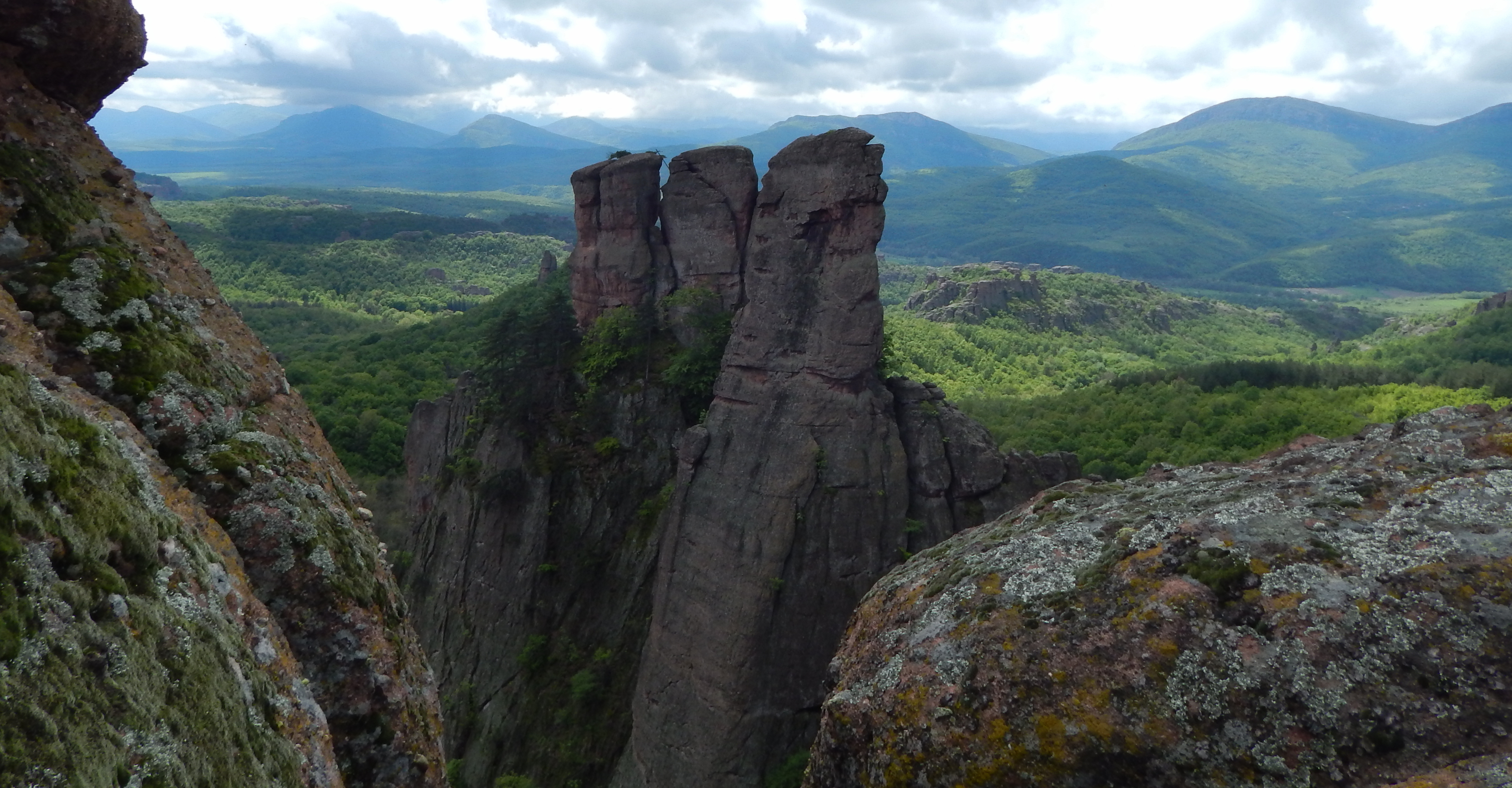
15. Belogradchik Rocks

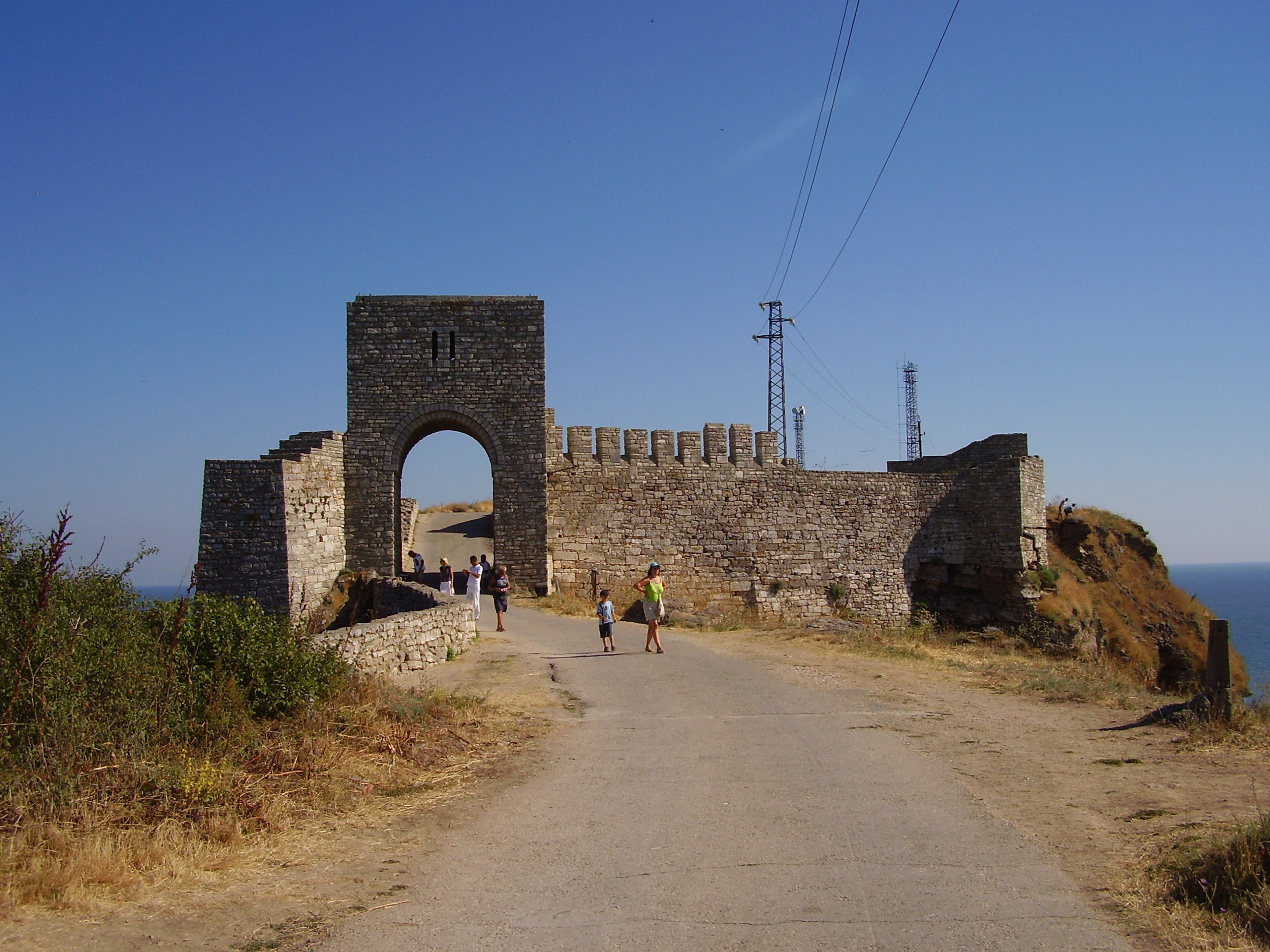
24. The medieval fortress on Kaliakra headland

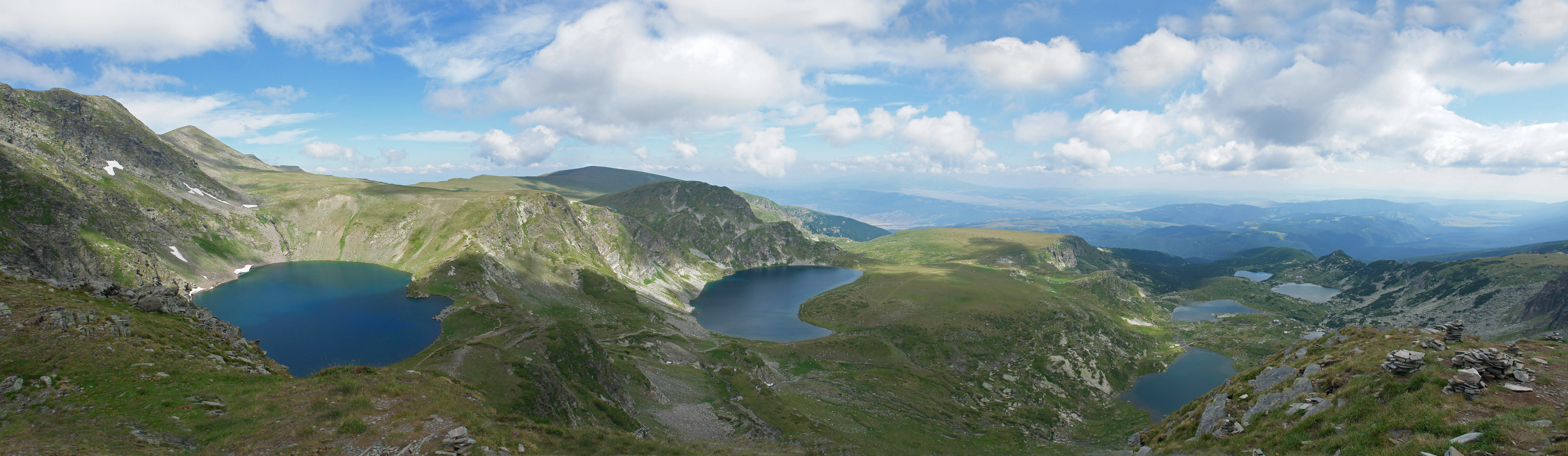
29. Seven Rila Lakes in the Rila mountains

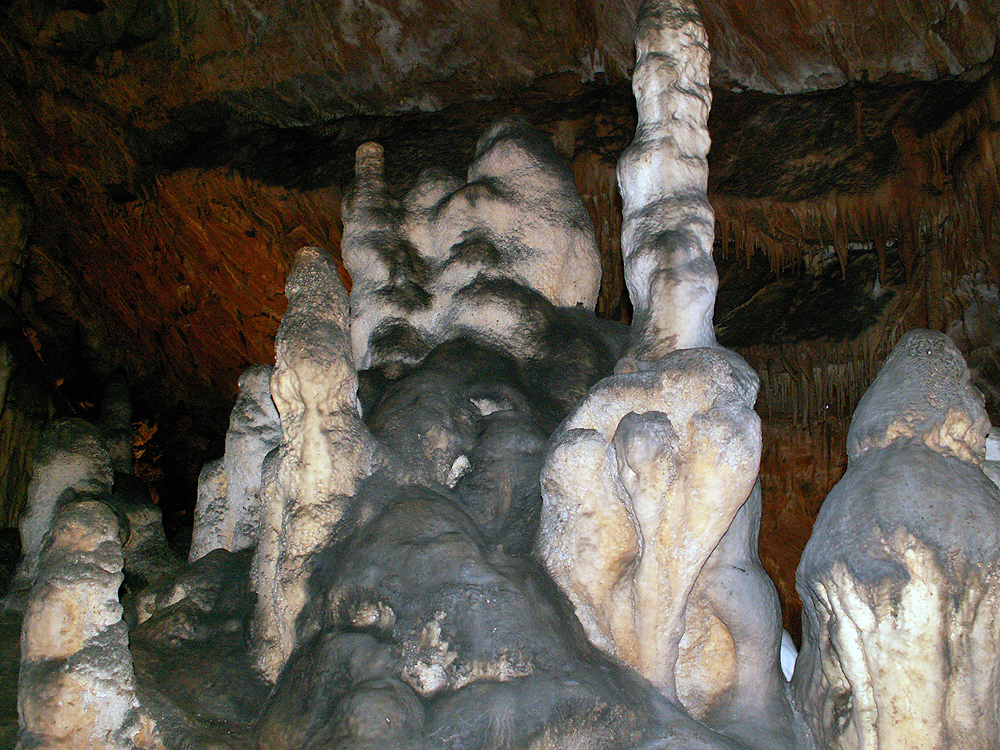
33. Saeva Dupka Cave in the Balkan Mountains

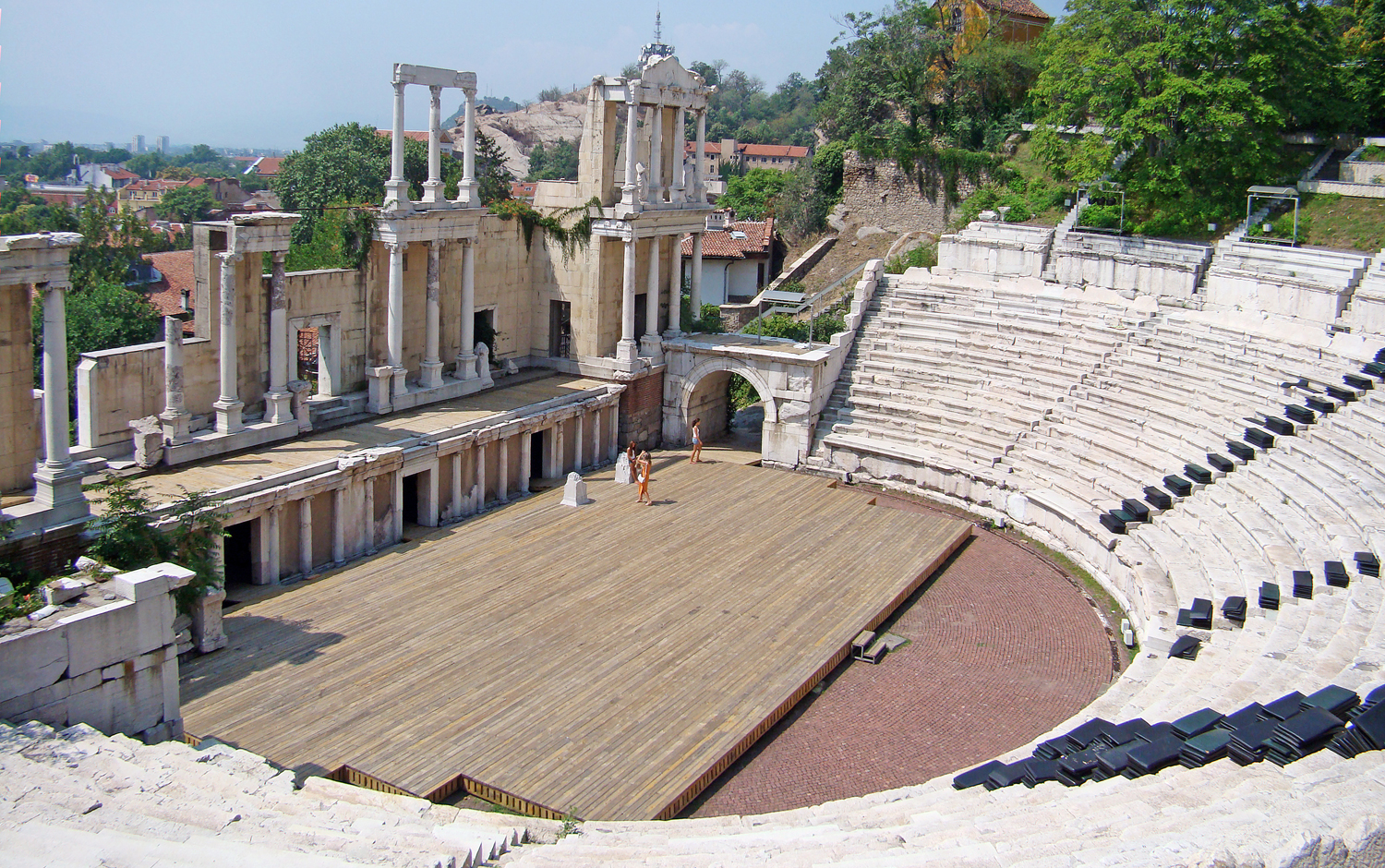
41. Plovdiv Roman theatre

45. Hristo Botev's house in Kalofer

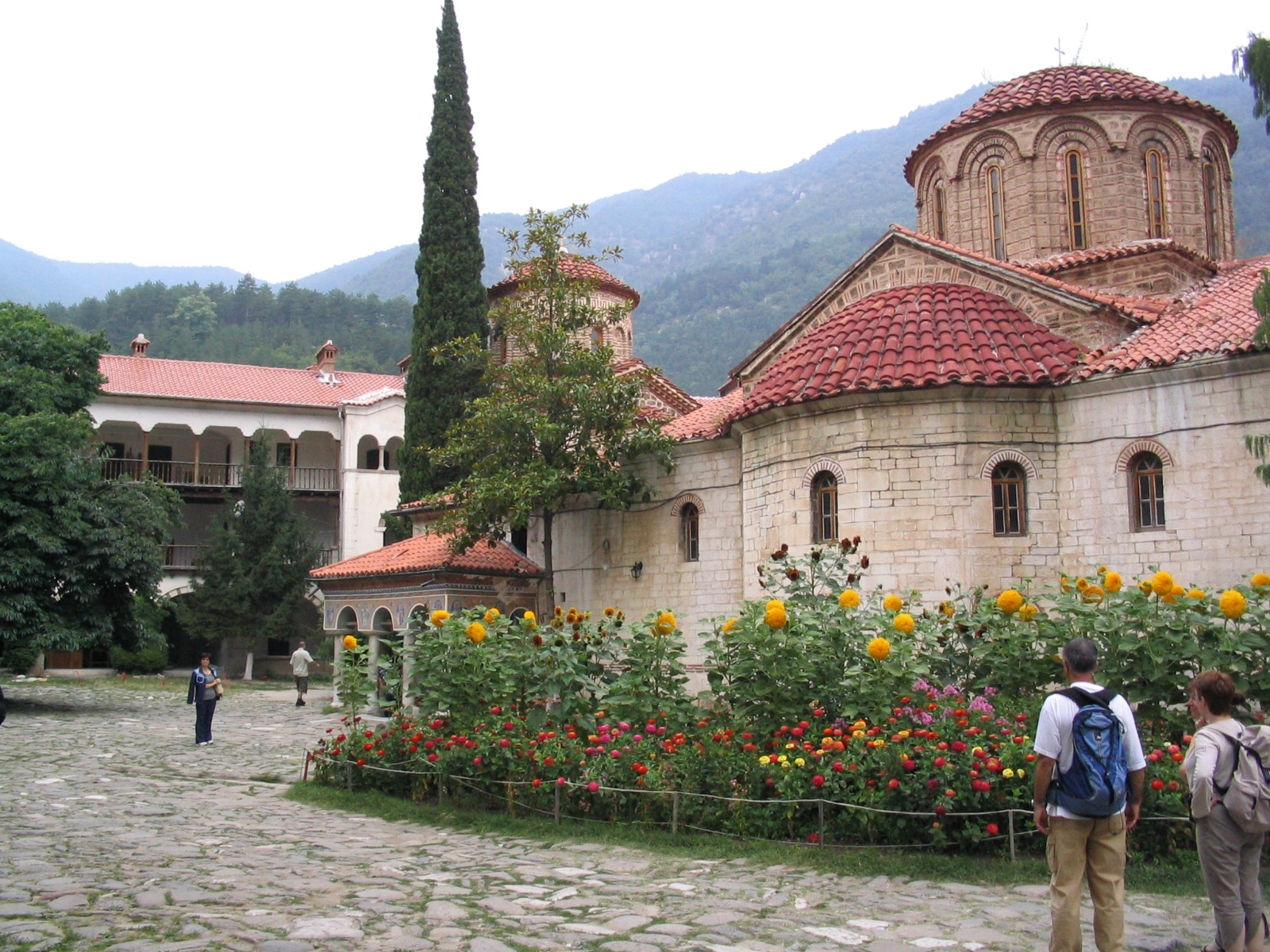
47. The Bachkovo Monastery

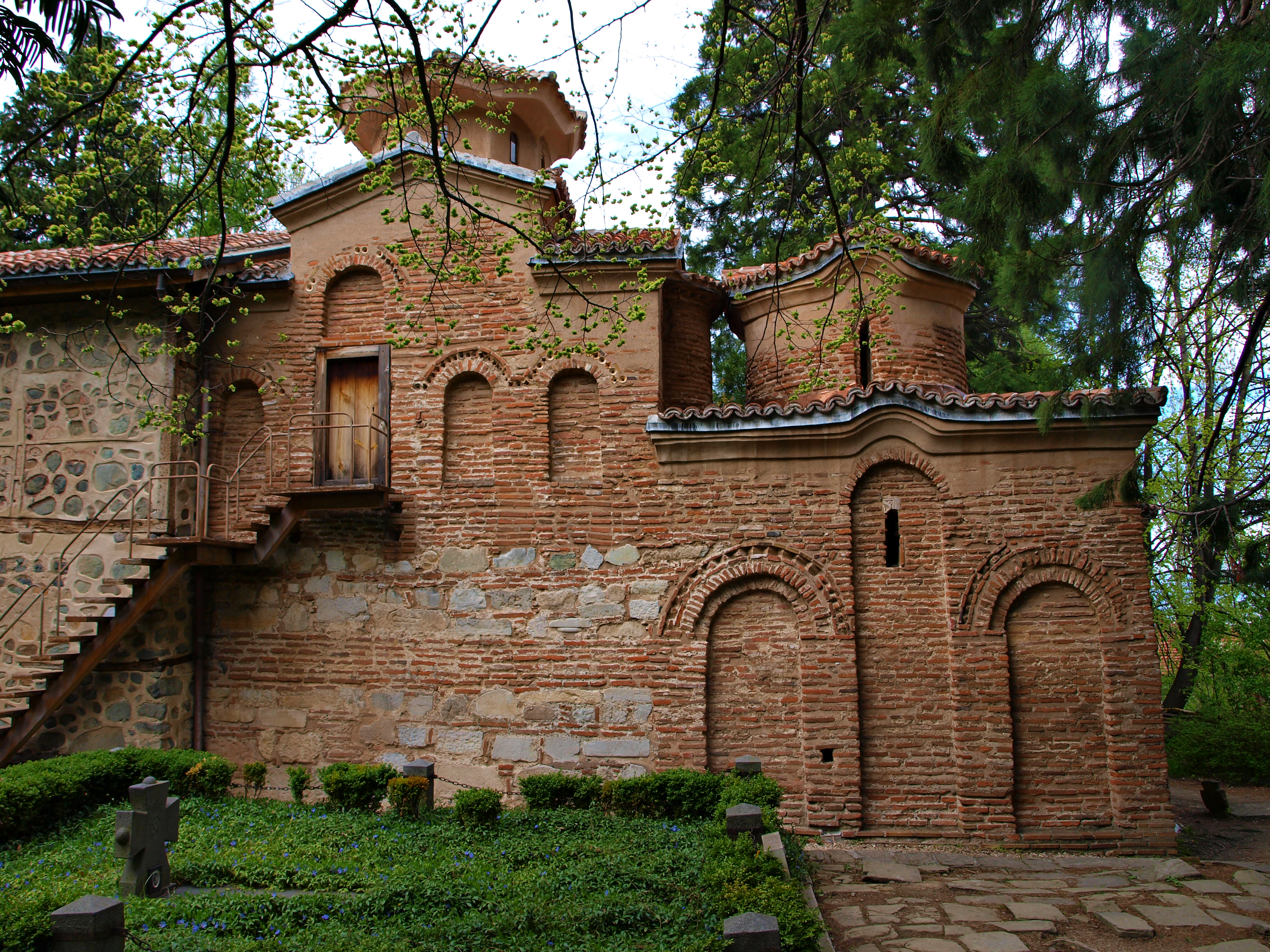
58. Boyana Church

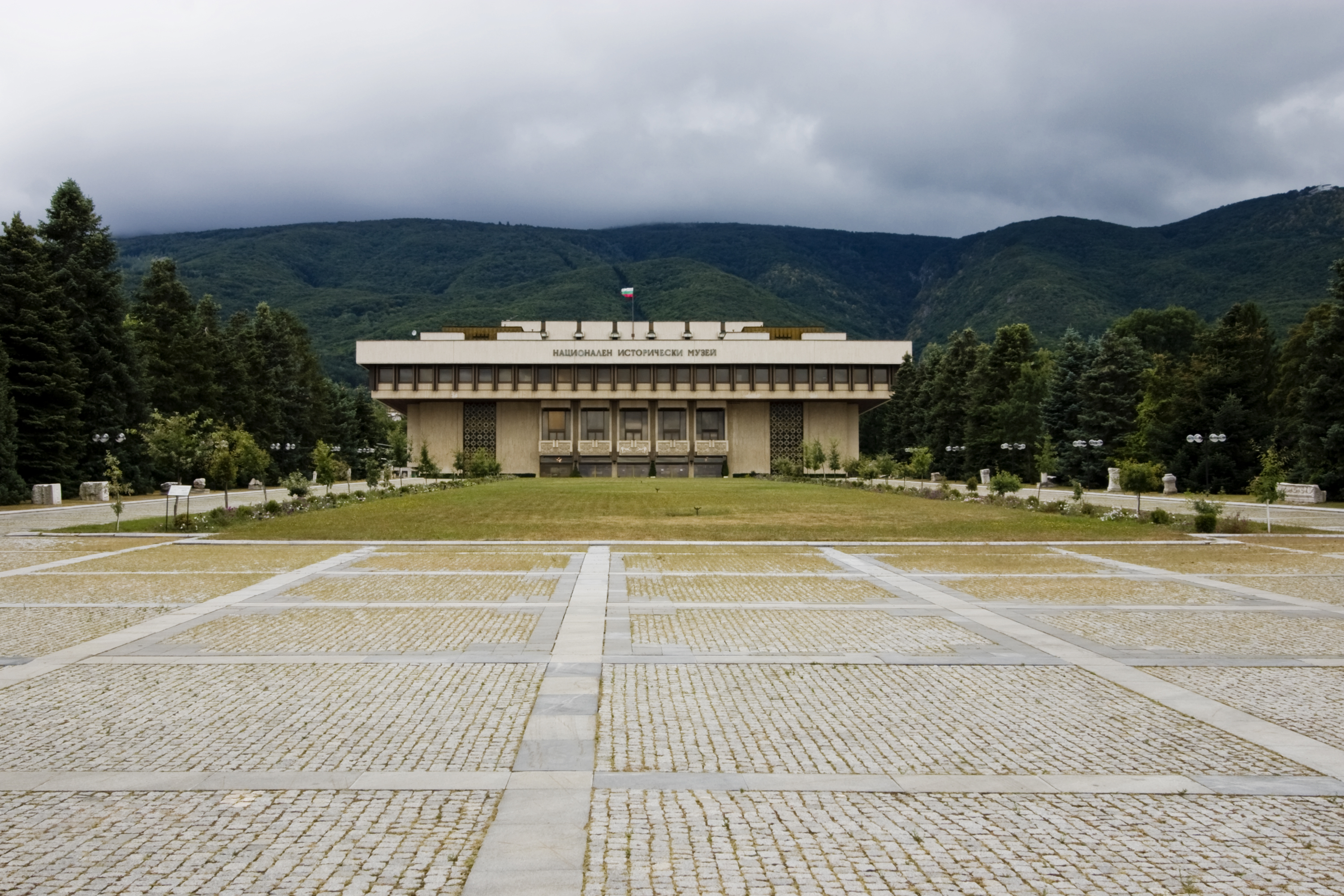
58. National Museum of History

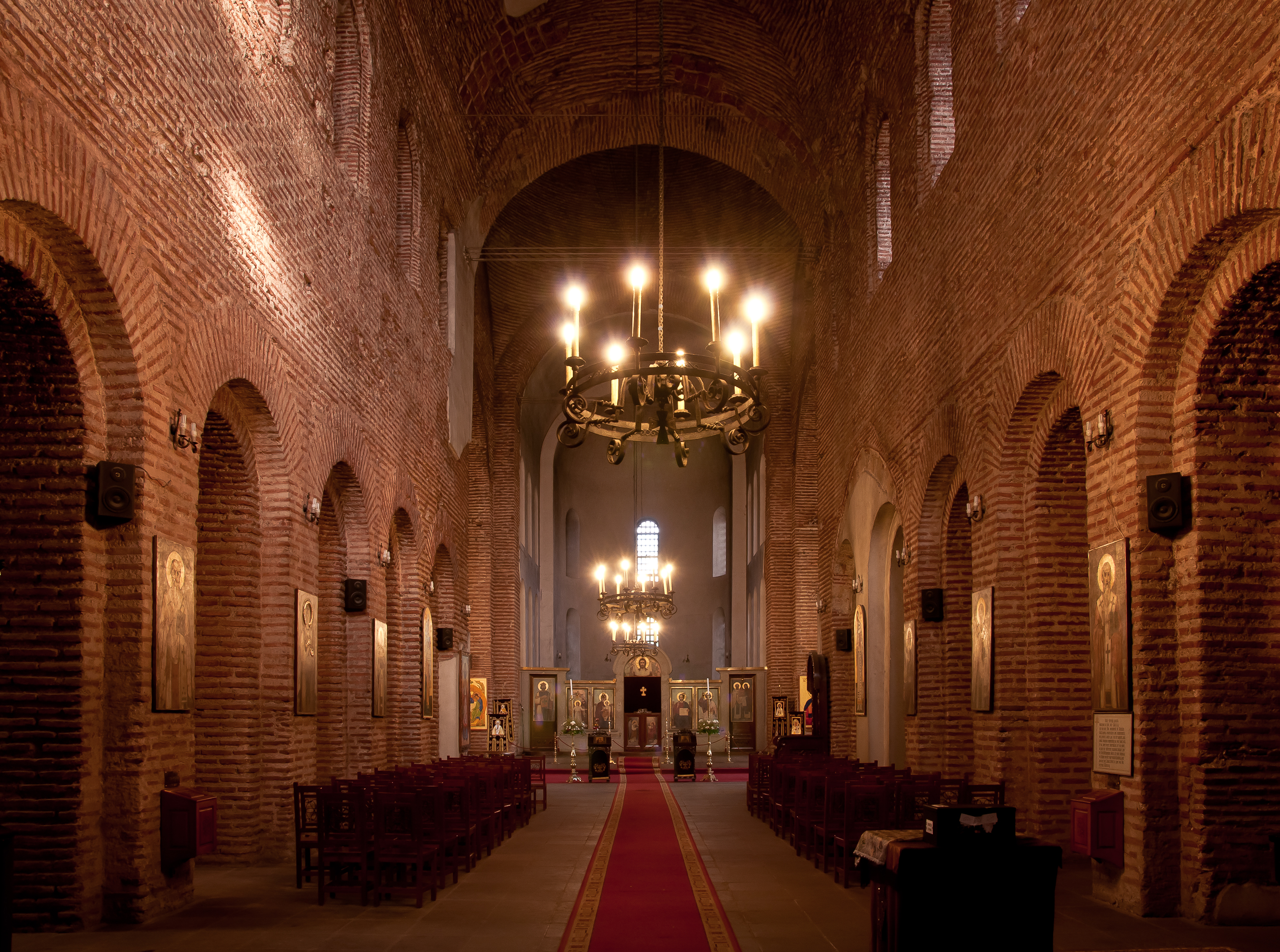
71. The 6th century Saint Sofia Church in Sofia

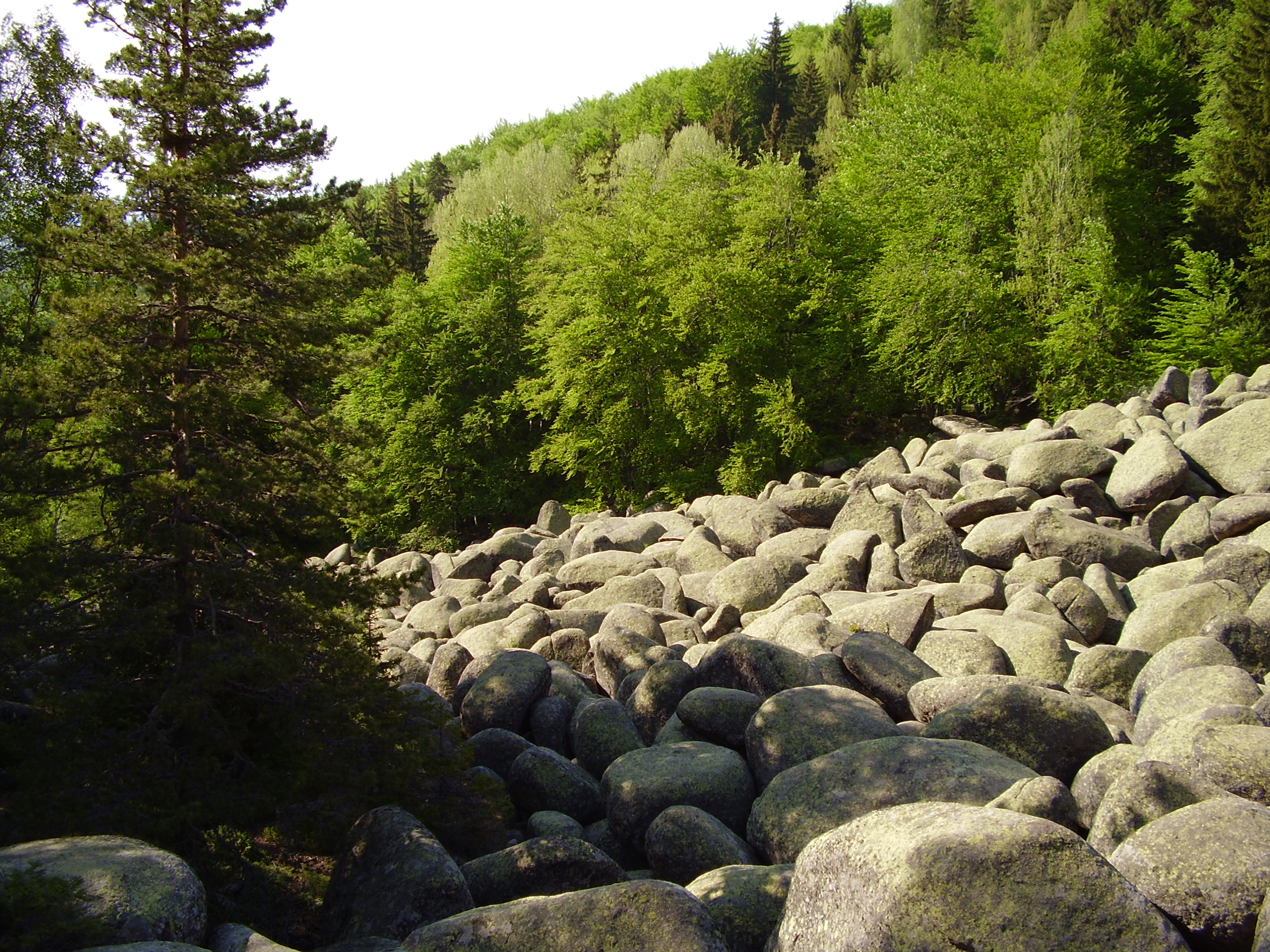
74. Stone river in Vitosha

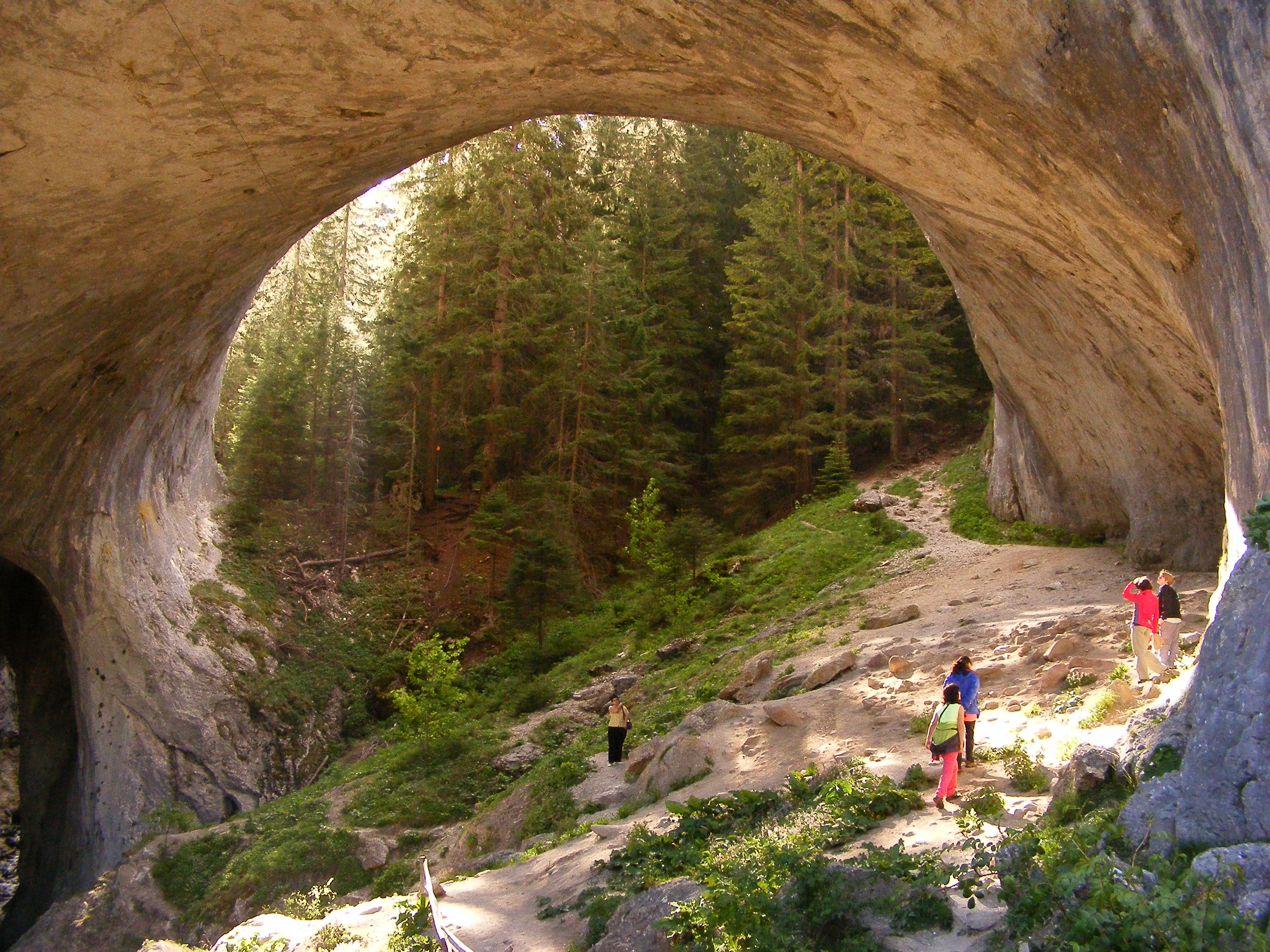
85. The Wonderful Bridges

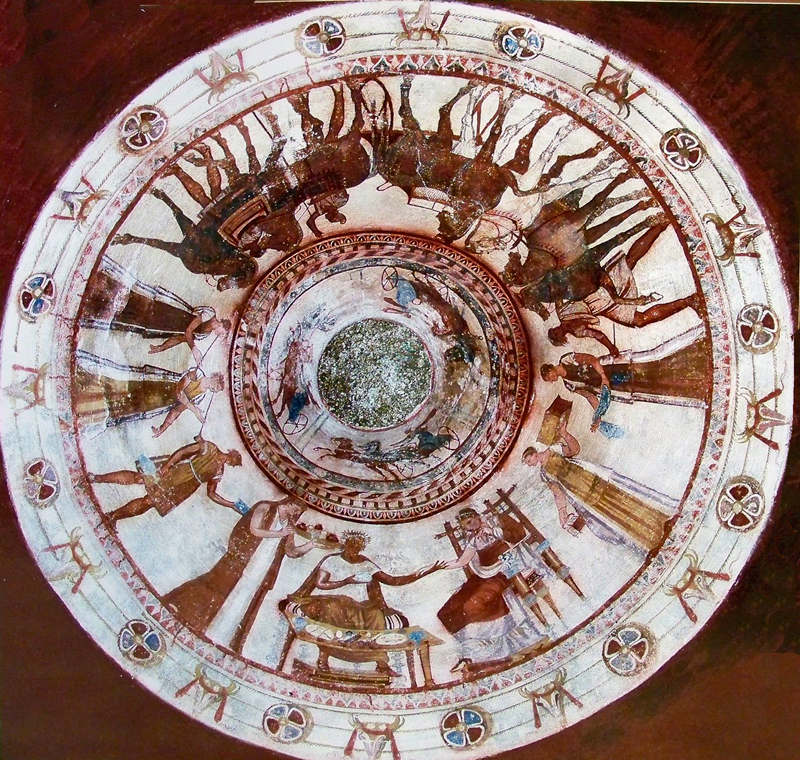
91. Thracian Tomb of Kazanlak

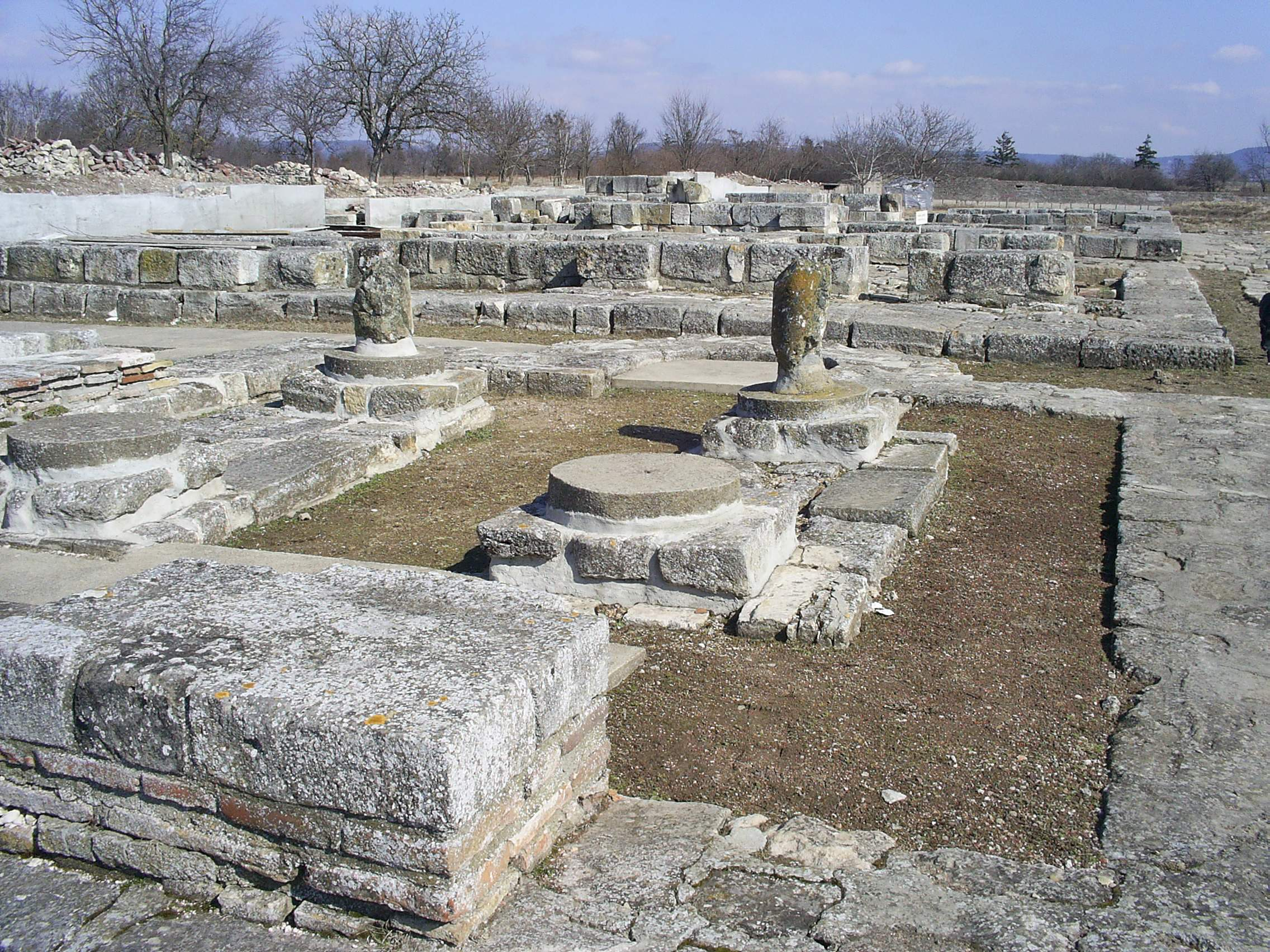
96. Pliska, the first Bulgarian capital between 681 and 893

1. Bansko — Velyanov House, Neofit Rilski Museum, Nikola Vaptsarov Museum, Permanent Icon Exhibition "Bansko Art School".
1. a Bansko- Holy Trinity Church
2. Pirin mountain — Vihren Peak
3. Dobarsko village — Church of Theodore Tyro and Theodore Stratilates
4. Melnik — Historical Museum of Melnik, Kordopulov House, 4a Rozhen Monastery.
5. Petrich — Rupite Protected Area including St. Petka Church, 5a Samuil's Fortress National Park Museum, 5b Heraclea Sintica ancient Greek city.
6. Nesebar —Nesebar Archaeological Museum
  6a Pomorie – Salt Museum, Pomorie, 6bLake Pomorie
7. Burgas – Cathedral of Saints Cyril and Methodius, Poda Protected Area, '7a Aytos rock formation "Three brothers"
8. Malko Tarnovo — Petrova Niva Site, Museum of History
  8a. Sozopol — Archaeological Museum
9. Varna — Museum of History and the Maritime Museum
10. Devnya — Museum of Mosaics
11. Veliko Tarnovo — Tsarevets archaeological reserve, Museum of History, Arbanasi architectural reserve
12. Svishtov — Aleko Konstantinov's House
13. Vidin — Konaka Museum (Museum of History) and Baba Vida Fortress
14. Magura Cave
15. Belogradchik – Museum of History, Belogradchik Rocks. (Formerly also: Belogradchik Fortress)
16. Vratsa — Ledenika Cave, Regional Museum of History
  16a. Mezdra (added in the 2010s) – Kaleto archaeological complex
17. Mount Okolchitsa — the place of Hristo Botev's death
18. Kozloduy — Radetzky steamship-museum, Monument of Hristo Botev
19. Gabrovo — Etar Architectural-Ethnographic Complex, Museum of Education, Uzana locality, House of Humour and Satire
20. Bozhentsi village — Architectural and historical reserve
21. Tryavna — Museum of the Wood-Carving and Ethnographical Arts
22. Dryanovo — Dryanovo Monastery, Kolyu Ficheto Museum, Bacho Kiro Cave
23. Dobrich — House of Yordan Yovkov, Art Gallery
24. Balchik — Palace complex
  24a. University Botanic Garden
  24b. Kavarna — Kaliakra Headland, Kaliakra Archaeological reserve
25. Kardzhali — Ruins of Perperikon, Monastery of John the Precursor (Св. Йоан Предтеча)
  25a. Regional Museum of History
26. Kyustendil — Vladimir Dimitrov Art Gallery, House of Dimitar Peshev, Medieval Church of St George museum, regional historical museum
27. Blagoevgrad (added in the 2010s) – Varosha Quarter, regional historical museum
  27a. Ruen Peak in Osogovo Mountain
28. Rila Monastery
29. Skakavitsa Chalet and the Seven Rila Lakes
30. Lovech — Vasil Levski Museum, Kakrina Inn
  30a. Karlukovo (added in the 2010s) – National cave house
  30b. Devetaki – Devetashka cave
31. Troyan — Natural History Museum at Cherni Osam, Troyan Monastery, Museum of Folk Arts
32. Teteven — Museum of History
33. Brestnitsa village — Saeva Dupka Cave
34. Berkovitsa — Museum of Ethnography, House of Ivan Vasov. (Formerly also: Kom Peak)
35. Pazardzhik — Church of Virgin Mary, House of Stanislav Dospevski, Regional Museum of History
36. Panagyurishte — Oborishte locality, House of Rayna Knyaginya
37. Peshtera — Snezhanka Cave, Peristera Fortress
38. Batak — Museum of History
39. Tran — the Gorge on the Jerma River
  39a. Pernik (added in the 2010s) – Underground mining museum
40. Pleven — St George the Conqueror Chapel Mausoleum, Pleven Panorama, Regional Museum of History
41. Plovdiv — Roman theatre, Ethnography Museum, Museum of History. (Formerly also: Old Plovdiv architectural reserve, St. Konstantin and Elena Church)
42. Perushtitsa — Museum of History
43. Sopot — the Nunnery, House of Ivan Vazov
44. Karlovo — Vasil Levski National Museum, Museum of History
45. Kalofer — Hristo Botev National Museum
46. Sandanski (added in the 2010s) – Episcopal Basilica, Archaeological Museum
  46a.The Botev Peak
47. Asenovgrad — The Bachkovo Monastery, Asenova krepost fortress, Museum of History
48. Razgrad — Abrittus Archaeological reserve
49. Isperih — Museum of History, Sboryanovo museum of history and archaeology, the Thracian town of Chelis and Demir Baba Tekke at Sveshtari village. (Formerly also: Thracian Tomb)
50. Ruse — House of Zahari Stoyanov, Pantheon of National Revival Heroes
51. Silistra — Museum of History, Medcidi Tabi fortress
52. Srebarna Nature Reserve
53. Tutrakan — Military Tomb Memorial Complex, Museum of Danube Fishing and Boat-Making.
54. Sliven — House of Hadzhi Dimitar, National Textile Museum, Art Gallery
55. Velingrad (added in the 2010s) – Museum of History. (The Sinite Kamani Natural park and Karandila Chalet previously occupied this position.)
56. Kotel — Georgi Sava Rakovski's Pantheon and the Museum of Famous People of the Bulgarian Revival Age, Natural History Museum
57. Zheravna village — House of Yordan Yovkov. (Formerly also: Architecture and Ethnography Reserve)
58. Sofia — The National Museum of History
  58a. Boyana Church National Museum
59. Sofia — Alexander Nevsky Cathedral
  59a. (added in the 2010s) National Museum of Military History
60. Elena (added in the 2010s) – House of Hilarion of Makariopolis, Daskalolivnitsa historical complex. (The National Church Museum of History and Archaeology in Sofia previously occupied this position.)
61. Sofia — Earth and Man National Museum
  61a. National Palace of Culture
62. Sofia — National Gallery for Foreign Art, maintained by the Bulgarian Academy of Sciences
  62a. National Art Gallery
63. Etropole — Museum of History, Clocktower, Monastery of the Holy Trinity
64. Krestevic, Sredna Gora (added in the 2010s) — Buntovna Commemorative Tourist Complex
65. Sofia — National Museum of Natural History maintained by the Bulgarian Academy of Sciences
66. Sofia — Museum of the History of Sport located inside the Vasil Levski National Stadium
  66a. Sofia Zoo
  66b. (added in the 2010s) National Anthropological Museum maintained by the Bulgarian Academy of Sciences
67. Starosel village — Thracian tomb
  67a. Hisarya — Archaeological Museum
68. Sofia — Institute of Archaeology and Museum maintained by the Bulgarian Academy of Sciences
  68a. (added in the 2010s) National Polytechnical Museum
69. Chiprovtsi (added in the 2010s) – Museum of History, Chiprovtsi Monastery
70. Bratsigovo — Town Museum of History
71. Chirpan — House Museum of Peyo Yavorov, Nikola Manev Art Gallery, St. Athanasius monastery in Zlatna Livada village. (The St. Sophia Temple formerly occupied this position.)
72. Haskovo (added in the 2010s) – Virgin Mary monument, Aleksandrovo tomb and museum centre. (The Sofia Synagogue occupied this position prior to 2007.)
  72a. (added in the 2010s) Mezek – Medieval fortress, Thracian domed tomb.
  72b. (added in the 2010s) Ivaylovgrad – Villa Armira, Municipal historical museum.
73. Dimitrovgrad — History Museum, the House of Penyo Penev, Giordano Bruno observatory
74. Vitosha (added in the 2010s) — Aleko Chalet.
  74a. Cherni Vrah
75. Koprivshtitsa — Archaeology and History Reserve
76. Nova Zagora (added in the 2010s) – Karanova Mogila museum. (Bogdan Peak at Sredna Gora formerly occupied this position.)
77. Klisura — Museum of History
78. Osenovlag village — Seven Altars Monastery
79. Samokov — Museum of History, the Nunnery.
  79a. Belchin village (added in the 2010s) – Tsar Mali Town.
80. Rila — Musala Peak
81. Botevgrad — the Clocktower. (Slivnitsa town cemetery occupied this position prior to 2005.)
82. Skravena village — monument at St. Nikolai Monastery to the members of Hristo Botev's detachment
83. Smolyan — Museum of History. (Uhlovitsa Cave formerly occupied this position.)
  83a. Smolyan Planetarium
  83b. Momchilovtsi village
84. Pamporovo — Uhlovitsa Cave, Snezhanka Peak
85. Rhodope Mountains – Golyam Perelik Peak, The Wonderful Bridges
86. Zlatograd — Ethnography Complex
87. Rhodope Mountains – Shiroka Laka village archaeological reserve
  87a. Madan, Smolyan Province – Rhodope Crystal Hall, Sharenka Cave
88. Rhodope Mountains – Trigrad Gorge. (Formerly also: the Devil's Throat Cave)
89. Rhodope Mountains – Yagodinska cave, Buynovo gorge
90. Stara Zagora – the Neolithic Houses Museum, the Stara Zagora Defenders Memorial Complex, Museum of History. (Formerly also: the Roman Forum of Augusta Traiana)
91. Kazanlak – Chudomir Art and Literature Museum, Thracian Tomb of Kazanlak
92. Shipka town — Shipka Memorial Church
93. Shipka Pass — Shipka Memorial
94. Shumen — Shumen Fortress Historical and Archaeological Reserve, Founders of Bulgaria Monument, Regional Museum of History
95. Shumen — Tombul Mosque
96. Pliska — Archaeological Reserve Pliska, Great Basilica, Pliska
97. Madara — Madara Rider
98. Veliki Preslav – National Historical and Archaeological Reserve
99. Yambol — the ancient town of Kabile,

Museum of History

1. Elhovo — Museum of Ethnography
