= Agushevi konatsi =

- Агушеви конаци
- Mogilitsa, Smolyan Municipality in Bulgaria
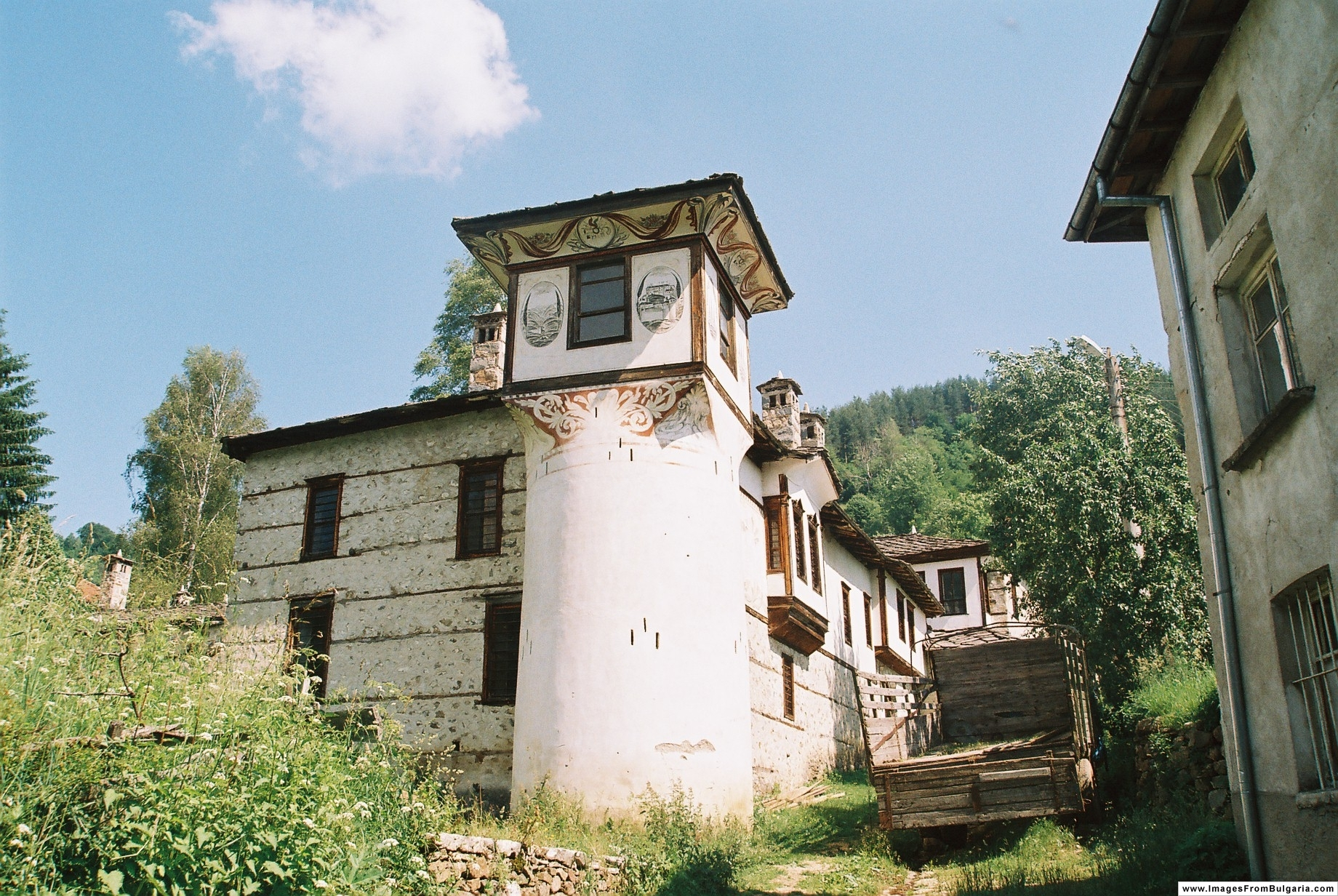
- Agushevi konatsi

Site information
- Type: Castle
- Owner: Private ownership|Private
- Open to the public: Public

Location
- Coordinates: 41°29′44″N 24°38′08″E

Site history
- Materials: stone, wood

Agushevi konatsi (Bulgarian: Агушеви конаци, "The Agush Agha's Konaks"), built during the 19th century, is a winter estate of the Ottoman feudal who belongend to the Pomaks in Mogilitsa village in Smolyan Municipality, Smolyan Province, Bulgaria.

It is formed of three consecutive identical large residential edifices with courtyards. It was declared a national monument of art and culture under Government Order No PMC 388 on 30 December 1964. It was named after the title of its owner, Agush Aga.

== Location ==
Agushevi konatsi is located in the Mogilitsa village on the Rhodope Mountains of southern Bulgaria. It is at a distance of 25 kilometres (16 mi) to the south of the town of Smolyan.

== History ==
The feudal estate was built from 1820 to 1840 (1840-42 is also mentioned) by Aguş Ağa a son of Hacı Osman, an Ottoman feudal of Pomaks origin, who ruled the Agaluk of Ahiçelebi (Smolyan Province), with the main city Paşmaklı (Smolyan). It was built as the residence of the agha and his three sons Hüseyin, Salih, Arif and named after Agush Agha, the owner. Konatsi's singular form is “konak”, which means a "palatial residence, large house". The complex was built by three master craftsmen of Bulgaria. There is an inscription at the entrance to one of the courtyards dated to 1843.

== Features ==
The castle ensemble consists of three successive buildings built exclusively as a summer residential accommodation for the Ottoman feudal, each as an exclusive functional building. It has three courtyards within which the residences of the feudal lord and his sons were built. The complex also provides for residential buildings for the attendants to the family and casual workers on the farm lands. The farm lands have a shed, barn and other structures related to farming. Each courtyard had a well. The residential area consists of several rooms, salons, passages, tunnels and secret enclosures. The entire complex is encircled by thick walls fortified with towers; with the outer high tower having a unique design. The height of the enclosure wall gradually rises from one end to the other. The entire complex is fitted with 221 windows, 86 doors and 24 chimneys. The towers, and interior walls have elegant decorations and the eaves projecting from the roof are colourfully painted. The towers and walls of the edifice are painted predominantly in white and brown colour, which gives it a very elegant appearance.

== Gallery ==
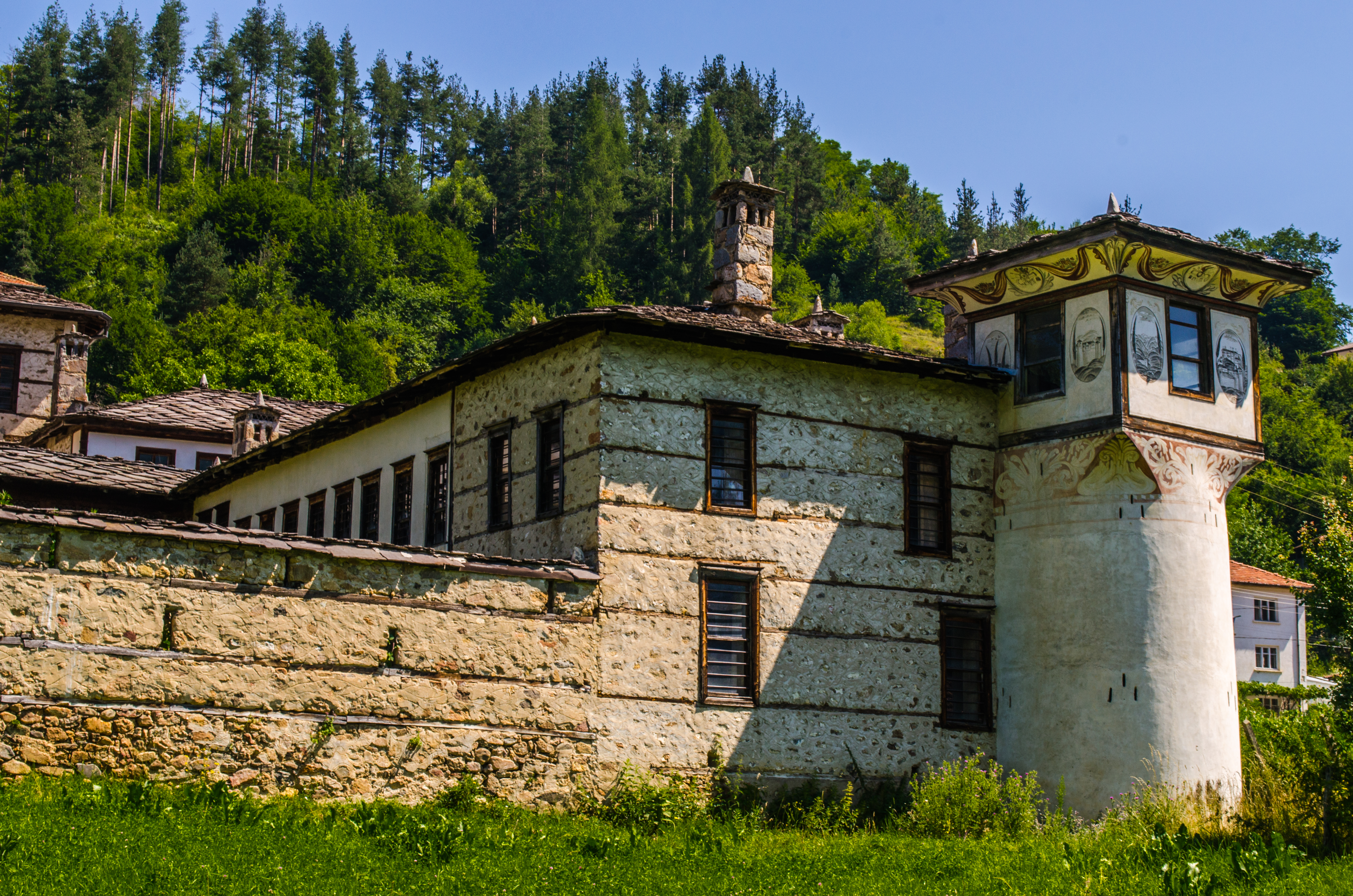

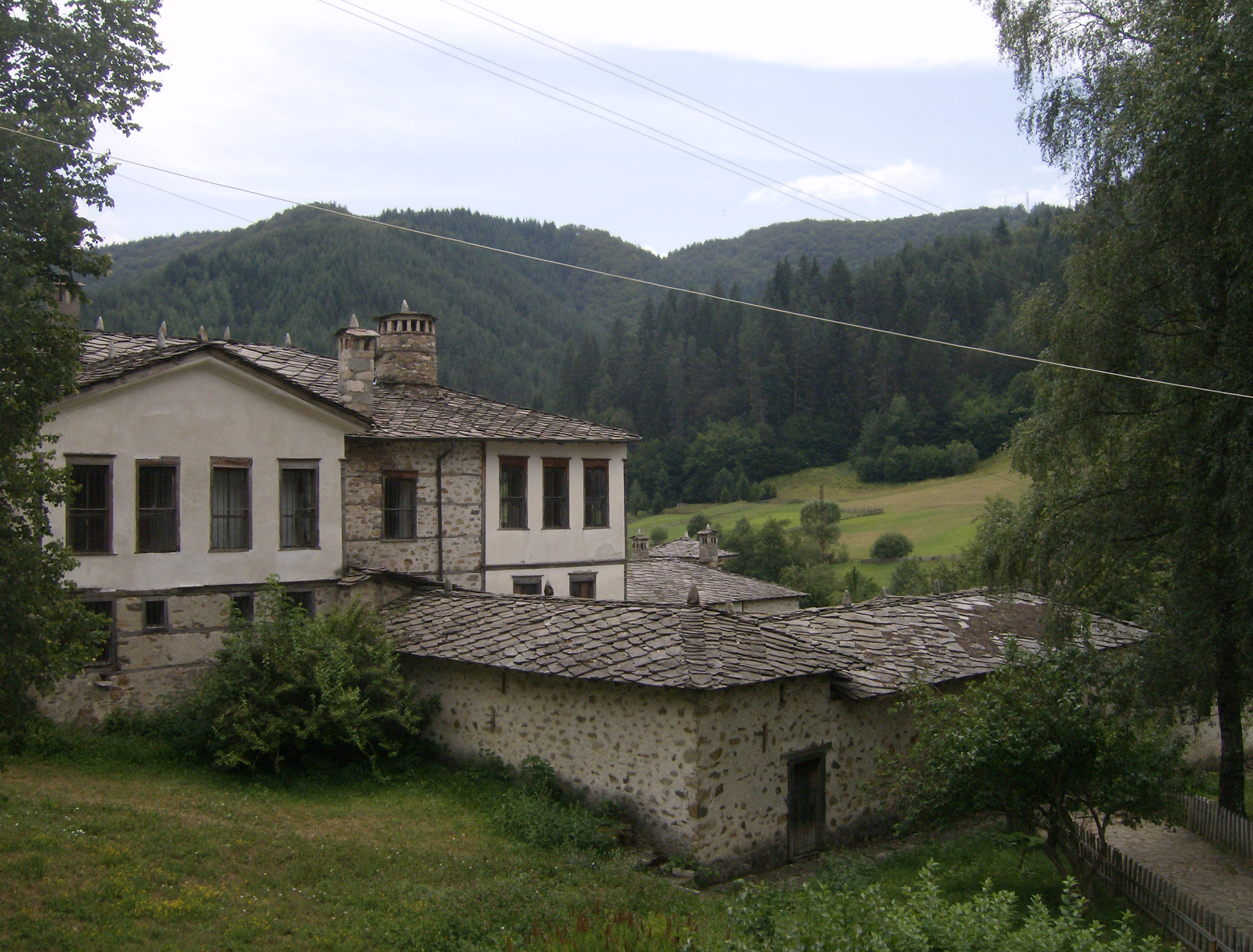

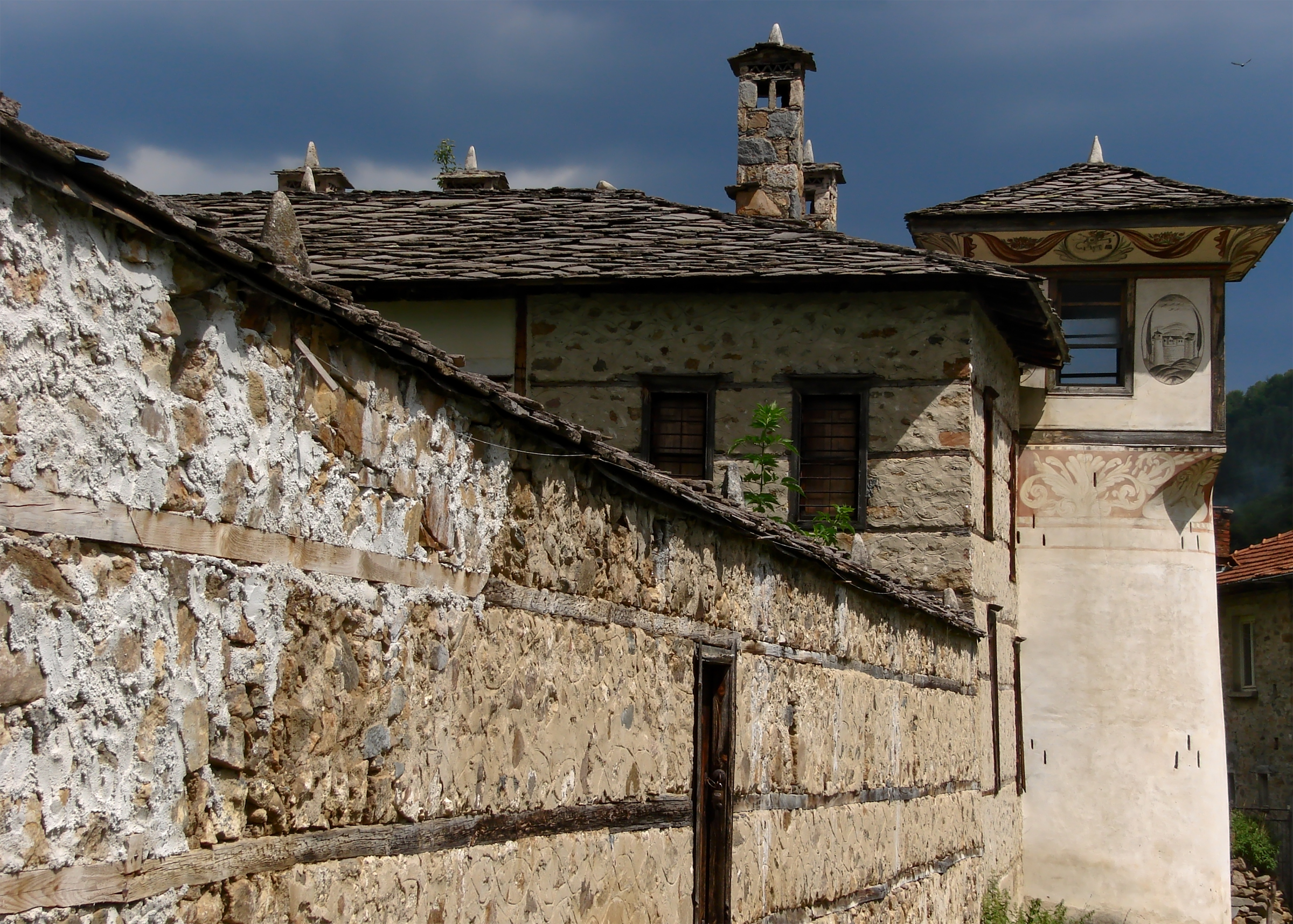

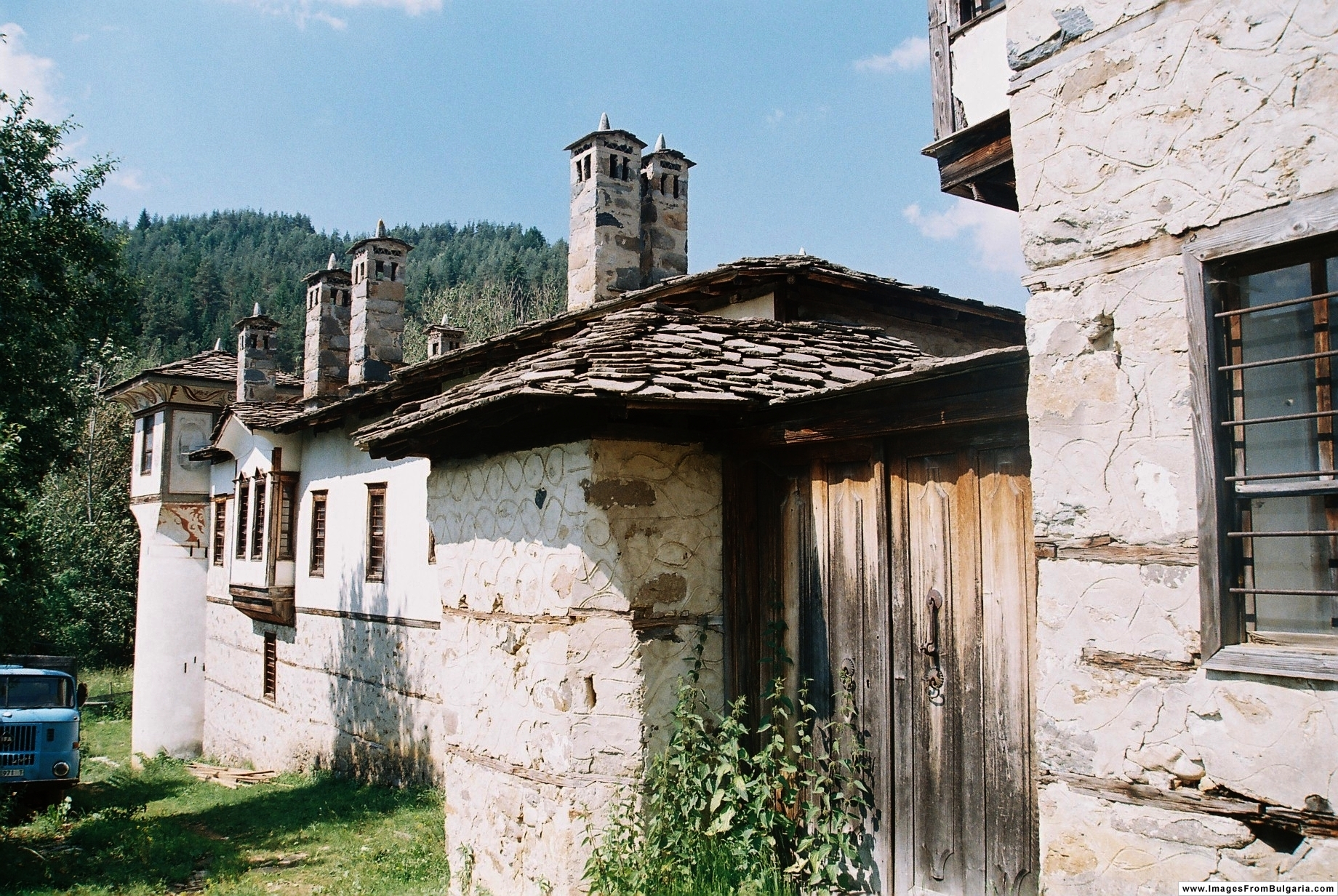
