= Saeva dupka =

Cave in Lovech Province, Bulgaria

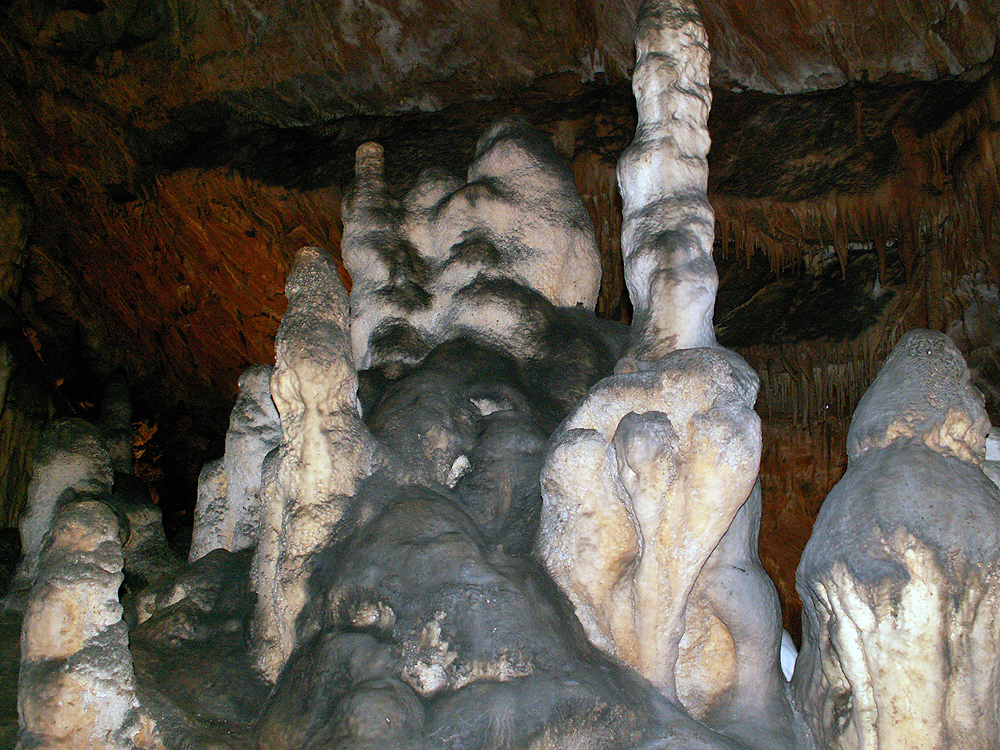
The White Castle stalagmite formation

Saeva dupka (Bulgarian: Съева дупка) is a cave in northern Bulgaria near the village of Brestnitsa, Lovech Province (43°2′N 24°11′E). The cave has naturally formed 400 meters of corridors and halls. The cave has hosted many choral music performances, thanks to the excellent acoustic conditions. Saeva dupka was named after two brothers, Seyu and Sae, who used it as a hiding place during the Ottoman occupation of Bulgaria. Recent excavations have shown the cave was inhabited since Roman times. Saeva dupka is one of the 100 Tourist Sites of Bulgaria.
