= Mogilitsa =

Mogilitsa Могилица
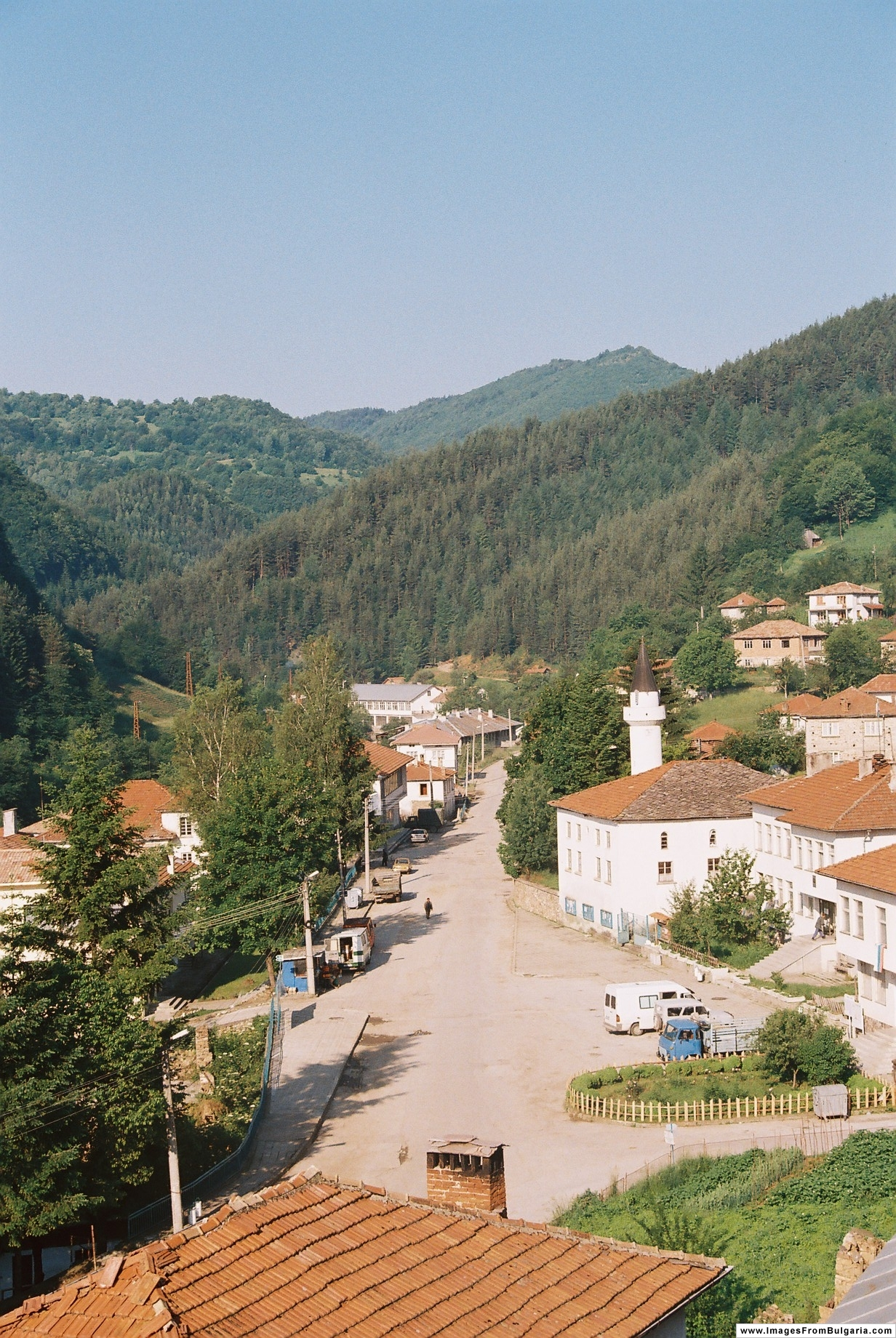
- View towards Mogilitsa

- Kalotina
- Coordinates: 41°29′46″N 24°37′59″E
- Country: Bulgaria
- Province (Oblast): Smolyan

Government
  - Mayor: Mitko Chochev
- Elevation: 1,041 m (3,415 ft)

Population (2010)
  - Total: 391
- Time zone: UTC+2 (EET)
  - Summer (DST): UTC+3 (EEST)
- Postal Code: 4761
- Area code: 03036

Mogilitsa (Bulgarian: Могилица; also Mogilitza, Mogilica, meaning "hillock") is a village in the Rhodope Mountains in southernmost Bulgaria, part of Smolyan municipality, Smolyan Province. As of September 2005, it has a population of 483. Mogilitsa lies at 41°30′N 24°39′E, 1,041 m above mean sea level, near the border with Greece and the upper course of the river Arda, 35 kilometres southeast of Smolyan.

Mogilitsa is famous for Agushevi konatsi (Агушеви конаци), the 19th-century winter estate of a rich Ottoman feudal lord, Agush Agha (title) who belongend to the Pomaks, and his three sons. Built in 1825-1872 by local Bulgarian masters, the castle-like complex consists of three buildings with a separate yard surrounded by a common wall with a richly decorated tower in the southeastern corner. The estate has a total of 221 windows, 86 doors and 24 chimneys and is situated near the banks of the Arda. Paşmaklı Smolyan was the main city of Ahiçelebi, Smolyan Province, until 1912 de facto independent.

Northwest of the village lie the ruins of an old fortress, possibly from Thracian times. Three kilometres to the east of Mogilitsa is Uhlovitsa, one of the twenty caves in the vicinity of the village, which features water cascades and small underground lakes.

== Gallery ==
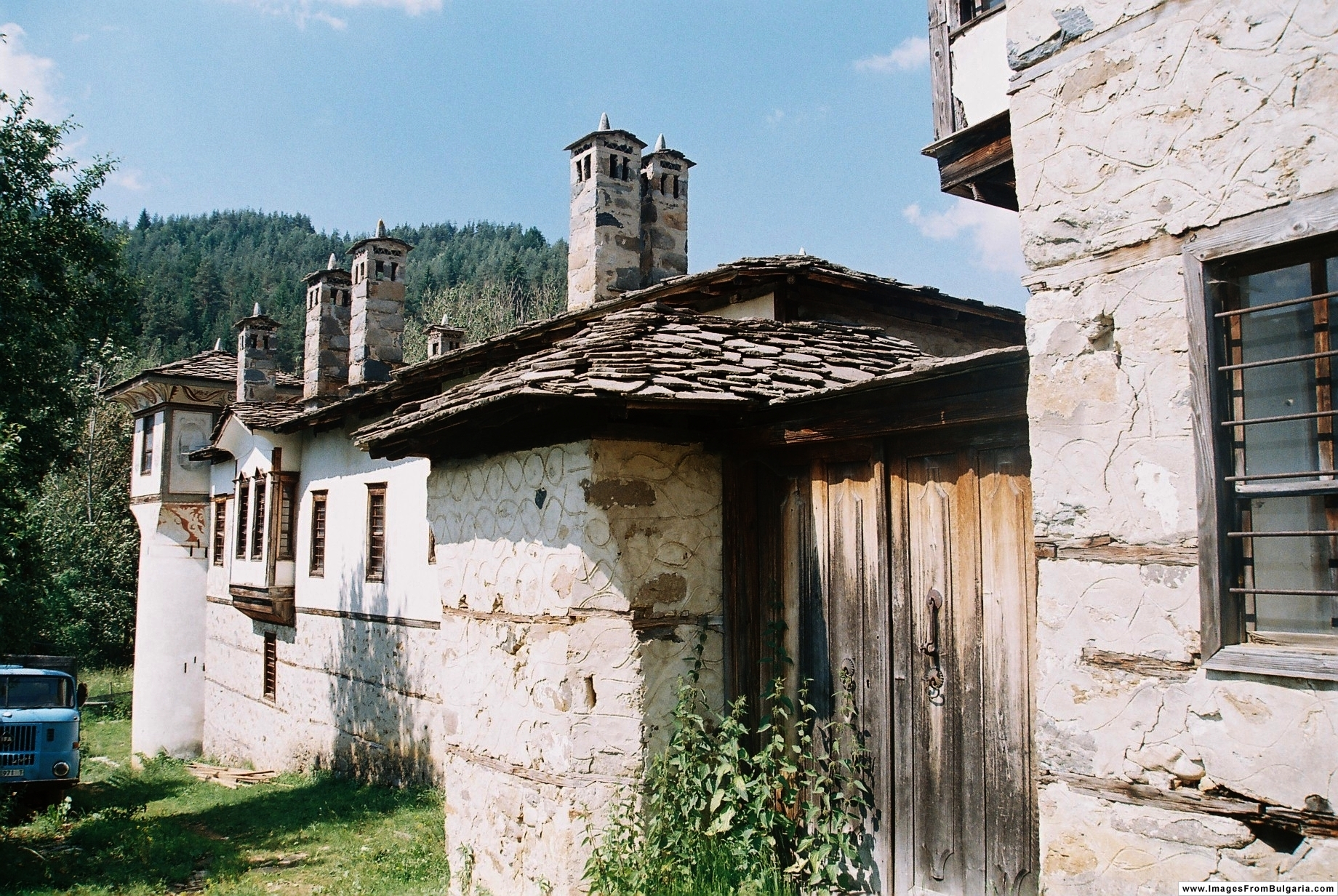
Agushevi konatsi

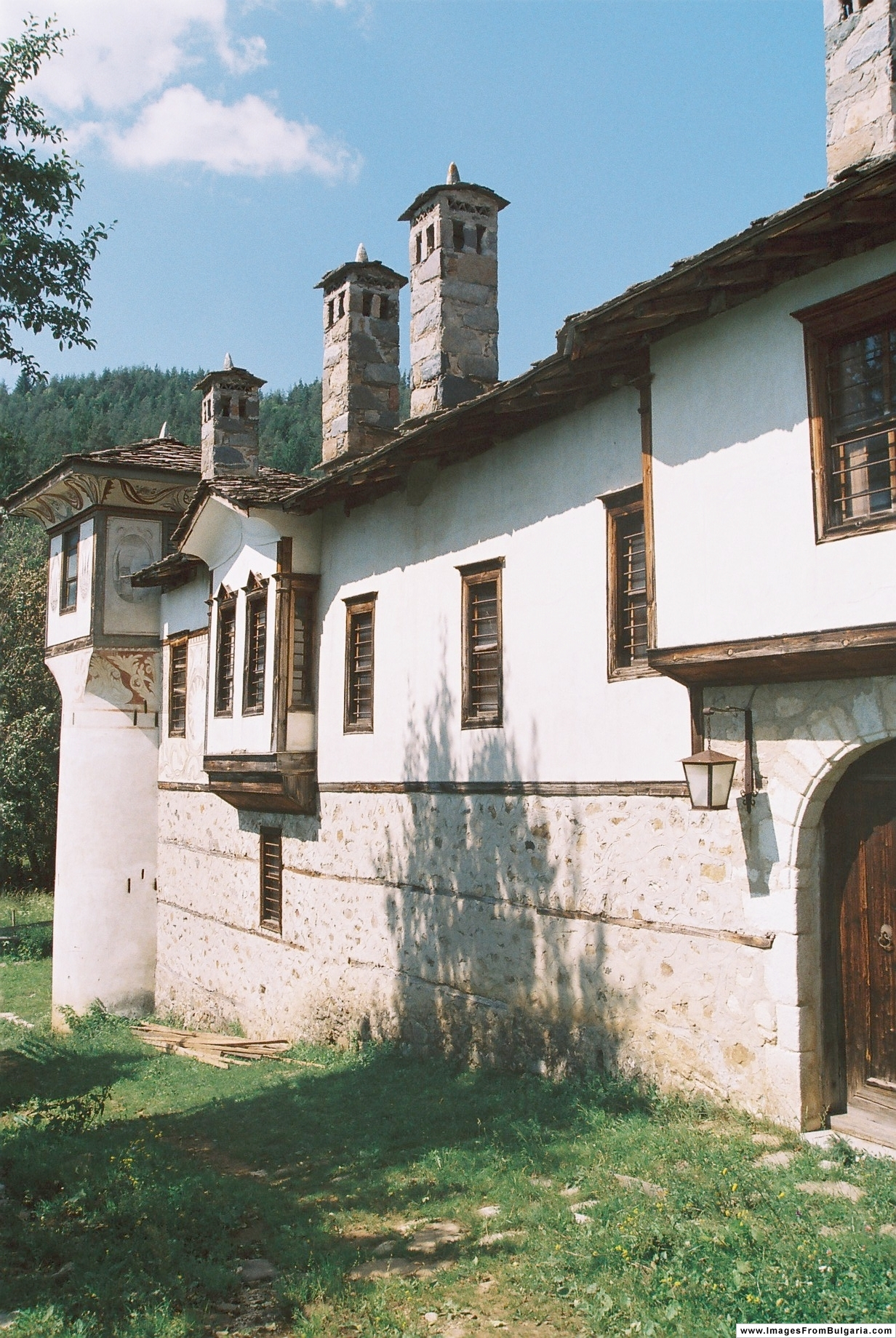
Agushevi konatsi

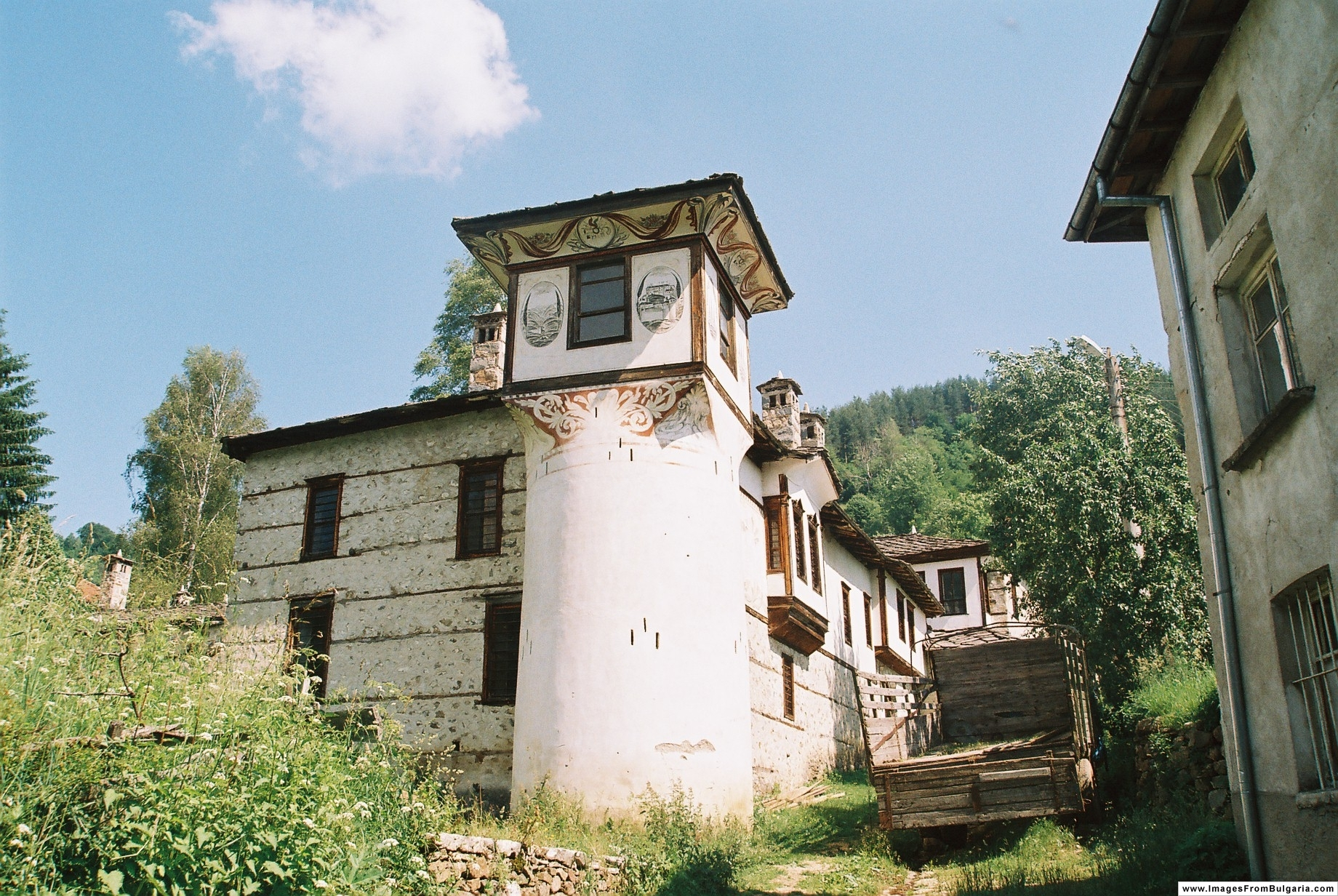
Agushevi konatsi
