= Marvelous Bridges =

Coordinates: 41.819°N 24.581°E

The Marvelous Bridges or Wonderful Bridges (Bulgarian: Чудни[те] мостове, Chudni[te] mostove) are natural arches in the Rhodope Mountains of southern Bulgaria. They are located in the karst valley of the Erkyupriya River in the Western Rhodopes at 1,450 metres (4,760 ft) metres above sea level, at the foot of Persenk Peak.

== Description ==
The "bridges" were formed by the erosive activity of the once larger Erkyupryia River. It transformed the marble clefts into a deep-water cave, the ceiling of which eroded through time and collapsed, possibly during an earthquake. Geologists suggest that the water carried the debris away.

As a result, the two remaining bridge-shaped outcrops remained. The larger one (upstream) is 15 metres at its widest and 96 metres long, and shaped by three vaulted arches, the largest of which is 45 metres high and 40 metres wide. The river flows under the middle-sized arch. The larger Wonderful Bridge is passable under the vaults, where birds nest in the marble clefts. The smaller bridge is 200 metres downstream. It is impassable to tourists, 60 metres in length, with a total height of 50 metres, 30 metres at the highest point of the arch. A third, small and inaccessible, formation follows, the entrance to a pothole where the river's waters disappear underground, reaching a sump after 3 km.

The adjacent area is wooded, with century-old conifers, mainly spruces. Many karst caves are known nearby, but most of them are undeveloped and unsuitable for tourist visits. However, both bridges can be crossed on secure trails. Two tourist huts are located nearby. The site can be reached by an asphalt road and is about 30 km from the closest town, Chepelare.

The Wonderful Bridges are included among the 100 National Touristic Places of the Bulgarian Touristic Union, under number 85.

== Gallery ==
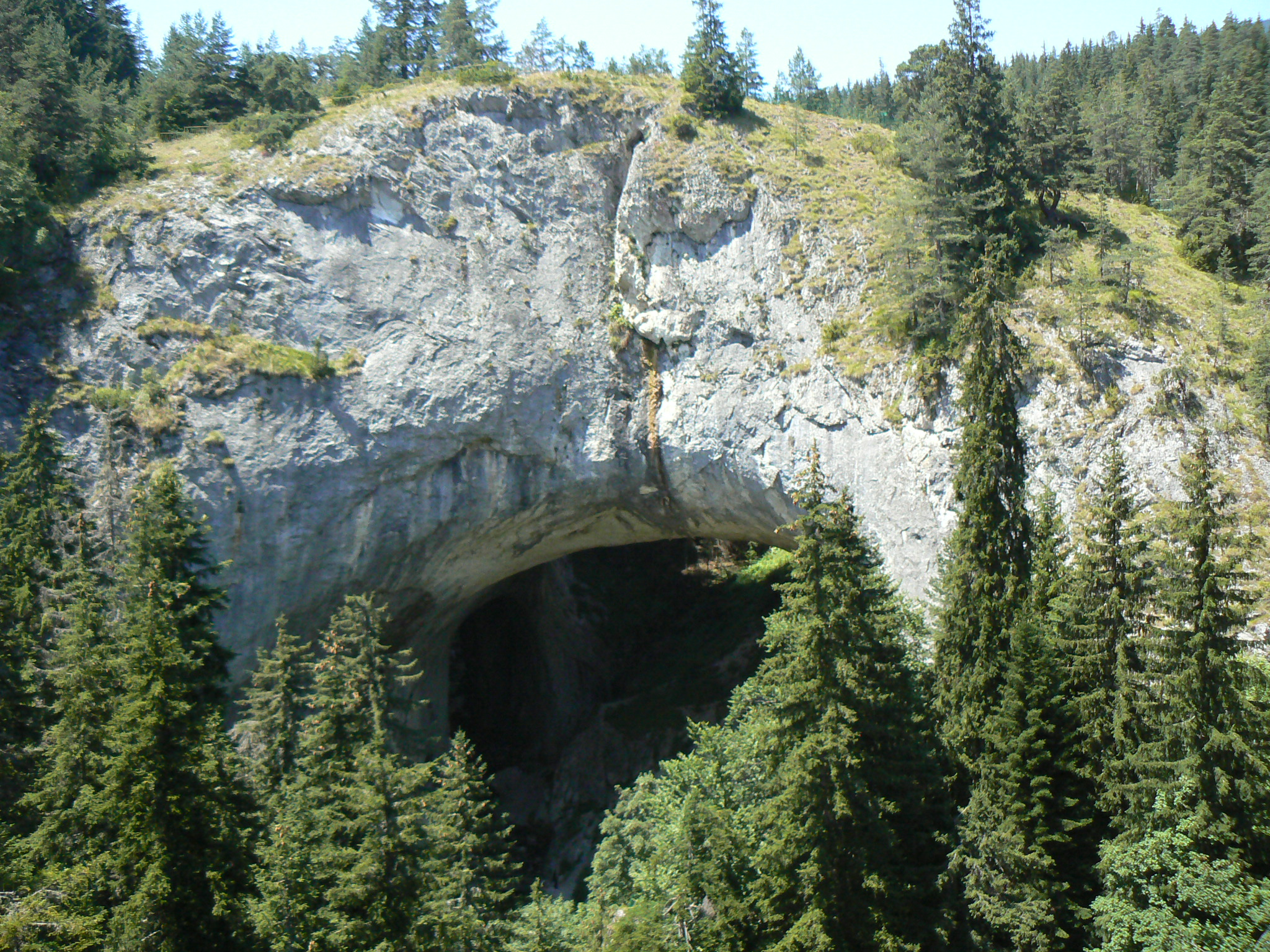
The larger bridge as seen from the smaller

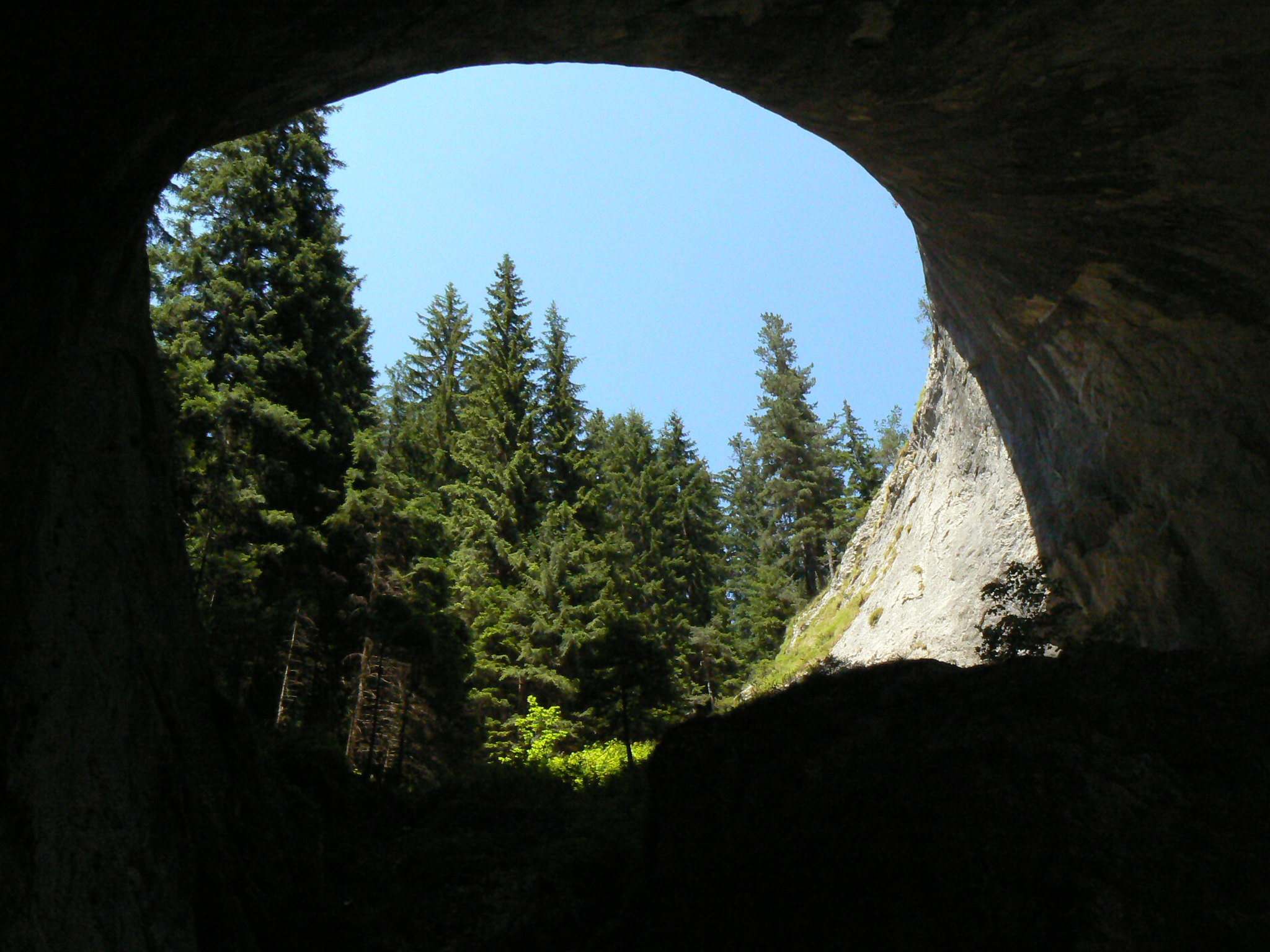
The larger bridge as seen from below

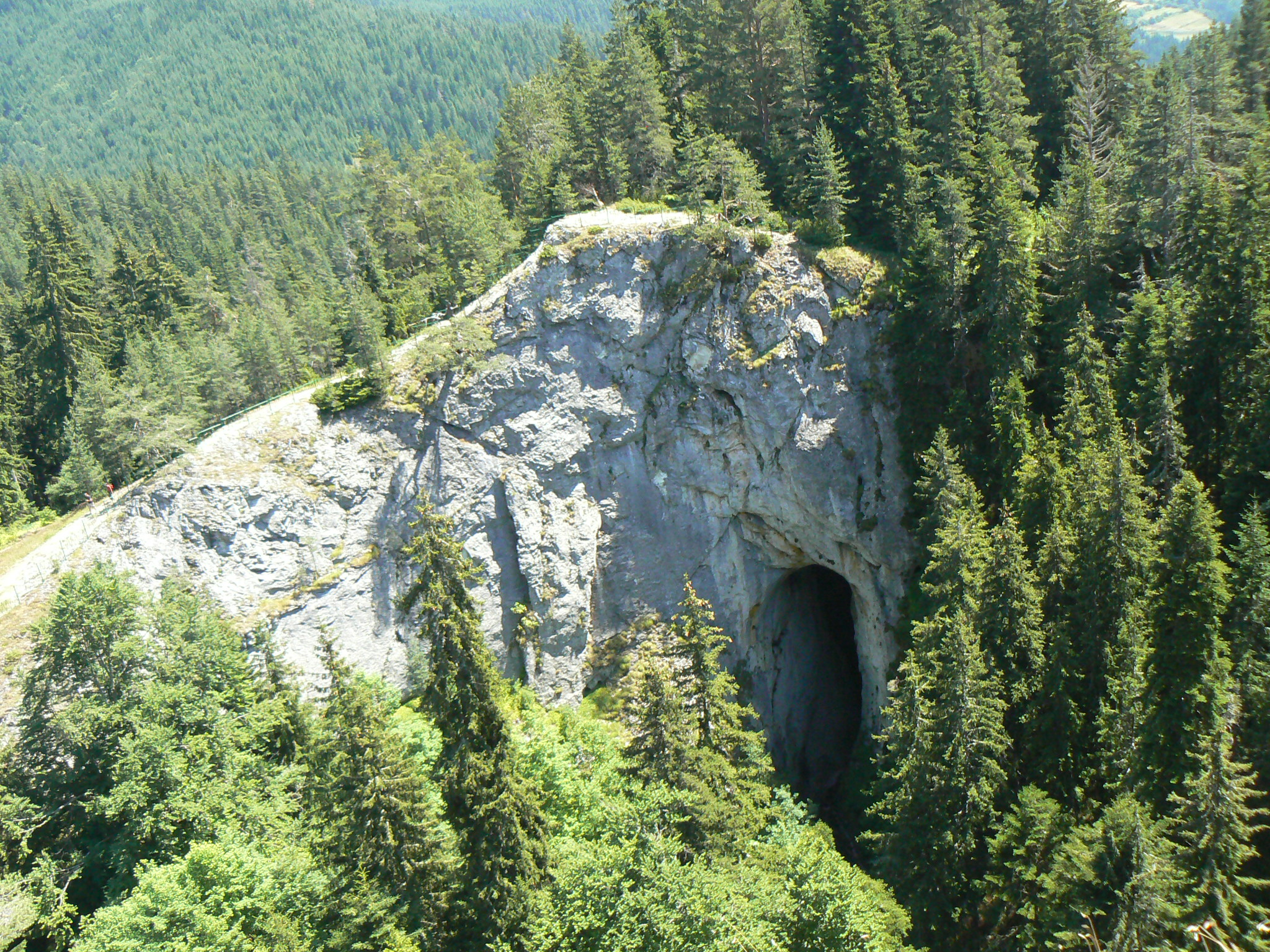
The smaller bridge as seen from the larger

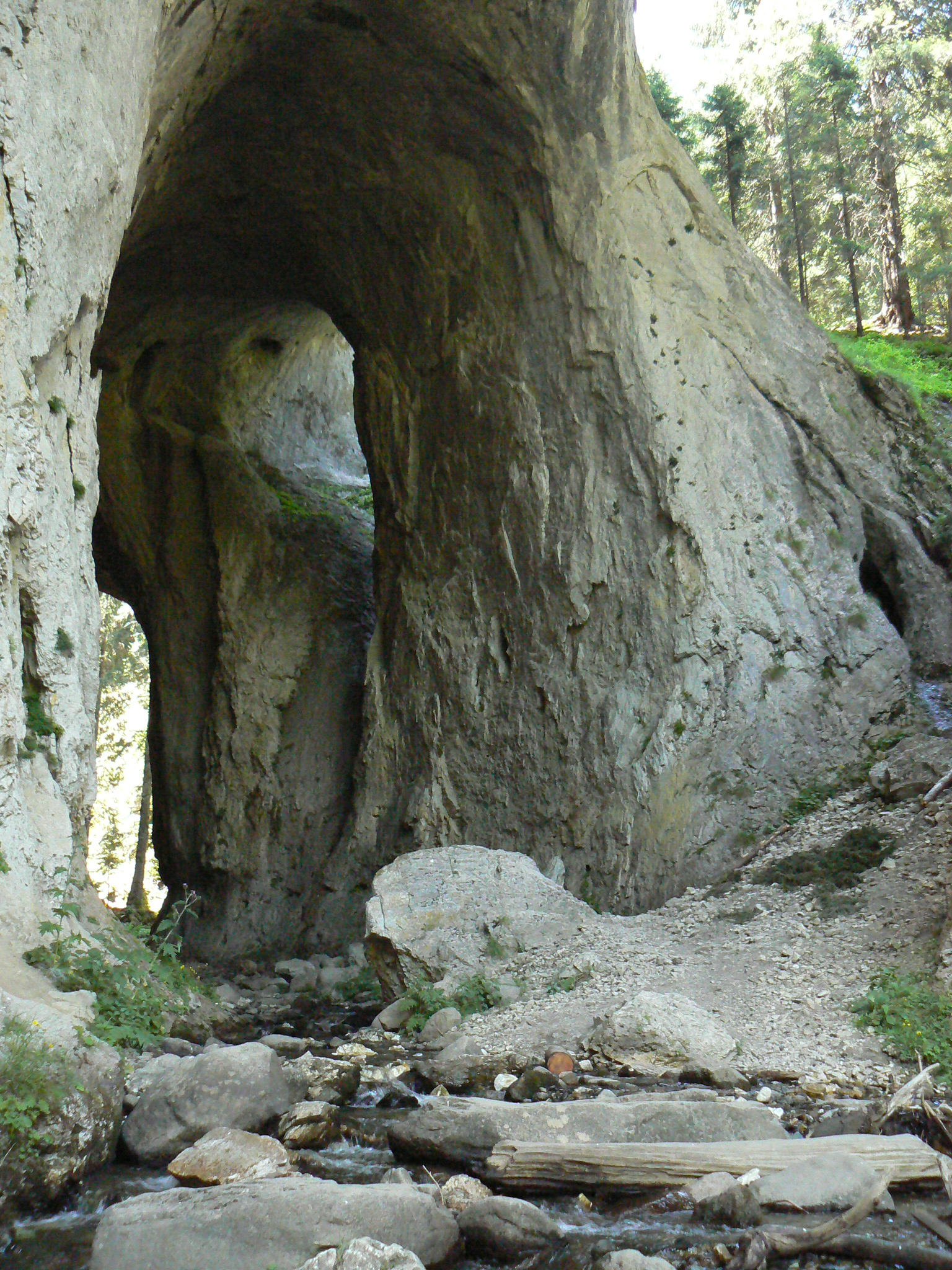
The Erkyupriya River flowing under the large bridge
