= Uhlovitsa =

Coordinates: 41°30′33″N 24°39′16″E

A picturesque niche with corallites

The Icefall

Uhlovitsa (Bulgarian: Ухловица) is a show cave in the Blue Pools Area (Bulgarian: Mестността „Сините вирове“, or Mestnostta "Sinite virove") in the Smolyan Province of the Rhodope Mountains, southern Bulgaria. The cave is close to Mogilitsa village and 37 and 47 km away from Pamporovo and Chepelare respectively. About 3000 tourists visit the cave every year.

Uhlovitsa is about 460 m long, 330 m of which are well-explored and developed. It is 1040 metres above sea level. The average temperature is about 10–11°C.

Many corallites can be found in the cave, as can an impressive flowstone formation known as the Icefall at its end.

The cave was discovered in 1967 by Dimitar and Georgi Raichev. The name Uhlovitsa comes from the word "улулица", meaning Strix.
