= Nesebar Archaeological Museum =

Museum in Bulgaria

Coordinates: 42°39′32″N 27°44′2″E

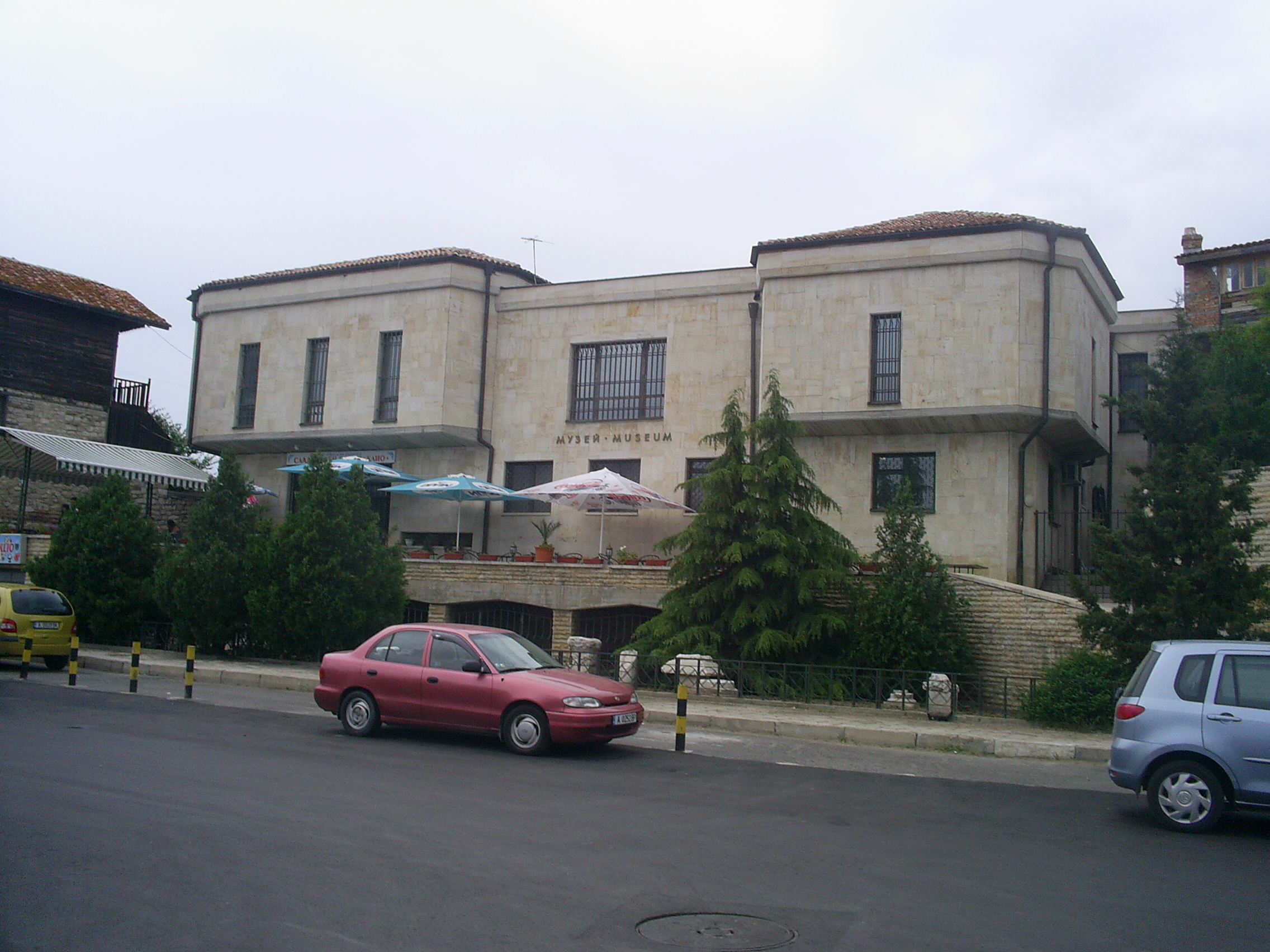
The edifice of the Nesebar Archaeological Museum

The Nesebar Archaeological Museum (Bulgarian: Археологически музей Несебър, Arheologicheski muzey Nesebar) is a museum located in Nesebar, a town on the Black Sea coast of southeast Bulgaria.

== Description ==
The Nesebar Archaeological museum is founded in 1956 and its first home was the Church of Saint John the Baptist, Nesebar.

In 1994 the museum was hosted in a new building, designed by architect Hristo Koev. The museum exposition contains cultural monuments from different ages of the history of Nesebar.
