= Aleksandrovo, Haskovo Province =

Aleksandrovo
- Village
- Location within Bulgaria
Coordinates: 41°58′58″N 25°43′35″E
- Country: Bulgaria
- Province: Haskovo Province
- Municipality: Haskovo
- Time zone: UTC+2 (EET)
  - Summer (DST): UTC+3 (EEST)

Aleksandrovo is a village in Haskovo Municipality, in Haskovo Province, in southern Bulgaria.

This village, once belonged to the Hasköylü Ağalık, (Agaluk of Haskovo)
