= Yugovska reka =

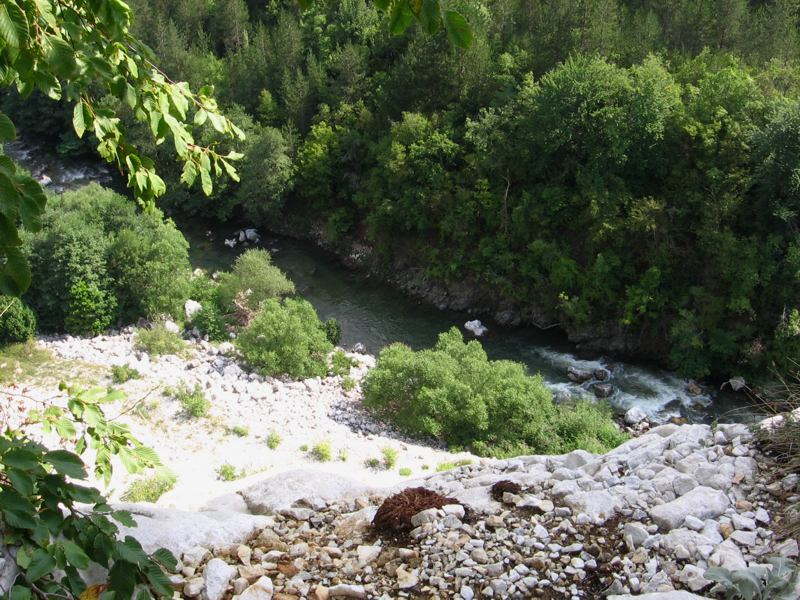

Location
- Country: Bulgaria

Physical characteristics
- Source
  - location: western Rhodope Mountains
  - coordinates: 41°41′3.84″N 24°50′40.92″E
  - elevation: 1,840 m (6,040 ft)
- Mouth
  - location: Chepelarska reka
  - coordinates: 41°54′41.04″N 24°48′14.04″E
  - elevation: 485 m (1,591 ft)
- Length: 45 km (28 mi)
- Basin size: 332 km^{2} (128 sq mi)

Basin features
- Progression: Chepelarska reka→ Maritsa

The Yugovska reka (Bulgarian: Юговска река) is a 45 km long river in southern Bulgaria, flowing through Smolyan and Plovdiv Provinces. It is a right tributary of the Chepelarska reka, itself a right tributary of the Maritsa.

The river springs under the name Manastirska reka at an altitude of 1,840 m some 200 m north of the summit of Kurbaneri (1,864 m) in the Prespanski division of the western Rhodope Mountains. After the Haydushki Polyani resort area it flows in northern direction in a narrow deep valley, which widens only around the town of Laki, Plovdiv Province, the only settlement along its banks. The river flows into the Chepelarska reka at an altitude of 183 m at the Yugovo Inn on the second class II-86 road Plovdiv–Smolyan–Rudozem. Its largest tributary is the Sushitsa (24 km).

Its drainage basin covers a territory of 332 km^{2}, or 32.9% of the Chepelarska reka's total. The Yugovska reka has predominantly rain–snow feed with high water in May and low water in October. The average annual flow at the village of Yugovo is 6.27 m^{3}/s. Its waters are utilized for small-scale electricity generation and industrial water supply for the mining industry.

Perched above its right banks is the village of Manastir, one of the highest settlements in Bulgaria. A 15.7 km stretch of the third class III-861 road Yugovo Inn–Laki–Rozhen follows its valley.
