= Laki Municipality =

Coordinates: 42°50′N 24°50′E

Laki Municipality Община Лъки
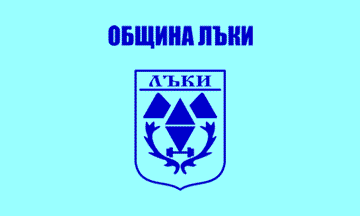
- Flag

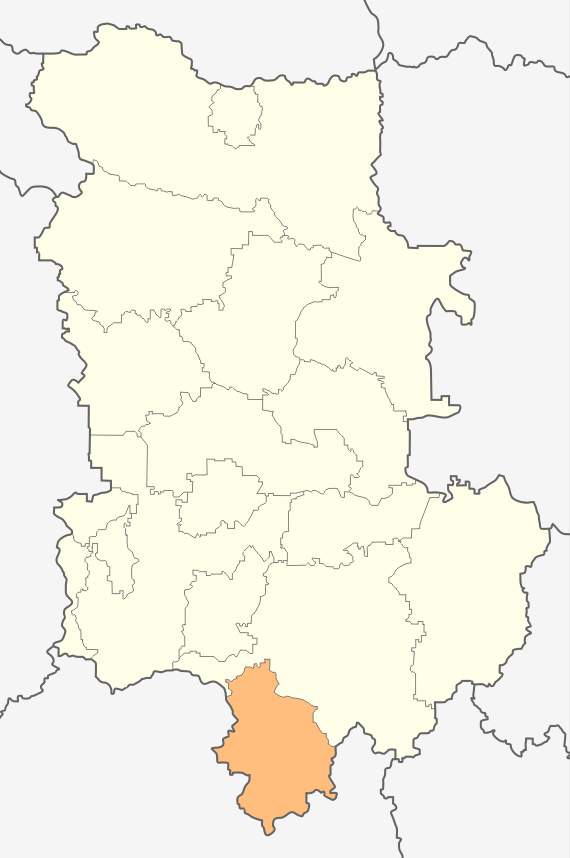
- Country: Bulgaria
- Province: Plovdiv Province
- Seat: Laki

Area
  - Total: 292.5 km^{2} (112.9 sq mi)

Population (2024)
  - Total: 2,043
  - Density: 6.985/km^{2} (18.09/sq mi)
- Website: www.oblaki.com/main.php

Laki Municipality (Bulgarian: Община Лъки) is a municipality in the south of Plovdiv Province, central Bulgaria. Covering a territory of 292.5 km^{2}, it is the tenth largest of the 18 municipalities in the province, encompassing 4.88% of its total area. It borders the municipalities of Asenovgrad to the north and northeast, Banite to the east and southeast, Smolyan to the south, and Chepelare to the west. All of them but Asenovgrad are part of the neighbouring Smolyan Province.

The municipal seat Laki is located 54 km south of the regional center Plovdiv, 36 km south of the town of Asenovgrad, and 88 km north of the town of Smolyan.

== Geography ==
The topography consists of medium and high-altitude mountain elevations. The whole municipal area lies within the northern slopes of the Rhodope Mountains. To the south and southeast spans the middle portion of the Perelik–Prespa division of the mountain range, where its highest point, the summit of Prespa (2,000 m) is located. There are several more ridges separated by the deep valleys of the rivers systems. To the north, in the valley of the river Chepelarska reka is the lowest point of the municipality at 435 m. The average altitude is 850 m.

Laki Municipality falls within the transitional continental climatic zone with strong mountainous influence. In its northernmost part flows a 5 km section of the Chepelarska reka, a right tributary of the Maritsa of the Aegean Sea basin. Almost all of its territory is drained by the Chepelarska’s right tributary the Yugovska reka and its constituting rivers the Sushitsa, the Belishka reka, and others.

== Transport ==
Laki Municipality is traversed by two roads of the national network with a total length of 51 km: the first 33.2 km of the third class III-861 road, and the first 17.8 km of the third class III-8611 road. With the addition of the local roads, the total municipal network reaches 131 km.

== Demography ==
The population is 2,043 as of 2024.

There are ten villages and one town in Laki Municipality:

- Balkan mahala
- Belitsa
- Borovo
- Chetroka
- Chukata
- Dryanovo
- Dzhurkovo
- Krushovo
- Laki
- Lukavitsa
- Manastir
- Yugovo
- Zdravets

== Gallery ==
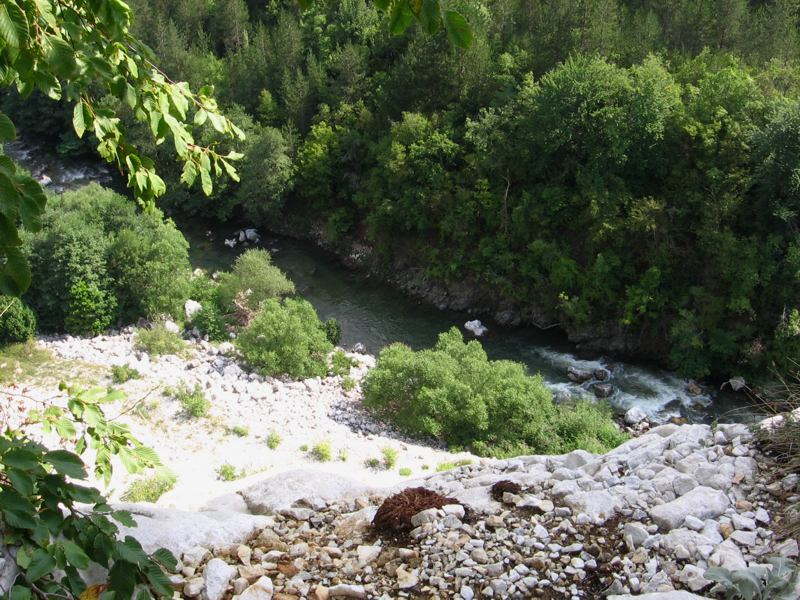
Yugovska reka

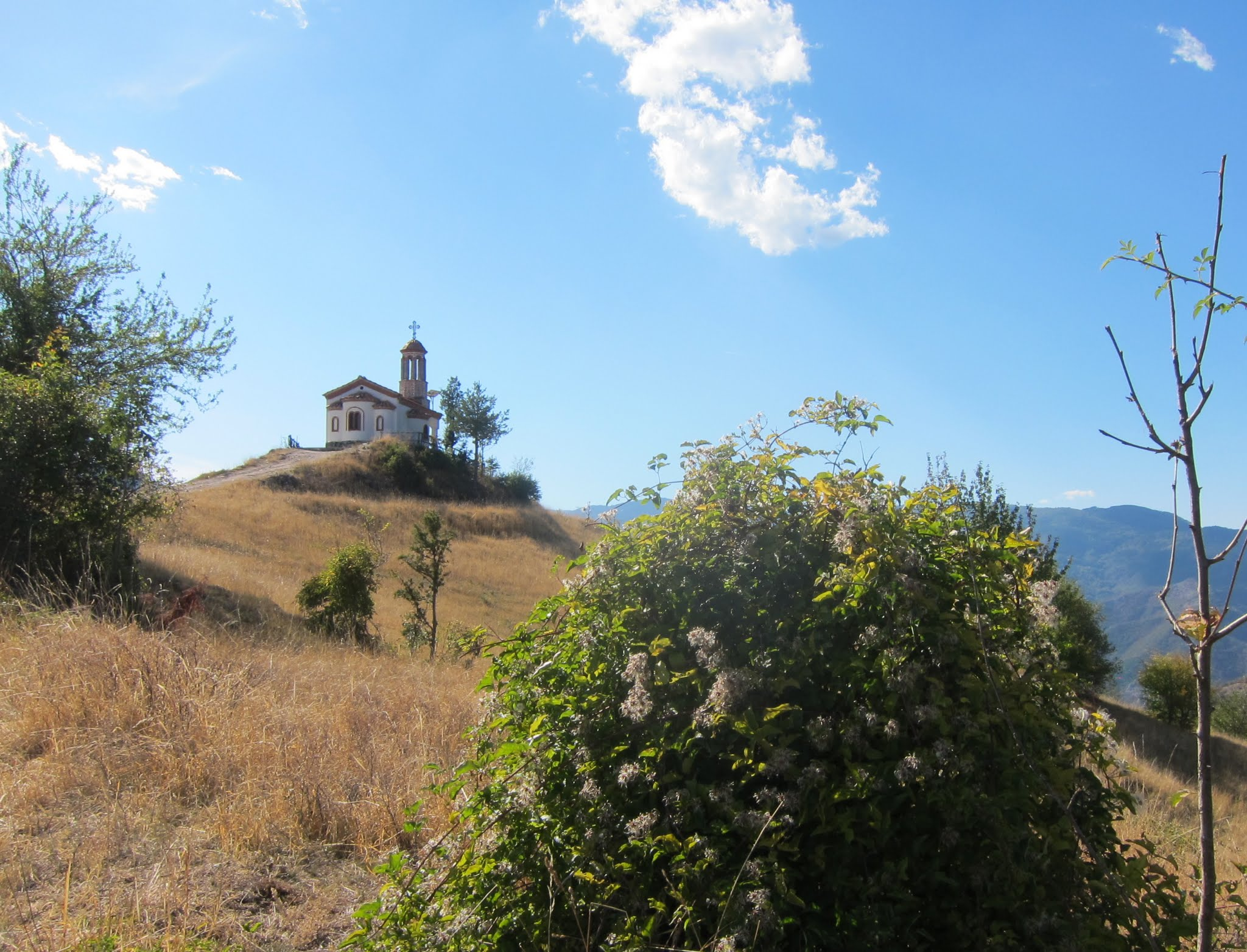
A chapel near Borovo

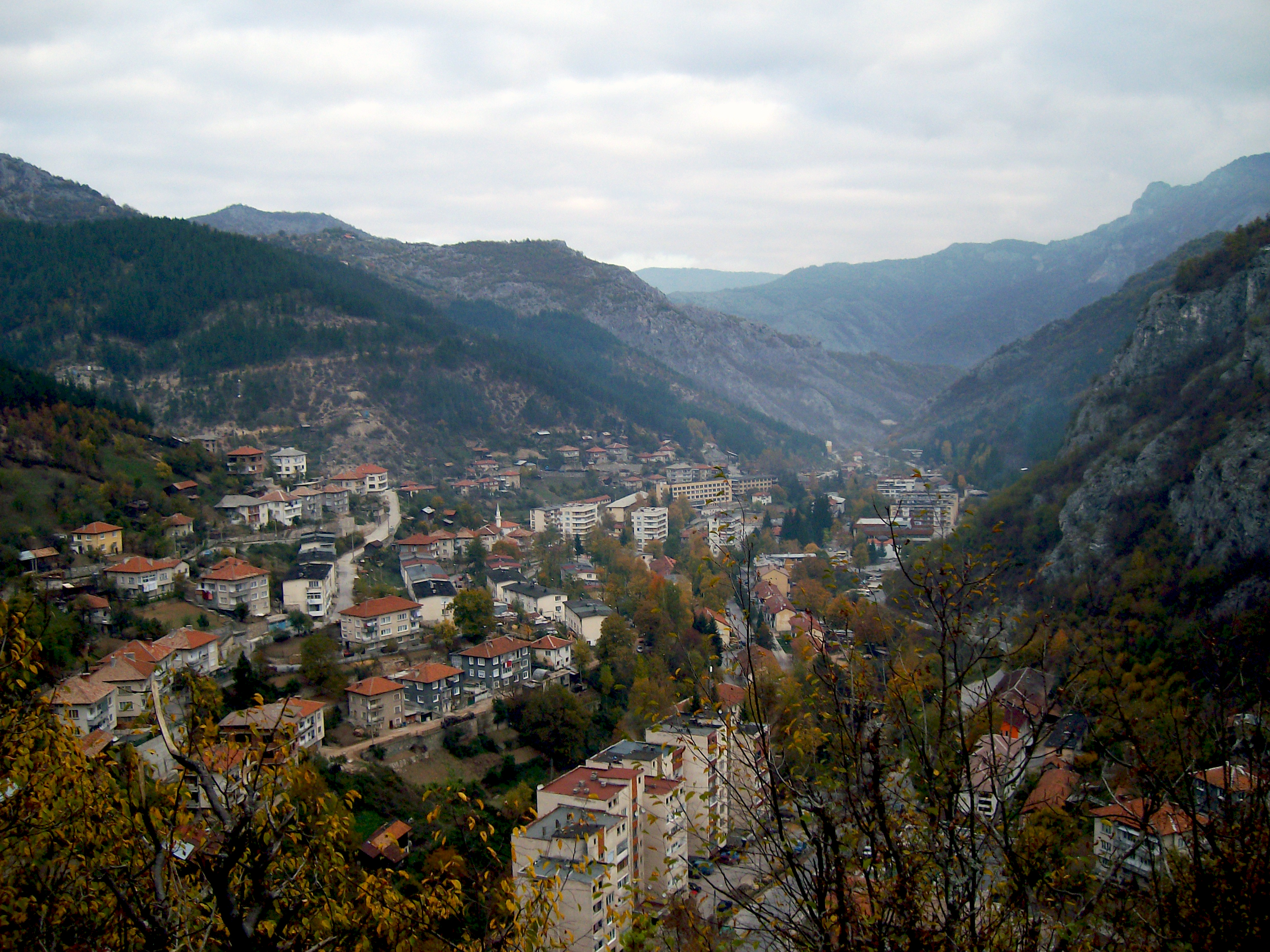
A view of Laki
