= Rozhen (Rhodope Mountains) =

Mountain pass in Smolyan Province, Bulgaria

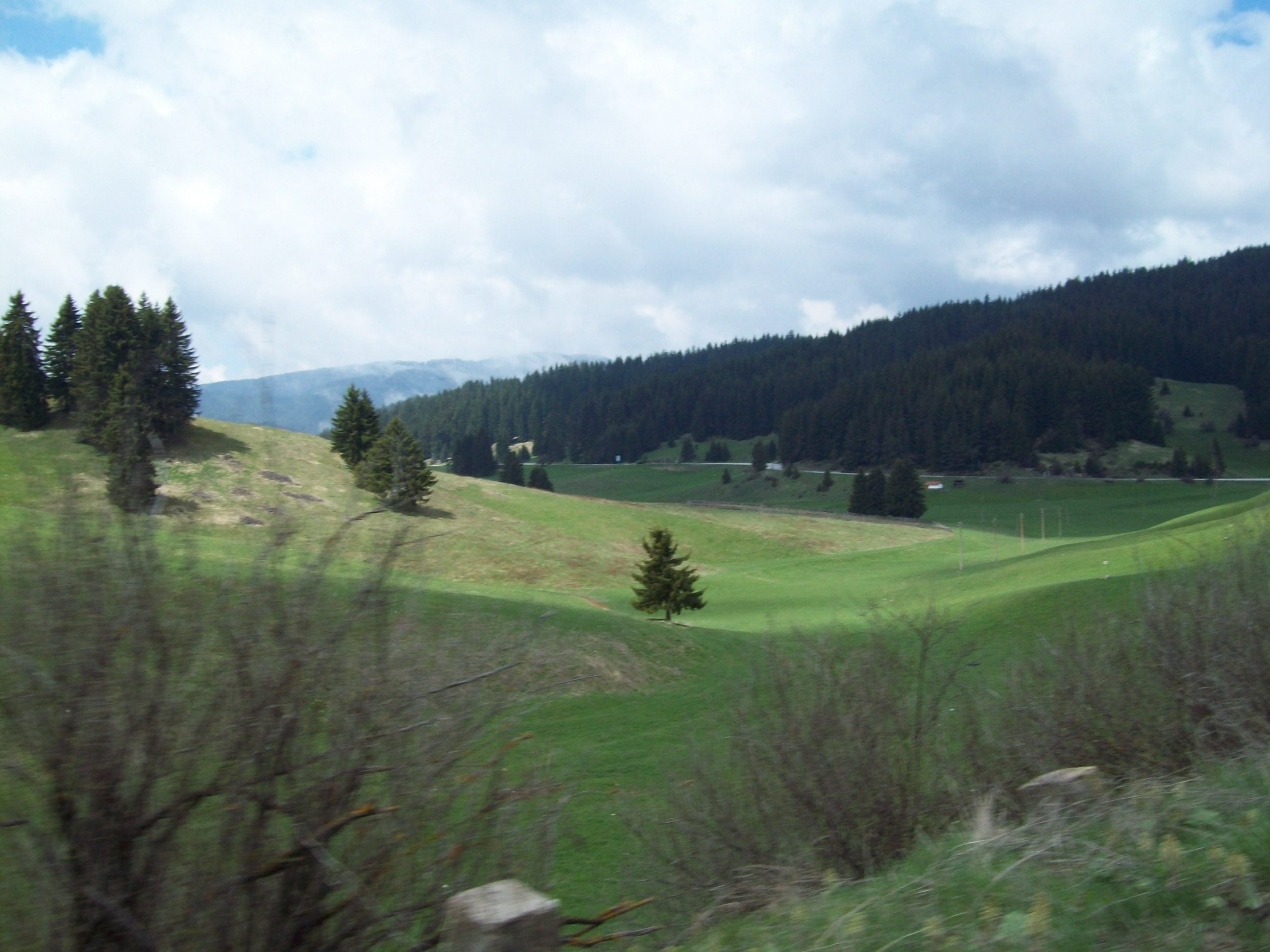
- Interactive map of Rozhen
- Elevation: 1,430 metres (4,690 ft)

Third Approach
- Location: Rhodope Mountains, Bulgaria
- Coordinates: 41°40′25″N 24°44′06″E

Rozhen is a mountain pass (saddle) in southern Bulgaria in the central part of the Perelik-Prespa division of the Western Rhodopes in the Smolyan Municipality, Smolyan District.

The pass is 11.2 kilometres (7.0 mi) long, and the altitude of the saddle is 1,436 metres (4,711 ft). It connects the valley of the Chepelarska Reka (right tributary of the Maritsa) in the northwest with the valley of the Byala Reka (left tributary of the Luda Reka and part of the Arda basin) in the southeast. It starts at 1350 m above sea level. west of the village of Progled, at the junction for the Pamporovo resort, and heads southeast, up the slope of the Pereliksko-Prespa division of the Western Rhodopes. After 3.2 km, it climbs to the saddle at 1436 m above sea level, from where a dark and many-turning descent along the south-eastern slope of the ridge begins. After 8 km (5 mi), it descends to the village of Sokolovtsi, where it ends at 1,046 metres (3,432 ft) above sea level.

The saddle is occupied by extensive meadows and pastures, surrounded by flat ridges overgrown with coniferous vegetation. From a geomorphological point of view, it is of karst origin; its base is made of marbleized limestone, and it is a drainless marble karst valley. The powerful Western Rhodope Hills, Chernatitsa and Radyuva Planina, diverge from it in the northwest and north directions.

Since ancient times, the saddle has been an important passage between the Upper Thracian lowland and the valley of the Arda River and the White Sea. Now a section of 11.2 kilometres (7.0 mi) (from km 85.9 to km 97.1) of the second-class Republic Road II-86 Plovdiv-Smolyan-Rudozem border crossing passes through the pass (the last part of the project). To the left of the saddle, from the northeast comes the last section of the third-class Republican road III-861 from Yugovsko Hanche, the city of Laki, and the village of Djurkovo. Due to the important transport and economic importance of the pass, the road through it is maintained year-round for the passage of motor vehicles.

On the meadows of the saddle in the past, folklore assemblies were regularly held, which have been resumed for several years (the last edition was held in July 2016). The largest Bulgarian observatory was built on Sveti Duh peak, north of the saddle. It has several telescopes, the largest of which has a diameter of 2 metres (6 ft 7 in).

== Miscellaneous ==
Rozhensky Prohod is the name given to a street in the "Strelbishte" district in Sofia
