= Tatoul of Marash =

Armenian ruler of Marash in the late 11th century

Tatoul of Marash (Note: Armenian: Թաթուլ, romanized: T’at’ul; Greek: Τατούλλις; also spelled Thatoul and Thathoul.) (fl. late 11th – early 12th century) was the Armenian lord of Marash from some point after the death of Philaretos Brachamios in 1090 until 1104. He was a Greek Orthodox Armenian, and his seals identify him as a member of the Pakourianoi, a Byzantine noble family of Armeno-Georgian origin. According to Steven Runciman, he hosted the main army of the First Crusade while it was passing through Marash in 1097 and was confirmed in his authority as a Byzantine vassal. According to other scholars, he was first appointed as governor of Marash in 1097 or 1099. Although he successfully resisted the attacks of Bohemond of Taranto, he was finally forced to cede Marash to Joscelin of Courtenay in 1104. After this, he settled in Constantinople.

== Biography ==
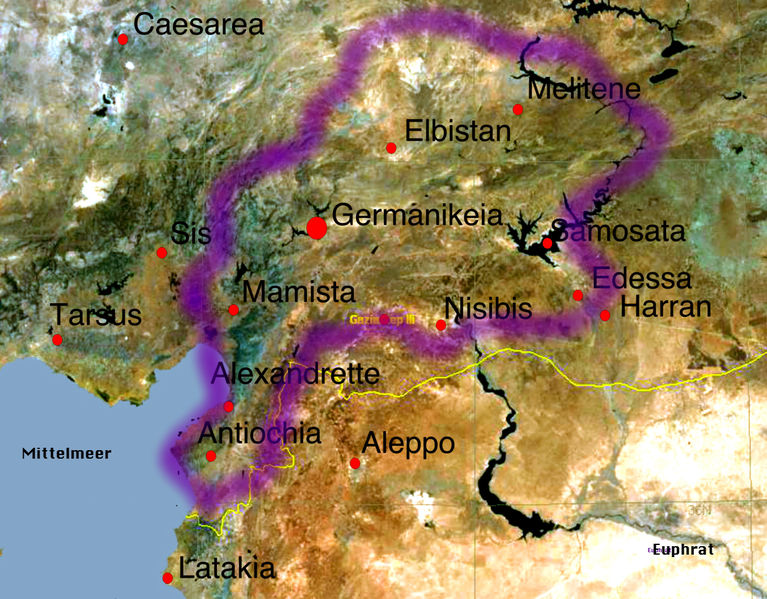
State controlled by Philaretos. Tatoul controlled the region around Marash (Germanikeia)

Direct information about Tatoul comes from the 12th-century Armenian chronicle of Matthew of Edessa and from Tatoul's own seals, which bear inscriptions in Greek. Tatoul may have been one of the Armenian lieutenants of Philaretos Brachamios who came to control parts of the latter's principality after its collapse, which had already occurred by the time of Philaretos's death in 1090. Steven Runciman writes that Tatoul, "formerly a Byzantine official," was already ruler of Marash when the army of the First Crusade arrived there in October 1097; he hosted the Crusaders for a few days and was confirmed in his authority as a Byzantine governor. Jean-Claude Cheynet disagrees with Runciman and states that Marash was either in the hands of the children of Philaretos or of a Turkish garrison when the Crusaders arrived there in 1097, and that in the same year the Byzantine general Tatikios appointed Tatoul, "a friend of the Empire", to govern Marash in the Emperor's name. According to V. P. Stepanenko and V. S. Shandrovskaya, Marash may have been handed over by the Crusaders to a representative of the Byzantines in 1097, but it is unlikely that it was held for long. In their view, Tatoul could not have ruled Marash in the name of the Byzantine emperor earlier than late 1099, when Marash again came under Byzantine control. (Note: As for Tatoul's whereabouts before 1099, Stepanenko and Shandrovskaya present two versions they consider equally plausible: 1) Tatoul served under Philaretos and remained for some time as a private citizen after the fall of Philaretos's power in Marash, becoming governor after the reestablishment of Byzantine power there; or, 2) Tatoul arrived in Marash along with the army of Boutoumites and Monastra at the end of 1099.)

Like Philaretos, Tatoul was Greek Orthodox, contrary to the majority of his countrymen who were Armenian Orthodox, and, having been a former Byzantine official, was more aligned with the Byzantine Empire than neighbouring Armenian principalities such as the ones of Constantine I, son of Roupen or Kogh Vasil. Seals ordered by Tatoul have been preserved which identify him as a member of the Pakourianoi, a Byzantine noble family of Armeno-Georgian origin. In the seals he is called protonobelissimos and archon ton archonton ("archon of archons"); the latter corresponds to the title attributed to him by the Armenian chronicle Matthew of Edessa: ishkhanats ishkhan ("prince of princes"). Tatoul could have received the title protonobelissimos at the end of the 1180s, when the Byzantine emperor Alexios I Komnenos reformed the hierarchy of noble titles. The title archon ton archonton was not in the Byzantine table of ranks and was formerly only accorded to foreign rulers, namely the Bagratid kings of Armenia. It is unclear whether the title archon ton archonton was now being used as a Byzantine administrative title or entered use during the time of Philaretos's rule (in which case Tatoul could have received the title from Philaretos). It may be a calque of Armenian ishkhanats ishkhan and thus connected with Bagratid Armenia.

In 1100 Bohemond of Taranto, a former member of the First Crusade who had founded his own principality at Antioch in 1099, occupied the area around Marash and may have captured the town itself; however, in August 1100 Bohemond and his nephew Richard were captured by the Turks during the same campaign, and Marash returned to Tatoul's control. Emperor Alexios I sent a force commanded by the generals Boutoumites and Monastros against Antioch. According to Cheynet and George T. Beech, this expedition occurred in 1104; Stepanenko and Shandrovskaya place this expedition at the end of 1099. The Byzantine army stopped in Marash, where Monastros remained for a short while. After Monastros was recalled, Tatoul was left in control of Marash. Later in 1104 he was finally forced to cede Marash to Joscelin of Courtenay, ruler of Turbessel (Tell Bashir) and vassal of Count Baldwin of Edessa. The surrender of the town, described in unclear terms by Matthew of Edessa, "evidently occurred without a struggle." According to George T. Beech, Tatoul was endangered by the withdrawal of the Byzantine force and another Turkish offensive; thus, he probably decided to cede Marash to a relatively friendly vassal of the count of Edessa rather than to the hostile rulers of Antioch. After this, Tatoul settled in Constantinople. The discovery of one of his seals in the area of Bachkovo Monastery, founded by Gregory Pakourianos, may suggest that he continued his service in the Byzantine administrative system and maintained links with the monastery founded by his kinsman.

== Identification as father-in-law of Baldwin I ==
E. Honigmann and some other scholars identify Tatoul with the father of the Armenian woman (unnamed in the primary sources but called Arda in some sources since the 18th century) who became the second wife of Baldwin of Boulogne. In the chronicle of Albert of Aix, the father of Baldwin's Armenian wife is called "Taphnuz" and is identified as the brother of Constantine of Gargar. William of Tyre renders the name as "Tafroc", while Michael the Syrian calls him "Tabtoug". As evidence for this claim, it has been cited that Baldwin's wife asked for leave to join her family in Constantinople after Baldwin set her aside in 1104, the same year that Tatoul settled in Constantinople. Édouard Dulaurier, followed by Heinrich Hagenmeyer, concluded that "Taphnuz" was a brother of Constantine I, the Armenian lord of Cilicia, called Toros, although no brother of Constantine by that name is known, and according to Steven Runciman it is clear that Albert of Aix was referring to Constantine of Gargar, not Constantine of Cilicia. Gérard Dédéyan argues that Baldwin's father-in-law was Dawtouk (whence the form "Taphnuz" and other variations), brother of Constantine of Gargar, who promoted the match.

== See also ==
- Lordship of Marash
- Thoros of Edessa
- Gabriel of Melitene
