= Pakourianos =

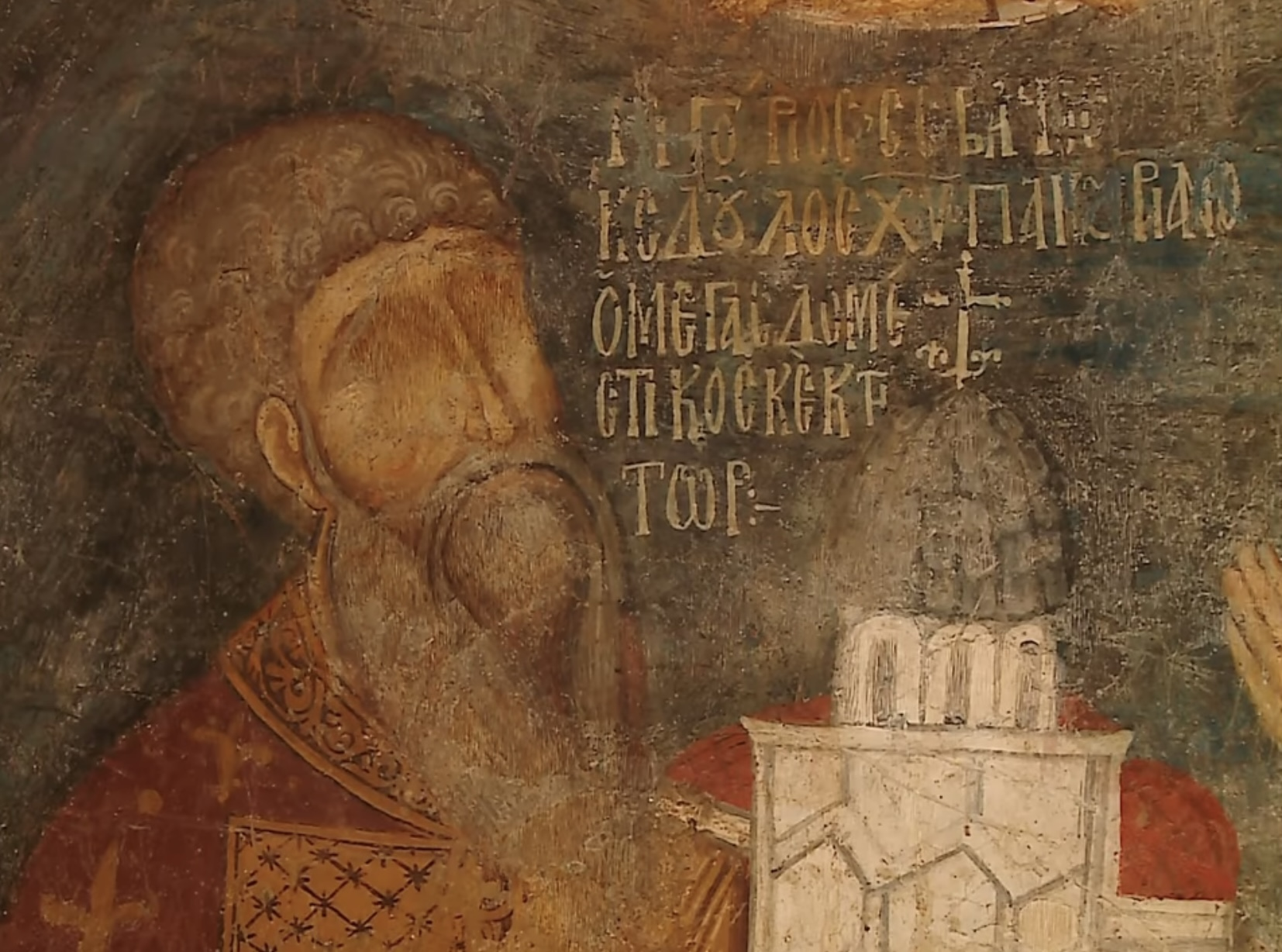
Fresco of Gregory Pakourianos at Bachkovo Monastery

Pakourianos (Note: Greek: Πακουριανός, pl. Pakourianoi; Armenian: Բակուրեան, romanized: Bakurean; Georgian: ბაკურიანი, romanized: Bakuriani) was a Byzantine noble family of Armeno-Georgian origin. They held important administrative positions in the Byzantine Empire until the 13th century.

== History ==
Members of the family first appear as part of the army of Kouropalates David III of Tao. David, a scion of the Bagratid dynasty, ruled over the border district of Tao from 966 to 1000, and his "bicultural Armeno-Iberian court" was one of the significant cultural centers of the period. His lands were annexed by the Byzantines after his death. As related by the Armenian historian Stepanos Asoghik, Pakourianos (Bakuran in Armenian), called the "prince of princes" (ishkhanats ishkhan), was in David's army during his siege of Khlat in 988. Pakourianos' subsequent fate is recorded by the Byzantine historian John Skylitzes. The Byzantine emperor Basil II took with him Pakourianos and other leading Iberian nobles, including the brothers Theudatos and Pherses (the wording leaves it unclear whether these were also Pakourianos's brothers). Pakourianos received the title of patrician and was appointed strategos of Samos. Theudatos was also named patrician and count of the Opsikion Theme.

The most famous member of the family is Gregory Pakourianos, son of the aforementioned Pakourianos. According to his own account, Gregory was left without an inheritance after the death of his father, since his mother used the family's wealth for her daughters' dowries. He travelled around Armenia, Iberia, and Syria before entering Byzantine service. He was sent to the empire's eastern frontier, where he served in the area of Kars and Theodosiopolis. He participated in the defense of Ani against the Seljuks in 1064. His career as an imperial doux in the eastern provinces was ended by the Seljuk conquests. He supported the coup of Alexios I Komnenos, who appointed him megas domestikos in the western part of the empire, and bestowed upon him the title of sebastos. He also received significant estates in the Balkans. Gregory founded a Georgian monastery at Petritzos (now the Bachkovo Monastery in Bulgaria) and patronized the monastery of Iveron on Mount Athos. Gregory fought against the Norman invaders in the Balkans and died in battle against the Pechenegs in 1086. Gregory's grandson, also named Gregory, married the niece of Emperor Alexios I, and received a governorship in the Balkans. Tatoul, who ruled Marash (Germanikeia) in the name of the Emperor until 1104, is identified as a Pakourianos in his seals and bore the title of archon ton archonton ("archon of archons", corresponding to the Armenian ishkhanats ishkhan). Other members of the family held important administrative positions in the Byzantine Empire until the 13th century.

== Origin and identity ==
Gregory Pakourianos is variously called an Armenian and an Iberian in the primary sources. The typikon for his monastery was written in Greek, Georgian, and Armenian, and he signed the text in "Armenian characters" while calling himself an Iberian. These facts have made the issue of the origin of the Pakourianoi the subject of scholarly debate. Historian Nina Garsoïan writes, "The most likely explanation is that [the Pakourianoi] belonged to the mixed Armeno-Iberian Chalcedonian aristocracy, which dwelt in the border district of Tayk῾/Tao." Alexander Kazhdan states that the difference between Georgians and Armenians of the Chalcedonian confession was "not unbridgeable, especially in the region of Taiq" and notes that some Byzantine subjects spoke and wrote both Georgian and Armenian, in addition to Greek. According to the scholars V. P. Stepanenko and V. S. Shandrovskaya, evidence from the seals left behind by members of the family indicates that their ethnocultural identity was "far more complex than proponents of a strictly Georgian or Armenian origin had assumed." The names recorded on these seals, such as Apas, Aspiet, Mouselios, and Tatoul, along with the family's apparent claims of descent from the Arsacids, indicate that they had not yet forgotten their Armenian background. Though he himself was Eastern Orthodox, some of Gregory's relatives with were Armenian Apostolic, for which reason he sought a chrysobull permitting him to transfer property to them. Nevertheless, a significant part of the family converted to Eastern Orthodoxy and became culturally Georgian.

== Bibliography ==
- Garsoïan, Nina (1997). "The Independent Kingdoms of Medieval Armenia". In Hovannisian, Richard G. (ed.). The Armenian People from Ancient to Modern Times. Vol. 1. New York: St. Martin's Press. pp. 143–185. ISBN 0-312-10169-4.
- —— (2005) [Orig. print publication: 1991]. "Pakourianos". In Kazhdan, Alexander P. (ed.). The Oxford Dictionary of Byzantium. Oxford University Press. ISBN 9780195187922.
- Kazhdan, Alexander P. (1975). Armiane v sostave gospodstvuiushchego klassa Vizantiĭskoĭ imperii v XI-XII vv Армяне в составе господствующего класса Византийской Империи в XI-XII вв. [Armenians in the composition of the ruling class of Byzantium in the 11th–12th centuries] (in Russian). Yerevan: Izdatelʹstvo AN Armianskoiĭ SSR. LCCN 78414300. OCLC 53117449.
- —— (1984). "The Armenians in the Byzantine Ruling Class Predominantly in the Ninth through Twelfth Centuries". In Samuelian, Thomas J.; Stone, Michael E. (eds.). Medieval Armenian Culture. Chico, CA: Scholars Press. pp. 439–451. ISBN 0-89130-642-0.
- Skylitzes, John (2010). A Synopsis of Byzantine History, 811–1057. Translated by John Wortley. Cambridge University Press. ISBN 978-0-521-76705-7.
- Stepanenko, V. P. (2001). "Pakuriany v Vizantii. K debatam ob ėtnicheskoĭ prinadlezhnosti t.n. armiano-ivirskikh familiĭ" Пакурианы в Византии. К дебатам об этнической принадлежности т.н. армяно-ивирских фамилий [Pakourianoi in Byzantium. On the debates about the ethnic belonging of the so-called Armeno-Iberian families]. Khristianskiĭ Vostok (in Russian) (2): 255–276. LCCN 00237230. OCLC 43208323.
- ——; Shandrovskaya, V. S. (2005). "Tatul i Pakuriany" Татул и Пакурианы [Tatul and the Pakourianoi]. Antichnaia drevnostʹ i srednie veka (in Russian). 36: 171–193. ISSN 0320-4472.
- Varzos, Konstantinos (1984). Hē genealogia tōn Komnēnōn Η Γενεαλογία των Κομνηνών [The genealogy of the Komnenoi] (PDF). Vol. A1. Centre for Byzantine Studies, University of Thessaloniki. OCLC 994706592.
