= Roozen =

Roozen is a surname. Notable people with the surname include:

- Annette Roozen (born 1976), Dutch paraplegic track and field athlete
- Nico Roozen (born 1953), Dutch economist
- Niek Roozen (born 1997), Dutch actor

== See also ==
- Rozen
