= Cherna (Arda) =

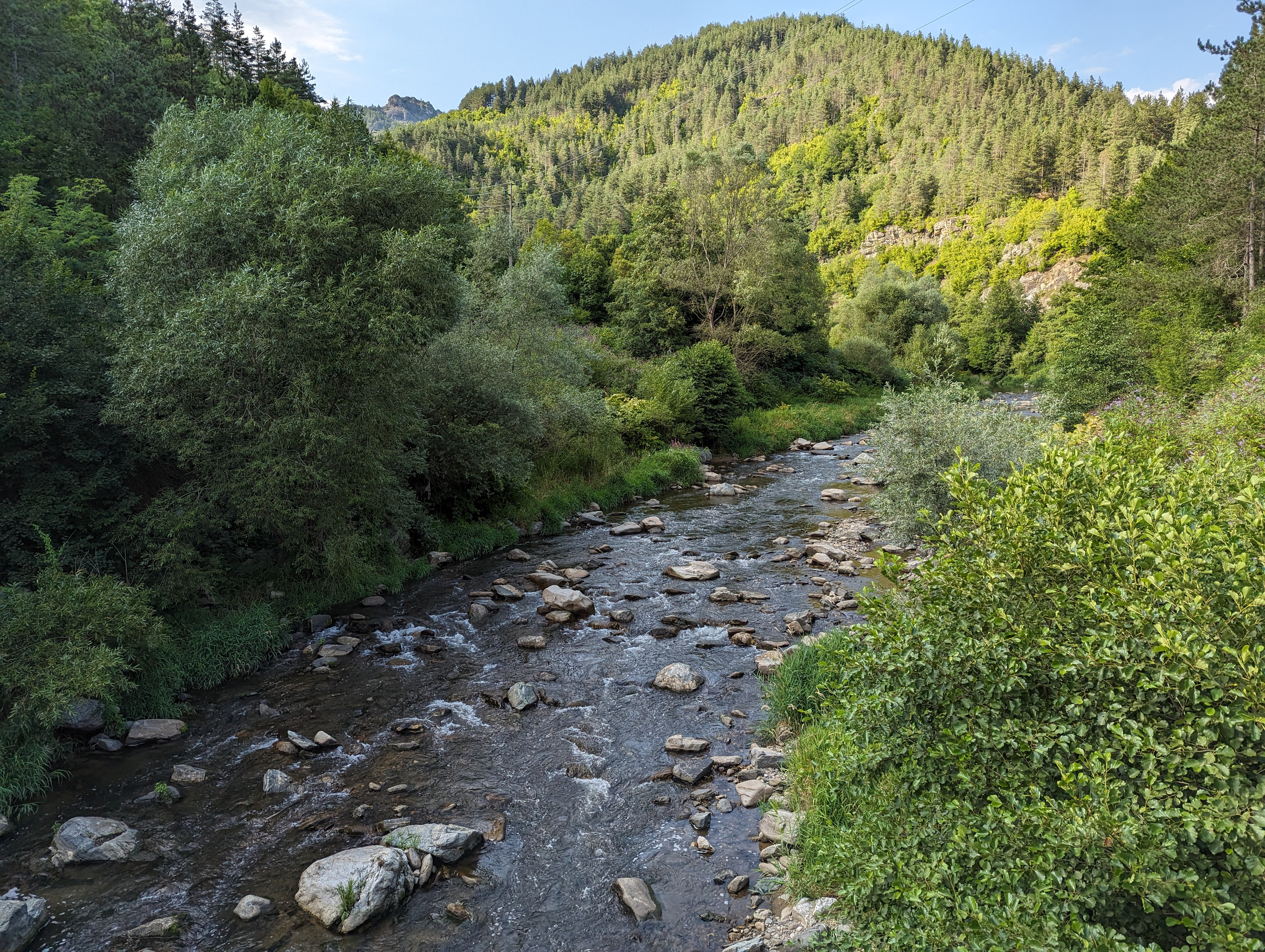

Location
- Country: Bulgaria

Physical characteristics
- Source
  - location: SE of Mugla, Rhodope Mountains
  - coordinates: 41°34′13.08″N 24°31′28.92″E
  - elevation: 1,770 m (5,810 ft)
- Mouth
  - location: Arda→ Maritsa→ Aegean Sea
  - coordinates: 41°32′6″N 24°55′55.92″E
  - elevation: 624 m (2,047 ft)
- Length: 48 km (30 mi)
- Basin size: 259 km^{2} (100 sq mi)

The Cherna (Bulgarian: Черна) is a 48 km long river in southern Bulgaria, a left tributary of the Arda of the Maritsa drainage.

The source of the river is the westernmost point of the whole Arda basin and springs in the Pereliksko–Prespanski Ridge of the western Rhodope Mountains at an altitude of 1,770 m, some 5 km southeast west of the village of Mugla. Throughout its course it flows eastwards in a narrow canyon-like valley, with a single wide section at the town of Smolyan. It flows into the Arda at an altitude of 128 m about 800 m south of the village of Leshtak. It drains the southeastern slopes of the highest section of the Pereliksko–Prespanski Ridge and the northern slopes of the Kaynadinski Ridge.

Its drainage basin covers a territory of 259 km^{2}, or 4.47% of the Arda's total. The river has predominantly rain–snow feed with high water in April–May and low water in December–January and August–September. The average annual flow at the village of Taran is 4.86 m^{3}/s.

The Cherna flows entirely in Smolyan Province. There are seven settlements along its course, one town and six villages — the town of Smolyan and the villages of Vlahovo, Laka, Podvis, Rovina and Taran in Smolyan Municipality, and the village of Ravnishta in Madan Municipality. The river provides potable water for Smolyan.

There are two main roads along its valley, a 16.8 km section of the second class II-86 road Plovdiv–Smolyan–Rudozem and a 9 km stretch of the third class III-866 road Smolyan–Devin–Stamboliyski.
