= II-86 road (Bulgaria) =

Road in Bulgaria

Republic Road I-86
- Републикански път I-86

Route information
- Length: 147.4 km (91.6 mi)

Major junctions
- From: Km 220.8 of I-8, Plovdiv
- To: Bulgaria–Greece border south of Rudozem; Road 55 in Greece

Location
- Country: Bulgaria
- Towns: Plovdiv, Asenovgrad, Chepelare, Smolyan, Rudozem

Highway system
- Highways in Bulgaria

Republican Road II-86 (Bulgarian: Републикански път II-86) is a 2nd class road in Bulgaria, running in general direction north–south through the territory of Plovdiv and Smolyan Provinces. Its length is 147.4 km.

== Route description ==
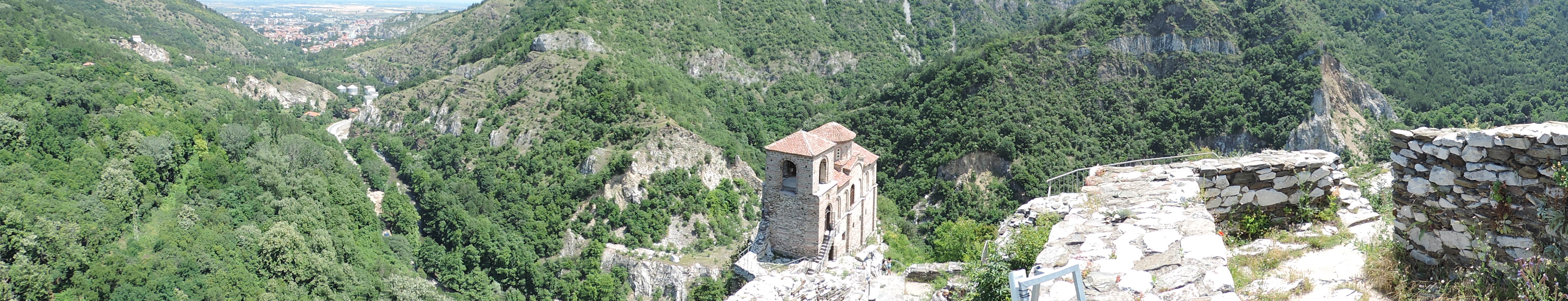
Panoramic view with Asen's Fortress, the Church of the Holy Mother of God and the road II-86 seen in the valley of Chepelarska reka to the left

The road starts in the Upper Thracian Plain at Km 220.8 of the first class I-8 road west of the city of Plovdiv and immediately crosses the river Maritsa, heading initially south and then east, serving for 14 km as a ring road of Plovdiv. It then turns southeast in an upgraded 10 km four-lane stretch to the town of Asenovgrad, where it intersects with the second class II-58 road. After the town, the road enters the Rhodope Mountains through the valley of the river Chepelarska reka, passing near Asen's Fortress and Bachkovo Monastery, and following the valley for 59.3 km through the villages of Bachkovo, Narechenski Bani and Hvoyna, as well as through the town of Chepelare.

At the intersection for the Pamporovo ski resort it passes through the Rozhen Saddle (1,430 m) and after a steep descent to the village of Sokolovtsi it reaches the valley of Byala reka, a tributary of the Cherna. From there, the II-86 continues south through the Byala reka valley, passing through the village of Bostina and reaching the Ustovo neighbourhood of the city of Smolyan. From Ustovo the road turns east and for 16.8 km follows the valley of the Cherna through the villages of Vlahovo, Podvis, Rovina, Taran and Ravnishta, then turns south through Srednogortsi, crosses a short watershed and enters the valley of the river Arda. The road follows the valley upstream to the town of Rudozem and then through the valley of the river Chepinska reka it ascends to the Bulgaria–Greece border and the border checkpoint Rudozem–Xanthi, where it meets Greek National Road 55.
