= Rozen =

Rozen may refer to:

- Anna Rozen, French writer, best known for her short stories
- Issi Rozen, Israeli-born jazz guitarist living in Boston, Massachusetts
- Minna Rozen (born 1947), professor emeritus at the Department of Jewish History at the University of Haifa
- Rima Rozen, Canadian geneticist
- Roman Rozen (1847–1921), diplomat in the service of the Russian Empire
- Shimshon Rozen (1952–2011), Israeli Air Force weapon systems officer, colonel in the Israeli Defense Forces
- Zvi Rozen (born 1947), Israeli former international footballer

== See also ==
- Rozen-e-Deewar, the first album recorded by Pakistani music band Rox3n
- Rozen Maiden, Japanese manga series written and illustrated by Peach-Pit
- Roze (disambiguation)
- Rozendal
- Rozenite
- Rozental
- Rozhen (disambiguation)
