= Sushitsa (river) =

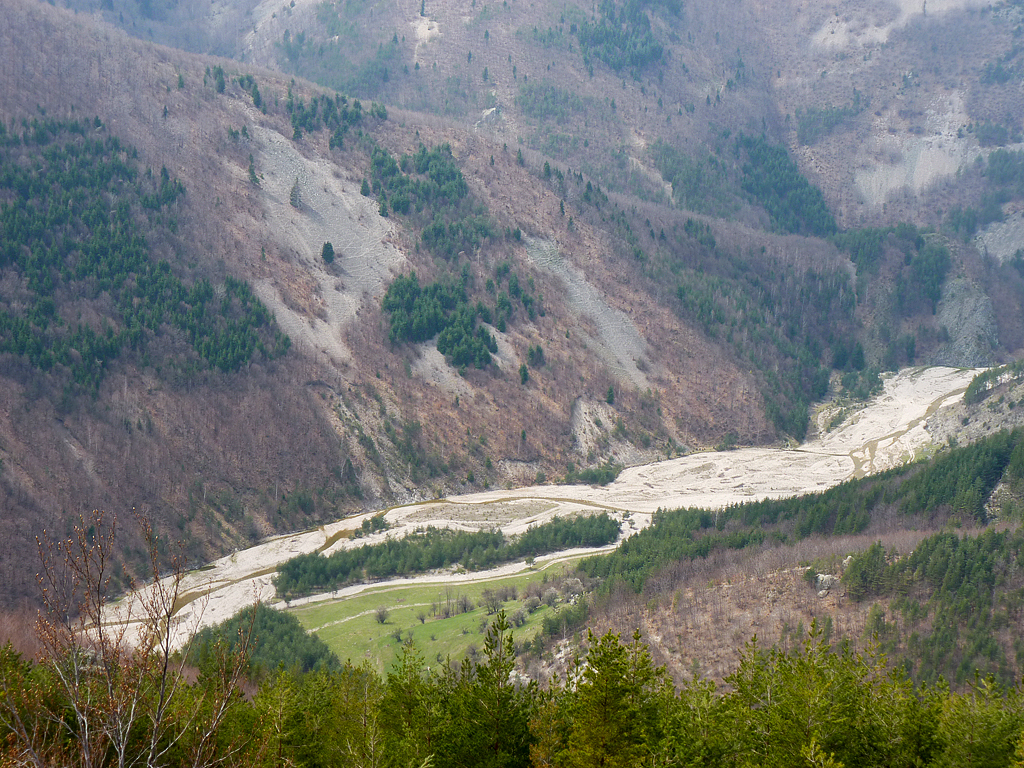

Location
- Country: Bulgaria

Physical characteristics
- Source
  - location: W of Sini Vrah, Rhodope Mountains
  - coordinates: 41°50′49.92″N 25°0′54″E
  - elevation: 1,425 m (4,675 ft)
- Mouth
  - location: Yugovska reka
  - coordinates: 41°52′32.16″N 24°49′15.96″E
  - elevation: 556 m (1,824 ft)
- Length: 24 km (15 mi)
- Basin size: 62 km^{2} (24 sq mi)

Basin features
- Progression: Yugovska reka→ Chepelarska reka→ Maritsa

The Sushitsa (Bulgarian: Сушица) is a 24 km long river in southern Bulgaria, flowing through Smolyan and Plovdiv Provinces. It is a right tributary of the Yugovska reka, itself a right tributary of the Chepelarska reka of the Maritsa basin.

The river springs at an altitude of 1,425 m at the western foothills of the summit of Sini Vrah (1,536 m) in the Dobrostan Ridge of the western Rhodope Mountains. It flows in direction west–northwest in a narrow deep valley with numerous rocky escarpments and caves. The river flows into the Yugovska reka at an altitude of 556 m some 1.7 km southeast of the village of Yugovo. It drains the northwesternmost slopes of the Prespanski Ridge and the southwestern slopes of the Dobrostan Ridge.

Its drainage basin covers a territory of 62 km^{2}, or 18.7% of the Yugovska reka's total. The Sushitsa has predominantly rain–snow feed with high water in May and low water in August.

The river flows entirely in Plovdiv Province. There are two settlements along its course, the villages of Sini Vrah and Mostovo in Asenovgrad Municipality. Most of the river falls within the boundaries of the Chervenata Stena Reserve and fishing is forbidden. Raising over its high right banks north of Sini Vrah is located the plateau of Belintash, assumed to be an ancient Thracian cult site.
