= Rozhen =

Rozhen (Bulgarian: Рожен) may refer to:

- Rozhen, Bulgaria, a village in Sandanski municipality, Blagoevgrad Province, Bulgaria
  - Rozhen Monastery, located nearby
- Rozhen, an area in the Rhodope Mountains, in Smolyan municipality, Smolyan Province, Bulgaria
  - Rozhen National Folklore Fair, organized in the area
  - Rozhen Observatory, located nearby
    - 6267 Rozhen, an asteroid named after the observatory
