= Aegean Pass =

- Elidzhe
- Location within Balkans
- Elevation: 1,010 metres (3,310 ft)
- Traversed by: II-86 road (Bulgaria)

Third Approach
- Location: Bulgaria, Greece
- Range: Rhodope Mountains
- Coordinates: 41.4002°N 24.8299°E

The Aegean Pass (Bulgarian: Беломорски проход, Belomorski prohod) or Elidzhe (Елидже) is a mountain pass between the central and eastern Rhodope Mountains. It connects Smolyan Province in south central Bulgaria with Xanthi regional unit of Eastern Macedonia and Thrace in northeastern Greece. As one of three passes between the Rhodope highlands and the Aegean coast of Western Thrace, it links the upper valleys of the Chepinska reka to the north and the Kompsatos to the south. The highest point of the pass is at 1,010 m (3,310 ft) above sea level on the Bulgarian-Greek border, where Bulgarian road II-86 meets Greek National Road 55.

Until the end of World War II, the Aegean Pass was actively used for commerce. It was closed in 1944, as Bulgaria and Greece ended up on different sides of the Iron Curtain. In the 2020s, the roads from Rudozem and Dimario on either side of the pass were rebuilt to a modern standard and a new border checkpoint was established. In December 2024, plans were announced to reopen the Aegean Pass for vehicular traffic without border controls via the Rudozem–Xanthi border crossing on 1 January 2025, coinciding with Bulgaria's full entry into the Schengen Area. Construction delays on the Greek side postponed the opening of the road for vehicular traffic. The pass was opened for passenger and light commercial traffic (vehicles up to 3.5 t) on 20 January 2026 after the completion of road works on Greek National Road 55.

The opening of the pass for traffic is expected to bolster tourism in the region, providing quick access between the Pamporovo ski resort near Smolyan and the Aegean beaches of Xanthi.
