= Greek National Road 55 =

Trunk road in Greece

National Road 55
- Εθνική Οδός 55
- Route of the EO55 road, in blue

Route information
- Length: 42.4 km (26.3 mi)
- Existed: 9 July 1963–present

Major junctions
- South end: Xanthi
- North end: Border with Bulgaria (Aegean Pass)

Location
- Country: Greece
- Regions: Eastern Macedonia and Thrace
- Primary destinations: Xanthi; Echinos; Border with Bulgaria (Aegean Pass)

Highway system
- Highways in Greece; Motorways; National roads
← EO54	→ EO56

Greek National Road 55 (Greek: Εθνική Οδός 55), abbreviated as the EO55, is a national road in northern Greece. The EO55 runs within the Xanthi regional unit, from Xanthi to the border crossing with Bulgaria at the Aegean Pass near Dimario: however, the section between Dimario and the border with Bulgaria did not open until January 2026.

== Route ==
The EO55 is officially defined as a north–south road within the Xanthi regional unit: the EO55 branches off the EO14 at Gorgona near Xanthi, and heads north to the border with Bulgaria near Dimario, passing through Echinos. At the border, it meets the Bulgarian II-86 road.

== History ==
Ministerial Decision G25871 of 9 July 1963 created the EO55 from the old EO47, which existed by royal decree from 1955 until 1963, and followed the same route as the current EO55. The border crossing itself opened on 20 January 2026, shortly after Bulgaria fully joined the Schengen Area.
