= Siege of Ani (1064) =

Battle of the Byzantine–Seljuq wars

- Part of Byzantine–Seljuk wars
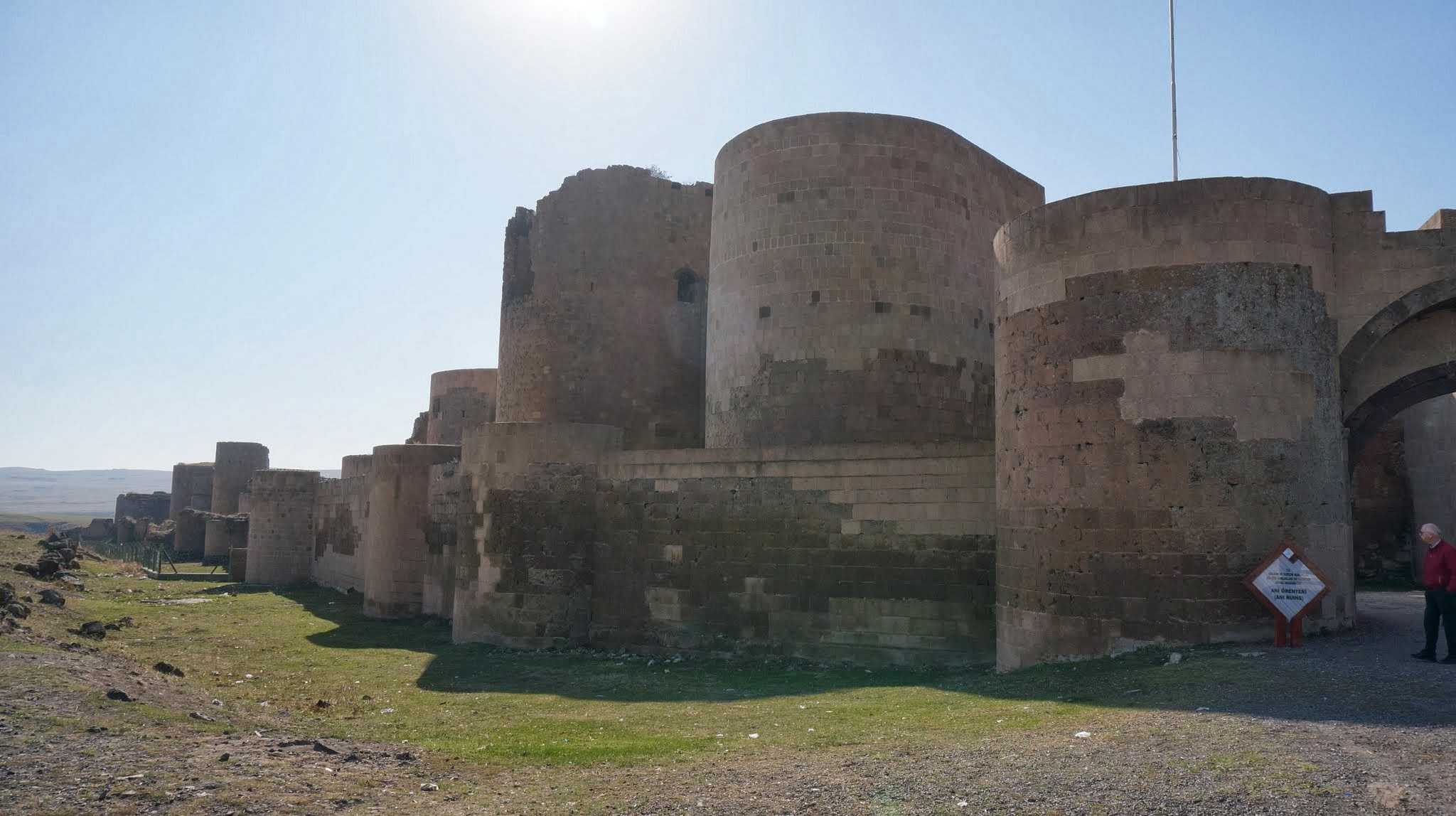
- Ani walls
Date	July – 16 August 1064
Location	Ani, Kars (Modern day)
Result	Seljuk victory

Belligerents
Byzantine Empire	Seljuk Empire

Commanders and leaders
Duke Bagrat; Gregory Pakourianos	Alp Arslan; Nizam al-Mulk; Malik-Shah I

Strength
Unknown	Unknown

Casualties and losses
Heavy losses, including civilians, at least 50,000 prisoners	Unknown

In 1064, the Seljuk Sultan, Alp Arslan, besieged the fortified city of Ani. After a siege of 25 days, the Seljuks captured the city.

== Background ==
In 961, king Ashot III (953–77) transferred the capital from Kars to Ani. Ani expanded rapidly during the reign of King Smbat II economically and culturally. In the 10th century, the population was perhaps 50,000–100,000. Its renown was such that it was known as the "city of forty gates" and the "city of a thousand and one churches." Ani also became the site of the royal mausoleum of Bagratuni kings.

In 1045, the Byzantine emperor, Constantine IX Monomachos, organized a new expedition for the conquest of the city. assisted by the shaddadid ruler, Abu'l-Aswar Shavur ibn Fadl. The Armenian king, Gagik II, was invited by the emperor to Constantinople, declaring he would be made ruler of Ani and Shirak. Gagik accepted, and thus Ani fell to the Byzantines; however, it was a ruse. The Byzantines deposed Bagratuni dynasty and other local people and appointed mercenaries to rule the city.

During this time, the Seljuks began a military expedition to northeastern Anatolia under Ibrahim Inal and Tughril I.

== Prelude ==
The newly consolidated Seljuk sultan, Alp Arslan, aimed to increase the size of his borders in 1064, beginning with the wealthy neighboring regions of Armenia and Iberia. Setting out to mount a campaign, he gathered skilled Arab and Persian technicians to outfit his army with siege engines.

Ani served as the campaign's strategic goal. The Sultan proceeded in a circle, subduing the mountainous regions north of Ani before moving on to Georgia, where he defeated and vassalized King Bagrat IV. Before that, the Byzantine strongholds in the Araxes Valley and further west were taken by another division led by Vizier Nizam al-Mulk and Malik-Shah I.

== Siege ==
The city was commanded by two Byzantine generals, Duke Bagrat and Gregory. The city was said to be impossible to conquer. The city was located on a rocky peninsula overhanging a rapid river. A deep ravine to the west of the river protected the city. The Seljuks began setting up their tents, and the garrison cavalry initially thought they were merchants. However, they realized the truth, and they fled to the city.

According to Ibn al-Athir, the sultan, realizing he could not breach the walls, ordered the construction of battering rams, placed hay on top of them, and had the soldiers inside to attack.

Meanwhile, the Seljuks managed to destroy a portion of the walls due to undermining works with underground tunnels. The Seljuks entered the city on August 16 after a siege of 25 days. The defenders of the walls escaped and fortified themselves for a while in the citadel, but later escaped. The commanders of the city were captured.

An account of the sack and massacres in Ani is given by the Turkish historian Sibt ibn al-Jawzi, who quotes an eyewitness saying:

The army entered the city, massacred its inhabitants, pillaged and burned it, leaving it in ruins and taking prisoner all those who remained alive...The dead bodies were so many that they blocked the streets; one could not go anywhere without stepping over them. And the number of prisoners was not less than 50,000 souls. I was determined to enter the city and see the destruction with my own eyes. I tried to find a street in which I would not have to walk over the corpses; but that was impossible.

== Aftermath ==
The massive silver cross from the Ani Cathedral was taken down and set down on the Nakhichevan Mosque's doorstep so that worshippers could tread on it as they entered. Alp Arslan made his first Friday prayer in the cathedral, which changed its name to Fethiye Mosque. However, the city was quickly rebuilt. The Sultan had a portion of the prisoners rebuild the destroyed houses and walls and occupy them with new settlers.

The Abbasid caliph, Al-Qa'im, praised the Sultan for his victory and gave him the title "Abu'l-Feth." The Armenian king of Kars, Gagik, pledged allegiance to the Sultan; however, he left the city and gave his lands to the Byzantines.

== Sources ==
- Oktay Belli (2021), Ani in Every Aspect.
- Frederick William Bussell (1910), The Roman Empire, Essays on the Constitutional History from the Accession of Domitian (81 A. D.) to the Retirement of Nicephorus III (1081 A.D.).
