= Anna Rozen =

French writer

Anna Rozen is a French writer, best known for her short stories.

== Biography ==
Born at Algiers in 1960, she lived there for two years, but then grew up in France, first in Lorient and later, and for longer, in Toulouse; however she has spent the greatest part of her life in Paris. Before establishing herself as a writer, she worked as an editor, first for an advertising agency and later for television, and she continues to do some television work.

Rozen claims to have kept a personal diary ever since she was 15, but her first published work was a book of short stories, Plaisir d'offrir, joie de recevoir (The pleasure of giving, the joy of receiving), published in 1999 and recounting a young woman's sexual experiences. Since then, she has published novels, novellas, children's books and further collections of short stories. She has also worked as a translator, her French version of Andrew Kaufman's All my friends are superheroes appearing in 2007. As of 2007, her adult work has not been translated into English, but one of her children's books, Le marchand de bruits has been announced for publication in English as The merchant of noises in 2007.

== Selected works ==
- Plaisir d'offrir, joie de recevoir (1999), short stories
- Le Petit garçon qui n'existait pas (2000), for children
- Méfiez-vous des fruits (2002), novel
- Le Marchand de bruits (2002), for children (English translation, The merchant of noises, 2007)
- Chocolatine (2000), for children
- Utopie 230 (2004), novel
- Encore! (2005), novella
- Tous mes amis sont des super héros (2007), translation of the novella All my friends are superheroes, by Andrew Kaufman
- Vieilles peaux (2007), short stories
- La Bomb & Moi (2008)
