= Manastir, Plovdiv Province =

Manastir Манастир
- Village
- Location in Bulgaria
- Coordinates: 41.725264°N 24.855213°E
- Country: Bulgaria
- Province: Plovdiv Province
- Municipality: Laki Municipality

Area
  - Total: 68.834 km^{2} (26.577 sq mi)
- Elevation: 1,449 m (4,754 ft)

Population (2020)
  - Total: 69
- Time zone: UTC+2 (EET)
  - Summer (DST): UTC+3 (EEST)

Manastir (Bulgarian: Манастир) is a village located in Laki Municipality, in Plovdiv Province, central southern Bulgaria.

== Geography ==
Manastiris located in the Prespa section of the Rhodope Mountains, on the northern slopes of Mount Prespa. It is one of the highest inhabited villages in Bulgaria.
