= Gregory Pakourianos =

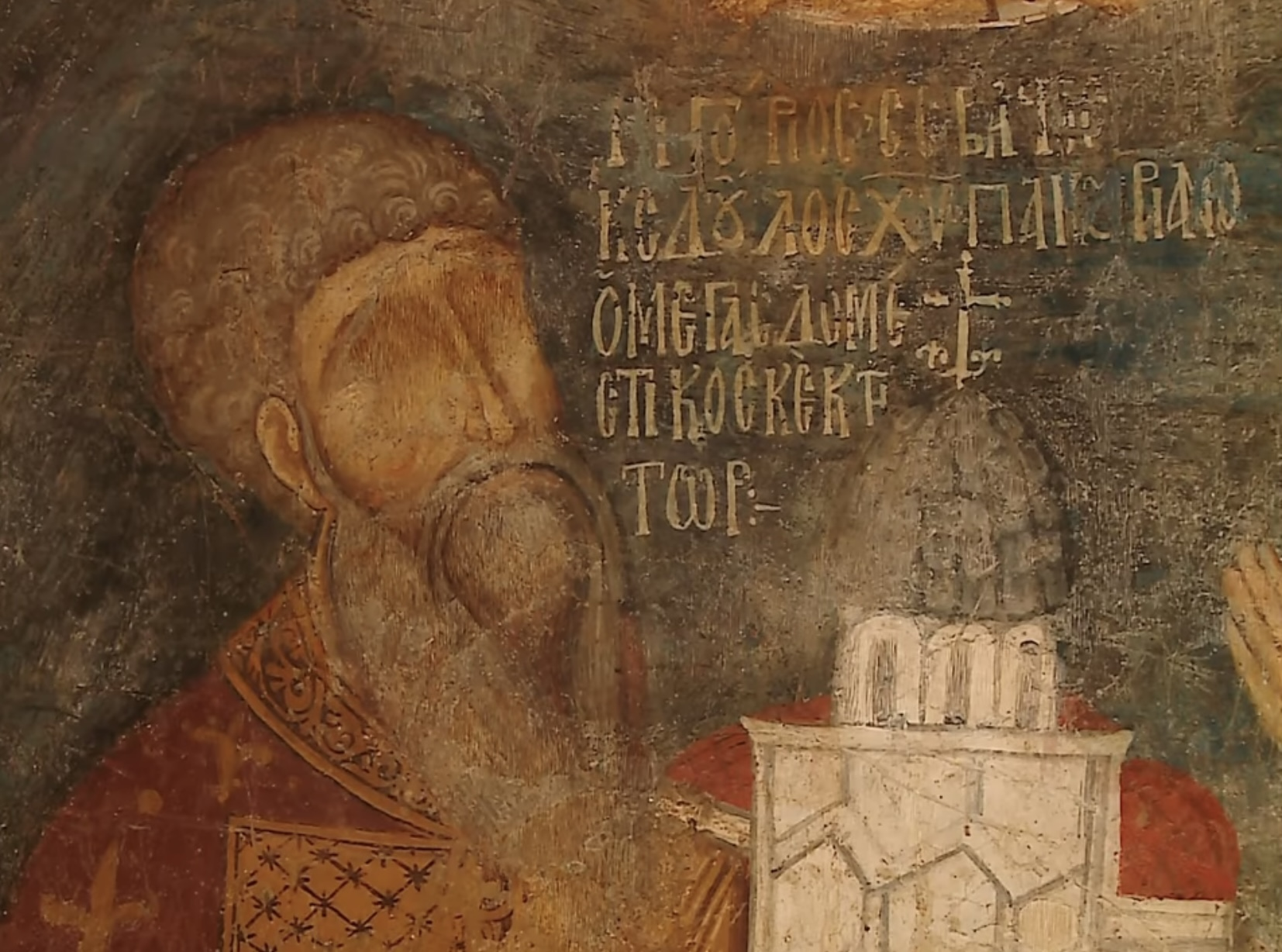
- Fresco of Gregory Pakourianos at Bachkovo.

Sebastos
- Grand Domestic of the West; 1081–1086
- Monarch: Alexios I Komnenos
- Preceded by: Alexios Komnenos
- Succeeded by: Adrianos Komnenos

Doux of Iberia
- In office c. 1071–c. 1074
- Monarch: Michael VII Doukas

Personal details
- Born: 1120s
- Died: 1086

Military service
- Allegiance: Byzantine Empire
- Years of service: c. 1060–1086
- Battles/wars: Byzantine-Seljuk wars; Siege of Ani (1064); Byzantine–Norman wars; Battle of Dyrrhachium (1081); Battle of Beliatoba

Gregory Pakourianos (Note: Georgian: გრიგოლ ბაკურიანის-ძე, Grigol Bakurianis-dze; Greek: Γρηγόριος Πακουριανός, Gregorios Pakourianos; Armenian: Գրիգոր Բակուրեան, Grigor Bakurean; Bulgarian: Григорий Бакуриани, Grigory Bakuriani) (1120s–1086) was a Byzantine politician and military commander of Georgian origin, the most famous member of the Pakourianos family. He was the founder of the Monastery of the Mother of God Petritzonitissa in Bachkovo and author of its typikon. The monks of this Orthodox monastery were Iberians.

== Early life ==
Gregory's father (or, according to another view, his grandfather), Pakourianos (Bakurian or Bakuran), was a member of the court of David III Kouropalates, a scion of the Georgian (Iberian) Bagratids who ruled over the border region of Tao (Armenian Tayk); the region was annexed by the Byzantines after David's death in 1000 or 1001. Upon taking possession of David's lands, the Byzantine emperor Basil II took with him Pakourianos and other leading Iberian nobles. Pakourianos received the title of patrician and was appointed strategos of Samos. V. A. Arutyunova-Fidanyan estimates that Gregory was born in the 1120s. In her view, Gregory's father was Aluz Pakourianos, mentioned in the history of Thomas Artsruni as the ruler (on behalf of the Byzantines) of three districts in Armenia, whereas the patrician Pakourianos/Bakurian was his grandfather. According to his own account, Gregory was left without an inheritance after the death of his father, since his mother used the family's wealth for her daughters' dowries. He travelled around Armenia, Iberia, and Syria before entering Byzantine service. In the Alexiad, Anna Komnene describes Gregory Pakourianos as having a tiny frame but being a mighty warrior.

== Service in the East ==
Gregory was sent to the empire's eastern frontier, where he served in the area of Kars and Theodosiopolis. In A. Hohlweg's view, he was the doux (governor) of Kars and Theodosiopolis. He participated in the unsuccessful defense of Ani against the Seljuk Turks in 1064. At this time Gregory held the honorary position of assistant or co-ruler of the governor of the theme of Iberia, the seat of which was in Ani. After the fall of Ani, he was appointed to a position in the Balkans. After the defeat of the Byzantines at the Battle of Manzikert in 1071, he was appointed Domestic or stratelates of the East and doux or katepano of the theme of Iberia, now based in Theodosiopolis. In the Georgian History of David the Builder, it is stated that the Georgian king George II (r. 1072–1089) engaged in negotiations with the "commander of the East" (Note: The term used is Georgian: ზორავარი აღმოსავლისა, romanized: zoravari aghmosavlisa; zoravari is a borrowing of Armenian zōravar 'general, commander', which corresponds to Greek strategos.) Gregory, son of Bakurian. In 1074, Gregory transferred all the lands under his authority (Theodosiopolis, Olti, Kars, Vanand, Karnipori, and a part of Tao) to George II. According to V. I. Silogava, Gregory ceded the territories after the Georgian victory over the Seljuks at the Battle of Partskhisi in 1073. D. A. Korobeinikov indicates that Pakourianos's withdrawal was a result of the threat created by the Norman adventurer Roussel de Bailleul. Georgian troops slowed the Turkish advance for some time, and a full-scale invasion of Georgia occurred only in 1080. The Georgian king was eventually forced to accept Seljuk suzerainty.

== Service in the West and death ==
By the mid-1070s, the Seljuk Turks had reached the Asian side of the Bosporus, and in 1074 the Byzantines concluded a peace with the Seljuks leaving them the lands they had conquered in Asia Minor. After this, Gregory was again appointed to positions in the Balkans. Already under Emperor Michael VII (r. 1071–1078) he held extensive estates. Some of these (those around Ani and in the Armeniac Theme) were lost as a result of the Seljuk conquests, but he received others in the vicinity of Mosynopolis and Philippopolis. Nikephoros III (r. 1078–1081) granted him further holdings. Later Gregory was involved in the coup that removed Nikephoros III and placed Alexios I Komnenos on the throne. The new emperor appointed him "megas domestikos [grand domestic] of All the West", with his residence at Adrianople. Alexios I gave him many more properties in the Balkans and also bestowed upon him the title of sebastos. Gregory was afforded a variety of privileges by the emperor, including exemption from certain taxes. In 1081, he commanded the left flank against the Normans at the Battle of Dyrrachium. Gregory fought effectively against the Normans in other engagements, reforming Byzantine units after defeats and destroying individual Norman garrisons, such as the one at Moglena. He also engaged in diplomacy and managed to buy off some of the vassals of Bohemond of Taranto. At some point between 1081 and 1083, he won a battle against the Pechenegs. He also spent some time as a prisoner of the Cumans. He died in 1086 fighting the Pechenegs at the battle of Beliatoba; according to Anna Komnene, Gregory "fought desperately and made fierce onsets on the foe, but was dashed against an oak and killed on the spot." Anna further adds that Emperor Alexios was "most grieved at the Domestic's death and shed floods of tears, for he loved him exceedingly even before his elevation to the throne."

== Patronage and writings ==
Gregory was also a patron and promoter of Christian culture. He together with his brother Abas (Apasios) made, in 1074, a significant donation to the Georgian monastery of Iveron on Mount Athos. He founded the Georgian monastery Petritzonitissa in Bachkovo (now in Bulgaria) and wrote its typikon. The typikon was written in Greek, Georgian, and Armenian; only the Greek and Georgian versions are extant. He signed the Greek version of the typikon in Armenian. According to Silogava, Gregory's typikon is important not only as a historical and liturgical source but also as a work of 11th-century Georgian literature: "The author's profound philosophical and lyrical digressions attest to his well-developed literary talent." A Greek homily on Saint Pancras of Taormina has also been attributed to Gregory. Gregory Pakourianos and his brother Abas were buried in a church built near the Bachkovo Monastery to hold their remains. One of the frescoes in that church depicts the two brothers.

== Ethnocultural identity ==
Gregory's origins are a matter for scholarly dispute, mainly between Armenian and Georgian scholars. In the Alexiad, Anna Komnene writes that Gregory was "descended from a noble Armenian family." The Alexiad is the only primary source which refers to Gregory as Armenian by origin; Nikoloz Aleksidze notes that Anna was only three years old when Gregory died. The 12th-century Armenian chronicler Matthew of Edessa states that Gregory was a Georgian (specifically, "Georgian by nation/race"—vratsi azgaw). In the preface to the typikon for the monastery he founded (which he signed in "Armenian characters"), Gregory himself proclaimed that he belonged to "the glorious people of the Iberians" and claimed to belong to a "brilliant Georgian family". He also insisted that his monks know the Georgian language. According to some scholars, Matthew of Edessa's reference to Gregory as "Georgian by nation", as well as Gregory's own self-identification as a Georgian in the typikon, refer not to his ethnicity but to his confessional identity as a follower of the Georgian Orthodox Church. Other scholars maintain that he was of Georgian origin. Giorgi Tcheishvili writes:

[Gregory] regarded the Byzantine empire as his homeland and acted as a faithful soldier of the emperor throughout his career; yet, at the same time the typikon of his monastery reveals his concerns about his Georgian compatriots and the land of his fathers, Georgia. […] Under Byzantine suzerainty, the population of Upper Tao identified itself as 'Georgian'. Under Byzantine suzerainty, the population of Upper Tao identified itself as 'Georgian'. The elite of Tao (Basil Bagratisdze, P'eris Jojikisdze, Abas and Grigol Bakurianisdze [i.e. Gregory Pakourianos]) regarded Georgia as 'our country' and strove for its spiritual, cultural and political prosperity.

The scholar Nina G. Garsoïan states, "The most likely explanation is that [the Pakourian family] belonged to the mixed Armeno-Iberian Chalcedonian aristocracy, which dwelt in the border district of Tayk῾/Tao." Alexander Kazhdan states that the difference between Georgians and Armenians of the Chalcedonian confession was "not unbridgeable, especially in the region of Taiq," and notes that some Byzantine subjects spoke and wrote both Georgian and Armenian, in addition to Greek. According to the scholars V. P. Stepanenko and V. S. Shandrovskaya, evidence from the seals left behind by other members of the Pakourianos family indicates that their ethnocultural identity was "far more complex than proponents of a strictly Georgian or Armenian origin had assumed." The names recorded on these seals, along with the family's apparent claims of descent from the Arsacids, indicate that they had not yet forgotten their Armenian background, although they had become culturally Georgian "at least one or two generations before Gregory". Though Gregory himself was Eastern Orthodox, some of his relatives were Armenian Apostolic, for which reason he sought a chrysobull permitting him to transfer property to them.
