= Laki, Plovdiv Province =

City in Laki municipality, Plovdiv oblast, Bulgaria

Coordinates: 41°50′N 24°50′E

Laki (Bulgarian: Лъки [ˈɫɤki]) is a small town in Laki Municipality in Plovdiv Province, southern Bulgaria. As of 2006 it had 2,615 inhabitants. It is located in the Rhodope Mountains, 54 km to the south of the province capital Plovdiv, and 88 km to the north of Smolyan. There is a lead-zinc flotation factory, several textile plants, and timber workshops.
