= Chepelare (river) =

Chepelarska reka
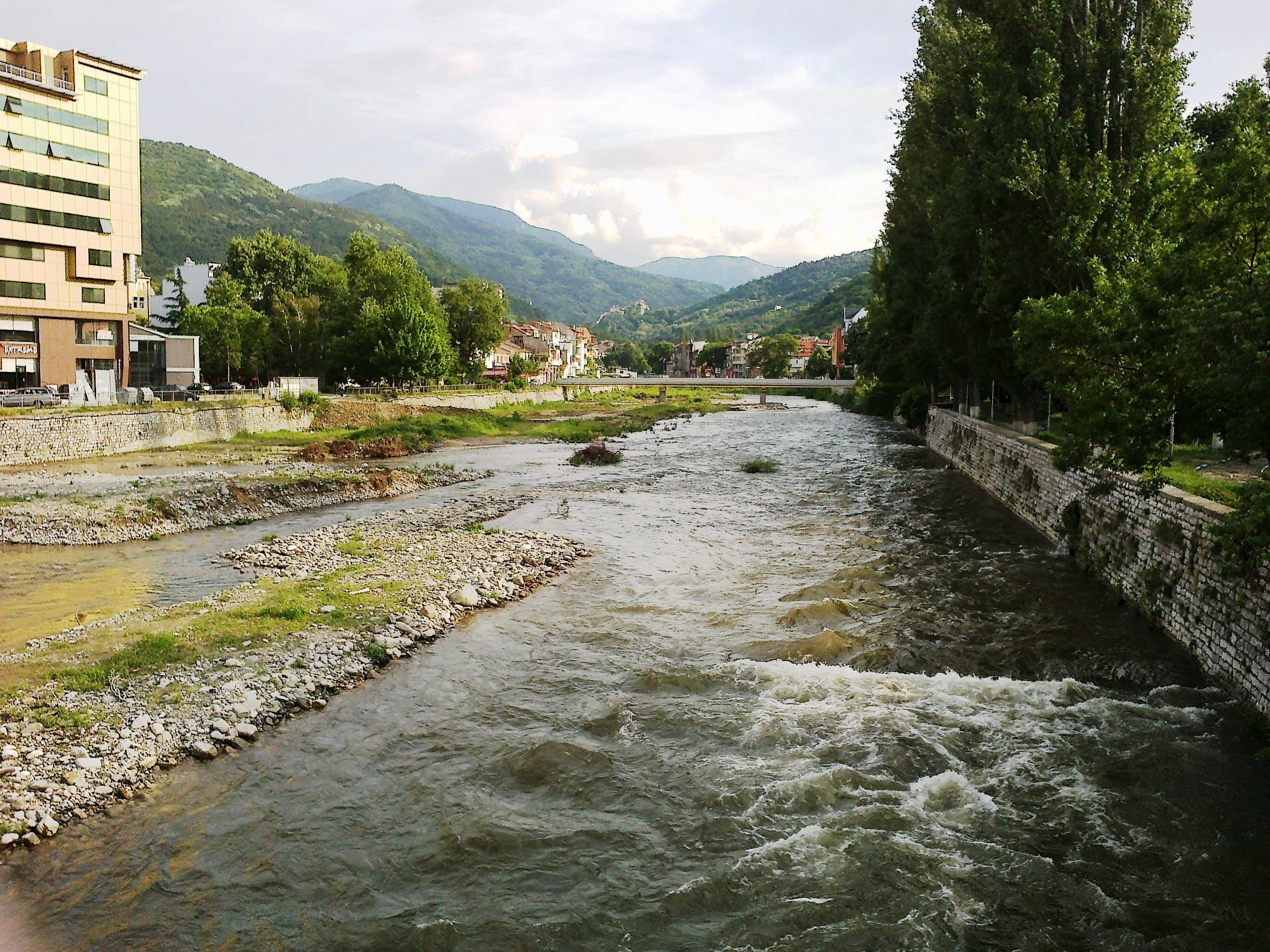
- The river in Asenovgrad

Location
- Country: Bulgaria

Physical characteristics
- Source
  - location: Pamporovo, Rhodope Mountains
  - coordinates: 41°39′6.12″N 24°41′47.04″E
  - elevation: 1,550 m (5,090 ft)
- Mouth
  - location: Maritsa
  - coordinates: 42°9′24.12″N 24°53′53.16″E
  - elevation: 148 m (486 ft)
- Length: 86 km (53 mi)
- Basin size: 1,010 km^{2} (390 sq mi)

Basin features
- Progression: Maritsa→ Aegean Sea

The Chepelare river or Chepelarska reka (Bulgarian: Чепеларска река) is an 86 km-long river in the Rhodope Mountains of southern Bulgaria, a right tributary of the river Maritsa.

== Name ==
Until 1943 the river was known as the Chaya (Чая), which probably originates from the Bulgarian word for tea, чай, due to the abundance of herbal tea plants along its course (species such as Mentha, Tilia, Thymus, etc.) especially along its middle course, where it is still locally called the Chaya. Between 1942 and 1989 it was officially named the Chepelarska reka after the town of Chepelare, situated in its upper course. Since 1989 the official name is the Asenitsa (Асеница) after the city of Asenovgrad in its lower course. However, many institutes including map makers and the National Institute of Meteorology and Hydrology at the Bulgarian Academy of Sciences still use the name Chepelarska reka.

== Geography ==
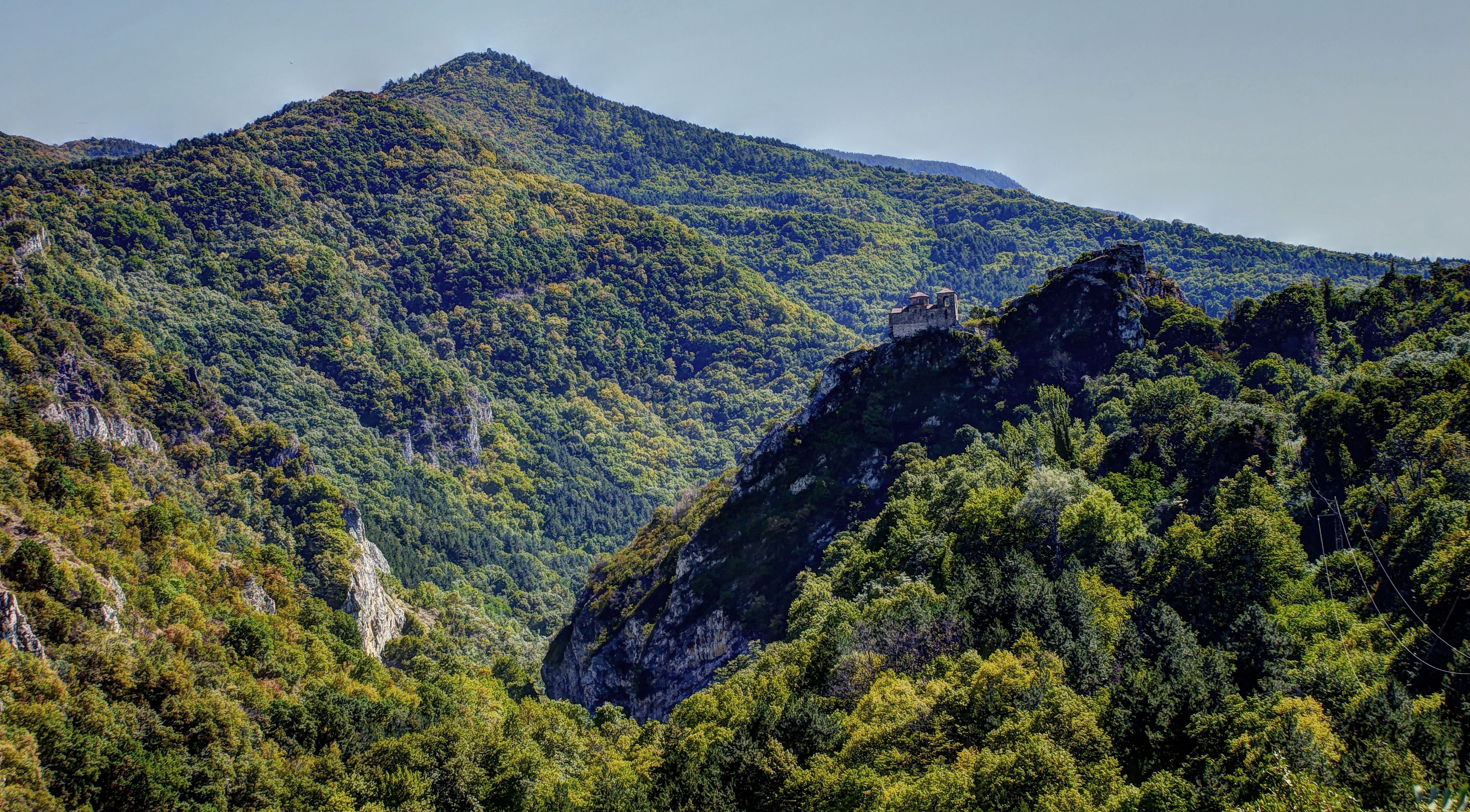
Asen's Fortress rising over the Chepelarska reka valley

The river takes its source at an altitude of 1,550 m in the Pamporovo ski resort in the western Rhodope mountain range. Until the village of Hvoyna the Chepelarska reka flows north, then turns in northeastern direction until the village of Bachkovo, where it again turns north until its mouth. Throughout most of its course until the outskirts of Asenovgrad, the river flows in a deep and dramatic valley with two widenings at Chepelare and Hvoyna. Downstream it enters the Upper Thracian Plain, where the riverbed becomes wide and sandy, with irrigations canals diverting from it. The Chepelarska reka flows into the Maritsa at an altitude of 183 m some 2.5 km south of the village of Rogosh. The river receives numerous tributaries, the most important being the Yugovska reka (45 km).

Its drainage basin covers a territory of 1010 km^{2} or 1.9% of Maritsa's total and borders the drainage basins of the Cherkezitsa to the east, the Arda to the southeast, the Vacha to the southwest and west, and the Parvenetska reka to the northwest, all of them right tributaries of the Maritsa.

The Chepelarska reka has predominantly rain-snow feed with high water in April–May and low water in August. The average annual flow at Bachkovo is 12 m^{3}/s.

== Settlements and economy ==
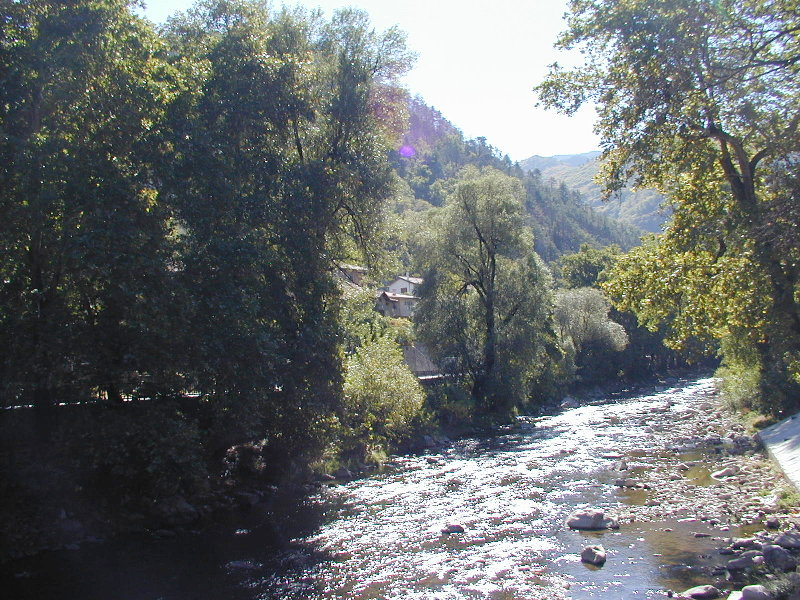
Chepelarska reka at Bachkovo

The upper course is in Smolyan Province and most of its length is in Plovdiv Province. There are six settlements along its course — the towns of Chepelare and the village of Hvoyna in Smolyan Province, and the city of Asenovgrad and the villages of Narechenski Bani, Bachkovo and Katunitsa in Plovdiv Province. Most of its valley is followed by a 59.3 km section of the second class II-86 road Plovdiv–Smolyan–Rudozem, between Asenovgrad and Progled. The river's waters are utilised for small-scale electricity generation with three small hydro power plants — Chepelare, Asenitsa I and Asenitsa II. In the Upper Thracian Plain its waters are diverted for irrigation and industrial water supply.

== Landmarks and tourism ==
There are numerous landmarks along the river. In and around Asenovgrad along its lower course are five monasteries, nine churches and 42 chapels. Over the exit of the river valley from the Rhodope Mountains are perched the ruins of the medieval Bulgarian Asen's Fortress and its well-preserved Church of the Holy Mother of God, included in the 100 Tourist Sites of Bulgaria of the Bulgarian Tourist Union. A few kilometers upstream from the fortress is Bachkovo Monastery, one of the largest and most important spiritual sites in the country. The right banks of the river form the western boundary of Chervenata Stena, one of the most important nature reserves in the Rhodope Mountains, which protects numerous rare and endemic species among dramatic scenery. It is part of the UNESCO World Network of Biosphere Reserves. Narechenski Bani on its middle course is a spa resort with hotels and sanatoria. The Chepelarska reka springs on the territory of Pamporovo, which is among the three top ski resorts in Bulgaria and the largest one in the Rhodope Mountains.
