= Bachkovo Monastery =

Eastern Orthodox monastery in Plovdiv Province, Bulgaria

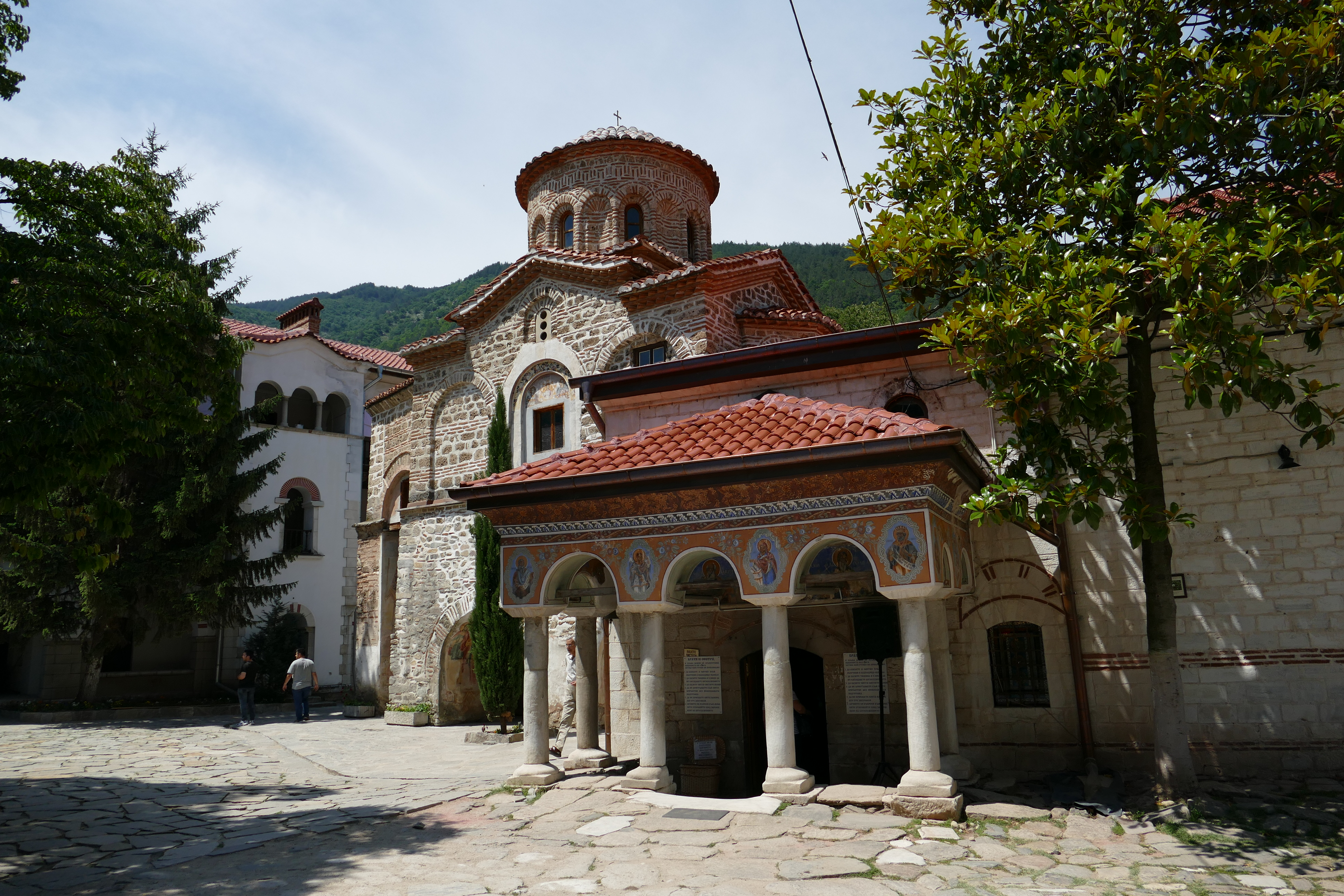
- Church of the Dormition, Bachkovo Monastery

- Location within Bulgaria
- Interactive map of Bachkovo Monastery

Monastery information
- Other names: Petritsoni Monastery; Monastery of the Mother of God Petritzonitissa
- Established: 1083

People
- Founder: Gregory Pakourianos

Site
- Location: Bachkovo, Asenovgrad Municipality, Plovdiv Province
- Coordinates: 41°56′32″N 24°50′58″E
- Public access: yes

The Bachkovo Monastery of the Dormition of the Theotokos (Bulgarian: Бачковски манастир "Успение Богородично", Bachkovski manastir, Georgian: პეტრიწონის მონასტერი, romanized: p'et'rits'onis monast'eri), archaically the Petritsoni Monastery or Monastery of the Mother of God Petritzonitissa is a major Eastern Orthodox monastery in Southern Bulgaria. It is located on the right bank of the Chepelare River, 189 km from Sofia and 10 km south of Asenovgrad, and is directly subordinate to the Holy Synod of the Bulgarian Orthodox Church.

Founded as a Georgian Orthodox monastic center, Bachkovo is known and appreciated for the unique combination of Georgian, Byzantine, and Bulgarian culture, united by the common faith.

== History ==
The monastery was founded in 1083 by Prince Gregory Pakourianos, a prominent Georgian statesman and military commander in the Byzantine service. Alongside the Iviron Monastery, Bachkovo was one of several Georgian monastic centers abroad, where Georgian monks produced original theological works, as well as translations of foreign religious texts, and sent them back to Georgia. Pakourianos required that his monks know the Georgian language. Among the monks on site was Ioane Petritsi, whose work would play a significant role in developing Georgian philosophy.

At the founding of Bachkovo, there was rivalry between the Byzantine Empire and the ascendant Kingdom of Georgia, with many Georgians suspecting that Greeks were trying to supplant them. According to Gregory Pakourianos's typikon for Bačkovo, which was written in 1083, "the Greeks are oppressors, covetous, scheming and unreliable. They used to take advantage of the Georgians' innocence and open-heartedness and strive to seize our monasteries." As a result of these tensions, Greeks were generally prohibited from being included in the monastery. Similar dynamics were present in other contemporary Georgian monasteries in the Balkans, such as the Monastery of Iviron in Greece, where the Greeks did eventually manage to take over.

At the monastery, Paskourianos also set up a seminary(school) for the youth. The curriculum included religion, as well as mathematics, history and music. In the 13th century, the Georgian monks of the Petritsioni (Bachkovo) Monastery lost their domination over the monastery, but their traditions were preserved until the beginning of 14th century.

During the time of the Second Bulgarian Empire, Bachkovo Monastery was patronized by Tsar Ivan Alexander, which is evidenced by an image of him on the arches of the ossuary's narthex. It is believed that the founder of Tarnovo Literary School and last patriarch of the mediaeval Bulgarian Orthodox Church, Patriarch Euthymius, was exiled by the Turks and worked in the school of the monastery in the early 15th century.

Although the monastery survived the first waves of Turkish invasion in Bulgarian lands, it was then looted and destroyed, but restored near the end of the 15th century. The refectory, whose mural paintings by an anonymous painter bear a significant artistic value, was reconstructed in 1601 and the Church of Mary, still preserved today, was finished in 1604.

Bachkovo Monastery is the final resting place of both Patriarch Euthymius (1330–1404) and Patriarch Cyril (1953–1971).

== Complex ==
=== Ossuary ===
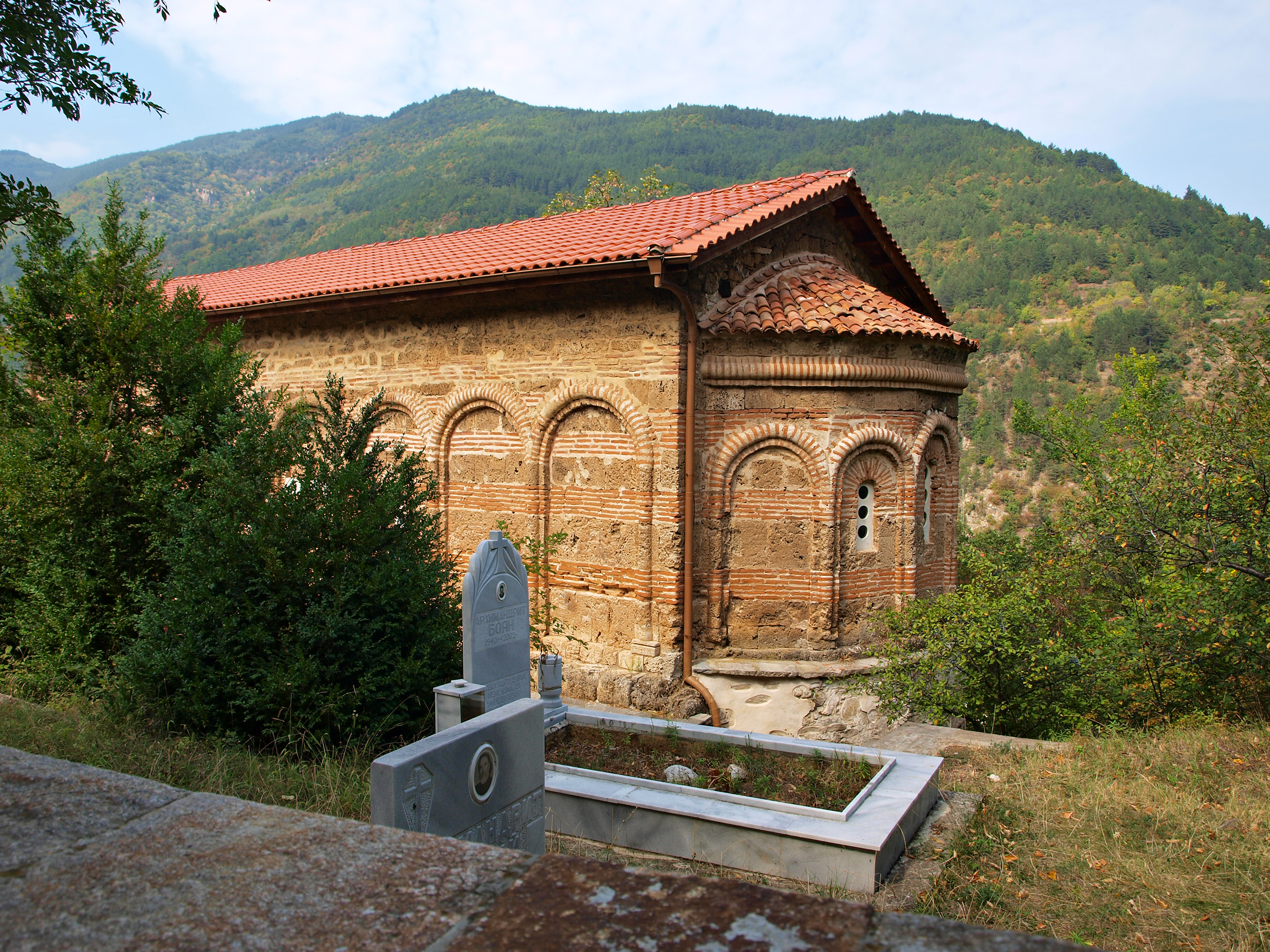
The medieval ossuary

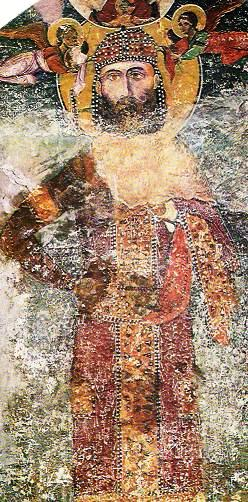
A 14th-century donor portrait in fresco of Bulgarian tsar Ivan Alexander in the ossuary

The only part that has survived from the monastery's original structure is the ossuary, which has a specific architectural design and ancient frescoes, and is situated 300 m away from the contemporary monastery complex. It looks inaccessible when viewed from the north. The building has two storeys, of which only one can be seen from the south. From architectural point of view the plan of the ossuary looks foreign to the local traditions. It is reminiscent of Syrian-Palestine mortuaries with its two floors of identical design. Each floor has a narthex, a single nave and an apse. The ground floor is intended for a crypt and has 14 burial niches. It would appear that the original ossuary was designed to house fourteen specific corpses under the floor pavement. This style of ossuary is not found anywhere else in the world. The apse on the upper floor, the church proper (known as The Holy Trinity Church), is semicircular on the inside and pentagonal on the outside with 3 openings to let some daylight into the altarplace. The building is vaulted. The ossuary is interesting with the methods of its construction. It represents a mixture of Georgian and Byzantine building traditions. The facade is attractively diversified with 8 blind niches and a succession of layers of brick and stone, joined with mortar. The ante chamber is separated from the church by thick walls and solid wooden doors, painted with the Georgian Cross depicting the strong influence of the Georgians in the construction and running of this monastery in the 11th and 12th Century. Above the doorway arch is the mural of the Madonna and child.

=== Cathedral ===
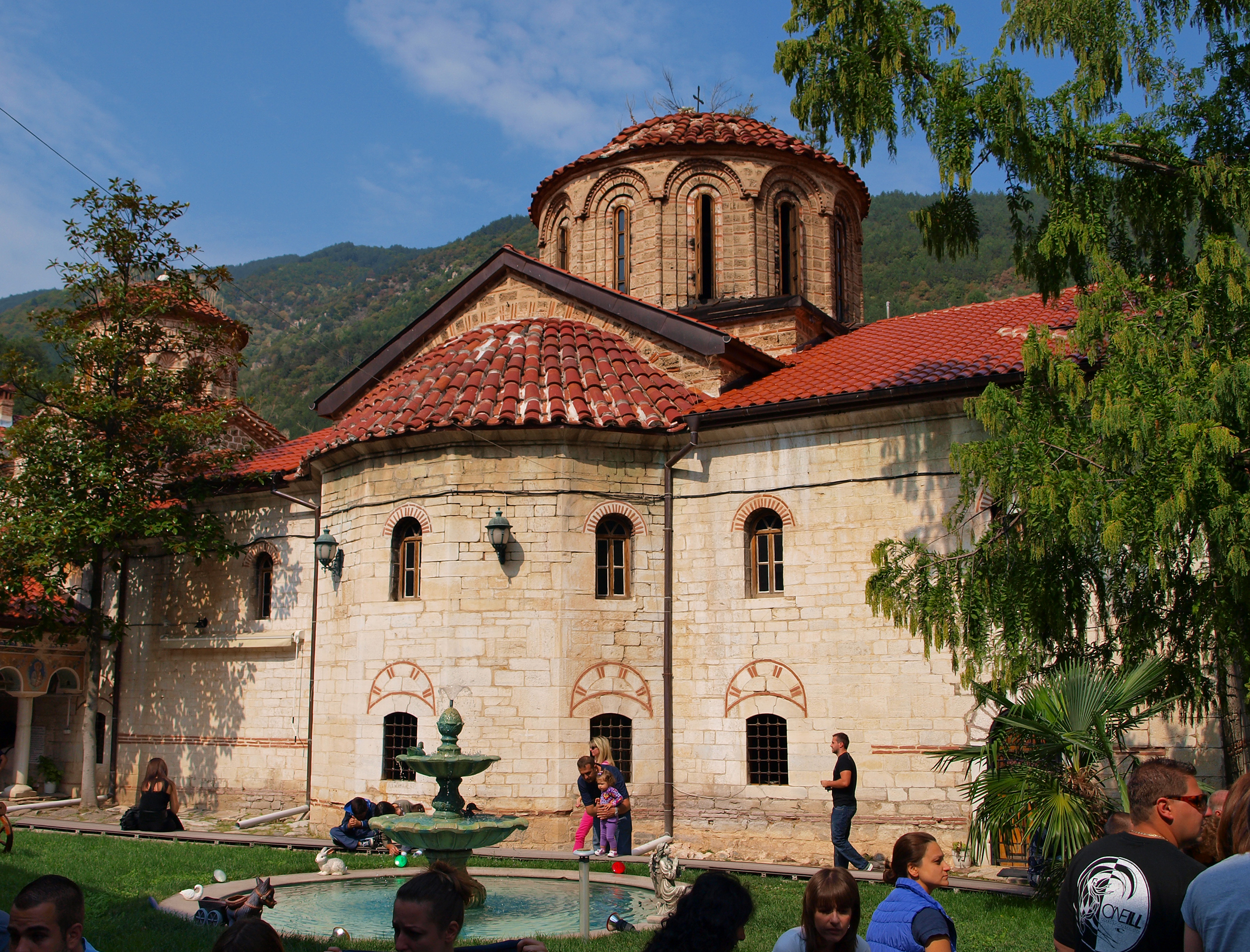
The Cathedral Church of the Virgin Mary

The Cathedral Church of the Virgin Mary (dating from 1604) is the place where a valuable icon of the Virgin Mary Eleusa from 1310 is kept (brought from Georgia). According to the legend, the icon is wonder-working, attracting many pilgrims. This church was built in the place of the monastery's oldest church destroyed by the Turks. The building has survived to this day in its original structure of a three- aisled, cruciform domed basilica with three pentagonal apses. A silver- gilded cross rising from the dome bears the inscription "Always win!" in Georgian. The murals in the spacious narthex were painted in 1643 and depict a life-size portraits of Georgi and his son Constantine, who were high-ranking notables in Istanbul and donors to the church. The frescoes in the nave were painted much later, in 1850, by Joan Mosch (master Mosko). The two central icons in the iconostasis are exactly dated – 1793. these the icons of The Holy Virgin and Jesus Christ. The woodwork — iconostasis, bishop's throne and the like, dates from the 18th century.

=== Church of the Archangels ===
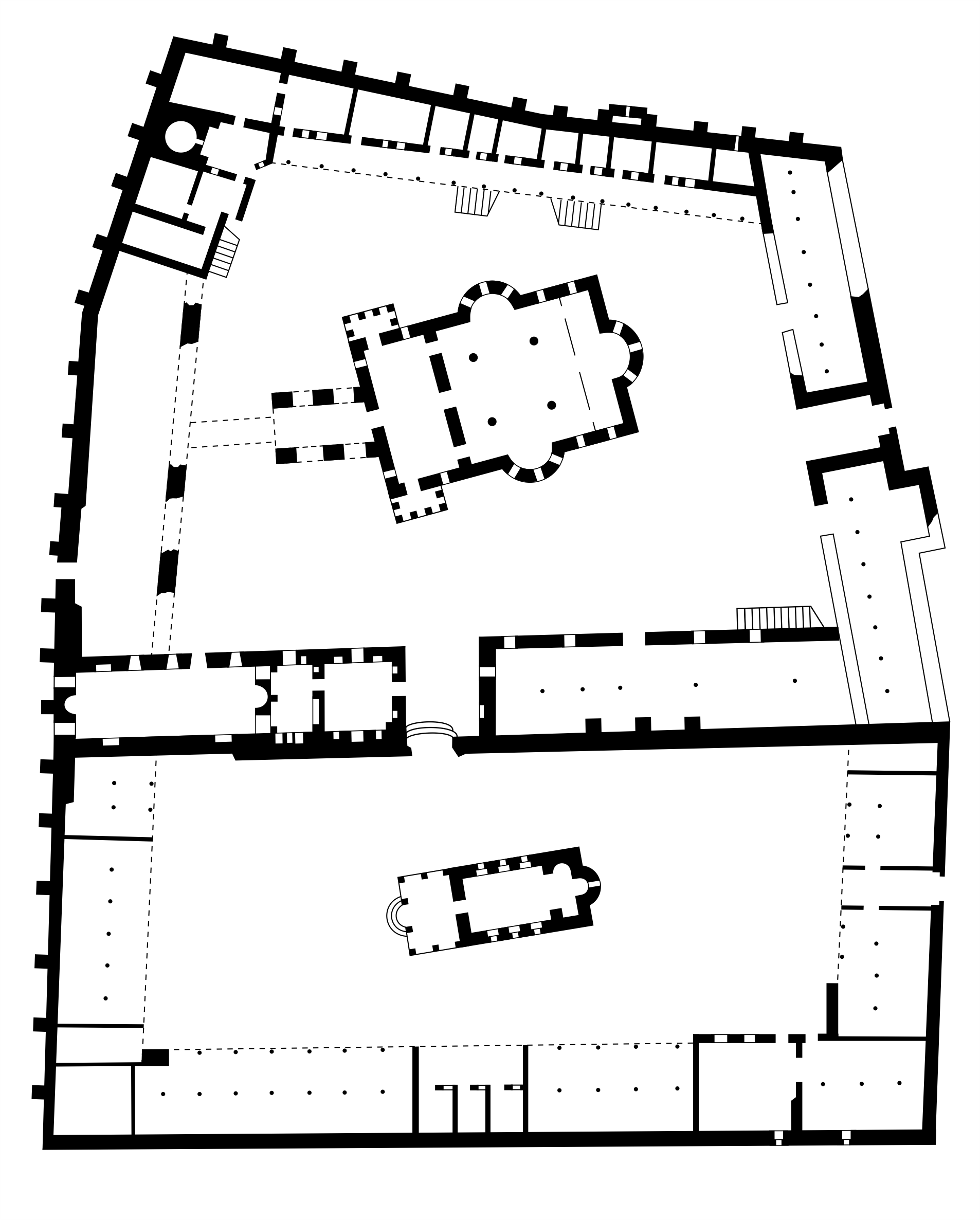
Bachkovo Monastery plan

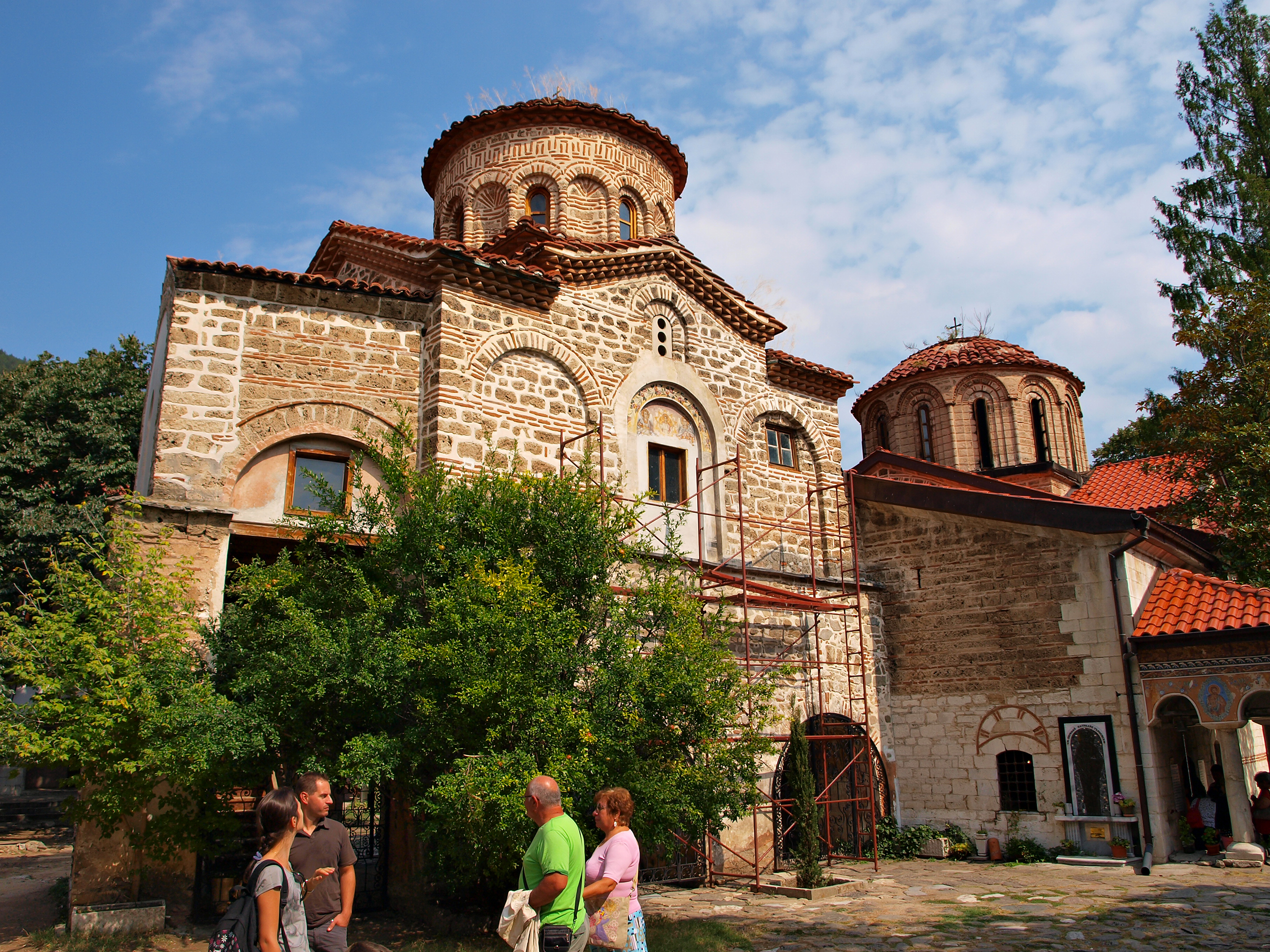
The Church of the Archangels

Another medieval church of the monastery is the Archangels' Church dating back probably to the 12th century, the vaulted open narthex of which was painted by Zahari Zograf in 1841. The inside of the church was painted by the artist Joan Mosch in 1846.

=== Jujube tree ===
The broad branches of a jujube, brought from Georgia more than two centuries ago, stretch over the courtyard. A famous jujube brandy (djindjifilova rakia) is distilled in the monastery.

=== Works of art ===
The museum of the monastery has a rich exhibition of church plate, icons, books, the sword of Friedrich Barbarossa, a sultan's firman from 1452, a wood-carved cross with miniatures. A fresco of the Doomsday, painted by Zahari Zograf in 1850, is retained in the Saint Nicholas Church and is thought of as one of the most interesting works of art of the Bulgarian National Revival.

==== The “Panorama” mural ====
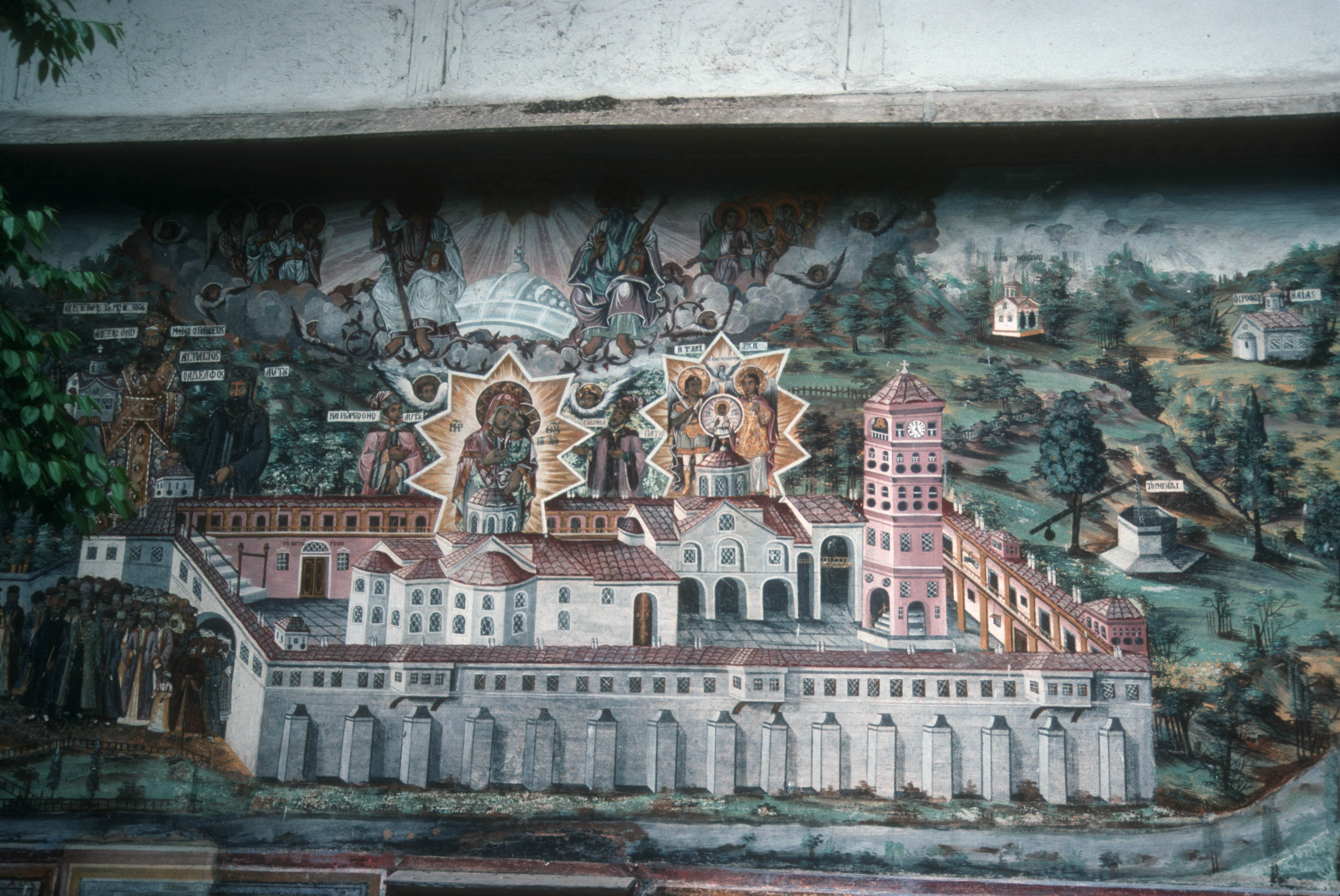
The "Panorama" mural

The “Panorama” mural, which runs along the outside wall of the refectory, represents the history of Bachkovo monastery pictorially. It provides a bird's eye view of the monastery with all the surrounding buildings at the time of the painting.

Under the influence of different atmospheric conditions like rain, snow, fog, cold, wind, the biggest scenic mural on the Balkan peninsula has preserved the freshness of its paint. The painter Alexi Atanasov, a Bulgarian from the town of Negush, worked in this region in the 19th century.

The year of the decoration can be determined by an inscription that was on the outside walls of the western monastery wing, which was burned in 1902. This inscription read:

“The following depiction was finished under the ministry of Abbot Cyril on 22 July 1846. The depiction has been made by my own hand, Alexi Atanasov from Negush.”

As a model, the painter used a copper print that was made in Vienna with the financial help of the merchant from Samokov, Petar Rana, in 1807. Alexi Atanasov added valuable details and pictorial elements of his own. The “Panorama” mural gives us rich information about the architectural ensemble of the monastery in the 19th century. The northern facades of the churches St Archangels Michael and Gabriel and The Holy Virgin, were painted, too. The monastic buildings with their big buttresses on the river side can be seen. Central place was given to the founders of the monastery, who were depicted in monastic attire. The Emperor Alexius Comnenus is among them. At their side are the donors from the 14th century: George and Gabriel. The surroundings of the monastery are shown: the nunnery in Asenovgrad; Assen's fortress; the chapels nearby. The painter gave us a good idea from ethnographical point of view, about the clothing of the aristocracy from Plovdiv and the festal clothing of the women in the Rhodopes, through the group of the people that are following the Procession of the Miraculous Icon. Details, such as the well in the northern courtyard and the belfry in the Church of the Archangels, are included. Scenes from the passionals of the two Saints George and Demetrius are depicted at the side of the “Panorama”.

The “Panorama” mural is exceptionally interesting because of its sheer size and because of its artistic impact and craftsmanship. The paints were made after a recipe by the painter himself, probably from grasses mixed with egg emulsion. The used painting technique is “fresco buono,” which is a mural art of painting that is applied on a smooth moist plaster. When the water evaporates the images emerge on the surface. The implication of this technique, with the great deal of artistic mastery, is why these murals look fresh today.

== Cultural associations ==
- Bachkovo Monastery is one of the locations in the 2005 bestseller novel The Historian by Elizabeth Kostova.
