= Rudozem =

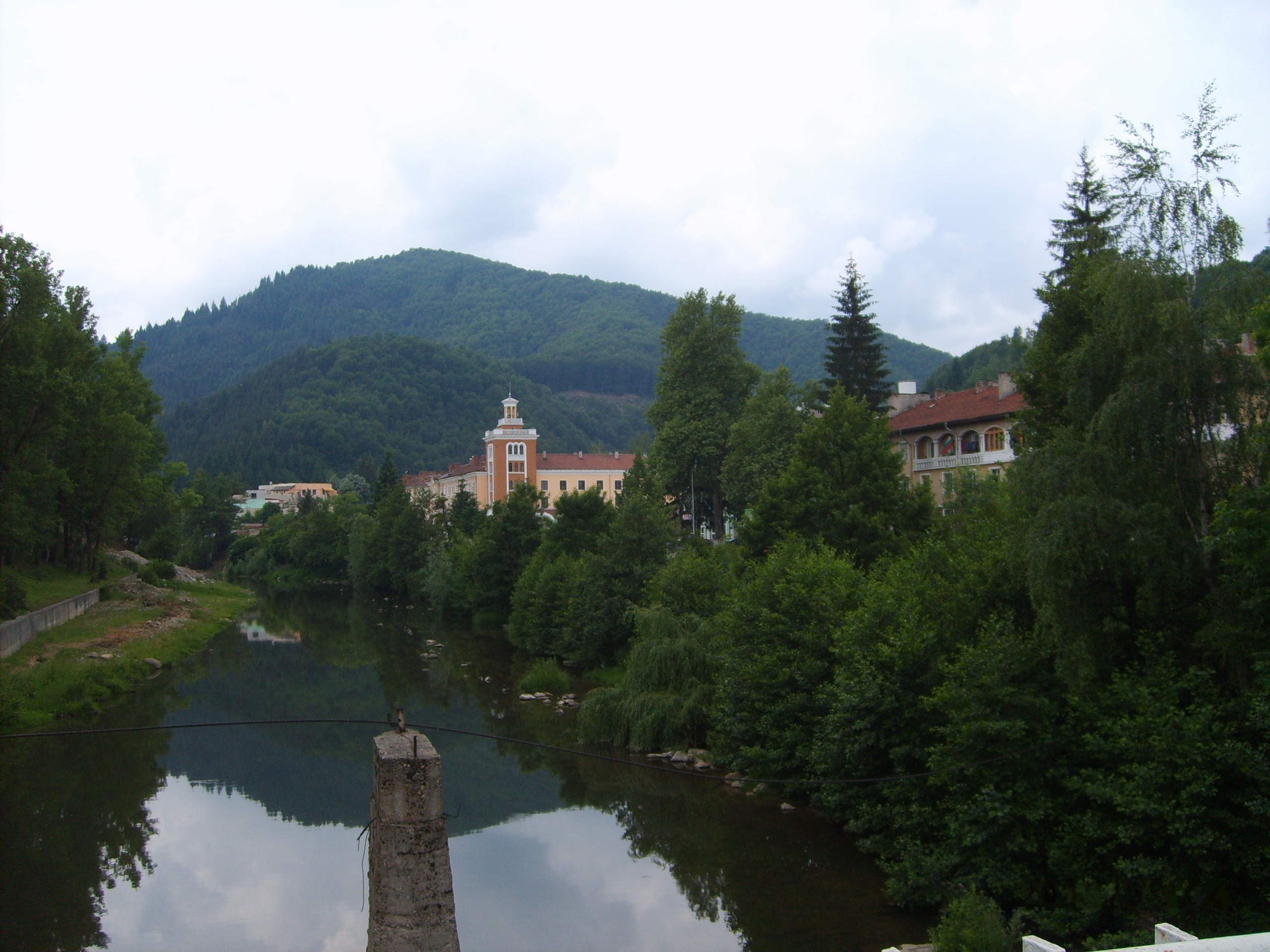
- Chepinska river in the city centre.

- Location of Rudozem
- Coordinates: 41°29′N 24°51′E
- Country: Bulgaria
- Provinces (Oblast): Smolyan

Government
  - Mayor: Rumen Pehlivanov (MRF)
- Elevation: 826 m (2,710 ft)

Population (31.12.2009)
  - Total: 3,583
- Time zone: UTC+2 (EET)
  - Summer (DST): UTC+3 (EEST)
- Postal Code: 4960
- Area code: 0306

Rudozem (Bulgarian: Рудозем [rudoˈzɛm]) is a town in southern Bulgaria, near the Greek border, located in the Rhodope Mountains, where the Elhovo and Chepino rivers flow into the Arda, and is part of Smolyan Province. It is the administrative centre of the homonymous Rudozem Municipality. As of December 2009, the town had a population of 3,583.

The name Rudozem is a compound word made up of Bulgarian ruda (руда) meaning "ore"; and the root zem (зем) meaning "land". It refers to the wealth of the area in mineral resources. Its former name is Palas. During the rule of the Ottoman Empire, it was part of the Ottoman İskeçe sanjak in Edirne vilayet between 1867 and 1912.

Rudozem Heights on Fallières Coast in Antarctica is named after the town.

Since 1 January 2025, Rudozem is linked to Xanthi in Greece via the Aegean Pass and the Rudozem-Xanthi border crossing.
